= Noel Willman =

Irish actor and theatre director (1918–1988)

- Willman in The Reptile (1966)
- Born: 4 August 1918; Derry, Ireland
- Died: 24 December 1988 (aged 70); New York City, New York, U.S.
- Occupations: Actor, theatre director
- Years active: 1953–1976

Noel Bath Willman (4 August 1918 – 24 December 1988) was an Irish actor and theatre director, who worked principally in Great Britain and later in the United States. He won a Tony Award for Best Direction of a Play for his work on Robert Bolt's A Man for All Seasons on Broadway, with a second nomination for The Lion in Winter.

== Early life and education ==
Willman was born in Derry in 1918, to a French father, Romain Willman, and an English mother, Charlotte Ellis. He was raised in Ireland and in France, and studied for the stage at the London Theatre Studio, which had been set up by Michel Saint-Denis and George Devine in 1936.

== Career ==
=== Theatre ===
He made his professional stage debut with a walk-on role in Hamlet, directed by John Gielgud, at the Lyceum Theatre in 1939.

Working as stage manager for Gielgud's touring production of The Beggar's Opera, he took over the role of Macheath at short notice from Michael Redgrave, who had fallen ill and whose usual understudy had suffered a bout of laryngitis.

During World War II, Willman toured with the The Old Vic Company, then directed by Tyrone Guthrie, playing in The Merchant of Venice in 1941, and taking part in several productions at the Vic's Liverpool Playhouse base, including Shaw's Androcles and the Lion. Prompted by Guthrie, he became a director. In 1942, he presented his debut production Ah, Wilderness! by Eugene O'Neill.

Willman won a Tony Award in 1962 for his direction of the original Broadway production of Robert Bolt's A Man For All Seasons. According to Bolt, he was instrumental in many aspects of the play's development, including the casting of Paul Scofield as Thomas More. In 1966 he was nominated in the same category for James Goldman's The Lion in Winter. He later directed Katharine Hepburn and Christopher Reeve in A Matter of Gravity in 1976.

He frequently collaborated with Bolt, directing The Tiger and the Horse and Gentle Jack (and appearing in Zhivago, which Bolt scripted). One of his most famous theatrical roles was opposite Alec Guinness in the stage production of Bridget Boland's The Prisoner, for which he won the Clarence Derwent Award, and which was later made into a film, starring Guinness and Jack Hawkins.

=== Film and television ===
Willman's films included The Man Who Knew Too Much (1956), Across the Bridge (1957), Carve Her Name with Pride (1958), Kiss of the Vampire (1963), Doctor Zhivago (1965), The Reptile (1966), and The Odessa File (1974).

== Personal life ==
Willman was a conscientious objector during the Second World War, and spent it as a beekeeper on a government-run farm outside London.

=== Death ===
Willman died aged 70 in New York City, of a heart attack.

== Filmography ==
Year	Title	Role	Notes
1952	The Pickwick Papers	Mr. Perker	
1952	Androcles and the Lion	Spintho	
1953	The Net	Dr. Dennis Bord	
1953	Malta Story	Hobley, Navy Pilot	Uncredited
1954	Beau Brummell	Lord Byron	
1955	The Dark Avenger	Du Guesclin	
1956	The Man Who Knew Too Much	Woburn	
1957	Seven Waves Away	Aubrey Clark	
1957	Across the Bridge	Chief of Police	
1958	Carve Her Name with Pride	Interrogator	
1960	Cone of Silence	Nigel Pickering	
1960	Never Let Go	Inspector Thomas	
1960	The Criminal	Prison Governor	
1961	Two Living, One Dead	Johnson	
1961	The Girl on the Boat	Webster	
1963	Kiss of the Vampire	Dr. Ravna	
1965	Doctor Zhivago	Razin	
1966	The Reptile	Dr. Franklyn	
1968	The Vengeance of She	Za-Tor	
1974	The Odessa File	Franz Bayer	
1976	21 Hours at Munich	Interior Minister Bruno Merk	(final film role)
