= A Man for All Seasons (1988 film) =

1988 television film directed by Charlton Heston

- VHS cover
- Genre: Drama
- Based on: A Man for All Seasons; 1960 play by Robert Bolt
- Written by: Robert Bolt
- Directed by: Charlton Heston
- Starring: Charlton Heston; Vanessa Redgrave; Sir John Gielgud
- Music by: Julia Downes
- Country of origin: United States
- Original language: English

Production
- Executive producer: Peter Snell
- Producer: Fraser C. Heston
- Cinematography: Dennis Lewiston
- Editor: Eric Boyd-Perkins
- Running time: 150 minutes
- Production companies: Agamemnon Films; British Lion

Original release
- Network: TNT
- Release: December 21, 1988

A Man for All Seasons is a 1988 American made-for-television drama film about Sir Thomas More, directed by and starring Charlton Heston. It is based on the play of the same name by Robert Bolt, which was previously adapted in the Academy Award winning 1966 film A Man for All Seasons. It was the first made-for-television film produced on behalf of the TNT (Turner Network Television) television network.

The film stars Heston as More, Vanessa Redgrave (who had a small cameo in the version from 1966) as his wife Alice More, Sir John Gielgud as Cardinal Thomas Wolsey, Martin Chamberlain as King Henry VIII, Richard Johnson as the Duke of Norfolk (historically, Thomas Howard, 3rd Duke of Norfolk), and Roy Kinnear as the narrator, "The Common Man", who was cut from the previous film. (The "Common Man' functions in the manner of a Greek chorus throughout the play, appearing at crucial moments and seeming to comment on the action.)

The film follows the original stage play more literally and runs half an hour longer than the 1966 film, and could be considered "stagier" than that film, which divided the Common Man into several more realistic characters and omitted portions of the play.

== Plot ==
King Henry VIII, denied permission by the Pope to divorce his wife, orders the aristocracy of England to recognize him as head of the English church and renounce their Catholic faith. Sir Thomas More, a devout Catholic and Henry's chief minister, is a man of principle and reason, and is thus placed in a difficult position: should he stand up for his principles, risking the wrath of a King fond of executing those who displease him? Or should he bow to the seemingly unstoppable corruption of Henry VIII, who has no qualms about bending the law to suit his own needs?

== Cast ==
- Charlton Heston as Sir Thomas More
- Vanessa Redgrave as Alice More
- Richard Johnson as the Duke of Norfolk
- John Gielgud as Thomas Wolsey
- Roy Kinnear as The Common Man
- Benjamin Whitrow as Thomas Cromwell
- Adrienne Thomas as Margaret Roper
- Martin Chamberlain as Henry VIII
- John Hudson as William Roper
- Jonathan Hackett as Richard Rich
- Milton Cadman as Thomas Cranmer
- Nicholas Amer as Eustace Chapuys

== Reception ==
The film received generally positive critic reviews.

== Home media ==
Warner Bros. released a DVD in 2011.
