= 1966 New York Film Critics Circle Awards =

32nd New York Film Critics Circle Awards

32nd New York Film Critics Circle Awards

January 29, 1967
(announced December 27, 1966)

Best Picture:
A Man for All Seasons

The 32nd New York Film Critics Circle Awards, honored the best filmmaking of 1966.

== Winners ==
- Best Actor:
  - Paul Scofield - A Man for All Seasons
- Best Actress (tie):
  - Lynn Redgrave - Georgy Girl
  - Elizabeth Taylor - Who's Afraid of Virginia Woolf?
- Best Director:
  - Fred Zinnemann - A Man for All Seasons
- Best Film:
  - A Man for All Seasons
- Best Foreign Language Film:
  - The Shop on Main Street (Obchod na korze) • Czechoslovakia
- Best Screenplay:
  - Robert Bolt - A Man for All Seasons
