= Progress Estate =

Housing estate in Eltham, London

Coordinates: 51.4620°N 0.0476°E

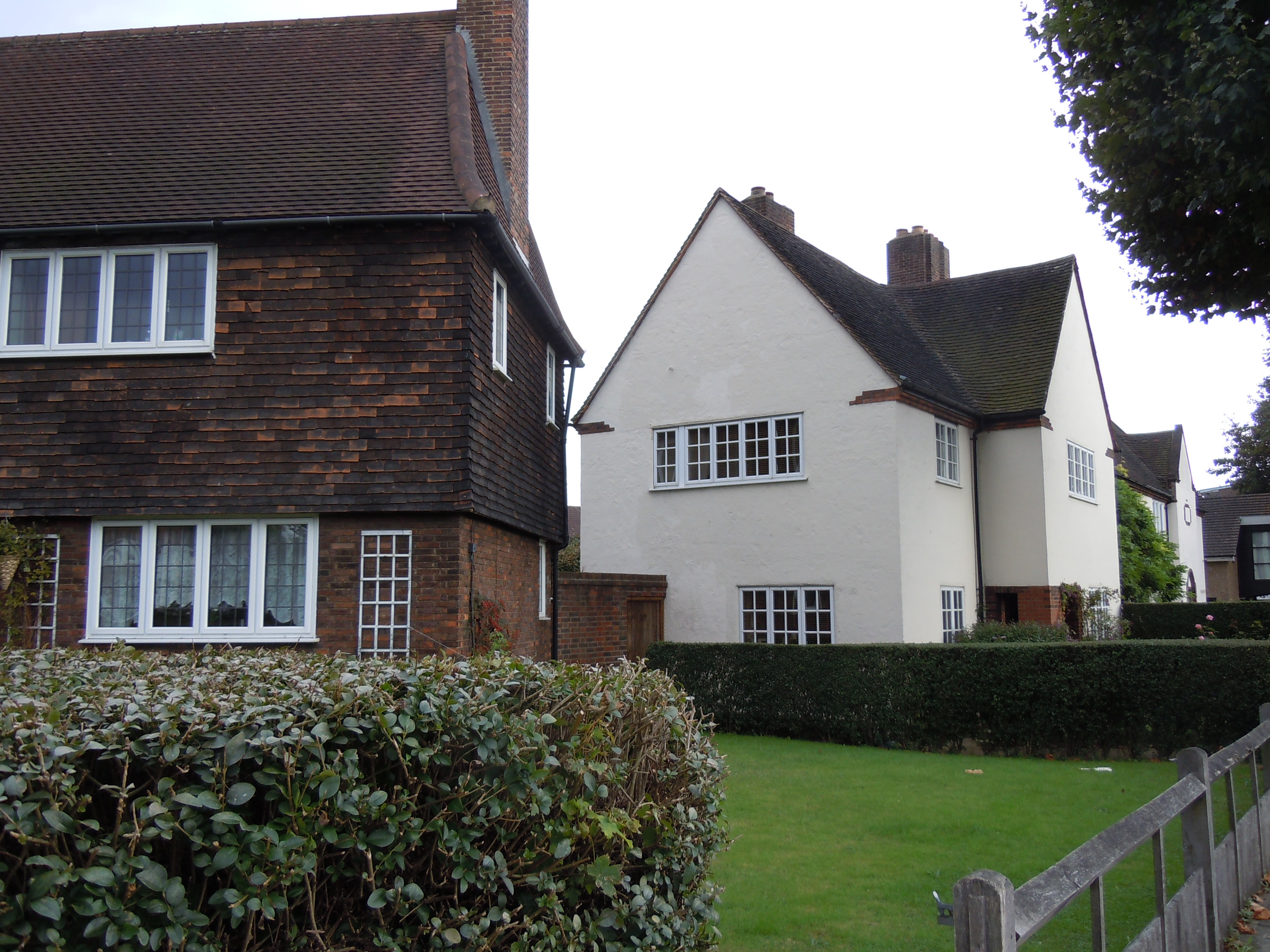
- Progress Estate conservation area
- Interactive map of Progress Estate

General information
- Location: Well Hall, Eltham, Greenwich, London, England
- Status: Completed

Construction
- Constructed: 1915

Other information
- Governing body: Royal Borough of Greenwich

The Progress Estate is a housing estate located in Well Hall, Eltham, in the Royal Borough of Greenwich, South East London. It was built in 1915 to house some of the senior and skilled workers employed at the nearby Royal Arsenal munitions factories in Woolwich.

== Location ==
The north/south Well Hall Road and the east/west Rochester Way cross about 600m north of Eltham railway station at the Well Hall roundabout. The 90-acre Progress Estate lies in the north-west, north-east and south-east quadrants of the crossroads. The Ordnance Survey map reference is TQ424755.

== Site selection and ownership ==
The Progress Estate, comprising 1,086 houses and 212 flats, was designed and built between January and December 1915 as a wartime measure under the Housing Act, 1914. The land was acquired from the Page Estate owned by the Polhill-Turner family. The architect was HM Office of Works. The Estate was not known as The Progress Estate until 1925, when the Office of Works sold it to Progress Estates Ltd, a subsidiary of the Royal Arsenal Co-operative Society. The site was selected for three reasons. First, it was the nearest available land of the required acreage to Woolwich. Second, the Eltham to Woolwich tram service (route 44, which opened on 23 July 1910) provided transport for Arsenal employees to and from their place of work. Third, the Bexleyheath railway line from Dartford to Blackheath (opened on 1 May 1895) enabled rapid transport of building materials to the site.

By 1980, and as a result of the Leasehold Reform Act, 1967, about 65% of the estate's homes had been purchased by their occupiers so Progress Estates sold the remainder to what is now Hyde Group, a social housing company, in 1980.

== Design ==
Although HM Office of Works had little if any history in the construction of housing estates, its principal architect, Mr. (later Sir) Frank Baines had four architects in the Office's employ who had previous domestic experience: Messrs. A Pitcher, G E Phillips, J A Bowden and G Parker. After each produced a site layout, Baines accepted one submitted by Phillips who had concluded the estate should look ‘as if it had grown and not merely been dropped there’. It has been described as 'the first and most spectacular of the garden suburbs built by the government during the First World War to house munitions workers.' The estate was intended from the start to be a showpiece solution to the emergency housing problems created by the war. Phillips' layout followed the low-density principles established by Richard Barry Parker and Raymond Unwin and others involved in the Garden city movement between 1900 and the outbreak of World War I. Faced with the acute wartime problems of materials supply, Baines's approach was to make use of all and any materials that might be available; architecturally the result was a tour-de-force of picturesque design. Variety in materials and finishes (timber-framing, tile-hanging, slate-hanging, stone, brick and rendering) was matched by the complexity of shape and silhouette, and combined with period details such as the raised pavement to produce a virtuoso re-creation of the ‘old English Village’. The uniqueness of the design of the estate still makes the area popular today.

Well Hall Road is the only road on the estate that preceded its construction. At the suggestion of HM Office of Works, London County Council – responsible at the time for the naming of all new roads in the Metropolis – selected the names of famous men who had lived in Woolwich and held high office at Woolwich Arsenal or the Dockyard; Congreve, Maudslay, Phineas Pett, Sandby, Shrapnel and Whinyates are examples. Sir William Congreve and his son both served as comptroller of the Royal Laboratories at the Royal Arsenal; machine tool pioneer Henry Maudslay worked at the Arsenal; Phineas Pett was master shipwright at the Dockyard from 1675 to 1678; artist Paul Sandby was chief drawing master at the Royal Military Academy from 1768 to 1799; Henry Shrapnel invented the shrapnel shell; and General Edward Charles Whinyates commanded the Royal Artillery base at Woolwich.

The estate was visited by Queen Mary in 1916. She met three residents in their houses before being driven to Woolwich Arsenal to inspect the canteen facilities.

The estate was granted Conservation Area status in 1975. The estate celebrated its 100-year anniversary in 2015.
