= Alice Harpur =

Alice Harpur may refer to:

- Dame Alice Harpur School
- Alice More Harpur, wife of Thomas More
