= Tudor Barn, Eltham =

Historic 16th century brick barn built in the southeast of London

Coordinates: 51°27′25″N 0°02′57″E

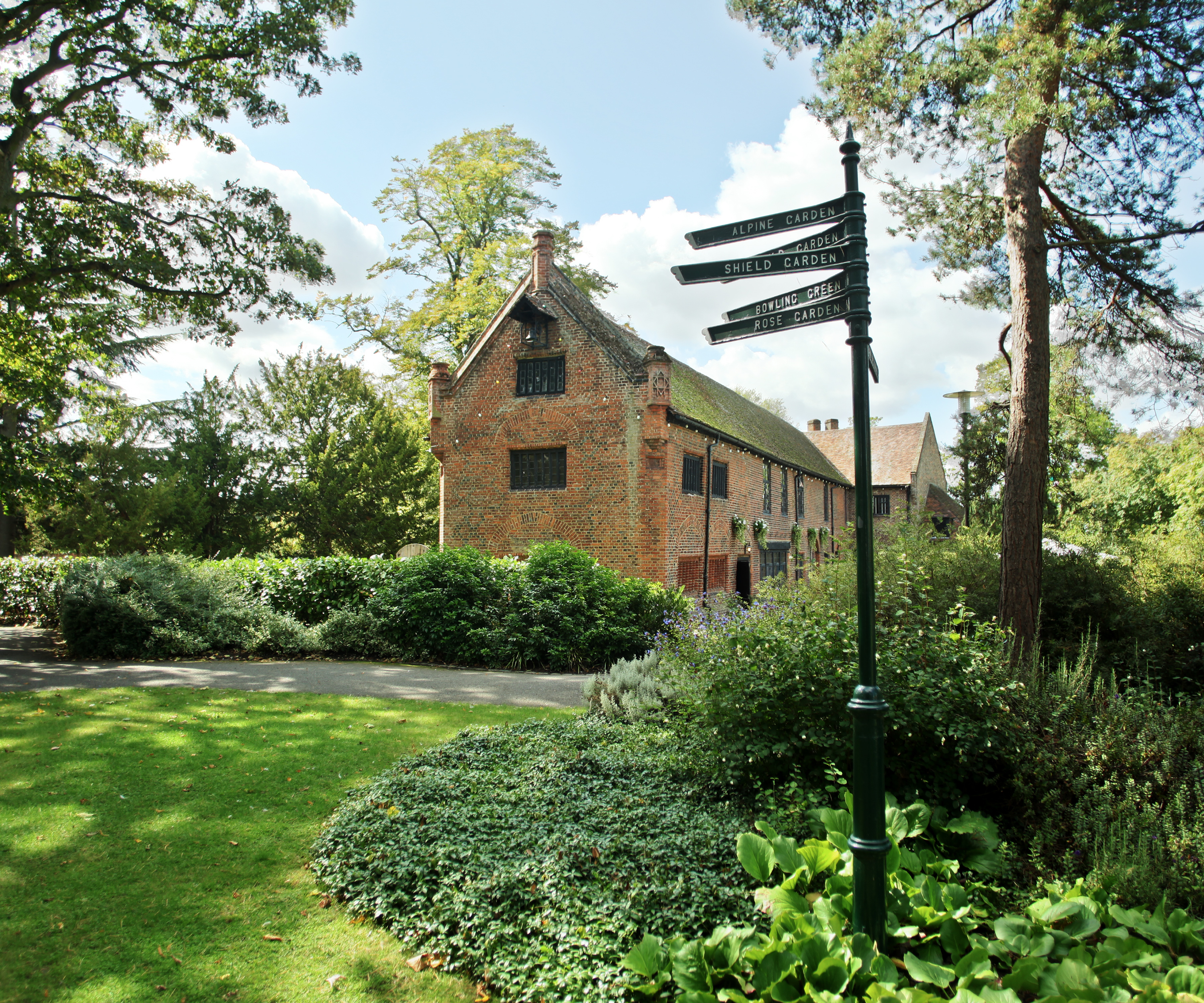

The Tudor Barn is a large brick barn in Eltham in the Royal Borough of Greenwich. It was built in 1525 by William Roper. The Ropers lived next door in a manor house in the centre of a moat for several years. William married Margaret More, the daughter of Thomas More, and one of the most learned women of sixteenth-century England. It is a Grade II* listed building (as Well Hall Art Gallery).

The west end of the Tudor Barn was mostly occupied by servants, as can be seen by the two huge chimneys there. However, the barn was also used for storage. It can be seen on old maps that the moat was directly connected to the Tudor Barn by a bridge.

Edith Nesbit, author of The Railway Children and co-founder of the Fabian Society, lived in a house in the grounds of the Tudor Barn from 1899 to 1921.

The Tudor Barn was refurbished in the 1930s. The Woolwich Borough Council then decided that they would use the newly renovated barn as the centrepiece of a new park, which is known as Well Hall Pleasaunce. The park opened in 1933, and three years later an art gallery was opened on the ground floor of the barn. This was not the council's original intention, however; they wanted a library and museum in the Tudor Barn, but these never materialised. For years after the Second World War, the barn contained the art gallery, a restaurant and a room for weddings and events in the upstairs space. The barn is currently run as a gastropub and events venue.

== Architecture ==
The barn is a two-storey building constructed of red brick, with a tiled roof. According to the Historic England listing for Well Hall Pleasaunce, sixteenth-century angle turrets survive at the west gable, while those at the east were restored around 1980. The south elevation has thirteen relieving arches and eleven windows, four of which remain in their original surrounds. At the west end of the building is a large offset chimney stack.
