= Coronet Cinema, Eltham =

Former cinema in Greenwich, London, England

Coordinates: 51°27′35″N 0°02′57″E

The Coronet Cinema when it was part of the Odeon chain.

The Coronet Cinema on Well Hall Road, by Well Hall Roundabout in Well Hall, Eltham, London, is a grade II listed building with Historic England in the streamline moderne style. It was designed by Andrew Mather and Horace Ward for Odeon Theatres and opened in 1936. In 1981 it became the Coronet Cinema but closed in 2000. The building became derelict and remained unused for over a decade, but was eventually converted and extended into 53 flats and a parade of shops, including a Tesco Express, and a gym and fitness centre. However, the main front of the building remains intact.
