= Margaret More =

Margaret More or Moore may refer to:

- Margaret Roper (1505–1544), née More, English writer and translator, daughter of Sir Thomas More
- Margaret Clement (1508–1570), née Giggs, English noblewoman, adopted daughter of Sir Thomas More
- Kate Barry (1752–1823), or Margaret Barry, née Moore, American Revolutionary War heroine
- Maggie Moore (1851–1926), American-Australian actress
- Margaret Hodges (1911–2005), née Moore, American author
- Margaret Moore (novelist), Canadian author
- Margaret Ann Moore, Canadian-American author and executive coach
- Margaret More (composer) (1903–1966), Welsh composer, daughter-in-law of Sir Granville Bantock
- Margaret Moore (academic), Canadian political theorist, academic and scholar
- Margaret Moore (tennis), English tennis player

== See also ==
- Margaret Moore Jeffus, American politician
- Maggie Moore(s), a 2023 American black comedy mystery film
