= Well Hall =

Coordinates: 51.45703°N 0.04920°E

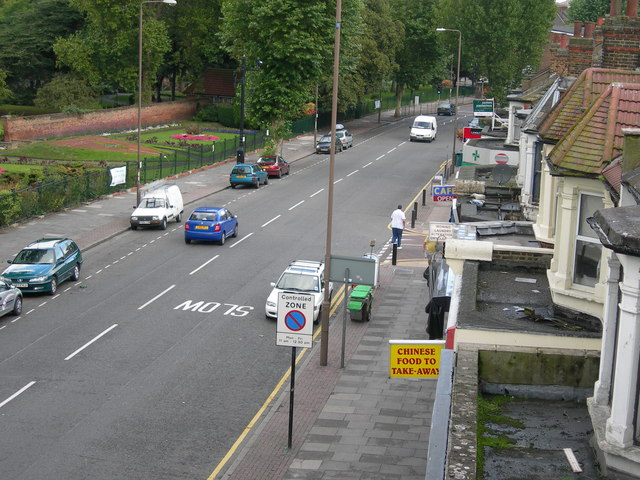
- Well Hall Road, London in 2006.

- Location within Greater London
- OS grid reference: TQ425749
  - Charing Cross: 8.4 mi (13.5 km) ESE
- London borough: Greenwich
- Ceremonial county: Greater London
- Region: London
- Country: England
- Sovereign state: United Kingdom
- Post town: LONDON
- Postcode district: SE9
- Dialling code: 020
- Police: Metropolitan
- Fire: London
- Ambulance: London
- UK Parliament: Eltham and Chislehurst
- London Assembly: Greenwich and Lewisham

Well Hall is a place to the north of Eltham in the Royal Borough of Greenwich in southeast London, England, with no present formal boundaries and located 13.5 km (8.4 mi) east-southeast of Charing Cross. In the past Well Hall was the grounds of a manor house, and then a hamlet. Today it is a largely residential suburb and housing estate absorbed by the development of Eltham and London. It is centred on the main road between Eltham and Woolwich, on which many shops and businesses are located. Several major A roads including the South Circular Road and A2 road pass through the area, as does a railway line, serving Eltham station which is located in Well Hall. The Postcode that covers Well Hall and most of the Eltham area is SE9, and the 020 dialing covers the entire Royal Borough of Greenwich. Well Hall is split across two electoral wards, Eltham West on the west side of Well Hall Road, and Eltham North on the east side of Well Hall Road. In 2015 the population of these two wards combined was recorded as 24,621, although the wards cover a larger area than just Well Hall.

== Name and toponymy ==
In 1100 two manors were recorded in the Eltham area, East-Horne and Well-hawe or Well-hall, probably corresponding to the areas later named Horn Park and Well Hall. The place was recorded as Wellehawe in 1401, then as Welhawe in 1446, meaning "a hedged enclosure by a spring or stream" from the Old English word Wella or Welle a spring or stream, and haga or hawe a hedged enclosure. On a 1746 map published by John Rocque it was recorded as Wale Hall, possibly erroneously. On a map by Emanuel Bowen from around 1762 it was also called Well Place. It was recorded as Well Hall on a 1797 map by Edward Hasted and in an 1801 Ordnance Survey map. The Hall part of the name refers to a Tudor mansion house that previously existed there built in the early sixteenth century.

== History ==
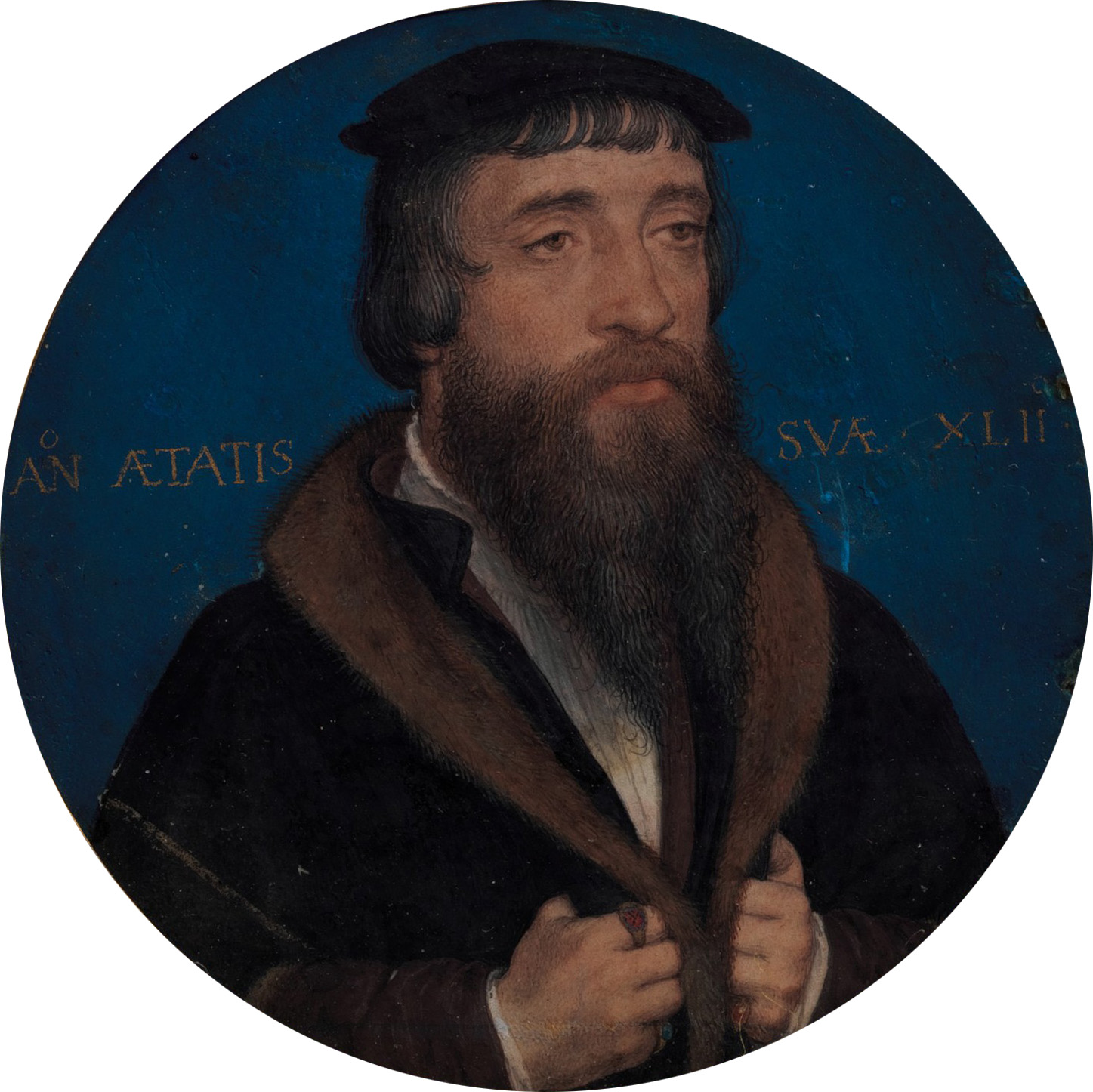
Lawyer and member of parliament William Roper owned Well Hall in the 16th century.

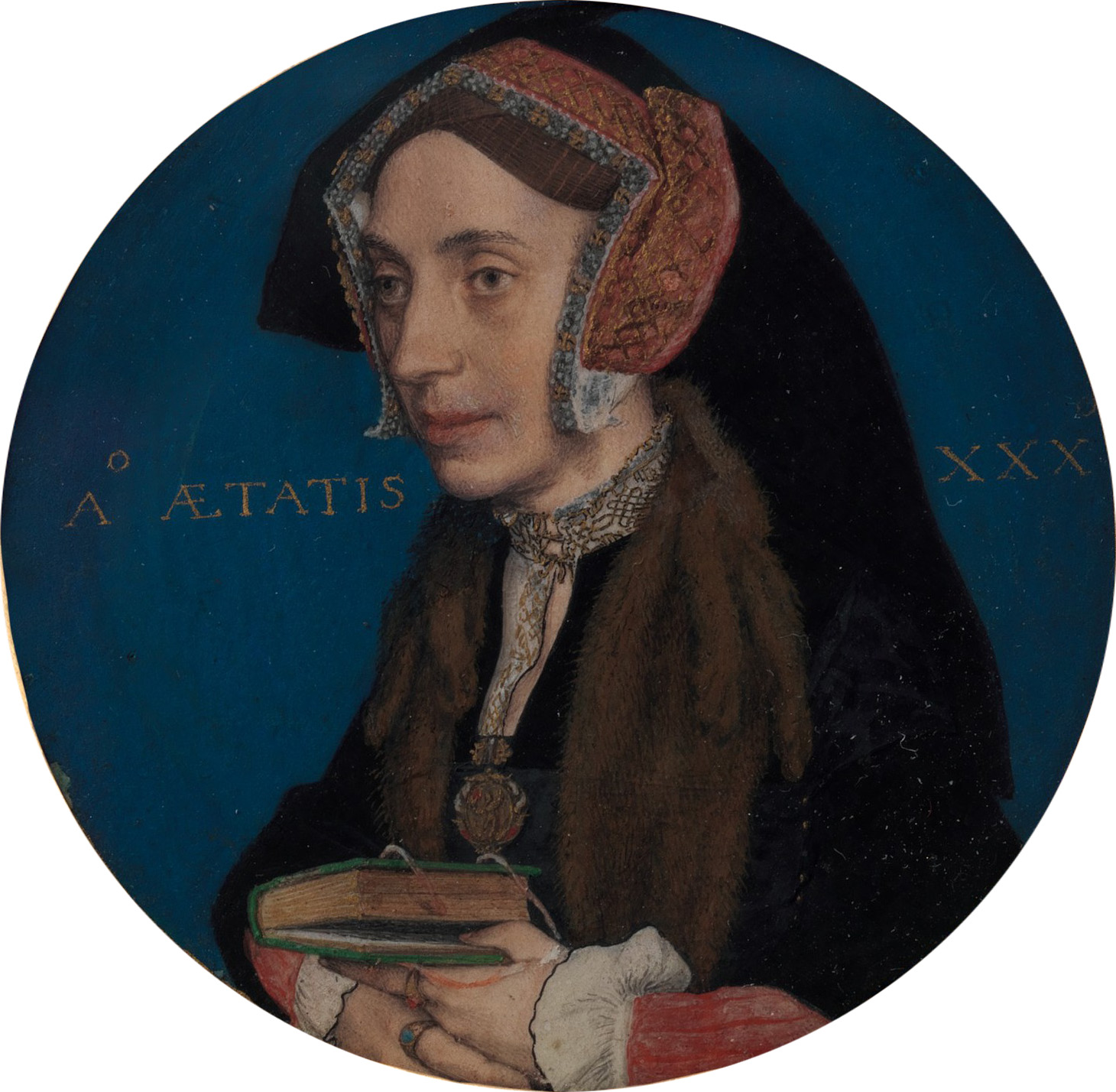
Writer and translator Margaret Roper lived with her husband William and their children at Well Hall in the 16th century.

In 1100 Jordan de Briset Lord of Clerkenwell was recorded as owning two manors in the Eltham area East-Horne and Well-hawe or Well-hall; the manor of Well Hall was also sometimes described as a mansion. These manors were recorded as being passed down and sold to numerous people including lawyer and member of parliament, William Roper and his wife, writer and translator, Margaret More, daughter of Thomas More in the sixteenth century. In around 1525 Tudor Barn which still stands today was constructed for William Roper next to the Well Hall manor house. In the 1730s, art collector, landowner, and baronet, Sir Gregory Page bought the property of Well Hall for £19,000 and had the mansion which was then dilapidated, demolished, but the moat and the Tudor Barn were left and remain to this day. Page had another mansion built on the grounds, known as Page House, and Well Hall House, which stood for two centuries before being demolished in 1930 or 1931. By 1746 Well Hall appeared on maps as a hamlet on a country lane junction, with Eltham close by on the road to the south, Shooters Hill, then Woolwich on the road to the north, and Kidbrooke on the road to the west. Author Edith Nesbit, also lived in a house in the grounds of the Tudor Barn from 1899 to 1921 with her husband Hubert Bland who died there in 1914.

During the Second World War, on 14 February 1944, Iris Miriam Deeley, a leading aircraftwoman with No 1 Balloon Centre RAF Kidbrooke was murdered near Well Hall railway station as she was returning to the Royal Air Force base. Ernest Kemp, was arrested a week later. He was tried and convicted of the murder at the Old Bailey and was executed at Wandsworth Prison on 6 June 1944.

=== History of administration ===
As part of the civil parish of Eltham, Well Hall was historically within the Hundred of Blackheath, in the Lathe of Sutton at Hone, in the west division of the county of Kent. In 1889 the parish of Eltham became part of the newly created County of London; in 1900 the County of London was divided into new districts, Well Hall and Eltham became part of the newly created Metropolitan Borough of Woolwich. In 1965 Greater London was created, Eltham and Well Hall along with most of the Metropolitan Borough of Woolwich became part of the London Borough of Greenwich, later renamed Royal Borough of Greenwich in 2012.

=== History of transport ===
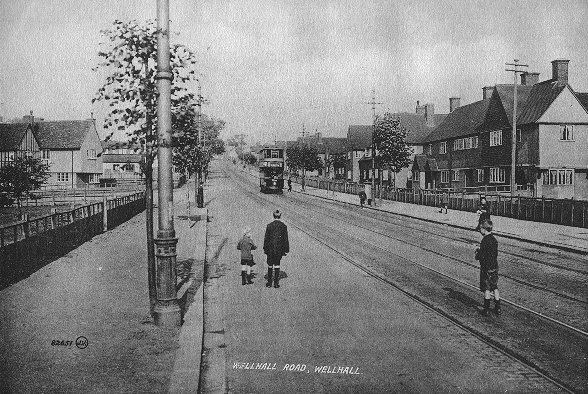
Tram travelling along Well Hall Road, 1912.

In 1905 the Metropolitan Borough of Woolwich council built Well Hall Road, a straight paved road, replacing the smaller winding country lane named Well Hall Lane, and Woolwich Lane, which went north from Eltham High Street through Well Hall toward Woolwich. In 1910 trams started running along Well Hall Road from Woolwich to Eltham, passing through Well Hall. In 1913 motorised buses began being used in the Woolwich borough and gradually replaced the horse-drawn omnibuses that were previously used. In 1932 another tram route was created along Westhorne Avenue running through Well Hall. The trams ran until the early 1950s when they were gradually phased out. In 1952 the trams in the Metropolitan borough of Woolwich ceased running and were the last in London to be withdrawn.

In the late nineteenth century, there were several proposals to build a railway line from London to Bexleyheath along different routes by numerous companies. The Bexleyheath Line was constructed, passing through Well Hall and eventually opened on 1 May 1895 with five stations including Well Hall all with wooden buildings. The railway station in Well Hall, was constructed on the west side of the main road and was originally just named Well Hall, but was later changed to Eltham, Well Hall. The railway station to the south of Eltham, was opened earlier in 1866 and was already using the name Eltham, this was later renamed to Mottingham. In 1908 another railway station opened on the Bexleyheath line, just under 500 metres to the east of Well Hall station, for the convenience of the first class passengers living in that area. It was originally named Shooters Hill & Eltham, but was renamed to Eltham Park in 1927 when the Bexleyheath line was electrified. In 1932 the buildings of Well Hall and some other stations on the line were rebuilt. In 1985 a new railway station and a bus station was constructed on the east side of Well Hall Road, opposite the old station. On 17 March 1985 the new station, simply named Eltham opened and Eltham Well Hall and Eltham Park stations closed. Well Hall station was completely demolished, but the street level entrance building at Eltham Park station still remains.

=== Eltham Well Hall rail crash ===
On 11 June 1972 at approximately 21:35, a train with a diesel locomotive and 10 coaches derailed near Eltham Well Hall station, when the driver took a sharp bend too fast. The speed limit for that section of track was 20 miles per hour (32 kilometres per hour), but according to eyewitness accounts, the train entered the bend travelling at about 65 miles per hour (105 kilometres per hour). The locomotive and first four coaches left the rails and came to rest at an angle to the track, the second and third coaches on their sides. The next five coaches were derailed but the 10th was not. Train driver Robert Wilsdon and five passengers were killed in the derailment, plus another 126 people were injured. An investigation revealed that the driver was intoxicated by alcohol.

=== Murder of Stephen Lawrence ===
On the evening 22 April 1993, Stephen Lawrence an 18-year-old Black British man from Plumstead was murdered in a racially motivated attack while waiting for a bus in Well Hall Road. The case became a cause célèbre and one of the highest profile racial killings in UK history; its fallout included profound cultural changes to attitudes on racism and the police, and to the law and police practice, and the partial revocation of double jeopardy laws, before two of the perpetrators were convicted almost 20 years later in 2012.

== Transport ==
=== Roads ===
There are several A roads in and around Well Hall. The main road running through Well Hall, is named Well Hall Road, it runs in a north south direction and is part of the A208 road, to the south it crosses Eltham High Street, changes its name to Court Road and goes toward Mottingham. On the west side of Well Hall is Westhorne Avenue, a dual carriageway which is part of the A205 road, London's South Circular Road, it runs mainly in a southwest–northeast direction and joins with Well Hall Road at the north side Well Hall, at roundabout named Well Hall Roundabout. From Well Hall Roundabout the South Circular A205 road continues north toward Woolwich, but no longer a dual carriageway and keeps the name of Well Hall Road; to the southwest Westhorne Avenue goes toward Horn Park, then Hither Green where it also ceases to be a dual carriageway and changes its name. Rochester Way Relief Road cuts through Well Hall in a mainly east–west direction, it is a major dual carriageway road and part of the A2 road; it passes under Well Hall Road with no junction and crosses over Wethorne Avenue with a fly over and a grade separated junction. To the west the A2 road travels to Kidbrooke where it turns north toward the Blackwall Tunnel, to the east, the A2 road goes through Bexley and eventually Kent and the coast. Eltham High Street, part of the A210 road, is to the south of Well Hall, it passes through in an east–west direction, to the west it goes to Lee and Lewisham, and east toward Avery Hill and Bexley.

=== Buses ===
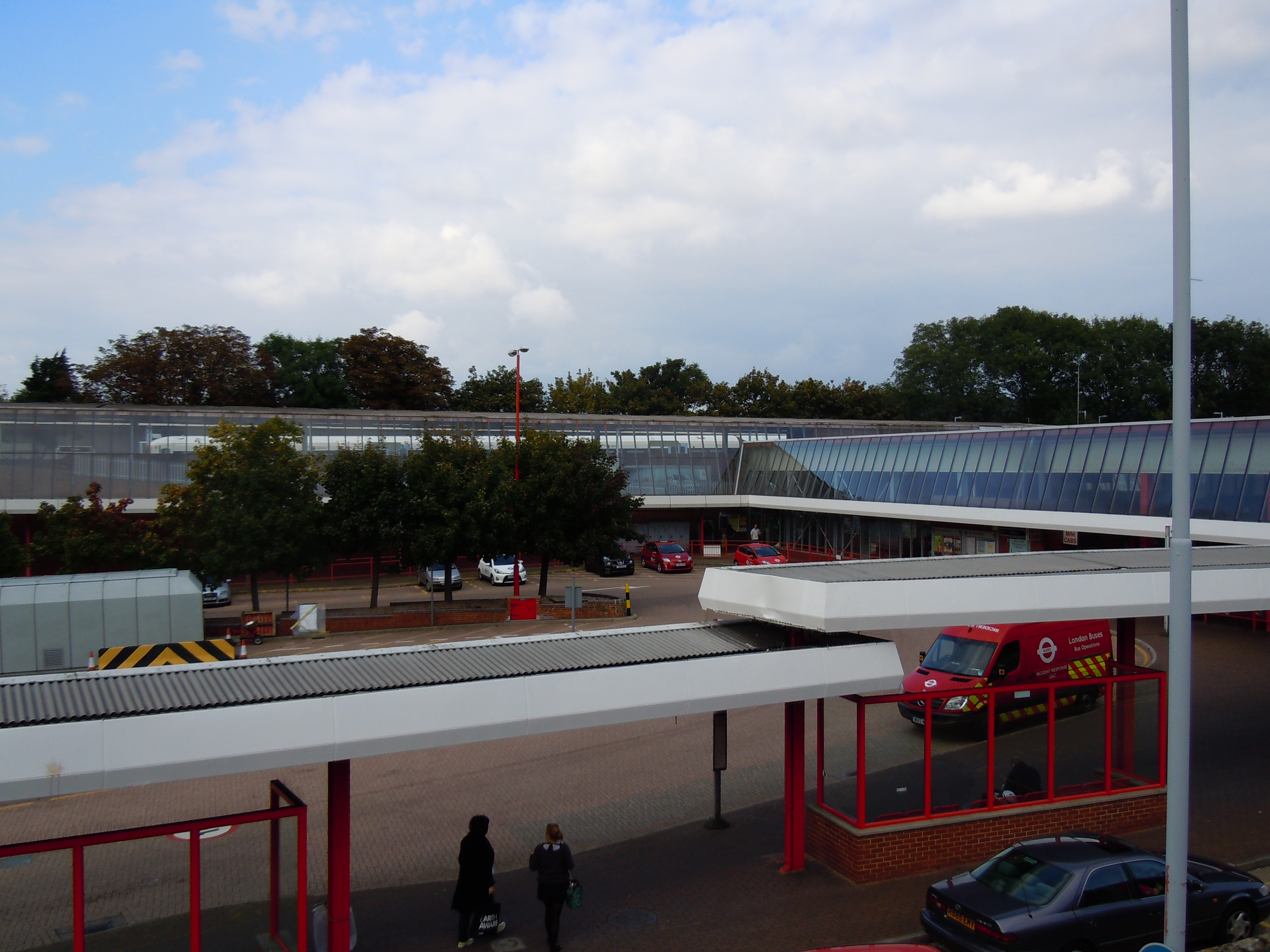
Eltham bus and train station on Well Hall Road.

There are several bus stops along both sides of Well Hall Road, plus a bus station on the east side of the road adjacent to the train station. Six London Buses routes serve Well Hall, three terminate and begin there at Eltham railway station, and three pass through; all six of these also pass through or across Eltham High Street to the south, where another seven London Bus routes also serve. Route 162 begins at Well Hall by Eltham railway station and visits Eltham, Avery Hill, New Eltham, Chislehurst, Bickley, Bromley and Beckenham. route 233 starts at Well Hall by Eltham railway station, and travels through Eltham, New Eltham, Sidcup, Foots Cray, Ruxley and Swanley. route 314 starts at Well Hall by Eltham railway station, and travels through Eltham, New Eltham, Elstead, Sundridge, and Bromley. route 132 begins at Greenwich then goes to Kidbrooke, Well Hall, Eltham, Avery Hill, Bexley and Bexleyheath. route 161 begins at Greenwich then goes to Woolwich, Well Hall, Eltham, Mottingham and Chislehurst. route 286 begins at Greenwich then goes to Kidbrooke, Well Hall, Eltham, Avery Hill and Sidcup. Eltham High Street, to the south is also served by London Buses 124, 126, 160, 321, B15, B16, and night bus N21.

=== Rail ===
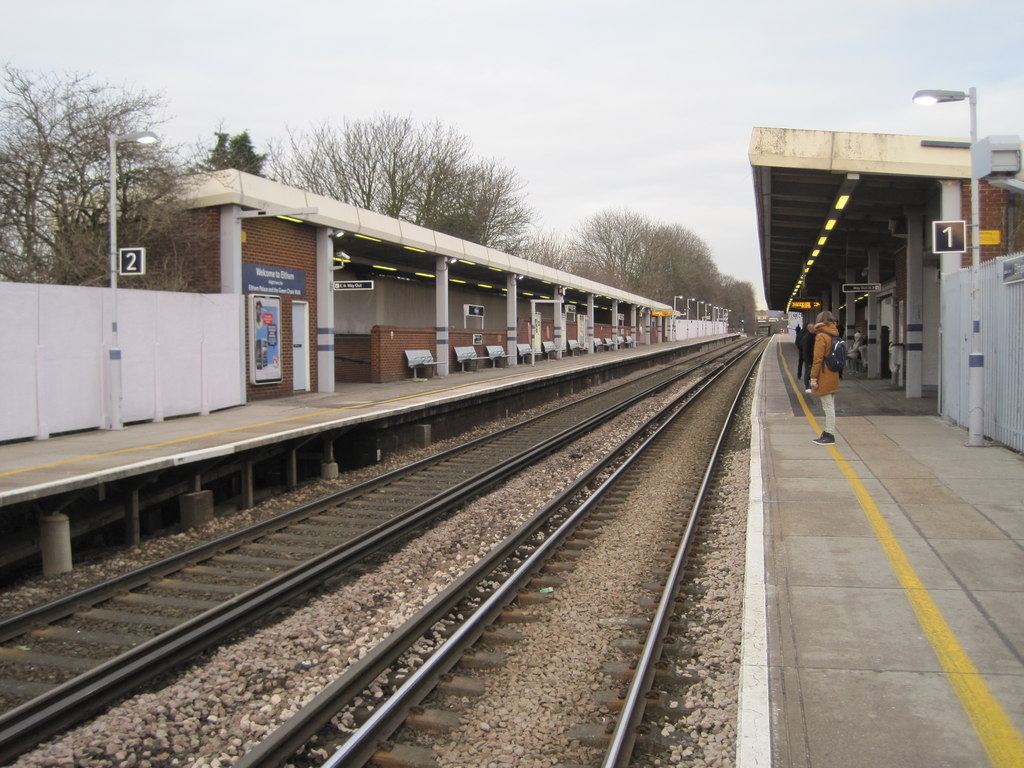
Eltham railway station.

Eltham railway station is on the east side of Well Hall Road, built in 1985, partially above the A2 road, replacing the stations at Eltham Well Hall and Eltham Park on the same line. The railway line crosses east to west passing over both Well Hall Road and Rochester Way, to the east is central London stations, and to the west Dartford and other Kent stations. It is in London fare zone 4, operated by Southeastern and on the Bexleyheath Line. The station has two platforms, platform 1 for services to Central London and platform 2 for Dartford. There are two trains per hour to London Charing Cross, London Cannon Street, London Victoria, Barnehurst and four trains per hour to Dartford.

== Progress Estate ==
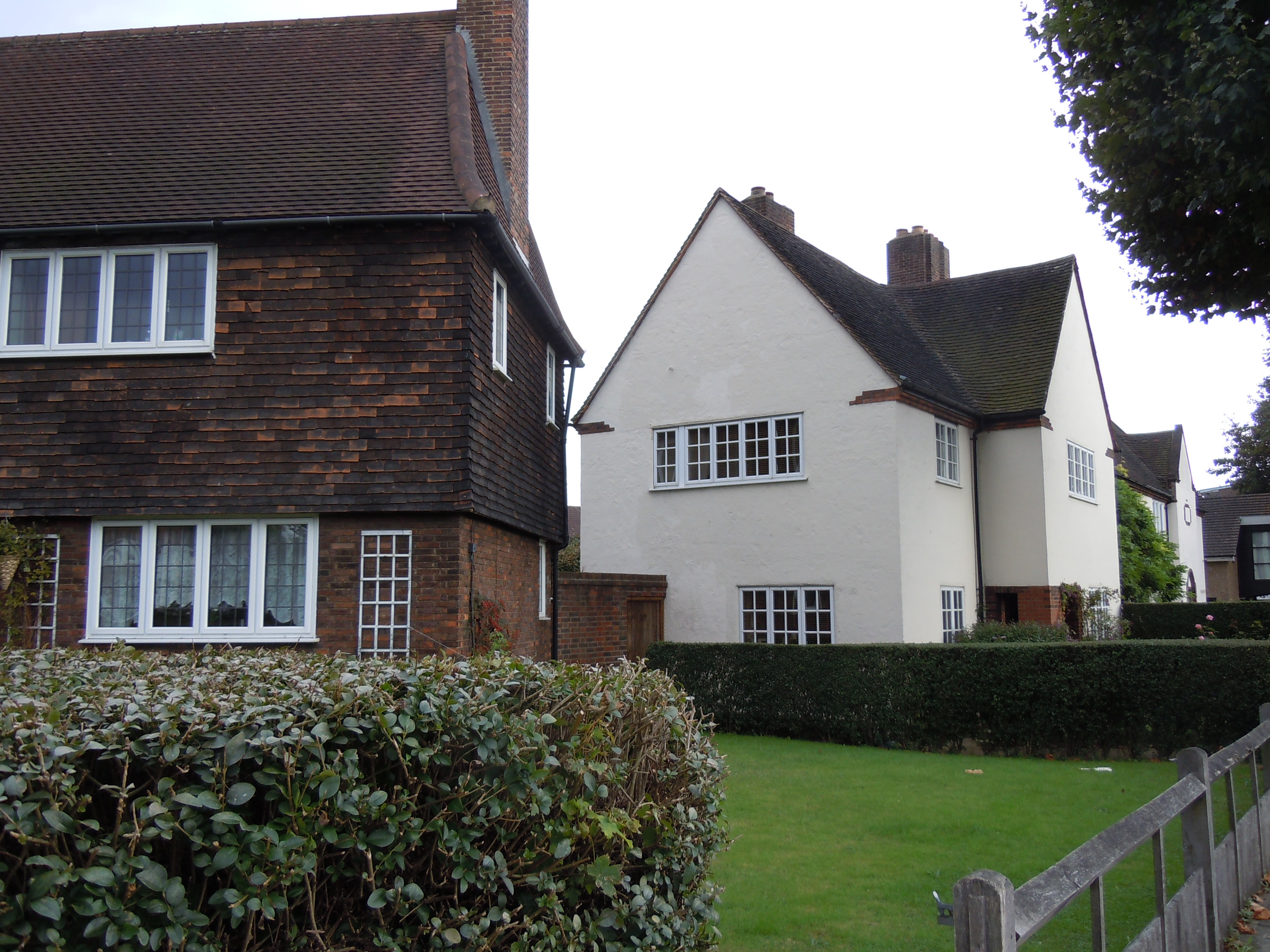
Houses of the Progress Estate.

The Progress Estate is a housing estate located immediately east of Well Hall Road, north of Eltham railway station and Rochester Way. It was built in 1915 as a wartime measure under the Housing Act, 1914 by HM Office of Works and was visited by Queen Mary in 1916. It was not known as The Progress Estate until 1925, when it was sold on to the Royal Arsenal Co-operative Society. It was built on the tram route along the recently created Well Hall Road, which linked the area to Woolwich, to house some the senior and skilled workers from the nearby Woolwich Arsenal munitions factories which were in use during the First World War. The estate comprises 1,086 houses and 212 flats and has been described as "the first and most spectacular of the garden suburbs built by the government during the First World War to house munitions workers" Its unique design makes the area popular today. In 1975, the estate was granted Conservation Area status.

== Well Hall Pleasaunce and Tudor Barn ==
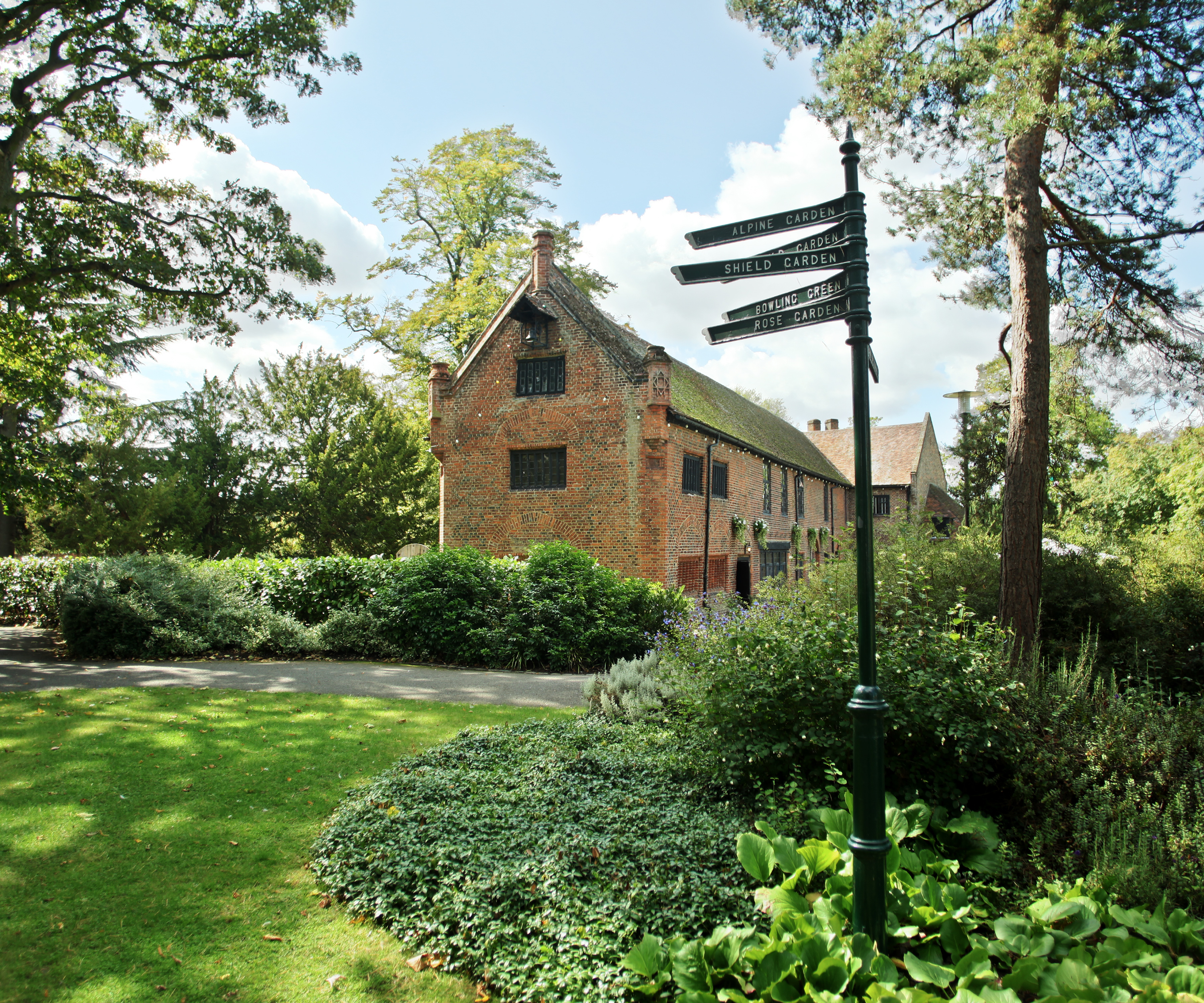
Tudor Barn, in Well Hall Pleasaunce.

On the west side of Well Hall Road in Well Hall Pleasaunce is the Tudor Barn, a large brick barn, despite the stone plaque stating the year 1568, it is believed to be built around 1525, for William Roper and his wife Margaret More, the daughter of Thomas More It was built next to his family home Well Hall a moated manor house, now demolished, which gave its name to the place. Today Tudor Barn is a Grade II* listed building as Well Hall Art Gallery.

In 1933 the Metropolitan Borough of Woolwich council opened Well Hall Pleasaunce and the recently refurbished Tudor Barn served as a centrepiece to the new park. Originally there were plans to open a library and museum in the barn, but instead an art gallery was opened on the ground floor in 1936, and the space upstairs was used as a restaurant and reception room for weddings and other events. The path that runs along the southern edge of Well Hall Pleasaunce is named Edith Nesbit Walk after the author that lived there for over twenty years at the beginning of the twentieth century.

== Coronet Cinema ==
The Coronet Cinema is located on Well Hall Road, by Well Hall Roundabout, it is a grade II listed building with Historic England in the streamline moderne style. It was designed by Andrew Mather and Horace Ward for Odeon Theatres and opened in 1936. In 1981 it became the Coronet Cinema but closed in 2000. The building became derelict and remained unused for over a decade, it was eventually converted and extended into 53 flats and a parade of shops including a Tesco Express, and a gym and fitness centre, but the main front of the building remains intact.

== Blackheath F.C. ==
Blackheath Football Club is a rugby union club, whose grounds are located on Kidbrooke Lane, north of Well Hall Pleasaunce and can hold 1650 spectators, 550 seated. They play National League 1, the third tier of the English rugby union system, in Well Hall, having moved from the famous Rectory Field in Blackheath at the end of the 2015–16 season. The club was founded in 1858 and is the oldest open rugby club in the world since becoming open in 1862 and is also the third-oldest rugby club in continuous existence in the world.

== Notable people ==
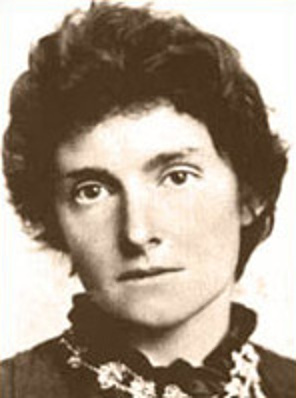
Author Edith Nesbit lived in Well Hall from 1899 to 1921.

- William Roper, (c. 1496–1578) lawyer and member of parliament, owned and lived at Well Hall in the 16th century with his wife Margaret, and ordered the building of Tudor Barn
- Margaret Roper, (1505–1544) writer and translator, daughter of Sir Thomas More, lived in Well Hall in the 16th century.
- Sir Gregory Page, 2nd Baronet, (c. 1695–1775) art collector, landowner, and baronet, bought Well Hall manor in the 1730s and had it demolished and rebuilt.
- John Arnold, (1736–1799) watchmaker and inventor, owned watchmaking factory in Well Hall, in the 1780s and 90s where he died.
- Edith Nesbit, (1858–1924) author (mainly of children's books), co-founder of the Fabian Society, lived in Well Hall from 1899 to 1921.
- Hubert Bland, (1855–1914) husband of Edith Nesbit, journalist, and socialist. Lived with his wife at Well Hall from 1899 until his death there in 1914.
- Bob Hope, (1903–2003) actor, singer and comedian was born in a terraced house, at 44 Craigton Road in Well Hall. A British Film Institute 'Centenary of Cinema' plaque was placed on the front of the house in 1996.
- Frankie Howerd, (1917–1992) comedian and actor lived in Well Hall as a child in Arbroath Road. The church hall of St Barnabas' Church on Rochester Way was renamed The Frankie Howerd Centre in the 1980s, he was a member of the choir at the church in his youth.
- Sylvia Syms, (1934–2023) movie, television and stage actress. Grew up in Well Hall in Maudsley Road in the 1930s.

== Bibliography ==
- Nicholson Greater London Street Atlas Comprehensive Edition ISBN 0-583-33291-9
- A Dictionary of London Place Names (2001), by A.D. Mills pp. 264–265 "Well Hall" entry ISBN 978-0-19-956678-5
- The History and Topographical Survey of the County of Kent: Volume 1 by Edward Hasted (Canterbury, 1797)
- London Gazetteer by Russ Willey, (Chambers 2006) ISBN 0-550-10326-0
- The Woolwich Story, 1890–1965 by Edward Francis Ernest Jefferson (Woolwich & District Antiquarian Society, 1970) ISBN 0-950-13520-8
- Eltham and Woolwich tramways (Middleton, 1996) ISBN 1-873-79374-X
