= A Man for All Seasons (1966 film) =

1966 film by Fred Zinnemann

- Original film poster by Howard Terpning
- Directed by: Fred Zinnemann
- Screenplay by: Robert Bolt
- Based on: A Man for All Seasons; 1960 play by Robert Bolt
- Produced by: Fred Zinnemann
- Starring: Wendy Hiller; Leo McKern; Robert Shaw; Orson Welles; Susannah York; Paul Scofield
- Cinematography: Ted Moore
- Edited by: Ralph Kemplen
- Music by: Georges Delerue
- Production company: Highland Films
- Distributed by: Columbia Pictures
- Release dates: 12 December 1966 (USA); March 1967 (UK)
- Running time: 120 minutes
- Country: United Kingdom
- Language: English
- Budget: $2 million
- Box office: $28.4 million

A Man for All Seasons is a 1966 British historical drama film directed and produced by Fred Zinnemann, adapted by Robert Bolt from his play of the same name. It depicts the final years of Sir Thomas More, the 16th-century Lord Chancellor of England who refused both to sign a letter asking Pope Clement VII to annul Henry VIII of England's marriage to Catherine of Aragon and to take an Oath of Supremacy declaring Henry Supreme Head of the Church of England.

Paul Scofield, who had played More in the West End stage premiere, also took the role in the film, starring alongside Wendy Hiller, Robert Shaw, Susannah York, and Orson Welles. Also appearing are Nigel Davenport, Leo McKern, Corin Redgrave, Vanessa Redgrave and, in one of his earliest screen roles, John Hurt. The film was released by Columbia Pictures on 12 December 1966.

A Man for All Seasons was a critical and box-office success. It won the Academy Award for Best Picture at the 39th Academy Awards, while the cast and crew won another five, including Best Director for Zinnemann and Best Actor for Scofield. It also won the Golden Globe Award for Best Motion Picture – Drama and the BAFTA Awards for Best Film and Best British Film. In 1999, the British Film Institute named it the 43rd greatest British film of all time.

== Title ==
The title reflects playwright Bolt's portrayal of More as the ultimate man of conscience, remaining true to his principles and religion under all circumstances and at all times. Bolt borrowed the title from Robert Whittington, a contemporary of More, who in 1520 wrote of him:

More is a man of an angel's wit and singular learning. I know not his fellow. For where is the man of that gentleness, lowliness and affability? And, as time requireth, a man of marvellous mirth and pastimes, and sometime of as sad gravity. A man for all seasons.

== Plot ==
The film covers the years 1529 to 1535, during the reign of Henry VIII.

During a private late-night meeting at Hampton Court, Cardinal Wolsey, Lord Chancellor of England, chastises More for being the only member of the privy council to oppose Wolsey's attempts to obtain from the Pope an annulment of Henry VIII's marriage to Catherine of Aragon, as their marriage has not produced a male heir. With the annulment, Henry would be able to marry Anne Boleyn, with whom he hopes to father such an heir and avoid a repeat of the Wars of the Roses. More says that he cannot agree to Wolsey's suggestion that they apply "pressure" on church property and revenue in England. Unbeknownst to More, the conversation is being overheard by Wolsey's ambitious aide, Thomas Cromwell.

Returning to his home at Chelsea at dawn, More finds his young acquaintance Richard Rich waiting for his return to lobby for a position at Court. More instead offers Rich a job as a teacher. Rich declines More's offer, saying that teaching would offer him little chance to become well known. More finds his daughter Meg chatting with a brilliant young lawyer, William Roper, who announces his desire to marry her. The devout Catholic More says he cannot give his blessing as long as Roper remains a Lutheran, who are considered members of the heretical Protestant movement.

Wolsey is dismissed from office when the annulment is not granted and dies in disgrace in a rural monastery, with More succeeding him as Lord Chancellor. The King makes an "impromptu" visit to the More estate and again requests More's support for an annulment. Still, More remains unmoved as Henry alternates between threats, tantrums, and promises of unbounded royal favors. Cromwell, now the King's Principal Secretary, bribes Rich with the promise of a position at Court if he will spy on More.

Roper, learning of More's quarrel with the King, says that his religious views have altered considerably and declares that by attacking the Church, the King has become "the Devil's minister." More admonishes Roper to be more guarded when Rich again pleads for More to grant him an office. When More again refuses, Rich denounces More's steward as a spy for Cromwell. An unmoved More responds, "Of course, that's one of my servants." Humiliated, Rich ends his friendship with More.

Meanwhile, the King orders Parliament and the bishops to declare him "Supreme Head of the Church of England". Embracing Caesaropapism, the bishops and Parliament accede to the King's demands and renounce all allegiance to the Pope. More quietly resigns as Lord Chancellor rather than accept the new order. His close friend and successor, Thomas Howard, attempts to draw out his opinions in a friendly private chat, but More knows that the time for speaking openly of such matters is over.

In a meeting with Norfolk, Cromwell implies that More's troubles will be over if he attends the King's wedding to Boleyn. After More does not, he is summoned again to Hampton Court and interrogated mercilessly by Cromwell. More refuses to answer any questions, and an infuriated Cromwell sends him away. The Thames boatmen are aware of the King's hostility to More and refuse to ferry him, so More returns home on foot.

As More finally arrives, his daughter Meg informs him that a new oath is being circulated and that all must take it or face charges of high treason. Initially, More says he might be willing to take the oath, depending on its wording. Upon learning that it names the King as head of the church, legitimizes his Lutheran heirs, and allows no legal or moral loopholes, More refuses to take it and is imprisoned in the Tower of London.

At an inquiry chaired by Cromwell and Norfolk, More remains steadfast in his refusal to take the oath and refuses to explain, knowing that he cannot be convicted if he has not explicitly denied the King's supremacy. Cromwell punishes More by confiscating his prized collection of books. As Rich collects the books, he and his former friend share a final debate over More's choices. More says goodbye to his wife Alice, Meg, and Roper, urging them not to try to defend him, but to leave the country.

At his trial, More refuses to express an opinion about the King's second marriage or why he will not take the oath, based upon the legal principle that silence is to be interpreted as consent. Cromwell calls Rich to testify. Rich alleges that, when he went to confiscate More's books, More told him that while Parliament has the power to dethrone the King, it does not have the authority to make the King the head of the church.

A horrified More offers to take any oath required by the court that he never said any such thing to Rich. More adds that he would never be so suicidal as to entrust so dangerous an opinion "to such a man as that." As Rich leaves the witness box, it emerges that Rich has been made attorney general for Wales as a reward from Cromwell for committing perjury, much to More's chagrin.

Under a direct order from Cromwell, the jury convicts More without leaving the courtroom to deliberate. But as the judges begin to pronounce the death penalty, More interrupts and reminds them that prisoners are to be asked before sentencing if they have anything to say.

Upon being so asked by the judges, More declares that he does. More calls Parliament's Act of Supremacy repugnant to every legal precedent and institution in all the history of Christendom. He cites the biblical foundation for the Petrine Primacy and the authority of the papacy, rather than national governments, over the church. Furthermore, he declares that the church's freedom from state control and interference is guaranteed both in the Magna Carta and in the King's own coronation oath. As uproar ensues, the judges sentence More to death by beheading.

The scene switches from the court to Tower Hill on July 6th, 1535, where More observes custom by pardoning and tipping the executioner. More declares, "I die his Majesty's good servant, but God's first." He kneels at the block and, off-screen, the executioner cuts off More's head.

In the epilogue, a narrator describes the aftermath and the fates of those involved in More's downfall, with Thomas Cromwell himself beheaded for treason five years later, Archbishop Cranmer being burned at the stake, and Norfolk narrowly avoiding his own execution due to Henry's death from syphilis. The only exception is Richard Rich, who "became Chancellor of England, and died in his bed."

== Cast ==
- Paul Scofield as Sir Thomas More
- Wendy Hiller as Alice More
- Leo McKern as Thomas Cromwell
- Orson Welles as Cardinal Wolsey
- Robert Shaw as King Henry VIII
- Susannah York as Margaret More
- Nigel Davenport as the Duke of Norfolk
- John Hurt as Richard Rich
- Corin Redgrave as William Roper
- Colin Blakely as Matthew
- Cyril Luckham as Archbishop Thomas Cranmer
- Vanessa Redgrave as Anne Boleyn
- Jack Gwillim as Chief Justice
- Michael Latimer as Norfolk's Aide
- Thomas Heathcote as Boatman
- Yootha Joyce as Averil Machin
- Anthony Nicholls as King's Representative
- John Nettleton as Jailer
- Eira Heath as Matthew's Wife
- Molly Urquhart as Maid
- Paul Hardwick as Courtier
- Philip Brack as Captain of the Guard
- Martin Boddey as Governor of Tower
- Eric Mason as Executioner
- Matt Zimmerman as Messenger
- Nick Tate as Masters at Arms

== Adaptation ==
Robert Bolt adapted the screenplay himself. The running commentary of The Common Man was deleted and the character was divided into the roles of the Thames boatman, More's steward, an innkeeper, the jailer from the Tower, the jury foreman, and the executioner. The subplot involving the imperial ambassador Eustace Chapuys was also excised. A few minor scenes were added, including Wolsey's death, More's investiture as Chancellor, and Henry's wedding to Anne Boleyn, to cover narrative gaps left by the exclusion of the Common Man.

The Brechtian staging of the final courtroom scene (which depicted the Jury as consisting of the Common Man and several sticks bearing the hats of the various characters he has played) is changed to a more naturalistic setting. Also, while the Duke of Norfolk was the judge both historically and in the play's depiction of the trial, the character of the Chief Justice (Jack Gwillim) was created for the film. Norfolk is still present, but plays little role in the proceedings.

== Production ==
The producers initially feared that Scofield was not a big enough name to draw in audiences, so the producers approached Richard Burton, who turned down the part. Laurence Olivier was also considered, but Zinnemann demanded that Scofield be cast. He played More both in London's West End and on Broadway; the latter appearance led to a Tony Award.

Alec Guinness was the studio's first choice to play Wolsey, and Peter O'Toole its first choice for Henry. Richard Harris was also considered. Bolt wanted film director John Huston to play Norfolk, but he refused. Vanessa Redgrave was originally to have played Margaret, but she had a theatre commitment. She agreed to a cameo as Anne Boleyn on the condition that she not be billed in the part or mentioned in the previews. Zinneman cast actor John Hurt in his first major film role, on the basis of a strong performance in David Halliwell's Little Malcolm and His Struggle Against the Eunuchs.

To keep the budget at under $2 million, the actors all took salary cuts. Only Scofield, York, and Welles were paid more than £10,000. For playing Rich, John Hurt was paid £3,000. Vanessa Redgrave appeared simply for the fun of it and refused payment.

Leo McKern had played the Common Man in the original West End production of the show, but had been shifted to Cromwell for the Broadway production. He and Scofield are the only members of the cast to appear in both the stage and screen versions of the story. Vanessa Redgrave played Lady Alice in a 1988 remake.

The film is shot in Technicolor. The location used to represent Thomas More's house in Chelsea was Studley Priory in Oxfordshire.

== Reception ==
=== Box office ===
The film was a box office success, making $28,350,000 in the US alone, making it the fifth highest-grossing film of 1966.

=== Critical reception ===
A Man for All Seasons received positive reviews from film critics, with an 89% "Fresh" rating on review aggregator Rotten Tomatoes and an average rating of 7.70/10, based on 82 reviews. The critics' consensus states: "Solid cinematography and enjoyable performances from Paul Scofield and Robert Shaw add a spark to this deliberately paced adaptation of the Robert Bolt play." On Metacritic, the film holds a weighted average score of 72 out of 100 based on 11 critics, indicating "generally favorable reviews". A. D. Murphy of Variety wrote: "Producer-director Fred Zinnemann has blended all filmmaking elements into an excellent, handsome and stirring film version of A Man for All Seasons."

Scofield's performance was particularly praised. Kate Cameron of the New York Daily News wrote, "over all these fine performances, including Robert Shaw's opulent, bluff and forceful representation of the king, it is Scofield who dominates the screen with his genteel voice and steadfast refusal to kowtow to the king, even at the expense of his head." Pauline Kael gave the film a more critical review, writing, "There's more than a little of the school pageant in the rhythm of the movie: Though it's neater than our school drama coaches could make it, the figures group and say their assigned lines and move on."

In 1995, on the occasion of the 100th anniversary of cinema, the Vatican included it among its list of important films. In 1999, British Film Institute named A Man for All Seasons the 43rd greatest British film of all time. In 2008, it came 106th on Empire magazine's 500 Greatest Movies of All Time list.

=== Accolades ===
Award	Category	Nominee(s)	Result	Ref.
Academy Awards	Best Picture	Fred Zinnemann	Won	
Academy Awards	Best Director	Fred Zinnemann	Won	
Academy Awards	Best Actor	Paul Scofield	Won	
Academy Awards	Best Supporting Actor	Robert Shaw	Nominated	
Academy Awards	Best Supporting Actress	Wendy Hiller	Nominated	
Academy Awards	Best Screenplay – Based on Material from Another Medium	Robert Bolt	Won	
Academy Awards	Best Cinematography – Color	Ted Moore	Won	
Academy Awards	Best Costume Design – Color	Joan Bridge and Elizabeth Haffenden	Won	
British Academy Film Awards	Best Film from any Source	Fred Zinnemann	Won	
British Academy Film Awards	Best British Film	Fred Zinnemann	Won	
British Academy Film Awards	Best British Actor	Paul Scofield	Won	
British Academy Film Awards	Best British Screenplay	Robert Bolt	Won	
British Academy Film Awards	Best British Art Direction – Colour	John Box	Won	
British Academy Film Awards	Best British Cinematography – Colour	Ted Moore	Won	
British Academy Film Awards	Best British Costume Design – Colour	Elizabeth Haffenden and Joan Bridge	Won	
Directors Guild of America Awards	Outstanding Directorial Achievement in Motion Pictures	Fred Zinnemann	Won	
Golden Globe Awards	Best Motion Picture – Drama		Won	
Golden Globe Awards	Best Actor in a Motion Picture – Drama	Paul Scofield	Won	
Golden Globe Awards	Best Supporting Actor – Motion Picture	Robert Shaw	Nominated	
Golden Globe Awards	Best Director – Motion Picture	Fred Zinnemann	Won	
Golden Globe Awards	Best Screenplay – Motion Picture	Robert Bolt	Won	
Kansas City Film Critics Circle Awards	Best Actor	Paul Scofield	Won (Note: Tied with Rod Steiger for In the Heat of the Night.)	
Kansas City Film Critics Circle Awards	Best Supporting Actor	Robert Shaw	Won (Note: Tied with Alec Guinness for The Comedians.)	
Laurel Awards	Top General Entertainment		Won	
Laurel Awards	Top Male Dramatic Performance	Paul Scofield	Nominated	
Laurel Awards	Top Female Supporting Performance	Wendy Hiller	Nominated	
Moscow International Film Festival	Grand Prix	Fred Zinnemann	Nominated	
Moscow International Film Festival	Special Mention	Fred Zinnemann	Won	
Moscow International Film Festival	Best Actor	Paul Scofield	Won	
National Board of Review Awards	Best Film		Won	
National Board of Review Awards	Top Ten Films		Won	
National Board of Review Awards	Best Director	Fred Zinnemann	Won	
National Board of Review Awards	Best Actor	Paul Scofield	Won	
National Board of Review Awards	Best Supporting Actor	Robert Shaw	Won	
National Society of Film Critics Awards	Best Film		Runner-up	
National Society of Film Critics Awards	Best Actor	Paul Scofield	4th Place	
New York Film Critics Circle Awards	Best Film		Won	
New York Film Critics Circle Awards	Best Director	Fred Zinnemann	Won	
New York Film Critics Circle Awards	Best Actor	Paul Scofield	Won	
New York Film Critics Circle Awards	Best Screenplay	Robert Bolt	Won	
Writers' Guild of Great Britain Awards	Best British Screenplay	Robert Bolt	Won	

== Historicity ==
Reformation historians and More scholars have pointed out the many inaccuracies in A Man for All Seasons, play and film. Prominent among them was the More biographer Richard Marius. In 1995, Marius pointed out several errors and distortions that he then dismissed as "harmless concessions to theatricality". But he could not "excuse Bolt's idolatry of More's character" and outlined the serious misrepresentations in "the saccharine picture that both play and film present of More's religion and his furious and cascading hatred of Protestants".

"The film provided viewers with the comfortable feeling that they knew all about More. He became a Catholic Abraham Lincoln, an icon of purity and principle who provoked reverence and affection.... Nowhere do we see the historical More who produced hundreds of pages of ugly polemics shrieking for the blood of Protestants. He wanted to destroy heresy by fire.... When heretics were burned, More gloated.... Nowhere in the film is the More who intended that his hatred for heretics be inscribed on his tomb."

Marius summarized that "Bolt gave us a More who would have been scarcely recognizable in his own time and perhaps a scandal to More himself".

== See also ==
- A Man for All Seasons – television film (1988)
- Anne Boleyn in popular culture
- Caesaropapism
- Cultural depictions of Henry VIII
- Trial movies
- BFI Top 100 British films
