= A Man for All Seasons (play) =

Play by Robert Bolt

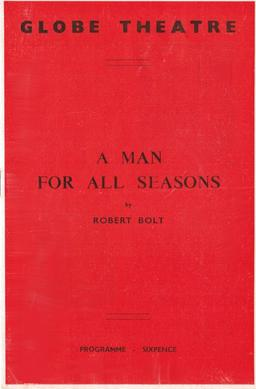
- Programme from the original London production (1960)
- Original language: English
- Written by: Robert Bolt
- Characters: The Common Man; Sir Thomas More; The Duke of Norfolk; Thomas Cromwell; Henry VIII; Margaret More; William Roper; Cardinal Thomas Wolsey; Alice More; Thomas Cranmer; Richard Rich; Signor Chapuys
- Setting: Sixteenth century England

Premiere
- Date: 1 July 1960 (London)
- Place: Globe Theatre

A Man for All Seasons is a play by Robert Bolt based on the life of Sir Thomas More. An early form of the play had been written for BBC Radio in 1954, and a one-hour live television version starring Bernard Hepton was produced in 1957 by the BBC, but after Bolt's success with The Flowering Cherry, he reworked it for the stage.

It was first performed in London opening at the Globe Theatre (now Gielgud Theatre) on 1 July 1960. It later found its way to Broadway, enjoying a critically and commercially successful run of over a year. It has had several revivals, and was subsequently made into a multi-Academy Award-winning 1966 feature film and a 1988 television movie.

The plot is based on the historical events leading up to the execution of More, the 16th-century Lord Chancellor of England, who refused to endorse Henry VIII's wish to divorce his wife Catherine of Aragon, who did not bear him a surviving son, so that he could marry Anne Boleyn.

The play portrays More as a man of principle, envied by rivals such as Thomas Cromwell, but loved by the common people and by his family.

== Title ==
The title reflects 20th-century agnostic playwright Robert Bolt's portrayal of More as the ultimate man of conscience. As one who remains true to himself and his beliefs while adapting to all circumstances and times, despite external pressure or influence, More represents "a man for all seasons". Bolt borrowed the title from Robert Whittington, a contemporary of More's, who in 1520 wrote of him:

More is a man of an angel's wit and singular learning. I know not his fellow. For where is the man of that gentleness, lowliness and affability? And, as time requireth, a man of marvelous mirth and pastimes, and sometime of as sad gravity. A man for all seasons.

== Themes ==
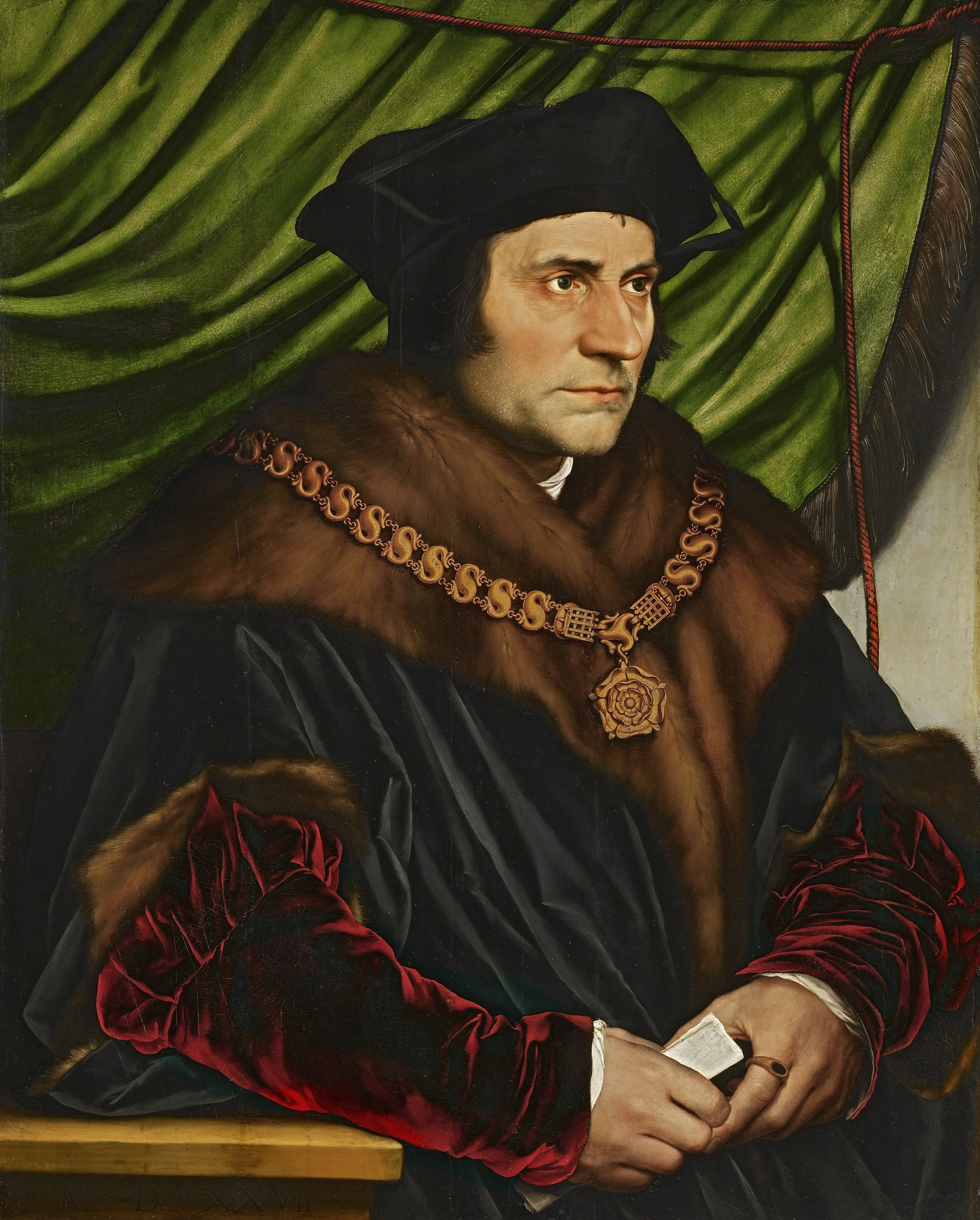
Sir Thomas More, one of the most famous early Lord Chancellors, served and was executed under Henry VIII.

A Man for All Seasons struggles with ideas of identity and conscience. More argues repeatedly that a person is defined by his conscience. His own position is depicted as almost indefensible; even the Pope, who More defends as the rightful head of the Church, is described as a corrupt individual and a puppet of Emperor Charles V. But as More says to the Duke of Norfolk, "What matters is not that it's true, but that I believe it; or no, not that I believe it, but that I believe it." More fears that if he breaks with his conscience, he will be damned to hell; in comparison, his associates and friends are shown to be only concerned with holding onto their own temporal power.

At another key point of the play, More is summoned before an inquiry convened by Cromwell. Norfolk, knowing that Cromwell is fishing for an excuse to have More charged with treason, appeals to their friendship to try and persuade him to sign the Succession to the Crown Act 1534 (pp. 78, Heinemann edition):

Norfolk:

Oh, confound all this. ... I'm not a scholar, as Master Cromwell never tires of pointing out, and frankly, I don't know whether the marriage was lawful or not. But damn it, Thomas, look at those names. ... You know those men! Can't you do what I did, and come with us, for fellowship?

More:

And when we stand before God, and you are sent to Paradise for doing according to your conscience, and I am damned for not doing according to mine, will you come with me – for "fellowship"?

More's persecution is made to seem even more unjust by the inclusion of Eustace Chapuys, the long-time Imperial ambassador to England, in the story. Chapuys recognizes More as a stout man of the church, and in Act II, after More's resignation from the Chancellorship, he informs More of a planned Catholic rebellion along the Scottish border. More chooses to inform Norfolk of the plot, showing him to be patriotic and loyal to the King. This, along with More's refusal to speak out against the King, shows him to be a loyal subject, and thus Cromwell appears to prosecute him not out of any legal obligation, but rather spite and ambition.

Bolt also establishes an anti-authoritarian theme which recurs throughout his works. All people in positions of power – King Henry, Cromwell, Wolsey, Cranmer, Chapuys, even Norfolk – are depicted as being either corrupt, evil, or at best expedient and power-hungry. Bolt's later plays and film screenplays also delve into this theme. The theme of corruption is also illustrated, in Rich's rise to power, the Common Man being drawn into the events of the storyline, and in the (deliberately) anachronistic portrayal of Henry as a younger, athletic man (in 1530 he would have been almost forty and already putting on weight).

Although it is the law that eventually forces More's execution, the play also makes several powerful statements in support of the rule of law. At one point More's future son-in-law, William Roper, urges him to arrest Richard Rich, whose perjury will eventually lead to More's execution. More answers that Rich has broken no law, "And go he should if he were the Devil himself until he broke the law!" Roper is appalled at the idea of granting the Devil the benefit of law, but More is adamant.

"What would you do? Cut a great road through the law to get after the Devil? ... And when the last law was down, and the Devil turned round on you – where would you hide, Roper, the laws all being flat? This country is planted thick with laws from coast to coast, Man's laws, not God's, and if you cut them down – and you're just the man to do it – do you really think you could stand upright in the winds that would blow then? Yes, I give the Devil benefit of law, for my own safety's sake!"

The character of the Common Man serves as a narrator and framing device. A Brechtian character, he plays various small parts – More's servant, a publican, a boatman, More's jailer, jury foreman and executioner – who appear throughout the play, both taking part in and commenting on the action. Several sequences involving this character break the fourth wall – most notably, a sequence where the Common Man attempts to exit the stage and is addressed by Cromwell, who identifies him as a jury foreman. (Indeed, the "jury" consists of sticks or poles with the hats of the Common Man's various characters put on top.) The place of the Common Man in history is emphasized when he says in his opening speech,

"the sixteenth century was the century of the Common Man – like all the other centuries."

Bolt created the Common Man for two main reasons: to illustrate the place and influence of the average person in history, even though they are usually overlooked, and to try to prevent the audience from sympathising with the more titled characters such as More, realising that the audience is more closely related to him – a classic case of Brechtian alienation. The character's role in the story has been interpreted in many different ways by different critics, from being a positive to a negative character. Bolt's own view (expressed in the preface to the play) was that he was intended to draw the audience into the play and that "common" denoted "that which is common to us all." Several of Bolt's subsequent works feature similar characters (e.g. The Thwarting of Baron Bolligrew, State of Revolution).

== Endings ==
Two different endings were written by Bolt. The original ending, performed during the show's preliminary run in England, had Cromwell and Chapuys confront each other after More's execution and then exit the stage, hand in hand, chuckling with "the self-mocking, self-indulgent, rather rueful laughter of the men who know what the world is and how to be comfortable in it". This particular ending is exemplary of Bolt's notion of "riding with the current", forsaking one's conscience in exchange of a life of "convenience".

For the show's London production – and most, if not all, subsequent runs of the show – the Common Man sheds his executioner's garb and addresses the audience one final time:

... It isn't difficult to keep alive, friends – just don't make trouble – or if you must make trouble, make the sort of trouble that's expected... If we should bump into one another, recognize me.

The film version of the play ends with More's execution, followed by a narrator reading off the fates of the various characters involved (originally, this was dialogue spoken by the Common Man prior to the Tower of London Inquiry).

== Cast and characters ==
Notable casts

| Character | West End debut (1961) | Broadway debut (1961) | Broadway revival (2008) |
|---|---|---|---|
| Sir Thomas More | Paul Scofield | Paul Scofield | Frank Langella |
| Richard Rich | John Brown | William Redfield | Jeremy Strong |
| The Common Man | Leo McKern | George Rose | N/A |
| Duke of Norfolk | Alexander Gauge | Albert Dekker | Michael Gill |
| Alice More | Wynne Clark | Carol Goodner | Maryann Plunkett |
| Margaret | Pat Keen | Olga Bellin | Hannah Cabell |
| Cardinal Wolsey | Willoughby Goddard | Jack Creley | Dakin Matthews |
| Thomas Cromwell | Andrew Keir | Leo McKern | Zach Grenier |
| Henry VIII | Richard Leech | Keith Baxter | Patrick Page |
| Archbishop Cranmer | William Roderick | Lester Rawlins | George Morfogen |
| Chapuys | Geoffrey Dunn | David J. Stewart | Triney Sandoval |
| Will Roper | Peter Brandon | John Carson | Michael Esper |
| Attendant | Brian Harrison | John Colenback | Curt Bouril |
| Woman | Beryl Andrews | Sarah Burton | Emily Dorsch |

== Stage productions ==
=== West End premiere ===
The original West End cast, playing at the Globe Theatre (now Gielgud Theatre) and directed by Noel Willman, included Paul Scofield as Sir Thomas More. In London, Man ran simultaneously to another of Bolt's plays, The Tiger and the Horse. Both plays were major hits, although Horse was the more successful of the two. British critical reaction was largely positive, albeit reservedly so; few reviews at the time regarded the play as a classic. The show ran for 320 performances.

=== Broadway premiere ===
In the US, the play was first performed on Broadway on 22 November 1961 at the ANTA Playhouse, again directed by Noel Willman, with Paul Scofield returning to the role of Sir Thomas More. The Broadway production was a huge hit, running for 620 performances. While the play had drawn mixed critical reviews in London, it was almost unanimously praised by the New York critics, who showered it with plaudits and awards. At the 16th Annual Tony Awards, the production earned four nominations, winning in all four categories it was nominated, including Tonys for Bolt, Scofield, and Willman.

Leo McKern played the Common Man in the West End version of the show, but was shifted to the role of Cromwell for the Broadway production – a role he later reprised in the film. While playing Cromwell, he appeared with one brown and one blue eye (McKern of course had lost an eye in an accident and wore a glass one) to accentuate his character's evil nature.

=== 2008 Broadway revival ===
A Broadway revival of the show, produced by the Roundabout Theatre Company, starring Frank Langella as More and directed by Doug Hughes, played at the American Airlines Theatre through December 2008. In this production, the character of The Common Man was deleted by the director (as Bolt had done when adapting his play for the first film version). Jeremy Strong made his Broadway debut in this production as Richard Rich.

=== Other productions ===
Charlton Heston played More in several versions of the play-off-Broadway in the 1970s and 1980s, eventually playing it in the West End. The play was a success and the West End production was taken to Aberdeen, Scotland, for a week where it was staged at His Majesty's Theatre. Heston considered it among his favourite roles. He also directed and starred in a television film version (see below). The production gained a sort of notoriety when Dustin Hoffman spread the story that Heston (who had gone bald in his middle years) was so vain he insisted on wearing a wig over his own hairpiece while playing More to keep it a secret from the audience.

Another famous graduate of the play is Ian McKellen, whose first theatrical role was as Will Roper in a revival production in the late 1960s. He went on to play More in a later run of the show. Faye Dunaway also made her stage debut as a replacement Margaret in the original Broadway run.

An acclaimed Canadian production starring William Hutt and directed by Walter Learning was presented at the Vancouver Playhouse and the Stratford Festival in 1986. At Stratford the production was paired with a production of Shakespeare's Henry VIII, with both plays sharing many actors, and showing two perspectives on historical events. The play was staged at the Brunton Theatre under the direction of Charles Nowosielski in November 1986.

The play was staged in London's West End at the Theatre Royal, Haymarket starring Martin Shaw and produced by Bill Kenwright. It closed on 8 April 2006.

In 2008, Thomas More was also portrayed on stage in Hong Kong as an allegorical symbol of the Pan-democracy camp resisting Chinese Communism when Hardy Tsoi, after translating A Man for All Seasons, mainly into Cantonese, but also with some parts in Mandarin, Spanish, Latin, and English, produced it as a play within a play. Similarities were noted between More and contemporary pro-democracy politicians in Hong Kong such as Martin Lee and Szeto Wah, with the Vatican being seen as representing British colonialism while Henry VIII and his regime were seen as representing Communist China "suppressing democracy and freedom" in Hong Kong. According to Chapman Chen, Hardy Tsoi's version of the play is one of a number of Hong Kong works that suggest that mainstream postcolonial theories which invariably portray European colonialism as oppressive need to be "modified or balanced" to reflect the different experience of places like Hong Kong.

A Man for All Seasons was revived in 2025 for a touring production in England, again starring Martin Shaw as Thomas More, in a cast which included Gary Wilmot, Edward Bennett, Abigail Cruttenden and Nicholas Day, directed by Jonathan Church. The production transferred to the West End, running for a limited season at the Harold Pinter Theatre until 6 September 2025.

== Film and television movies ==
The play was adapted for Australian television in 1964.

=== 1966 film ===
Paul Scofield, who played the leading role in the West End and Broadway stage premieres, played More again in the first of two film versions (1966), winning an Oscar in the process. The film also stars Robert Shaw as Henry VIII, Orson Welles as Wolsey, Corin Redgrave as Will Roper, Nigel Davenport as Norfolk, a young John Hurt as Richard Rich, and an older Wendy Hiller as Lady Alice, More's second wife. It was directed by Fred Zinnemann. In addition to the Best Actor Oscar won by Scofield, the film won Academy Awards for screenplay, cinematography, costume design, Best Director, and Best Picture.

=== 1988 film ===
The 1988 version starred Charlton Heston (who also directed it) as More, Vanessa Redgrave (who appeared briefly and mutely in the 1966 version as Anne Boleyn) as More's wife, and Sir John Gielgud as Cardinal Wolsey. By coincidence, Gielgud's name now graces the former Globe Theatre, where the original play premiered in 1960.

== Radio productions ==
The play was produced, with the following cast, as the Saturday Night Theatre on BBC Home Service on 28 February 1959:

- Sir Thomas More – John Franklyn-Robbins
- Master Richard Rich – Michael Cox
- Master Thomas Cromwell – David Mahlowe
- Cardinal Wolsey – Ralph Hallett
- King Henry VIII – David Scase
- Duke of Norfolk – David Sumner
- Dame Alice More – Cynthia Grenville
- Mistress Margaret (Meg) More – Marah Stohl
- Archbishop Thomas Cranmer – Stephen MacDonald
- The Bishop of Bath – Christopher Benjamin
- The Bishop of Durham – Bernard Kay

The play was produced, with the following cast, as the Saturday Play on BBC Radio 4 on 7 October 2006, as part of its Betrayal season:

- Sir Thomas More – Charles Dance
- Master Richard Rich – Julian Rhind Tutt
- Master Thomas Cromwell – Kenneth Cranham
- Cardinal Wolsey – Timothy Bateson
- King Henry VIII – Brian Cox
- Duke of Norfolk – Nicholas le Prevost
- Master William Roper – Martin Freeman
- Alice More – Kika Markham
- Mistress Margaret (Meg) More – Romola Garai
- Boatman/Steward (aka Matthew) /Jailer – Dan Chyutin
- Archbishop Thomas Cranmer/Headsman – Peter Tate
- Catherine of Aragon – Adjoa Andoh

== Historicity ==
Reformation historians and More scholars have pointed out the many inaccuracies in A Man for All Seasons, play and films. Prominent among them was the More biographer Richard Marius. In 1995, Marius pointed out several errors and distortions that he then dismissed as "harmless concessions to theatricality". But he could not "excuse Bolt's idolatry of More's character" and outlined the serious misrepresentations in "the saccharine picture that both play and film present of More's religion and his furious and cascading hatred of Protestants".

The film provided viewers with the comfortable feeling that they knew all about More. He became a Catholic Abraham Lincoln, an icon of purity and principle who provoked reverence and affection.... Nowhere do we see the historical More who produced hundreds of pages of ugly polemics shrieking for the blood of Protestants. He wanted to destroy heresy by fire.... When heretics were burned, More gloated.... Nowhere in the film is the More who intended that his hatred for heretics be inscribed on his tomb.

Marius summarized that "Bolt gave us a More who would have been scarcely recognizable in his own time and perhaps a scandal to More himself".

== See also ==
- Trial movies
- Cultural depictions of Henry VIII
