= Mary Basset =

English translator

- Born: Mary Roper c. 1523
- Died: 20 March 1572 (aged 49); London, England
- Occupation: Translator
- Spouses: Stephen Clarke; James Basset (died 1558)
- Children: 2
- Parents: William Roper (father); Margaret Roper (mother)
- Relatives: Sir Thomas More (grandfather)

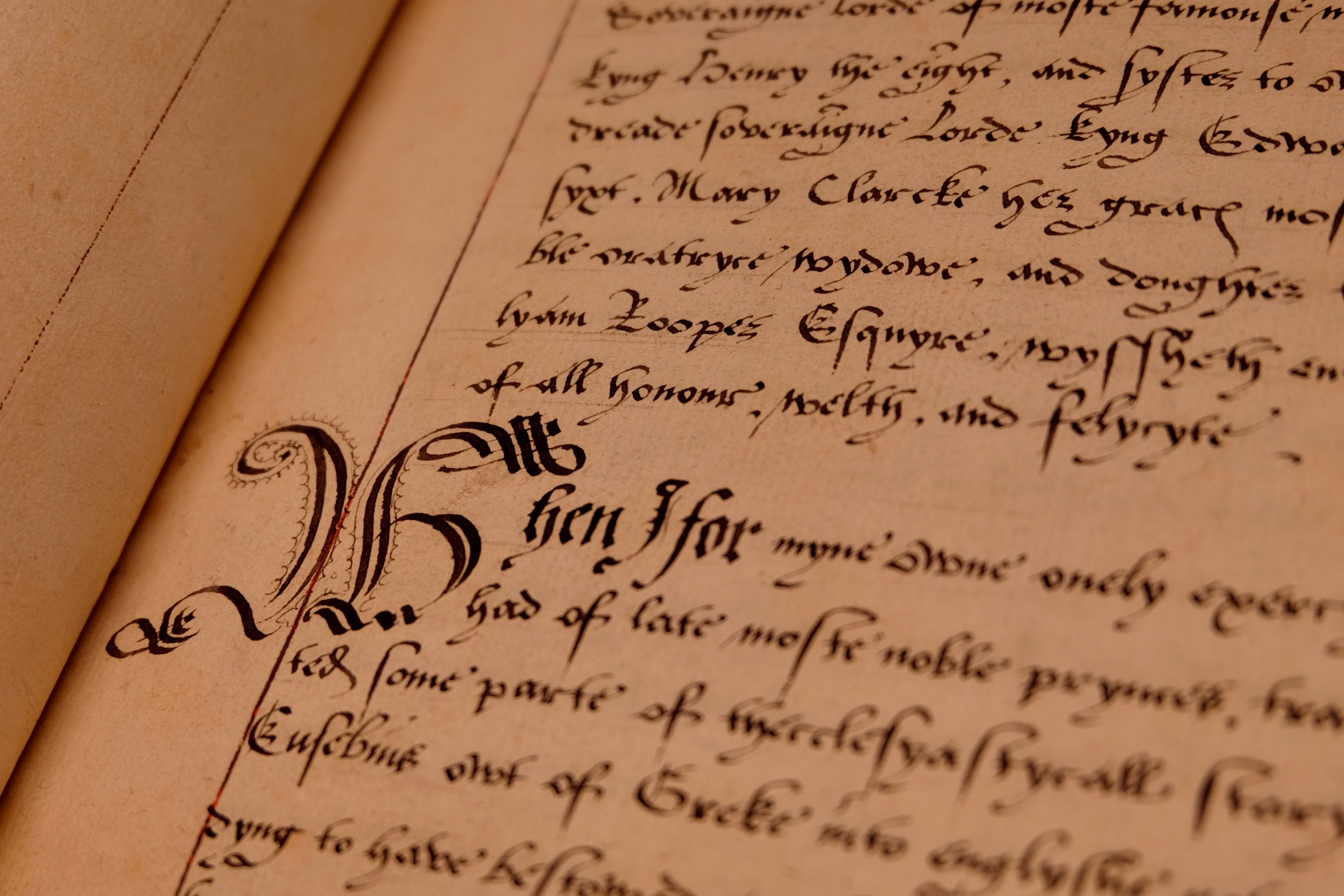
Mary Basset's dedicatory epistle to Mary I in her translation of Eusebius's Ecclesiastical History

Mary Basset (c. 1523 – 20 March 1572; née Roper; also Clarke) was a translator of works into the English language. Basset is cited as the only woman during the reign of Mary I to have her work appear in print.

== Biography ==
As the daughter of Margaret Roper and William Roper and the granddaughter of Sir Thomas More, she had an outstanding education; her tutors included John Christopherson. She married first Stephen Clarke, but no children came of this union; after his death, she married James Basset, by June 1556.

Between 1544 and 1553, Mary produced the first English translation of the Ecclesiastical History by Eusebius, now surviving in a single manuscript in the British Library, Harley MS 1860, along with her translation of its first book into Latin. Her work is based on the edition published by Robert Estienne in 1544; her learnedness is reflected in her comments on the text's inaccuracies. In 1560 Mary also translated More's De tristitia Christi into English. Nicholas Harpsfield wrote that she had also translated the History of Socrates, Theodoretus, Sozomenus, and Evagrius, but no copies of these are known. Her translations are characterized by the same engagement in contemporary political and ideological debates as can be seen in More and Margaret Roper.

Mary's will of 1566 is strongly Roman Catholic, and mentions several objects that had belonged to More. She died at London on 20 March 1572, not yet 50.
