= Alice More =

Second wife of Sir Thomas More

Alice, Lady More
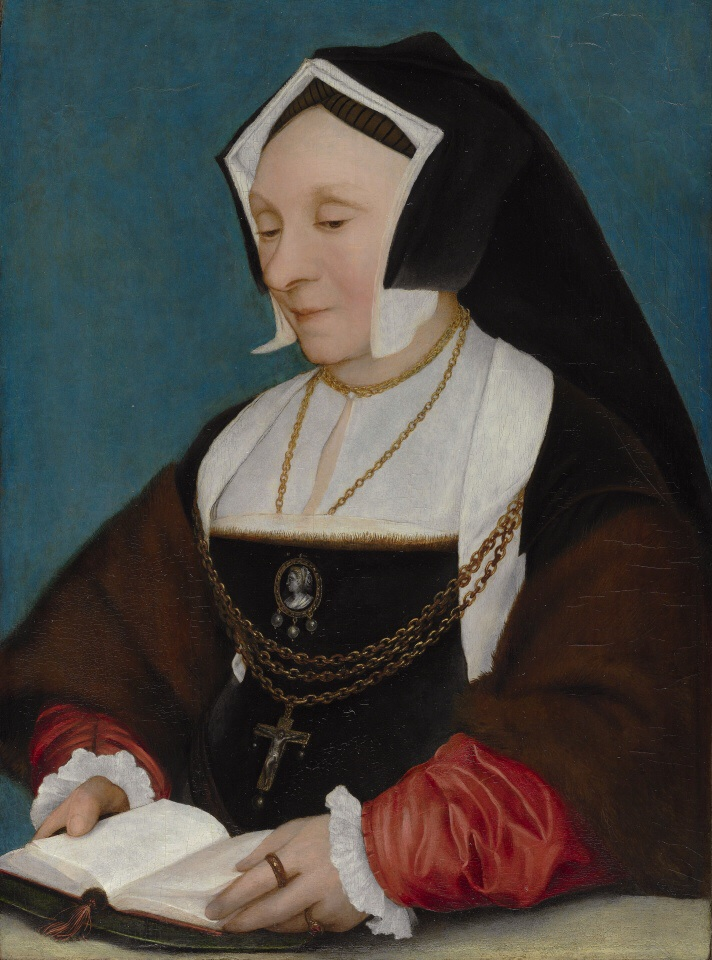
- Portrait of Alice More by Hans Holbein
- Born: 1474; England
- Died: 1546 or 1551; England
- Spouse(s): John Middleton; Thomas More
- Children: 3; only 1 survived infancy (Alice)

Alice, Lady More (née Harpur; 1474–1546 or 1551), also known as Dame Alice Moore, was the second wife of Thomas More, who served as Lord Chancellor of England. She is a prominent figure in Tudor history and literature.

== Biography ==
She was the daughter of Elizabeth (née Adern) and Sir Richard Harpur. Elizabeth was the daughter of Sir Peter Adern and his wife Catherine.

Her first husband was John Middleton, a merchant, with whom she had a son and two daughters, only one of whom, her daughter also named Alice (1501–1563), survived infancy. John Middleton died in 1509, leaving her a young widow. After her marriage to Thomas More in 1511, he raised her daughter Alice as his own. They did not have children together.

Historians have concluded that Sir Thomas More married Alice so he could have a step-mother for his four children after his first wife, Jane, died in 1511. One of her step-daughters was Margaret More. Alice was also considered wealthy, as her first husband left her all of his estate, and her family owned property. Historians also believe that Thomas More had known Alice and her family long before they were married, which is why the couple married without hesitation within weeks of Jane's death. Alice was seven years older than Sir Thomas. The family lived in London and later at the estate built in Chelsea. She was known for her love of animals, especially her dogs, and her pet monkey.

She was married to Sir Thomas from 1511 until he was executed in 1535 after he was convicted of treason for refusing to take the Oath of Supremacy. Before his execution, while he was locked in the Tower of London, she was in charge of taking care of his affairs. The last years of her life were poor, due to the family's property being confiscated. The Crown voided the trust her husband had belatedly established for her. Henry VIII of England instead allowed her a smaller annuity of £20 in 1537, to live on after his death. Her death date is most often referred to as April 1551, but some sources state 1546. Her daughter Alice bore several children, giving her many blood descendants.

Her husband was canonized by Pope Pius XI in 1935 as a martyr of the schism that separated the Church of England from Rome.

== In popular culture ==
Alice is a major role in the stage play A Man for All Seasons by Robert Bolt. The play has been performed on Broadway on two occasions. She was first played by Carol Goodner and then by Maryann Plunkett.

The play was turned into a film in 1966, in which Alice was portrayed by Dame Wendy Hiller. Hiller was nominated for the Academy Award for Best Supporting Actress for her performance. The film also won the Academy Award for Best Picture of the Year.

The play was later filmed for television in 1988, starring Vanessa Redgrave as Alice. Redgrave was nominated for a Golden Globe award for her performance.

In the Showtime series The Tudors, More was portrayed by Catherine Byrne from 2007-2008.

She also appears in the 2015 BBC series Wolf Hall and is played by Monica Dolan.
