= William Roper =

English lawyer and member of Parliament

The Right Honourable Sir William Roper
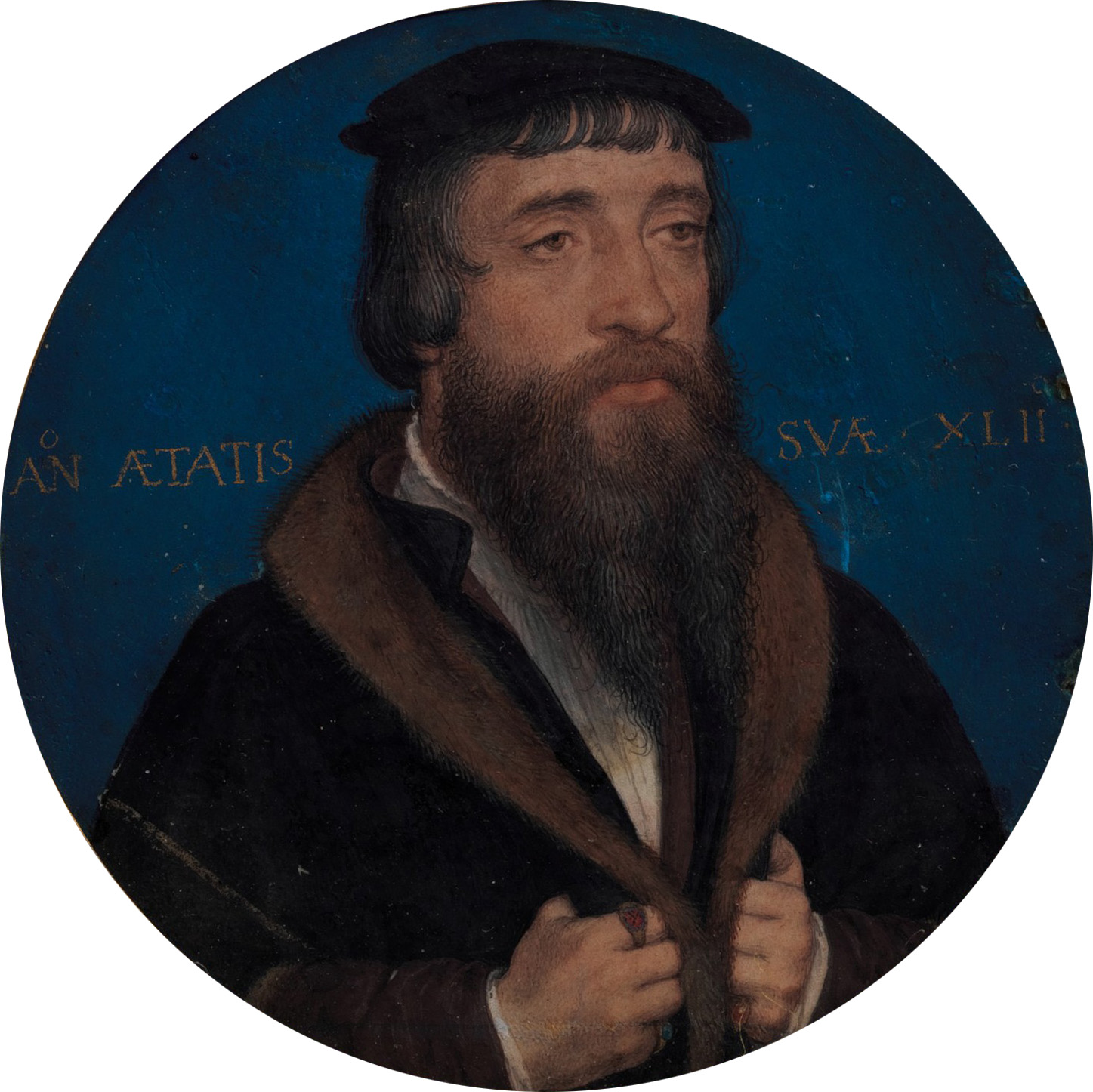

High Sheriff of Kent
- In office 1554–1555
- Monarch: Mary I
- Preceded by: Robert Southwell
- Succeeded by: Sir Thomas Kempe

Personal details
- Born: c. 1496
- Died: 4 January 1578 (aged 81-82)
- Spouse: Margaret More (m. 1521)
- Children: Elizabeth; Margaret; Thomas; Mary; Anthony
- Education: Lincoln's Inn

William Roper (c. 1496 – 4 January 1578) was an English lawyer and member of Parliament. The son of a Kentish gentleman, he married Margaret, daughter of Sir Thomas More. He wrote a highly regarded biography of his father-in-law.

== Life ==
William Roper the second was the eldest son of John Roper (d. 1524), Attorney-General to Henry VIII, and his wife Jane (died c.1544), daughter and coheir of Sir John Fyneux, Chief Justice of King's Bench. The Ropers were an ancient Kentish family, owners of the manor of St Dunstan outside the West Gate of Canterbury, since known as the Roper Gate. He was educated at one of the English universities and then studied law at Lincoln's Inn, being called to the bar in 1525. He was appointed Clerk of the Pleas in the Court of King's Bench, a post previously held by his father, holding the post until shortly before his death. Aged about twenty-three it is thought he joined the household of Sir Thomas More, marrying Margaret, More's eldest daughter, in 1521. They lived together in Well Hall in Eltham, Kent.

Erasmus, who knew More and his family well, described Roper as a young man "who is wealthy, of excellent and modest character and not unacquainted with literature". Roper became a convert to the Lutheran doctrine of Justification by Faith and spoke so freely of his belief that he was summoned to appear before Cardinal Wolsey on an accusation of heresy. More often disputed with Roper over his belief. He said to his daughter,

Meg, I have borne a long time with thy husband; I have reasoned and argued with him in these points of religion, and still given to him my poor fatherly counsel, but I perceive none of all this able to call him home; and therefore, Meg, I will no longer dispute with him, but will clean give him over and get me to God and pray for him.

To these prayers by More, Roper attributed his return to Catholicism.

Roper and his wife took in Margaret Throckmorton. She would become the prioress of St Monica in Leuven.

He was a member of various Parliaments (as MP for several constituencies including Rochester and Canterbury) between 1529 and 1558 and appointed High Sheriff of Kent for 1554–55. Although he remained a Roman Catholic, he was permitted to retain his office of prothonotary of the Court of King's Bench after the accession of Elizabeth I. However, his diatribe against Elizabeth's late mother, Anne Boleyn, in his biography of More earned him the enmity of many Elizabethan loyalists and Protestants.

His biography of Sir Thomas More was written during the reign of Mary I nearly twenty years after More's death, but was not printed until 1626, when it became a primary source for More's earliest biographers because of Roper's intimate knowledge of his father-in-law.

== In popular culture ==
Roper is an important character in Robert Bolt's play A Man for All Seasons, portrayed as a contrarian who changes his views after arguing with More in order to marry his daughter. (In fact he had married Margaret More some years before the events depicted in the play and film.) After arguing theology with Roper, More says, "They're a cantankerous lot, the Ropers, always swimming against the stream. Old Roper was the same."

In the 1966 film adaptation, Roper was portrayed by Corin Redgrave.
