= The Tiger and the Horse =

The Tiger and the Horse is a three-act play by Robert Bolt, written in 1960. Based on Bolt's own position as a member of the Committee of 100, a British anti-nuclear group, it deals with a university professor faced with choosing to sign a petition to ban nuclear weapons or a chance at vice chancellorship.

It takes its title from William Blake's The Marriage of Heaven and Hell: "The tigers of wrath are wiser than the horses of instruction."

The play's original run coincided with Bolt's A Man for All Seasons in 1960. It was more financially successful than Man, although it received mixed critical reviews. Its original cast featured Michael Redgrave as Dean, daughter Vanessa, in one of her first major stage roles, as Stella, and Alan Dobie as Louis.

== Plot ==
Jack Dean, a professor of astronomy at a prestigious English university, is the primary candidate for the vice chancellorship after the current vice chancellor, Hugo Slate, retires the position. Dean has a wife, Gwendolyn, and two daughters, Stella and Mary. Louis Flax, a strong-willed, opinionated research fellow who is courting Stella, introduces a petition to ban nuclear weapons. However, Dean refuses to sign it, even though his wife strongly supports the petition. His unwillingness to commit himself slowly drives his wife insane; she feels herself unloved and unappreciated by her husband, but blames herself for it. Meanwhile, Stella becomes pregnant by Louis, and she tries to convince Louis to marry her. Reaching her breaking point, Gwendolyn destroys a Holbein portrait of the university's founders and pins the petition to it. This convinces Dean to support his wife and sign the petition, even though it will ruin his chances of becoming vice chancellor.
