= Margaret Ann Moore =

Canadian-American executive coach (born 1957)

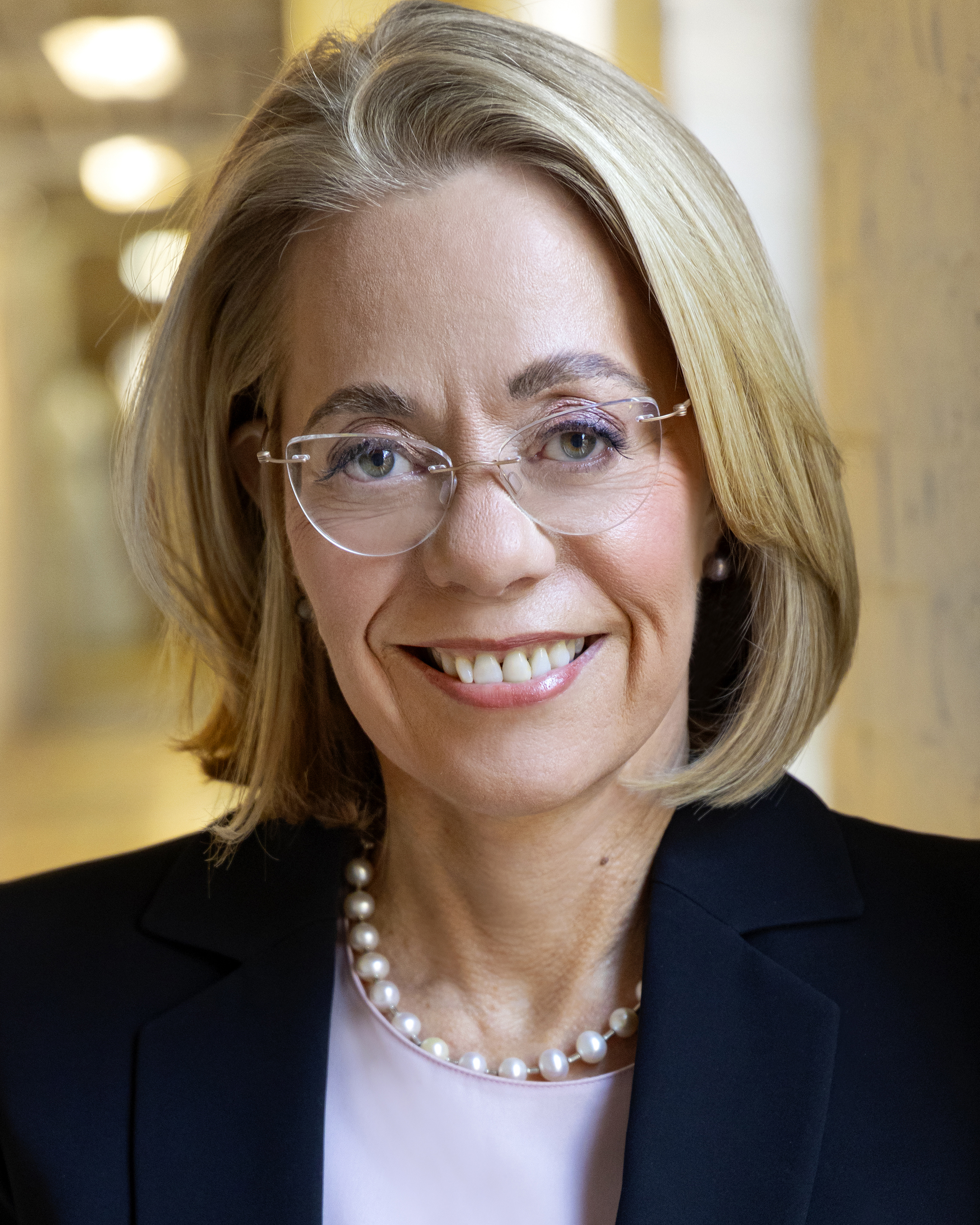
- Born: December 24, 1957 (age 68); Toronto, Canada
- Education: Master of Business Administration, Ivery School of Business, University of Western Ontario; BSc, University of Western Ontario
- Occupations: Author; chief executive officer; Coach
- Website: coachmeg.com

Margaret Moore (born December 24, 1957) is a Canadian-American author, entrepreneur and executive coach. Following 17 years as a biotechnology executive in the UK, Canada, France and the US, she has co-founded three coaching organizations – Wellcoaches Corporation (2000), Institute of Coaching at McLean Hospital (2009) and the National Board for Health and Wellness Coaching (2010). She also serves as the co-director of the annual Coaching in Leadership & Healthcare conference provided delivered by the Institute of Coaching, McLean Hospital and Harvard Medical School. In 2025, Margaret was awarded the prestigious Thinkers50 award.

== Early life and education ==
Moore was born on a dairy farm near Toronto, she attended a two-room elementary school and learned to drive a tractor. Her maternal grandparents were Russian German Mennonites based in Ukraine who emigrated to Canada to escape the 1917 Bolshevik Revolution.

In 1978, she graduated from the University of Western Ontario (now Western University) in Biology and completed an MBA in 1983. She initiated her 17-year biotech career in the UK following an MBA term at the London Business School, supported by an international scholarship.

Moore is an executive coach, mainly in the healthcare and biotechnology domains. She is the founder and CEO of Wellcoaches Corporation, a co-founder and former chair of the Institute of Coaching at McLean Hospital. She was co-director of the Coaching in Leadership & Healthcare conference delivered by the Institute of Coaching, McLean, and Harvard Medical School from 2008 to 2024. From 2015 to 2018 she played a role in establishing a strategic partnership with the National Board of Medical Examiners to institute national standards and certification for health and wellness coaching and laid the foundation for the role of the coach in healthcare.

== Books ==
Moore co-authored the Coaching Psychology Manual published by Wolters Kluwer in 2009 and 2015.

She is a co-author of two Harvard Health books: "Organize Your Mind, Organize Your Life" released by Harlequin in 2012, relaunched by HarperCollins as Train Your Brain in 2020 and "Organize Your Emotions, Optimize Your Life" published by William Morrow in 2016.

She is a co-editor and coaching theory chapter author of the American Medical Association book published by Elsevier titled: Coaching in Medical Education in 2022.

She is a co-author of a 2025 Berrett Koehler book titled "The Science of Good Leadership: Nine ways to expand your impact.

== Selected publications ==
- Institute of Coaching report: Leading with Humanity: The Future of Leadership and Coaching.
- Health and Well-Being Coaching Adjuvant to GLP-1 Induced Weight Loss. American Journal of Lifestyle Medicine. 2024.
- Harenberg S, Sforzo G, Hunter R, Jackson E, Moore M. The Well-Being Coaching Inventory (WCI): Questionnaire Development and Validation. American Journal of Lifestyle Medicine. 2025;0(0). doi:10.1177/15598276251320573
- Abu Dabrh, Abd Moain, Kavitha Reddy, Bettina M. Beech, and Margaret Moore. "Health & Wellness Coaching Services: Making the Case for Reimbursement." American Journal of Lifestyle Medicine (2024): 15598276241266784.
- Passarelli, Angela M., Gail Gazelle, Leslie E. Schwab, Robert F. Kramer, Margaret A. Moore, Raja G. Subhiyah, Nicole M. Deiorio et al. "Competencies for those who coach physicians: a modified Delphi study." In Mayo Clinic Proceedings, vol. 99, no. 5, pp. 782–794. Elsevier, 2024.
- Moore, Margaret (July 2013). "Coaching the Multiplicity of Mind: A Strengths-based Model". Global Advances in Health and Medicine. 2 (4): 78–84. doi:10.7453/gahmj.2013.030. PMC 3833551. PMID 24416685.
- Moore, Margaret; Lacagnina, Salvatore; Mitchell, Sarah (November 2018). "The Lifestyle Medicine Team: Health Care That Delivers Value". American Journal of Lifestyle Medicine. 12 (6): 479–483. doi:10.1177/1559827618792493. PMC 6367871. PMID 30783402.
- Moore, Margaret (September 2023). "Ground Zero in Lifestyle Medicine: Changing Mindsets to Change Behavior". American Journal of Lifestyle Medicine. 17 (5): 632–638. doi:10.1177/15598276231166320. PMC 10498987. PMID 37711351.
- Moore, Margaret; Kaye, Miranda P.; Faber, Aubrey; Sforzo, Gary A. (May 2023). "Dosing of Health and Wellness Coaching for Obesity and Type 2 Diabetes: Research Synthesis to Derive Recommendations". American Journal of Lifestyle Medicine. 17 (3): 374–385. doi:10.1177/15598276211073078. PMC 10248368. PMID 37304739.
- Moore, Margaret; Wolever, Ruth Q.; Manning, Linda; Elam, Roy; Armstrong, Colin; Frates, Elizabeth Pegg; Duskey, Heidi; Anderson, Chelsea; Curtis, Rebecca L.; Masemer, Susan; Lawson, Karen (May 2013). "Group Health Coaching: Strengths, Challenges, and Next Steps". Global Advances in Health and Medicine. 2 (3): 95–102. doi:10.7453/gahmj.2013.019. PMC 3833535. PMID 24416678.
