= Polhill =

Polhill may refer to:

== People with the family name ==
- David Polhill (1674–1754), British politician, MP for Rochester, Bramber and Kent.
- Nathaniel Polhill (1723–1782), British politician.
- Frederick Polhill-Turner (1826–1981), British politician, also known as Frederick Polhill. Father of Cecil and Arthur.
- Cecil Polhill (1860–1938), English missionary.
- Arthur T. Polhill (1862-1935), English missionary.
- Robert Polhill Bevan (1865–1925), British painter, draughtsman and lithographer.
- Tony Polhill (born 1947), New Zealand middle-distance runner.

== Places ==
- Polhill, a place between Badgers Mount and Sevenoaks in Kent, England (location of Polhill Anglo-Saxon cemetery and Polhill Bank nature reserve)
- Pollhill, a hamlet near Harrietsham in Kent, England
  - Polhill Mill, watermill near Pollhill hamlet
