= Margaret Roper =

English writer and translator (1505–1544)

Margaret Roper, Lady Roper
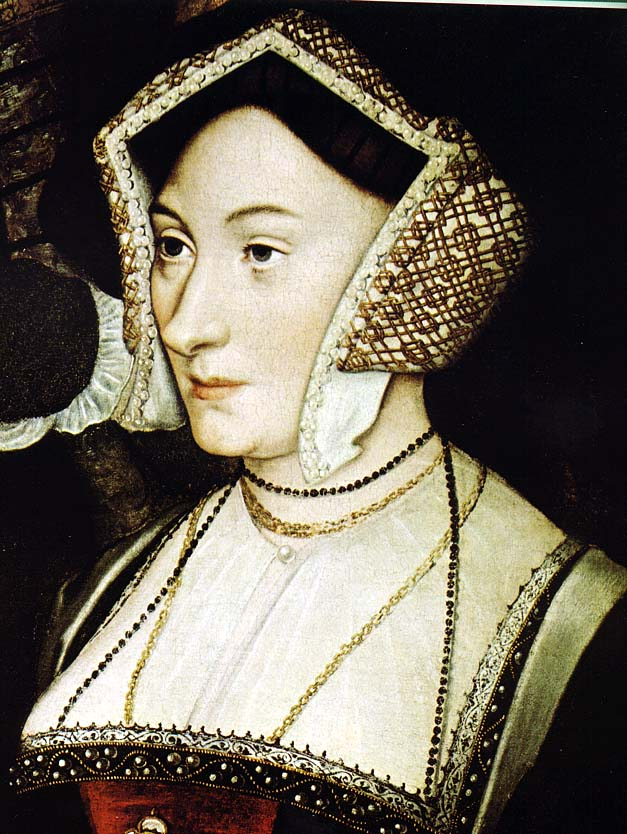
- Portrait of Margaret Roper, from a 1593 reproduction of a now-lost Hans Holbein portrait of all the women of Thomas More's family.
- Born: Margaret More; 1505; Bucklersbury, London, England
- Died: 1544 (aged 38–39); Chelsea, London, England
- Resting place: St. Dunstan's, Canterbury
- Spouse: William Roper (m. 1521)
- Children: Elizabeth; Margaret; Thomas; Mary; Anthony
- Parent(s): Thomas More (father); Joanna Colt (mother)
- Relatives: Elizabeth Dauncey (sister); Cecily Heron (sister)

Margaret Roper (née More; 1505–1544) was an English writer and translator. Roper, the eldest daughter of Sir Thomas More, is considered to have been one of the most learned women in sixteenth-century England. She is celebrated for her filial piety and scholarly accomplishments. Roper's most known publication is a Latin-to-English translation of Erasmus' Precatio Dominica as A Devout Treatise upon the Paternoster. In addition, she wrote many Latin epistles and English letters, as well as an original treatise entitled The Four Last Things. She also translated the Ecclesiastical History of Eusebius from the Greek into the Latin language.

== Early life ==
Margaret More was the eldest child of Sir Thomas More and Joanna "Jane" Colt. Colt was the daughter of an Essex gentleman and died of unknown causes in 1511. Margaret was most likely baptised at St. Stephen's Church, across the street from the Mores' family home. Besides Margaret, Joanna had four other children: Elizabeth, Cecily, John and, soon after Margaret's birth, the More family adopted Margaret Giggs, the daughter of a recently deceased neighbour.

After the death of Colt, More married Alice Middleton, a widow. More's marriage to Middleton provided a step-sister named Alice (after her mother) for Margaret and her siblings. The senior Alice Middleton bore no children with More. Margaret spent most of her childhood at the Old Barge (originally there had been a wharf nearby serving the Walbrook river) on Bucklersbury, St Stephen Walbrook parish, London. In 1524, the Ropers and Mores moved to Butts Close, a home in Chelsea, Middlesex. It was a large and commodious mansion opposite the Thames, built by Sir Thomas More on the site subsequently occupied by Beaufort House. There, Erasmus, a close friend of More, passed many happy days, and Hans Holbein the Younger painted some of his finest pictures.

Margaret gave early indications of extraordinary intellectual abilities, deep devotion to God, and is cited as having "the most amiable and affectionate disposition". She and her siblings were educated in the humanist tradition by More as well as their tutor William Gunnell, ancestor of Henry (Robert) Gunnell (1724-1794) of the House of Commons. She was proficient in Greek and Latin, prose and verse, philosophy and history, and had a thorough knowledge of music, arithmetic, and some other sciences. In his letters, More makes clear his desire to educate his daughters as much as his sons. In his children's studies, More emphasised translations as the best way to teach language, thus facilitating Margaret's experience and later work with translations. More advocated the education of girls, but within certain limits: any work they completed should remain within the private sphere.

== Personal life ==
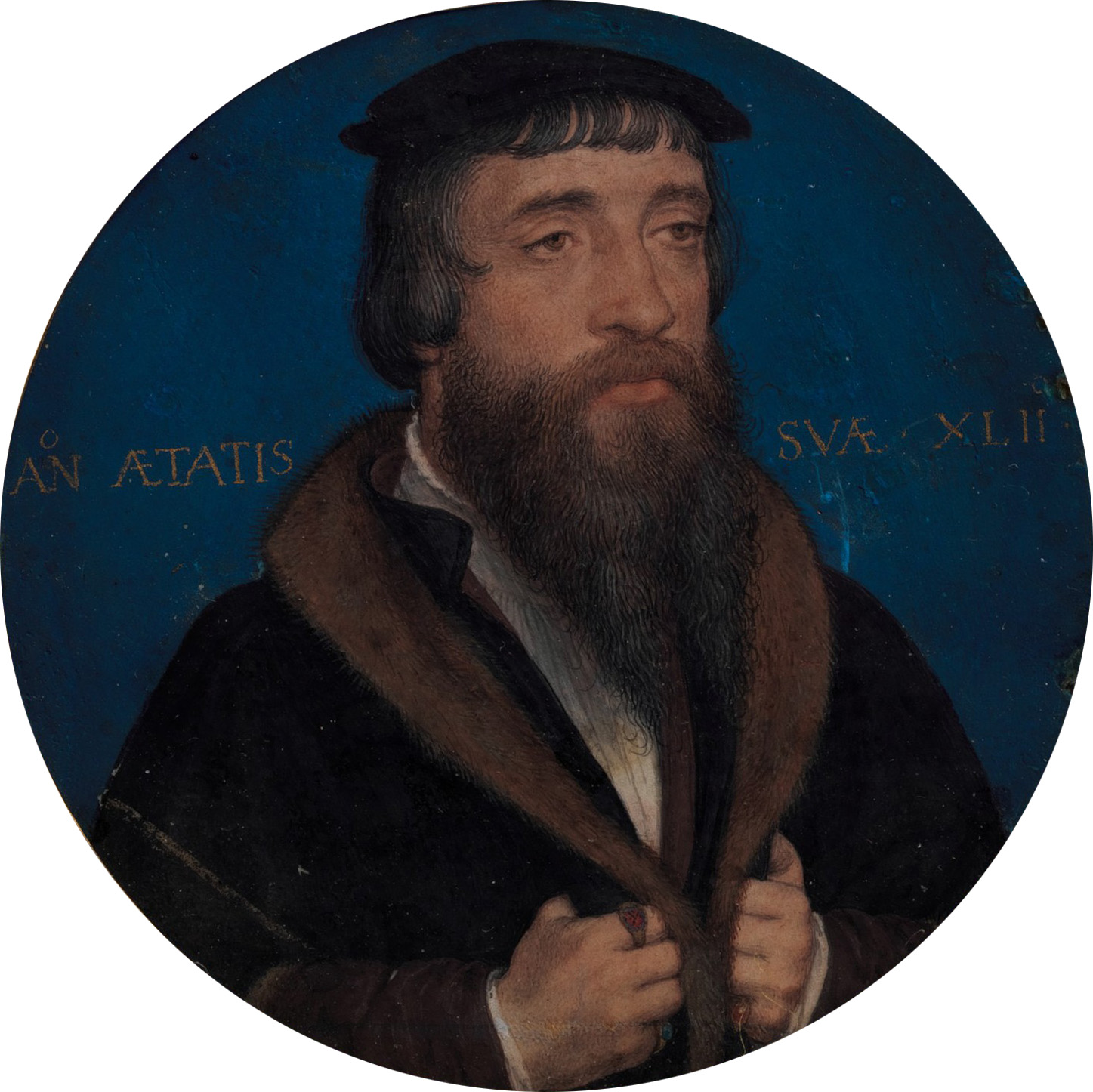
Sir William Roper

Margaret married William Roper in 1521 in Eltham, Kent, and they made their home at Well Hall in Eltham. She, like the rest of her family, was a determined adherent to the tenets of the Roman Catholic Church; having married William, a Lutheran, she is said to have converted him back to the religion of his fathers. William was the son of John Roper, Esq. prothonotary of the King's Bench, and possessor of an estate at Eltham in Kent. Margaret and her husband had five children: Elizabeth (1523–60), Margaret (1526–88), Thomas (1533–98), Mary (d. 1572), and Anthony (1544–1597). Roper's third daughter, Mary, is also known for her translation work. William Roper ("son Roper," as he is referred to by Thomas More) produced the first biography of the statesman, but his homage to his father-in-law is not remembered as well as his wife's efforts. William Roper's biography of More is given weight owing to his role as a witness in Henry VIII and More's famous disagreement.

== Career ==
Roper was the first non-royal woman to be noted for the publication of a translation. This was her translation of the Latin work, Precatio Dominica by Erasmus, as A Devout Treatise upon the Paternoster. Erasmus was sufficiently impressed with her skills to dedicate his Commentary on the Christian hymn of Prudentius (1523) to her. Erasmus is cited as writing most of his work, The Praise of Folly, during a visit to Bucklersbury. The dedication to The Praise of Folly cites Thomas More and his friendship with Erasmus heavily. In 1524, Roper also completed a translation of Erasmus's thoughts on the Lord's Prayer.

In a letter, Roper mentions her poems, but none are extant. Lost work of Roper's also include her Latin and Greek verses, Latin speeches, her imitation of Quintilian, and her treatise, The Four Laste Thynges.

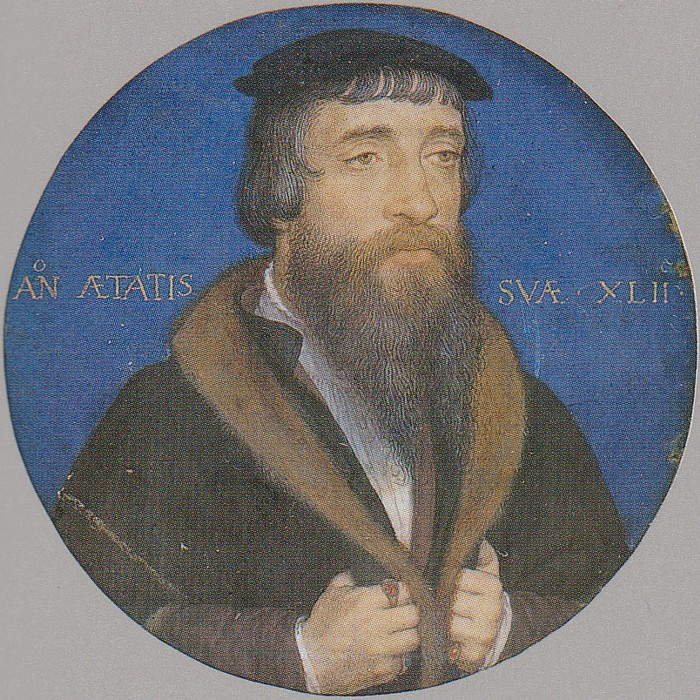

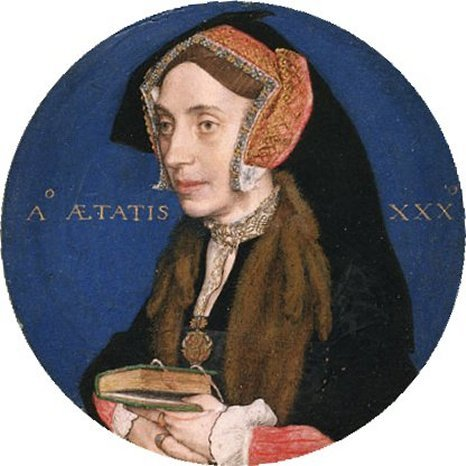
Miniatures of William and Margaret Roper by Hans Holbein the Younger

== Significance of work ==
Roper's translations can be seen as a contribution to a contemporary debate between the Catholics and the Protestants. Jaime Goodrich, author of Faithful Translators: Authorship, Gender, and Religion in Early Modern England, explores this relationship with Roper's translation work. In the midst of the discourse on Erasmus over whether he supported or refuted the spread of Lutheranism, Roper's translation of Erasmus's A Devout Treatise upon the Paternoster was viewed with scrutiny and used as evidence that English authorities supported Erasmus.

== Relationship with Thomas More ==
Margaret Roper's relationship with her father, Thomas More, is renowned and often cited as an examplar of familial loyalty. More often referred to her as "My dearest Meg".

Margaret visited More often during his imprisonment in the Tower of London. Thomas Cromwell allowed the visits in the hope that she would persuade More to accept the Acts of Supremacy to avoid execution. During her visits, she smuggled letters and other things to and from More. Margaret is credited with putting together a dossier of the letters written by More during his time in the tower.

Thomas More was beheaded in 1535 for his refusal to accept the Acts of Supremacy and the Act of Succession (1534) of Henry VIII of England and swear allegiance to Henry as head of the English Church. Afterwards, More's head was displayed on a pike at London Bridge for a month. Margaret Roper bribed the man whose business it was to throw the head into the river to give it to her instead. She preserved it by pickling it in spices until her own death at the age of 39 in 1544. After her death, William Roper took charge of the head, and it is buried with him.

More and his relatives were branded traitors following his execution. Margaret Roper took steps to clear her father's name posthumously by hiring More's old secretary John Harris, to collect and recreate his writings to prove that there was no evidence of treason found within them.

== Death ==
Margaret Roper died in 1544 and was buried in Chelsea Parish Church. William Roper, who survived her by thirty-three years, took charge of Thomas More's head. He never remarried, and honoured his wife's memory by living a life devoted to learning, beneficence, and piety. Following her husband's death, Margaret was reinterred in the vault belonging to the Roper family, in St. Dunstan's, Canterbury.

== In popular culture ==
In Alfred, Lord Tennyson's Dream of Fair Women, he invokes Margaret Roper ("who clasped in her last trance / Her murdered father's head") as a paragon of loyalty and familial love.

In Robert Bolt's famous play A Man for All Seasons, Margaret and William Roper were major characters. Bolt characterises Roper as a brilliant and strong unmarried woman in her twenties. In the 1966 film, she was portrayed by Susannah York. In the original Broadway play, she was portrayed by Olga Bellin, and later in the play's run by Faye Dunaway, in her Broadway debut.

In the 2007 TV show The Tudors which focuses on the reign of Henry VIII, Margaret Roper is portrayed by actress Gemma Reeves. The show focuses some on More's conflict with Henry VIII.

In the 2015 miniseries Wolf Hall, she is portrayed by Emma Hiddleston as working with her father on translations and assisting him with his correspondence, and participating along with More in dangerous, but expertly guarded verbal exchanges with Thomas Cromwell.
