= Robert Bolt =

English playwright (1924–1995)

Robert Bolt CBE
- Born: 15 August 1924; Sale, Cheshire, England
- Died: 20 February 1995 (aged 70); Chichester, Sussex, England
- Education: Manchester Grammar School; University of Manchester; University of Exeter
- Spouses: Celia Ann "Jo" Roberts (m. 1948; div. 1963) Sarah Miles (m. 1967; div. 1976) (m. 1988) Ann Queensberry (m. 1980; div. 1985)
- Children: 4
- Writing career
- Notable works: Screenplays; Lawrence of Arabia (1962); Doctor Zhivago (1965); A Man for All Seasons (1966); Ryan's Daughter (1970); The Mission (1986); Plays; A Man for All Seasons (1960); Vivat! Vivat Regina! (1971)

Robert Oxton Bolt (15 August 1924 – 20 February 1995) was an English playwright and a screenwriter, known for writing the screenplays for Lawrence of Arabia, Doctor Zhivago, and A Man for All Seasons, the latter two of which won him the Academy Award for Best Adapted Screenplay. He also was the recipient of a Tony Award, two BAFTA Awards, and three Golden Globe Awards, in addition to nominations for a Primetime Emmy Award and a Laurence Olivier Award.

== Career ==
He was born in Sale, Cheshire, to Methodist parents; his father owned a small furniture shop. At Manchester Grammar School his affinity for Sir Thomas More first developed. After leaving school aged sixteen, he worked in an insurance office, which he disliked; after studying in the evening for five weeks he passed three A-levels and went on to attend the University of Manchester, from which, after a year, he undertook wartime service, initially as a pilot officer candidate in the RAF (air-sickness preventing him from continuing past training) from 1943 to 1946. He then served as an Army officer in West Africa until 1947, when he returned to the University of Manchester and spent three years completing his honours degree in history. Following this, he took a teaching diploma from the University of Exeter. For many years he taught in the English and History departments at Millfield School and only became a full-time writer at the age of 33 when his play The Flowering Cherry was staged in London in 1958, with Celia Johnson and Ralph Richardson.

He first earned notice for his original play A Man for All Seasons – a depiction of Sir Thomas More's clash with King Henry VIII over his divorce from Catherine of Aragon – which won awards on the stage and in its film version, though subsequently most of his writing was screenplays for films or television.

Bolt's writing included primarily dramatic works that placed their protagonists in tension with the prevailing society. He won praise for A Man for All Seasons, his first iteration of this theme, but he developed it in his existential script for Lawrence of Arabia (1962). In Lawrence, he succeeded where several before him had failed at turning T. E. Lawrence's Seven Pillars of Wisdom into a cogent screenplay by transforming the entire book into a search for the identity of its author, presenting Lawrence as a misfit both in English and Arab society.

It was at this time that Bolt himself fell foul of the law, and as part of the Committee of 100 he was arrested and imprisoned for protesting against nuclear proliferation. He refused to be "bound over" (i.e., to sign a declaration that he would not engage in such activities again) and was sentenced to one month in prison because of this. Sam Spiegel, the producer of Lawrence, persuaded Bolt to sign after he had served only two weeks. Bolt later regretted his actions and did not speak to Spiegel again after the film was completed.

Later in Doctor Zhivago, Bolt invested Boris Pasternak's novel with his own characteristic sense of narrative and dialogue – human, short and telling. The Bounty was Bolt's first project after a stroke, which resulted in some loss of speech and partial paralysis. In it, Fletcher Christian takes the "Lawrence" role of a man in tension with his society who in the process loses touch with his own identity. The Mission was Bolt's final film project, and it once again represented his thematic preoccupations, this time with 18th-century Jesuits in South America.

Bolt's final produced script was Political Animal, later made into the TV movie Without Warning: The James Brady Story (1991), about the attempted assassination of Ronald Reagan and the struggles of his press secretary James Brady to recover from a near-fatal gunshot injury he received in the process. Bolt was initially reluctant to make the film, but after meeting Brady he felt he could relate to Brady's struggles with a head injury, and many of his own experiences recovering from his stroke found their way into the script.

== Personal life ==
Bolt was married four times, twice to British actress Sarah Miles. His first wife was Celia Ann "Jo" Roberts, by whom he had three children: Sally (died 1982), Ben, and Joanna. They divorced in 1963. He was married to Miles from 1967 until 1976; Bolt had his fourth child, Thomas, with Miles. In the early 1980s, he had a third marriage, to the actress Ann Queensberry (former wife of David Douglas, 12th Marquess of Queensberry), before remarrying Sarah Miles in 1988, with whom he remained until his death in 1995.

Bolt was a member of the Communist Party of Great Britain from 1942-1947. He opposed the Soviet invasion of Czechoslovakia.

== Death ==
Bolt suffered a heart attack and a stroke that left him paralysed in 1979. He died aged 70 in 1995, in Petersfield, Hampshire, England, following a long illness.

== Honours ==
Bolt was appointed a Commander of the Order of the British Empire (CBE) in the 1972 Queen's Birthday Honours List for his services to drama.

== Works ==
=== Plays ===
Bolt wrote several plays for BBC Radio in the 1950s, as well as several unproduced plays. Many of his early radio plays were for children, with few adapted for the stage.

- The Last of the Wine (1955) – A play showcasing the reactions of ordinary Englishmen to the advent of nuclear armageddon, one of Bolt's pet political issues. One of Bolt's radio plays which Bolt tried to adapt to the stage. However, the play was either never performed or performed a few times and then cancelled. Wine has never been published or performed since. First broadcast late March or early April 1955 on the BBC Third Programme.
- Flowering Cherry (1958) – concerns a middle-aged man, an insurance salesman dissatisfied with his life who retreats into his fantasies of owning a cherry orchard. His erratic behaviour alienates family and friends and threatens his financial ruin. Ran on the West End starring Ralph Richardson and Celia Johnson (succeeded by Wendy Hiller) to success but mixed reviews. Many critics felt it too closely resembled Arthur Miller's Death of a Salesman, and had a brief but unsuccessful run on Broadway starring Hiller and Eric Portman.
- The Tiger and the Horse (1960) – is the first of Bolt's plays to develop his themes of individualism, society, authority, and politics. It concerns an ageing college professor, John Dean, who is running for Vice-Chancellor of a prestigious university, but finds his election undermined by his daughter's love affair, a political petition, and his wife's deteriorating mental state. The play starred Michael and Vanessa Redgrave, among others, and was directed by Frith Banbury.
- A Man for All Seasons (1960) – involves Sir Thomas More's conflict with Henry VIII over the latter's break with the Catholic Church. Adapted from a radio play Bolt had written in 1954, it is generally regarded as Bolt's finest work – and certainly his most successful. The BBC production was reviewed in the Listener on 5 August 1954. The play develops in full his themes of individuality versus society and authority as corrupt. The strain of Brechtianism which would pervade many of his later works is first present here, in the character of the 'Common Man', who both narrates and takes part in the action as various minor characters. The original run starred Paul Scofield as Thomas More, as well as Keith Baxter as Henry VIII, George Rose as the Common Man, Leo McKern as the Common Man in the West End production and Thomas Cromwell in the Broadway show (a role originated in London by Andrew Keir and later taken over by Thomas Gomez), and Albert Dekker as the Duke of Norfolk. It was a huge critical and commercial success on both sides of the Atlantic, has had several revivals, and was made into an equally acclaimed film in 1966.
- The Thwarting of Baron Bolligrew^{→de} (1963).
- Vivat! Vivat Regina! (1971) – Bolt's most successful show after A Man for All Seasons, a historical account of the reigns of Mary, Queen of Scots, and Elizabeth I of England, comparing and contrasting the personalities and reigns of the two female rulers. Highly successful, it ran for several months on Broadway, earning several Tony nominations. The original cast included Eileen Atkins as Elizabeth and Bolt's wife Sarah Miles as Mary. The play has experienced several revivals, most notably a 1985 Off-Broadway production starring Geraldine Page as Elizabeth.
- State of Revolution (1977) – An in-depth political depiction of the Russian Revolution of 1917, focusing on Vladimir Lenin as "a great man possessed by a terrible idea", and the struggles of Leon Trotsky and Joseph Stalin to gain power under him. It is told from the point of view of Lunacharsky, Lenin's Minister of Education. The original cast included Michael Bryant as Lenin, Terence Rigby as Stalin, Brian Blessed as Maxim Gorky and Michael Kitchen as Trotsky. Though meticulously researched, the play received mixed reviews. Bolt himself felt that he had not written the play as well as he might have done.

=== Screenplays ===
Bolt may be best remembered for his work on film and television screenplays. His work for director David Lean garnered him particular acclaim and recognition, and Bolt tried his hand at directing with the unsuccessful Lady Caroline Lamb (1972). While some criticised Bolt for focusing more on the personal aspects of his protagonists than the broader political context (particularly with Lawrence of Arabia and A Man for All Seasons), most critics and audiences alike praised his screenplays. Bolt won two Oscars, two BAFTA Awards and won or was nominated for several others.

- Lawrence of Arabia (with Michael Wilson) (1962) – despite disputes between Wilson and Bolt over who contributed what to the script, Bolt provided most of the film's dialogue and the interpretation of the characters while Wilson provided the characters and scenes in an initial draft screenplay. Wilson was uncredited at the time of the film's release, and Bolt alone was nominated for, but did not win, an Academy Award. Bolt and Lean refused to recognise Wilson's contribution to the film, and Wilson was not credited until 1995.
- Doctor Zhivago (1965) – Bolt won an Oscar for Best Adapted Screenplay
- A Man for All Seasons (1966) – Bolt won the Oscar again, adapting his own play to the screen.
- The Red Tent (1969) (uncredited additional dialogue)
- Ryan's Daughter (1970)
- Lady Caroline Lamb (1972) (also directed)
- The Bounty (1984)
- The Mission (1986) (originally published as a novel)
- A Man for All Seasons (1988)
- A Dry White Season (1989) (uncredited revisions of screenplay)
- Without Warning: The James Brady Story (1991) (TV)

Bolt also had several unrealised projects, including a TV miniseries adaptation of Gore Vidal's novel Burr; a film adaptation of Madeleine L'Engle's novel A Wrinkle in Time for Norman Lear; a script inspired by the Patty Hearst kidnapping called The Cover-Up with Oliver Stone; a film adaptation of Robert Littell's novel The October Circle for Hugh Hudson; a script about Irish patriot Michael Collins called Blest Souls with Michael Cimino; original screenplays about Galileo Galilei and explorers Scott and Amundsen; a film adaptation of André Malraux's novel Man's Fate also with Cimino; and a script about the life of Siddhartha called Buddha for Ron Fricke. Additionally, Bolt was briefly attached as writer for Gandhi and David Lean's unmade film version of Joseph Conrad's Nostromo, before he was replaced on both.

After being paid $US400,000 plus ten per cent of profits for his Ryan's Daughter screenplay, Bolt became, for a time, the highest-paid screenwriter in Hollywood.

== Awards and nominations ==
Award	Year	Category	Work	Result
Academy Awards	1963	Best Adapted Screenplay	Lawrence of Arabia	Nominated
Academy Awards	1966	Best Adapted Screenplay	Doctor Zhivago	Won
Academy Awards	1967	Best Adapted Screenplay	A Man for All Seasons	Won
BAFTA Awards	1963	Best British Screenplay	Lawrence of Arabia	Won
BAFTA Awards	1968	Best British Screenplay	A Man for All Seasons	Won
BAFTA Awards	1987	Best Original Screenplay	The Mission	Nominated
Golden Globe Awards	1966	Best Screenplay – Motion Picture	Doctor Zhivago	Won
Golden Globe Awards	1967	Best Screenplay – Motion Picture	A Man for All Seasons	Won
Golden Globe Awards	1987	Best Screenplay – Motion Picture	The Mission	Won
Primetime Emmy Awards	1992	Outstanding Individual Achievement in Writing in a Miniseries or Special	Without Warning: The James Brady Story	Nominated
Tony Awards	1962	Best Play	A Man for All Seasons	Won
Tony Awards	1972	Best Play	Vivat! Vivat Regina!	Nominated
Society of West End Theatre Awards	1977	Play of the Year	State of Revolution	Nominated

== Film Appearance ==
- Lawrence of Arabia (1962) – Officer with Pipe Gazing at Lawrence (uncredited)

== Bibliography ==
- Prüfer, Sabine. The Individual at the Crossroads: The Works of Robert Bolt, Novelist, Dramatist, Screenwriter. Frankfurt am Main; New York: Peter Lang, 1998
- Turner, Adrian. Robert Bolt: Scenes from Two Lives. London: Hutchinson, 1998. ISBN 0-09-180176-1.

Trade union offices
Preceded by George Elvin	President of the Association of Cinematograph, Television and Allied Technicians; 1974–c.1980	Succeeded by Ron Bowie
