= John Tewkesbury =

Protestant burned for heresy

John Tewkesbury (died 20 December 1531) was a Paternoster Row leather merchant in London and Protestant reformer, convicted of heresy and burned at the stake in West Smithfield, London, on 20 December 1531.

== Protestant conversion ==
In 1512, Tewkesbury came into the possession of a manuscript copy of the Bible. He later bought an English language translation of the New Testament (1526) by William Tyndale. "He was a clever and eloquent man and a man of influence in London. He was one of the most knowledgeable of the Scriptures of all the evangelicals." He was converted by reading Tyndale's New Testament and The Parable of the Wicked Mammon (1528).

== First arrest ==
=== Arrest and discovery ===
On Wednesday 21 April 1529 Tewkesbury was arrested and brought before Cuthbert Tunstall, Bishop of London, and his assistants, Henry Standish, bishop of St. Asaph, and John Islip, abbot of Westminster. Tewkesbury's eloquence stunned the bishops. Realizing that he could effectively argue through Scripture, they decided further inquiry was in order.

=== Examination ===
Later that month, Tewkesbury was examined before the bishops Cuthbert Tunstall of London, Nicholas West of Ely, John Longland of Lincoln, and John Clerk of Bath and Wells regarding The Wicked Mammon, which he had sold. He was questioned regarding nineteen articles from the book. His final reply was, "I pray you reform yourself, and if there be any error in the book, let it be reformed. I think it is good enough."

He was ordered to appear the following day, before John Cox, vicar-general to the archbishop of Canterbury, Galfride Warton, Rowland Philips, William Philow, and Robert Ridley, professors of divinity. Tewkesbury appeared again and was examined on five articles from The Wicked Mammon. The consensus among the inquisitors was that knowledge and independent thinking by the laity was even more dangerous than the heresy of some priests.

=== Punishment ===
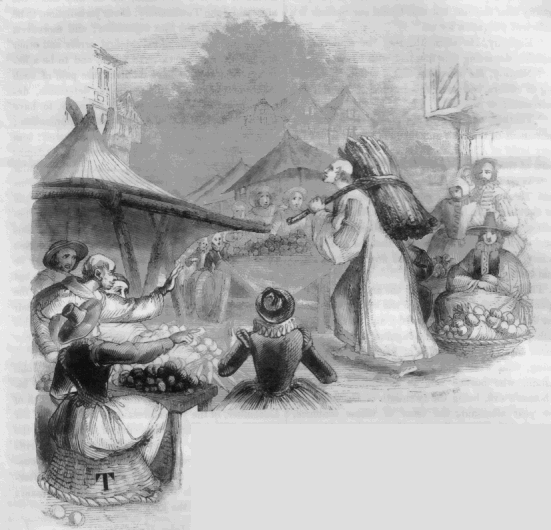
John Tewkesbury carrying a bundle of sticks, from "The Acts and Monuments of the Christian Church" (Book of Martyrs).

On 8 May, he was ordered to carry a bundle of sticks at St. Paul's Church on the following Sunday. He was to carry a bundle of sticks other places on the following week and wear sticks embroidered on both sleeves. He was also ordered to enter the monastery of St. Bartholomew's on Whitsunday eve (30 May) and remain there until released by the Bishop. Following his incarceration at the monastery, he renounced his prior beliefs and was released.

== Second arrest ==
=== Betrayal ===
In close co-operation with Cuthbert Tunstall's successor, John Stokesley, Sir Thomas More, Lord Chancellor of England, arrested George Constantine, a Protestant book dealer, for heresy in 1531. Before escaping in early December, Constantine revealed the names of several fellow reformers.

=== Arrest and discovery ===
Following his betrayal by Constantine, Tewkesbury was immediately arrested and held in the porter's lodge at More's Chelsea house.

The popular anti-Catholic polemicist John Foxe claims More had Tewkesbury pinioned "hand, foot, and head in the stocks" for six days before having him whipped at "Jesu's tree" in his garden, "and also twisted his brows with small ropes, so that the blood started out of his eyes".

More himself, however, denied such claims in his "Apology" (1533), which were circulating in continental Protestant at the time:

Stories of a similar nature were current even in More's lifetime and he denied them forcefully. He admitted that he did imprison heretics in his house – 'theyr sure kepynge' – he called it – but he utterly rejected claims of torture and whipping... 'as help me God.'

=== Examination ===
Tewkesbury was subsequently moved to the Tower of London and confessed to Stokesley that he had read The Obedience of a Christian Man and The Wicked Mammon since recanting his beliefs two years earlier. He also confessed to removing the embroidered twigs from his sleeves and other alleged heresies.

=== Execution ===
The sentence against John Tewkesbury was read and pronounced by John Stokesley, Bishop of London on 16 December 1531 in the house of Sir Thomas More. After this sentence, without a king's writ for their warrant, the sheriffs of London, Richard Gresham and Edward Altam, took Tewkesbury into custody. On St. Thomas' eve, Sunday 20 December 1531, the sheriffs burned him at the stake opposite the Priory Church of St. Bartholomew's the Great, in West Smithfield, London.

== Modern culture ==
In 2013, Patrick Gabridge's Fire on Earth, a full-length historical drama in two acts, premiered in Boston. John Tewksbury's character in the play is a composite of Tewkesbury and fellow martyrs, including Richard Bayfield and Thomas Hitton.

== See also ==
- English Reformation
- James Bainham
- Richard Bayfield
- Thomas Bilney
- John Fisher
- Thomas Hitton
- Thomas More
- William Tyndale
