= Defence of the Seven Sacraments =

Theological treatise by King Henry VIII of England

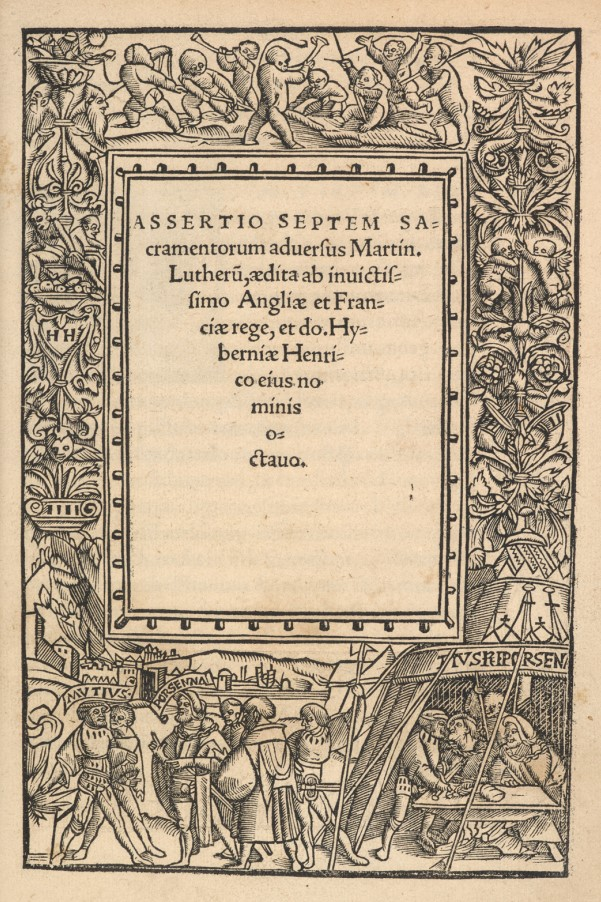
- The title page of a printed edition of Henry VIII's Assertio septem sacramentum
- Author: Henry VIII, Thomas More
- Translator: Louis O'Donovan
- Language: Latin
- Series: Theology
- Publisher: King's College Press
- Publication date: 1521
- Publication place: Kingdom of England
- Media type: Print

The Defence of the Seven Sacraments (Latin: Assertio Septem Sacramentorum) is a theological treatise published in 1521, written by King Henry VIII, allegedly with the assistance of Sir Thomas More. The extent of More's involvement with this project has been a point of contention since its publication.

Henry started to write it in 1519 while he was reading Martin Luther's Ninety-five Theses. By June of that year, he had shown it to Thomas Wolsey, but it remained private until three years later when the earlier manuscript became the first two chapters of the Assertio, the rest consisting of new material relating to Luther's De Captivitate Babylonica.

Author J. J. Scarisbrick describes the work as "one of the most successful pieces of Catholic polemics produced by the first generation of anti-Protestant writers". It went through some twenty editions in the sixteenth century and, as early as 1522, had appeared in two different German translations.

The treatise was dedicated to Pope Leo X, who rewarded Henry with the title Fidei Defensor (Defender of the Faith) in October 1521 (a title revoked following the king's break with the Catholic Church in the 1530s, but re-awarded to his heir by the English Parliament).

Luther's reply to the Assertio (Against Henry, King of the English) was, in turn, replied to by Thomas More, who was one of the leaders of the Catholic Renaissance humanists in England (Responsio ad Lutherum).

The British Library still has King Henry's personal copy of Marko Marulić's Evangelistiarium, a book that was read in English and much admired by Thomas More. Extensive margin notes in the king's own hand prove that Marulić's book was a major source used by the king in the writing of Defence of the Seven Sacraments.

== Editions and translations ==
Readings from the Assertio Septem Sacramentorum and the responses from Luther and More, with English subtitles.

- O'Donovan, L. O. & Gibbons, J. (1908). 'Assertio Septem Sacramentorum' (English and Latin). New York, NY: Benziger Bros. Publishing
- O'Donovan, L. O. & Curtin, D. P. (2018). 'Defense of the Seven Sacraments' (with additional Papal correspondence). Philadelphia, PA: Barnes & Noble Press

== See also ==
- Sacraments of the Catholic Church
- English Reformation
- Henry VIII
- Thomas More
