= Against Henry, King of the English =

1522 book by Martin Luther

Against Henry, King of the English, originally in Latin as Contra Henricum Regem Anglie, was a book written in 1522 by Martin Luther against Henry VIII. It was a response to Henry's book, Defence of the Seven Sacraments. Thomas More then wrote Responsio ad Lutherum as a reply.
