= Simon Fish =

16th-century English Protestant writer

Simon Fish (died 1533) was a 16th-century English lawyer and Protestant pamphleteer. He is best known for helping to spread William Tyndale's New Testament and for writing the vehemently anti-clerical pamphlet Supplication for the Beggars (A Supplycacion for the Beggars) which the Roman Catholic Church condemned as heretical on 24 May 1530. His pamphlet can be seen as a precursor to the English Reformation and the Protestant Reformation. Fish was eventually arrested in London on charges of heresy, but he died from Bubonic plague before he could stand trial. His widow married vocal reformer James Bainham, and then became a widow again in April 1532 when Bainham was burned at the stake as a heretic.

== Supplication for the Beggars ==
Fish wrote his incendiary pamphlet Supplication for the Beggars during his second exile in Antwerp. The 16-page pamphlet accused the Roman Catholic Church of everything from avarice to murder to treason. Joannes Grapheus of Antwerp was probably the printer, but that is unconfirmed. The Supplication was smuggled into England from Antwerp, penetrating the country's borders despite its prohibition. Fish had dedicated it to King Henry VIII. According to John Foxe, Fish's Supplication arrived in England on 2 February 1529.

=== Economic Argument ===
Fish's pamphlet cries out to the king on behalf of the poor and accuses the Roman Catholic Church and its clergy of increasing their miseries.

Most lamentably compleyneth theyre wofull mysery vnto youre highnes youre poore daily bedemen the wretched hidous monstres (on whome scarcely for horror any yie dare loke) the foule vnhappy sort of lepres, and other sore people, needy, impotent, blinde, lame, and sike that live onely by almesse, howe that theyre nombre is daily so sore encreased that all the almesse of all the weldisposed people of this youre realme is not half ynough for to susteine theim, but that for verey contreint they die for hunger.

Fish argues that the clergy and the Roman Catholic Church hold a disproportionate share of England's resources, alleging that they hold half of England's wealth while only representing 1/100 of the male population and only 1/400 of the total population. The monasteries, he claims, further compound the Church's corruption by heaping taxes on the poor instead of helping them. Fish calculates that the English clergy own 1/3 of the land and 1/10 of all farm produce and live stock, and simultaneously receive 1/10 of all servants' wages within England. The pamphlet finds that, if there were ten households for each of the 52,000 parish churches in England, then just one of five orders of mendicant friars alone would take in an annual £43.333 6s. 8de. These economic arguments compose the bulk of his pamphlet's claims, and they might have gained further strength because an economic crisis had crippled all of Europe by 1529.

=== Theological Argument ===
Fish's pamphlet also lodges specific theological objections against the Roman Catholic Church. His two principal arguments contest the existence of purgatory and the sale of indulgences.

==== Against the Doctrine of Purgatory ====
Fish expends few words on theological matters. With regard to purgatory, he simply contends that "there is not one word spoken of it in all holy scripture", making an argument in line with the Reformation idea of Sola scriptura. To contest the doctrine of purgatory, he continues to state that "we have no command from God to pray for the dead". Beyond these statements, however, Fish furnishes no further details in defence of his position.

Fish also rejects the sale of indulgences and argues that the supposed act of penance was merely a ruse to fill the clergy's coffers.

They sey also that if there were a purgatory, and also if that the pope with his pardons for money may deliuer one soule thens: he may deliuer him aswel without money: if he may deliuer one, he may deliuer a thousand: yf he may deliuer a thousand he may deliuer theim all, and so destroy purgatory. And then is he a cruell tyraunt without all charitie if he kepe theim there in prison and in paine till men will giue him money.

He calls all Catholic clerics "tyrauntes" who "lakke charite" because they would withhold prayers for a person who could not pay for them.

=== Anti-Clerical Argument ===
Fish claims that the clergy is attempting to usurp the power of the state. At present, Fish holds that the power of the clergy has surpassed that of the state, creating their own sovereign, subversive state. Despite attempts by the state to enact laws to restrain the clergy, these laws remained ineffective. Fish references the ancient kings of the Britons, likely in an attempt to play off of Henry's own Welsh background. These kings, Fish explains, never allowed themselves to be subjugated by the clergy or assent to taxation by foreign representatives. Rather, they kept a firm hand on such external powers. Fish explains that it was thanks to “so many clerical parasites among them as now infest the realm of England” that the Danes, Saxons, and the Romans succeeded against England. The Supplycacion warns Henry that should he fail to meet the needs of the poor, they will rise up against as they did with King John.

==== Anti-Clerical Charges: The Case of Richard Hunne ====
To make his anti-clerical case, Fish cites the case of Richard Hunne, which at the time was a sensational story. It is not surprising, then, that in More's response to Fish's historical claims, the Hunne scandal merited more ink than any of Fish's other historical contention.

The controversy began in 1514 when Hunne, a wealthy Londoner, refused to pay a burial fee to his parish priest for the burial of Hunne's child. The priest sued Hunne in ecclesiastical court; Hunne counter-sued, insisting that the case fell within the jurisdictional purview of common law, not ecclesiastical law. Upon filing his suit, Hunne was seized on charges of heresy and taken to the Bishop of London's prison. Hunne was found two days later in his cell, dead, hanging by a rope. The clergy claimed Hunne had committed suicide, but the coroner's investigation found signs of foul play. The evidence later collected suggested that the chancellor of the Bishop of London, Dr. Horsey, was responsible for the death. Dr. Horsey, however, never stood trial because the Bishop of London obtained a royal pardon on his behalf. Fish uses this incident to argue that the clergy used the brand of heresy to persecute.

==== Anti-Clerical Charges: Treachery and Corruption ====
Fish's pamphlet declares the clergy treasonous and corrupt. The clergy, according to Fish, levy crippling taxes that sap the population of funds they could otherwise use to support the king and finance defence measures. Moreover, the clergy themselves are excluded from the government's tax base. The clergy's resulting largess provides them with the requisite power to oppose the king, which Fish dubs the clergy's “treason fund.”

This charge of treason against the clergy, according to the pamphlet, is rooted in fact that the clergy have “placed themselves above the law of the realm.” The mere existence of ecclesiastical courts is another sign of this treason. Hunne was murdered, Fish maintains, because he properly recognise the king's authority as existing above that of the clergy.

As for the clergy's corruption, Fish launches an assault against the clergy based upon their inability to marry. His pamphlet asserts that this requirement moves the clergy, with their expendable wealth, to entice women to lead lives of sin.

"By all the sleyghtes they may to haue to do with euery mannes wife, euery mannes daughter, and euery mannes mayde, that cukkoldrie and baudrie shulde reigne ouer all among your sibiectres, that noman shoulde knowe his owne childe, that theyre bastardes…These be they that by theire absteyning from marriage do let the generation of the people whereby all the realme at length if it should be continued shall be made desert and inhabitable."

Fish's shocking claims continue with arguments that priests’ deplorable sexual promiscuity spreads diseases thereby corrupting “the hole generation of mankind yn your realme, that catche the pokes of one woman,” and who “catch the lepry of one woman, and bere it to an other…”

== Supplycatyon of Soulys: Thomas More’s Response to Simon Fish ==
Within months of the circulation of Fish's pamphlet, Sir Thomas More produced a response in defence of the Catholic Church, entitled The Supplycatyon of Soulys. The response, printed by October 1529, came in two books, the first addressing the social and economic concerns raised by Fish, and the second defending the doctrine of purgatory. More's lengthy, legalistic and logic-driven response was ten-times longer than Fish's sixteen-page pamphlet.

According to More, Fish recanted.

== Legacy ==
Fish's legacy continues through his famous pamphlet. Its repeated printings, either despite or because of its banned status, show the sustained interest in the piece throughout the sixteenth-century. After its initial circulation, the Supplycacion is known to have been reprinted five times in the nineteenth century and twice in the twentieth century, not counting its repeated inclusion in various editions of John Foxe's Acts and Monuments that reach up into the present. Fish's propagandistic pamphlet functioned within a broader, international clash that entangled politics and religion. Joining in a growing anti-clerical movement, Fish's pamphlet, however inflammatory, demonstrates some of the popular objections to the Roman Catholic Church in the years preceding the English Reformation.
