= Thomas More =

English politician, author and philosopher (1478–1535)

Sir Thomas More
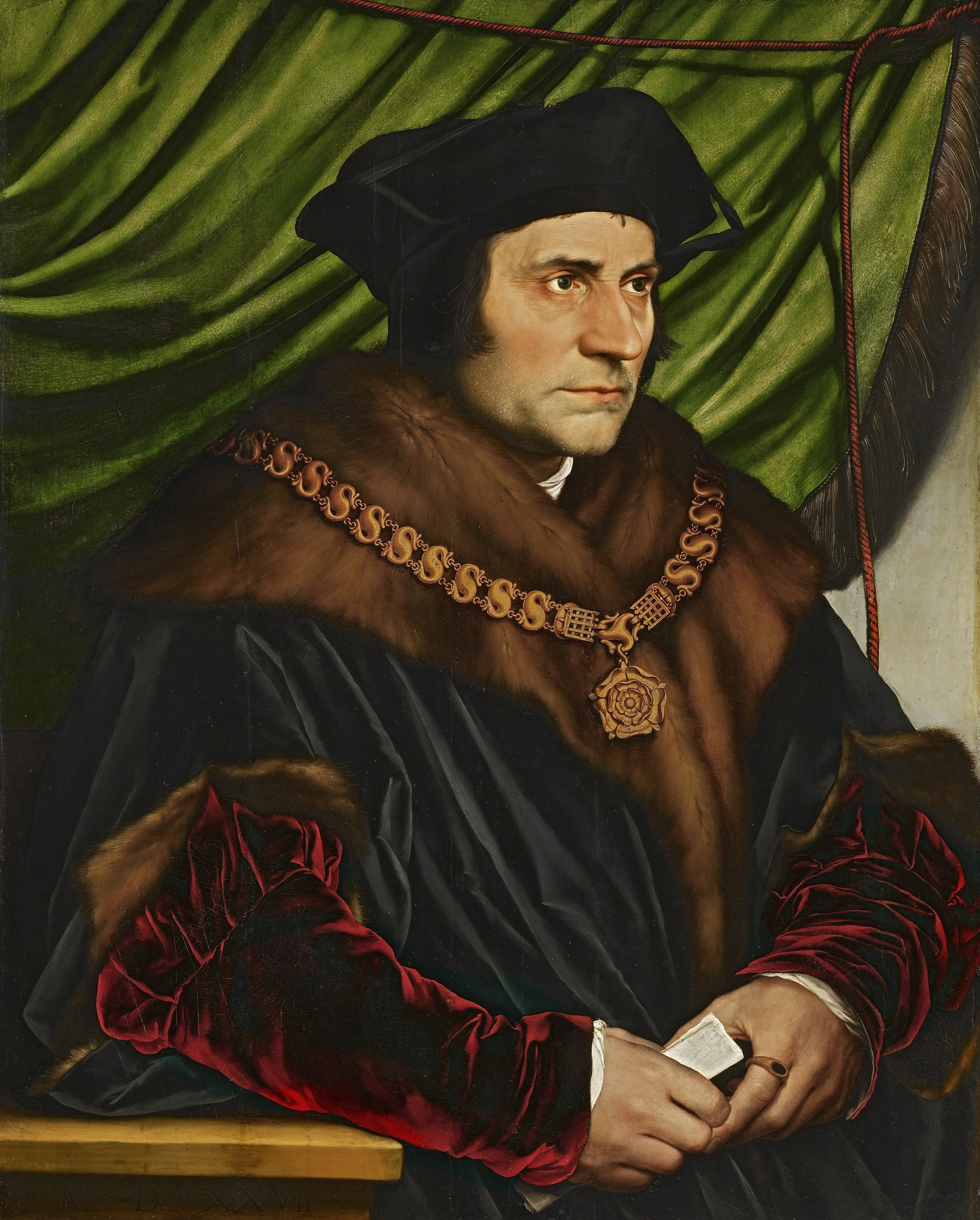
- Sir Thomas More (1527)

Lord Chancellor
- In office 26 October 1529 – 16 May 1532
- Monarch: Henry VIII
- Preceded by: Thomas Wolsey
- Succeeded by: Thomas Audley

Chancellor of the Duchy of Lancaster
- In office 31 December 1525 – 3 November 1529
- Monarch: Henry VIII
- Preceded by: Richard Wingfield
- Succeeded by: William FitzWilliam

Speaker of the House of Commons
- In office 15 April 1523 – 13 August 1523
- Monarch: Henry VIII
- Preceded by: Thomas Nevill
- Succeeded by: Thomas Audley

Personal details
- Born: 7 February 1478 City of London, England
- Died: 6 July 1535 (aged 57) Tower Hill, London, England
- Cause of death: Execution by beheading
- Resting place: Church of St Peter ad Vincula (body); St Dunstan's Church, Canterbury or Chelsea Old Church (head)
- Spouses: Jane Colt (m. 1505; died 1511) Alice Middleton (m. 1511)
- Children: Margaret; Elizabeth; Cecily; John
- Parents: Sir John More; Agnes Graunger
- Education: University of Oxford; Lincoln's Inn

Philosophical work
- Era: Renaissance philosophy; 16th-century philosophy
- Region: Western philosophy
- School: Christian humanism; Renaissance humanism
- Main interests: Social philosophy; Criticism of Protestantism; Legal equity; Conscience
- Notable works: Utopia (1516); Responsio ad Lutherum (1523); A Dialogue of Comfort against Tribulation (1553)
- Notable ideas: Utopia

Sir Thomas More (7 February 1478 – 6 July 1535), venerated in the Catholic Church as a martyr and saint, was an English lawyer, judge, social philosopher, author, statesman, theologian and Renaissance humanist. He also served Henry VIII as Lord Chancellor from October 1529 to May 1532. He wrote Utopia, published in 1516, which describes the political system of an imaginary island state.

More opposed the Protestant Reformation, directing polemics against the theology of Martin Luther, Huldrych Zwingli and William Tyndale. More also opposed Henry VIII's separation from the Catholic Church, refusing to acknowledge Henry as supreme head of the Church of England and the annulment of his marriage to Catherine of Aragon. After refusing to take the Oath of Supremacy, More was convicted of treason on what he stated was false evidence, and was executed. At his execution, he was reported to have said: "I die the King's good servant, and God's first."

Pope Pius XI canonised More in 1935 as a martyr. Pope John Paul II in 2000 declared him the patron saint of statesmen and politicians. In his proclamation the pope stated: "It can be said that he demonstrated in a singular way the value of a moral conscience ... even if, in his actions against heretics, he reflected the limits of the culture of his time".

== Early life ==
Born in the City of London, on 7 February 1478, Thomas More was the son of Sir John More (a successful lawyer and later a judge) and his wife Agnes (née Graunger). John More lived most of his life in Milk Street, London and, from this, many biographers (starting in the seventeenth century with More's great-grandson Cresacre More (1572–1649), the youngest son and eventual heir of Thomas More II) have asserted, without confirmation, that this was the place of Thomas More's birth. No contemporary biographer recorded this. He was the second of six children. More was educated at St. Anthony's School, then considered one of London's best schools. From 1490 to 1492, More served John Morton, the Archbishop of Canterbury and Lord Chancellor of England, as a household page.

Morton enthusiastically supported the "New Learning" (scholarship which was later known as "humanism" or "London humanism"), and thought highly of the young More. Believing that More had great potential, Morton nominated him for a place at the University of Oxford, either in St. Mary Hall or Canterbury College, both now defunct.

More began his studies at Oxford in 1492. He received a classical education studying under Thomas Linacre and William Grocyn, and he became proficient in both Latin and Greek. More left Oxford after only two years—at his father's insistence—to begin legal training in London at New Inn, one of the Inns of Chancery. In 1496, More became a student at Lincoln's Inn, one of the Inns of Court, where he remained until 1502, when he was called to the bar.

A noted linguist, More could speak and banter in Latin with the same facility as in English, and had competency in Greek and several other languages. He wrote and translated poetry. He was particularly influenced by Pico della Mirandola and translated the Life of Pico into English.

== Spiritual life ==
According to his friend, the theologian Desiderius Erasmus of Rotterdam, More once seriously contemplated abandoning his legal career to become a monk. Between 1503 and 1504 More lived near the Carthusian monastery outside the walls of London and joined in the monks' spiritual exercises. Although he deeply admired their piety, More ultimately decided to remain a layman, standing for election to Parliament in 1504 and marrying the following year.

More continued ascetic practices for the rest of his life, such as wearing a hair shirt next to his skin and occasionally engaging in self-flagellation. A tradition of the Third Order of Saint Francis honours More as a member of that Order on their calendar of saints.

== Family life ==
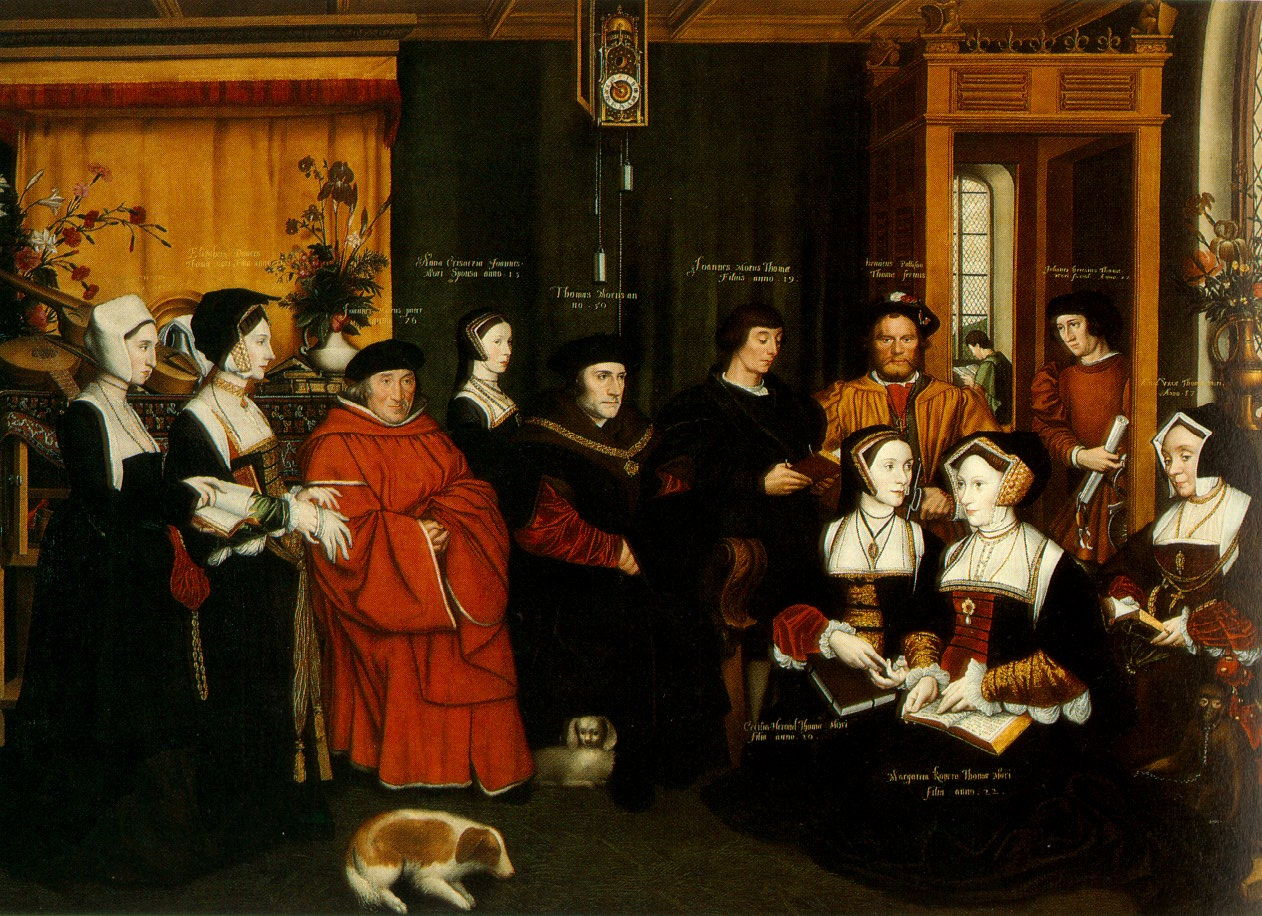
Rowland Lockey after Hans Holbein the Younger, The Family of Sir Thomas More, c. 1594, Nostell Priory, West Yorkshire

More married Joanna "Jane" Colt, the eldest daughter of John Colt of Essex in 1505. In that year he leased a portion of a house known as the Old Barge (originally there had been a wharf nearby serving the Walbrook river) on Bucklersbury, St Stephen Walbrook parish, London. Eight years later he took over the rest of the house and in total he lived there for almost 20 years, until his move to Chelsea in 1525. Erasmus reported that More wanted to give his young wife a better education than she had previously received at home, and tutored her in music and literature. The couple had four children: Margaret, Elizabeth, Cecily, and John. Jane died in 1511.

Going "against friends' advice and common custom," within 30 days, More had married one of the many eligible women among his wide circle of friends. He chose Alice Middleton, a widow, to head his household and care for his small children. The speed of the marriage was so unusual that More had to get a dispensation from the banns of marriage, which, due to his good public reputation, he easily obtained.

More had no children from his second marriage, although he raised Alice's daughter from her previous marriage, Alice Alington, as his own. More also became the guardian of two young girls: Anne Cresacre, who eventually married his son John More, and Margaret Giggs (later Clement), the orphaned daughter of his biological daughter's wet nurse. An affectionate father, More wrote letters to his children whenever he was away on legal or government business, and encouraged them to write to him often.

More insisted upon giving his daughters the same classical education as his son, an unusual attitude at the time. His eldest daughter, Margaret, attracted much admiration for her erudition, especially her fluency in Greek and Latin. More told his daughter of his pride in her academic accomplishments in September 1522, after he showed the bishop a letter she had written:

When he saw from the signature that it was the letter of a lady, his surprise led him to read it more eagerly [...] he said he would never have believed it to be your work unless I had assured him of the fact, and he began to praise it in the highest terms [...] for its pure Latinity, its correctness, its erudition, and its expressions of tender affection. He took out at once from his pocket a portague [A Portuguese gold coin] [...] to send to you as a pledge and token of his good will towards you.

More's decision to educate his daughters set an example for other noble families. Even Erasmus became much more favourable once he witnessed their accomplishments.

A large portrait of More and his extended family, Sir Thomas More and Family, was painted by Hans Holbein the Younger; however, it was lost in a fire in the 18th century. More's grandson commissioned a copy, of which two versions survive. The Nostell copy of the portrait shown above also includes the family's household fool Henry Patenson, two pet dogs and monkey. (Note: Erasmus wrote about this monkey in his Colloquy Amicitia.)

Musical instruments such as a lute and viol feature in the background of the extant copies of Holbein's family portrait. More played the recorder and viol, and made sure his wives could join in the family consort. (Note: "Sir Thomas More's first wife was instructed 'in learning and every kind of music'; his second wife, in middle age, was induced 'to learn to play apon the gittern, the lute, the clavichord and the recorders.'" Stevens, John (1961). Music & Poetry in the Early Tudor Court. CUP Archive., p 276)

== Personality according to Erasmus ==
Concerning More's personality, Erasmus gave a consistent portrait over a period of 35 years.

Soon after meeting the young lawyer More, who became his best friend (Note: Victorian biographer Seebohm commented "Along with great intellectual gifts was combined in the young student (More) a gentle and loving disposition, which threw itself into the bosom of a friend with so guileless and pure an affection, that when men came under the power of its unconscious enchantment they literally fell in love with More.") and invited Erasmus into his household, Erasmus reported in 1500 "Did nature ever invent anything kinder, sweeter or more harmonious than the character of Thomas More?". In 1519, he wrote that More was "born and designed for friendship; (Note: "More held that the experience of friendship is a partial anticipation of the secure friendship of heaven, where we may hope that all will "be merry together"—not just our friends in this life but our enemies too." McEvoy, James (2006). "The Theory of Friendship in Erasmus and Thomas More". American Catholic Philosophical Quarterly. 80 (2): 227–252. doi:10.5840/acpq200680243.) no one is more open-hearted in making friends or more tenacious in keeping them." In 1535, after More's execution, Erasmus wrote that More "never bore ill-intent towards anyone":

We are 'together, you and I, a crowd'; that is my feeling, and I think I could live happily with you in any wilderness. Farewell, dearest Erasmus, dear as the apple of my eye.

— Thomas More to Erasmus, October 31, 1516

When More died I seem to have died myself: because we were a single soul as Pythagoras once said. But such is the flux of human affairs.

— Erasmus to Piotr Tomicki (Bishop of Kraków), August 31, 1535

In a 1532 letter, Erasmus wrote "such is the kindliness of his disposition, or rather, to say it better, such is his piety and wisdom, that whatever comes his way that cannot be corrected, he comes to love just as wholeheartedly as if nothing better could have happened to him."

In a 1533 letter, Erasmus described More's character as imperiosus – commanding, far-ruling, not at all timid.

For his part, More was an "unflagging apologist" for Erasmus during the course of their lives.

== Early political career ==
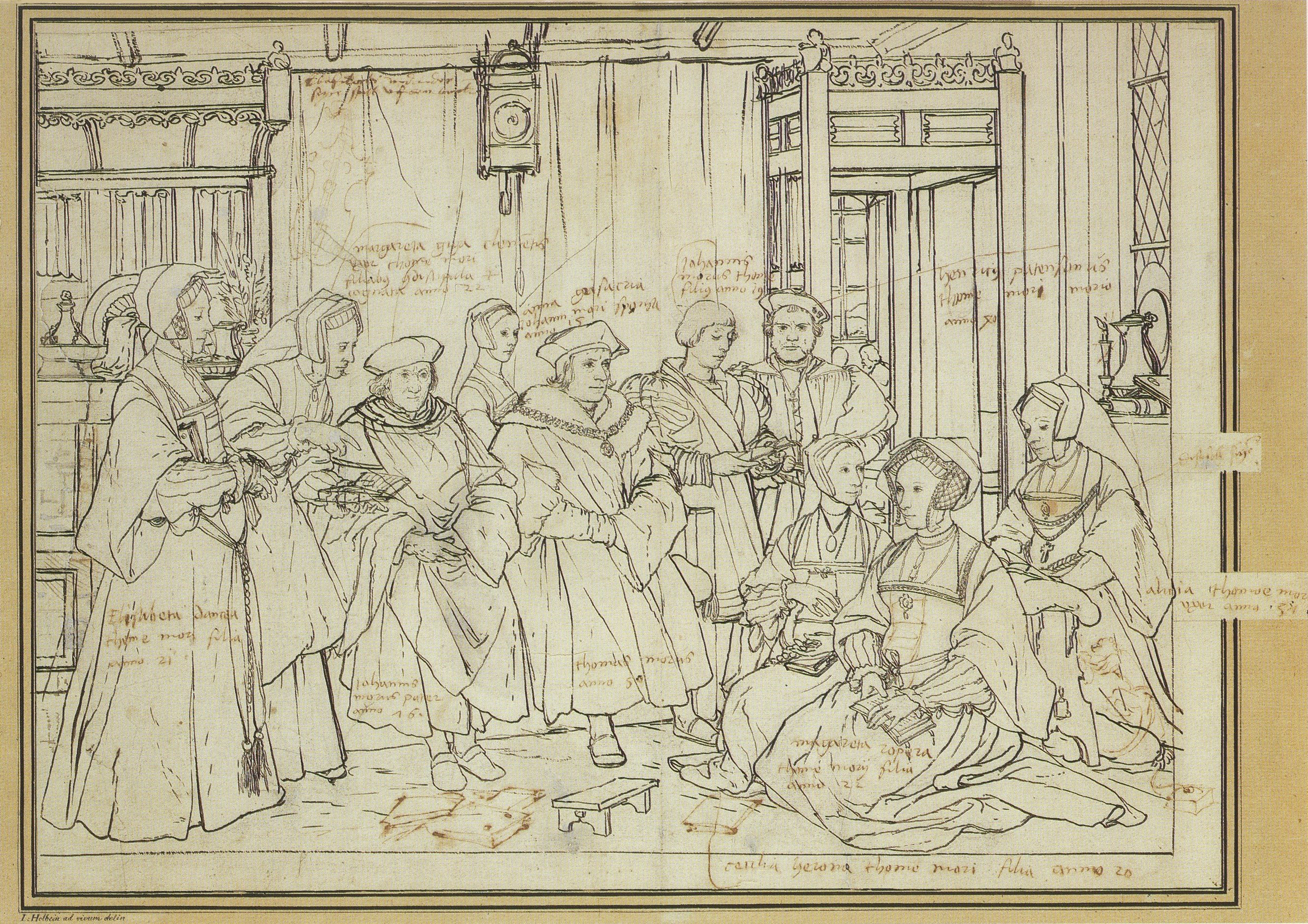
Study for a portrait of Thomas More's family, c. 1527, by Hans Holbein the Younger

In 1504, More was elected to Parliament to represent Great Yarmouth, and in 1510 began representing London.

More first attracted public attention by his conduct in the parliament of 1504, by his daring opposition to the King's demand for money. King Henry VII was entitled, according to feudal laws, to a grant on occasion of his daughter Margaret Tudor's marriage to James IV of Scotland. But he came to the House of Commons for a much larger sum than he intended to give with his daughter. The members, unwilling as they were to vote the money, were afraid to offend the King, until the silence was broken by More, whose speech is said to have moved the house to reduce the subsidy of three-fifteenths which the Government had demanded to £30,000. One of the chamberlains went and told his master that he had been thwarted by a beardless boy. Henry never forgave the audacity; but, for the moment, the only revenge he could take was upon More's father, whom upon some pretext he threw into the Tower, and he only released him upon payment of a fine of £100. Thomas More even found it advisable to withdraw from public life into obscurity.

Henry died in 1509 and was succeeded by his son, who became King Henry VIII.

From 1510, More served as one of the two undersheriffs of the City of London, a position of considerable responsibility in which he earned a reputation as an honest and effective public servant. Interested in public health, he became a Commissioner for Sewers in 1514. More became Master of Requests in 1514, the same year in which he was appointed as a Privy Counsellor. After undertaking a diplomatic mission to the Holy Roman Emperor, Charles V, accompanying Thomas Wolsey, Cardinal Archbishop of York, to Calais (for the Field of the Cloth of Gold) and Bruges, More was knighted and made under-treasurer of the Exchequer in 1521.

As secretary and personal adviser to Henry VIII, More became increasingly influential: welcoming foreign diplomats, drafting official documents, attending the court of the Star Chamber for his legal prowess but delegated to judge in the under-court for 'poor man's cases' and serving as a liaison between the King and Lord Chancellor Wolsey. More later served as High Steward for the Universities of Oxford and Cambridge.

In 1523, More was elected as knight of the shire (MP) for Middlesex and, on Wolsey's recommendation, the House of Commons elected More its Speaker. In 1525, More became Chancellor of the Duchy of Lancaster, with executive and judicial responsibilities over much of northern England.

== Chancellorship ==
After Wolsey fell, More succeeded to the office of Lord Chancellor (the chief government minister) in 1529; this was the highest official responsible for equity and common law, including contracts and royal household cases, and some misdemeanour appeals. He dispatched cases with unprecedented rapidity. Putting into effect his proposals for public sanitation that he had first suggested in Utopia, in 1532 he was responsible for introducing into law the Statute of Sewers (23 Henry VIII, cap.5).

As Lord Chancellor he was a member (and probably the Presiding Judge at the court when present, who spoke last and cast the deciding vote in case of ties) of the Court of the Star Chamber, an appeals court on civil and criminal matters, including riot and sedition, that was the final appeal in dissenter's trials. (Note: It seems this court could affirm a conviction that carried the death penalty, but not impose it.Snell, Melissa. "English Court of Star Chamber: A Brief History". ThoughtCo.)

No foreign wars were fought in the time he was Lord Chancellor.

=== Campaign against the Protestant Reformation ===
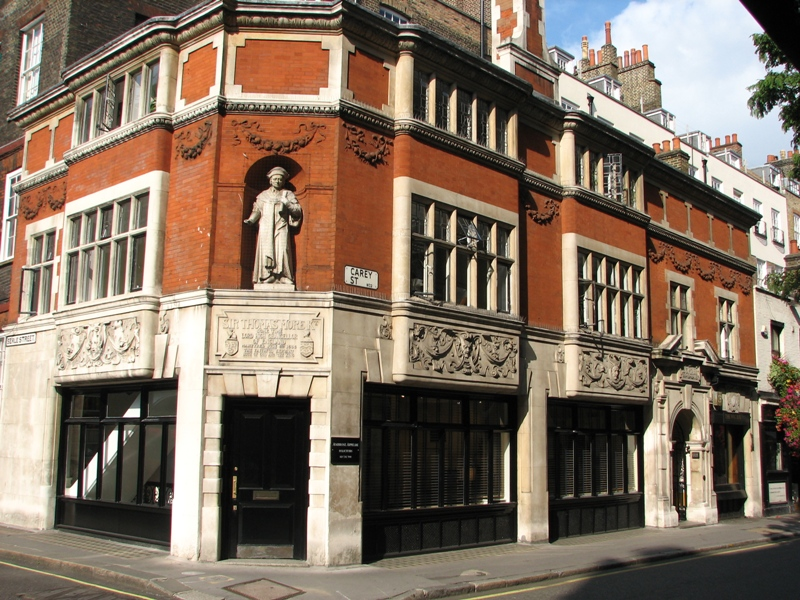
More is commemorated with a sculpture at the late-19th-century Sir Thomas More House, Carey Street, London, opposite the Royal Courts of Justice.

More supported the Catholic Church and saw the Protestant Reformation as heresy, a threat to the unity of both church and society. More believed in the theology, argumentation, and ecclesiastical laws of the church, and "heard Luther's call to destroy the Catholic Church as a call to war."

Heresy was the single most time-consuming issue Thomas More dealt with in his chancellorship, and probably in the whole of the last ten years of his life.

— Richard Rex, More and the heretics: statesman or fanatic?

More wrote a series of books and pamphlets in English and Latin to respond to Protestants, and in his official capacities took action against the illegal book trade, notably fronting a diplomatically-sensitive raid in 1525 of the Hanseatic Merchants in the Steelyard in his role as chancellor of the Duchy of Lancaster and given his diplomatic experience negotiating with the Hanse.

==== Debates with Tyndale ====
More wrote several books against the first edition of William Tyndale's English translation of the New Testament. More wrote the Dialogue concerning Heresies (1529), Tyndale responded with An Answer to Sir T. More's Dialogue (1530), and More replied with his Confutation of Tyndale's Answer (1532). More also wrote or contributed to several other anti-Lutheran books.

One of More's criticisms of the initial Tyndale translation was that despite claiming to be in the vernacular, Tyndale had employed numerous neologisms: for example, Jehovah, scapegoat, Passover, atonement, mercy seat, shewbread. More also accused Tyndale of deliberately avoiding common translations in favour of biased words: such as using the emotion love instead of the practical action charity for Greek agape, using the neologism senior instead of priest for the Greek presbyteros (Tyndale changed this to elder), and the Latinate congregation instead of church. Tyndale's Bibles include text other than the scriptures: some of Tyndale's prefaces were direct translations of Martin Luther, and it included marginal glosses which challenged Catholic doctrine.

One notable exchange occurred over More's attack on Tyndale's use of congregation. Tyndale pointed out that he was following "your darling" Erasmus' Latin translation of ecclesia into congregatio. More replied that Erasmus needed to coin congregatio because there was no good Latin word, while English had the perfectly fine church, but that the intent and theology under the words were all important:

I have not contended with Erasmus my darling, because I found no such malicious intent with Erasmus my darling, as I find with Tyndale. For had I found with Erasmus my darling the cunning intent and purpose that I find in Tyndale: Erasmus my darling should be no more my darling. But I find in Erasmus my darling that he detests and abhors the errors and heresies that Tyndale plainly teaches and abides by and therefore Erasmus my darling shall be my dear darling still. And surely if Tyndale had either never taught them, or yet had the grace to revoke them: then should Tyndale be my dear darling too. But while he holds such heresies still I cannot take for my darling him that the devil takes for his darling.

— Thomas More (Note: Louis Martz points out that More's repeated references to Erasmus as "darling" was his retort to Tyndale's mocking use of the word, being an adroit example of the rhetorical technique of repetition. He quipped that, unlike Erasmus, Tyndale could never be his darling: Martz, Louis L. (1990). Thomas More: the search for the inner man. New Haven, CT: Yale University Press. pp. 36–37. ISBN 9780300056686.)

=== Resignation ===
As the conflict over supremacy between the papacy and the king reached its peak, More continued to remain steadfast in supporting the supremacy of the Pope as Successor of Peter over that of the King of England. Parliament's reinstatement of the charge of praemunire in 1529 had made it a crime to support in public or office the claim of any authority outside the realm (such as the papacy) to have a legal jurisdiction superior to the king's.

In 1530, More refused to sign a letter by the leading English churchmen and aristocrats asking Pope Clement VII to annul Henry's marriage to Catherine of Aragon, and also quarrelled with Henry VIII over the heresy laws. In 1531, a royal decree required the clergy to take an oath acknowledging the King as Supreme Head of the Church of England. The bishops at the Convocation of Canterbury in 1532 agreed to sign the Oath but only under threat of prosecution for praemunire and only after these words were added: "as far as the law of Christ allows".

This was considered to be the final Submission of the Clergy. Cardinal John Fisher and some other clergy refused to sign. Henry purged most clergy who supported the papal stance from senior positions in the church. More continued to refuse to sign the Oath of Supremacy and did not agree to support the annulment of Henry's marriage to Catherine. However, he did not openly reject the King's actions and kept his opinions private.

On 16 May 1532, More resigned from his role as Chancellor but remained in Henry's favour despite his refusal. His decision to resign was caused by the decision of the convocation of the English Church, which was under intense royal threat, on the day before.

== Debates on extent of prosecution of heretics ==
The English establishment initially regarded Protestants (and Anabaptists) as akin to the Lollards and Hussites whose heresies fed their sedition. (Note: The intertwining of sedition and heresy can be seen in Henry VIII's pronouncement about the Lutherans' heresy "tending principally and chiefly to the withdrawing of the obedience of the Church of Rome, and also of the governance, regyment and supreme dignity of Princes and all nobility." Luther's attacks on German princes were evidence of the seditious nature of his doctrine. Baker House, Seymour (December 2022). "Richard Rex, ed., Henry VIII and Martin Luther: The Second Controversy, 1525–1527". Moreana. 59 (2): 254–269. doi:10.3366/more.2022.0130. S2CID 254358434. Even 150 years later, "one of the assumptions that John Locke had to deal with in arguing for religious tolerance was that religious assemblies other than those sponsored by the established church invariably gave rise to sedition" Manning, Roger B. (1980). "The Origins of the Doctrine of Sedition". Albion. 12 (2): 99–121. doi:10.2307/4048812. JSTOR 4048812.) Ambassador to Charles V Cuthbert Tunstall called Lutheranism the "foster-child" of the Wycliffite heresy that had underpinned Lollardy.

Historian Richard Rex wrote:

Thomas More, as lord chancellor [1529–1532], was in effect the first port of call for those arrested in London on suspicion of heresy, and he took the initial decisions about whether to release them, where to imprison them, or to which bishop to send them. He can be connected with police or judicial proceedings against around forty suspected or convicted heretics in the years 1529–33. (Note: There were a succession of policies towards heretics, from the Wolsey/John Fisher approach of persuasion, the 1529–1531 William Warham approach of reform and counter-propaganda, to More's brief approach of capital punishment of key networkers, to the subsequent Tudor policy of torture and terror. See D'Alton, Craig (1 August 2004). "William Warham and English heresy policy after the fall of Wolsey". Historical Research. 77 (197): 337–357. doi:10.1111/j.1468-2281.2004.00213.x. p.345)

Even today, opinions on the extent and nature of More's prosecution of heretics remain varied. He is portrayed in A Man for All Seasons as an urbane hero of conscience, for example, and in Wolf Hall as a "mere dessicated [sic] fanatic."

=== Torture allegations ===
Torture was not officially legal in England, except in pre-trial discovery phase of kinds of extreme cases that the King had allowed, such as seditious heresy. It was regarded as unsafe for evidence, and was not an allowed punishment.

Stories emerged in More's lifetime regarding persecution of the Protestant heretics during his time as Lord Chancellor, and he denied them in detail in his Apologia (1533).

Many stories were later published by the 16th-century English Protestant historian John Foxe in his polemical Book of Martyrs. Foxe was instrumental in publicizing accusations of torture, alleging that More had often personally used violence or torture while interrogating heretics. Later Protestant authors such as Brian Moynahan and Michael Farris cite Foxe when repeating these allegations. Biographer Peter Ackroyd also lists claims from Foxe's Book of Martyrs and other post-Reformation sources that More "tied heretics to a tree in his Chelsea garden and whipped them", that "he watched as 'newe men' were put upon the rack in the Tower and tortured until they confessed", and that "he was personally responsible for the burning of several of the 'brethren' in Smithfield."

Historian John Guy commented that "such charges are unsupported by independent proof." (Note: "Serious analysis precludes the repetition of protestant stories that Sir Thomas flogged heretics against a tree in his garden at Chelsea. It must exclude, too, the accusations of illegal imprisonment made against More by John Field and Thomas Phillips. Much vaunted by J.A. Froude, such charges are unsupported by independent proof. More indeed answered them in his Apology with emphatic denial. None has ever been substantiated, and we may hope that they were all untrue." Guy, John; More, Thomas (1980). The public career of Sir Thomas More. Brighton, Sussex: Harvester Pr. ISBN 085527963X.) Modern historian Diarmaid MacCulloch finds no evidence that More was directly involved in torture. (Note: "[More] [...] turned to waging implacable war on enemies of the Church whom he could crush without inhibition. [...] He had a positive relish for burning heretics. [...] Claims [...] that he personally tortured heretics have no evidence to back them up. MacCulloch, Diarmaid (27 September 2018). Thomas Cromwell: a life. Penguin Books. pp. 160–62. ISBN 978-1-84614-429-5.) Richard Marius records a similar claim, which tells about James Bainham, and writes that "the story Foxe told of Bainham's whipping and racking at More's hands is universally doubted today". (Note: Marius suggests that the rumours of More's cruelty started with renegade priest John Constantine, who was arrested, betrayed Bayfield, and escaped from More's house to stay with a friend in Antwerp who he also later betrayed. p.404)

More himself denied these allegations:

Stories of a similar nature were current even in More's lifetime and he denied them forcefully. He admitted that he did imprison heretics in his house – 'theyr sure kepynge' (Note: I.e., "their sure-keeping") – he called it – but he utterly rejected claims of torture and whipping... 'as help me God.'

More instead claimed in his Apology (1533) that he only applied corporal punishment to two "heretics": a child servant in his household who was caned (the customary punishment for children at that time) for repeating a heresy regarding the Eucharist, and a "feeble-minded" man who was whipped for disrupting the mass by raising women's skirts over their heads at the moment of consecration. More claimed to have done this to prevent a lynching.

=== Executions ===
Burning at the stake was the standard punishment by the English state for obstinate or relapsed, major seditious or proselytizing heresy, and continued to be used by both Catholics and Protestants during the religious upheaval of the following decades. In England, following the Lollard uprisings, heresy had been linked to sedition (see De heretico comburendo and Suppression of Heresy Act 1414.)

Ackroyd and MacCulloch agree that More zealously approved of burning. Richard Marius maintained that in office More did everything in his power to bring about the extermination of heretics. Yet Catholic historian Eamon Duffy notes that "He never presided at a heresy trial (no layman could) and he never condemned anyone to death for their religious beliefs."

During More's chancellorship, six people were burned at the stake for heresy. They were Thomas Hitton, Thomas Bilney, Richard Bayfield, John Tewkesbury, Thomas Dusgate, and James Bainham. However, the court of the Star Chamber, of which More as Lord Chancellor was the presiding judge, could not impose the death sentence: it was a kind of appellate supreme court.

More took a personal interest in the three London cases:

- John Tewkesbury was a London leather seller found guilty by the Bishop of London John Stokesley of harbouring English translated New Testaments; he was sentenced to burning for refusing to recant. More declared: he "burned as there was neuer wretche I wene better worthy."
- Richard Bayfield was found distributing Tyndale's Bibles, and examined by Bishop Cuthbert Tunstall. More commented that he was "well and worthely burned".
- James Bainham was arrested on a warrant of Thomas More as Lord Chancellor and detained at his gatehouse. He was examined by Bishop John Stokesley, abjured, penalized and freed. He subsequently re-canted, and was re-arrested, tried and executed as a relapsed heretic.

Historian Brian Moynahan alleged that More influenced the eventual execution of William Tyndale in the Duchy of Brabant, as English agents had long pursued Tyndale. Historian Richard Rex argues that linking the execution to More was "bizarre". Moynahan named Henry Phillips, a student at the University of Louvain and follower of Bishop Stokesley, as the man More commissioned to befriend Tyndale and then betray him. However, the execution took place on 6 October 1536, sixteen months after More himself had been executed, and in a different jurisdiction.

=== Modern treatment ===
Modern commentators have been divided over More's character and actions.

Some biographers, including Peter Ackroyd, have taken a relatively tolerant (Note: Peter Ackroyd (1998). The Life of Thomas More. Chatto & Windus. p. 244. ISBN 1-85619-711-5. "(Chapter 22) [...] Already, in these early days of English heresy, he was thinking of the fire. It is a measure of his alarm at the erosion of the traditional order that he should, in this letter, compose a defence of scholastic theology—the same scholasticism which in his younger days he had treated with derision. This was no longer a time for questioning, or innovation, or uncertainty, of any kind. He blamed Luther for the Peasants' Revolt in Germany, and maintained that all its havoc and destruction were the direct result of Luther's challenge to the authority of the Church; under the pretext of 'libertas' Luther preached 'licentia' which had in turn led to rape, sacrilege, bloodshed, fire and ruin." (Online citation here)) or even positive (Note: Joanne Paul (2016). Thomas More. John Wiley & Sons. ISBN 978-0-7456-9220-3. "Princes were 'driven by necessity' by the 'importune malice of heretics raising rebellions' to set 'sorer and sorer punishments thereunto' (CTA, 956). In other words, the heretics had started it: 'the Catholic Church did never persecute heretics by any temporal pain or any secular power until the heretics began such violence themself' (CTA, 954). More had in mind violent conflicts on the continent, such as the German Peasants' War (1524–5) and the Münster Rebellion (1532–5)." (CTA=Confutation of Tyndale's Answer)) view of More's campaign against Protestantism by placing his actions within the turbulent religious climate of the time and the threat of deadly catastrophes such as the German Peasants' Revolt, which More blamed on Luther, (Note: "...civil chaos will surely follow" (691–93). This prediction seemed to come true very quickly, as More noted in his next polemical work, A dialogue Concerning Heresies. There he argued that the Peasants' Revolt in Germany (1525), the Lutheran mercenaries' sack of Rome (1527), and the growing unrest in England all stemmed from Luther's inflammatory teachings and especially the lure of false freedom (Wegemer 1996, p. 173).) as did many others, including Erasmus.

Others have been more critical, such as writer Richard Marius, an American scholar of the Reformation, believing that such persecutions were a betrayal of More's earlier humanist convictions, including More's zealous and well-documented advocacy of extermination for heretics. This supposed contradiction has been called "schizophrenic." He has been called a "zealous legalist [...] [with an] itchy finesse of cruelty".

Pope John Paul II honoured him by making More patron saint of statesmen and politicians in October 2000, stating: "It can be said that he demonstrated in a singular way the value of a moral conscience [...] even if, in his actions against heretics, he reflected the limits of the culture of his time".

Australian High Court judge and President of the International Commission of Jurists, Justice Michael Kirby has noted:

More's resignation as Lord Chancellor demonstrates also a recognition of the fact that, so long as he held office, he was obliged to conform to the King's law. It is often the fact that judges and lawyers must perform acts which they do not particularly like. In Utopia, for example, More had written that he believed capital punishment to be immoral, reprehensible and unjustifiable. Yet as Lord Chancellor and as councillor to the King, he certainly participated in sending hundreds of people to their death, a troubling thought. Doubtless he saw himself, as many judges before and since have done, as a mere instrument of the legal power of the State.

— "Thomas More, Martin Luther and the Judiciary today," speech to Thomas More Society, 1997

== Indictment, trial, and execution ==
In 1533, More refused to attend the coronation of Anne Boleyn as Queen of England. Technically, this was not an act of treason, as More had written to Henry seemingly acknowledging Anne's queenship and expressing his desire for the King's happiness and the new Queen's health. Despite this, his refusal to attend was widely interpreted as a snub against Anne, and Henry took action against him. Shortly thereafter, More was charged with accepting bribes, but the charges had to be dismissed for lack of any evidence.

In early 1534, More was accused by Thomas Cromwell of having given advice and counsel to the "Holy Maid of Kent," Elizabeth Barton, a nun who had prophesied that the King had ruined his soul and would come to a quick end for having divorced Queen Catherine. This was a month after Barton had confessed, which was possibly done under royal pressure, and was said to be concealment of treason. Though it was dangerous for anyone to have anything to do with Barton, More had met her and was impressed by her fervour. However, More was prudent and told her not to interfere with state matters. More was called before a committee of the Privy Council to answer these charges of treason and, after his respectful answers, the matter seemed to have been dropped.

On 13 April 1534, More was asked to appear before a commission and swear his allegiance to the parliamentary Act of Succession. (Note: In March 1534, the First Succession Act passed parliament, "investing Henry VIII with the power to "visit, redress, reform, correct or amend all errors, heresies and enormities;" to define faith; and to appoint bishops. This law also directed the monies which had previously been paid to Rome to the King's coffers. The Treason Act 1534 (26 Hen. 8. c. 13) passed in the same month among other things made it treasonable to deny the King's role as Supreme Head of the Church.' "St. Thomas More". Catholic Encyclopaedia.) More accepted Parliament's right to declare Anne Boleyn the legitimate Queen of England, though he refused "the spiritual validity of the King's second marriage" and, holding fast to the teaching of papal supremacy, he steadfastly refused to take the oath of supremacy of the Crown in the relationship between the kingdom and the church in England. More also publicly refused to uphold Henry's annulment from Catherine. John Fisher, Bishop of Rochester, refused the oath along with More. The oath reads in part:

By reason whereof the Bishop of Rome and See Apostolic, contrary to the great and inviolable grants of jurisdictions given by God immediately to emperors, kings and princes in succession to their heirs, hath presumed in times past to invest who should please them to inherit in other men's kingdoms and dominions, which thing we your most humble subjects, both spiritual and temporal, do most abhor and detest...

In addition to refusing to support the King's annulment or supremacy, More refused to sign the 1534 Oath of Succession confirming Anne's role as queen and the rights of their children to succession. More's fate was sealed. While he had no argument with the basic concept of succession as stated in the Act, the preamble of the Oath repudiated the authority of the Pope.

=== Indictment ===
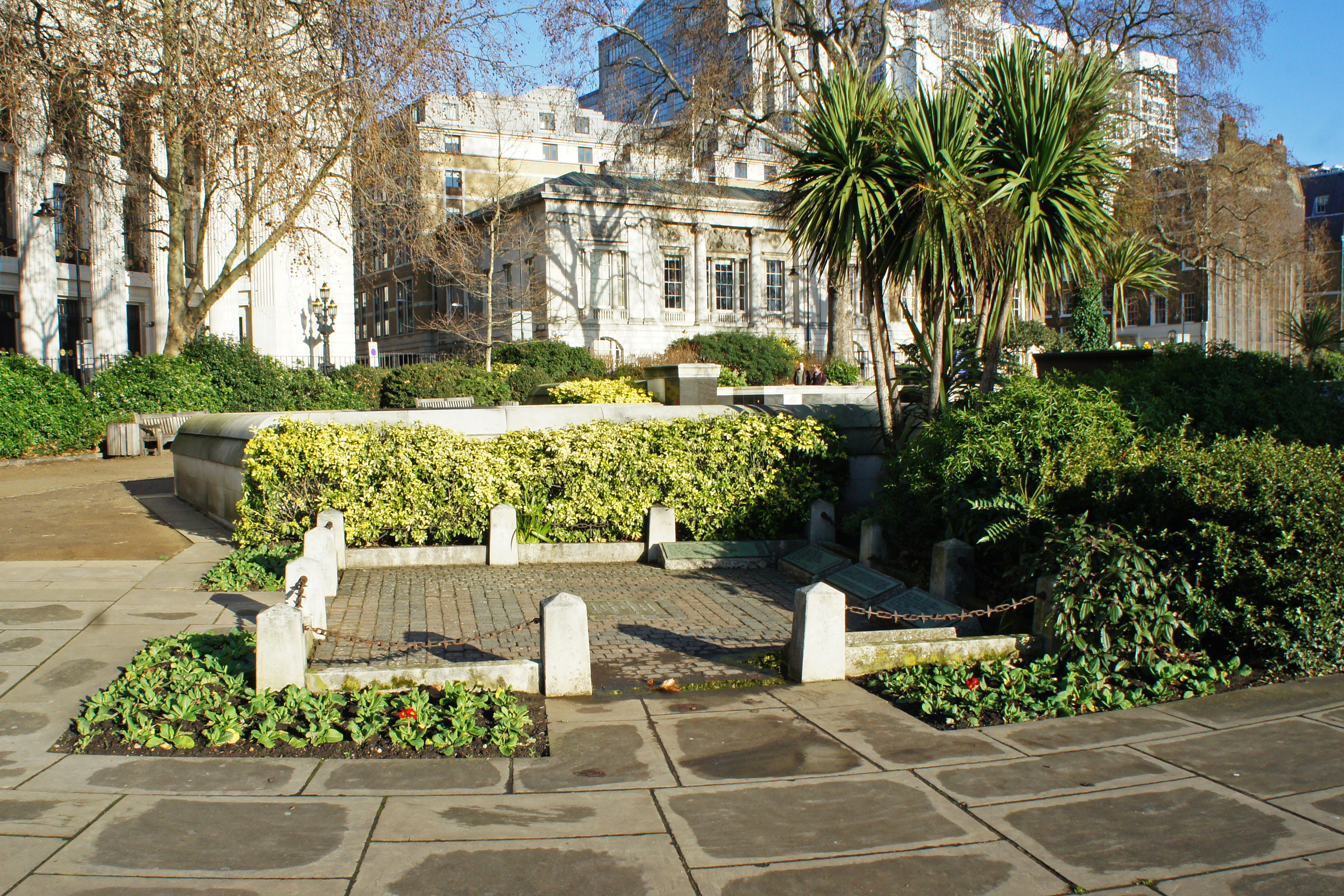
The site of the scaffold at Tower Hill just north of the Tower of London, where More was executed by decapitation

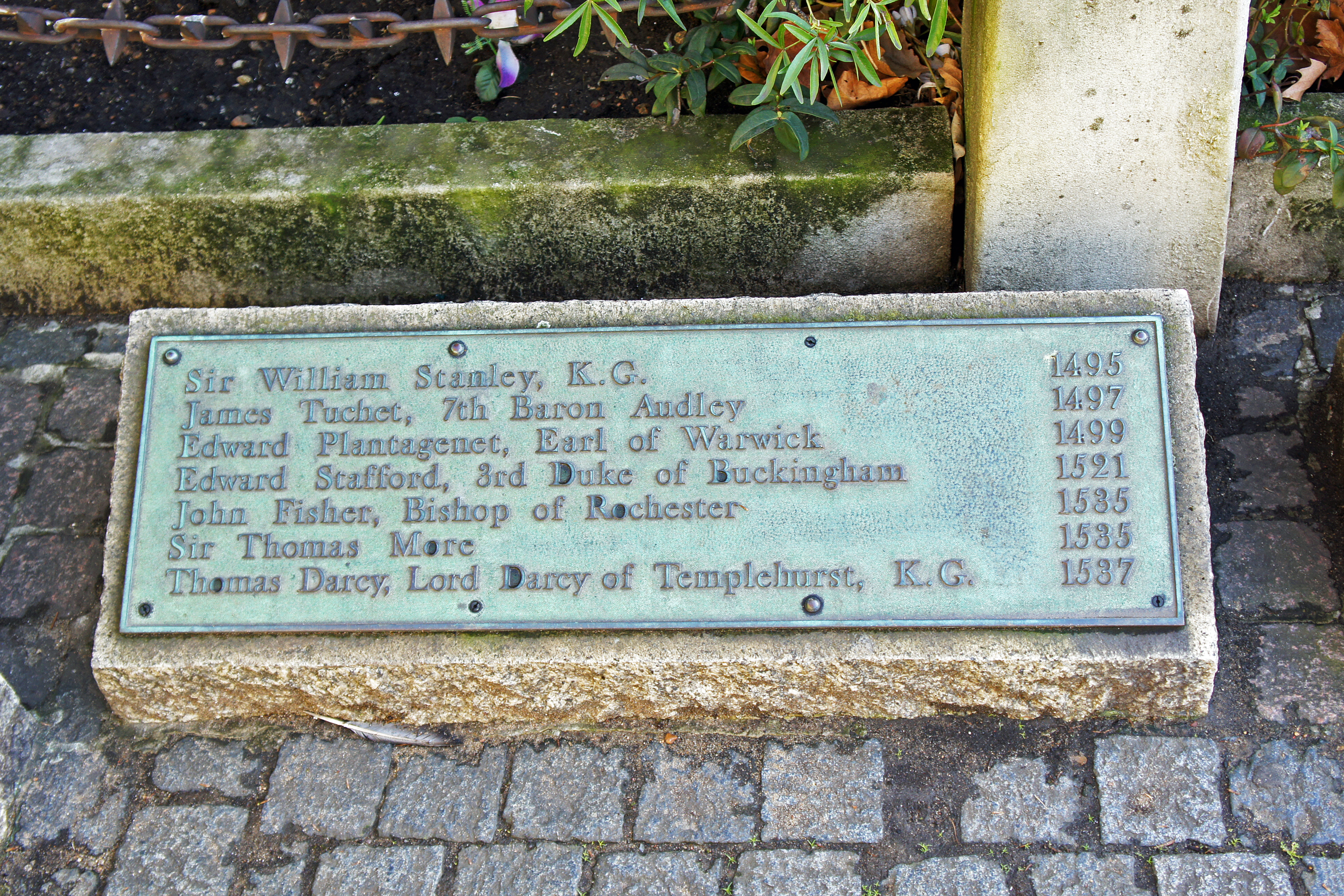
A commemorative plaque at the site of the ancient scaffold at Tower Hill, with Sir Thomas More listed among other notables executed at the site

More's enemies had enough evidence to have the King arrest him on a charge of treason. Four days later, Henry had More imprisoned in the Tower of London. There More prepared a devotional, Dialogue of Comfort against Tribulation. While More was imprisoned in the Tower, Thomas Cromwell made several visits, urging More to take the oath, which he continued to refuse.

In his unfinished History of the Passion, written in the Tower to his daughter Meg, he wrote of feeling favoured by God: "For methinketh God maketh me a wanton, and setteth me on his lap and dandleth me."

The charges of high treason related to More's violating the statutes as to the King's supremacy (malicious silence) and conspiring with Bishop John Fisher in this respect (malicious conspiracy) and, according to some sources, included asserting that Parliament did not have the right to proclaim the King's Supremacy over the English Church. One group of scholars believes that the judges dismissed the first two charges (malicious acts) and tried More only on the final one, but others strongly disagree.

Regardless of the specific charges, the indictment related to violation of the Treasons Act 1534 which declared it treason to speak against the King's Supremacy:

If any person or persons, after the first day of February next coming, do maliciously wish, will or desire, by words or writing, or by craft imagine, invent, practise, or attempt any bodily harm to be done or committed to the king's most royal person, the queen's, or their heirs apparent, or to deprive them or any of them of their dignity, title, or name of their royal estates [...] That then every such person and persons so offending [...] shall have and suffer such pains of death and other penalties, as is limited and accustomed in cases of high treason.

=== Trial ===
The trial was held on 1 July 1535, before a panel of judges that included the new Lord Chancellor Sir Thomas Audley, as well as Anne Boleyn's uncle Thomas Howard, 3rd Duke of Norfolk, her father Thomas Boleyn, and her brother George Boleyn. Norfolk offered More the chance of the King's "gracious pardon" should he "reform his [...] obstinate opinion". More responded that, although he had not taken the oath, he had never spoken out against it either and that his silence could be accepted as his "ratification and confirmation" of the new statutes.

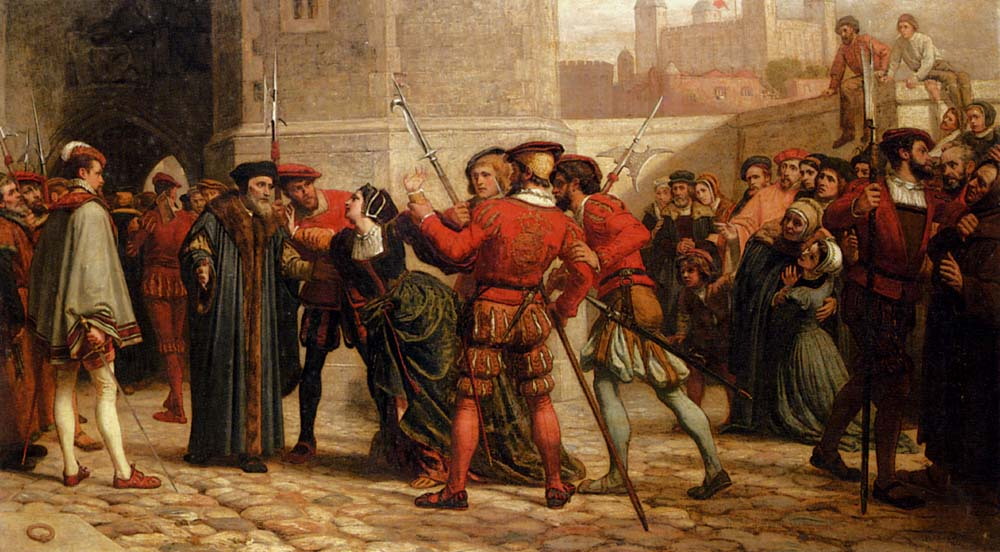
William Frederick Yeames, The meeting of Sir Thomas More with his daughter after his sentence of death, 1872

Thus More was relying upon legal precedent and the maxim qui tacet consentire videtur ("one who keeps silent seems to consent"), understanding that he could not be convicted as long as he did not explicitly deny that the King was Supreme Head of the Church, and he therefore refused to answer all questions regarding his opinions on the subject.

Thomas Cromwell, at the time the most powerful of the King's advisors, brought forth Solicitor General Richard Rich to testify that More had, in his presence, denied that the King was the legitimate head of the Church. This testimony was characterised by More as being extremely dubious. Witnesses Richard Southwell and Mr. Palmer (a servant to Southwell) were also present and both denied having heard the details of the reported conversation. As More himself pointed out:

Can it therefore seem likely to your Lordships, that I should in so weighty an Affair as this, act so unadvisedly, as to trust Mr. Rich, a Man I had always so mean an Opinion of, in reference to his Truth and Honesty, [...] that I should only impart to Mr. Rich the Secrets of my Conscience in respect to the King's Supremacy, the particular Secrets, and only Point about which I have been so long pressed to explain my self? which I never did, nor never would reveal; when the Act was once made, either to the King himself, or any of his Privy Councillors, as is well known to your Honours, who have been sent upon no other account at several times by his Majesty to me in the Tower. I refer it to your Judgments, my Lords, whether this can seem credible to any of your Lordships.

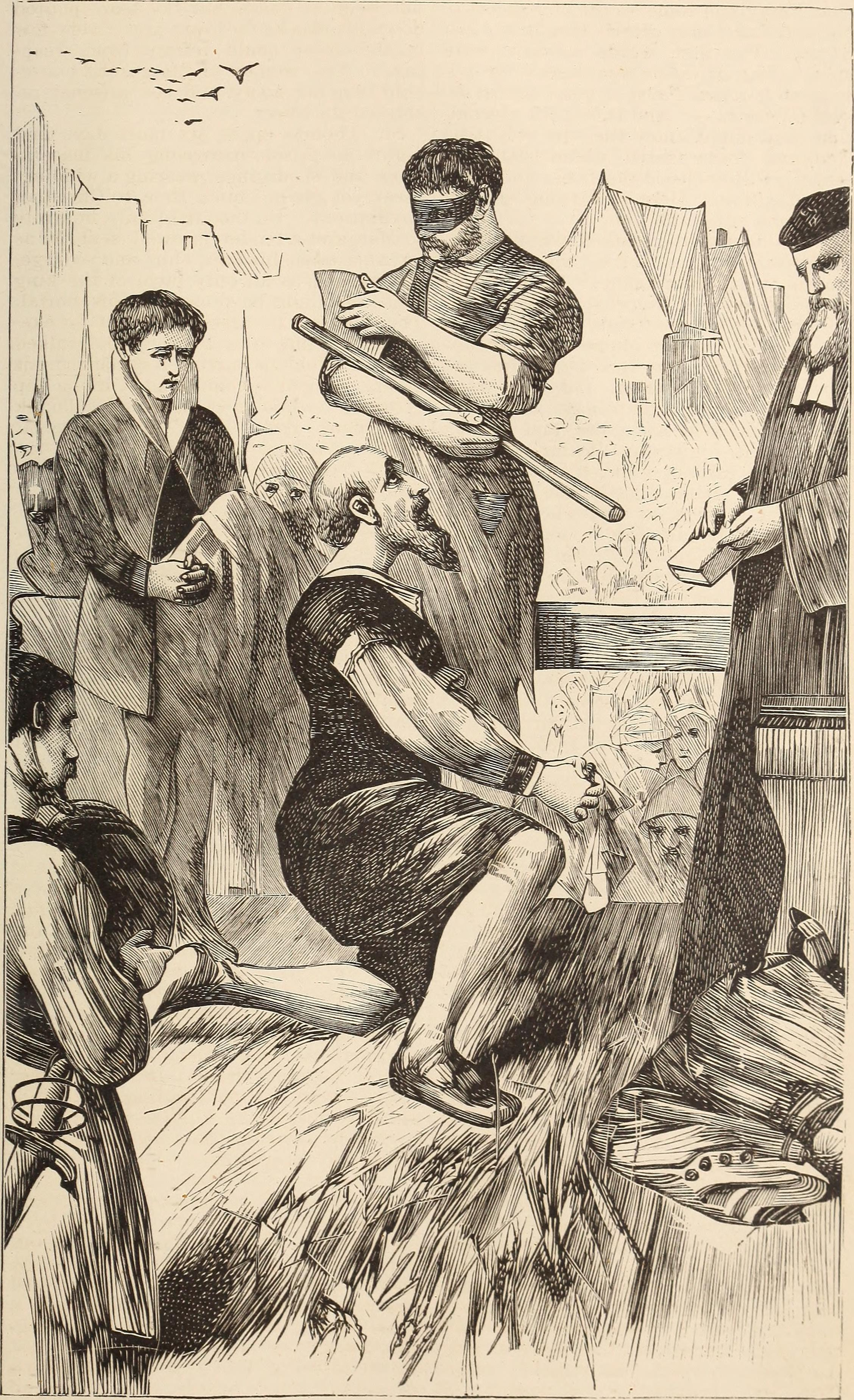
Beheading of Thomas More, 1870 illustration

The jury took only fifteen minutes to find More guilty.

After the jury's verdict was delivered and before his sentencing, More spoke freely of his belief that "no temporal man may be the head of the spirituality" (take over the role of the Pope). According to William Roper's account, More was pleading that the Statute of Supremacy was contrary to Magna Carta, to Church laws and to the laws of England, attempting to void the entire indictment against him. He was sentenced to be hanged, drawn, and quartered (the usual punishment for traitors who were not of the nobility), but the King commuted this to execution by decapitation.

=== Execution ===
The execution took place on 6 July 1535 at Tower Hill. Biographer Peter Ackroyd reports that family members were excluded from the event, but historian Jaime Goodrich describes how his daughters Margaret More Roper and Margaret Clement were present. When he came to mount the steps to the scaffold, its frame seeming so weak that it might collapse, More is widely quoted as saying (to one of the officials): "I pray you, master Lieutenant, see me safe up and [for] my coming down, let me shift for my self"; while on the scaffold he declared that he died "the king's good servant, and God's first." Author Scott Hahn notes that the misquoted "but God's first" is a line from Robert Bolt's stage play A Man For All Seasons, which differs from More's actual words. After More had finished reciting the Miserere while kneeling, the executioner reportedly begged his pardon, then More rose up, kissed him and forgave him.

=== Relics ===
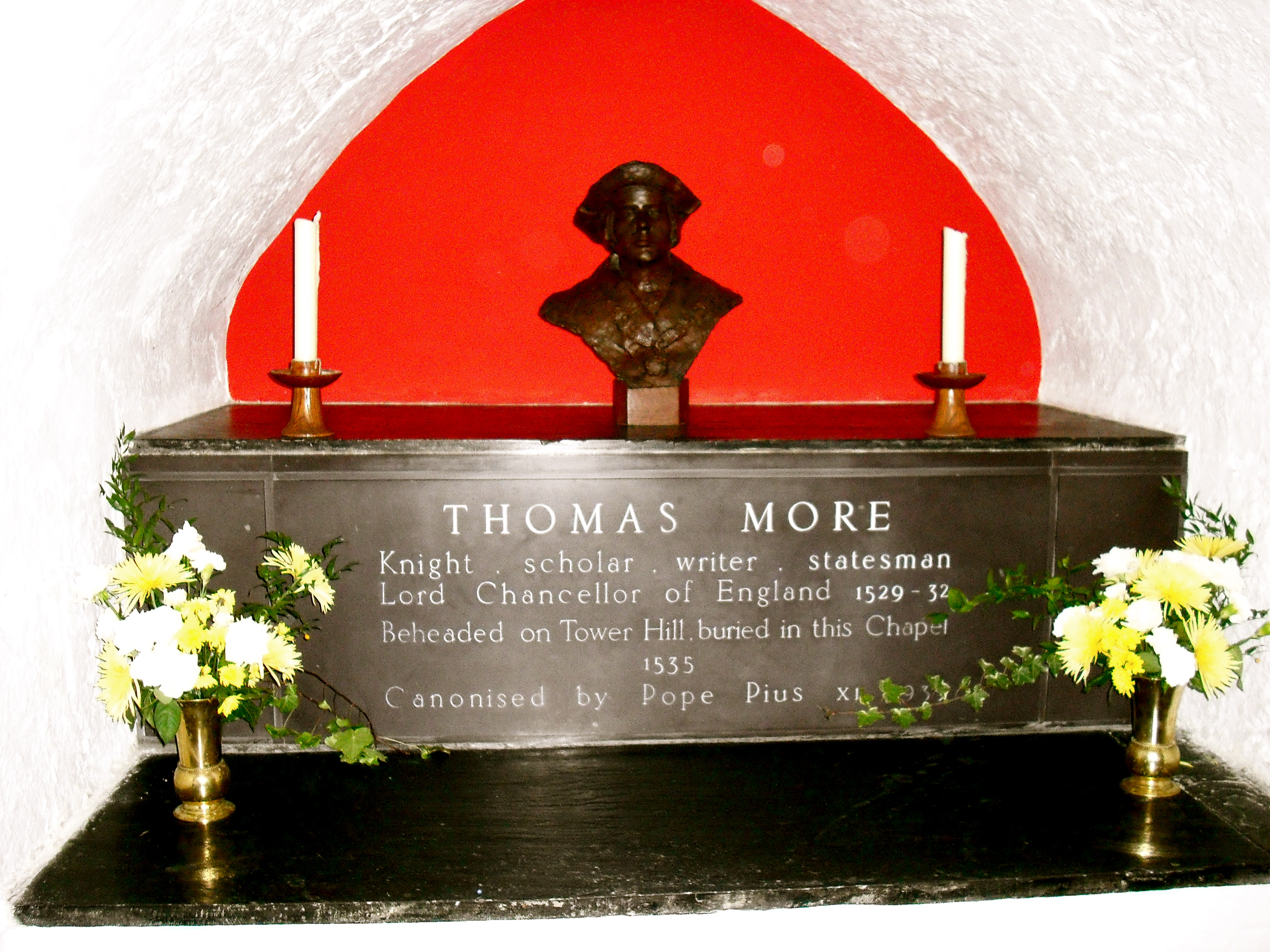
Thomas More's grave, Chapel Royal of St Peter ad Vincula

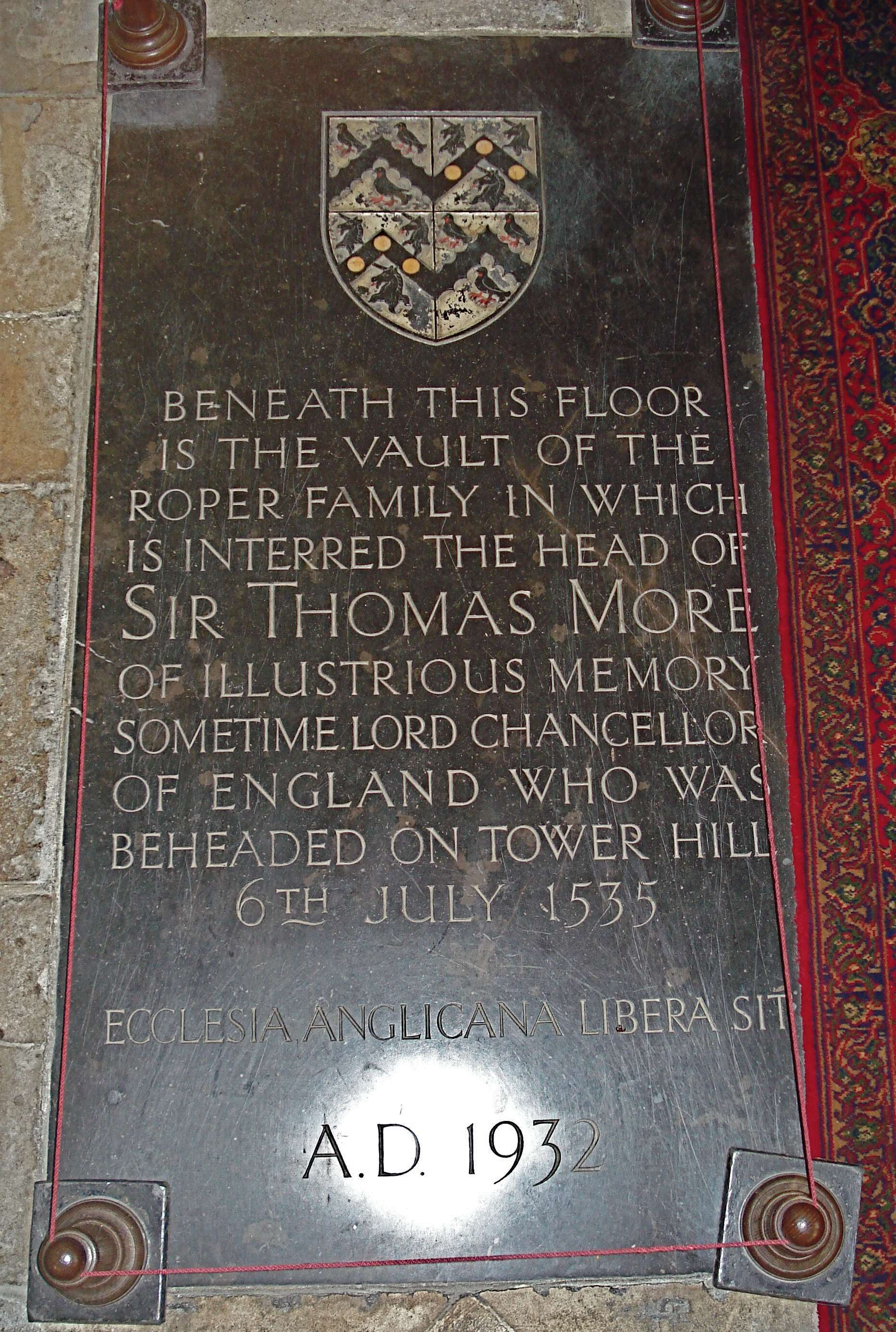
Sir Thomas More family's vault

Another comment More is believed to have made to the executioner is that his beard was completely innocent of any crime, and did not deserve the axe; he then positioned his beard so that it would not be harmed. More asked that his adopted daughter Margaret Clement (née Giggs) be given his headless corpse to bury. He was buried at the Tower of London, in the chapel of St Peter ad Vincula in an unmarked grave. His head was fixed upon a pike over London Bridge for a month, according to the normal custom for traitors.

More's daughter Margaret Roper (née More) later recovered the severed head. It is believed to rest in the Roper Vault of St Dunstan's Church, Canterbury, perhaps with the remains of Margaret and her husband's family. Some have claimed that the head is buried within the tomb erected for More in Chelsea Old Church.

Among other surviving relics is his hair shirt, presented for safe keeping by Margaret Clement. This was long in the custody of the community of Augustinian canonesses who until 1983 lived at the convent at Abbotskerswell Priory, Devon. Some sources, including one from 2004, claimed that the shirt, made of goat hair, was then kept at the Martyr's church on the Weld family's estate in Chideock, Dorset. It is now preserved at Buckfast Abbey, near Buckfastleigh in Devon.

=== Epitaph ===
In 1533, More wrote to Erasmus and included what he intended should be the epitaph on his family tomb:

Within this tomb Jane, wife of More, reclines;
This More for Alice and himself designs.
The first, dear object of my youthful vow,
Gave me three daughters and a son to know;

The next—ah! virtue in a stepdame rare!—
Nursed my sweet infants with a mother's care.
With both my years so happily have past,
Which most my love, I know not—first or last.

Oh! had religion destiny allowed,
How smoothly mixed had our three fortunes flowed!
But, be we in the tomb, in heaven allied,
So kinder death shall grant what life denied.

== Scholarly and literary work ==
=== History of King Richard III ===
Between 1512 and 1519 More worked on a History of King Richard III, which he never finished but which was published after his death. The History is a Renaissance biography, remarkable more for its literary skill and adherence to classical precepts than for its historical accuracy. Some consider it an attack on royal tyranny, rather than on Richard III himself or the House of York. More uses a more dramatic writing style than had been typical in medieval chronicles; Richard III is limned as an outstanding, archetypal tyrant—however, More was only seven years old when Richard was killed at the Battle of Bosworth in 1485, so he had no first-hand knowledge of him.

The History of King Richard III was written and published in both English and Latin, each written separately, and with information deleted from the Latin edition to suit a European readership. It greatly influenced William Shakespeare's play Richard III. Modern historians attribute the unflattering portraits of Richard III in both works to both authors' allegiance to the reigning Tudor dynasty that wrested the throne from Richard III in the Wars of the Roses. According to Caroline Barron, Archbishop John Morton, in whose household More had served as a page, had joined the 1483 Buckingham rebellion against Richard III, and Morton was probably one of those who influenced More's hostility towards the defeated king. Clements Markham asserts that the actual author of the chronicle was, in large part, Archbishop Morton himself and that More was simply copying, or perhaps translating, Morton's original material.

=== Utopia ===
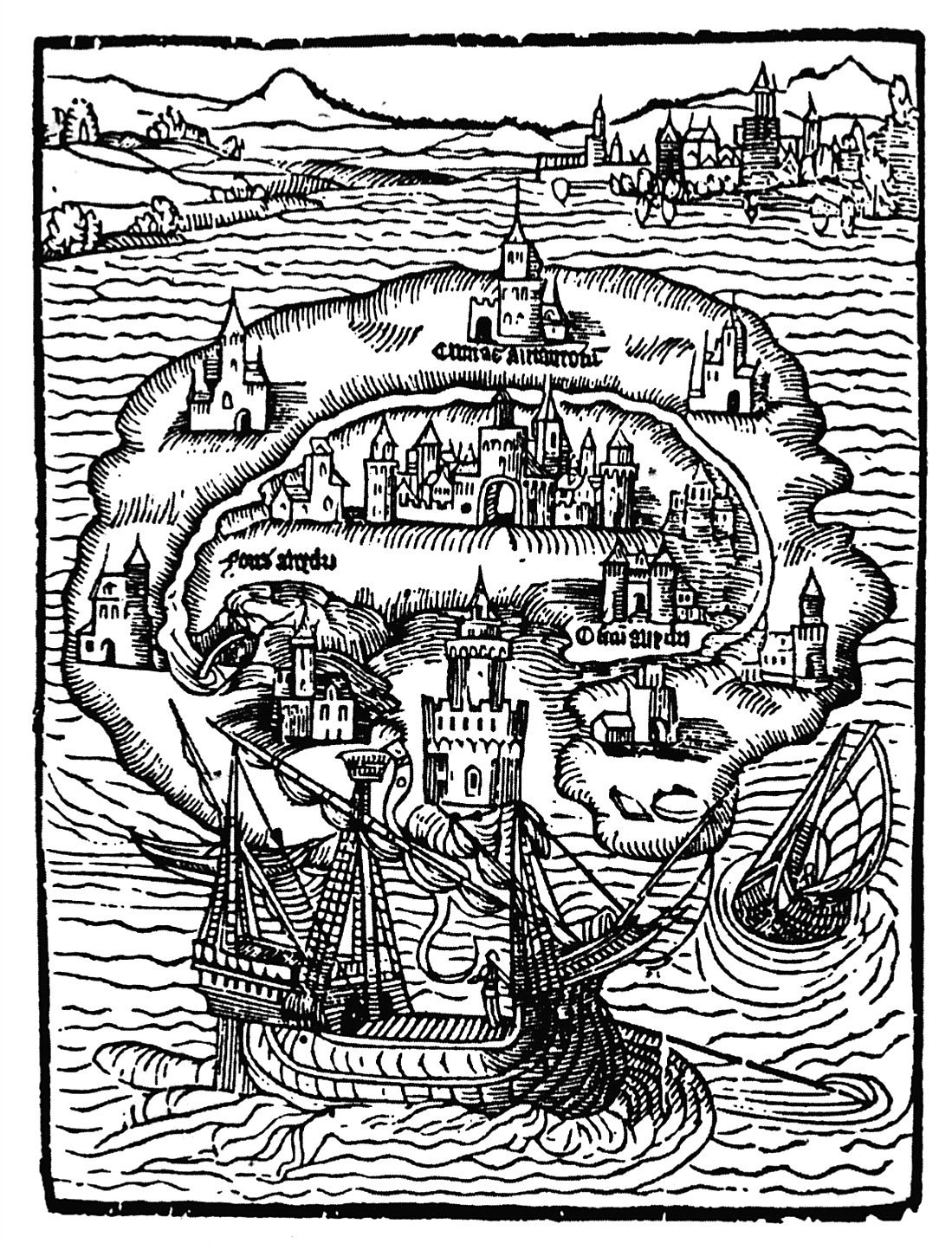
A 1516 illustration of Utopia

More's best known and most controversial work, Utopia, is a frame narrative written in Latin. More completed the book, and theologian Erasmus published it in Leuven in 1516. It was only translated into English and published in his native land in 1551 (16 years after his execution), and the 1684 translation became the most commonly cited. More (who is also a character in the book) and the narrator/traveller, Raphael Hythlodaeus (whose name alludes both to the healer archangel Raphael, and 'speaker of nonsense', the surname's Greek meaning), discuss modern ills in Antwerp, as well as describe the political arrangements of the imaginary island country of Utopia (a Greek pun on 'ou-topos' [no place] and 'eu-topos' [good place]) among themselves as well as to Pieter Gillis and Hieronymus van Busleyden. Utopia's original edition included a symmetrical "Utopian alphabet" omitted by later editions, but which may have been an early attempt or precursor of shorthand.

Utopia is structured into two parts, both with much irony: Book I has conversations between friends on various European political issues: the treatment of criminals, the enclosure movement, etc.; Book II is a remembered discourse by Raphael Hythlodaeus on his supposed travels, in which the earlier issues are revisited in fantastical but concrete forms that has been called mythical idealism. For example, the proposition in the Book I "no republic can be prosperous or justly governed where there is private property and money is the measure of everything."

Utopia contrasts the contentious social life of European states with the perfectly orderly, reasonable social arrangements of Utopia and its environs (Tallstoria, Nolandia, and Aircastle). In Utopia, there are no lawyers because of the laws' simplicity and because social gatherings are in public view (encouraging participants to behave well), communal ownership supplants private property, men and women are educated alike, and there is almost complete religious toleration (except for atheists, who are allowed but despised).

More may have used monastic communalism as his model, although other concepts he presents such as legalising euthanasia remain far outside Church doctrine. Hythlodaeus asserts that a man who refuses to believe in a god or an afterlife could never be trusted, because he would not acknowledge any authority or principle outside himself. A scholar has suggested that More is most interested in the type of citizen Utopia produces.

Some take the novel's principal message to be the social need for order and discipline rather than liberty. Ironically, Hythlodaeus, who believes philosophers should not get involved in politics, addresses More's ultimate conflict between his humanistic beliefs and courtly duties as the King's servant, pointing out that one day those morals will come into conflict with the political reality.

Utopia gave rise to a literary genre, Utopian and dystopian fiction, which features ideal societies or perfect cities, or their opposite. Works influenced by Utopia included New Atlantis by Francis Bacon, Erewhon by Samuel Butler, and Candide by Voltaire. Although Utopianism combined classical concepts of perfect societies (Plato and Aristotle) with Roman rhetorical finesse (cf. Cicero, Quintilian, epideictic oratory), the Renaissance genre continued into the Age of Enlightenment and survives in modern science fiction.

=== Epigrams ===
Erasmus in Basel collected and had published a book of More's Latin epigrams: the final 1523 edition Epigrammata contained 253 of the short poems, described by historian Damian Grace as "Political theory in a poetic idiom."

In the 1510s, More had the habit of composing these formal paragraphs, variously serious or facetious, for correspondents. Some show a concern about royal tyranny and may suggest a preference for Roman republican government.

=== Religious polemics ===
In 1520 the reformer Martin Luther published three works in quick succession: An Appeal to the Christian Nobility of the German Nation (Aug.), Concerning the Babylonish Captivity of the Church (Oct.), and On the Liberty of a Christian Man (Nov.). In these books, Luther set out his doctrine of salvation through faith alone, rejected certain Catholic practices, and attacked abuses and excesses within the Catholic Church. In 1521, Henry VIII formally responded to Luther's criticisms with the Assertio, written with More's assistance. Pope Leo X rewarded the English king with the title "Fidei defensor" ("Defender of the Faith") for his work combating Luther's heresies.

Martin Luther then attacked Henry VIII in print, calling him a "pig, dolt, and liar". At the King's request, More composed a rebuttal: the Responsio ad Lutherum was published at the end of 1523. In the Responsio, More defended papal supremacy, the sacraments, and other Church traditions. More, though considered "a much steadier personality", described Luther as an "ape", a "drunkard", and a "lousy little friar" amongst other epithets. Writing under the pseudonym of Gulielmus Rosseus, More tells Luther that:

for as long as your reverend paternity will be determined to tell these shameless lies, others will be permitted, on behalf of his English majesty, to throw back into your paternity's shitty mouth, truly the shit-pool of all shit, all the muck and shit which your damnable rottenness has vomited up, and to empty out all the sewers and privies onto your crown divested of the dignity of the priestly crown, against which no less than the kingly crown you have determined to play the buffoon.

His saying is followed with a kind of apology to his readers, while Luther possibly never apologized for his sayings. Stephen Greenblatt argues, "More speaks for his ruler and in his opponent's idiom; Luther speaks for himself, and his scatological imagery far exceeds in quantity, intensity, and inventiveness anything that More could muster. If for More scatology normally expresses a communal disapproval, for Luther, it expresses a deep personal rage."

Confronting Luther confirmed More's theological conservatism, and he subsequently avoided any hint of criticism of Church authority. In 1528, More published another religious polemic, A Dialogue Concerning Heresies, that asserted the Catholic Church was the one true church, established by Christ and the Apostles, and affirmed the validity of its authority, traditions and practices. In 1529, the circulation of Simon Fish's Supplication for the Beggars prompted More to respond with the Supplycatyon of Soulys.

In 1531, a year after More's father died, William Tyndale published An Answer unto Sir Thomas More's Dialogue in response to More's Dialogue Concerning Heresies. More responded with a half million words: the Confutation of Tyndale's Answer. The Confutation is an imaginary dialogue between More and Tyndale, with More addressing each of Tyndale's criticisms of Catholic rites and doctrines. More, who valued structure, tradition and order in society as safeguards against tyranny and error, vehemently believed that Lutheranism and the Protestant Reformation in general were dangerous, not only to the Catholic faith but to the stability of society as a whole.

=== Correspondence ===
Most major humanists were prolific letter writers, and Thomas More was no exception. As in the case of his friend Erasmus of Rotterdam, however, only a small portion of his correspondence (about 280 letters) survived. These include everything from personal letters to official government correspondence (mostly in English), letters to fellow humanist scholars (in Latin), several epistolary tracts, verse epistles, prefatory letters (some fictional) to several of More's own works, letters to More's children and their tutors (in Latin), and the so-called "prison-letters" (in English) which he exchanged with his oldest daughter Margaret while he was imprisoned in the Tower of London awaiting execution. More also engaged in controversies, most notably with the French poet Germain de Brie, which culminated in the publication of de Brie's Antimorus (1519). Erasmus intervened, however, and ended the dispute.

More also wrote about more spiritual matters. They include: A Treatise on the Passion (a.k.a. Treatise on the Passion of Christ), A Treatise to Receive the Blessed Body (a.k.a. Holy Body Treaty), and De Tristitia Christi (a.k.a. The Agony of Christ). More handwrote the last in the Tower of London while awaiting his execution. This last manuscript, saved from the confiscation decreed by Henry VIII, passed by the will of his daughter Margaret to Spanish hands through Fray Pedro de Soto, dominican confessor of the count of Oropesa ambassador of the Emperor Charles V, that presented to saint Juan de Ribera archbishop of Valencia at that time and founder of Real Colegio Seminario del Corpus Christi and its museum where it remains in the collection.

== Veneration ==
Saint Thomas More
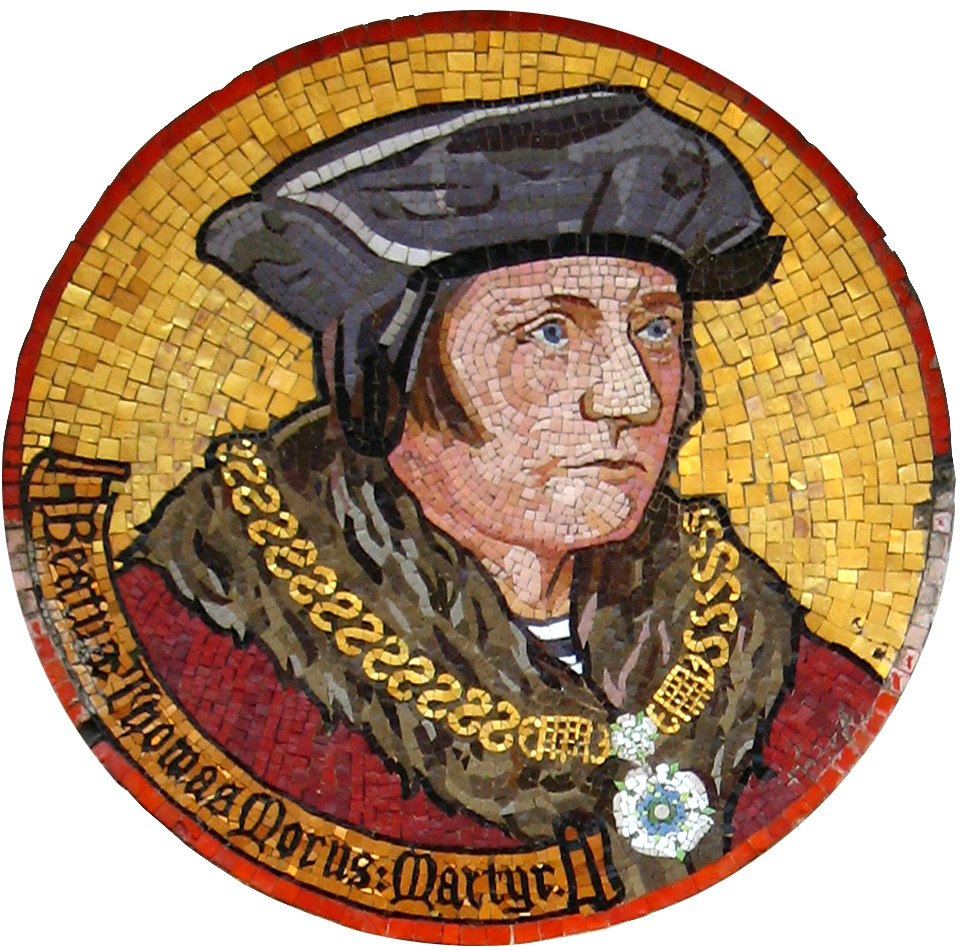
- Portrait of Saint Thomas More, executed on Tower Hill (London) in 1535, apparently based on the Holbein portrait

Martyr
- Venerated in: Catholic Church; Anglican Communion
- Beatified: 29 December 1886, Florence, Kingdom of Italy by Pope Leo XIII
- Canonized: 19 May 1935, Vatican City by Pope Pius XI
- Major shrine: Church of St Peter ad Vincula, London, England
- Feast: 22 June (Catholic Church); 6 July (Church of England); 9 July (Catholic Extraordinary Form)
- Attributes: Robe of the Chancellor and wearing the Collar of Esses; axe
- Patronage: Statesmen and politicians; lawyers; Ateneo de Manila Law School; Diocese of Arlington; Diocese of Pensacola-Tallahassee; Kerala Catholic Youth Movement; University of Malta; University of Santo Tomas Faculty of Arts and Letters

=== Catholic Church ===
Pope Leo XIII beatified Thomas More, John Fisher, and fifty-two other English Martyrs on 29 December 1886. Pius XI canonised More and Fisher on 19 May 1935 pre-eminently for their martyrdom, saying:

They were, so to speak, the leaders and chieftains of that illustrious band of men who, from all classes of the people and from every part of Great Britain, resisted the new errors with unflinching spirit, and in shedding their blood, testified their loyal devotedness to the Holy See.

— Pope Pius XI, Homily at the Canonization of Thomas More

The British press greeted the 1935 canonisation ceremony, which Parliament and universities officially boycotted, with a "minimal and hostile" reception.

More's feast day was established as 9 July. Since 1970 the General Roman Calendar has celebrated More with St John Fisher on 22 June (the date of Fisher's execution). On 31 October 2000 Pope John Paul II declared More "the heavenly Patron of Statesmen and Politicians". More is the patron of the German Catholic youth organisation Katholische Junge Gemeinde.

=== Anglican Communion ===
In 1980, despite their staunch opposition to the English Reformation, More and Fisher were added as martyrs of the reformation to the Church of England's calendar of "Saints and Heroes of the Christian Church", to be commemorated every 6 July (the date of More's execution) as "Thomas More, scholar, and John Fisher, Bishop of Rochester, Reformation Martyrs, 1535". The annual remembrance of 6 July is recognised by all Anglican Churches in communion with Canterbury, including Australia, Brazil, Canada and South Africa.

In an essay examining the events around the addition to the Anglican calendar, scholar Bill Sheils links the reasoning for More's recognition to a "long-standing tradition hinted at in Rose Macaulay's ironic debating point of 1935 about More's status as an 'unschismed Anglican', a tradition also recalled in the annual memorial lecture held at St. Dunstan's Church in Canterbury, where More's head is said to be buried." Sheils also noted the influence of the 1960s play and film A Man for All Seasons, which gave More a "reputation as a defender of the right of conscience". Thanks to the play's depiction, this "brought his life to a broader and more popular audience" with the film "extending its impact worldwide following the Oscar triumphs". Around this time the atheist Oxford historian and intellectual Hugh Trevor-Roper held More up as "the first great Englishman whom we feel that we know, the most saintly of Humanists...the universal man of our cool northern Renaissance." In 1978, the quincentenary of More's birth, Trevor-Roper wrote an essay putting More in the Renaissance Platonist tradition, claiming his reputation was "quite independent of his Catholicism." Only later did a more critical view arise in academia, led by Professor Sir Geoffrey Elton, which "challenged More's reputation for saintliness by focusing on his dealings with heretics, the ferocity of which, in fairness to him, More did not deny. In this research, More's role as a prosecutor, or persecutor, of dissidents has been at the centre of the debate."

== Legacy ==
The steadfastness and courage with which More maintained his religious convictions, and his dignity during his imprisonment, trial, and execution, contributed much to More's posthumous reputation, particularly among Roman Catholics. His friend Erasmus defended More's character as "more pure than any snow" and described his genius as "such as England never had and never again will have." Upon learning of More's execution, Emperor Charles V said: "Had we been master of such a servant, we would rather have lost the best city of our dominions than such a worthy councillor."

G. K. Chesterton, a Roman Catholic convert from the Church of England, predicted More "may come to be counted the greatest Englishman, or at least the greatest historical character in English history." He wrote "the mind of More was like a diamond that a tyrant threw away into a ditch, because he could not break it."

Historian Hugh Trevor-Roper called More "the first great Englishman whom we feel that we know, the most saintly of humanists, the most human of saints, the universal man of our cool northern renaissance."

Jonathan Swift, an Anglican, wrote that More was "a person of the greatest virtue this kingdom ever produced". Some consider this quote to be of Samuel Johnson, although it is not found in Johnson's writings. Swift put More in the company of Socrates, Brutus, Epaminondas and Junius.

The metaphysical poet John Donne, also honoured in their calendar by Anglicans, was More's great-great-nephew.

US Senator Eugene McCarthy had a portrait of More in his office. Marxist theoreticians such as Karl Kautsky considered More's Utopia a critique of economic and social exploitation in pre-modern Europe and More is claimed to have influenced the development of socialist ideas.

In 1963, Moreana, an academic journal focusing on analysis of More and his writings, was founded.

In 2002, More was placed at number 37 in the BBC's poll of the 100 Greatest Britons.

=== Legal ===
More debated the lawyer and pamphleteer Christopher St. Germain through various books: while agreeing on various issues on equity, More disagreed with secret witnesses, the admissibility of hearsay, and found St Germain's criticism of religious courts superficial or ignorant. More and St Germain's views on equity owed in part to the 15th-century humanist theologian, Jean Gerson, who taught that consideration of the individual circumstances should be the norm, not the exception.

Before More, English Lord Chancellors tended to be clerics (with a role as Keeper of the King's Conscience); from More on, they tended to be lawyers.

A 1999 poll of legal British professionals nominated More as the person who most embodies the virtues of the law needed at the close of the millennium. The virtues were More's views on the primacy of conscience and his role in the practical establishment of the principle of equity in English secular law through the Court of Chancery.

=== In literature and popular culture ===
William Roper's biography of More (his father-in-law) was one of the first biographies in Modern English.

Sir Thomas More is a play written circa 1592 in collaboration between Henry Chettle, Anthony Munday, William Shakespeare, and others, or with multiple script-doctors in view of the dangerous topic. In it, More is portrayed as a wise and honest statesman. The original manuscript has survived as a handwritten text that shows many revisions by its several authors, as well as the censorious influence of Edmund Tylney, Master of the Revels in the government of Queen Elizabeth I. The script has since been published and has had several productions. One of the verses in the manuscript in Shakespeare's hand has a small soliloquy on More that includes:

... But More, the more that thou hast
Either of honour, office, wealth, and calling,
Which might accite thee to embrace and hug them,
The more do thou e'en serpent's natures think them:
Fear their gay skins, with thought of their stings,...

In Europe in the two centuries after his death, there were at least 50 Neo-Latin school plays written about More, performed at Jesuit schools.

In 1941, the 20th-century British author Elizabeth Goudge (1900–1984) wrote a short story, "The King's Servant", based on the last few years of Thomas More's life, seen through his family, and especially his adopted daughter, Anne Cresacre More.

The 20th-century agnostic playwright Robert Bolt portrayed Thomas More as the tragic hero of his 1960 play A Man for All Seasons.

More is a man of an angel's wit, and singular learning. I know not his fellow. For where is the man of that gentleness, lowliness and affability? And, as time requireth, a man of marvelous mirth and pastimes, and sometime of as sad gravity. A man for all seasons.

This passage is derived from an exercise in Robert Whittington's 1520 Latin grammar Vulgaria (which may have some provenance from vir omnium horarum — "man for all hours" — in Erasmus's dedication to More of his 1511 essay Moriae Encomium (Note: Erasmus had set the precedent of using sweetly extravagant praise of More such as "More is inscribed in my heart in letters that no injurious time can erode" for Latin grammatical examples in his 1512 De copia.)) that called the student to translate:

Moore is a man of an aungel's wyt and synglar lernyng. He is a man of many excellent vertues (yf I shold say as it is) I knowe not his felowe. For where is the man (in whome is so many godly vertues) of y^{t} gentylnes, lowlynes and affabylyte? And, as tyme requyreth, a man of merveylous myrth and pastymes, and somtyme of as sad gravyte, as who say: a man for all seasons.

In 1966, the play A Man for All Seasons was adapted into a film with the same title. It was directed by Fred Zinnemann and adapted for the screen by the playwright. It stars Paul Scofield, a noted British actor, who said that the part of Sir Thomas More was "the most difficult part I played." The film won the Academy Award for Best Picture and Scofield won the Best Actor Oscar. In 1988 Charlton Heston starred in and directed a made-for-television film that restored the character of "the common man" that had been cut from the 1966 film.

In the 1969 film Anne of the Thousand Days, More is portrayed by actor William Squire.

In the 1972 BBC TV series Henry VIII and his Six Wives More was played by Michael Goodliffe.

Catholic science fiction writer R. A. Lafferty wrote his novel Past Master as a modern counterpart to More's Utopia, which he saw as a satire. In this novel, Thomas More travels through time to the year 2535, where he is made king of the world "Astrobe", only to be beheaded after ruling for a mere nine days. One character compares More favourably to almost every other major historical figure: "He had one completely honest moment right at the end. I cannot think of anyone else who ever had one."

Karl Zuchardt's novel Stirb du Narr! ("Die you fool!"), about More's struggle with King Henry, portrays More as an idealist bound to fail in the power struggle with a ruthless ruler and an unjust world.

In her 2009 novel Wolf Hall, its 2012 sequel Bring Up the Bodies, and the final book of the trilogy, her 2020 The Mirror & the Light, the novelist Hilary Mantel portrays More (from the perspective of a sympathetically portrayed Thomas Cromwell) as an unsympathetic persecutor of Protestants and an ally of the Habsburg empire. The historical accuracy of the books' portrayal of major figures has been questioned by academics.

Literary critic James Wood in his book The Broken Estate, a collection of essays, is critical of More and refers to him as "cruel in punishment, evasive in argument, lusty for power, and repressive in politics".

Aaron S. Zelman's non-fiction book The State Versus the People includes a comparison of Utopia with Plato's Republic. Zelman is undecided as to whether More was being ironic in his book or was genuinely advocating a police state. Zelman comments, "More is the only Christian saint to be honoured with a statue at the Kremlin." By this Zelman implies that Utopia influenced Vladimir Lenin's Bolsheviks, despite their brutal repression of religion.

Other biographers, such as Peter Ackroyd, have offered a more sympathetic picture of More as both a sophisticated philosopher and man of letters, as well as a zealous Catholic who believed in the authority of the Holy See over Christendom.

The protagonist of Walker Percy's novels Love in the Ruins and The Thanatos Syndrome, is "Dr Thomas More", a reluctant Catholic and descendant of More.

More is the focus of the Al Stewart song "A Man For All Seasons" from the 1978 album Time Passages, and of the Far song "Sir", featured on the limited editions and 2008 re-release of their 1994 album Quick. In addition, the song "So Says I" by indie rock outfit The Shins alludes to the socialist interpretation of More's Utopia.

Jeremy Northam depicts More in the television series The Tudors as a peaceful man, as well as a devout Roman Catholic and loving family patriarch.

In David Starkey's 2009 documentary series Henry VIII: The Mind of a Tyrant, More is depicted by Ryan Kiggell.

More is depicted by Andrew Buchan in the television series The Spanish Princess.

From 1968 to 2007 the University of San Francisco's Gleeson Library Associates awarded the annual Sir Thomas More Medal for Book Collecting to private book collectors of note, including Elmer Belt, Otto Schaefer, Albert Sperisen, John S. Mayfield and Lord Wardington.

In the 2024 video game Metaphor: ReFantazio, the narrative focuses on a book depicting a fictional utopia written by a character named More.

=== Communism, socialism and anti-communism ===
Having been praised "as a Communist hero by Karl Marx, Friedrich Engels, and Karl Kautsky" because of the Communist attitude to property in his Utopia, under Soviet Communism the name of Thomas More was in ninth position from the top of Moscow's Stele of Freedom (also known as the Obelisk of Revolutionary Thinkers), as one of the most influential thinkers "who promoted the liberation of humankind from oppression, arbitrariness, and exploitation." This monument was erected in 1918 in Aleksandrovsky Garden near the Kremlin at Lenin's suggestion.

The Great Soviet Encyclopedia's English translation (1979) described More as "the founder of Utopian socialism", the first person "to describe a society in which private property ... had been abolished" (a society in which the family was "a cell for the communist way of life"), and a thinker who "did not believe that the ideal society would be achieved through revolution", but who "greatly influenced reformers of subsequent centuries, especially Morelly, G. Babeuf, Saint-Simon, C. Fourier, E. Cabet, and other representatives of Utopian socialism."

Utopia also inspired socialists such as William Morris.

Many see More's communism or socialism as purely satirical. In 1888, while praising More's communism, Karl Kautsky pointed out that "perplexed" historians and economists often saw the name Utopia (which means "no place") as "a subtle hint by More that he himself regarded his communism as an impracticable dream".

Aleksandr Solzhenitsyn, the Russian Nobel Prize-winning, anti-Communist author of The Gulag Archipelago, argued that Soviet communism needed enslavement and forced labour to survive, and that this had been " ...foreseen as far back as Thomas More, the great-grandfather of socialism, in his Utopia".

In 2008, More was portrayed on stage in Hong Kong as an allegorical symbol of the pan-democracy camp resisting the Chinese Communist Party in a translated and modified version of Robert Bolt's play A Man for All Seasons.

== Historic sites ==
=== Westminster Hall ===
A plaque in the middle of the floor of London's Westminster Hall commemorates More's trial for treason and condemnation to execution in that original part of the Palace of Westminster. The building, which houses Parliament, would have been well known to More, who served several terms as a member and became Speaker of the House of Commons before his appointment as England's Lord Chancellor.

=== Beaufort House ===
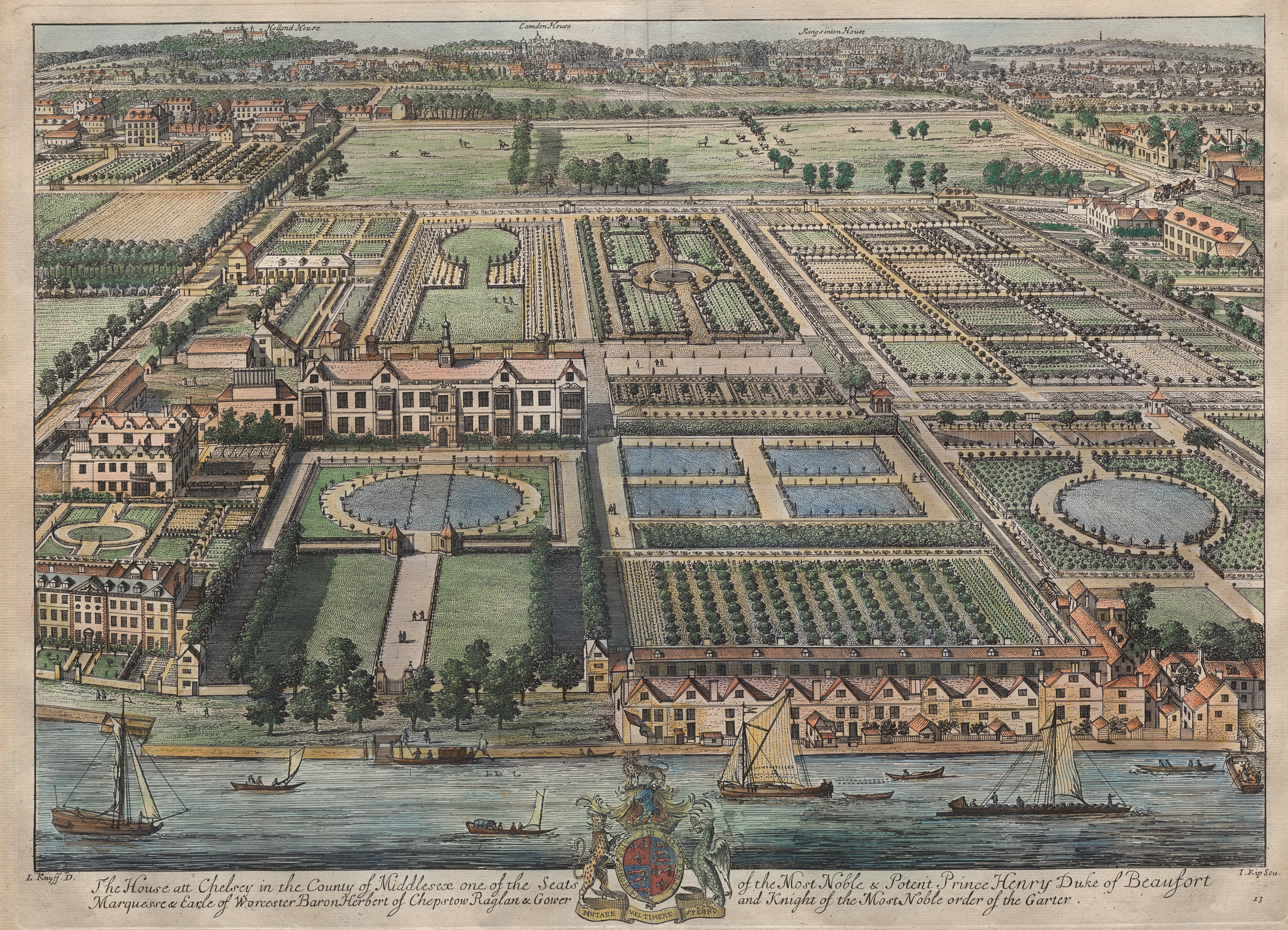
Beaufort House next to the Thames, c. 1707

As More's royal duties frequently required his attendance at the King's Thames-side palaces in both Richmond and Greenwich, it was convenient to select a riverside property situated between them (the common method of transport being by boat) for his home. In about 1520 he purchased a parcel of land comprising "undisturbed wood and pasture", stretching from the Thames in Chelsea to the present-day King's Road. There he caused to be built a dignified red-brick mansion (known simply as More's house or Chelsea House) in which he lived until his arrest in 1534. In the bawdy poem The Twelve Mery Jestes of Wyddow Edyth, written in 1525 by a member of More's household (or even by More himself) using the pseudonym of "Walter Smith", the widow arrives by boat at "Chelsay...where she had best cheare of all/in the house of Syr Thomas More."

Upon More's arrest the estate was confiscated, coming into the possession of the Comptroller of the Royal Household, William Paulet.

In 1682, the property was renamed Beaufort House after 1st Duke of Beaufort, a new owner.

=== Crosby Hall ===
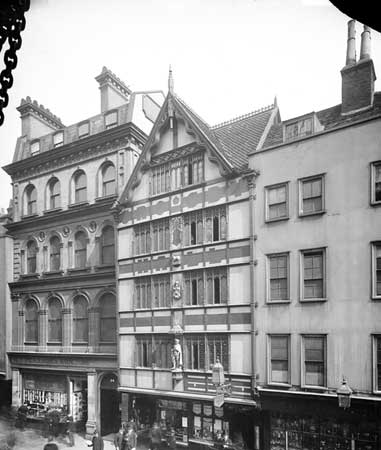
Crosby Hall on its Bishopsgate site, c. 1885

In June 1523 More bought the "very large and beautiful" Crosby Place (Crosby Hall) in Bishopsgate, London, but this was not a simple transaction: eight months later he sold the property (never having lived there) at a considerable profit to his friend and business partner Antonio Bonvisi who, in turn, leased it back to More's son-in-law William Roper and nephew William Rastell; possibly this was an agreed means of dealing with a debt between More and Bonvisi. Because of this the Crown did not confiscate the property after More's execution.

=== Chelsea Old Church ===
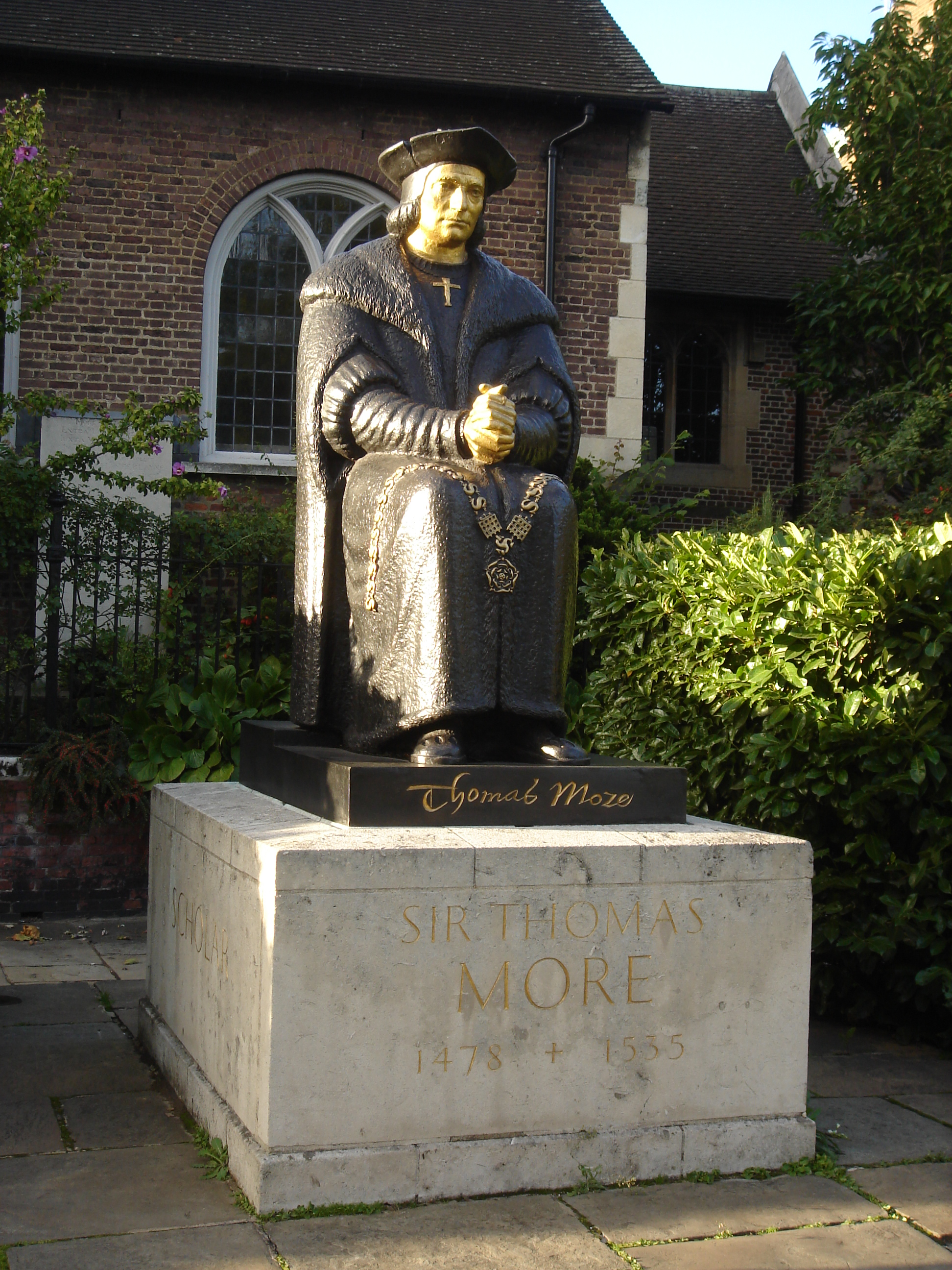
Statue of Thomas More outside Chelsea Old Church in west London

Across a small park and Old Church Street from Crosby Hall is Chelsea Old Church, an Anglican church whose southern chapel More commissioned and in which he sang with the parish choir. Except for his chapel, the church was largely destroyed in the Second World War and rebuilt in 1958. The capitals on the medieval arch connecting the chapel to the main sanctuary display symbols associated with More and his office. On the southern wall of the sanctuary is the tomb and epitaph he erected for himself and his wives, detailing his ancestry and accomplishments in Latin, including his role as peacemaker between the various Christian European states as well as a curiously altered portion about his curbing heresy. When More served Mass, he would leave by the door just to the left of it. He is not, however, buried here, nor is it entirely certain which of his family may be. It is open to the public at specific times. Outside the church, facing the River Thames, is a statue by British sculptor Leslie Cubitt Bevis, erected in 1969, commemorating More as "saint", "scholar", and "statesman"; the back displays his coat-of-arms. Nearby, on Upper Cheyne Row, the Roman Catholic Church of Our Most Holy Redeemer & St. Thomas More honours the martyr.

=== Tower Hill ===
A plaque and small garden commemorate the famed execution site on Tower Hill, London, just outside the Tower of London, as well as all those executed there, many as religious martyrs or as prisoners of conscience. More's corpse, minus his head, was unceremoniously buried in an unmarked mass grave beneath the Royal Chapel of St. Peter Ad Vincula, within the walls of the Tower of London, as was the custom for traitors executed at Tower Hill. The chapel is accessible to Tower visitors.

=== St Katharine Docks ===
Thomas More is commemorated by a stone plaque near St Katharine Docks, just east of the Tower where he was executed. The street in which it is situated was formerly called Nightingale Lane, a corruption of "Knighten Guild", derived from the original owners of the land. It is now renamed Thomas More Street in his honour.

=== St Dunstan's Church and Roper House, Canterbury ===
St Dunstan's Church, an Anglican parish church in Canterbury, possesses More's head, rescued by his daughter Margaret Roper, whose family lived in Canterbury down and across the street from their parish church. A stone immediately to the left of the altar marks the sealed Roper family vault beneath the Nicholas Chapel, itself to the right of the church's sanctuary or main altar. St Dunstan's Church has carefully investigated, preserved and sealed this burial vault. The last archaeological investigation, conducted in 1982, revealed that the suspected head of More rests in a niche separate from the other bodies, possibly from later interference. Displays in the chapel record the archaeological findings in pictures and narratives. Roman Catholics donated stained glass to commemorate the events in More's life. A small plaque marks the former home of William and Margaret Roper; another house nearby and entitled Roper House is now a home for deaf people. In 2025, St Dunstan's Church announced plans to exhume and preserve More's head.

== Works ==
Note: The reference "CW" is to the relevant volume of the Yale Edition of the Complete Works of St. Thomas More (New Haven and London 1963–1997)

=== Published during More's lifetime (with dates of publication) ===
- A Merry Jest (c. 1516) (CW 1)
- Utopia (1516) (CW 4)
- Epigrammata or Latin Poems (1518, 1520) (CW 3, Pt.2)
- Letter to Brixius (1520) (CW 3, Pt. 2, App C)
- Responsio ad Lutherum (The Answer to Luther, 1523) (CW 5)
- A Dialogue Concerning Heresies (1529, 1530) (CW 6)
- Supplication of Souls (1529) (CW 7)
- Letter Against Frith (1532) (CW 7) pdf
- The Confutation of Tyndale's Answer (1532, 1533) (CW 8) Books 1–4, Books 5–9
- Apology (1533) (CW 9)
- Debellation of Salem and Bizance (1533) (CW 10) pdf
- The Answer to a Poisoned Book (1533) (CW 11) pdf

=== Published posthumously (with likely dates of composition) ===
- The Historie of the Pitifull Life, and Unfortunate Death of Edward the Fifth, and the then Duke of Yorke His Brother (1513) and The Tragicall Historie of the Life and Reigne of Richard the Third (c. 1513–1518; published together in 1641) (CW 2 & 15)
- The Four Last Things (c. 1522) (CW 1)
- A Dialogue of Comfort Against Tribulation (1534) (CW 12)
- Treatise Upon the Passion (1534) (CW 13)
- Treatise on the Blessed Body (1535) (CW 13)
- Instructions and Prayers (1535) (CW 13)
- De Tristitia Christi (1535) (CW 14) (preserved in the Real Colegio Seminario del Corpus Christi, Valencia)

== Translations ==
- Translations of Lucian (many dates 1506–1534) (CW 3, Pt.1)
- The Life of Pico della Mirandola, by Gianfrancesco Pico della Mirandola (c. 1510) (CW 1)

== Media portrayals ==
- A Man for All Seasons, 1966 film: More was portrayed by Paul Scofield.
- Anne of the Thousand Days, 1969 film: More was portrayed by William Squire.
- Henry VIII and His Six Wives, 1972 film: More was portrayed by Michael Goodliffe.
- God's Outlaw: The Story of William Tyndale, 1986 film: More was portrayed by Bernard Archard.
- A Man for All Seasons, 1988 made-for-TV film: More was portrayed by Charlton Heston.
- The Tudors, 2007–2010 TV series: More was portrayed by Jeremy Northam.
- Wolf Hall, 2015 TV miniseries: More was portrayed by Anton Lesser.
- The Spanish Princess, 2019 TV miniseries: More was portrayed by Andrew Buchan.
- 3 Body Problem, 2024 TV miniseries: More was portrayed by Kevin Eldon.

== Coat of arms ==
Coat of arms of Thomas More
Crest Crest: A Moor's bust in profile proper from the ear two annulets conjoined or, a shirt also proper. Escutcheon Arms: Quarterly: 1st and 4th, Argent a chevron engrailed between three moorcocks sable, crested Gules; 2nd and 3rd, Argent on a chevron between three unicorns' heads erased sable as many bezants

== Sources ==
=== Biographies ===
- Ackroyd, Peter (1999). The Life of Thomas More. Chatto & Windus. ISBN 9780385477093.
- Basset, Bernard (1965). Born for Friendship: The Spirit of Sir Thomas More. London: Burns & Oates.
- Berglar, Peter (2009). Thomas More: A Lonely Voice against the Power of the State. New York: Scepter Publishers. ISBN 978-1-59417-073-7. (Note: this is a 2009 translation (from the original German, by Hector de Cavilla) of Berglar's 1978 work Die Stunde des Thomas Morus – Einer gegen die Macht. Freiburg 1978; Adamas-Verlag, Köln 1998, ISBN 3-925746-78-1)
- Brady, Charles A. (1953). Stage of Fools: A Novel of Sir Thomas More. Dutton.
- Brémond, Henri (1904) – Le Bienheureux Thomas More 1478–1535 (1904) as Sir Thomas More (1913) translated by Henry Child;
  (Note: Brémond is frequently cited in Berglar (2009))
  - 1920 edition published by R. & T. Washbourne Limited, OCLC 1224822, 749455885;
  - Paperback edition by Kessinger Publishing, LLC (2006), ISBN 978-1-4286-1904-3
  - published in French in Paris by Gabalda, 1920, OCLC 369064822
- Bridgett, Thomas Edward (1891). Life and Writings of Sir Thomas More, Lord Chancellor of England and Martyr under Henry VIII.
- Chambers, R. W. (1935). Thomas More. Harcourt, Brace.
- Guy, John (1980). The Public Career of Sir Thomas More. Yale University Press. ISBN 978-0-300-02546-0.
- ——— (2000). Thomas More. Arnold. ISBN 978-0-340-73138-3.
- ——— (2009). A Daughter's Love: Thomas More and His Daughter Meg.
- Hiscock, Andrew; Wilcox, Helen, eds. (2017). The Oxford Handbook of Early Modern English Literature and Religion. Oxford: University Press. ISBN 978-0-19-165342-1.
- House, Seymour B. (2008) [2004]. "More, Thomas". Oxford Dictionary of National Biography (online ed.). Oxford University Press. doi:10.1093/ref:odnb/19191. (Subscription, Wikipedia Library access or UK public library membership required.)
- Marius, Richard (1984). Thomas More: A Biography. Vintage Books. ISBN 9780394741468.
- ——— (1999). Thomas More: a biography. Harvard University Press. ISBN 978-0-674-88525-7.
- More, Cresacre (1828). The Life of Sir Thomas More by His Great-Grandson. W. Pickering. p. 344.
- Moynahan, Brian (2014). God's Bestseller: William Tyndale, Thomas More, and the Writing of the English Bible – A Story of Martyrdom and Betrayal. St. Martin's Publishing Group. ISBN 978-1-4668-6650-8.
- Mueller, Janel; Loewenstein, David, eds. (2002). The Cambridge History of Early Modern English Literature. Cambridge University Press. ISBN 978-0-521-63156-3.
- Phélippeau, Marie-Claire (2016). Thomas More. Gallimard.
- Reynolds, E. E. (1964). The Trials of St Thomas More. OCLC 1151429636.
- ——— (1965). Thomas More and Erasmus. New York: Fordham University Press.
- Ridley, Jasper (1983). Statesman and Saint: Cardinal Wolsey, Sir Thomas More, and the Politics of Henry VIII. Viking Press. ISBN 0-670-48905-0.
- Roper, William (2003), Wegemer, Gerard B.; Smith, Stephen W. (eds.), The Life of Sir Thomas More (1556) (PDF), Center for Thomas More Studies, archived from the original (PDF) on 8 June 2012
- Roper, William (2007). The Life of St. Thomas More. Benediction Classics. ISBN 978-1-4092-2795-3.
- Stapleton, Thomas, The Life and Illustrious Martyrdom of Sir Thomas More (1588) (PDF), archived from the original (PDF) on 29 December 2016.
- Wegemer, Gerard (1985). Thomas More: A Portrait of Courage. Scepter Publishers. ISBN 978-1-889334-12-7.
- ——— (1996). Thomas More on Statesmanship. Catholic University of America Press. ISBN 978-0-8132-0836-7.
- Wordsworth, Christopher (1810). Ecclesiastical Biography, Or, Lives of Eminent Men Connected with the History of Religion in England. Vol. 2. London: Rivingtons.

=== Historiography ===
- Gushurst-Moore, André (2004), "A Man for All Eras: Recent Books on Thomas More", Political Science Reviewer, 33: 90–143.
- Guy, John (2000), "The Search for the Historical Thomas More", History Review: 15+
- Miles, Leland. "Persecution and the Dialogue of Comfort: A Fresh Look at the Charges against Thomas More." Journal of British Studies, vol. 5, no. 1, 1965, pp. 19–30. online

=== Primary sources ===
- More, Thomas (1947), Rogers, Elizabeth (ed.), The Correspondence of Sir Thomas More, Princeton University Press.
- ——— (1963–1997), Yale Edition of the Complete Works of St. Thomas More, Yale University Press.
- ——— (2001), da Silva, Álvaro (ed.), The Last Letters of Thomas More.
- ——— (2003), Thornton, John F (ed.), Saint Thomas More: Selected Writings.
- ——— (2004), Wegemer, Gerald B; Smith, Stephen W (eds.), A Thomas More Source Book, Catholic University of America Press.
- ——— (2010), Logan, George M; Adams, Robert M (eds.), Utopia, Critical Editions (3rd ed.), Norton.

Political offices
Preceded by Sir Richard Wingfield	Chancellor of the Duchy of Lancaster; 1525–1529	Succeeded by Sir William Fitzwilliam
Preceded by Sir Thomas Neville	Speaker of the House of Commons; 1523	Succeeded by Sir Thomas Audley
Preceded by Thomas Wolsey	Lord Chancellor; 1529–1532	Succeeded by Sir Thomas Audley
