= Gerard Wegemer =

English professor and center director

Gerard B. Wegemer is a professor at the University of Dallas and the founding Director for The Center for Thomas More Studies. He has published many articles and books on Thomas More and is a member of the Board of Editors for Moreana, the international journal on Thomas More and Renaissance studies. He has graduate degrees in political philosophy and literature from the University of Notre Dame, Georgetown University, and Boston College. He is co-editor of The Essential Works of Thomas More, which assembles all of More's major English and Latin works for the first time in a single volume. He is also co-editor of essentialmore.org and thomasmorestudies.org. His other notable publications include Young Thomas More and the Arts of Liberty (2011), Thomas More's Trial by Jury: A Procedural and Legal Review with a Collection of Documents (2011), A Thomas More Source Book (2004), Thomas More on Statesmanship (1996), and Thomas More: A Portrait of Courage (1995). He is deemed "one of the pre-eminent scholars on St. Thomas More."

Through years of developing the website of the Center for Thomas More Studies, Wegemer has greatly advanced the field of More scholarship by making available hundreds of primary source documents by More and his associates, in addition to indexed concordances of his works, analyses of the Latin writings, curriculum units for teaching More, annotated editions for the classroom, and a compendious collection of More criticism. The site also houses concordances to each of More's works as well as comprehensive concordances for More's corpus as a whole, and over fifteen volumes of the online journal Thomas More Studies.

In 2005, Wegemer was honored with the "Dignitatis Humanae Award," presented annually by the University of St. Thomas School of Law "to an individual whose professional career is a model of the integration of faith and ethics into professional identity."

== Select bibliography ==
- Wegemer, Gerard B; Stephen W. Smith (2020). The Essential Works of Thomas More. New Haven: Yale University Press. ISBN 978-0-300-22337-8.
- Wegemer, Gerard B. (2011). Young Thomas More and the Arts of Liberty. Cambridge, UK: Cambridge University Press. ISBN 978-0-521-19653-6.
- Wegemer, Gerard B.; Henry Ansgar Kelley; Louis W. Karlin (2011). Thomas More's Trial by Jury: A Procedural and Legal Review with a Collection of Documents. Woodbridge, Suffolk, UK: Boydell Press. ISBN 978-1-84383-629-2.
- Wegemer, Gerard B.; Stephen W. Smith (2004). A Thomas More Sourcebook. Washington, D.C.: Catholic University of America Press. ISBN 0-8132-1376-2.
- Wegemer, Gerard B. (1996). Thomas More on Statesmanship. Washington, D.C.: Catholic University of America Press. ISBN 0-8132-0836-X.
- Wegemer, Gerard B. (1995). Thomas More: A Portrait of Courage. Princeton: Scepter. ISBN 0-933932-84-7.
- Wegemer, Gerard; Clarence Miller (1993). The Sadness of Christ: And Final Prayers and Instructions, by Saint Thomas More. Princeton: Scepter. ISBN 0-933932-66-9.
