= Responsio ad Lutherum =

1523 book by Thomas More

Responsio ad Lutherum is a book written in Latin in 1523 by Thomas More, asked for by Henry VIII of England, against the teachings of Martin Luther. It was a response to Luther's 1522 tract Against Henry, King of the English which was itself a reaction to Henry's 1521 treatise Defence of the Seven Sacraments.

It was More's first major theological work.
