= James Bainham =

English lawyer and Protestant martyr

James Bainham (died 30 April 1532) was an English lawyer and Protestant reformer who was burned as a heretic in 1532.

== Life ==
According to John Foxe he was a son of Sir Alexander Bainham, who was sheriff of Gloucestershire in 1497, 1501, and 1516; and a nephew of William Tracy. He was a member of the Middle Temple, and practised as a lawyer. He married the widow of Simon Fish, author of the Supplication of Beggars. In 1531 he was allegedly accused of heresy to Sir Thomas More, then Lord Chancellor of England. John Foxe alleges that More imprisoned and flogged Bainham in his house at Chelsea, and then sent him to the Tower of London to be racked, in the hope of making him name names. This, however, is doubted by later historians.

On 15 December he was examined before John Stokesley, Bishop of London, concerning his belief in purgatory, confession, extreme unction, and other points. His answers were couched in words of Scripture, but were not satisfactory to the court, who believed that his approval of the works of William Tyndale and John Frith (whose books he possessed) was evident. The following day, being threatened with sentence, he partially submitted, pleading ignorance, and was again committed to prison. In the following February he was brought before the bishop's chancellor to be examined as to his fitness for readmission to the church, and after considerable hesitation abjured all his errors, and, having paid a fine and performed penance by standing with a faggot on his shoulder during the sermon at Paul's Cross, was released.

Within a month, however, he openly withdrew his recantation during Mass at St. Austin's Church. He was apprehended and brought before the bishop's vicar-general on 19 and 20 April. One of the articles alleged against him was that he asserted Thomas Becket to be a thief and murderer. He was sentenced as a relapsed heretic and burned at Smithfield on 30 April 1532. In the Calendar of State Papers of Henry VIII there is a contemporary account of an interview between him and Hugh Latimer, the day before his death. Robert Demaus records that conversation. He writes that Bainham informed Latimer of the articles for which he was dying.

"Bainham recapitulated the articles. He had spoken of Thomas-à-Becket, the great patron saint of the South East of England, as a traitor. 'That,' said Latimer emphatically, 'is no cause at all worthy for a man to take his death upon.' 'I spoke also against purgatory,' Bainham proceeded, 'that there was no such thing; but that it picked men's purses; and against satisfactory masses' (i.e., against the doctrine that the mass was an atonement or sacrifice for sins). 'Marry,' said Latimer, ' in these articles your conscience may be so stayed, that you may seem rather to die' [i.e., it may seem your duty rather to die] 'in the defence thereof, than to recant both against your conscience, and the Scriptures also. But yet beware of vain-glory; for the devil will be ready now to infect you therewith, when you shall come into the multitude of the people.' After thus cautioning him against the imaginary danger of sacrificing his life simply out of pure vanity, Latimer encouraged him to take his death quietly and patiently. Bainham thanked him heartily, and having doubtless perceived Latimer's own weak point, he added, 'I likewise do exhort you to stand for the defence of the truth; for you that shall be left behind had need of comfort' [strength] 'also, the world being so dangerous as it is'; and so spake many comfortable works to Latimer. After some further converse they departed; and the next day (April 30) Bainham was burned, constant and undaunted to the end."

== In modern fiction ==
Bainham was a character in the "Anna Regina" episode of the Wolf Hall miniseries made in 2014, and was played by Jonathan Aris.
