= Brian Moynahan =

English journalist, historian and biographer (1941–2018)

Brian Moynahan (30 March 1941 – 1 April 2018) was an English journalist, historian and biographer. He was born in 1941, the son of the dermatologist Edmund Moynahan of Guy's Hospital and Great Ormond Street Hospital. He was educated at Sherborne School and Corpus Christi College, Cambridge, where he was a Foundation Scholar and editor of the student magazines Cambridge Opinion and Broadsheet. He graduated in 1962 with a double First in history.

He was a leader writer with The Yorkshire Post before covering wars in Vietnam, Laos and Borneo, the violencia in Colombia and the American intervention in the Dominican Republic, for Town Magazine, and The Times. He also wrote on industry and business in the Far East. He was editor of Town before joining the staff of The Sunday Times in 1968.

As a foreign correspondent, Moynahan covered the Arab-Israeli, Ethiopian and Lebanese conflicts, as well as events in Europe and Russia. He was latterly The Sunday Times Europe editor, based in Paris, before concentrating on writing books.

These include the award-winning history, The Russian Century, The Faith, a history of Christianity, If God Spare My Life, a biography of William Tyndale, described as "a triumph, authoritative, vital, passionate, closely attentive to the sources" and the best-selling Airport International and Jungle Soldier. His last book, Leningrad Siege and Symphony, an account of Shostakovich's Seventh Symphony, was a Spectator Book of The Year.

== Death ==
Moynahan died on 1 April 2018 at the age of 77.

== Works ==
- Airport International, 1978
- Fool's Paradise, 1983
- Claws of the Bear, a history of the Soviet Armed Forces, 1989
- Comrades 1917, Russia in Revolution, 1992
- The Russian Century, 1994
- The British Century, 1997
- Rasputin, the Saint who Sinned, 1998
- The Faith, a history of Christianity, 2003
- If God Spare My Life, 2003
- The French Century, 2007
- Forgotten Soldiers, 2008
- Jungle Soldier, 2010
- Leningrad Siege and Symphony, Shostakovich's Seventh Symphony, 2014

== Reception ==
Harold Evans, author of The American Century, and publisher of The Russian Century said that Moynahan's book Leningrad: Siege and Symphony was "a stupendous story, driven by a furious narrative yet biblical in its thematic confrontations of beauty and evil," calling it "history to cherish.”
