= Richard Rex =

British historian (born 1961)

- Born: 27 January 1961 (age 65); Ipswich, Suffolk, England

Academic background
- Education: Warwick School
- Alma mater: Trinity College, Cambridge
- Doctoral advisor: Brendan Bradshaw

Academic work
- Discipline: History; Theology
- Sub-discipline: English Reformation; Tudor period; History of Protestantism
- Institutions: St John's College, Cambridge; Queens' College, Cambridge

Richard Rex (born 27 January 1961) is a British historian.

Rex was born in Ipswich. He was educated at Warwick School and Trinity College, Cambridge, where he read history and graduated with MA and PhD degrees. Following his doctorate he was a research fellow at St John's College, Cambridge, and a lecturer and reader at the Faculty of Divinity of the University of Cambridge. He is currently the Professor of Reformation History at the Faculty of Divinity, and is also the Polkinghorne Fellow in Theology and Religious Studies at Queens' College, Cambridge, where he is Director of Studies in Theological and Religious Studies, Tutor for graduate students, and Deputy Senior Tutor.

He edited the editio princeps of Thomas Swinnerton's Tropes and Figures from a manuscript.

== Books and publications ==
- The Theology of John Fisher – 1991
- Henry VIII and the English Reformation – 1993
- The Lollards – 2002
- Lady Margaret Beaufort and her Professors of Divinity at Cambridge 1502 - 1649 – 2003
- A Reformation rhetoric Thomas Swynnerton's The tropes and figures of scripture – 2004
- The Tudors – 2006
- The Making of Martin Luther – 2017
