= Richard Bayfield =

English Protestant martyr (died 1531)

Richard Bayfield (died 27 November 1531) was an English Protestant martyr.

A graduate of the University of Cambridge, he became a Benedictine monk and Chamberlain of the Abbey of Bury St Edmunds. At some time in 1522, an Augustinian rector at Cambridge, Robert Barnes visited Edmund Rougham, an acquaintance from their days at Leuven. Barnes gave Bayfield a copy of a Latin translation of the New Testament. After two years of study, Bayfield's interpretations brought him into trouble with his superiors and he was imprisoned in the house. Barnes eventually secured his release and brought him back to Cambridge.

Bayfield was later imprisoned and interrogated by Bishop Tunstall. He recanted, but escaped to the Low Countries where he joined the English exiles and proved to be of great help to William Tyndale. He then returned to England and was active in circulating the New Testament and other prohibited books, including the works of Luther, Zwingli and Melancthon. He was discovered, imprisoned and tortured, before being burned at the stake at Smithfield on 27 November 1531, by Thomas More.

== See also ==
- English Reformation
- List of Protestant martyrs of the English Reformation
- William Tyndale
