= List of portrait drawings by Hans Holbein the Younger =

The following is a list of portrait drawings by Hans Holbein the Younger that are generally accepted as by his own hand.

== Royal Collection ==
Work.	Title.	Date.	Medium	Size	Notes	Related works
	Simon George	c. 1535	Black and coloured chalks, pen and ink, brush and ink, also metalpoint on pale pink prepared paper.	27.9 × 19.1 cm	Simon George of Cornwall was an English nobleman. The drawing is related to a circular painting by Holbein in the Städel Museum, Frankfurt. As was revealed by X-ray radiograms, the sitter's beard in the painting was initially much shorter, making it more similar to the drawing.	
	William Reskimer	c. 1532 – c. 1534	Black and coloured chalks, pen and ink, and metalpoint on pale pink prepared paper.	29.0 × 21.0 cm	William Reskimer held a number of minor positions at Henry VIII's court. The drawing is a study for a painted portrait by Holbein, also in the Royal Collection.	
	An unidentified woman	c. 1532 – c. 1543	Black and coloured chalks, white bodycolour, and pen with black and brown ink on pale pink prepared paper which has been trimmed to outlines and pasted onto another sheet.	27.1 × 16.9 cm	Formerly identified as Amalia of Cleves, sister of Anne of Cleves, the fourth wife of Henry VIII.	
	Elizabeth Audley	c. 1538	Black and coloured chalks, pen and ink, and metalpoint on pale pink prepared paper.	29.3 × 20.8 cm	Elizabeth, Lady Audley was the second wife of Thomas Audley, 1st Baron Audley of Walden and daughter of Thomas Grey, 2nd Marquess of Dorset. The drawing relates to a circular miniature by Holbein, also in the Royal Collection. A drawing of her mother Margaret Wotton, Marchioness of Dorset, by Holbein, is also in the Royal Collection; a related 1560s painted portrait, by a follower of Holbein, is in the Weiss Gallery in London; while a late-16th-century one is at Anglesey Abbey, Lode, Cambridgeshire.	
	Anne Boleyn	c. 1533 – c. 1536	Black and coloured chalks on pale pink prepared paper.	28.2 × 19.3 cm	Traditionally believed to be Anne Boleyn, the second wife of Henry VIII and mother of Elizabeth I. The drawing is consistent with both the only undisputed contemporary depiction of Anne — the badly worn 1534 coronation medal in the British Museum — and an anonymous French description of her being "scrofulous and therefore fastening her dress very high on the throat, in the fashion employed by the goitrous people". Another drawing by Holbein, formerly identified as that of Anne Boleyn, is in the British Museum, London.	
	James Butler	c. 1537	Black and coloured chalks, white bodycolour, red, blue-grey, and brown wash, pen and ink, and brush and ink on pale pink prepared paper.	40.1 × 29.2 cm	The sitter is James Butler, 9th Earl of Ormond and 2nd Earl of Ossory. Formerly identified as his cousin Thomas Boleyn, 1st Earl of Wiltshire (father of Anne Boleyn, the second wife of Henry VIII). The costume resembles the one worn by Henry VIII in the cartoon for the lost Whitehall Mural (and the many portraits derived from it). The mural was dated 1537, which gives the approximate date for the drawing; David Starkey dates it specifically to the autumn of 1537 on biographical grounds.	
	Alice London, Lady Borough	c. 1541	Black and coloured chalks on pale pink prepared paper.	27.2 × 19.6 cm	Recently thought by some to be Catherine Parr. Catherine's first father-in-law, Lord Thomas Burgh, had to pull his connections just to get his wife, Lady Borough, painted by Holbein. Burgh married twice; first in 1496 to Agnes (died 1522), daughter of Sir William Trywhitt of Kettleby. Sometime after 15 March 1538, Burgh married secondly to the widowed Lady Alice Bedingfield of Oxburgh, daughter of William London. By 1541, Lord Burgh was part of the household of Prince Edward. The portrait was done some time during the couples stay at court; 1540–42.	
	Nicholas Bourbon	1535	Black and coloured chalks, and pen and ink on pale pink prepared paper.	30.8 × 25.9 cm	Nicholas Bourbon was a French poet at the court of Henry VIII. He was a friend of Holbein and described him in a letter as "the royal painter, the Apelles of our time". He also wrote verses for an edition of Holbein's Historiarum veteris instrumenti icones ad vivum expressae. The drawing is a study for a painted portrait by Holbein, now lost, but possibly recorded in a 1535 woodcut.	
	George Brooke	c. 1532 – c. 1543	Black and coloured chalks, pen and ink and metalpoint, on pale pink prepared paper.	28.9 × 20.3 cm	The sitter is George Brooke, 9th Baron Cobham. A painting by a follower of Holbein, tentatively dated to the 1540s, closely following the drawing, formerly in a German private collection, was sold at auction in 2011.	
	Margaret Butts	c. 1541 – c. 1543	Black and coloured chalks, pen and ink, brush and ink, and metalpoint on pale pink prepared paper.	37.7 × 27.2 cm	Margaret, Lady Butts was a lady-in-waiting to Princess Mary and belonged to the circle of Catherine Parr, the sixth wife of Henry VIII. The drawing is a study for a portrait by Holbein in the Isabella Stewart Gardner Museum, Boston. A painted portrait of her husband, Henry VIII's physician Sir William Butts, by Holbein, is also in the Isabella Stewart Gardner Museum. He also appears in the group painting King Henry VIII and the Barber Surgeons, by Holbein, preserved by the Worshipful Company of Barbers, London.	
	Gavin Carew	c. 1532 – c. 1543	Black and coloured chalks, pen and ink, and metalpoint on pale pink prepared paper.	27.2 × 21.3 cm	The sitter is Sir Gavin Carew. A drawing of his nephew Admiral Sir George Carew, by Holbein, is also in the Royal Collection; a related circular painting by Holbein (circle of) is in Weston Park, owned by the Earls of Bradford. A drawing of his kinsman Nicholas Carew, by Holbein, is in the Kunstmuseum Basel in Basel, Switzerland; a related painting by Holbein is in the Drumlanrig Castle, part of the Buccleuch collection. A drawing of his wife Lady Mary Guildford, by Holbein, is in the Kunstmuseum Basel; a related painting by Holbein is in the Saint Louis Art Museum, while a 16th-century copy is in the Metropolitan Museum of Art, New York.	
	George Carew	c. 1532 – c. 1543	Black and coloured chalks, and metalpoint on pale pink prepared paper.	31.6 × 23.3 cm	Admiral Sir George Carew was the commander of the Royal Navy flagship Mary Rose when it sank in 1545. The drawing is related to a circular painting by Holbein (circle of) in Weston Park, owned by the Earls of Bradford. A drawing of his uncle Sir Gavin Carew, by Holbein, is also in the Royal Collection. A drawing of his kinsman Nicholas Carew, by Holbein, is in the Kunstmuseum Basel in Basel, Switzerland; a related painting by Holbein is in the Drumlanrig Castle, part of the Buccleuch collection.	
	Edward Fiennes de Clinton	c. 1532 – c. 1543	Black and coloured chalks on pale pink prepared paper.	22.0 × 14.5 cm	The sitter is Edward Clinton, 1st Earl of Lincoln.	
	John Colet	c. 1535	Black and coloured chalks, pen and ink, brush and ink, and metalpoint on pale pink prepared paper.	26.8 × 20.5 cm	John Colet was the Dean of St Paul's Cathedral and the founder of St Paul's School, London. He died in 1519, years before Holbein's first visit to England. The drawing is a study of a lost bust of circa 1520 attributed to Pietro Torrigiano and probably based on a death mask. A 16th-century cast, preserved in St Paul's School since at least 1552, is now at the Mercers' Hall, London (a copy of the cast is in the National Portrait Gallery). The cast is actually a composite, only the head being original and the rest probably dating to the late 18th century and based on Holbein's drawing. The head was found among the ruins of the school after the 1666 Great Fire of London by antiquarian John Bagford. The very same fire also destroyed the original bust, which formed a part of Colet's tomb in the Old St Paul's Cathedral. The tomb's appearance is recorded in an engraving of 1656, possibly by Wenceslaus Hollar, and a watercolour miniature of circa 1585, probably by William Segar, on the cover of the manuscript Statu[t]es of Saint Paul's School, preserved at the Mercers' Hall; the badly damaged remains of the bust, comprising only torso and hands, were reproduced in an 1809 engraving, but have since disappeared.	
	Anne Cresacre	c. 1527	Black and coloured chalks.	37.2 × 26.6 cm	Anne Cresacre, aged 15, was the ward of Thomas More, later the wife of his son John More the Younger. The drawing is one of the eight individual portrait studies for a group portrait of Thomas More's family preserved in the Royal Collection. Destroyed by fire at the Kremsier Castle (Czech Republic) in 1752, its appearance is preserved in an annotated drawing by Holbein, now in Kunstmuseum Basel. There are also several later copies, including three 1592–1594 versions by Rowland Lockey: a watercolor miniature in the Victoria and Albert Museum and two oils on canvas, one in the National Portrait Gallery, and one at the Nostell Priory, West Yorkshire. A drawing of her husband, by Holbein, from the same series, is also in the Royal Collection.	
	Elizabeth Dauncey	c. 1526 – c. 1527	Black and coloured chalks.	36.7 × 26.0 cm	Elizabeth Dauncey, aged 21, was the daughter of Thomas More. In 1525, she married William Dauncey, son of Sir John Dauncey, Privy Councillor and Knight of the Body to Henry VIII. The drawing is one of the eight individual portrait studies for a group portrait of Thomas More's family preserved in the Royal Collection. Destroyed by fire at the Kremsier Castle (Czech Republic) in 1752, its appearance is preserved in an annotated drawing by Holbein, now in Kunstmuseum Basel. There are also several later copies, including three 1592–1594 versions by Rowland Lockey: a watercolor miniature in the Victoria and Albert Museum and two oils on canvas, one in the National Portrait Gallery, and one at the Nostell Priory, West Yorkshire. The series also includes two drawings of her siblings, one of John More, and one of Cicely Heron; a further one depicts her grandfather John More the Elder. Another drawing, and one similar to it, also from the series, depict her father; a related painted portrait is in the Frick Collection, New York. The compositional sketch in Basel also records the likenesses of her sister Margaret Roper (a portrait miniature of her, by Holbein, is in the Metropolitan Museum of Art, New York).	
	Margaret, Marchioness of Dorset	c. 1532 – c. 1535	Black and coloured chalks, pen and ink, and metalpoint on pale pink prepared paper.	33.2 × 23.6 cm	The sitter is Margaret Wotton, Marchioness of Dorset. In 1533, she was one of the two godmothers to the future Queen Elizabeth I. Her husband was Thomas Grey, 2nd Marquess of Dorset, a prominent courtier at the court of Henry VIII, key witness in favour of the King's divorce of Catherine of Aragon. One of their many grandchildren was Lady Jane Grey, the Nine Day Queen. The drawing is a study for a painted portrait, now lost; a 1560s copy is in the Weiss Gallery in London; a late-16th-century one is at Anglesey Abbey, Lode, Cambridgeshire. A drawing and a related circular miniature of her daughter Elizabeth, Lady Audley, both by Holbein, are also in the Royal Collection.	
	Edward, Prince of Wales	1538	Black and coloured chalks, and pen and ink on pale pink prepared paper.	26.4 × 22.4 cm	The sitter is the future King Edward VI, son of Henry VIII and Jane Seymour, aged 1. The drawing is a study for a painting by Holbein in the National Gallery of Art, Washington. Holbein gave the painting to the King as the 1539 New Year's gift. Another drawing of Edward by Holbein, produced only a few years later, is also in the Royal Collection.	
	Edward, Prince of Wales	c. 1540 – c. 1543	Black and coloured chalks, and pen and ink on pale pink prepared paper.	27.3 × 22.7 cm	The sitter is the future King Edward VI, son of Henry VIII and Jane Seymour, aged 3–5. Another drawing of Edward, aged 1, by Holbein, is also in the Royal Collection; a related painting by Holbein is in the National Gallery of Art, Washington.	
	Margaret Elyot	c. 1532 – c. 1534	Black and coloured chalks, white bodycolour, and pen and ink on pale pink prepared paper.	27.8 × 20.8 cm	Margaret à Barrow, Lady Elyot was the wife of the English diplomat and scholar Sir Thomas Elyot. A drawing of her husband, by Holbein, is also in the Royal Collection.	
	Thomas Elyot	c. 1532 – c. 1534	Black and coloured chalks, white bodycolour, and brush and ink on pale pink prepared paper.	27.8 × 20.8 cm	Sir Thomas Elyot was an English diplomat and scholar. His best-known work is The Boke Named the Governour, a humanist book of political instruction dedicated to Henry VIII. He served as an ambassador to Charles V, Holy Roman Emperor. A drawing of his wife Margaret à Barrow, Lady Elyot, by Holbein, is also in the Royal Collection.	
	John Fisher	c. 1532 – c. 1534	Black and coloured chalks, brown wash, pen and ink, brush and ink on pale pink prepared paper.	38.2 × 23.2 cm	John Fisher, the Bishop of Rochester and Chancellor of the University of Cambridge, was beheaded on the order of Henry VIII for refusing to accept the King as Supreme Head of the Church of England; he is now recognized as Saint by both the Catholic Church and the Church of England. An early copy, oil-on-paper face pattern of circa 1527, is preserved in the National Portrait Gallery, London. A 17th-century copy, drawing sometimes attributed to Peter Paul Rubens, is in the British Museum.	
	William Fitzwilliam	c. 1536 – c. 1540	Black and coloured chalks, and metalpoint on pale pink prepared paper.	38.3 x 27.0 cm	William FitzWilliam, 1st Earl of Southampton was a part of Henry VIII's inner circle since before accession. He went on to serve as the Ambassador to France, Treasurer of the Household, Lord High Admiral, and Lord Privy Seal. The drawing is a study for a painting by Holbein, now lost (either the original or a copy perished in the fire that destroyed Cowdray House, Sussex, in 1793); one copy survives in the Fitzwilliam Museum, Cambridge.	
	John Gage	c. 1532 – c. 1543	Black and coloured chalks, pen and ink, and metalpoint on pale pink prepared paper.	39.4 × 29.0 cm	John Gage was an English courtier at the courts of Henry VIII, Edward VI, and Mary I.	
	Margaret Giggs	c. 1526 – c. 1527	Black and coloured chalks.	38.5 × 27.3 cm	Margaret Clement (née Giggs), aged 19, was the foster daughter of Thomas More. In 1526, she married John Clement, tutor to the More children and future President of the Royal College of Physicians. The drawing is one of the eight individual portrait studies for a group portrait of Thomas More's family preserved in the Royal Collection. Destroyed by fire at the Kremsier Castle (Czech Republic) in 1752, its appearance is preserved in an annotated drawing by Holbein, now in Kunstmuseum Basel. There are also several later copies, including three 1592–1594 versions by Rowland Lockey: a watercolor miniature in the Victoria and Albert Museum and two oils on canvas, one in the National Portrait Gallery, and one at the Nostell Priory, West Yorkshire.	
	John Godsalve	c. 1532 – c. 1534	Black and red chalks, pen and ink, brush and ink, bodycolour, white heightening, on pale pink prepared paper.	36.2 × 29.2 cm	Sir John Godsalve was an English politician. A 16th-century painting by an imitator of Holbein, sometimes thought to be based on this drawing, is in the Philadelphia Museum of Art. An earlier 1528 double portrait of John Godsalve and his father Sir Thomas Godsalve by Holbein is in the Gemäldegalerie Alte Meister, Dresden. A painting by Holbein, formerly identified as Godsalve's wife Agnes Widmerpole, is at the Oskar Reinhart Collection, Winterthur.	
	Henry Guildford	1527	Black and coloured chalks, and pen and ink.	38.3 × 29.4 cm	Sir Henry Guildford was one of Henry VIII's closest friends. At different times, he held the positions of an Esquire of the Body, Master of the Revels, Master of the Horse and Comptroller of the Royal Household. The drawing is a study for a painted portrait by Holbein, also in the Royal Collection. A drawing of his wife Lady Mary Guildford, by Holbein, is in the Kunstmuseum Basel in Basel, Switzerland; a related painting by Holbein is in the Saint Louis Art Museum, while a 16th-century copy is in the Metropolitan Museum of Art, New York.	
	Cicely Heron	c. 1526 – c. 1527	Black and coloured chalks.	37.8 × 28.1 cm	Cicely Heron, aged 20, was the daughter of Thomas More. In 1525, she married Giles Heron, a ward of More. The drawing is one of the eight individual portrait studies for a group portrait of Thomas More's family preserved in the Royal Collection. Destroyed by fire at the Kremsier Castle (Czech Republic) in 1752, its appearance is preserved in an annotated drawing by Holbein, now in Kunstmuseum Basel. There are also several later copies, including three 1592–1594 versions by Rowland Lockey: a watercolor miniature in the Victoria and Albert Museum and two oils on canvas, one in the National Portrait Gallery, and one at the Nostell Priory, West Yorkshire. It has long been noted that the pose of Cicely Heron, both in this drawing and especially in the annotated compositional sketch, is notably similar to that of Cecilia Gallerani in Leonardo da Vinci's Lady with an Ermine, although if this is a conscious reference or a mere coincidence remains uncertain. The series also includes two drawings of her siblings, one of John More, and one of Elizabeth Dauncey; a further one depicts her grandfather John More the Elder. Another drawing, and one similar to it, also from the series, depict her father; a related painted portrait is in the Frick Collection, New York. The compositional sketch in Basel also records the likenesses of her sister Margaret Roper (a portrait miniature of her, by Holbein, is in the Metropolitan Museum of Art, New York).	
	Mary Heveningham	c. 1532 – c. 1543	Black and coloured chalks, white bodycolour, pen and ink, and brush and ink on pale pink prepared paper.	30.3 × 21.1 cm	Mary, Lady Heveningham was the first cousin of Anne Boleyn, the second wife of Henry VIII. The main editor of and a major contributor to the famous compilation of poetry known as Devonshire Manuscript, she was romantically linked with poets Thomas Clere, Thomas Wyatt, and Henry Howard, Earl of Surrey; she may also have been a mistress of Henry VIII. A painting by Holbein, formerly thought to be of Mary, is at the Oskar Reinhart Collection, Winterthur.	
	Elizabeth Hoby	c. 1532 – c. 1543	Black and coloured chalks, pen and ink, and brush and ink on pale pink prepared paper.	27.5 × 20.1 cm	Elizabeth, Lady Hoby was a member of Queen Catherine Parr's circle. She was the daughter of Sir Walter Stonor, the Lieutenant of the Tower of London, and the wife of Sir Philip Hoby, the ambassador to the Holy Roman Empire and Flanders. A drawing of her husband, by Holbein, is also in the Royal Collection.	
	Philip Hoby	c. 1532 – c. 1543	Black and coloured chalks, and grey bodycolour on pale pink prepared paper.	30.1 × 22.3 cm	Sir Philip Hoby was the ambassador to the Holy Roman Empire and Flanders; he and Holbein travelled together on missions to find Henry VIII a fourth wife. A drawing of his wife Elizabeth, Lady Hoby, by Holbein, is also in the Royal Collection.	
	An unidentified woman	c. 1532 – c. 1543	Black and coloured chalks, and metalpoint on pale pink prepared paper.	27.7 × 19.7 cm	Formerly identified as Catherine Howard, the fifth wife of Henry VIII. As such, it was associated with two circular miniatures by Holbein, also formerly thought to be of Howard, one in the Royal collection and one in the Strawberry Hill House, part of the Buccleuch collection; an additional painting by Holbein, also formerly thought to be of Howard, is at the Toledo Museum of Art in Toledo, Ohio.	
	Henry Howard, Earl of Surrey	c. 1533 – c. 1536	Black and coloured chalks, and pen and ink on pale pink prepared paper.	29.0 × 21.0 cm	Henry Howard, Earl of Surrey was an English aristocrat, and one of the founders of English Renaissance poetry, introducing blank verse into the English language in his translation of Virgil's Aeneid. He was also a childhood friend of Henry VIII's illegitimate son Henry Fitzroy. The Royal Collection has two more drawings of Henry Howard, one by Holbein and one by a follower. A painted portrait of Henry Howard, by Holbein, is in the São Paulo Museum of Art, Brazil. A portrait painting of his father Thomas Howard, 3rd Duke of Norfolk, by Holbein, is also in the Royal Collection. A drawing of his wife Frances Howard, Countess of Surrey, by Holbein, is in the Royal Collection as well.	
	Henry Howard, Earl of Surrey	c. 1532 – c. 1533	Black and coloured chalks, and pen and ink on pale pink prepared paper.	25.1 × 20.5 cm	Henry Howard, Earl of Surrey was an English aristocrat, and one of the founders of English Renaissance poetry, introducing blank verse into the English language in his translation of Virgil's Aeneid. He was also a childhood friend of Henry VIII's illegitimate son Henry Fitzroy. The Royal Collection has two more drawings of Henry Howard, one by Holbein and one by a follower. A painted portrait of Henry Howard, by Holbein, is in the São Paulo Museum of Art, Brazil. A portrait painting of his father Thomas Howard, 3rd Duke of Norfolk, by Holbein, is also in the Royal Collection. A drawing of his sister Mary FitzRoy, Duchess of Richmond and Somerset, wife of Henry FitzRoy, is in the Royal Collection, too. A drawing of his wife Frances Howard, Countess of Surrey, by Holbein, is in the Royal Collection as well.	
	Frances, Countess of Surrey	c. 1532 – c. 1533	Black, white and coloured chalks, white bodycolour, and pen and ink, on pale pink prepared paper.	31.0 × 21.0 cm	Frances Howard, Countess of Surrey was the daughter of John de Vere, 15th Earl of Oxford and the wife of Henry Howard, Earl of Surrey. The Royal Collection has three drawings of her husband, two by Holbein, one in three-quarters and one frontal, and another one by a follower; an additional painting, by Holbein, is in the São Paulo Museum of Art, Brazil.	
	Mary, Duchess of Richmond and Somerset	c. 1532 – c. 1533	Black and coloured chalks, and brush and ink on pale pink prepared paper.	26.6 × 19.9 cm	Mary FitzRoy, Duchess of Richmond and Somerset was the wife of Henry VIII's only acknowledged illegitimate son Henry FitzRoy, 1st Duke of Richmond and Somerset. A portrait painting of her father Thomas Howard, 3rd Duke of Norfolk, by Holbein, is also in the Royal Collection. The Royal Collection also has three drawings of her brother Henry Howard, Earl of Surrey, two by Holbein, one in three-quarters and one frontal, and another one by a follower; an additional painting, by Holbein, is in the São Paulo Museum of Art, Brazil.	
	Lady Lister	c. 1532 – c. 1543	Black and coloured chalks, pen and ink and brush and ink on pale pink prepared paper.	29.0 × 21.0 cm	The precise identity of the sitter is unknown. One suggestion is Lady Jane Lister, the wife of Sir Richard Lyster, Lord Chief Justice.	
	Princess Mary	c. 1536	Black and coloured chalks, and pen and ink on pale pink prepared paper.	38.6 × 29.1 cm	The sitter is traditionally identified as the future Queen Mary I.	
	An unidentified man	c. 1532 – c. 1543	Black and coloured chalks, and pen and ink on pale pink prepared paper.	28.5 × 23.3 cm	Formerly identified as the theologian Philipp Melanchthon, one of the founders of Lutheranism. A portrait miniature of Melanchton, by Holbein, is in the Lower Saxony State Museum in Hanover, Germany; it is unlikely Holbein ever met him, so the miniature is probably based on pictures by other artists, like those by Lucas Cranach the Elder or Albrecht Dürer.	
	Joan Meutas	c. 1536 – c. 1543	Black and coloured chalks on pale pink prepared paper.	28.1 × 21.0 cm	The sitter is Lady Joan Meutas She was a lady of the privy chamber of Queen Jane Seymour, Henry VIII's third wife. In 1537, she married courtier and diplomat Peter Meutas. Lady Meutas's oval medallion is similar to a design for a Penitent Mary Magdalene medallion in the Kunstmuseum Basel in Basel, Switzerland.	
	Mary Monteagle	c. 1538 – c. 1540	Black and coloured chalks, pen and ink, and brush and ink on pink prepared paper.	29.7 × 20.0 cm	Lady Mary Brandon, Baroness Monteagle was a lady-in-waiting to Jane Seymour, third wife of Henry VIII. She was the daughter of Charles Brandon, 1st Duke of Suffolk and wife of Thomas Stanley, 2nd Lord Monteagle. She was formerly identified as the sitter for two portrait miniatures by Holbein, one in the Royal collection and one in the Strawberry Hill House, part of the Buccleuch collection.	
	John More	c. 1526 – c. 1527	Black and coloured chalks.	35.1 × 27.3 cm	Sir John More, aged 76, was the father of Thomas More. He was a lawyer and a judge. The drawing is one of the eight individual portrait studies for a group portrait of Thomas More's family preserved in the Royal Collection. Destroyed by fire at the Kremsier Castle (Czech Republic) in 1752, its appearance is preserved in an annotated drawing by Holbein, now in Kunstmuseum Basel. There are also several later copies, including three 1592–1594 versions by Rowland Lockey: a watercolor miniature in the Victoria and Albert Museum and two oils on canvas, one in the National Portrait Gallery, and one at the Nostell Priory, West Yorkshire. The same series includes three drawings of his grandchildren: one of Cicely Heron, one of Elizabeth Dauncey, and one of John More the Younger. Another drawing, and one similar to it, also from the series, depict his son Thomas More; a related painted portrait is in the Frick Collection, New York. The compositional sketch in Basel also records the likenesses of his granddaughter Margaret Roper (a portrait miniature of her, by Holbein, is in the Metropolitan Museum of Art, New York).	
	John More	c. 1526 – c. 1527	Black and coloured chalks.	38.1 × 28.1 cm	John More, aged 19, was the son of Thomas More. The drawing is one of the eight individual portrait studies for a group portrait of Thomas More's family preserved in the Royal Collection. Destroyed by fire at the Kremsier Castle (Czech Republic) in 1752, its appearance is preserved in an annotated drawing by Holbein, now in Kunstmuseum Basel. There are also several later copies, including three 1592–1594 versions by Rowland Lockey: a watercolor miniature in the Victoria and Albert Museum and two oils on canvas, one in the National Portrait Gallery, and one at the Nostell Priory, West Yorkshire. The series also includes a drawing of his wife Anne Cresacre and two drawings of his sisters, one of Cicely Heron, and one of Elizabeth Dauncey; a further one depicts his grandfather John More the Elder. Another drawing, and one similar to it, also from the series, depict his father; a related painted portrait is in the Frick Collection, New York. The compositional sketch in Basel also records the likenesses of his sister Margaret Roper (a portrait miniature of her, by Holbein, is in the Metropolitan Museum of Art, New York).	
	Thomas More	c. 1526 – c. 1527	Black and coloured chalks, the outlines pricked for transfer.	39.8 × 29.9 cm	The sitter is Sir Thomas More. This drawing is a study for a painted portrait by Holbein in the Frick Collection, New York. Another drawing similar to this one is also in the Royal Collection. The painting and the drawings relate to a group portrait of Thomas More's family. Destroyed by fire at the Kremsier Castle (Czech Republic) in 1752, its appearance is preserved in an annotated drawing by Holbein, now in Kunstmuseum Basel. There are also several later copies, including three 1592–1594 versions by Rowland Lockey: a watercolor miniature in the Victoria and Albert Museum and two oils on canvas, one in the National Portrait Gallery, and one at the Nostell Priory, West Yorkshire. Six more drawings executed by Holbein in preparation for the group portrait survive, all in the Royal Collection. One is of Thomas More's father Sir John More; another is of his son John More the Younger; the third records the likeness of his ward and daughter-in-law, John's wife Anne Cresacre; the fourth and the fifth — that of his daughters Cicely Heron and Elizabeth Dauncey; finally, there is one of his foster daughter Margaret Giggs. The compositional sketch in Basel also depicts his wife Lady Alice More(a related painted portrait, attributed to Holbein's studio, is at the Weiss Gallery in London), his daughter Margaret Roper (a portrait miniature of her, by Holbein, is in the Metropolitan Museum of Art, New York), and his household fool Henry Patenson.	
	Thomas More	c. 1526 – c. 1527	Black and coloured chalks, and brown wash.	37.6 × 25.5 cm	The sitter is Sir Thomas More. This drawing is very similar to another one, also in the Royal Collection, which is thought to be a study for a painted portrait by Holbein in the Frick Collection, New York. The painting and the drawings relate to a group portrait of Thomas More's family. Destroyed by fire at the Kremsier Castle (Czech Republic) in 1752, its appearance is preserved in an annotated drawing by Holbein, now in Kunstmuseum Basel. There are also several later copies, including three 1592–1594 versions by Rowland Lockey: a watercolor miniature in the Victoria and Albert Museum and two oils on canvas, one in the National Portrait Gallery, and one at the Nostell Priory, West Yorkshire. Six more drawings executed by Holbein in preparation for the group portrait survive, all in the Royal Collection. One is of Thomas More's father Sir John More; another is of his son John More the Younger; the third records the likeness of his ward and daughter-in-law, John's wife Anne Cresacre; the fourth and the fifth — that of his daughters Cicely Heron and Elizabeth Dauncey; finally, there is one of his foster daughter Margaret Giggs. The compositional sketch in Basel also depicts his wife Lady Alice More (a related painted portrait, attributed to Holbein's studio, is at the Weiss Gallery in London), his daughter Margaret Roper (a portrait miniature of her, by Holbein, is in the Metropolitan Museum of Art, New York), and his household fool Henry Patenson.	
	Grace Parker	c. 1540 – c. 1543	Black and coloured chalks on pale pink prepared paper.	29.8 x 20.8 cm	Grace Newport formally identified as Jane Boleyn Lady Rochford.	
	William Parr	c. 1538 – c. 1542	Black and coloured chalks, white bodycolour, pen and ink, and brush and ink on pale pink prepared paper.	31.7 × 21.2 cm	William Parr, 1st Marquess of Northampton was the brother of Catherine Parr, the sixth wife of Henry VIII. A drawing sometimes identified as of his sister Anne Herbert, Countess of Pembroke, by Holbein, is also in the Royal Collection.	
	Thomas Parry	c. 1532 – c. 1543	Black and coloured chalks, and pen and ink on pale pink prepared paper.	25.1 × 18.5 cm	Sir Thomas Parry was an English courtier who went on to become the Comptroller of the Household to Elizabeth I.	
	John Poyntz	c. 1532 – c. 1543	Black and coloured chalks, pen and ink, and brush and ink on pale pink prepared paper.	29.5 × 23.3 cm	John Poyntz was an English courtier and politician. A similar drawing, attributed to Holbein, is in the Metropolitan Museum of Art, New York. A drawing of his nephew Nicholas Poyntz, by Holbein, is also in the Royal Collection.	
	Nicholas Poyntz	c. 1533 – c. 1543	Black and coloured chalks, and pen and ink on pale pink prepared paper.	28.4 × 18.3 cm	The sitter is Sir Nicholas Poyntz. He was a prominent courtier during the later part of Henry VIII's reign and commanded the warship the Great Galley during the war of the Rough Wooing. This drawing is a study for a painted portrait, now lost; several 16th-century copies survive, including a reduced version in the National Portrait Gallery, London, and a full one at the Sandon Hall, Staffordshire, owned by the Earls of Harrowby; a 17th-century copy is at Ickworth House near Bury St Edmunds, Suffolk. Another drawing in the Royal Collection, by a follower of Holbein, was formerly thought to be by Holbein and of Poyntz. A drawing of his uncle John Poyntz is also in the Royal Collection; a similar drawing, attributed to Holbein, is in the Metropolitan Museum of Art, New York.	
	Lady Ratcliffe	c. 1532 – c. 1543	Black and coloured chalks, pen and ink, brush and ink, and metalpoint on pale pink prepared paper.	30.1 × 20.3 cm	The precise identity of the sitter is unknown. Robert Radcliffe, 1st Earl of Sussex had three wives, the third one, prominent courtier Mary Arundell being the most likely candidate. The wife of the Earl's third son Sir Humphrey Radcliffe has also been suggested.	
	Elizabeth Rich	c. 1532 – c. 1543	Black and coloured chalks, pen and ink, and metalpoint on pale pink prepared paper.	37.4 × 30.3 cm	Elizabeth, Lady Rich was the wife of Richard Rich, 1st Baron Rich. A related painted portrait by the workshop of Holbein is in the Metropolitan Museum of Art, New York. A drawing of her husband, by Holbein, is also in the Royal Collection.	
	Richard Rich	c. 1532 – c. 1543	Black and coloured chalks, and pen and ink on pale pink prepared paper.	32.2 × 26.2 cm	The sitter is Richard Rich, 1st Baron Rich. A prominent court official, he eventually rose to become the Lord Chancellor during the reign of Edward VI. The drawing is a study for a painted portrait, now lost; the last known copy was destroyed by fire at Knepp Castle in West Grinstead, Sussex, in 1904. A drawing of his wife, Lady Elizabeth Rich, by Holbein, is also in the Royal Collection; a related painting by Holbein's workshop is in the Metropolitan Museum of Art.	
	Francis Russell	c. 1534 – c. 1538	Black and coloured chalks, and pen and ink on pale pink prepared paper.	23.9 × 17.9 cm	The sitter is Francis Russell, 2nd Earl of Bedford. A drawing of his father, John Russell, 1st Earl of Bedford, by Holbein, is also in the Royal Collection.	
	John Russell	c. 1532 – c. 1543	Black and coloured chalks, and white bodycolour on pale pink prepared paper.	34.9 × 29.2 cm	John Russell, 1st Earl of Bedford was an important court official, serving as Lord High Admiral and later Lord Privy Seal; in 1520, he was present at the embassy of the Field of the Cloth of Gold and lost an eye during the Siege of Morlaix of 1522. A drawing of his son, Francis Russell, 2nd Earl of Bedford, by Holbein, is also in the Royal Collection.	
	Jane Seymour	c. 1536 – c. 1537	Black and coloured chalks, pen and ink, and metalpoint, on pale pink prepared paper.	50.0 × 28.5 cm	Jane Seymour was the third wife of Henry VIII and the mother of Edward VI. The drawing is a study for a painted portrait by Holbein in the Kunsthistorisches Museum, Vienna, Austria; a workshop copy, sometimes attributed to Holbein himself, is in the Mauritshuis, The Hague. The portrait also matches the description of Jane in the so-called Whitehall Mural, the now lost Holbein's wall-painting of the Tudor dynasty in the Privy chamber of the Palace of Whitehall; destroyed by fire in 1698, its appearance is recorded in an oil-on-canvas copy by Remigius van Leemput in the Royal Collection. The pear-shaped pendant is the same as seen in two miniatures by Holbein, worn by an unknown sitter, formerly thought to be Jane's lady-in-waiting Mary Brandon, Baroness Monteagle or Henry VIII's fifth wife Catherine Howard; one miniature is preserved in the Royal Collection, while the other is in the Strawberry Hill House, part of the Buccleuch collection.	
	William Sharington	c. 1532 – c. 1543	Black and coloured chalks, and brush and ink on pale pink prepared paper.	30.1 × 20.3 cm	Sir William Sharington was an English courtier, best remembered for his involvement in the Bristol Mint embezzlement scandal.	
	Richard Southwell	1536	Black and coloured chalks, pen and ink, and metalpoint on pale pink prepared paper.	36.6 × 27.7 cm	Sir Richard Southwell was an English courtier and politician. The drawing is a study for a painted portrait by Holbein in Uffizi, Florence. In the drawing, scars on the neck and forehead are so convincingly depicted that they were thought to be imperfections in the paper well into the 1970s, despite them being clearly visible in the Uffizi painting. A note in Holbein's hand adds that Southwell's eyes were "a little yellowish".	
	Edward Stanley	c. 1532 – c. 1543	Black and coloured chalks, pen and ink, and brush and ink on pale pink prepared paper.	28.1 × 19.7 cm	The sitter is Edward Stanley, 3rd Earl of Derby, cup-bearer to Anne Boleyn.	
	Thomas Lestrange	c. 1536	Black and coloured chalks, pen and ink, and metalpoint, on pale pink prepared paper.	24.3 × 21.0 cm	The sitter is Sir Thomas Lestrange, a minor courtier and wealthy landowner. The drawing is related to a painted portrait of Lestrange, by Holbein, in the Kimbell Art Museum, Fort Worth, Texas; a copy by a follower is in a private collection. Royal Collection also has two drawings of his brother-in-law Thomas Vaux, 2nd Baron Vaux of Harrowden, by Holbein, one with short hair and one with long hair.	
	An unidentified man	c. 1532 – c. 1543	Black and coloured chalks, white bodycolour, pen and ink, and brush and ink on pale pink prepared paper.	27.1 × 18.9 cm	The identity of the sitter is unknown. Formally known as George Boleyn. Although there is no evidence to suggest this claim	
	An unidentified man	1535	Black and coloured chalks, white bodycolour, pen and ink, and metalpoint on pale pink prepared paper.	29.8 × 22.2 cm	The identity of the sitter is uncertain; one suggestion is Sir Ralph Sadler, who served as Privy Councillor, Secretary of State and ambassador to Scotland. The drawing is related to a painted portrait, by Holbein's workshop, in the Metropolitan Museum of Art, New York.	
	An unidentified man	c. 1532 – c. 1543	Black and coloured chalks on pale pink prepared paper.	25.9 × 20.1 cm	The identity of the sitter is unknown.	
	An unidentified man	c. 1535	Black and coloured chalks, pen and ink, and brush and ink on pale pink prepared paper.	27.2 × 21.0 cm	The identity of the sitter is unknown. It is possible that the drawing is a study for a roundel or a circular miniature, now lost, but recorded in a 1647 etching by Wenceslaus Hollar.	
	An unidentified woman	c. 1526 – c. 1528	Black and coloured chalks.	35.6 × 24.8 cm	The identity of the sitter is unknown.	
	An unidentified woman	c. 1532 – c. 1543	Black and coloured chalks, pen and ink, and brush and ink on pale pink prepared paper.	28.9 × 21.0 cm	The identity of the sitter is unknown.	
	An unidentified woman	c. 1532 – c. 1543	Black and coloured chalks, white bodycolour, black and brown wash, pen and ink, and brush and ink on pale pink prepared paper.	27.8 × 19.4 cm	The identity of the sitter is unknown.	
	An unidentified woman	c. 1532 – c. 1543	Black and coloured chalks, and pen and ink on pale pink prepared paper.	28.8 × 22.8 cm	The identity of the sitter is unknown.	
	An unidentified woman	c. 1532 – c. 1543	Black and coloured chalks on pale pink prepared paper.	28.5 × 21.8 cm	The identity of the sitter is unknown. One suggestion is Anne Herbert, Countess of Pembroke, lady-in-waiting to all six wives of Henry VIII and sister to the last wife Catherine Parr. A drawing of Anne Herbert's brother William Parr, 1st Marquess of Northampton, by Holbein, is also in the Royal Collection.	
	An unidentified woman	c. 1532 – c. 1543	Black and coloured chalks, and pen and ink on pale pink prepared paper.	27.4 × 20.1 cm	The identity of the sitter is unknown. The portrait is recorded in a circular format in a 1647 etching by Wenceslaus Hollar.	
	An unidentified woman	c. 1526 – c. 1528	Black and coloured chalks.	40.5 × 29.2 cm	The identity of the sitter is unknown.	
	Elizabeth Vaux	c. 1536	Black and coloured chalks, white bodycolour, wash, pen and ink, brush and ink, and metalpoint on pale pink prepared paper.	28.1 × 21.5 cm	Lady Elizabeth Vaux was the wife of Thomas Vaux, 2nd Baron Vaux of Harrowden. The drawing is a study for a painted portrait, now lost, but known through copies; an early-17th-century one is at the Hampton Court Palace, part of the Royal Collection; another one, sometimes attributed to Holbein himself, is in the Prague Castle Picture Gallery, Czech Republic. Royal Collection also has two drawings of her husband, by Holbein, one with short hair and one with long hair.	
	Thomas Vaux	c. 1533	Black and coloured chalks, pen and ink, brush and ink, white and yellow bodycolour, and metalpoint on pale pink prepared paper.	27.9 × 29.5 cm	The sitter is Thomas Vaux, 2nd Baron Vaux of Harrowden, best remembered as a poet. Another drawing of Vaux by Holbein, with shorter hair, is also in the Royal Collection. Royal Collection also has a Holbein's drawing of his wife Lady Elizabeth Vaux; Holbein's painted portrait based on the drawing no longer survives, but is known from copies, including an early-17th-century one at the Hampton Court Palace, part of the Royal Collection, and another one, sometimes attributed to Holbein himself, in the Prague Castle Picture Gallery, Czech Republic. A drawing of his brother-in-law Thomas Lestrange is in the Royal Collection, as well; a related painted portrait, by Holbein, is in the Kimbell Art Museum, Fort Worth, Texas, with an additional copy by a follower in a private collection.	
	Thomas Vaux	c. 1536	Black and coloured chalks on pale pink prepared paper.	29.1 × 20.6 cm	The sitter is Thomas Vaux, 2nd Baron Vaux of Harrowden, best remembered as a poet. Another drawing of Vaux by Holbein, with longer hair, is also in the Royal Collection. Royal Collection also has a Holbein's drawing of his wife Lady Elizabeth Vaux; Holbein's painted portrait based on the drawing no longer survives, but is known from copies, including an early-17th-century one at the Hampton Court Palace, part of the Royal Collection, and another one, sometimes attributed to Holbein himself, in the Prague Castle Picture Gallery, Czech Republic. A drawing of his brother-in-law Thomas Lestrange is in the Royal Collection, as well; a related painted portrait, by Holbein, is in the Kimbell Art Museum, Fort Worth, Texas, with an additional copy by a follower in a private collection.	
	William Warham	1527	Black, white and coloured chalks, and traces of metalpoint.	40.7 × 30.9 cm	William Warham was the Archbishop of Canterbury from 1503 to his death in 1532. The drawing is a study for a painted portrait, by Holbein, in the Louvre, Paris; among the surviving copies are a late-16th-century one at the Lambeth Palace, the official London residence of the Archbishop of Canterbury, and an early-17th-century one in the National Portrait Gallery, London.	
	Thomas Wentworth	c. 1532 – c. 1543	Black and coloured chalks, pen and ink, brush and ink, and metalpoint on pale pink prepared paper.	31.9 × 28.0 cm	Thomas Wentworth, 1st Baron Wentworth was an English courtier who went on to become the Lord Chamberlain under Edward VI.	
	Catherine Willoughby	c. 1532 – c. 1543	Black and coloured chalks, pen and ink, and brush and ink on pale pink prepared paper.	28.9 × 20.9 cm	Catherine Willoughby, 12th Baroness Willoughby de Eresby was the fourth wife of Charles Brandon, 1st Duke of Suffolk. A portrait miniature of Catherine, by Holbein, is at the Grimsthorpe Castle, owned by the Baroness Willoughby de Eresby. Royal Collection is also in possession of two portrait miniatures of her sons, by Holbein, one of Henry Brandon, 2nd Duke of Suffolk, aged around 6, and one of Charles Brandon, 3rd Duke of Suffolk, aged no more than 4.	
	Charles Wingfield	c. 1532 – c. 1540	Black and coloured chalks, and pen and ink on pale pink prepared paper.	28.3 × 19.7 cm	The sitter is Sir Charles Wingfield, son of the influential courtier Sir Richard Wingfield.	
	Thomas Wyatt	c. 1535 – c. 1537	Black and coloured chalks, and pen and ink on pale pink prepared paper.	37.2 × 26.9 cm	The sitter is the court poet Sir Thomas Wyatt. Another drawing of Wyatt, a very skillful copy of this one, perhaps Elizabethan, possibly by Federico Zuccari, is also in the Royal Collection. Holbein also made a painting or drawing of Wyatt in profile, now lost, but recorded in a 1548 woodcut (published in John Leland's Naeniae, elegy in praise of Wyatt, written on his death) and several later copies, including two in the National Portrait Gallery, NPG 1035 and NPG 2809. A painted portrait of his father Sir Henry Wyatt, by Holbein, is in the Louvre, Paris. A painted portrait of his sister Margaret Lee, by Holbein's workshop, is in the Metropolitan Museum of Art, New York.	
	Mary Zouch	c. 1532 – c. 1543	Black and coloured chalks, and pen and ink on pale pink prepared paper.	29.6 × 21.2 cm	The exact identity of the sitter is uncertain; Jane Seymour's lady-in-waiting Mary Zouch and Anne Boleyn's close friend and lady-in-waiting Anne Gainsford have been suggested.	

== Kunstmuseum Basel ==
Work	Title	Date	Medium	Size	Notes	Related works
	Bonifacius Amerbach	c. 1525	Black and coloured chalk, metalpoint.	40.0 × 36.8 cm	Bonifacius Amerbach^{(de)} taught Roman law at Basel University and became a friend of Holbein, as well as of the great humanist scholar Desiderius Erasmus, who made him his sole heir. Amberbach's collection of Holbein, expanded by his son Basilius^{(de)}, formed the core of Kunstmuseum Basel. An earlier painted portrait of Amerbach, by Holbein, is also in Kunstmuseum Basel.	
	Jean de Berry	1523–1524	Black and coloured chalk.	39.6 × 27.5 cm	The drawing was long thought to be a portrait of a living person, until in the 1870s Jacob Burckhardt discovered it was actually a study of a statue of John, Duke of Berry (another drawing by Holbein, also in Kunstmuseum Basel, records the companion statue of the Duke's wife Joan II, Countess of Auvergne). The two sculptures date to around 1400 and are attributed to Jean de Cambrai. Originally, they stood at the sides of the Altar of Notre-Dame la Blanche in the chapel of Sainte-Chapelle^{(fr)}, Bourges, that Holbein evidently visited during his trip to France in 1523–1524 (see 1921 reconstruction drawing of the sculptural group). Saint-Chapelle was damaged by fire in 1693 and demolished in 1757; the sculptures were moved to the Bourges Cathedral, where they stand to this day. During the French Revolution, in 1793, the statue was badly damaged and its head was broken off (the one currently on display in the cathedral is an 1844 replacement by the local sculptor Jules Dumoutet). The much-damaged original head is preserved in Musée du Berry, Palais Jacques-Cœur^{(fr)}, Bourges; it appears very similar to the head of the Duke's effigy, also by Jean de Cambrai, preserved in situ in the Bourges Cathedral.	
	Jeanne d'Auvergne	1523–1524	Black and coloured chalk.	39.6 × 27.5 cm	The drawing was long thought to be a portrait of a living person, until in the 1870s Jacob Burckhardt discovered it was actually a study of a statue of Joan II, Countess of Auvergne, wife of John, Duke of Berry, a companion statue of whom Holbein also sketched (the drawing is in Kunstmuseum Basel, as well). The two sculptures date to around 1400 and are attributed to Jean de Cambrai. Originally, they stood at the sides of the Altar of Notre-Dame la Blanche in the chapel of Sainte-Chapelle^{(fr)}, Bourges, that Holbein evidently visited during his trip to France in 1523–1524 (see 1921 reconstruction drawing of the sculptural group). Saint-Chapelle was damaged by fire in 1693 and demolished in 1757; the sculptures were moved to the Bourges Cathedral, where they stand to this day. During the French Revolution, in 1793, the statue was badly damaged and its head was broken off (the one currently on display is a 1913 replacement based on the Holbein's drawing). Jeanne's characteristic costume has been reused by Holbein in the Duchess woodcut from the Danse Macabre series of 1525.	
	Nicholas Carew	1527	Black and coloured chalk.	54.8 × 38.5 cm	Sir Nicholas Carew was a prominent courtier and renowned jouster, executed in 1539 for his alleged part in the Exeter Conspiracy. A related painted portrait of Nicholas Carew, wearing a full jousting set of Greenwich armour, by Holbein, is in the Drumlanrig Castle, part of the Buccleuch collection. Two drawings of his kinsmen, by Holbein, are preserved in the Royal Collection, one of Sir Gavin Carew and one of the Admiral Sir George Carew; a related circular painting of George Carew, by Holbein (circle of), is in Weston Park, owned by the Earls of Bradford.	
	Mary Guildford	1527	Black and coloured chalks.	55.2 × 38.5 cm	Lady Mary Guildford was the daughter of Sir Sir Edward Wotton and the second wife of Sir Henry Guildford, one of Henry VIII's closest friends. The drawing is related to a painted portrait of Mary, by Holbein, in the Saint Louis Art Museum; a 16th-century copy, long thought to be the original before the discovery of the Saint Louis painting, is in the Metropolitan Museum of Art, New York. A drawing of her first husband Sir Henry Guildford, as well as a related painted portrait, both by Holbein, are in the Royal Collection. A drawing of her second husband Sir Gavin Carew is also in the Royal Collection.	
	Anna Meyer	c. 1525 – c. 1526	Black and coloured chalks with lead point on light green background.	39.1 × 27.5 cm		
	Dorothea Meyer	c. 1525 – c. 1526	Black and coloured chalks with lead point on white-primed paper.	39.5 × 28.1 cm		
	Dorothea Meyer	1516	Silverpoint, red chalk, and traces of black pencil on white-coated paper.	29.3 × 20.1 cm		
	Jakob Meyer	c. 1525 – c. 1526	Black and coloured chalks with lead point on light green background.	38.3 × 27.5 cm	Preparatory for the Double Portrait of Jakob Meyer zum Hasen and Dorothea Kannengießer	
	Jakob Meyer	1516	Silverpoint, red chalk, and traces of black pencil on white-coated paper.	28.1 × 19.0 cm		

== See also ==
- List of paintings by Hans Holbein the Younger
