= Sir Thomas More and Family =

Lost painting by Hans Holbein the Younger

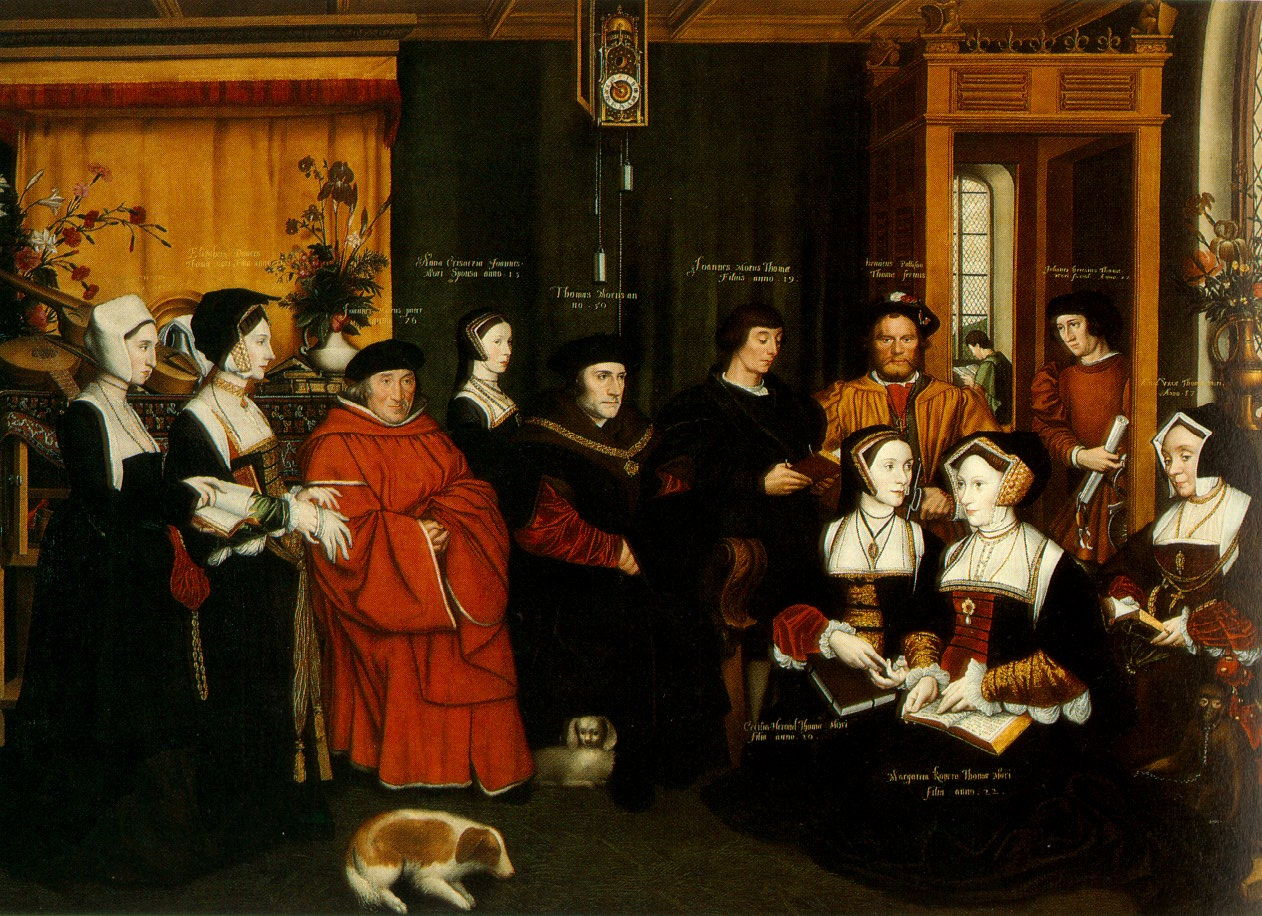
Rowland Lockey after Hans Holbein the Younger, ‘‘Sir Thomas More and his Family’’ (Nostell Priory version, 1592)

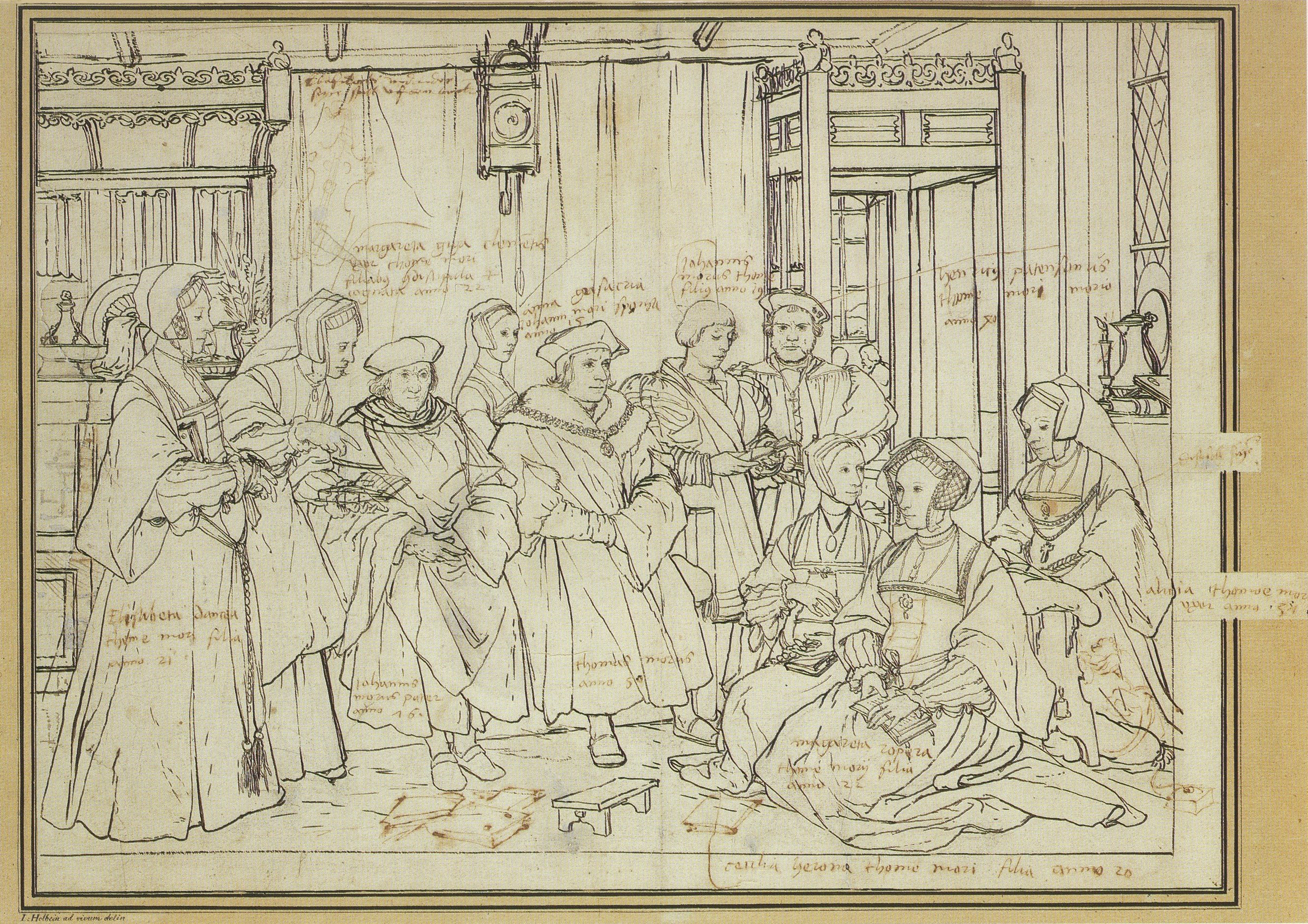
Study for a portrait of Thomas More’s family, c. 1527, by Hans Holbein the Younger (Kunstmuseum Basel)

Sir Thomas More and His Family is a lost painting by Hans Holbein the Younger, created circa 1527 during Holbein’s first visit to England. The work depicted the noted statesman and scholar Sir Thomas More, his immediate family, and other members of his household. While the original painting was destroyed in a fire in 1752, at Schloss Kremsier (Kroměříž Castle), the Moravian residence of Carl von Liechtenstein, Archbishop of Olmutz, its composition is known through a number of surviving copies and studies. The painting is known for demonstrating the interplay of Sir Thomas More's private and public life.

== Background and commission ==
Hans Holbein the Younger moved to England in 1526-28 from Basle, Switzerland. On Holbein's first visit to England, he carried a letter of introduction from the Dutch humanist Erasmus of Rotterdam introducing him to scholar and statesman Sir Thomas More. More commissioned Hans Holbein the Younger for a group portrait of his family. Holbein’s portrait of More and his family is considered one of his most significant English works, reflecting both his technical skill and the intellectual values of More’s household. The portrait was commissioned at a time when More was serving as Lord Chancellor to Henry VIII and is thought to represent the family’s piety, learning, and civic responsibility—core values of Renaissance humanism. More later became known as a Catholic martyr after his execution in 1535 due to his refusal to accept Henry VIII as head of the church.

== Description and composition ==
The painting depicted Sir Thomas More surrounded by his family in a domestic setting, an innovative composition for its time. The figures are arranged in what art historian Roy Strong described as a "conversation piece," with each family member shown engaging in intellectual or scholarly activities. This format, where subjects interact with each other rather than the viewer, was ahead of its time and became a model for future English portraiture. Holbein’s precise and naturalistic style captured not only physical likenesses but also the personalities and inner lives of his subjects.

In Holbein's sketch, Thomas More sits surrounded by his family, who are, from left to right: his daughter Elizabeth, his adopted daughter Margaret Giggs, his father Sir John, sitting next to Thomas, behind whom stand his daughter-in-law Anne Cresacre and his son John, More's heir; the three women seated on the right are his youngest daughter Cecily, his daughter Margaret and his wife Alice, up whose skirt is climbing a tame monkey. Finally, standing by the exit, on the right, is Henry Patenson (or Patensen), the jester in the family's service. The arrangement of the characters is slightly different in Lockey's first copy, and it is likely that this and other differences had already been inserted in Holbein's original painting, partly at the request of the patron.

Overall, the composition produces a centrifugal effect from the point where Thomas More and his father are placed towards the lateral parts, dominated by the more lively female world. The clock hanging in a central position, already present in the drawing, provides a symmetry that in the lost painting increased the effect of magnificence, as is evident through the Lockey copies.

In particular, the artist may have interpreted an epistle entitled "portrait" and sent by Erasmus to Ulrich von Hutten eight years earlier, in which More's characteristics and the curiosities of his family entourage are described, such as his love for animals and the movements of the monkey. Similarly, Henry's presence would confirm the humanist's sympathy for clowns and jokes. Holbein seems to have captured the warmth and intimacy of the family environment, whose concentration would represent the true subject of the painting. The connection with Erasmus' letter is parallel to a new conception of portraiture, understood as a pictorial equivalent of biography, different from the conventions that had until then characterised the Renaissance ceremonial of this type of paintings.

The portrait would therefore constitute the first scene of English conversation ante litteram, due to the informal atmosphere and domestic setting that will be found only later, for example in the works of William Hogarth or Johann Zoffany. The hypothesis, advanced by some critics, that Holbein drew inspiration from Andrea Mantegna's Camera degli Sposi is not supported by documents that certify the artist's presence in Mantua. Furthermore, the narrative intent expressed by the fresco is different from that contained in Holbein's work, capable of reawakening in Erasmus the memory of distant friends.

The painting is a tribute to the intellectual profile not only of the humanist, but also of his family, represented as a sort of academy, in which women are treated equally. The musical instruments on the left, more visible in the painting than in the drawing, would indicate both the love of music and the harmony of the family. The books scattered on the floor could be understood in a similar way: perhaps a reference to the tendency towards disorder that Erasmus attributed to More, but more probably a tribute to the culture and passion for reading that unites the characters depicted. The hypothesis that it is instead a moment of prayer would not be reliable, or perhaps an initial setting later abandoned by the artist and the client, especially due to the desacralising presence of the monkey. As in Lockey's reproduction, in Holbein's lost painting it is likely that the books on the floor had already been replaced by the little dogs, which, together with the more disciplined monkey, help to provide a sense of order and better suit the solemnity of the portrait.

In any case, the painting is not intended to provide a simple fragment of the daily life of the More family, but rather presents a construction specifically designed to bring out hidden characteristics of the protagonists, in which even the objects convey refined symbolic allusions, now only partially understandable. This is demonstrated first of all by the absence of some of the relatives, who shared the same roof: an omission not due to incompatibility of character, but rather to dynastic needs, which exclude direct descendants, and which justify the decentralized position of More's wife. Furthermore, the posture and attitude of the latter evoke the atmosphere of a throne room, as does his clothing, which reproduces the official one of the single portraits. In this way the painter reproduces the social identity of the man, and not only his domestic reality. At the time, moreover, the difference between public and private profile was not as marked as it would become in the future, and this justifies the analogy between the two portraits, consistent with the Renaissance taste for ceremonial.

== Destruction ==
In 1752, the original painting was destroyed in a fire at Schloss Kremsier (Kroměříž Castle), the Moravian residence of Carl von Liechtenstein, archbishop of Olomouc. The fire also destroyed a significant number of other valuable artworks housed at the castle. The loss of Holbein’s original is considered a major cultural tragedy, as it was regarded as one of the finest examples of early English Renaissance portraiture.Guy, John (2009). ‘‘A Daughter’s Love: Thomas More and his Dearest Meg’’. Houghton Mifflin Harcourt. p.172.

== Legacy ==
Roy Strong, a prominent British art historian, called Sir Thomas More and His Family “arguably the greatest and most innovative work of [Holbein’s] English period.” Strong also described it as “the earliest portrait conversation piece in English painting, at least a century ahead of its time,” and noted that “its destruction means we lost the greatest single visual artefact to epitomize the aims and ideals of the early Renaissance in England.”

Despite the loss, the painting has left a lasting impact on the development of portraiture, particularly in England. Its composition, focusing on intellectual and familial relationships, set a precedent for future depictions of domestic life. The portrait continues to be referenced in discussions of Renaissance art and the portrayal of humanist ideals.

== Cultural influences ==
The painting is described in Wolf Hall, a historical novel by Hilary Mantel about the rise to power of Thomas Cromwell that won the 2009 Man Booker Prize:

The favorite, Meg, sits at her father's feet with a book on her knee. Gathered loosely about the Lord Chancellor are his son John; his ward Anne Cresacre, who is John's wife; Margaret Giggs, who is also his ward; his aged father, Sir John More; his daughters Cecily and Elizabeth; Pattinson, with goggle eyes; and his wife, Alice, with lowered head and wearing a cross, at the edge of the picture. Master Holbein has grouped them under his gaze, filed them forever: as long as no moth consumes, no flame or mould or blight.

== Surviving copies and versions ==
Although the original painting was destroyed, several sixteenth-century copies and Holbien's annotated preparatory sketches have survived. One of the most notable copies was produced by Rowland Lockey (active 1593-1616) in 1592. Lockey’s versions, held in collections such as Nostell Priory, the V&A and the National Portrait Gallery, provide valuable insights into Holbein’s composition. These copies closely follow the original design, with slight variations in the arrangement of the figures and details of the setting.

A preparatory drawing by Holbein for the painting, now in the collection of the Kunstmuseum Basel Switzerland (Kupferstichkabinett Inv. 1662.31), also survives. This study offers a glimpse of Holbein’s creative process and the care he took in capturing the likenesses of More’s family.

Two studies exist of More at Windsor. There are also six surviving head studies of connected with the family group. There are also large portraits of More alone, likely made for Holbein's single portrait of Thomas More. Holbein or More sent a small preparatory drawing to Erasmus, which survives.

== Rowland Lockey's reproductions ==
Rowland Lockey was a painter and goldsmith who was active from 1593-1616. He mainly worked as a copyist of earlier portraits. In 1590 Thomas More II acquired Hans Holbein's original painting Sir Thomas More and Family (1527-8). More II then commissioned Rowland Lockey to make three versions of the painting- a copy of the original (now at Nostell Priory), and two of More II's own family. The National Portrait Gallery owns the larger picture, while the Victoria and Albert Museum has the miniature version.

=== Nostell Priory version ===
The painting at Nostell Priory is more or less an exact reproduction of Holbein's original. Holbein's destroyed eighteenth century portrait was copied by Lockey at Nostell Priory, Yorkshire. The version at Nostell Priory is described as "the only faithful, same-size representation of the lost original" and is inscribed “Rolandus Lockey/fecit a.d." dated 1592. It includes other members of his household: More's secretary peeking through a door, his "fool" and his pet monkey.

A new figure has been added, perhaps at the request of Thomas More himself: the secretary John Harris, who peeps out from the entrance on the right. His presence further emphasizes the intellectual inclinations of the family, and at the same time better balances the composition of the painting. Like the jester, Harris is a faithful employee of the humanist, who will have no reason to appear in subsequent versions of the portrait. Both reproductions commissioned by Thomas More's nephew also remodel the family group as a whole, eliminating all those who are not direct blood relatives. Anne Cresacre, the mother of Thomas More II, appears only in the 1593 painting: her portrait in the portrait hangs on the wall on the right, and the face of the young woman from the time of the sketch obviously gives way to that of an older matron.

It is unclear who the artist was, who commissioned it or who originally owned it. A radiocarbon dating test was carried out on 1982 which concluded the flax to be no later than 1520. For this reason, it is highly likely that it predates The National Portrait Gallery's Roland Lockey version of 1593. Lockey was known as an excellent copyist, but his sitters' faces are lacking subtle character details.

Those of the Nostell version—which includes all the sitters—closely resemble the heads of the original Holbein study now preserved in Windsor Castle. The Holbein head studies were acquired by Lord Arundel when he cleared out Holbein's workshop in 1546. It was Lord Arundel's family who later sold the original lost Holbein in 1654, but how they obtained it is unclear.

The art connoisseur of the period Van Mander records that a life-sized portrait by Holbein of Thomas More and his family was owned by Andries de Loo, an avid Holbein collector. He records also that a member of the More family on de Loos's death purchased this same portrait [1590]. This story is also confirmed by the art historian George Virtue, recorded in 1731, referring to the portrait now identified as the Nostell version.

This makes sense if there were in fact two versions done by Holbein. The book above Judge John More's right shoulder is Boethius’s Consolation of Philosophy in which the story parallels Thomas More's arrest and execution, suggesting that the Nostell version reflects More's execution in 1535. It could just be that Holbein was asked by Thomas Cromwell to make a propaganda piece to go with the Great Bible of 1538, Thomas More representing the old order and Cromwell the new.

=== National Portrait Gallery version ===
Rowland Lockey created the painting Sir Thomas More, his father, his household and his decendants in 1593 after Hans Holbein the Younger's Sir Thomas More and Family. The painting is now at National Portrait Gallery in London. The museum acquired in the painting 1935, exactly 400 years after Henry VIII's execution of Sir Thomas More. Lockey's group portrait was probably commissioned by Sir Thomas More's grandson, Thomas More II. The painting depicts five generations of the Roman-Catholic More family. Lockey depicts a fiction, showing living and dead family members together in the same room. Seven of Lockey's figures were derived from Holbein's painting. Lockey added four Elizabethan family members and a painted portrait to the right-hand side of the composition. The added family members are Thomas More II, his sons John and Christopher, and his wife Maria.

Sir Thomas More and Family in the National Portrait Gallery is a painting that was once part of the Lenthall pictures.

==== The picture ====
Sir Thomas More and Family is one of two near life-size copies by Rowland Lockey of an original by Holbein that was lost in a fire in the 18th century. It is dated 1593; Holbein died in 1543. It is oil on canvas and measures 89.5 inches (227 cm) by 120 inches (300 cm). It was probably commissioned by More's grandson, Thomas More II, to commemorate five generations of the family. The National Portrait Gallery lists the sitters as:

- Elizabeth Dauncey (née More) (1506–1564), Second daughter of Sir Thomas More.
- Cecily Heron (née More) (born 1507–1615), Youngest daughter of Sir Thomas More.
- Anne More (née Cresacre) (1511–1577), Wife of John More, son of Sir Thomas More.
- Cresacre More (1572–1649), Great-grandson and biographer of Sir Thomas More.
- Sir John More (circa 1451–1530), in red robes of office as a Judge of the King's Bench; father of Sir Thomas More.
- John More (1510–1547), Son of Sir Thomas More.
- John More (1557–1599?), Eldest son of Thomas More II.
- Maria More (née Scrope) (1534–1607), Wife of Thomas More II.
- Sir Thomas More (1478–1535) wearing his official Tudor Collar of Esses. This part reproduces Holbein's famous portrait of More now at the Frick Collection.
- Thomas More II (1531–1606), Grandson of Sir Thomas More.
- Margaret Roper (1505–1544), Daughter of Sir Thomas More.

The copy from the Lenthall collection has been described as “the most accomplished extant version”.

The surviving drawing by Holbein confirms the general accuracy of the picture.

The scene contrasts the sombre, berobed More and his father, with the messy and lively surrounding family in various demure but relatively informal poses: women, pets, books, and instruments.

==== Provenance ====
The painting had been at Gubbins in Hertfordshire. At some time it came into the possession of the Lenthall family, but how this happened is not known, although it may have been borrowed from the More family and never returned. In the 17th century, John Aubrey viewed it at the Besselsleigh home of Sir John Lenthall, but by 1727 it was at Burford Priory. It was discussed in detail by John Loveday who saw it in 1736. The painting was unsold in a small sale of the Lenthall pictures in 1808 but was offered again and sold in a major sale in 1833. It was subsequently owned by Walter Strickland, CW Dormer, Sir Hugh Lane, Viscount Lee, and EJ Horniman whose widow bequeathed it to the National Portrait Gallery where it remains. It was the centre piece in the exhibition, The King's Good Servant, at the National Portrait Gallery in 1977.

=== Victoria and Albert Museum version ===
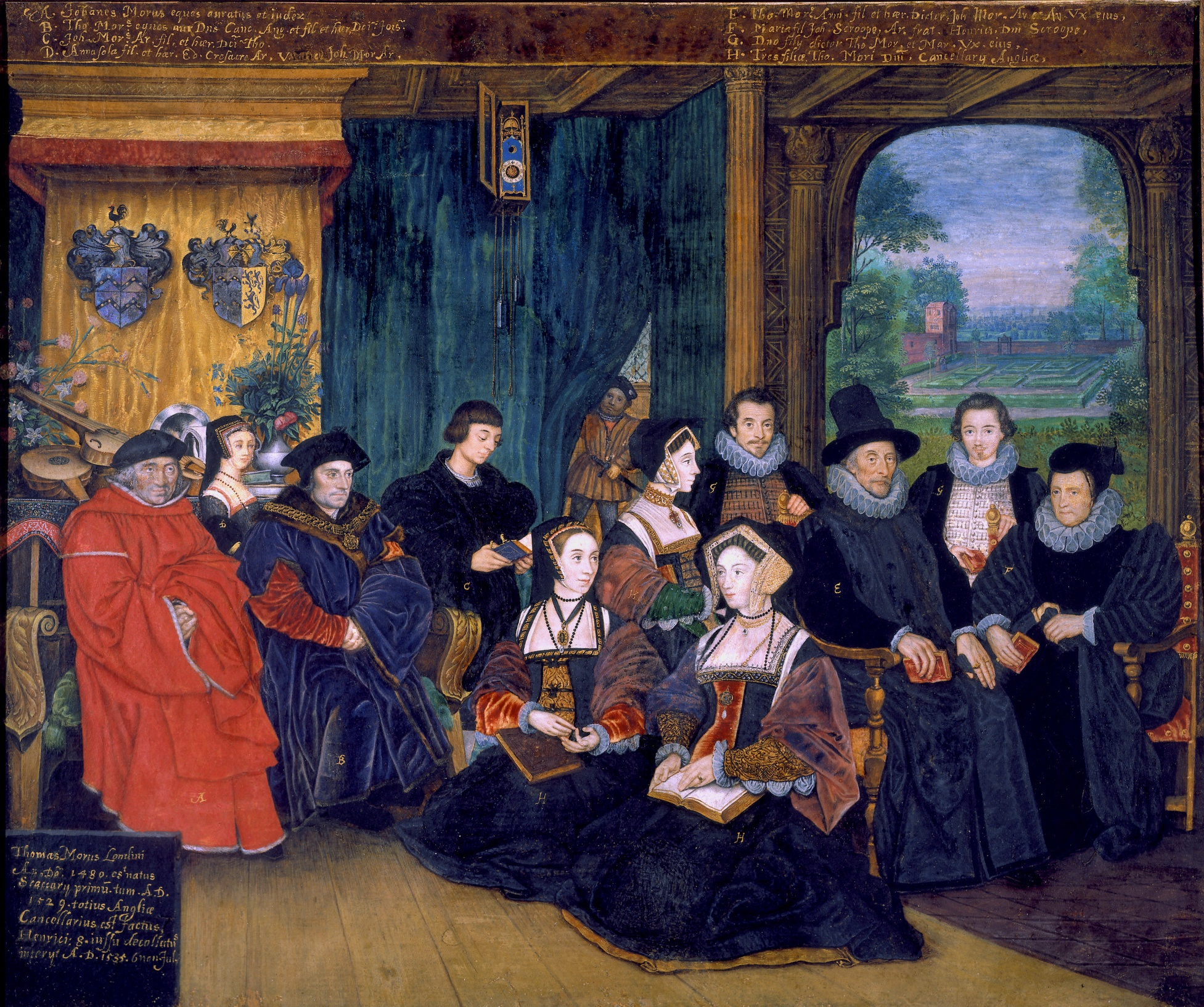
Rowland Lockey after Hans Holbein the Younger, Sir Thomas More and His Family (V&A version, ~1594)

In the miniature kept at the Victoria and Albert Museum, Patenson reappears, depicted as he peeps out from the curtain in the background, after having been excluded from the painting in the National Portrait Gallery. His presence could be justified as a double homage: on the one hand to Thomas More, whose way of treating employees Lockey would demonstrate that he appreciated, not inherited from his nephew, that is, from his own client. On the other hand, the tribute could allude to Holbein's pictorial choices, and to his friendship with Erasmus: by portraying Henry in this attitude, Lockey would give him back one of the archetypal roles of the jesters, that of the critic of society, which is also found in In Praise of Folly.

=== Other Versions ===
A cabinet miniature version of this portrait c. 1594 with different details, also likely to be by Lockey, is in the Victoria and Albert Museum.

Two further copies of the Holbein, at old Chelsea Town Hall (formerly one of the Petre Pictures) and Hendred House, East Hendred, may be by Lockey, but are too damaged and over-painted for any certainty to be possible.

== See also ==
• Hans Holbein the Younger • Thomas More • English Renaissance • Nostell Priory • Rowland Lockey

- List of paintings by Hans Holbein the Younger
- Lost artworks
