= Henry Patenson =

English fool (1487–1543)

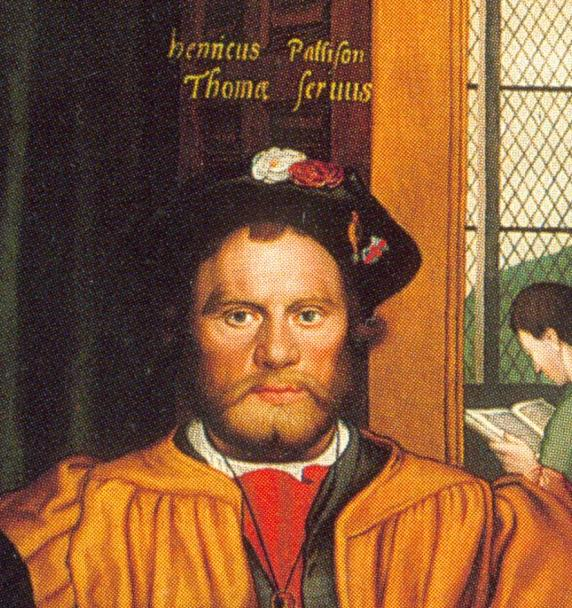
Detail of Henry Patenson in Sir Thomas More and His Family

Henry Patenson (Note: Surname also spelled as Paterson, Patteson, Pattenson, or Pattinson Pattison) (1487–1543) was an English domestic fool (or household jester) who worked in the service of Sir Thomas More from around 1521 to 1532.

== Early life ==
Very little is known for certain about Patenson's childhood and early life. He may have been an apprentice candlemaker before meeting Thomas More and becoming his fool. Other sources claim that Patenson was a mummer who suffered brain damage after falling from a church steeple, resulting in mental disability. Whether Patenson was indeed a natural fool (a fool usually living with intellectual disabilities) or an artificial fool as a result of his mummer background, is a matter of contention among historians. He may also have been homeless before joining More's household, living in an alley off Milk Street due to an impossible commute from his place of origins to Chelsea.

== Career ==
Patenson joined the More household no later than August 1521, where he accompanied Thomas More and Cardinal Wolsey to the Holy Roman Emperor's court at Bruges. More's The Confutation of Tynedale's Answer states that Patenson "was there sone perceuyed vppon the syghte for a man of specyall wytte by hym selfe and vnlyke the comon sorte," suggesting that his possible intellectual disability and natural foolishness was visible. Patenson experienced provocation on this trip due to his appearance. After enduring having several objects thrown at him, Patenson hid some rocks in his coat and jumped upon a table, shouting that anyone who had not thrown anything at him should leave the room. Considering that no one at the court spoke English, they laughed at him, and another object was thrown his way. Patenson retaliated by throwing one of his rocks at a bystander, breaking his skull and drawing blood. Patenson then berated the injured man for not being more careful, considering he had given him fair warning to leave the room. It has been suggested that this account is apocryphal due to its similarity to a passage in the Gospel of John in the Bible, where Jesus Christ says "He that is without sin among you, let him first cast a stone".

At the court, Patenson is reported to have made a poorly received joke about the size of a guest's nose. Realising his mistake, Patenson then went on to claim that the nose was so small that it was barely noticeable.

One of Patenson's roles in the More household was to bring a lighter tone to the serious discussions that the family had after meals. Patenson is mentioned in another of More's Works, namely The Debellation, where More draws a comparison between Patenson and a madman named Cliff.

Patenson is mentioned in a roll of parchment kept by the Lord Treasurer's Remembrancer for Henry VIII for 1523/24, but which appears to have been written much later c. 1531. A seemingly bogus note written for the intent of elaborate comedy, entitled "Still more things to forget, in the wiping of Henry Patenson's bottom in the Exchequer." A dispute between a Henry Patenson and a tallow-chandler named John Hone, who appears to be a successful candlemaker had arisen, in which Patenson is described in the parchment as the "Simperyng fole of london".

Patenson is recorded in 1534 to have commented on his former master's refusal to take Henry VIII's Oath of Supremacy as the head of the Church of England. By this time, Patenson had left the service of More and transferred to the service of the Lord Mayor of London. Margaret Roper, eldest daughter to More, wrote in a letter to Alice Alington, More's stepdaughter, how Patenson became angry with More, stating "Why? What aileth hym [sic] that he wilnot swerve? Wherefore sholde he sticke to swerve? I haue sworne the oth my self". More famously refused to take the oath as he opposed the English Reformation, and was subsequently executed by Henry VIII in 1535.

== In portraiture ==
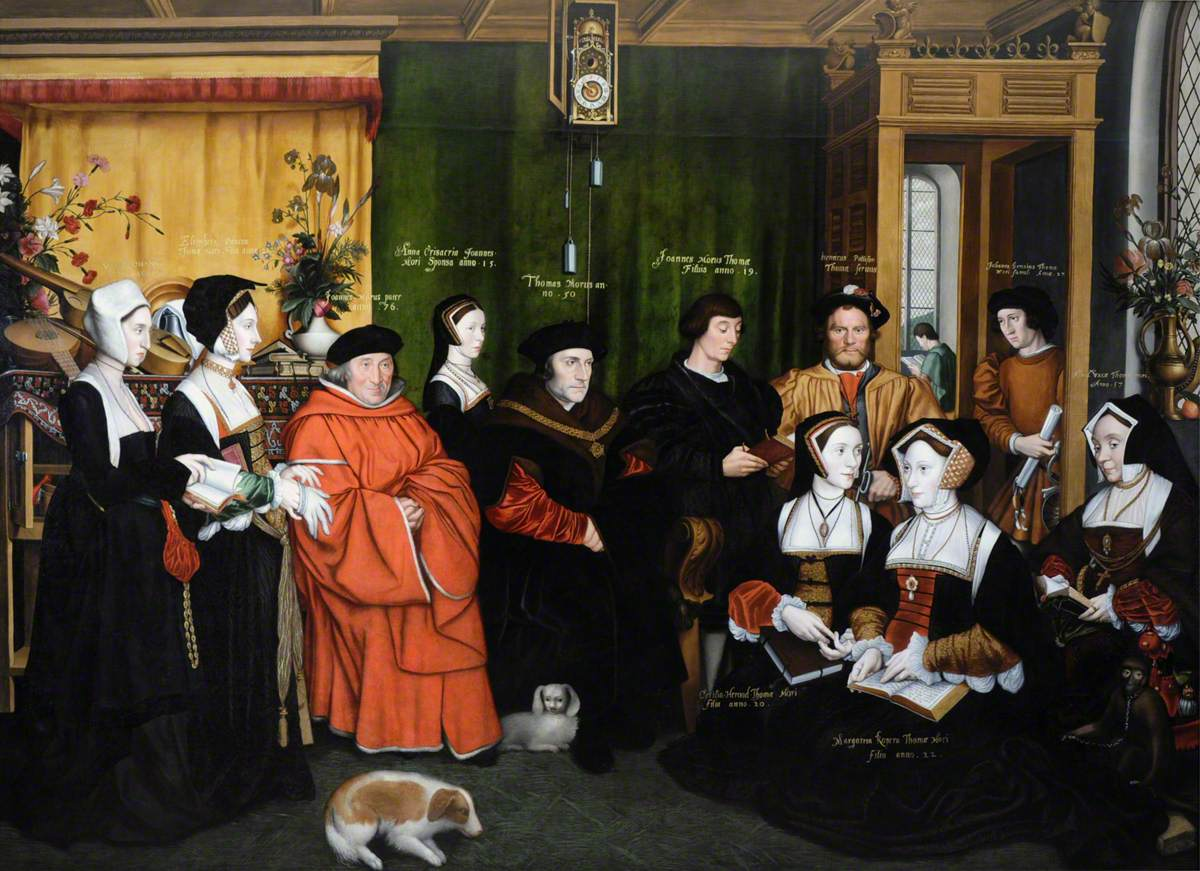
Sir Thomas More and His Family, showing Henry Patenson towards the back of the group

Patenson was painted by Hans Holbein the Younger in 1527 when More commissioned a portrait of his household entitled Sir Thomas More and Family. The painting was created for More's friend, Erasmus of Rotterdam, the author of Praise of Folly. The household fool's inclusion in this portrait was likely to have pleased Erasmus considering his enjoyment of fools. The inclusion of household fools in family portraits was fashionable at the time, and Henry VIII included his own household fools Will Sommers and Jane Foole in his portrait The Family of Henry VIII, likely by Holbein's workshop. A fool's station was often situated between a family member, a servant and a pet. Seemingly revered as one or more of these by the More family, Patenson is placed towards the back of the portrait, behind more prominent members. In the cartoon that precedes this portrait, Patenson is labelled as "Master Harry", seemingly his title in the house. More commonly refers to Patenson as "Master Harry" in his writings about him. The cartoon also states that Patenson was 40 at the time of creation, meaning his birthyear was around 1487. Being the only person to gaze directly out at the audience, Patenson resembled the powerful and intimidating posture that Holbein made famous in his Portrait of Henry VIII, who was also popularly called "Harry", though Holbein would not paint Henry VIII until 1536. Patenson is dressed not in motley as the Medieval jesters did, but in clothing fit for the household, as most English fools such as Will Sommers and Jane Foole were garbed at the time. His intense stare has been noted as "vacant", further alluding to a possible disability.

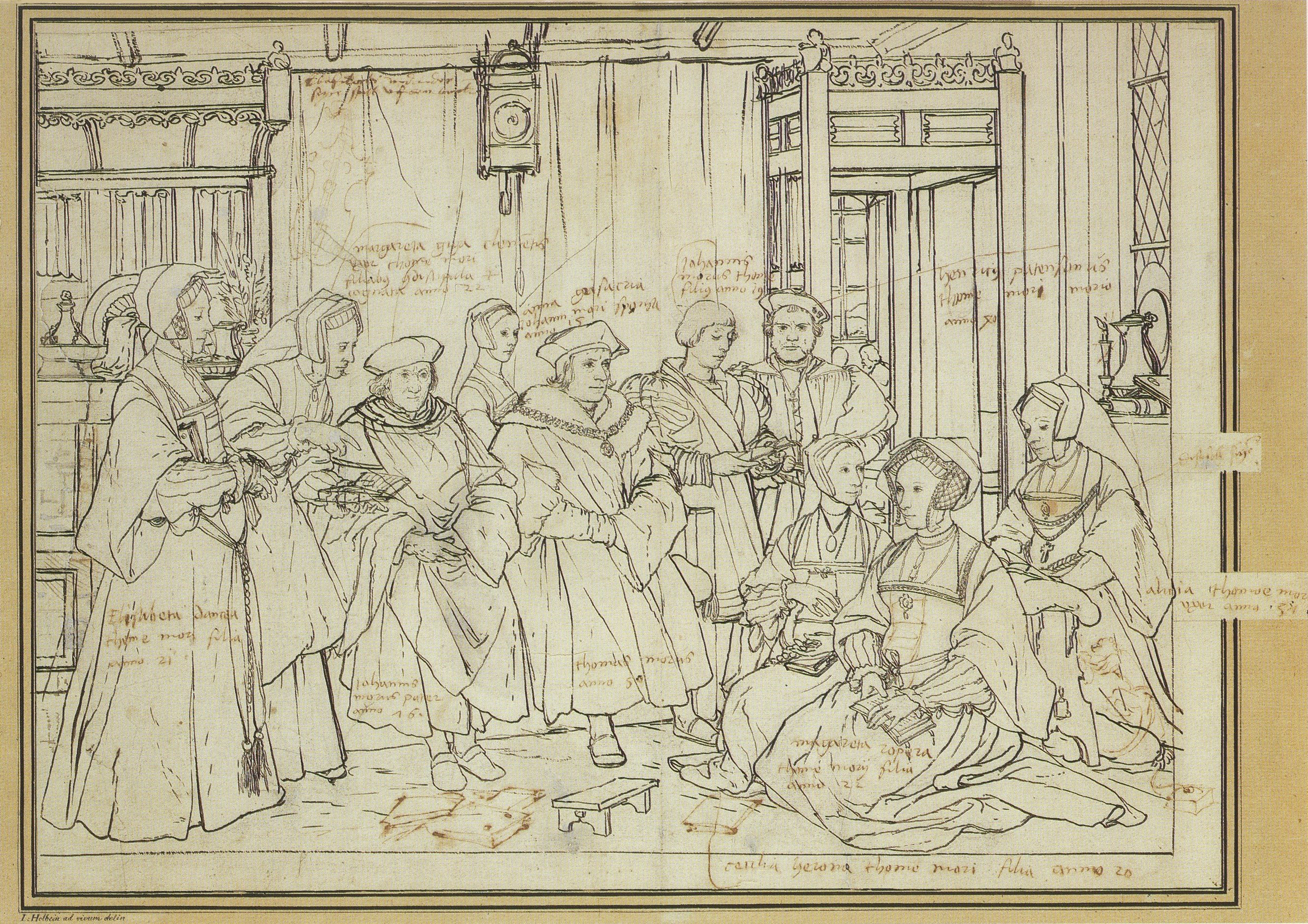
Holbein's preparatory cartoon for Sir Thomas More and His Family

A later rendering of this portrait was created to include some of More's descendants from the Stuart era. Patenson is pushed further into the backdrop of this painting, peering out from behind the curtains. In a third rendition, Patenson is omitted from the picture entirely.

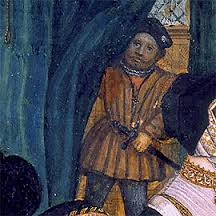
Detail of Henry Patenson in a later rendition of Sir Thomas More and His Family

== After More and death ==
Patenson, along with other household servants, was removed from More's family in 1532 when More gave up his chancellorship. Patenson was given to More's father, Sir John More, and moved again into the employment of the Lord Mayor of London in 1534.

Patenson was buried at St. Lawrence Jewry in London on 31 March 1543.
