= Portrait of an Unknown Gentleman (School of Holbein) =

16th-century painting

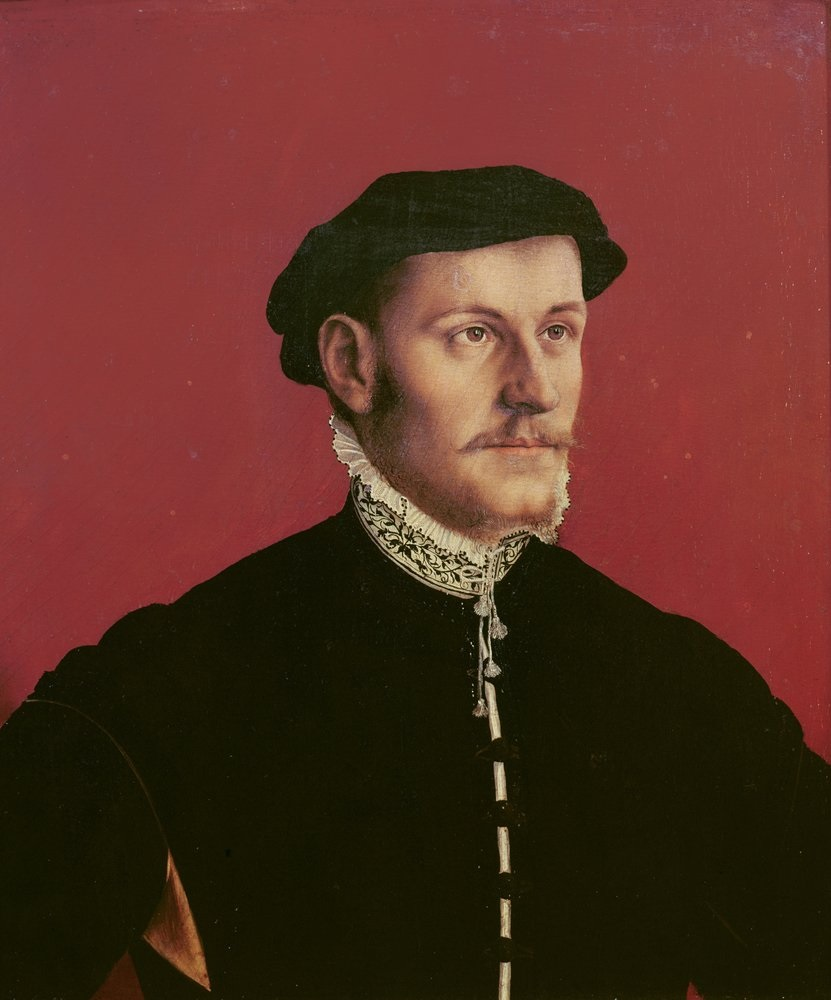
- Artist: studio of Hans Holbein the Younger
- Year: c. 1540
- Dimensions: 42 cm (17 in) × 36 cm (14 in)
- Location: Uffizi
- Accession no.: 1120

Portrait of an Unknown Gentleman is a c.1540 painting of an unknown gentleman by the school or studio of Hans Holbein the Younger. It has traditionally been known as Portrait of Thomas More but it does not fit the iconography of the better-known portrait of the Tudor statesman now in the New York Frick Collection.

== Sources ==
- "Polo Museale Fiorentino - Catalogo delle opere". polomuseale.firenze.it.
