= Rowland Lockey =

English painter (c. 1565–1616)

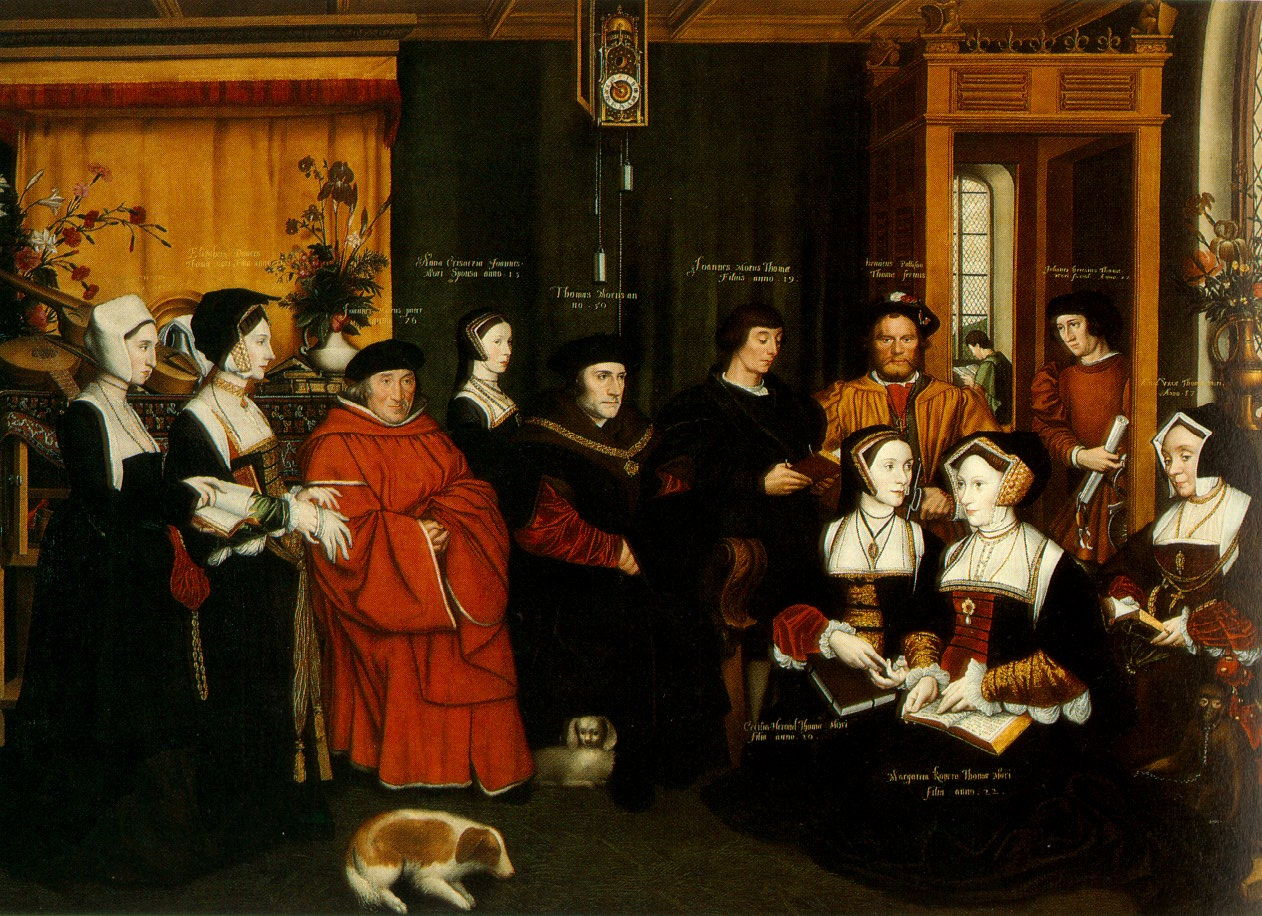
Rowland Lockey after Hans Holbein the Younger, The Family of Sir Thomas More, c. 1594

Rowland Lockey (c. 1565–1616) was an English painter and goldsmith, and was the son of Leonard Lockey, a crossbow maker of the parish of St Bride's, Fleet Street, London. Lockey was apprenticed to Queen Elizabeth's miniaturist and goldsmith Nicholas Hilliard for eight years beginning Michaelmas 1581 and was made a freeman or master of the Worshipful Company of Goldsmiths by 1600.

He worked mainly as a copyist of earlier portraits to make up sets of oil paintings for the fashionable long galleries of great houses, but signed or documented portrait miniatures on vellum and a signed title page engraving for the 1602 Bishops' Bible also survive.

== Versions of Holbein's More family ==
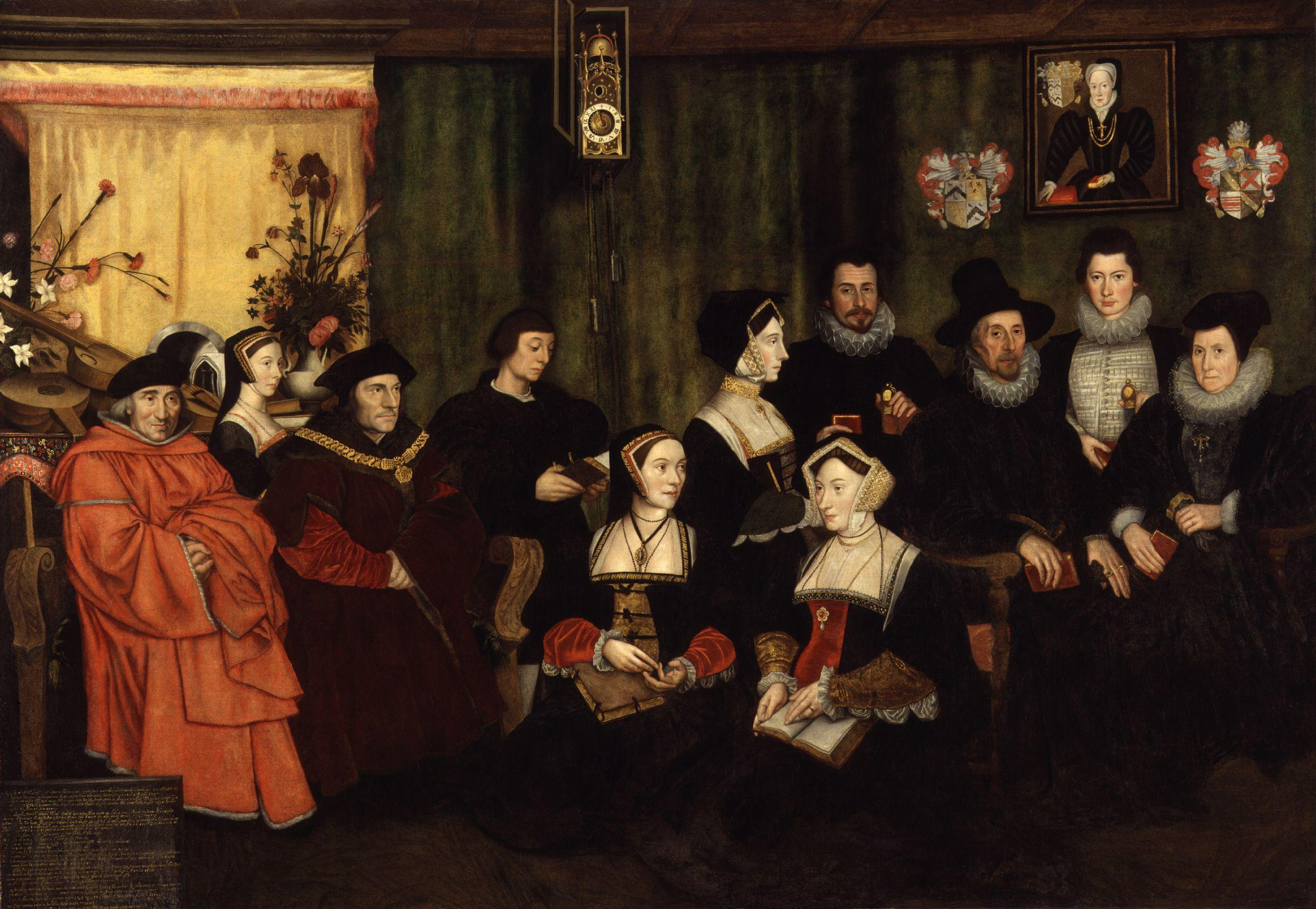
Sir Thomas More, his father, his household and his descendants, oil on canvas, c. 1593

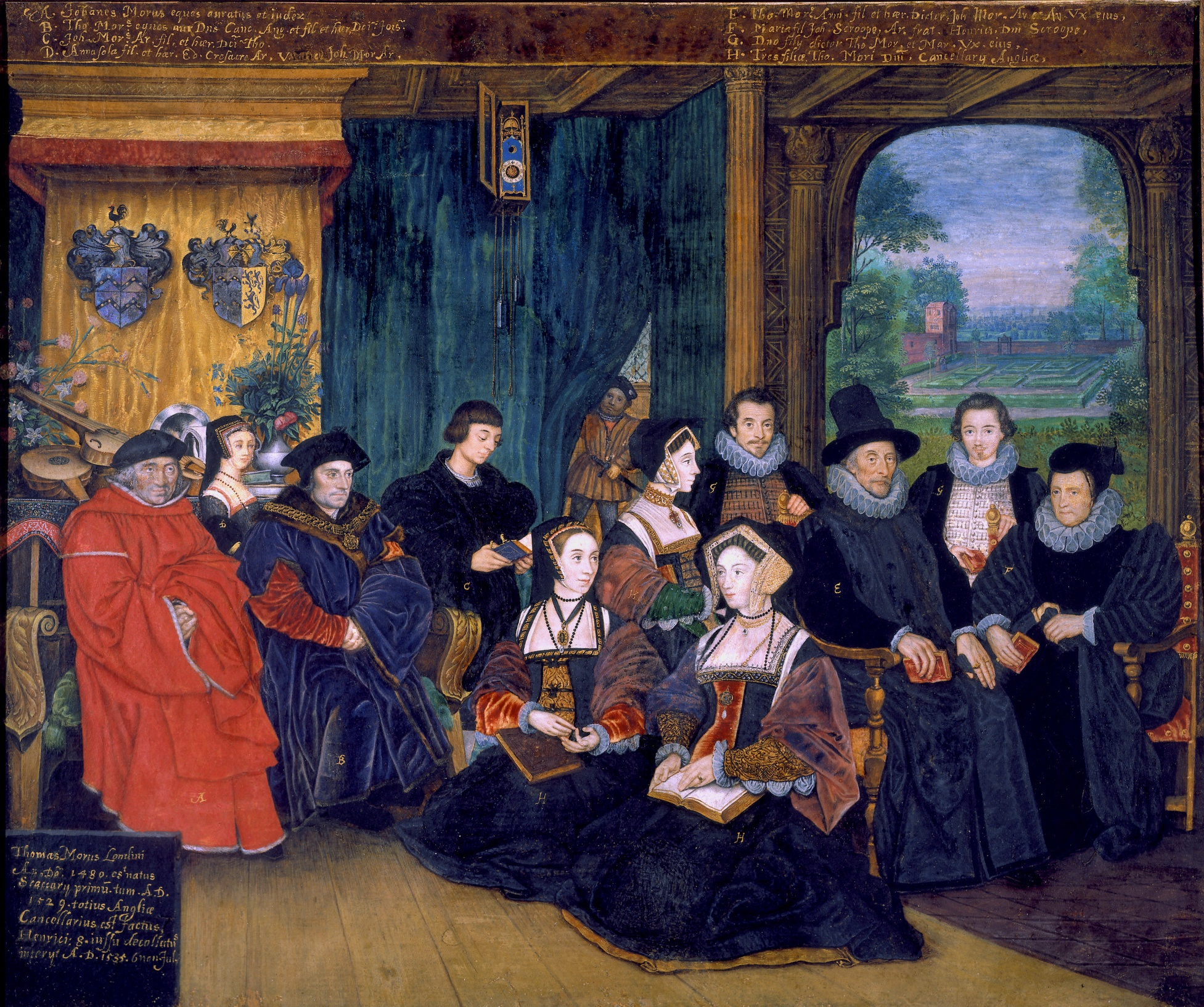
Sir Thomas More and Descendants, miniature, vellum stuck to card, c. 1594

He is best known for his two near life-size copies from the early 1590s of The Family of Sir Thomas More (1527) by Hans Holbein the Younger. The original is now lost–it was destroyed by fire in the eighteenth century. Lockey's versions, which are at Nostell Priory and the National Portrait Gallery in London, differ considerably, as the London version, Sir Thomas More, his father, his household and his descendants, includes More's descendants in their contemporary dress but omits several of the figures in the Holbein original. This was painted around 1593, probably commissioned by More's grandson, Thomas More II, to commemorate five generations of the family. The four figures wearing ruffs and holding prayer books on the right are Thomas More II, his wife and their oldest and youngest sons. Anne More, née Cresacre (1511–77), was Sir Thomas's daughter-in-law, and appears twice: once copied from the Holbein as a young woman of about sixteen (between Sir Thomas and his father) and also as an older woman in the painting on the rear wall. A cabinet miniature version of this portrait c. 1594 with different details, also likely by Lockey, is in the Victoria and Albert Museum. There is also a surviving drawing by Holbein which confirms the general accuracy of the Nostell Priory version.

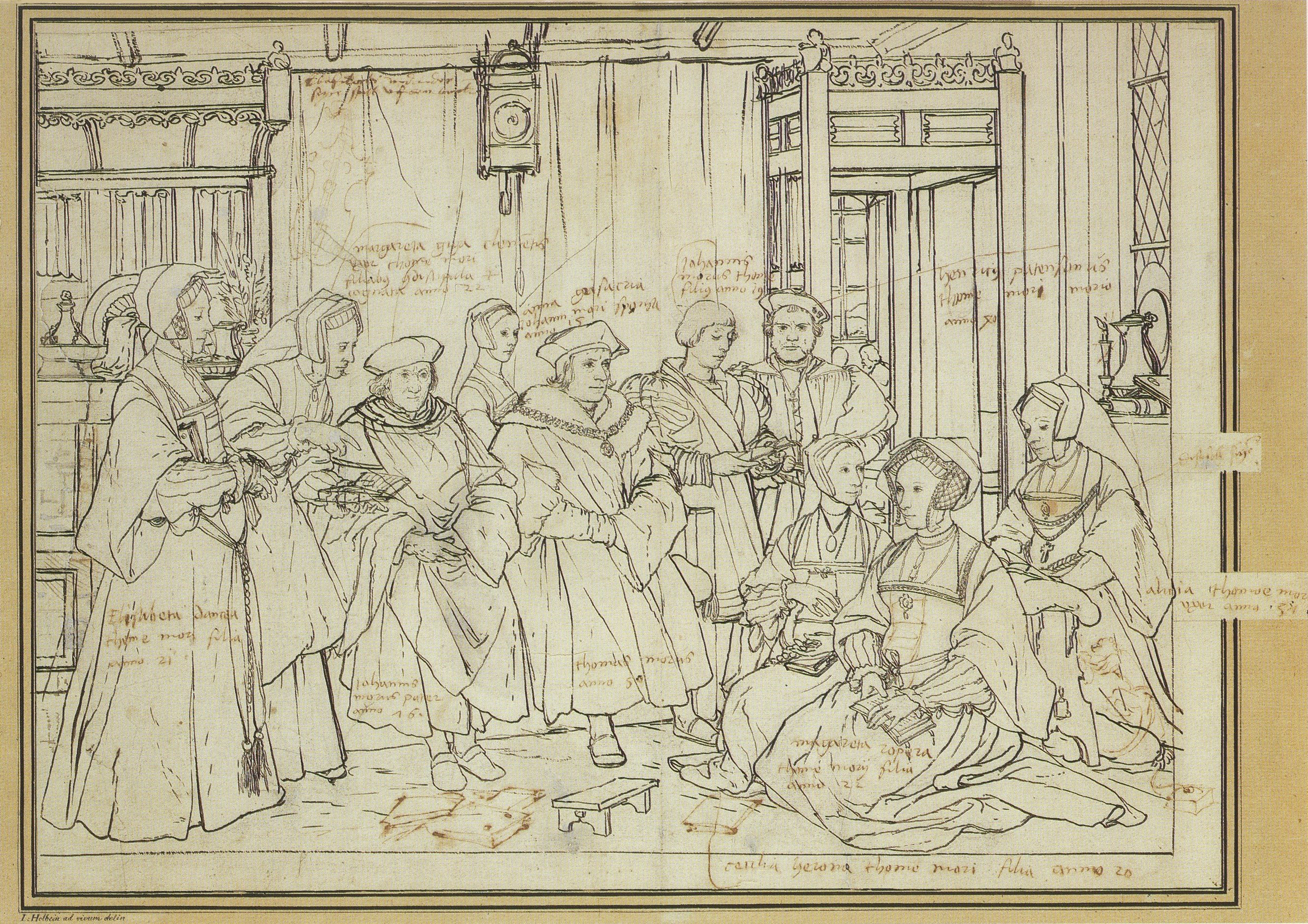
Study by Hans Holbein the Younger for the now lost group portrait of the Sir Thomas More family

Two further copies of the Holbein, at old Chelsea Town Hall and Hendred House, East Hendred, may be by Lockey, but are too damaged and over-painted for any certainty to be possible.

== Other paintings ==
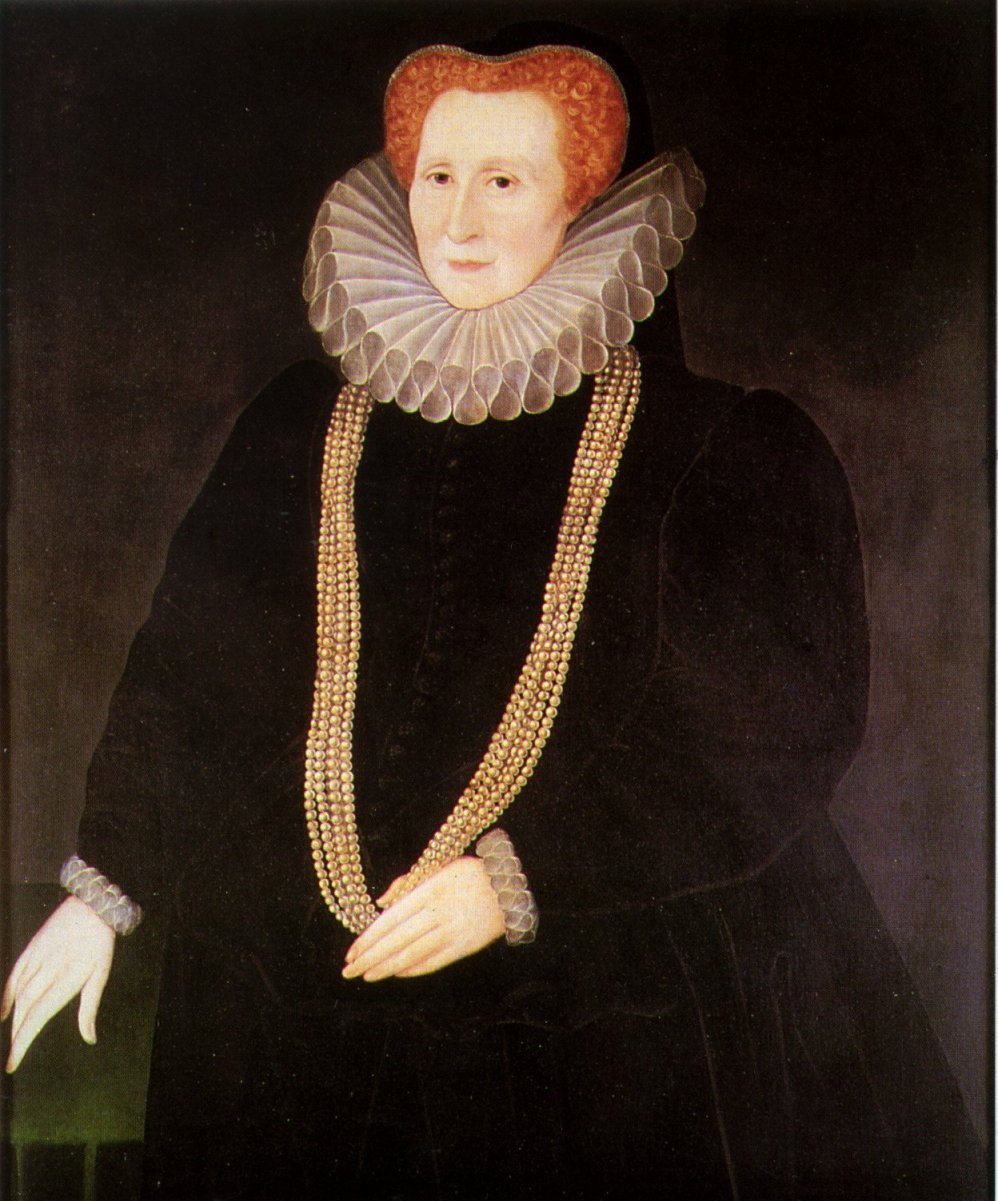
Bess of Hardwick, 1592

His signed portrait of Lady Margaret Beaufort, mother of Henry VII, based on a work by Meynnart Wewyck (Maynard Vewicke) was presented to St John's College, Cambridge in 1598.

Lockey was long associated with the Cavendish family of Hardwick Hall, working under the patronage of Bess of Hardwick between 1591 and 1597 and of her son Sir William Cavendish between 1608 and 1613. He produced around forty life-size pictures including copies of portraits of Cavendish's Elizabethan ancestors. Records detail the making of pictures. Lockey also gilded frames. Subjects named in the accounts include pictures of Mary, Queen of Scots, Sir William Maynard, and his wife Frances. The surviving Hardwick pictures include portraits of Bess herself and of King James I of England as a young boy, based on a 1574 painting by Arnold Bronckorst. The National Portrait Gallery, London, has a version of this picture by a different artist.

A "Sheffield portrait" style picture of Mary, Queen of Scots, at Hardwick is sometimes attributed to Lockey. A portrait of Mary, Queen of Scots, from Hardwick may have been used to model the tomb effigy of Mary, Queen of Scots, at Westminster Abbey. In 1610, a servant of Rowland Lockey was paid for travelling to London with two porters carrying Mary's portrait. The picture was returned to Hardwick in 1613.

The art historian Sir Roy Strong has identified a number of inferior copies of Hilliard's portrait miniatures as probably the work of Lockey, pointing out their "weak and laboured brushstrokes" and "smudgy" features. Strong concludes that while Lockey was of "no significance as an artist" when compared to his brilliant fellow-apprentice to Hilliard Isaac Oliver, his importance lies in carrying Hilliard's aesthetic into the next generation.

== Artistic background ==
Lockey can be associated with Dutch or Flemish painters residing in London in the 1580s. One such painter, Peter Matheeusen in his 1588 will made bequests to his cousin Adrian Vanson, to the miniaturist Isaac Oliver and to Rowland Lockey, including his library of manuals for painters.

== See also ==
- Artists of the Tudor court
- List of British artists
