= Thomas More (died 1606) =

English politician

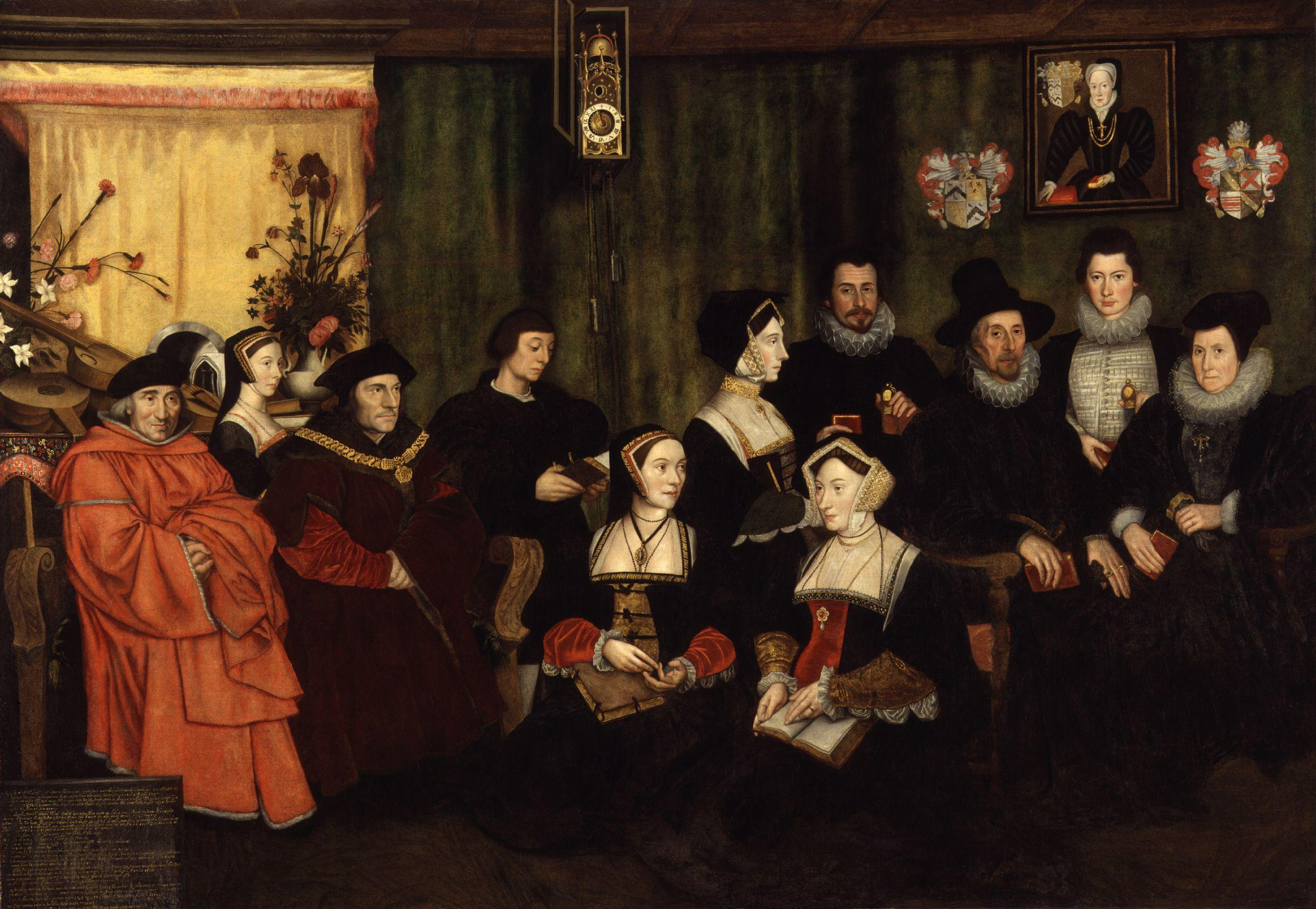
- Born: 1531
- Died: 19 August 1606 (aged 74–75)
- Children: Cresacre; John; Grace
- Parent: John More II
- Relatives: Sir Thomas More (grandfather); John More (great-grandfather)

Thomas More (1531–1606), of Hambleden, Buckinghamshire; Barnbrough, Yorkshire; Leyton, Essex and North Mimms, Hertfordshire, was an English politician.

He was a member (MP) of the parliament of England for Ripon in November 1554, during the reign of Mary I of England.

== Family ==
More was the son of John More II (1510–1547), the only son of Sir Thomas More and his first wife Jane Colt (c.1488-1511). His paternal great-grandfather was lawyer and judge John More.
