= Portrait of Sir Thomas More =

Painting by Hans Holbein the Younger

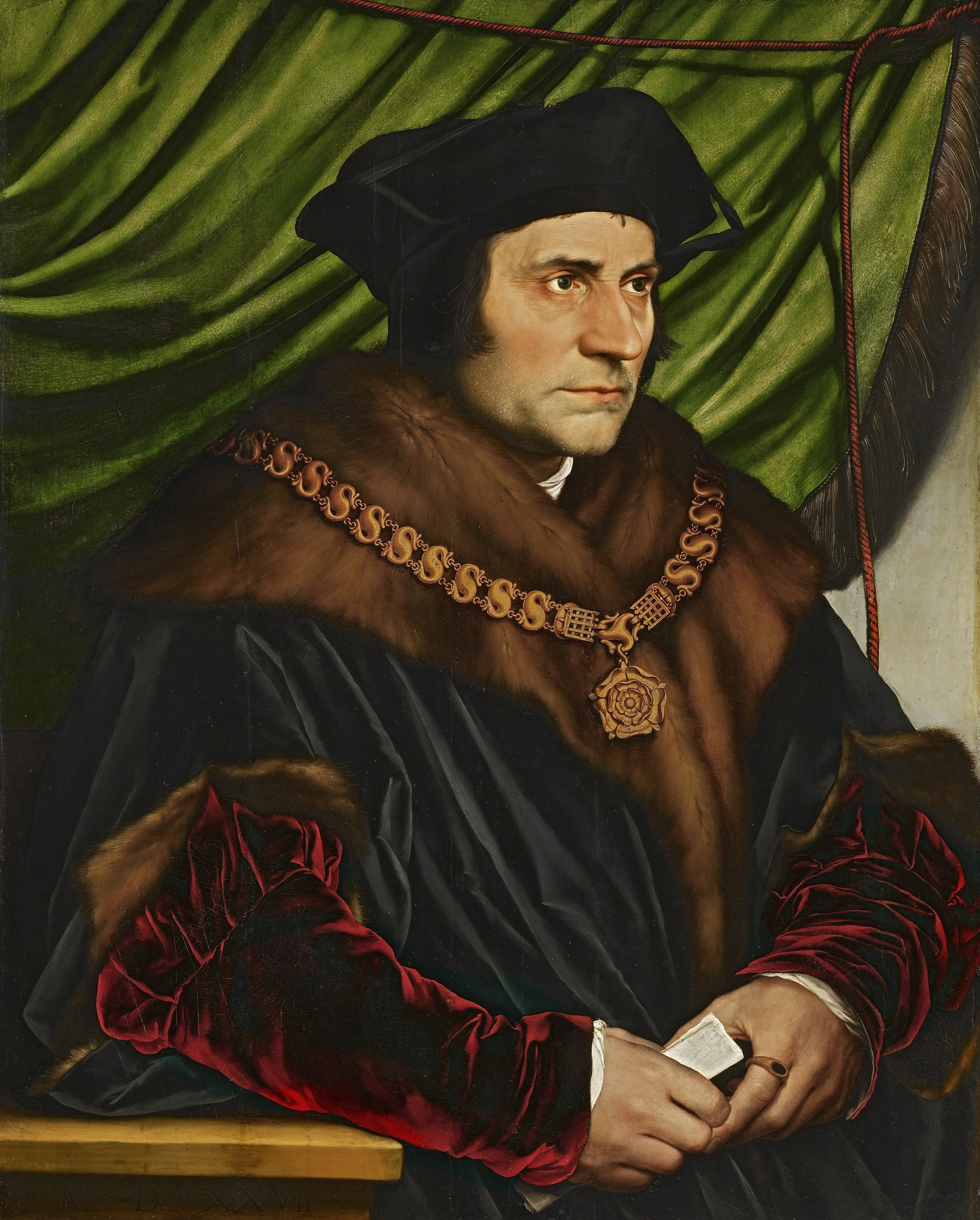
- Artist: Hans Holbein the Younger
- Year: 1527
- Type: Oil on oak
- Dimensions: 74.2 cm × 59 cm (29.2 in × 23 in)
- Location: Frick Collection; New York

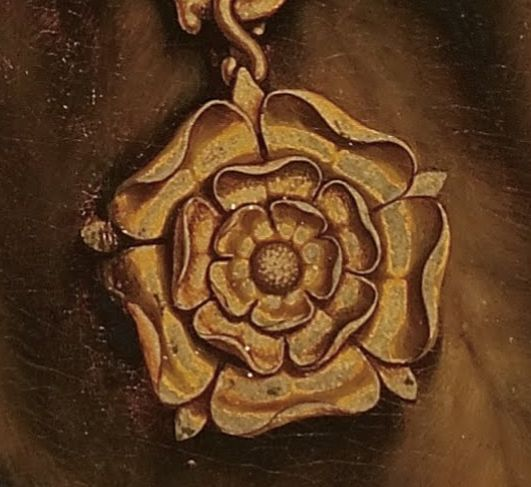
Detail of Tudor rose on the Collar of Esses livery chain

Portrait of Sir Thomas More is an oak panel painting created in 1527 by the German artist and printmaker Hans Holbein the Younger, now in the Frick Collection in New York.

The portrait shows the English statesman and humanist Thomas More in three-quarter right half-profile, holding a book, in a fur-lined coat of rich fabrics, black satin, and red velvet. He wears his Tudor Collar of Esses livery chain with Tudor rose, a sign of fealty and high office. A cord in the upper right is tied in a loose Franciscan knot, a sign of More's spiritual convictions. He is wearing a wedding ring inset with a stone on his left index finger.

The work was created during the period from 1526 when Holbein lived in London. He gained the friendship of the Dutch humanist Desiderius Erasmus, who recommended that he befriend More, then a powerful, knighted speaker at the English Parliament.

A closely related, though probably not directly preparatory, drawing with bodycolour is in the Royal Collection, and there is a copy in the National Portrait Gallery, probably "painted in Italy or Austria in the early seventeenth century". Possibly this is the version catalogued in the Leuchtenberg Gallery in 1852.

Another Holbein portrait of More, part of a large group portrait of his family, is now lost, but several drawings (also mostly in the Royal Collection) and copies survive.

== See also ==
- List of paintings by Hans Holbein the Younger

== Notes ==
External videos
- Hans Holbein, the Younger, Sir Thomas More, Frick Collection

== Sources ==
- Bätschmann, Oskar & Griener, Pascal. Hans Holbein. Reaktion Books, 1999. ISBN 1-86189-040-0
- Frick Collection, The Frick Collection: an Illustrated Catalogue, vol. 1 (Paintings), Princeton University Press, Princeton, NJ, 1968, 228–233.
