= John More (judge) =

English lawyer

Sir John More
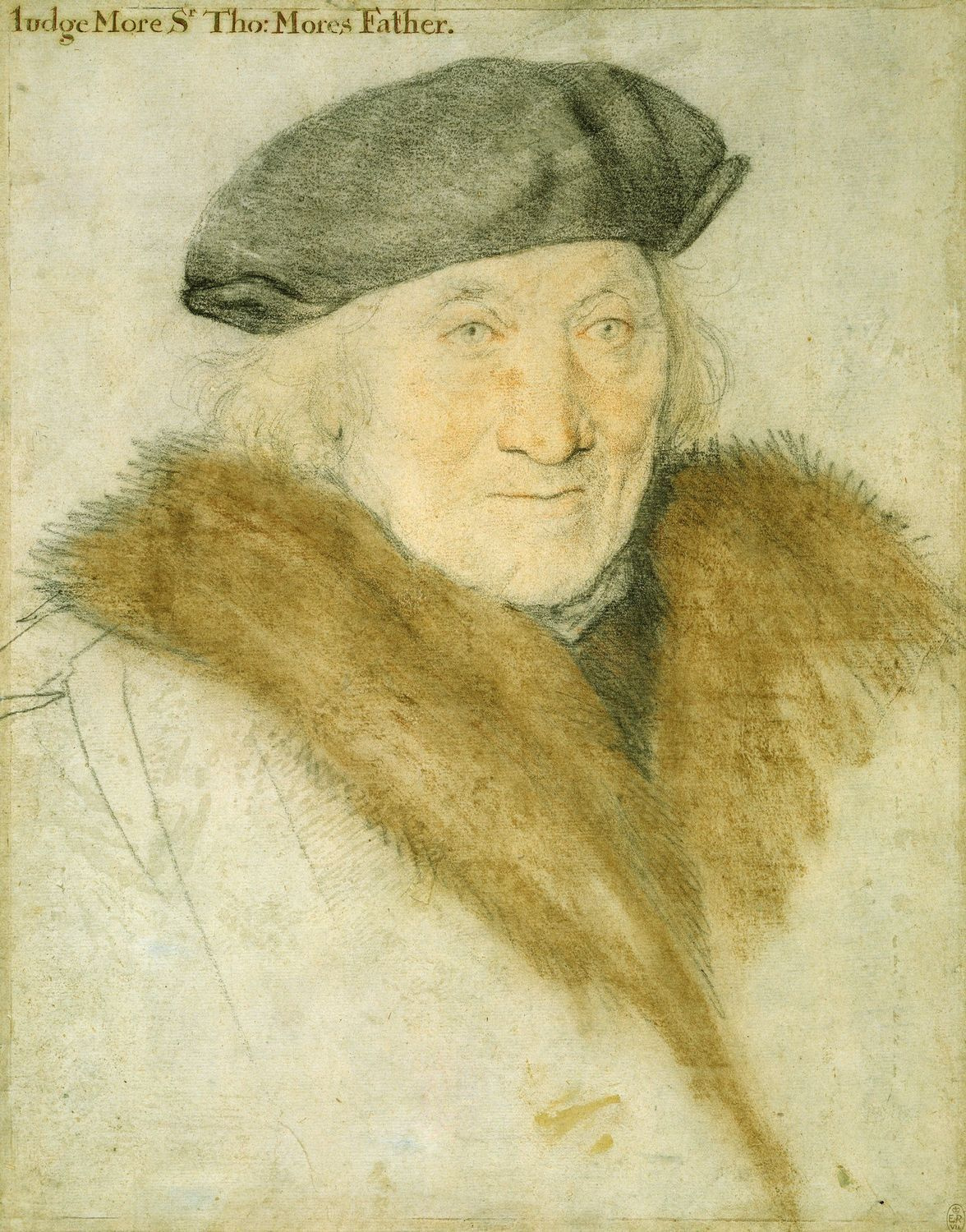
- Sir John More, aged 76, from "Study for a portrait of Thomas More's family", c. 1527, by Hans Holbein the Younger
- Born: c. 1451
- Died: November 1530
- Spouses: Agnes Graunger; Joan Marshall; Joan Bowes; Alice More
- Children: 6, including Sir Thomas More

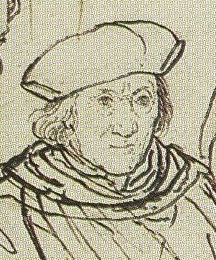
John More, detail from a Holbein's sketch for the More family portrait

Sir John More (c. 1451 – 1530) was an English lawyer and judge. He was the father of Sir Thomas More, Henry VIII's Lord Chancellor.

== Family ==
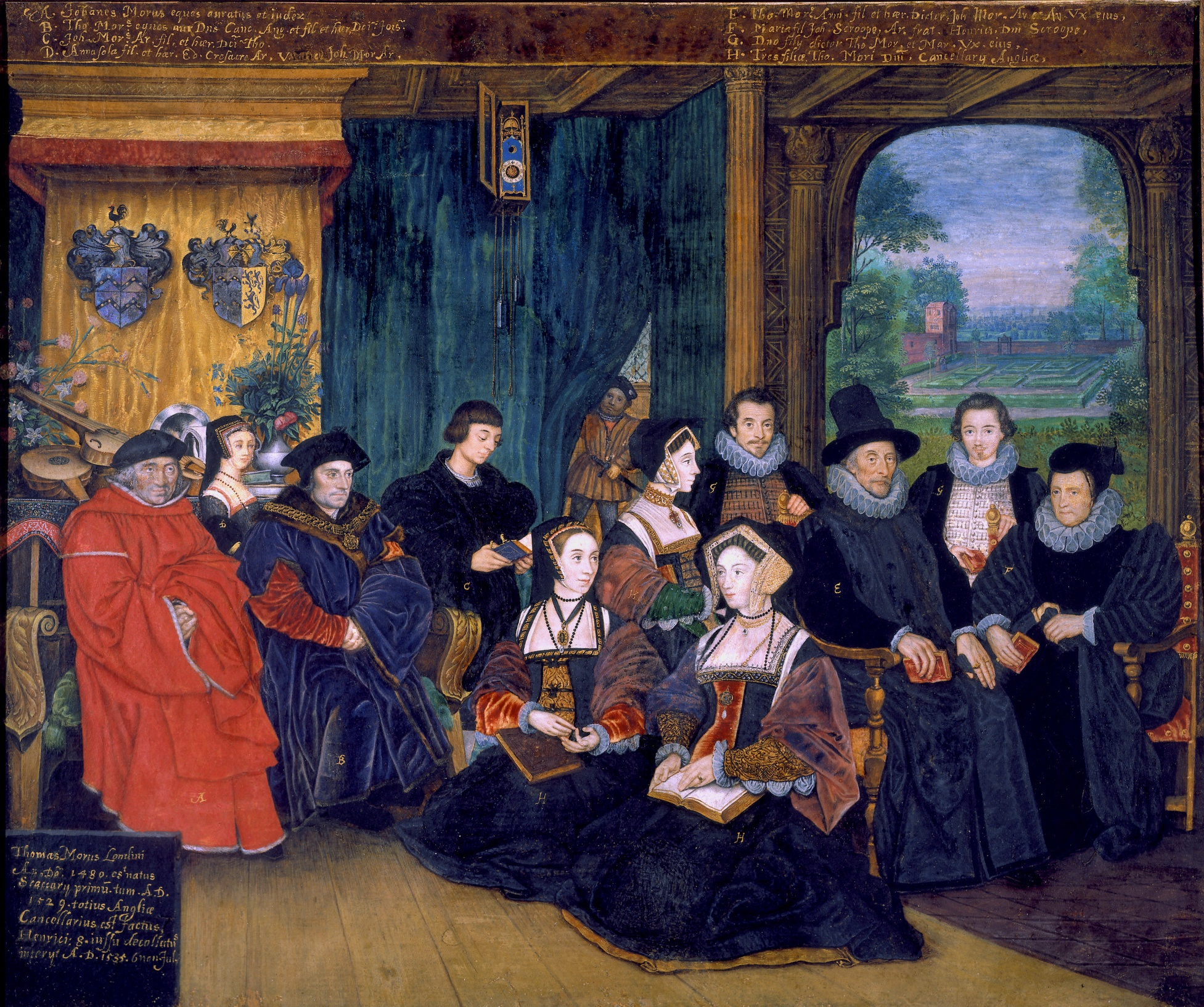
More with his son Thomas and family

More was the son of William More (d. 1467), a London baker, and Joanna Joye, daughter and heir of a London brewer, John Joye, and granddaughter and heir of a London Chancery clerk, John Leycester.

== Career ==
More entered Lincoln's Inn in either 1470 or 1475, was called to be a Serjeant-at-law in 1503, a Justice of Assize in 1513, a Justice of the Common Pleas in 1518, and finally to the King's Bench in 1520, where he remained until his death.

More inherited the manor of Gobions in North Mymms, Hertfordshire, and tenements in London, and also purchased more land in Hertfordshire. He was granted a coat of arms during Edward IV's reign. He also helped to fund his son-in-law John Rastell's attempt to reach and settle the New World in 1517, which got only as far as Waterford before the sailors abandoned Rastell and sold his cargo.

More made his will on 26 February 1527, naming his son, Sir Thomas More, as one of his executors and asking for his remains to be buried in the City of London church of St Lawrence Jewry. The will, proved on 5 November 1530, included provision for prayers for the souls of family members and for the soul of King Edward IV.

== Marriages and issue ==
On 24 April 1474, at St Giles-without-Cripplegate, More married Agnes Graunger (d.1499), the daughter of Thomas Graunger, a London tallow-chandler and alderman, by whom he had three sons and three daughters:

- Joanna More, born 11 March 1475, who married Richard Staverton, a lawyer of Lincoln's Inn.
- Sir Thomas More (6/7 February 1478 - 6 July 1535).
- Agatha More, born 1479, died young.
- John More, born 6 June 1480, died young.
- Edward More, born 1481, died young.
- Elizabeth More, born 22 September 1482, who married the printer, John Rastell (1475-1536).

After his first wife's death in about 1499, More married secondly, Joan (d. 1505), the widow of John Marshall, mercer; thirdly Joan (d. 1520), the widow of another London mercer, Thomas Bowes; and fourthly Alice More, the sister of Sir Christopher More of Loseley, Surrey, and widow of William Huntingdon of Exeter and of John Clerke. Alice survived him and died at North Mymms in 1545.
