= Clarence H. Miller =

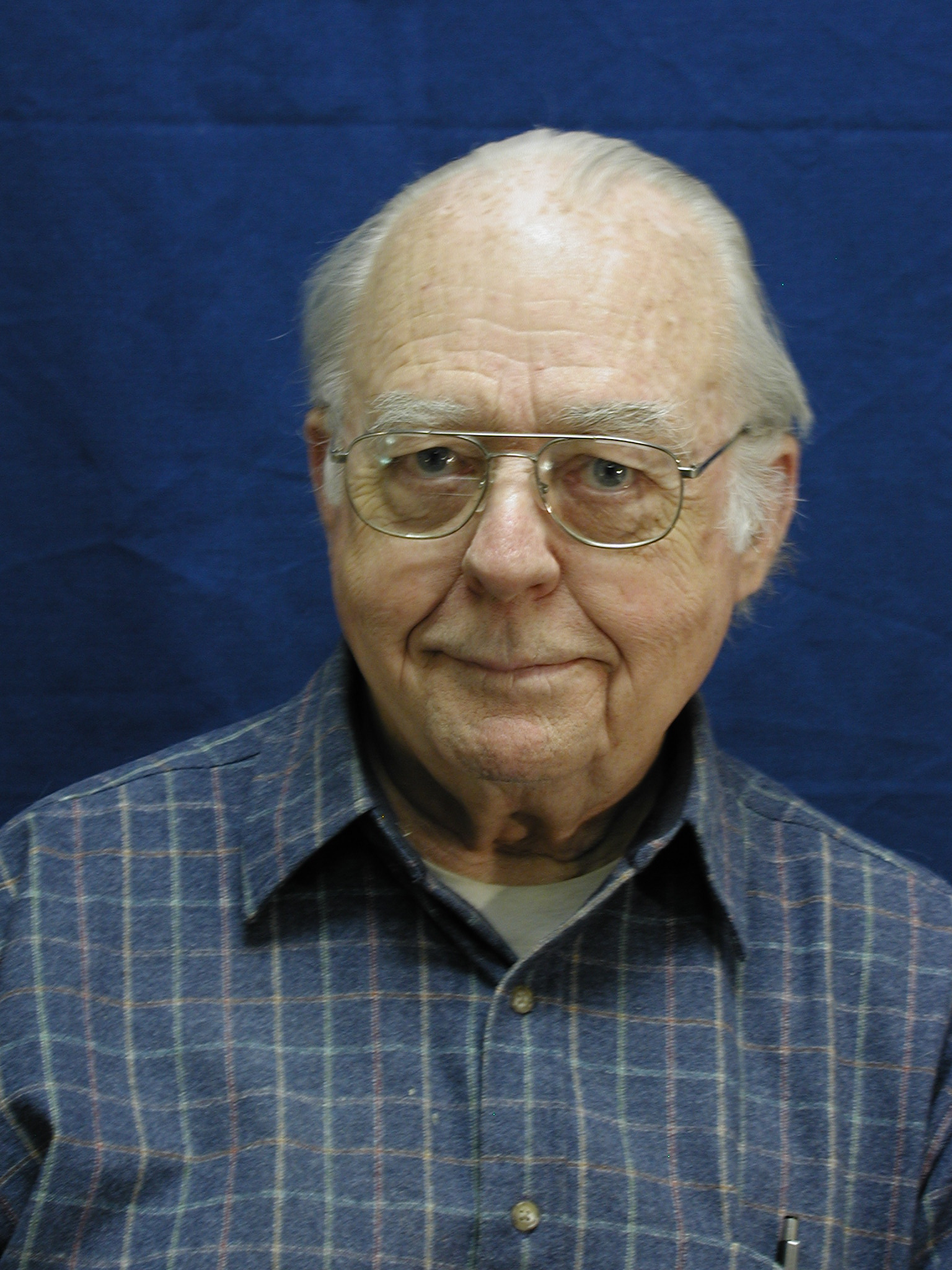
Clarence Miller, 2007

Clarence H. Miller (August 4, 1930 – June 21, 2019), born in Kansas City, Missouri, was an American professor emeritus of English at Saint Louis University. He is best known for major contributions to the study of Renaissance literature, and creating the classic translations from Latin of Saint Thomas More's 1516 book Utopia, and Erasmus's 1509 The Praise of Folly. Utopia is considered one of the most important works of European humanism. Miller was also Executive Editor of the Yale University Thomas More variorum project, which produced, over a period of decades, the 15-volume Yale Edition of the Complete Works of St. Thomas More.

== Biography ==
Miller was born in Kansas City, Missouri, and attended Rockhurst, the Jesuit high school there. He received his bachelor's degree from Saint Louis University in 1951, and his PhD from Harvard University in 1955. He taught at Saint Louis University, first as an Instructor of English (1957–1960), and eventually as the Dorothy McBride Orthwein Professor of English Literature (1966, until his retirement in 2000). He was a Fulbright Professor at the University of Würzburg in 1960–1961, and he received a Guggenheim Fellowship in 1966. From 1976–1977 he was Visiting Professor at the Ruhr University (Bochum, West Germany), and from 1979-1984 Visiting Professor at Yale University, where he also served as Executive Editor of the Yale Edition of the Complete Works of St. Thomas More (his tenure as editor extending beyond his tenure as Visiting Professor, to 1998).

== Works ==
=== Translations ===
- Erasmus and Luther: The Battle Over Free Will (Translated by Clarence H. Miller and Peter Macardle) Hackett Publishing Co.(Indianapolis/Cambridge, 2012)
- Thomas More's Utopia: A New Translation with Introduction and Notes (New Haven and London: Yale University Press, 2001)
- Translator of The Second part of Erasmus' Hyperaspistes Diatribae de Libero Arbitrio, and primary author of the commentary, Collected Works of Erasmus in English, vol. 77 (Toronto: University of Toronto Press, 2000). Co-editor Charles Trinkaus
- Translator of The First Part of Erasmus' Hyperaspistes Diatribae de Libero Arbitrio, and primary author of the commentary, Collected Works of Erasmus in English, vol. 76 (Toronto: University of Toronto Press, 1999). Co-editor Charles Trinkaus
- An edition of Thomas More's Utopia, Latin text and English translation (Cambridge University Press, 1995). Collaborators: Robert Adams and George Logan
- Erasmus, Poems, trans. Clarence H. Miller, edited and annotated Harry Vredeveld Collected Works of Erasmus, vols. 85 and 86 (Toronto, Buffalo, London: University of Toronto Press, 1993)
- A new translation, with introduction and commentary, of Erasmus' Praise of Folly and his Letter to Dorp (New Haven and London: Yale University Press, 1979)
- Italian translation of Al Montesi poem "Fellini's Peacock," River King Poetry Supplement 3/3 (Autumn/Winter 1997), 7

=== Editor ===
- Co-editor of Thomas More's English Poems, Life of Pico, and The Last Things, vol. 1 of The Complete Works of St. Thomas More (New Haven and London: Yale University Press, 1997). Co-editors Anthony S. G. Edwards and Katherine Gardiner Rodgers
- Co-editor with Elizabeth McCutcheon of Utopia Revisited, a collection of articles on Utopia in Moreana Nos. 118–19, vol. 31
- Co-editor of St. Thomas More's Letter to Bugenhagen, Supplication of Souls, and Letter against Frith. The Complete Works of St. Thomas More, vol. 7 (New Haven and London: Yale University Press, 1990). Co-editors: Frank Manly, Germain Marc'hadour, and Richard Marius
- Co-editor of St. Thomas More's The Debellation of Salem and Bizance. The Complete Works of St. Thomas More, vol. 10 (New Haven and London: Yale University Press, 1988). Co-editors: John Guy and Ralph Keen
- Co-editor of St. Thomas More's Answer to the First Part of the Poisoned Book. The Complete Works of St. Thomas More, vol. 11, (New Haven and London: Yale University Press, 1985). Co-editor: Stephen Foley
- Co-editor of St. Thomas More's Latin Poems. The Complete Works of St. Thomas More, vol. 3, part 2 (New Haven and London: Yale University Press, 1984). The text, my commentary and my part of the introduction have been translated into Italian as Tutti gli Epigrammi di Thomas More, tr. Ligi Firpo, ed. Luciano Paglialunga (Cinisello Balsalmo-Milan; Edizioni San Paolo, 1994).
- Erasmus' Moriae encomium, id est Stultitiae laus, vol. 3 in group 4 of Opera omnia Desiderii Erasmi Roterodami sponsored by the International Academic Union and the Royal Dutch Academy of Arts and Sciences ( Amsterdam and Oxford: North Holland Publishing Company, 1979)
- An edition of St. Thomas More's De tristitia Christi. The Complete Works of St. Thomas More, vol. 14 (Yale University Press, New Haven and London, 1976). The English translation is reprinted in The Sadness of Christ and Final Prayers and Instructions, ed. with an introduction by Gerard Wegemer (Princeton, N.J.: Scepter Publishers, 1993)
- An edition of The Praise of Folie, translated by Sir Thomas Chaloner (1549). Early English Text Society, Original Series No. 257 (Oxford University Press, 1965)

=== Articles ===
- Sir Thomas Chaloner the elder (1521–65) Oxford Dictionary of National Biography: in Association with the British Academy: from the Earliest Times to the Year 2000, ed. H.C.G. Matthew and Brian Harrison, 60 vols. (Oxford, New York: Oxford University Press, 2004), X, 893–96.
- "A Formerly Unknown Italian Translation of the Paris Newsletter Concerning the Trial and Execution of St. Thomas More," ANQ: A Quarterly Journal of Short Articles, Notes, and Reviews 17/3 (Summer 2004): 20–26
- "In Memoriam Louis L. Martz, Prince of the More Project, 1913–2001," Moreana, 38 (December 2001): 185–96. This memorial piece contains a complete bibliography of the writing of Louis Martz.
- "A Borrowing by Luther from Erasmus' Praise of Folly in 1518," Notes and Queries (Oxford University) NS 47/1 (2000): 22–23
- "The Daylily and the Dioscuri in Ben Jonson's Cary-Morison Ode," English Language Notes (University of Colorado at Boulder) 37/4 (June 2000): 21–9
- "Seventeenth-century Latin Translations of Two English Masterpieces: Hooker's Polity and Browne's Religio medici," Acta Conventus Neo-Latini Abulensis: Proceedings of the Tenth International Congress of Neo-Latin Studies, ed. Rhoda Schnur et al. (Tempe, AZ: Arizona Center for Medieval and Renaissance Studies, 2000), pp. 55–72
- "Christ as the Philosopher's Stone in George Herbert's `The Elixir,'" Notes and Queries (Oxford University), N. S. 45/1 (March 1998), 39–40
- "G. M. Hopkins' `Spring' as a May-Day Poem," Hopkins Quarterly, vol. 21, No. 1/2, (1994, published 1996), 23–27
- "The Devil's Bow and Arrows: Another Clue to the Identity of the Yeoman in Chaucer's Friar's Tale," The Chaucer Review, 30 (1995), 211–14
- "The May-day Celebration in Wordsworth's 'Immortality Ode.'" Studies in English Literature 27 (1987): 571–79
- "Some Medieval Elements and Structural Unity in Erasmus' Praise of Folly." Renaissance Quarterly 27 (1974): 499–511
- "Chaucer's Pardoner and the Mass." Chaucer Review 6 (1972): 171–84. Co-author: Roberta Bosse
- "A Vatican Manuscript Containing Three Brief Works by St. Thomas More." Moreana, No. 26 (1970): 41–44
- "The Holograph of Thomas More's Expositio Passionis: A Brief History." Moreana, Nos. 15 and 16 (1967): 372–79
- "Donne's 'A nocturnall upon S. Lucies Day' and the Nocturns of Matins." Studies in English Literature 6 (1966): 77–86. Reprinted in Essential Articles for the Study of John Donne and his Poetry, ed. John Roberts (Hamden, CT: Archon Books, 1975), pp. 305–10
- "The English Translation in the Yale Utopia: Some Corrections." Moreana, No. 9 (1966): 57–64
- "The Order of Stanzas in Cowley's and Crashaw's 'On Hope.'" Studies in Philology 61 (1964): 64–73
- "The Styles of The Hind and the Panther." Journal of English and Germanic Philology 61 (1962): 511-27
