= Edward Surtz =

Edward L. Surtz, SJ (1909–1973) was a professor at Loyola University Chicago and, at the time of his death, rector of the Jesuit house at the university.

== Life ==
Surtz was born in Cleveland, Ohio, on July 5, 1909. After graduating B.A. from John Carrol University in 1931, Surtz joined the Society of Jesus and went on to study at Xavier University, graduating M.A. in 1934. "The Religious Aspect of the Poetry of Gerald Manley Hopkins" was his master thesis. He was ordained as a priest in 1942, and obtained a doctorate in English from Harvard University in 1948.

In 1954 he was awarded a Guggenheim Fellowship. A festschrift in his honour was published as the November 1971 issue of Moreana, edited by Germain Marc'hadour.

He died on January 18, 1973, as the result of a cycling accident in Fort Lauderdale.

== Books ==
- The Praise of Pleasure: Philosophy, Education and Communism in More's Utopia (Harvard University Press, 1957).
- The Praise of Wisdom: A Commentary on the Religious and Moral Problems and Backgrounds of St. Thomas More's Utopia (Loyola University Press, 1957).
- Yale Edition of the Complete Works of St. Thomas More, Volume 4: Utopia. Edited by Edward Surtz S.J. and J. H. Hexter. (Yale University Press, 1965).
- The Works and Days of John Fisher (Harvard University Press, 1967).

== Commemoration ==
A Surtz Prize is awarded at Loyola each year to "a graduating senior who has excelled as a student and scholar of English literature".
