= Clarence Miller =

Clarence Miller may refer to:

- Clarence Miller (activist) (1906–?), 20th-century American labor activist
- Clarence B. Miller (1872–1922), United States Representative from Minnesota
- Clarence E. Miller (1917–2011), United States Representative from Ohio
- Clarence H. Miller (1930–2019), Renaissance scholar at Saint Louis University
- Clarence Horatius Miller (1922–1992), American jazz and blues singer

== See also ==
- Clarrie Millar (1925–2017), Australian politician
