= Yale Edition of the Complete Works of St. Thomas More =

Standard scholarly edition of the works of Thomas More

The Yale Edition of the Complete Works of St. Thomas More is the standard scholarly edition of the works of Thomas More, published by Yale University Press. The first of the fifteen volumes to be published (volume 2) appeared in 1963, and the last (volume 1) in 1997. The English works are provided with glossaries, and the Latin works with facing English translations.

== Volumes ==
The full list of volumes to date is:

- Volume 1: English Poems. Life of Pico. The Last Things. Edited by Anthony S. G. Edwards, Katherine Gardiner Rodgers, and Clarence H. Miller. 1997. ISBN 9780300062311
- Volume 2: The History of King Richard III. Edited by Richard S. Sylvester. 1963. ISBN 9780300009842
- Volume 3, Part I: Translations of Lucian. Edited by Craig R. Thompson. 1974. ISBN 9780300014723
- Volume 3, Part II: Latin Poems. Edited by Clarence H. Miller, Leicester Bradner, and Charles A. Lynch. 1984. ISBN 9780300025910
- Volume 4: Utopia. Edited by Edward Surtz S.J. and J. H. Hexter. 1965. ISBN 9780300009828
- Volume 5: Responsio ad Lutherum. Edited by John Headley. 1969. ISBN 9780300011234
- Volume 6, Parts I & II: A Dialogue Concerning Heresies. Edited by Thomas M. C. Lawler, Germain Marc'hadour, and Richard C. Marius. 1981. ISBN 9780300022117
- Volume 7: Letter to Bugenhagen, Supplication of Souls, Letter against Frith. Edited by Frank Manley, Clarence H. Miller, and Richard C. Marius. 1990. ISBN 9780300038095
- Volume 8, Parts I-III: The Confutation of Tyndale's Answer. Edited by Louis A. Schuster, Richard C. Marius, and James P. Lusardi. 1973.
- Volume 9: The Apology. Edited by J. B. Trapp. 1979. ISBN 9780300020670
- Volume 10: The Debellation of Salem and Bizance. Edited by John Guy, Clarence H. Miller, and Ralph Keen. 1988. ISBN 9780300033762
- Volume 11: The Answer to a Poisoned Book. Edited by Clarence H. Miller and Stephen M. Foley. 1985. ISBN 9780300031294
- Volume 12: A Dialogue of Comfort against Tribulation. Edited by Louis L. Martz and Frank Manley. 1976.
- Volume 13: Treatise on the Passion, Treatise on the Blessed Body, Instructions and Prayers. Edited by Garry E. Haupt. 1976. ISBN 9780300017946
- Volume 14: De Tristitia Christi. Edited by Clarence H. Miller. 1976. ISBN 9780300017939
- Volume 15: In Defense of Humanism: Letters to Dorp, Oxford, Lee, and a Monk. Edited by Daniel Kinney. 1986. ISBN 9780300031614
