= A Dialogue of Comfort against Tribulation =

1534 book by Thomas More

- Author: Thomas More
- Original title: A dialoge of comfort against tribulation
- Language: English
- Genre: Dialogue
- Set in: Hungary
- Publisher: Richard Tottel
- Publication date: 1553

A Dialogue of Comfort against Tribulation is a work that was written by St. Thomas More while imprisoned in the Tower of London in 1534.

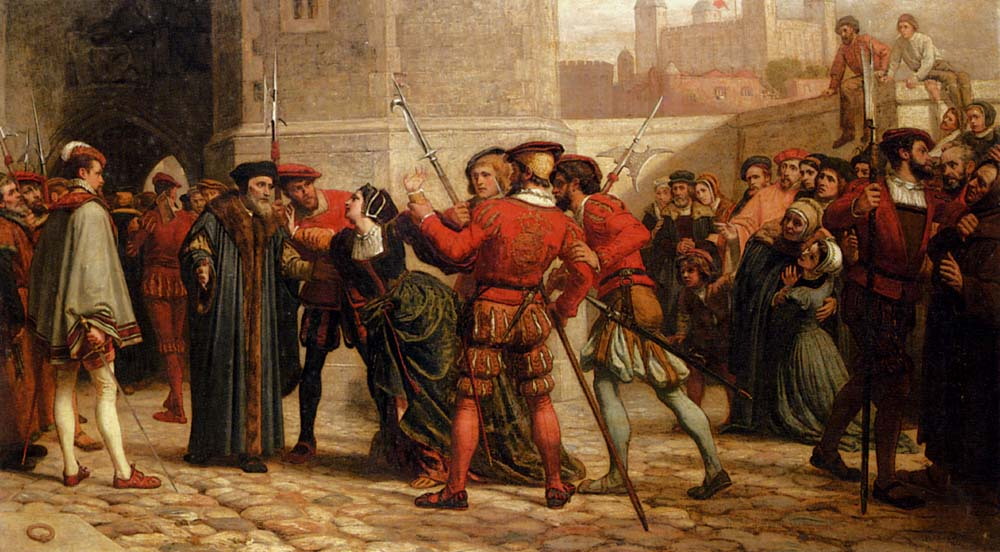
William Frederick Yeames, The meeting of Sir Thomas More with his daughter after his sentence of death, 1872

== Introduction ==
Thomas More was imprisoned by King Henry VIII for refusing to swear to the Act of Succession (1534). He had been given writing materials in the early months of his imprisonment.

The Dialogue is set in the Kingdom of Hungary in 1528, between the invasions of Suleiman the Magnificent. It is a fictional dialogue between Vincent and his uncle, Anthony. The book begins with Vincent paying a visit to his uncle. He is terrified by the invasions of the Ottomans and seeks comfort from Anthony. Anthony tells him that comfort can only come from God. The Dialogue is a reflection on worldly power, the transience of pleasure, and the redemptive power of Jesus Christ. While it is a spiritual reflection, the treatment of themes of worldly power by a major political figure and humanist also characterizes it as a work of political thought.

== Summary ==
=== Book I ===
(Day 1)

==== Comfort in Tribulation (Chapters I–XII) ====
Anthony defines tribulation as grief consisting either of bodily pain or heaviness of the mind. Ancient moral philosophers recommended various remedies for tribulation, but they lacked the most effective source of comfort, faith, which is a gift from God (I-II).

The first source of comfort in tribulation is the desire to be comforted by God (III). But, the desire to have tribulation taken away is not always sufficient, since God sometimes wills for us to suffer tribulation (IV). Anthony discusses the importance of friends who pray for and give counsel to the one suffering tribulation (V). Comfort in tribulation requires trust that God works all things towards good (VI).

The second source of comfort is that tribulation is medicinal (VII). Anthony says there are three types of tribulation:

1. those caused through our own fault (VIII)
2. those sent by God as punishment for past sins or to prevent other sins (IX)
3. those sent to increase our patience and our merit (X)

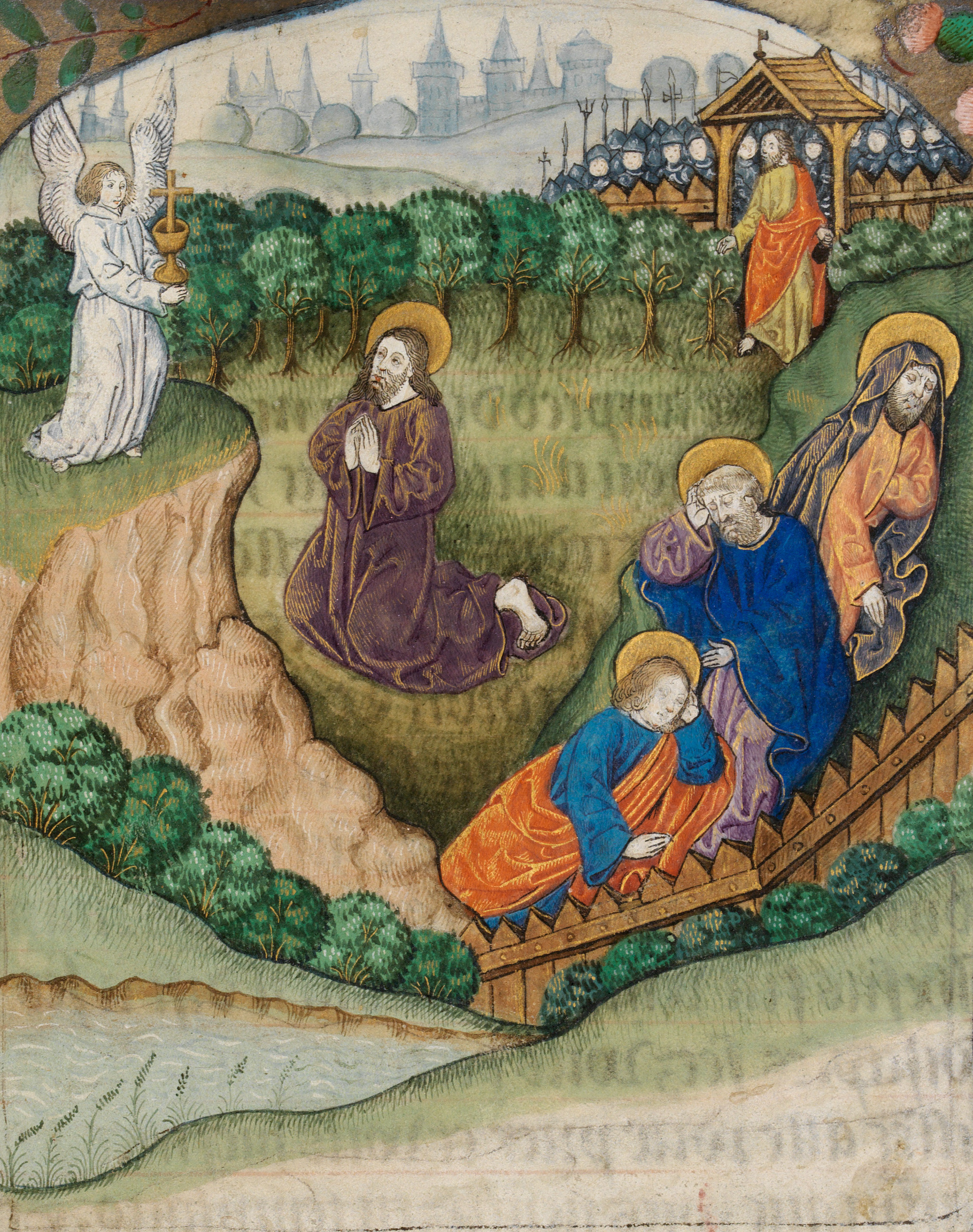
Christ praying in the garden of Gethsemane.

The third source of comfort is that merit can be gained through perseverance here on Earth but not in purgatory (XI). This perseverance leads not only to the purging of our sins, but also to the increase of our heavenly reward. Anthony questions the existence of purgatory (XII).

==== The Necessity of Tribulation (Chapters XIII–XX) ====
The fourth source of comfort is that the cross is necessary to enter heaven and continual prosperity is a grave danger (XIII). Vincent responds that this treatment of prosperity is too harsh (XIV) and raises four objections (XV):

1. the Church prays for the health of princes and prelates
2. if health and prosperity are wrong why take medicine
3. Solomon, Job, and Abraham were all prosperous
4. many rich men are good and many poor people are evil

Anthony defines tribulation again and answers first and third objections (XVI). Then, Anthony answers the second objection and explains how suffering draws us to God, through prayer (XVII). Anthony speaks of those who seek “mad medicines” rather than God (XVIII). Vincent questions the preeminence Anthony gives to suffering. Anthony argues that the prayers of those suffering are far more precious to God than the prayers of the prosperous (XIX). Anthony explains that suffering is a gracious gift from God. Anthony speaks about the necessity of tribulation. He claims that continual prosperity without tribulation is a sign of God's disfavor (XX).

=== Book II ===
(about a month later, after breakfast)

Vincent returns to visit Anthony and tells him that he has shared his council with his friends and that he wishes to hear more. The main topic of their last discussion was not tribulation itself but the comfort that comes from it (prologue). Vincent says that Anthony's disavowal of all worldly recreation is too hard. Anthony responds that while it is allowed to seek worldly enjoyment our first priority should be to seek comfort from God (I). Anthony bemoans how old and frail he is (II). Anthony divides tribulation into three types:

1. those which a man willingly takes upon himself
2. those he willingly suffers
3. those he cannot avoid, such as sickness, imprisonment, loss of goods, loss of friends or unavoidable bodily harm.

The third kind was discussed in the first book and Anthony reiterates his principle that wit and faith are necessary for comfort in this type of tribulation (III). Anthony describes the first type where the tribulation is willfully accepted for penance and no comfort is needed. To show that two contrary states can co-exist, he gives an example of a strange intermittent fever he had where he felt both cold and hot (IV). Vincent says many people refrain from repenting until their deathbeds. Anthony answers saying deathbed conversions are still salvific but those who live lives of repentance have a higher place in heaven (V). Vincent adds that some say compunction and penance for one's sins is unnecessary or ineffectual and that only the intent to do better is required. Anthony responds, the Church has always taught that it is only through Christ's Passion that our penance is worth anything. And Anthony gives many scriptural examples of how fasting was instituted by God, not by men and for more reasons than to increase physical temperance (VI). Vincent asks, what if one cannot feel sorry for one's sins. Anthony answers that if he cannot feel sorry for his sin, then at least he should feel sorry for not feeling sorry (VII).

Anthony discusses the second type of tribulation, those willingly suffered, and he subdivides them into two parts: the first being temptation and the second persecution (VIII).

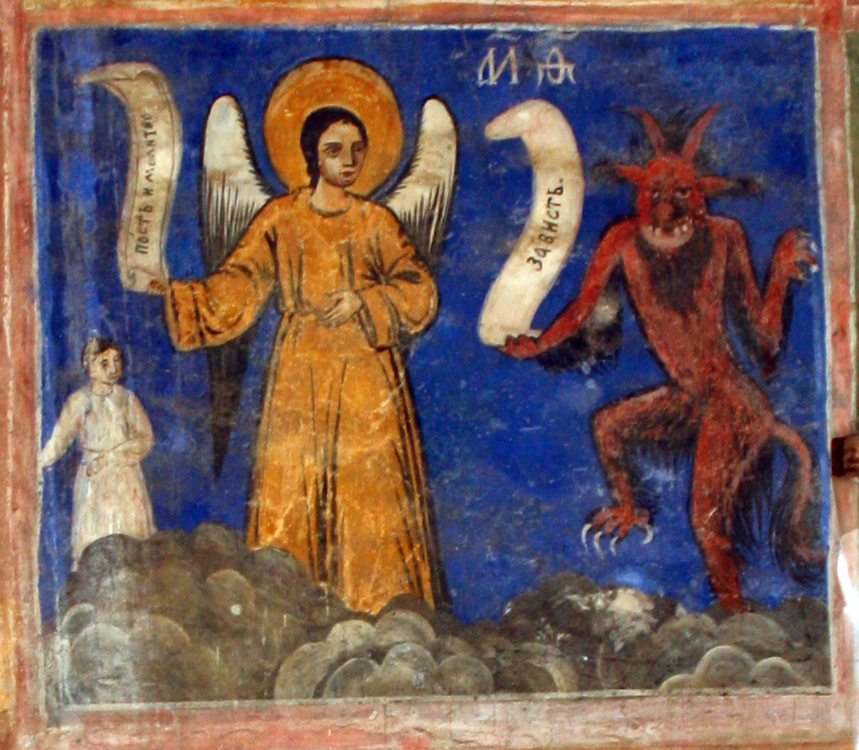
Envy-fasting-prayer

==== Psalm 91 [90]:5-6 and the First Temptation (Chapters IX–XVI) ====
Continuing the discussion on temptation, Anthony says that the forms of temptation are diverse and the more we are tempted the more reason we have to be comforted in the hope of receiving an eternal reward (IX). The second comfort in temptation is that God has promised to give us the necessary strength and wisdom to overcome temptation if we ask for it. He introduces Psalm 91 [90] where God is described as a hen which protects her young with her wings (X).

Anthony distinguishes four types of temptation in the Psalm (XI). The first is about fear which leads to impatience or to the exaggeration of danger. Anthony uses verse five from the Psalm ‘Thou shalt not be afeard of the fear of the night’ as a basis for his interpretation (XII). Another form of ‘night’s fear’ is pusillanimity, which is fleeing from things that are incorrectly perceived as dangerous (XIII). Anthony describes a scrupulous conscience as the “daughter of pusillanimity” and advises those with scruples to seek another's counsel (XIV). Anthony continues by saying the desire to commit suicide is another example of ‘night’s fear’. Vincent objects and says that suicide is an example of courage and boldness. Anthony responds by telling him that people can be tempted to commit suicide out of pride or anger and therefore do not suffer tribulation and are not in need of comfort but rather good counsel (XV). Anthony discusses the desire to kill oneself that is perceived to be a revelation from God. In such cases comfort and counsel are both required; counsel is necessary to make him aware of his delusion and comfort is necessary to encourage him and give him consolation (XVI).

==== The Second Temptation (Chapter XVI) ====
Anthony defines the second temptation as pride. He interprets "the arrow flying by day" (Psalm 91 [90]:5b) to consist of temptations that find their source in prosperity (XVI).

==== The Third Temptation (Chapter XVII) ====
Anthony identifies the third temptation as covetousness. He interprets Psalm 91 [90]:6 “the busyness walking about in the darknesses” to be the frantic pursuit of riches or worldly possessions. Vincent asks if the rich man can be saved. Anthony explains that riches in themselves are not evil only the inordinate pursuit of them. Wealth should be used to care for the poor, one's family (including servants), and strangers in need (XVII).

=== Book III ===
(later on the same day, after dinner)

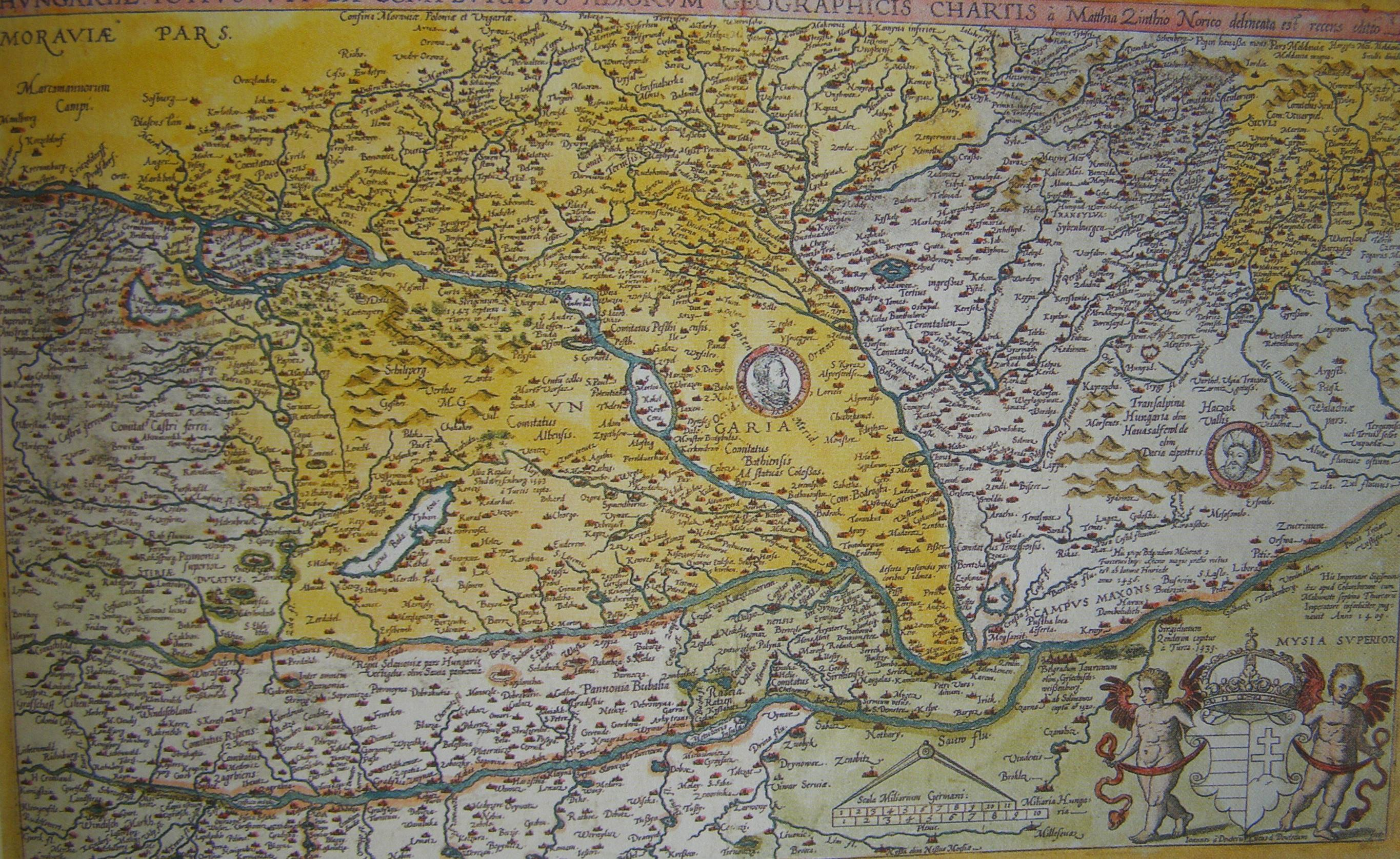
The Kingdom of Hungary was torn into three parts (1567)

Vincent tells Anthony about a letter he saw from Constantinople concerning the approaching Turkish army. Vincent expresses his fear that the Turks will invade Hungary and that many Christians will renounce their faith. Anthony agrees that this will probably happen. He says that Turkish invasion is God's punishment on Europe for their lack of faith. Anthony says that since the various warring factions for the Hungarian throne will not offer much resistance against the Turkish invasion, they should prepare for the worst (Prologue).

Vincent objects saying it is dangerous to think about how one would respond under torture, one would either promise too much beforehand and fail to persevere, or want to avoid pain and give up your faith. Anthony responds that Christians must confess their faith openly upon pain of damnation. If anyone is afraid of falling, let them think of Christ's Passion and pray for strength (I).

==== The Fourth Temptation (Chapters II–IV) ====
The fourth, and final temptation, is open persecution for the faith. Anthony interprets Psalm 91 [90]:6b "incursion of the noon-day devil" to be the most dangerous of all temptations. Here the Devil works openly and without subterfuge. Vincent would like to be prepared to withstand the attacks of the Devil with good counsel (II).

Anthony states that both the soul and the body can suffer harm. Anthony asks Vincent to list the outward things that a man might lose and the pain he might suffer. Vincent first lists the loss of worldly possessions, offices, positions of authority and finally the lands that belong to the man in question and his heirs. The loss of these things leads to neediness and poverty, and the shame of begging. The harm that comes to the body consists of loss of liberty, hard labor, imprisonment, and a painful and shameful death (III). Anthony admits that after examining the issue as they have, the threat of the Turkish invasion seems less terrible (IV).

==== The Loss of Outward Things (Chapters V–XVI) ====
Anthony states that the value of outward goods is greatly exaggerated; they can be lost easily (V). The possession of land does not offer any more security than other forms of wealth (VI). The outward ‘goods of fortune’ and one's reputation should be used to benefit one's earthly life and increase merit, “with God’s help”, in the afterlife (VII). There is a limited value of being wealthy in this life (VIII).

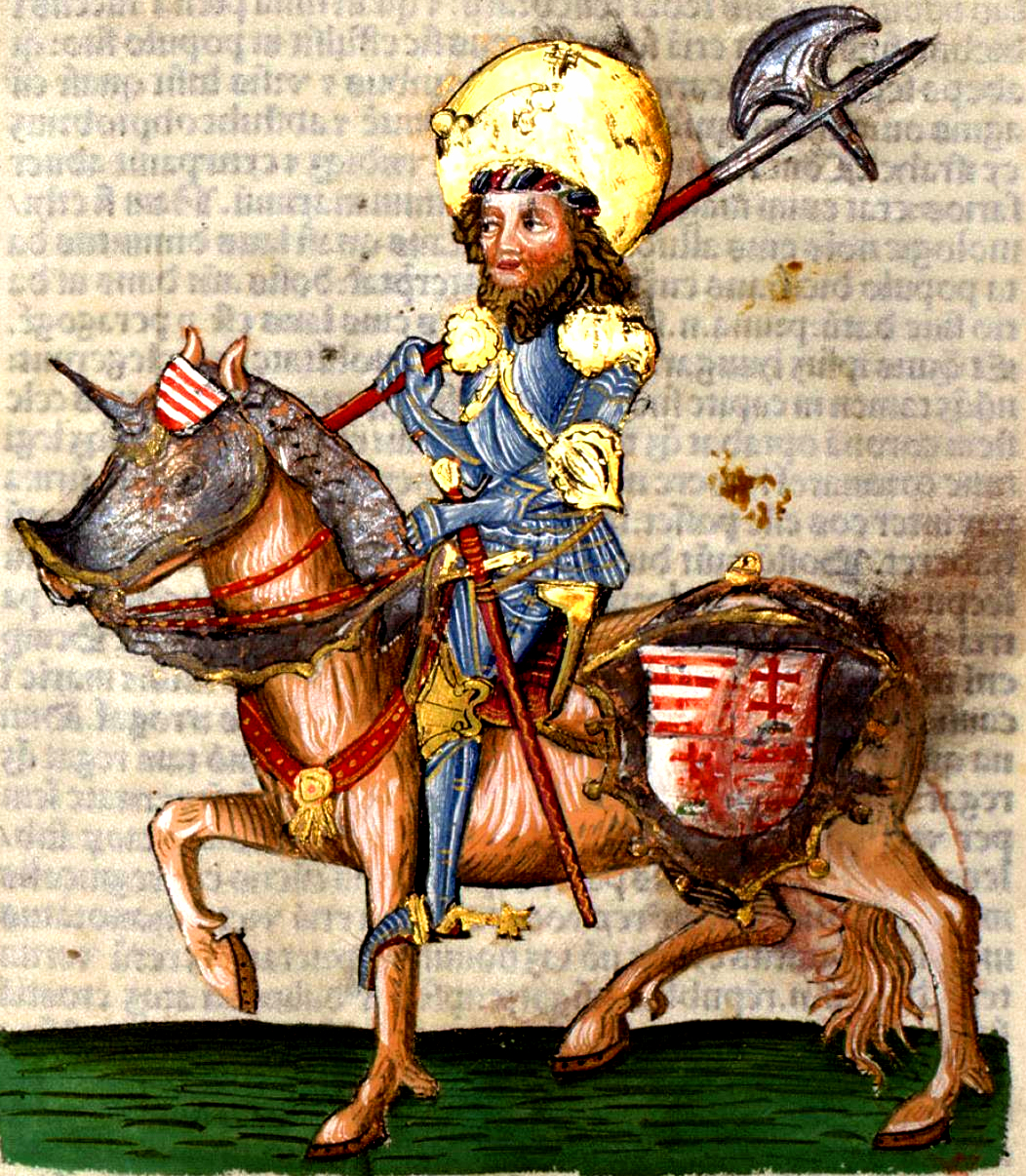
Ladislaus I (Chronica Hungarorum)

Anthony considers fame or one's good name. Its value is also exaggerated and can even be harmful, especially when people hate or envy us (IX). Some men prefer flattery over honesty so much they hire flatterers as advisors. Vincent tells a story about a prelate who asked an ambassador for advice and afterwards rebuked him for his honesty. Anthony responds with a story about King Ladislaus I of Hungary, who if he was honestly and deservedly praised, would let it pass unremarked, but if he received flattery he would tell the flatterer to not praise him with lies (X).

Anthony explains that positions of authority are of little value if they are only desired for worldly advantage. Most men only want positions of power so that they can order people around. Vincent interjects that there is still a certain pleasure in making people bow and do reverence. Anthony replies that even princes cannot always have their way and their responsibilities are more burdensome (XI). Outward goods, when desired only for worldly advantage, have little value for the body and can cause great harm for the soul (XII). Anthony points out that in the imminent Turkish persecutions those who have a greater desire to keep their possessions than faith will keep their worldly goods and those who have a stronger faith than the desire to keep their possessions will lose their worldly goods (XIII). Vincent acknowledges that the temptation to give up one's faith to keep one's worldly possessions is the strongest of all temptations. Anthony has Vincent play the role of a great lord who wants to keep his possessions. Vincent, as the lord, says he can outwardly confess the Great Turk's faith while secretly remaining a Christian. Anthony responds that God is not fooled and neither will the Great Turk. A person cannot serve both God and Mammon. He also points out that even if one denies the faith that is no guarantee one will be able to keep one's property (XIV).

Vincent points out that it is always detestable to lose one's possessions. Anthony suggests that the only safe place to hide one's treasure is in heaven, that is to give one's possessions to the poor. If our hearts are truly in Heaven, God will strengthen us to suffer the loss of our worldly possessions (XV). Christians have grown very weak and lukewarm in their faith. Yet, if they truly remembered the poverty of Christ, how he became poor and needy for their sake, they would be ashamed to forsake him by keeping their wealth. If we lose our possessions because of our faith we will be recompensed in heaven (XVI).

==== Bodily Pain, Captivity, and Imprisonment (Chapters XVII–XXII) ====
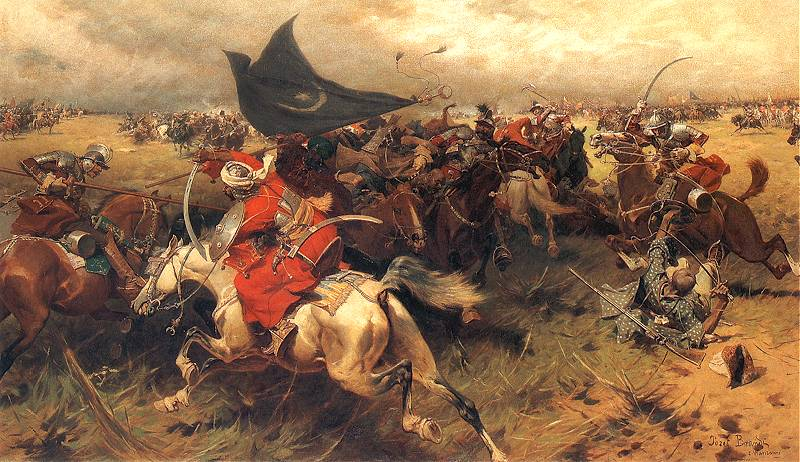
Sipahis of the Ottoman Empire by Józef Brandt

Vincent tells Anthony of his fear of denying the faith under torture. Anthony responds by reminding Vincent that Christ dreaded his own Passion. Vincent is comforted by Anthony's words (XVII). Anthony lists the physical punishments common in the persecution by the Turks: captivity, imprisonment, and painful death. Anthony defines captivity as the violent restraint of a man under the power of another to the extent that he must do what the other commands, and is not at liberty to go where he wishes. Christ's humility is offered as a model to follow (XVIII).

Anthony states that every man is in a prison. Vincent objects, accusing his uncle of “sophistical fantasies”. Anthony welcomes Vincent's challenge and replies that every man coming into this world is condemned to death by God's own judgement for man's original sin. No one, not even the greatest king, can escape the grisly cruel hangman Death (XIX).

Anthony describes God is the chief jailer of this prison of the whole earth. Vincent accepts part of Anthony's argument, but objects that he does not see God putting any man in stocks or fetters, or locking him in a chamber. Anthony replies that as God himself is invisible, he also uses invisible instruments to inflict his punishments. If we fear imprisonment at the hands of the Turks so much that we are prepared to renounce our faith, then we will find ourselves thrown into the prison of Hell, from which no man ever escapes (XX).

Vincent expresses fear of suffering a shameful and painful death. Anthony explains that if our affections are sensual we will fear death much more than if they are spiritual (XXI). Anthony considers death itself (XXII).

==== Persecution and Martyrdom (Chapters XXIII–XXVII) ====
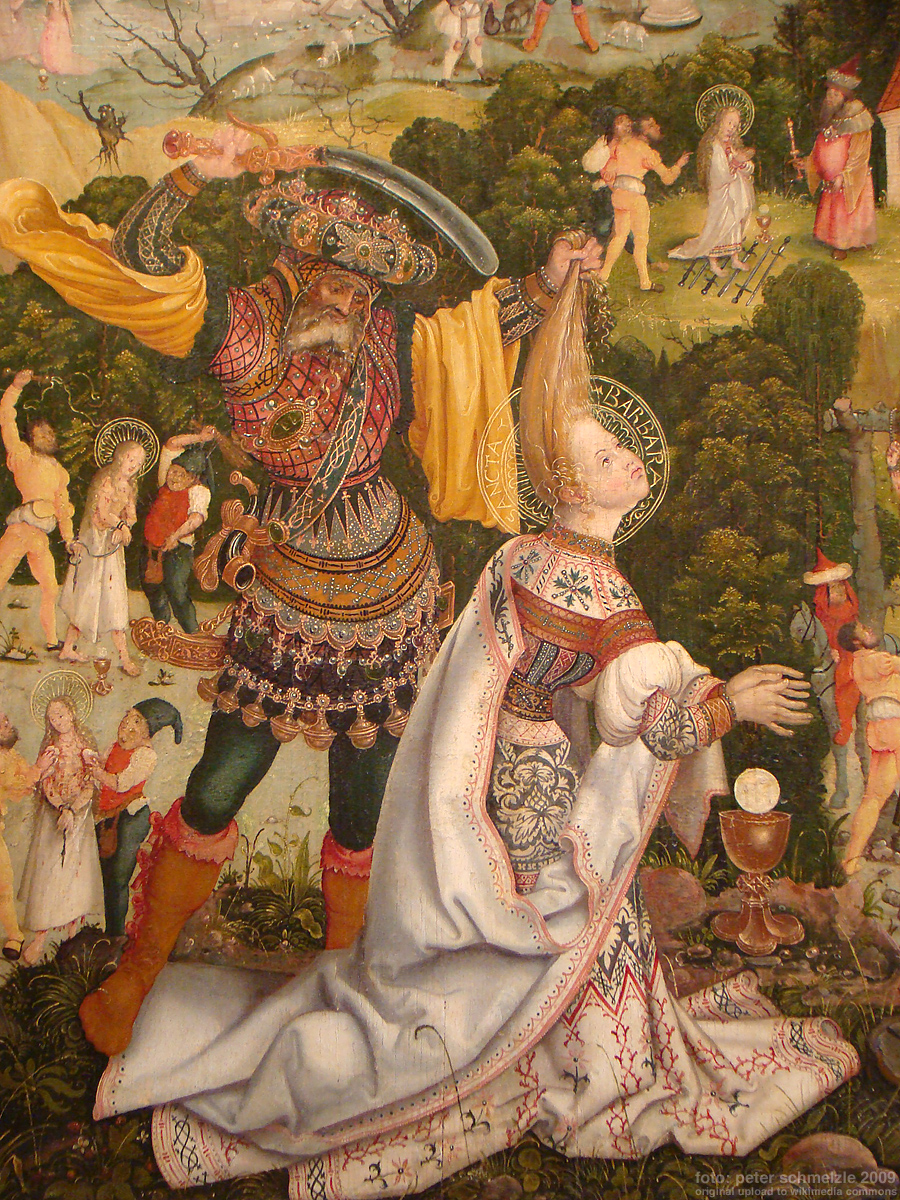
Martyrdom of St. Barbara

Anthony discusses the shame that comes with persecution. Anthony then argues that the faithful wise man will not dread any death however painful since Christ himself and his saints died such glorious deaths (XXIII). Vincent responds that shame is one thing that can be mastered, but no one can master pain in the same way. Anthony replies that, though no one can deny the reality of pain, reason alone often helps a man to bear the pain for the sake of some greater good (XXIV).

Anthony says that Christ warns us not to fear those who can only kill the body, but rather to fear the one who can kill both body and soul in Hell. Anyone who considers this will not be afraid to endure the most terrible sufferings the Turks can inflict, rather than be cast into the pains of Hell (XXV). Anthony discusses the joys of Heaven. He says, if we considered the joys of Heaven, we would be much more willing to suffer for Christ in this world for the sake of winning heavenly joy (XXVI).

Finally, Anthony describes in detail the sufferings of Christ in his Passion, and suggests that, if we meditate on them, they will inflame our cold hearts with such love for Christ, that we will be happy to suffer death for his sake. We should prepare ourselves with prayer, fasting and almsgiving, and not trust in our own strength, but rely on the help of God. We should resist the Devil's temptations, and not fear the Turks.(XXVII)

==== Conclusion ====
Anthony, wearily, bids Vincent farewell. Vincent thanks Anthony for all his efforts and the comfort Vincent has taken from Anthony's counsels. Vincent says he will write down what was discussed in Hungarian and German. Anthony ends by praying that God will breathe His Holy Spirit into the reader's breast, so that he may teach the reader inwardly in his heart. Anthony then prays that God will reunite them once more either here or in Heaven (XXVII).

== The Great Turk as forms of tribulation ==
There are three main interpretations of the Great Turk in the Dialogue.

=== The Ottoman Emperor ===
In a literal interpretation, the Great Turk signifies the terrible vulnerability of a theologically and politically divided Europe to the Turkish invasions. As Hungary was on the eastern edge of Europe, it was the first line of defense in preventing the Ottomans from conquering the rest Europe. And since the Emperor took an oath (Book III) when he becomes Sultan to spread the faith of Islam by conquest, the threat of persecution or martyrdom for Christians was real.

=== Henry VIII ===
Henry VIII was directly responsible for Thomas More’s tribulation when he wrote the Dialogue in the tower. But the King’s legacy can be extended to all Roman Catholics in England. The separation of England from the Roman Catholic Church during the English Reformation made Catholicism illegal and began centuries of persecution. Catholics were not granted legal toleration in England until 1829 under the Roman Catholic Relief Act 1829 and there is still a very deep rooted tradition of Anti-Catholicism today in English speaking countries including the USA.

=== The Devil ===
The Devil is ultimately the cause of all the trials and persecutions that Christians may be called upon to suffer in this life, especially in light of the first and second interpretations. In the Dialogue, Thomas More continually emphasizes the importance of a strong faith and prayer to overcome the Devil and his works.

== Publication ==
Immediately after More's death, the Dialogue of Comfort circulated in manuscript form. The most important surviving manuscripts are the Corpus Christi Manuscript, Bodleian Library, Ms. C.C.C. D.37; and British Library, Ms. Royal 17 D.XIV. It was first published, in quarto, in London by Richard Tottel in 1553. In modern editions, the spelling and punctuation of the original are corrected and standardized.

== Studies ==
- Leland Miles, "With a Coal? The Composition of Thomas More's Dialogue of Comfort", Philological Quarterly, 45:2 (1966): 437-442.
- Study guide
- Martz, Louis. "The Design of More's Dialogue of Comfort." (Nov. 1967)
- Miles, Leland. "Patristic Comforters in More's Dialogue of Comfort." (Nov. 1965)
- "Function of Psalm 90 in More's Dialogue." (May. 1969)
- Basset, Bernard. "A Dialogue of Comfort for Us All." (Mar. 1979)
- Sylvester, Richard S. "Three Dialogues." (March 1980)
- Khanna, Lee Cullen. "Truth and Fiction in A Dialogue of Comfort." (June 1980)
- Russell, J. Stephen. "More's Dialogue and the Dynamics of Comfort." (June 1980)
- Billingsley, Dale B. "'Imagination' in A Dialogue of Comfort." (June 1982)
- Billingsley, Dale B. "'Resources of Kind' in A Dialogue of Comfort." (June 1982)
- Yee, Nancy C. "Thomas More: In Defense of Tribulation." (June 1982)
- Clark, James Andrew. "More and Tyndale as Prose Stylists." (June 1984)
- Norland, Howard B. "Comfort Through Dialogue." (Feb. 1987)
- O'Donnell, Anne. "Cicero, Gregory the Great, and Thomas More." (1989)
- Wegemer, Gerard. "A Platonic Treatment of Statesmanship." (May. 1990)
- Yee, Nancy. "More's Moriae Enconium: The Perfect Fool." (May. 1990)
- Bore, Isabelle. "Thomas More et le Grand Turc: Variations sur le Théme des Invasions Ottamanes." (Dec. 2011)
- McCutcheon, Elizabeth. "Wings and Crosses: Boethius's De Consolatione Philosophiae and More's Dialogue of Comfort against Tribulation and Other Writings." (Dec. 2013)
- Boyle, John F. "Thomas More as Theologian in His Dialogue of Comfort against Tribulation." (June 2015)
- Wegemer, Gerard. "The 'secret of his heart': What Was Thomas More's?" (June 2015)
- Koterski, Joseph. "Thomas More and the 'Prayer for Detachment.'" (June 2015)
- De Marchi, Carlo. "Thomas Aquinas, Thomas More and the Vindication of Humor as a Virtue: Eutrapelia and Iucunditas." (June 2015)
- Stevenson, William B. "Suffering and Spiritedness: The Doctrine of Comfort and the Drama of Thumos in More's Dialogue of Comfort against Tribulation."(June 2015)
- Kelly, Michael. "Mankind, Matter, and More: Sacred Materiality in the Tower Works of More." (June 2015)
- Phélippeau, Marie-Claire. "Thomas More, the Mystic?" (June 2015)
- Karlin, Louis W., and David R. Oakley. "The Role of Humor in Reforming the Imagination in St. Thomas More's The Sadness of Christ and A Dialogue of Comfort." (June 2015)

== Editions ==
- A dialoge of comfort against tribulacion, made by Syr Thomas More Knyght, and set foorth by the name of an Hungarien, not before this time imprinted. London: Richard Tottel, 1553.
- A dialogue of cumfort against tribulation, made by the right vertuous, wise and learned man, Sir Thomas More, sometime L. Chanceller of England, which he wrote in the Tower of London, An. 1534. and entituled thus: a dialogue of cumfort against tribulation, made by an Hungarian in Latin, and translated out of Latin into French, & out of French into English. Now newly set foorth, with many places restored and corrected by conferences of sundrie copies. Antwerp: John Fowler, 1573.
- Dialogue of Comfort against Tribulation, made by the right virtuous, wise and learned man, Sir Thomas More, sometime Lord Chancellor of England, which he wrote in the Town of London AD 1534. London: Charles Dolman, 1847. Available at Internet Archive
- A Dialogue of Comfort against Tribulation, made in the year 1534; a modernised version, edited by Philip E. Hallett. London: Burns Oates & Washbourne, 1937.
- A Dialogue of Comfort against Tribulation, edited by Monica Stevens. London: Sheed and Ward, 1951. Available at Project Gutenberg
- A Dialogue of Comfort against Tribulation, edited by Leland Miles. Bloomington and London: Indiana University Press, 1966.
- A Dialogue of Comfort against Tribulation, edited by Louis L. Martz and Frank Manley. Yale Edition of the Complete Works of St. Thomas More, vol. 12. New Haven: Yale University Press, 1976.
- Utopia and A Dialogue of Comfort Against Tribulation, edited by Richard Marius. London: J. M. Dent, 1993.

== Translations ==
- Il dialogo del conforto nelle tribolazioni, translated by Alberto Castelli. Rome: Studium, 1970.
- Trostgespräch im Leid, translated by Jürgen Beer. Düsseldorf: Droste, 1988.
- Dialogue du réconfort, translated by Germain Marc'hadour and Jocelyne Malhomme. Turnhout: Brepols, 2010.
- Erősítő párbeszéd balsors idején / Thomas Morus; translated by Gergely Zsuzsa. Budapest: A Dunánál, 2004.
