= Rosh Tzurim =

Israeli settlement in the West Bank

Rosh Tzurim: רֹאשׁ צוּרִים (Hebrew); روش صوريم (Arabic)
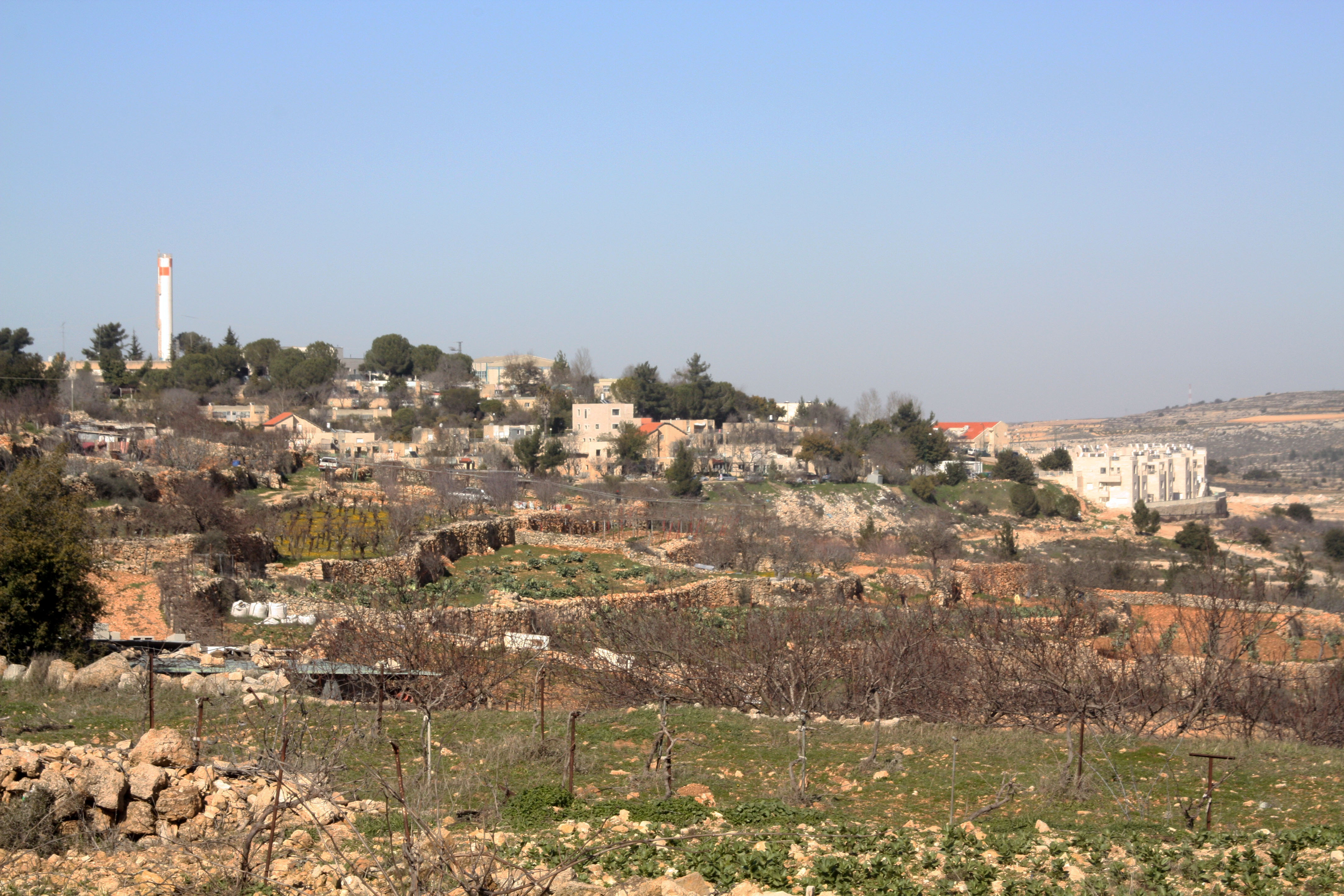

- Location within the Southern West Bank
- Coordinates: 31°40′1″N 35°7′32″E
- Country: Palestine
- District: Judea and Samaria Area
- Council: Gush Etzion
- Region: West Bank
- Affiliation: Religious Kibbutz Movement
- Founded: 1969
- Founder: Bnei Akiva Religious Scouts and Nahal
- Population (2024): 1,157
- Website: r-tzurim.co.il

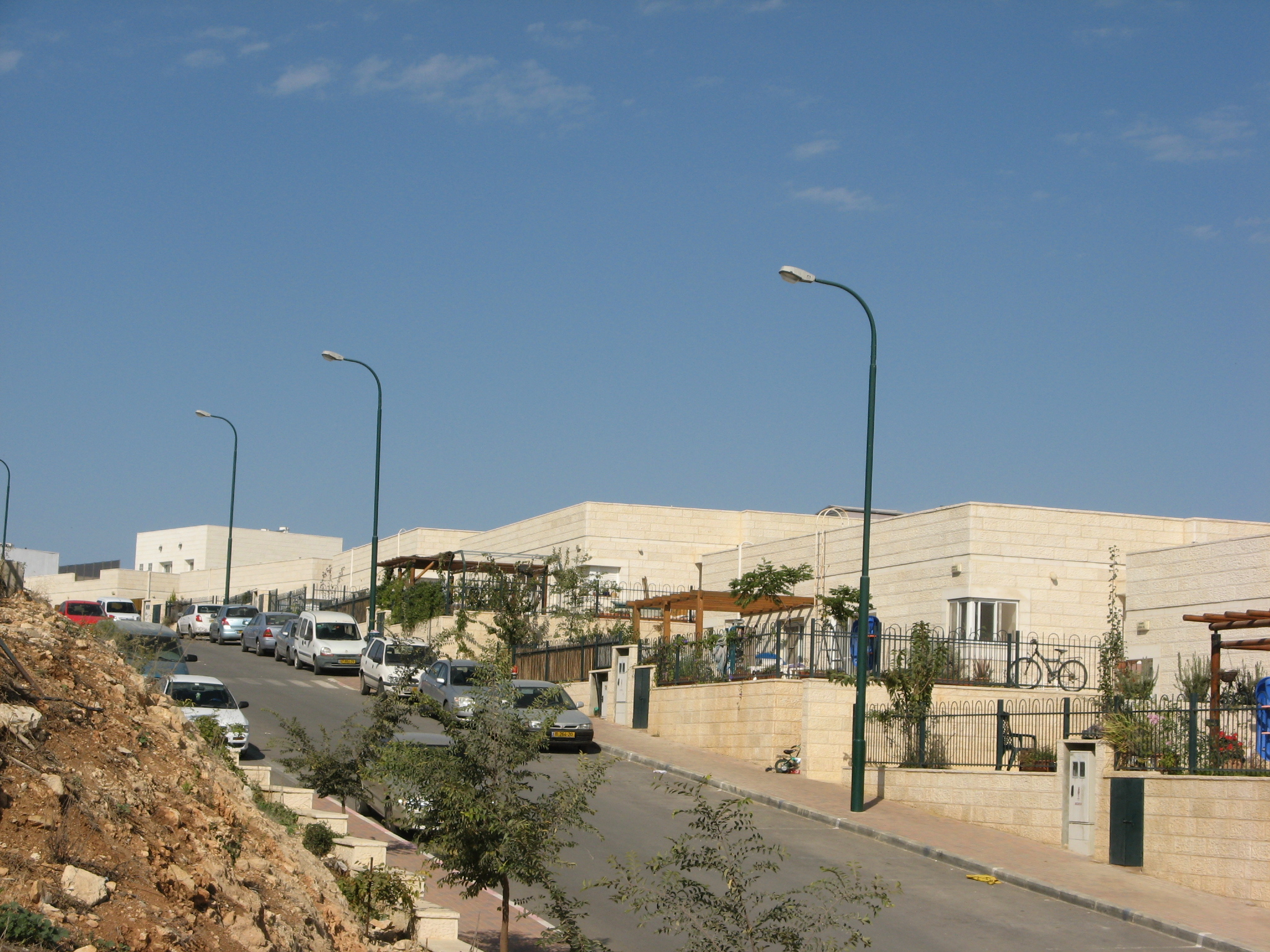
Private homes in Kibbutz Rosh Tzurim

Rosh Tzurim (Hebrew: רֹאשׁ צוּרִים, lit. 'Top of the Rocks') is an Israeli settlement and religious kibbutz in the West Bank established in 1969. It is located about 20 kilometers (12 mi) south of Jerusalem, 3.9 km east of the Green Line, inside the barrier wall. A member of the Religious Kibbutz Movement, it falls under the jurisdiction of the Gush Etzion Regional Council. In 2024 it had a population of 1,157.

The international community considers Israeli settlements in the West Bank illegal under international law, but the Israeli government disputes this.

== Name ==
The name originates from the Biblical passage "For from the top of the crags I see him" (Num 23:9) - just like the neighbouring village Gevaot.

== History ==
According to ARIJ, Israel confiscated land from two nearby Palestinian villages in order to construct Rosh Tzurim: 110 dunams from Nahalin, and 780 dunams from Khirbet Beit Zakariyyah.

The settlement was established in 1969 by members of Bnei Akiva Religious Scouts and Nahal soldiers.

Rosh Tzurim is located on the site of the ancient Beth Zechariah and on a hilltop that had previously been occupied by Ein Tzurim, a kibbutz that was destroyed in the 1948 Arab-Israeli War by the Jordanian Arab Legion and later re-established in the Lakhish area.

Rosh Tzurim went through a privatization process, first through the rental of available houses, and later an additional neighborhood, Nof Tzurim, was built on the kibbutz.

== Economy ==
The kibbutz raises turkeys, produces milk and grows grapes for wine production along with other fruits.
