= J. B. Trapp =

New Zealand-born British academic

Joseph Burney Trapp CBE FBA FSA (16 July 1925 – 13 July 2005) was the director of the Warburg Institute and Professor of the History of the Classical Tradition at London University from 1976 to 1990.

== Life ==
Trapp was born in Carterton, New Zealand, on 16 July 1925, and was educated at Dannevirke School. He graduated MA from Victoria University College in Wellington, New Zealand in 1947. He began his career as an academic at that institution in 1950, after a spell working at the Alexander Turnbull Library from 1946 to 1950.

In 1951, he emigrated to the United Kingdom, where he worked first at Reading University and then, from 1953 at the Warburg Institute, London University. At the Warburg he was assistant librarian (1953-1966) and librarian (1966-1976), before succeeding Ernst Gombrich as director (1976-1990).

Trapp married Elayne Falla, a fellow Victoria University alumni, in 1953 in England. He died in London on 14 July 2005, survived by Elayne, their two sons and five grandchildren. His father-in-law was Sir Robert Falla.

== Works ==
Trapp's first publication was a history of rugby in Victoria.

His most enduring work is his critical edition of The Apology of Sir Thomas More, published in 1979 as part of the Yale Edition of the Complete Works of St. Thomas More. He also published a volume of Essays in the Renaissance and Classical Tradition (1990) and Studies of Petrarch and His Influence (2003). With Lotte Hellinga he was co-editor of The Cambridge History of the Book in Britain, 1400-1557 (1999).

His work on John Colet and other English humanists, and his study of Petrarch, were published in the Journal of the Warburg and Courtauld Institutes for many years.

- 1990: Gray lectures at Cambridge
- 1991: Panizzi lectures at the British Library, Erasmus, Colet, and More
- 1994: Lyell Reader at Oxford

== Awards and honours ==
Trapp became a Fellow of the Society of Antiquaries in 1978 and a Fellow of the British Academy in 1980. In 1990, on his retirement from the Directorship of the Warburg Institute he was presented with a Festschrift in his honour. In the same year he was appointed a CBE.
