= Nahalin =

- Municipality type C

Arabic transcription(s)
  - Arabic: نحالين
  - Latin: Nahaleen (official)
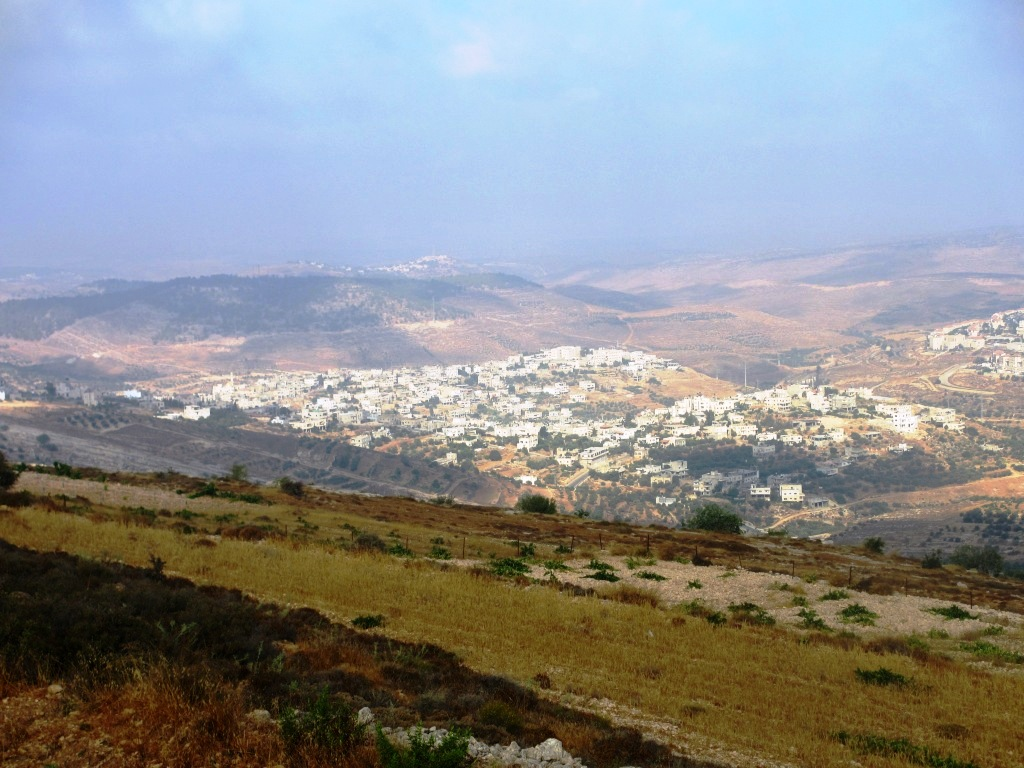
- Nahalin, 2012

- Location of Nahalin within Palestine
- Coordinates: 31°41′05″N 35°06′57″E
- Palestine grid: 161/121
- State: State of Palestine
- Governorate: Bethlehem

Government
  - Type: Municipality
  - Head of Municipality: Salah Fanoon elected 2021

Area
  - Total: 16.1 km^{2} (6.2 sq mi)

Population (2017)
  - Total: 8,741
  - Density: 543/km^{2} (1,410/sq mi)
- Name meaning: From Hebrew נחל: "A water-course"

Nahalin, also spelled Nahaleen, (Arabic: نحالين) is a Palestinian village located in the Bethlehem Governorate of the State of Palestine, to the southwest of Bethlehem in the West Bank. The village was well known for beekeeping and tens of beehives still exist in Nahalin today. The village is also known locally for its almond and olive trees, vineyards, parsley and vegetables, namely onions and beans. The built-up area of Nahalin consists of roughly 730 dunams, 20 of which make up the old center of the village. The village had a population of 8,741 in 2017.

== Etymology ==
Conder asserts that the name Nehalin is derived from the biblical Hebrew נחל (nahal), "torrent", which has since been replaced by the Arabic word wadi but occasionally preserved in the name Nehalin, which designates locations in or close to large torrents. Palmer also writes that the name Nehalin is derived from Hebrew נחל, which he translates as "a water-course".

In Arabic, the name Nahl means a bee. The word nahaleen is Arabic for those who collect honey from bees.

== Location ==
The village is located inside an enclave in the Gush Etzion settlement bloc, surrounded by the Israeli settlements of Gvaot, Rosh Tzurim, Neve Daniel and Betar Illit. After the Oslo Accords in 1995, 91% of Nahalin land was classified as Area C, under full Israeli control, while the remaining 9% is Area B, meaning that civil affairs have been under the control of the Palestinian National Authority and security matters under the control of the Israel Defense Forces.

== Archaeology ==
Potsherds from the Byzantine period have been found at a hilltop. Modern Nahalin was built on the remains of a medieval-era village.

An archeological site known as Khirbet el-Kabra is situated on the western outskirts of the village. Gershon Galil suggested to identify Khirbet el-Kabra with the biblical Nehelam, home of Shemaiah the Nehelamite, who was mentioned in the Book of Jeremiah as false prophet who went with the captives to Babylon and who opposed Jeremiah (Jeremiah 29:31–32). According to Galil, the modern-day village of Nahalin probably preserves the ancient Hebrew name.

== History ==
Historically, Nahalin was frequented by Bedouin and was well known for its tradition of beekeeping.

=== Mamluk period ===
Nahalin was one of the villages mentioned in a corpus of waqf documents stored in Jerusalem dating to the first decade of the 14th century, during Mamluk rule in Palestine (1260–1516). The waqf to which Nahalin owed its agricultural revenues was for the benefit of the Ibrahimi Mosque (Cave of the Patriarchs). Two individuals from the village were named in the document from 9 August 1308: Yusuf ibn Qasim ibn Sulayman and Abd al-Nasir ibn Ahmad ibn Nassar, both of whom owed a debt of 6,000 dirhams to the waqf. According to historian Yossef Rapoport, at that time, Nahalin had a significant Christian population and its residents mainly cultivated orchards.

=== Ottoman period ===
Palestine was incorporated into the Ottoman Empire in 1516, and in 1596 Nahalin appeared in Ottoman tax registers as being in the Nahiya of Quds (Jerusalem) of the Liwa of Quds. It had a population of 40 Muslim households and 16 Christian households. They paid a fixed tax-rate of 33.3 % on agricultural products, including wheat, barley, grape syrup or molasses, and goats or beehives; a total of 3,880 Akçe. Later sources no longer refer to the Christian community, and Bagatti suggested the Christians in the village had converted to Islam.

The French explorer Victor Guérin visited the village in the 1863, and he described it as "a jumble of small houses", with tobacco plantations surrounding it. Martin Hartmann found Nahalin to have 17 houses. In 1883, PEF's Survey of Western Palestine (SWP) described Nahalin as "A village of moderate size, on a kind of natural terrace on the side of a ridge, with a great valley to the north..[..] To the north is a spring in the valley; there is also a second spring to the south.[..] To the east is a Mukam, with two large oak-trees, sacred to Haj 'Aleiyan." "There is a tradition about tomb of Haj 'Aleiyan, of whom it is related that, having been refused entrance into the mosques because of his ragged and filthy appearance, he spread his Abba on the sea and performed his prayers on it." In 1896 the population of Nahalin was estimated to be about 162 persons.

=== British Mandate era ===
In the 1922 census of Palestine, conducted by the British Mandate authorities, Nahalin had a population of 316; 312 Muslims and 4 Christians, where the Christians were all Orthodox. In the 1931 census the population of Nahhalin was a total of 440, (3 Christians and the rest Muslim), in 98 inhabited houses. In the 1945 statistics the population of Nahalin was 620, all Muslims, who owned 16,144 dunams of land according to an official land and population survey. Of this, 1,068 dunams were plantations and irrigable land, 4,659 for cereals, while 63 dunams were built-up (urban) land.

=== Jordanian era ===
In the wake of the 1948 Arab–Israeli War, and after the 1949 Armistice Agreements, Nahalin came under Jordanian rule.

On March 28, 1954, an Israeli raid by Unit 101 on an Arab Legion base 4 kilometers outside Nahalin, where the Israeli forces missed the base and placed explosive charges and destroyed seven houses, including the mosque of the village killed five national guards, three legionnaires (who were travelling from the Arab Legion base to the village) and one woman, and wounded eighteen civilians including men, women and children. According to David Tal, the raid was the first of Israel's reprisal raids against a military target in Jordanian controlled territory.

In 1961, the population of Nahhalin was 1,015.

=== 1967-present ===
Since the Six-Day War in 1967, Nahalin has been under Israeli occupation. The population in the 1967 census conducted by the Israeli authorities was 1,109.

From 1988-1991, journalist Helen Winternitz spent 3 years in Nahalin, publishing her experiences in the book A Season of Stones.

During the early months of the First Intifada on 13 April 1989, five villagers were killed by Israel Border Police during an early morning raid. The villagers claimed the security forces opened fire without provocation as they were leaving morning prayers at the mosque. Then General Amram Mitzna claimed his forces had come under attack from about 100 stone-throwing youths. On 30 April 1989, preliminary findings of a military inquiry into the events indicated that the border police unit involved in the raid had "lost control and fired excessively". In May 1989, the military inquiry announced that disciplinary action against four officers and seven border policemen would be taken for "misconduct". During the funeral for those killed Walid Najajra, aged 23, was shot in the head by Israeli soldiers. He died a week later in the Makassed Hospital. Reports in the Israeli press stated that the army had launched an investigation.

After the 1995 accords, 9% of the village land has been classified as Area B, while the remaining 91% has been classified as Area C.

Large parts of Nahalin's land are confiscated by Military Orders by declaring it Israeli "State Land". Israel has afterwards used the confiscated land to construct Israeli settlements; 135 dunum of Nahalin land went to construct Geva’ot, 1166 dunum went to Betar Illit, and 110 dunum went to Rosh Zurim.

Since the beginning of the al-Aqsa Intifada, severe restrictions on movement have been placed on all residents. According to the United Nations Relief and Works Agency (UNRWA), from the intifada's beginning in September 2000 until the road's November 2003 reopening with IDF checkpoint monitoring, the cluster of villages represented by Nahalin, Husan and Battir were totally closed off and the only access was on foot via the Husan/al-Khadr junction. In 2004, all roads but one were reopened, and residents can now move more freely. In November of that year, USAID supported the paving of that road.

In the 2005 municipal elections in Nahalin, all ten elected candidates stood as independents. The candidate with the most votes was Qassim Yousif Mahmoud Awad, who got 1120 votes.

According to the Palestinian Central Bureau of Statistics, the town had a population of over 6,409 in mid-year 2006, of whom 35% are under the age of 18. Approximately 150 - 200 persons are registered with UNRWA as refugees of the 1948 war. Villagers carry a West Bank ID card.

In 2006, about 90% of the population between the ages of 18 and 35 are unemployed. The natural growth of the village will become a problem in the future due to lack of living space. Nahalin will become entirely closed in by both the expanding settlements and the Israeli West Bank barrier, placing severe constraints on the movement of residents and their access to services outside the village.

== Bibliography ==
- Barron, J.B., ed. (1923). Palestine: Report and General Abstracts of the Census of 1922. Government of Palestine.
- Conder, C.R.; Kitchener, H.H. (1883). The Survey of Western Palestine: Memoirs of the Topography, Orography, Hydrography, and Archaeology. Vol. 3. London: Committee of the Palestine Exploration Fund.
- Dauphin, C. (1998). La Palestine byzantine, Peuplement et Populations. BAR International Series 726 (in French). Vol. III : Catalogue. Oxford: Archeopress. ISBN 0-860549-05-4.
- Government of Jordan, Department of Statistics (1964). First Census of Population and Housing. Volume I: Final Tables; General Characteristics of the Population (PDF).
- Government of Palestine, Department of Statistics (1945). Village Statistics, April, 1945.
- Guérin, V. (1869). Description Géographique Historique et Archéologique de la Palestine (in French). Vol. 1: Judee, pt. 3. Paris: L'Imprimerie Nationale.
- Hadawi, S. (1970). Village Statistics of 1945: A Classification of Land and Area ownership in Palestine. Palestine Liberation Organization Research Center.
- Hartmann, M. (1883). "Die Ortschaftenliste des Liwa Jerusalem in dem türkischen Staatskalender für Syrien auf das Jahr 1288 der Flucht (1871)". Zeitschrift des Deutschen Palästina-Vereins. 6: 102–149.
- Hütteroth, W.-D.; Abdulfattah, K. (1977). Historical Geography of Palestine, Transjordan and Southern Syria in the Late 16th Century. Erlanger Geographische Arbeiten, Sonderband 5. Erlangen, Germany: Vorstand der Fränkischen Geographischen Gesellschaft. ISBN 3-920405-41-2.
- Mills, E., ed. (1932). Census of Palestine 1931. Population of Villages, Towns and Administrative Areas. Jerusalem: Government of Palestine.
- Palmer, E.H. (1881). The Survey of Western Palestine: Arabic and English Name Lists Collected During the Survey by Lieutenants Conder and Kitchener, R. E. Transliterated and Explained by E.H. Palmer. Committee of the Palestine Exploration Fund.
- Rapoport, Yossef (2025). Becoming Arab: The Formation of Arab Identity in the Medieval Middle East. Princeton: Princeton University Press. ISBN 9780691210636.
- Schick, C. (1896). "Zur Einwohnerzahl des Bezirks Jerusalem". Zeitschrift des Deutschen Palästina-Vereins. 19: 120–127.
