= Gevaot =

Israeli settlement in West Bank

Gevaot: גְּבָעוֹת (Hebrew); جفاعوت (Arabic)
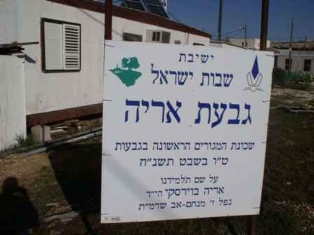
- Etymology: Hills
- Location within the Southern West Bank
- Coordinates: 31°40′43″N 35°6′5″E
- Country: Palestine
- District: Judea and Samaria Area
- Council: Gush Etzion
- Region: West Bank
- Founded: 1984, legalized 2025
- Founder: Nahal

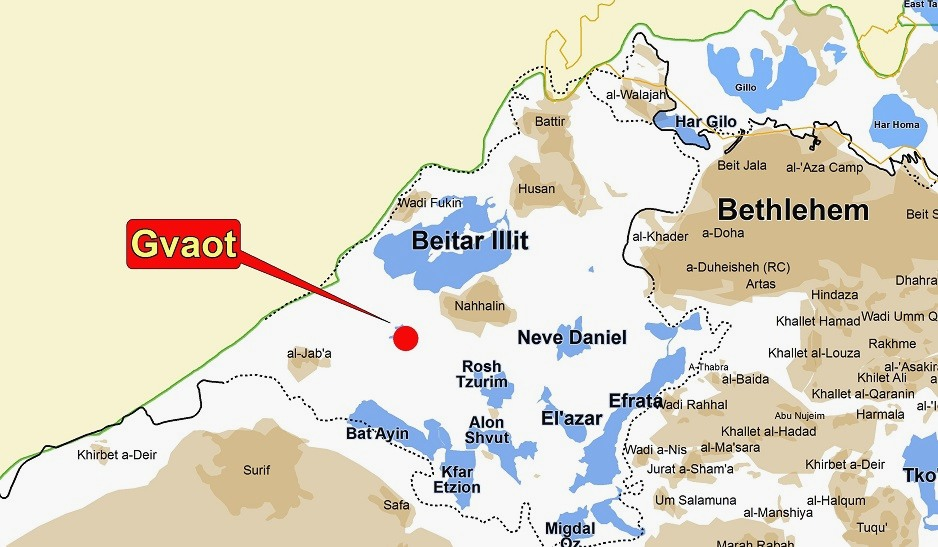
Map

Gevaot (Hebrew: גְּבָעוֹת) is an Israeli settlement located in the West Bank, in the westernmost area of the Gush Etzion settlement bloc. It is named for the hills (gevaot in Hebrew) from which Balaam spoke, according to Numbers 23:9, just like the neighbouring settlement Rosh Tzurim.

On 31 August 2014, Israel declared 988 acres of land surrounding Gevaot as part of state land in West Bank. Gevaot had yet to be recognized by the Israeli government, due to the lack of defined boundaries, this land appropriation is the first required step to officially recognizing Gevaot.

As of August 2014, there were 10 families living in Gevaot. In 2025, the Israeli government legalized Gevaot.

The international community considers Israeli settlements in the West Bank illegal under international law, but the Israeli government disputes this.

== Location ==
The location is strategically located above the highway from Gush Etzion to Beit Shemesh and the Shfela. It is administered by the Gush Etzion Regional Council. Gush Etzion's main communities were founded on land purchased by Jews prior to the establishment of Israel, although "Arab soldiers destroyed the communities when they fought against Israel's founding" in the 1948 Arab–Israeli War.

== History ==
A 1982 Israeli government decision led to the construction of an Israel Defense Forces Nahal outpost at the site in 1984.

According to ARIJ, Israel confiscated 135 dunams of land from the nearby Palestinian village of Nahalin in order to construct Gevaot.

In 1997, the base was transferred to the Shvut Yisrael Hesder Yeshiva, which moved there from nearby Efrat. The site is on privately owned Palestinian land, and outpost was built without zoning permits. Over the following decade the yeshiva developed the location as a housing area for its married students and their families. The yeshiva itself moved back to Efrat in 2003.

In 2013, the Israeli government announced plans to expand the settlement and opened bids for 1,000 additional housing units. As of August 2014, 523 of the 1,000 units were under construction. The area was designated as a neighbourhood of Alon Shvut, though that is several miles away, and, in the Israeli view, as a neighbourhood of a pre-existing settlement, new construction there would not constitute the creation of a new settlement.

On March 22, 2025, the Israeli government legalized Gevaot.

== 2014 land reclassification ==
In late August 2014, in what was widely reported as a land grab, the IDF's Civil Administration of the West Bank announced it was appropriating 988 acres (1.54 square miles), defining it as Israeli state land as opposed to private Palestinian land south of Bethlehem, a seizure which prohibits Palestinians from using the area. According to Peace Now, it was the largest confiscation of Palestinian land in three decades.

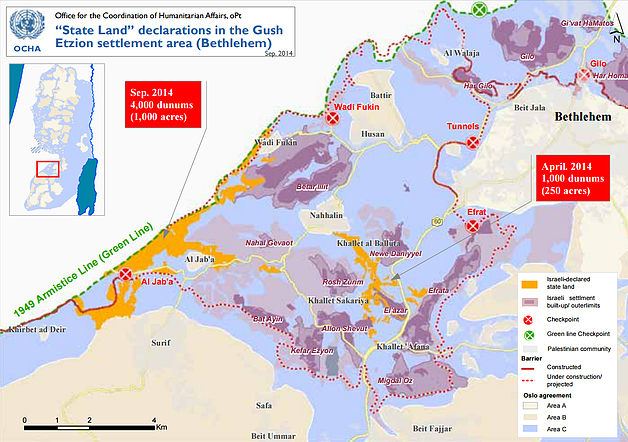
2014 Declarations of "State Land" in Gush Etzion settlement bloc

The move, first prompted by a suggestion at a security meeting by Moshe Ya'alon, was explained both as a response to the murder of three Israeli teenagers and as a measure adopted by Benjamin Netanyahu to placate government allies to his right who were critical of his handling of Hamas in the 2014 Israel–Gaza conflict. The land belongs to the five Palestinian villages of Jab'a, Surif, Wadi Fukin, Husan and Nahalin. The IDF maintains that there are no Palestinian claims on the land, but that those who felt they had valid claims, could appeal within 45 days of the announcement. Palestinians in the area, including the mayor of Surif, Ahmad Lafi, said that land belongs to them and that they harvested olive trees there.

The land making up the Gevaot land appropriation is located on the Palestinian side of the current route for the Israeli West Bank barrier.

=== Reactions ===
==== Israel ====
- The move was hailed by the Gush Etzion settlements council as an opportunity to expand Gevaot.
- Avigdor Lieberman, Israel's foreign minister, said that the Gush Etzion area "would remain a part of the state of Israel" in any future peace agreement.
- Naftali Bennett, Israel's economy minister, described the move as an "appropriate Zionist response to murder", adding: "What we did yesterday was a display of Zionism. Building is our answer to murder."
- Davidi Perl, speaking on behalf of the Gush Etzion Regional Council, hailing the announcement as paving the way to the establishment of a Gevaot city, stated that: "The murderers of the three teens wanted to plant fear in our hearts and disrupt our daily lives, and our answer is strengthening the settlements and constructing both inside the main blocs and outside of them."
- Michael Oren, Israel's former ambassador to the United States, commented that it was part of a pattern: "The government does something that is unpalatable to the right wing, whether it be making concessions in the peace process or, in this case, agreeing to a cease-fire in Gaza, and then it attempts to palliate the right by building in Judea and Samaria or, in this case, reclassifying land."
- Yariv Oppenheimer of Peace Now described the measure as "a knife to the back of Mahmoud Abbas" in that while the government negotiates with Hamas, the measure has undermined peace talks with Palestinian moderates on the West Bank.

==== Palestine ====
- Hanan Ashrawi, a Palestine Liberation Organization (PLO) leader, stated that the move: "clearly represents Israel's deliberate intent to wipe out any Palestinian presence on the land and to willfully impose a de facto one-state solution." Saeb Erekat called for diplomatic action against Israel.

==== International ====
- The United States responded to the announcement by rebuking Israel for taking measures that were 'counter-productive' to the two-state solution in peace talks. Speaking anonymously, a U.S. State Department official, said the U.S. had requested of Israel that it reverse the decision since it contradicted "Israel’s stated goal of a negotiated two-state solution with the Palestinians.” According to Israeli sources, the decision "drove the Americans nuts", and the United States administration was mulling measures to respond to the declaration, which had not been cleared with them.
- The expropriation was also condemned by the United Nations, PLO, United Kingdom Egypt, France, Spain, Russia, European Union, Turkey, Norway, Japan and Amnesty International.
- Richard Ottaway cited the expropriation as an 'outrageous provocation', the last of many landgrabs in the West bank, which tipped him, a long-time supporter of Israel, into casting an abstention vote in a British Parliamentary resolution supporting recognition of Palestine as a state.
- The New York Times' belief was that the timing of the decision appeared to indicate a political desire to compensate settlers in the West Bank and punish the Palestinian population.
