= A Season of Stones =

1991 Non-fiction book by Helen Winternitz

- Author: Helen Winternitz
- Language: English
- Publisher: Atlantic Monthly Press
- Publication date: October 1991
- Publication place: United States
- Pages: 303 pages
- ISBN: 0871135140

A Season of Stones is a 1991 non-fiction book by Helen Winternitz. The book was released in October 1991 through the Atlantic Monthly Press and centers upon Winternitz's time in the West Bank village of Nahalin.

== Synopsis ==
The book follows Winterintz during her stay in Nahalin during the late 1980s. During her stay she is accused of being a spy and at one point is nearly stoned to death. She witnesses land being taken away from the villagers for subsidized Israeli settlements and survives by learning Arabic.

== Reception ==
Reception for the book was positive, with the Los Angeles Times calling it "an endearing guide". Reviewers for The Baltimore Sun, Library Journal, and Foreign Affairs all gave positive reviews for A Season of Stones. Richard Marius gave a positive but controversial review for A Season of Stones in Harvard's alumni magazine, which prompted Al Gore to rescind an offer of employment.
