= Richard Marius =

American academic and writer (1933–1999)

Richard Curry Marius
- Born: July 29, 1933; Dixie Lee Junction, Tennessee, US
- Died: November 5, 1999 (aged 66)
- Resting place: Sleepy Hollow Cemetery, Concord, Massachusetts
- Education: University of Tennessee; Southern Baptist Theological Seminary; Yale University
- Occupations: Writer; teacher; academic
- Spouses: Gail Smith (div.); Lanier Smythe
- Children: 3
- Writing career
- Language: English

Richard Curry Marius (July 29, 1933 – November 5, 1999) was an American academic and writer.

He was a scholar of the Reformation, novelist of the American South, speechwriter, and teacher of writing and English literature at Harvard University. He was widely published, leaving behind major biographies of Thomas More and Martin Luther, four novels set in his native Tennessee, several books on writing, and a host of scholarly articles for academic journals and mainstream book reviews.

== Life ==
Marius began life on a farm in East Tennessee, evolved into a figure of 1960s campus political activism, and became a respected Reformation historian on the Harvard faculty. Through it all, he had a complicated and lifelong engagement with Christianity, wrestling with matters of faith—and its loss—both in his scholarship and his novels.

=== Childhood ===
Marius was born in Dixie Lee Junction, Tennessee, on July 29, 1933, and grew up on a 20-acre (81,000 m^{2}) farm in Loudon County, Tennessee, along with a sister and two brothers. His father was an immigrant from Greece who earned a chemical engineering degree in Belgium before settling in the United States, where he managed the foundry at the Lenoir Car Works of the Southern Railway. His mother was a former reporter for The Knoxville News-Sentinel in the 1920s and 1930s.

=== Religion ===
Marius' mother, Eunice, was a devout Southern Baptist and fundamentalist Christian whose religious faith had a particularly strong influence over him. His love of literature and poetic imagery may have been formed by her habit of reading to her children every day from the King James Version of the Bible. After Marius' older brother was born with Down syndrome, his mother told Marius how she had prayed that if her next son were born healthy, he would devote himself to Jesus. Richard Marius was born healthy.

As a young man, Marius shared his mother's fundamentalism, attending daily Christian services and carrying a Bible with him in college. He even felt a calling to be a minister, earning a divinity degree. But he grew increasingly skeptical of religion and lost his faith in his twenties, even though he devoted much of the rest of his life to studying Reformation-era Christianity. Marius later attributed his loss of faith in part to his intellectual engagement with W.T. Stace, an English-born philosopher. He was particularly affected by Stace's essay Man Against Darkness, which includes the statement that:

The problem of evil assumes the existence of a world-purpose. What, we are really asking, is the purpose of suffering? It seems purposeless. Our question of the why of evil assumes the view that the world has a purpose, and what we want to know is how suffering fits into and advances this purpose. The modern view is that suffering has no purpose because nothing that happens has any purpose: the world is run by causes, not by purposes.

His novel An Affair of Honor (2001) features a protagonist, Charles Alexander, who like Marius becomes caught between the traditional morality of his upbringing and the freethinking he encounters at the University of Tennessee and in W.T. Stace. As Marius evolved toward atheism, he developed what became a lifelong distaste for the religious right. But toward the end of his life, he began attending services again, first at Memorial Church in Harvard Yard and later at a Unitarian church.

=== Education ===
Marius earned a B.S. in journalism in 1954 from the University of Tennessee, where he first gained recognition for his writing skills. Attending college classes in the morning, he worked in the afternoons as a reporter for the Lenoir City News, writing a column called "Rambling with Richard". In 1955, he married Gail Smith. They had two children, Richard and Fred, before divorcing. Marius then enrolled in a divinity program at the New Orleans Baptist Theological Seminary despite an increasing crisis of faith. He took a year off, spending 1956–57 in Europe as a Rotary Fellow in history at the University of Strasbourg, then returned to another Southern Baptist Theological Seminary in Louisville, Kentucky, from which he graduated with a B.D. in 1958. Immediately afterward, he moved to New Haven, Connecticut, to begin graduate work in Reformation history at Yale University. Marius earned a M.A. in 1959 and a Ph.D. in 1962, after writing a dissertation entitled "Thomas More and the Heretics".

=== University of Tennessee ===
After graduating from Yale, Marius taught history at Gettysburg College from 1962 to 1964, before returning to his home state to take a position on the faculty of the University of Tennessee in Knoxville. According to his friend and colleague, University of Tennessee professor Milton Klein, Marius quickly became one of the most popular humanities teachers on the campus:

At Tennessee, he acquired a reputation as a brilliant teacher... earning the respect and admiration of a host of undergraduate and graduate students. He was one of those rare teachers whose 8 a.m. classes in Western Civilization were filled to capacity and whose lectures were so interesting that unregistered students sought to sneak in to hear them. His popularity was not diminished by his avoidance of short-answer tests and his insistence that each student write a short essay every two weeks.

During this period, Marius also became an outspoken critic of the Vietnam War and an early organizer of protests against the conflict, as well as against the Ku Klux Klan. Most notably, shortly after the Kent State shootings, he co-organized a protest at a 1970 Billy Graham evangelistic crusade rally in the university's football stadium at which President Richard Nixon was an announced, invited guest. Although Marius' plan was for the 1,000 or so anti-war protesters to hold a "silent" protest amid the 70,000 pro-Graham spectators in the stadium, the protest turned unruly.

Marius also joined three other junior faculty members that year in suing the university when its chancellor refused to allow the black comedian and anti-war activist Dick Gregory to speak on campus, winning a court order to create an "open campus" by ending a university policy of requiring administrative approval before student-invited speakers could come to the campus. He also successfully pushed to end the university's practice of holding sectarian religious convocations.

Marius' sometimes provocative statements and political efforts, which clashed with the prevailing view in the conservative state of Tennessee, led to threats against him and his family. During the Dick Gregory fight, he purchased a revolver for protection, which he said he sometimes slept with.

This intense period was also marked by other beginnings. Marius wrote his first novel, The Coming of Rain, published in 1969. The following year, he married Lanier Smythe, an art historian who later became chair of humanities at Boston's Suffolk University; they had a son named John. In 1974, he published his first scholarly book, a short biography of Martin Luther (a subject to which he returned in full 25 years later). In 1976, he published his second novel, Bound for the Promised Land.

Although Marius left Tennessee for Harvard in 1978, he maintained ties to his home state's university. For example, he founded and directed an annual summer writing conference, the Governor's Academy for Teachers of Writing, on the Knoxville campus. In 1999, the University of Tennessee College of Communications gave him its Distinguished Alumnus Award.

=== Harvard University ===
In 1978, Marius joined Harvard's Faculty of Arts and Sciences, where he was the director of the Expository Writing Program until 1993. He spent the last twenty years of his life at Harvard, producing most of his major work there, including his biographies of Thomas More and Martin Luther and his final two novels.

In addition to his work as director of the writing program, his scholarly research, and his fiction writing, Marius taught a series of courses for the university's Department of English and American Literature and Language. He taught a lecture course on William Shakespeare's history plays and a freshman-only seminar on Southern writers, focusing on Mark Twain and William Faulkner. He also served as a tutor and thesis advisor to numerous students. In 1990, the Harvard Undergraduate Council voted to give him the Levenson Award for "outstanding teaching by a senior faculty member".

Marius also played a broader role in campus life. He coached the students charged with delivering annual commencement addresses each year and helped Harvard's presidents develop their graduation speeches. He also for years wrote the university's citations for the honorary degrees awarded to luminaries at commencement exercises. In 1993, Marius was awarded the Harvard Foundation Medal for his efforts to improve racial relations. He served as a faculty advisor to the Signet Society, a creative arts club, and he and his wife spent a semester during the 1996–97 academic year as acting masters of Adams House, an undergraduate residence hall.

=== Death ===
After being diagnosed with pancreatic cancer in 1998, Marius retired from teaching in order to focus on completing his final novel, An Affair of Honor, amid the rigors of chemotherapy. He succeeded, turning in the final manuscript several months before he died at his home on November 5, 1999. His ashes were buried below Author's Ridge in Sleepy Hollow Cemetery in Concord, Massachusetts, near the graves of Ralph Waldo Emerson, Henry David Thoreau, Nathaniel Hawthorne, and Louisa May Alcott.

== Al Gore–Israel controversy ==
In 1995, Vice President Al Gore personally offered Marius a White House speechwriting position heading into the 1996 presidential campaign. Marius had previously written, without pay, several speeches for his fellow Tennessee native, including a 1993 Madison Square Garden oration for the fiftieth anniversary of the Warsaw Ghetto Uprising and parts of Gore's 1994 Harvard commencement address attacking the "culture of cynicism". Marius accepted the offer to join the White House, took an eighteen-month leave of absence from Harvard, rented out his home, and prepared to move to Washington, D.C. But Gore rescinded the offer after New Republic editor-in-chief and part-time Harvard social studies lecturer Martin Peretz pressured the vice president to reverse Marius' hiring.

In a favorable 1992 review of the book A Season of Stones: Living in a Palestinian Village by Helen Winternitz, Marius had written this in Harvard's alumni magazine:

Many Israelis, the Holocaust fresh in their memory, believe that that horror gives them the right to inflict horror on others. Winternitz's account of the brutality of the Shin Bet, the Israeli secret police, is eerily similar to the stories of the Gestapo ... arbitrary arrests in the middle of the night, imprisonment without trial, beatings, refined tortures, murder, punishment of the families of suspects.

Peretz, a passionate supporter of Israel, sent Gore a copy of the 1992 review, accusing Marius of antisemitism. He told Gore, his former student when Gore was an undergraduate at Harvard, to reverse the hiring; Gore complied. According to press accounts, a Gore staffer called Marius and asked him to announce that he had changed his mind about accepting the position. But when reporters called him, Marius declined to pretend that the decision had been his.

Peretz told The Washington Post:

It's a very simple matter. What Richard Marius wrote did not go unnoticed in Cambridge and beyond, because it was the Harvard alumni magazine. When you make the Nazi analogy, it cannot be tossed off as, 'Oh, how silly of me to have done this.' When you write that, you believe it. So, once the vice president knew, he had to figure out if he wanted someone who believed that on his staff.

Marius allowed that his Gestapo–Shin Bet comparison may have been "a little bit extreme", but he refused to disavow it, insisting that he was criticizing only the harsh tactics of the secret police and otherwise supported the state of Israel. Marius said he "never had an anti-Semitic thought in his life" and that he was "just floored" by the turn of events: "I'm just sorry about it because I believe I could have helped the vice president".

Many observers have said that Peretz's charge of antisemitism on the part of Marius was false, as Marius had previously castigated figures such as Martin Luther for their antisemitic writings in his scholarly work. Marius claimed that Peretz had seen him as a rival ever since 1993, when Gore largely chose to use Marius' image-rich Holocaust speech for the Warsaw Uprising event, keeping only a paragraph from an alternate, statistics-laden speech Peretz had submitted to Gore. University of Tennessee historian Milton Klein, whose European relatives were murdered during the Holocaust in Hungary, said that he and Marius had often argued about the Israel–Palestine issue during their 26 years of friendship, but Marius had never said a single thing that indicated any antisemitic feelings. In Gore: A Political Life, ABC News correspondent Bob Zelnick wrote that Marius had no history of antisemitism and that "most [of Gore's staff] felt that Marius had been wronged and that the vice president had acted to keep Peretz happy rather than to protect his office."

== Novels ==
Marius wrote four novels based in East Tennessee from roughly 1850 to 1950. Three—The Coming of Rain (1969), After the War (1992), and An Affair of Honor (2001)—form a loose trilogy. His second novel, Bound for the Promised Land (1976), is a stand-alone work.

The Coming of Rain was Marius' first novel and established Bourbon County, a fictional landscape that closely resembled his native Loudon County and in which most of his fiction was set. The book followed the lives of a set of small-town characters in the border state in the traumatic period following the American Civil War. Joyce Carol Oates reviewed the novel for The New York Times Book Review, calling it "a slender, tragic, perhaps beautiful story of the ruins of dreams." The Book-of-the-Month Club made the novel an alternate selection. Marius later converted it into a stage play, which was produced by the Alabama Shakespeare Festival in 1998.

Bound for the Promised Land also begins in East Tennessee, but the setting soon migrates to the West. Set in the 1850s amid the Gold Rush, it follows a family in a wagon train that sets out through Indian Country for California. To research the novel, Marius retraced the trail of the wagon trains with his family.

Marius' third novel, After the War, returned to Bourbon County in the post-World War I period. Drawing on the biographical experiences of his parents, the novel concerned a Greek immigrant who moves to Tennessee after fighting in the Great War for Belgium. The protagonist marries a local woman, who becomes increasingly fundamentalist Christian as time goes on. He is also haunted by the ghosts of three friends who died in the war. Marius wanted to title the novel "Once in Arcadia", but his publisher believed that too few readers would understand the reference to the classical Greek refuge. Both Publishers Weekly and The New York Times named it one of the best novels of the year. The latter made it an "editor's choice", calling it "an old-fashioned blockbuster, richly packed with characters" and its reviewer, Robert Ward, wrote that the novel "moved me, made me laugh out loud, broke my heart."

Marius completed his last and perhaps most autobiographical novel, An Affair of Honor, several months before his death. It was published posthumously in 2001. Set in Bourbon County in 1953, the novel examines the post-World War II transition of the South through the prism of a young reporter, the son of the Greek immigrant hero of "After the War", who witnesses a man kill his unfaithful wife according to the "code of the hills", and the resulting murder trial.

== Scholarship ==
One of the pre-eminent Reformation scholars of his generation, Marius' two major scholarly works were biographies of Thomas More (1983), the English lawyer, Utopia writer, and politician who persecuted Protestants before being beheaded for refusing to accept Henry VIII's break with Catholicism, and of Martin Luther (1999), the monk whose criticism of the Catholic Church inspired the Protestant Reformation.

Both books were widely praised. The More volume was finalist for a National Book Award, and both biographies were History Book Club main selections. Both books were also controversial because they stripped their subjects of the sanctity ascribed to them by admirers, instead presenting them as human beings struggling with their beliefs, fears, ambitions, strengths, and weaknesses. Marius also judged his subjects from a modern perspective, criticizing More for religious fanaticism and intolerance because he persecuted heretics, and criticizing Luther for his anti-Semitic writings, for example.

In the final year of his life, Marius traded bitter and sometimes personal academic attacks with Heiko Oberman, a rival Reformation historian at the University of Arizona, who had written his own biography of Luther. Oberman attacked Marius for having analyzed Luther's personality from the modern psychological perspective of a man who feared death, insisting that Luther should be analyzed only in the terms of his own time—as a man who feared the Devil.

Marius also translated from Latin More's Utopia and co-edited three volumes of the Yale Edition of the Complete Works of St. Thomas More.

== Writing teacher ==
Marius served as director of Harvard's Expository Writing Program from 1978-1993. The only class that all undergraduates were required to take, Expos introduced Harvard first-year students to college-level writing. Marius developed the program's curriculum, hired much of its teaching staff, and wrote two books about writing. A Writer's Companion, now in its fifth edition, and A Short Guide to Writing About History, now in its fourth edition, are both widely used as textbooks for instructional writing programs. With Harvey Wiener, Marius also co-wrote the McGraw-Hill College Handbook.

As a teacher of writing, Marius emphasized clarity and directness. He asked his students to revise their drafts repeatedly, each time trying to communicate more simply and with fewer and shorter words. He advised making a rough outline before beginning to write and getting to the point quickly by setting up in the opening paragraph tensions that will be resolved by the end.

In his introduction to the third edition of A Writer's Companion, he wrote: "I don't care much for sappy personal writing, where writers tell me what they feel about things rather than what they know about things."

== Selected bibliography ==
=== Fiction ===
- The Coming of Rain New York: Knopf, 1969
- Bound for the Promised Land New York: Knopf, 1976
- After the War New York: Knopf, 1992
- An Affair of Honor New York: Knopf, 2001

=== Nonfiction ===
==== Books ====
- Luther New York: Lippincott, 1974; London: Quartet Books, 1975
- Thomas More: A Biography New York: Knopf, 1984; London: J. M. Dent, 1984; New York: Vintage Books, 1985
- The McGraw-Hill College Handbook (with Harvey Wiener). New York: McGraw, 1985; 2nd ed., 1988; 3rd ed., 1991; 4th ed., 1994
- A Writer's Companion New York: Knopf, 1985; 2nd ed. New York: McGraw, 1991; 3rd ed., 1994; 4th ed., 1998
- A Short Guide to Writing About History New York: HarperCollins, 1989; 2nd ed., 1994.; 3rd ed. New York: Longman, 1998; 4th ed., 2001; 5th ed., 2004
- Martin Luther: The Christian Between God and Death Cambridge, Massachusetts: Belknap, 1999
- Wrestling with God: The Meditations of Richard Marius Nancy Grisham Anderson, editor. Knoxville: University of Tennessee Press, 2006
- Reading Faulkner: Introductions to the First Thirteen Novels Nancy Grisham Anderson, editor. Knoxville: University of Tennessee Press, 2006

==== Editions ====
- The Confutation of Tyndale's Answer (with Louis Schuster et al.) New Haven: Yale UP, 1973. Vol. 8 of The Complete Works of St. Thomas More
- A Dialogue Concerning Heresies (with Thomas M. C. Lawler and Germain Marc'hadour). New Haven: Yale UP, 1981. Vol. 6 of The Complete Works of St. Thomas More
- Letter to Bugenhagen. Supplication of Souls. Letter Against Frith (with Frank Manley et al.) New Haven: Yale UP, 1990. Vol. 7 of the Yale Edition of the Complete Works of St. Thomas More
- Utopia and A Dialogue of Comfort against Tribulation by Thomas More. London: J. M. Dent, 1993
- The Columbia Book of Civil War Poetry (with Keith Frome). New York: Columbia UP, 1994
