= Louis L. Martz =

Professor of English at Yale University

Louis L. Martz (1913–2001) was Sterling Professor of English at Yale University starting in 1971, retiring in 1984. From 1972 to 1978 he was also acting director of the Beinecke Rare Book & Manuscript Library.

From 1963 to 1997 Martz chaired the "Yale Edition of the Complete Works of St. Thomas More", himself editing volume 12 (1976), the Dialogue of Comfort against Tribulation. His other scholarly publications include The Poetry of Meditation: A Study in English Religious Literature of the Seventeenth Century (1954), Collected Poems, 1912–1944 by H.D. (1983), and Many Gods and Many Voices: The Role of the Prophet in English and American Modernism (1998).

== Sources ==
- English Professor Louis Martz, Yale Bulletin and Calendar vol. 30 no. 15 (January 18, 2002).
