= Frank Manley =

American poet (1930–2009)

- Born: November 13, 1930; Scranton, Pennsylvania, US
- Died: November 11, 2009 (aged 78); Atlanta, Georgia, U.S.
- Education: Emory University
- Occupations: Professor, writer
- Writing career
- Notable work: The Cockfighter (1998)
- Notable awards: Guggenheim Fellowship, Georgia Author of the Year Award

Frank Manley (November 13, 1930 – November 11, 2009) was an American professor and author. He taught English at Yale University and Emory University, and wrote novels, plays, stories, and poetry.

== Early life and education ==
Manley was born in Scranton, Pennsylvania, and raised in Atlanta, Georgia, the son of Aloysius F. Manley and Kathryn L. Needham Manley. He was educated at the Marist School in Atlanta and went on to study English literature at Emory University, where he earned a bachelor's degree in 1952 and master's degree in 1953. He earned a Ph.D. from Johns Hopkins University in 1959.

== Career ==
Manley taught English at Yale University from 1959 to 1964 before returning to Emory as an associate professor in 1964. He remained there until his retirement in 2000, from 1982 as Charles Howard Candler Professor of Renaissance Literature. He founded a creative writing program and co-founded the Playwriting Center.

From around 1970, Manley published as a creative artist, with poems, plays, short stories and novels to his name. He was twice awarded a Georgia Author of the Year Award, for the novel The Cockfighter (1998) and for the short story collection Among Prisoners (2000). His main academic publications were an edition of John Donne's Anniversaries (1963) and an edition of Thomas More's Dialogue of Comfort against Tribulation (1976).

== Personal life and legacy ==
Manley married Carolyn Holliday in 1952; they had two daughters. He died in 2009, in Atlanta, at the age of 78. His papers are at Emory University.

== Works ==
=== Poetry ===
- Resultances (1980)
- The Emperors (2001)

=== Plays ===
- Two Masters (1985)
- Prior Engagements (1987)
- The Evidence (1990)
- Married Life (1996)
- Learning to Dance (1998)

=== Prose fiction ===
- Within the Ribbons (1989, short stories)
- The Cockfighter (1998, novel)
- Among Prisoners (2000, short stories)
- True Hope (2002, novel)
