= Moreana =

- Discipline: Renaissance humanism, English Renaissance, English Reformation
- Language: English, French
- Edited by: Travis Curtright

Publication details
- History: 1963-present
- Publisher: Edinburgh University Press on behalf of Amici Thomae Mori (United Kingdom)
- Frequency: Biannual

Standard abbreviations
- ISO 4: Moreana

Indexing
- ISSN: 0047-8105 (print); 2398-4961 (web)
- LCCN: 89655766
- OCLC no.: 1644152

Links
- Journal homepage; Online access

Moreana is a biannual peer-reviewed academic journal covering research about Thomas More and his milieu and writings, as well as relevant broader questions of 16th-century history, literature and culture. It is published by Edinburgh University Press on behalf of Amici Thomae Mori (English: Society of Friends of Thomas More), with Travis Curtright (Ave Maria University) as editor-in-chief.

== History ==
The journal was established in 1963 under the auspices of Amici Thomae Mori, which had been founded in Brussels the previous year. The editor-in-chief for the first twenty-five years was Germain Marc'hadour (Université Catholique de l'Ouest). He was succeeded by Marie-Claire Phélippeau (Lycée Joffre).

== Abstracting and indexing ==
The journal is abstracted and indexed in:

- Annual Bibliography of English Language and Literature
- EBSCO databases
- Emerging Sources Citation Index
- Modern Language Association Database
- ProQuest databases
- Religious and Theological Abstracts
- Scopus

== See also ==
- Utopian Studies Society
