= Germain Marc'hadour =

French writer and scholar (1921–2022)

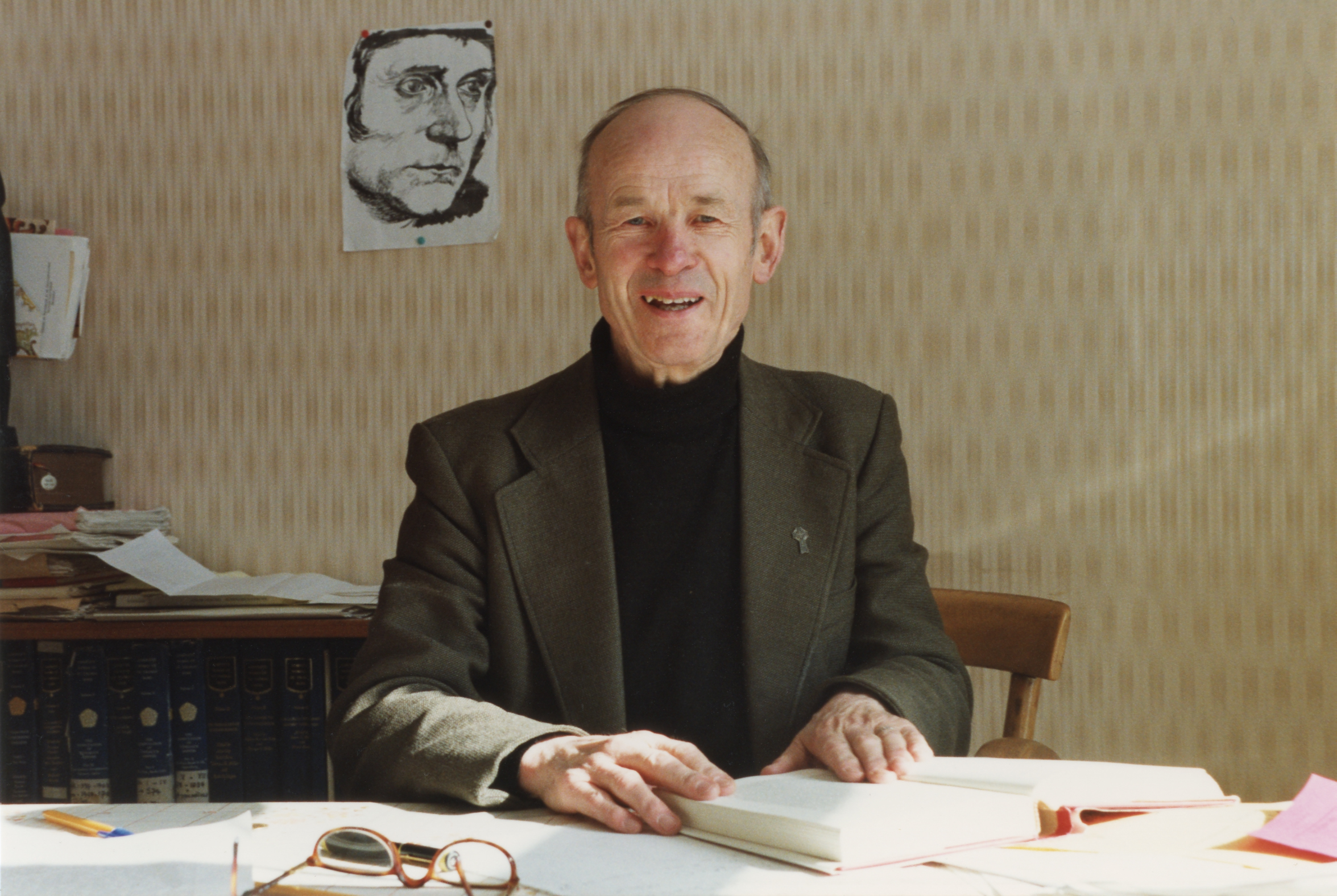
- Abbé Germain March'hadour in his study at the Moreanum, 29 rue Volney, Angers, France, 8 March 1990
- Born: 16 April 1921; Langonnet, Brittany, France
- Died: 22 February 2022 (aged 100); Sainte-Anne-d'Auray, Brittany, France
- Education: Université Catholique de l'Ouest; Paris-Sorbonne University
- Known for: Moreana (editor 1963-1988), The Bible in the Works of Thomas More (5 vols, 1969-1972)
- Awards: Ordre des Palmes Académiques
- Scientific career
- Fields: English Literature, Renaissance humanism
- Workplaces: Université Catholique de l'Ouest (Angers, France)

Germain Marc'hadour (16 April 1921 – 22 February 2022) was a French Catholic priest and a professor of English at the Université Catholique de l'Ouest in Angers. He was an internationally recognized authority on the life and work of Saint Sir Thomas More and the founder of the journal Moreana.

== Life and career ==
Marc'hadour was born in Langonnet, Brittany, the son of shopkeepers, and grew up bilingual in French and Breton. He studied English at the Université Catholique in Angers, and was ordained priest on 18 June 1944. After graduating from the Université Catholique he spent short periods of study at the University of Lyon and at University College, London, before beginning to teach in the English department at Angers in 1954. From 1959 he was associated with the Yale Edition of the Complete Works of St. Thomas More, a project based at Yale University.

On 1 July 1960, he attended the first night of A Man for All Seasons in London, publishing his first article about the play.

A Fulbright grant enabled Marc'hadour to spend fifteen months at Yale in 1960–1961, where he worked on the edition of the Supplication of Souls and consulted More holdings in Washington, San Marino, Los Angeles, San Francisco and Toronto. He returned to North America on a number of occasions throughout the 1960s, 1970s and 1980s as a researcher and as a lecturer, with stints at the Catholic University of America, Sherbrooke University, the University of Georgia, Auburn University and Rhode Island University.

On 29 December 1962, the international Association Amici Thomae Mori was founded in Brussels, Marc'hadour becoming the International Secretary in September 1963 and founding the journal Moreana.

In 1969, Marc'hadour obtained his doctorate from the Paris-Sorbonne University, with a dissertation on "Thomas More and the Bible". On the fifth centenary of More's birth, in 1977, he was invited to lecture at events in many different countries and on French television. He contributed the article on Thomas More to the fifteenth edition of the Encyclopædia Britannica

On 18 May 1988, he was created a knight of the Ordre des Palmes Académiques. In 1989 a Festschrift was published in his honour, Miscellanea Moreana: Essays for Germain Marc'hadour, edited by Clare M. Murphy and Henri Gibaud (Medieval and Renaissance texts and studies 61).

Marc'hadour died at the Maison Saint-Joachim in Sainte-Anne-d'Auray, Brittany, on 22 February 2022, at the age of 100. He was buried at Saint-Joachim's Cemetery on 25 February 2022.

== Bibliography ==
- Thomas More, Lettre à Dorp; La supplication des âmes, ed. and tr. Germain Marc'hadour. Soleil levant, Namur, 1962.
- L'Univers de Thomas More (1477–1535). Vrin, Paris, 1963. Volume 5 in the series "De Pétrarque à Descartes".
- Thomas More et la Bible: La place des livres saints dans son apologétique et sa spiritualité. Vrin, Paris, 1969.
- The Bible in the Works of Thomas More, 5 volumes. De Graaf, Nieuwkoop, 1969–1972.
- Thomas More ou La sage folie. Seghers, Paris, 1971.
- Essential Articles for the Study of Thomas More, ed. R. S. Sylvester and G. P. Marc'hadour. Archon books, Hamden (Conn.), 1977.
- Thomas More, A Dialogue Concerning Heresies, edited by Thomas M.C. Lawler, Germain Marc'hadour and Richard C. Marius. The Yale edition of the Complete Works of St. Thomas More, vol. 6. Yale University Press, New Haven and London, 1981.
- Correspondance entre Érasme de Rotterdam et Thomas More, tr. Germain Marc'hadour & Roland Galibois. Publications du Centre d'études de la Renaissance 10. Centre d'études de la Renaissance, Sherbrooke, Qué., 1985.
- Thomas More, The Supplication of Souls, in the Yale Edition of the Complete Works of St. Thomas More: Volume 7. 1990.
- Thomas More: un homme pour toutes les saisons. Les éditions ouvrières, Paris, 1992.
- Thomas More: Utopia. Didier Erudition, Paris, 1998.
- Thomas More, Dialogue du réconfort, translated by Germain Marc'hadour and Jocelyne Malhomme. Brepols, Turnhout, 2010.
