= Thomas North (disambiguation) =

Thomas North may refer to:

- Thomas North (1535–1604), English translator
- Thomas North (antiquary) (1830–1884), English antiquarian
- Thomas North (cricketer) (1858–1942), New Zealand cricketer
- Thomas North (coal owner) (1810-1868), English colliery entrepreneur
