= Sheriff of Nottingham (position) =

Office enforcing law and order in Nottingham

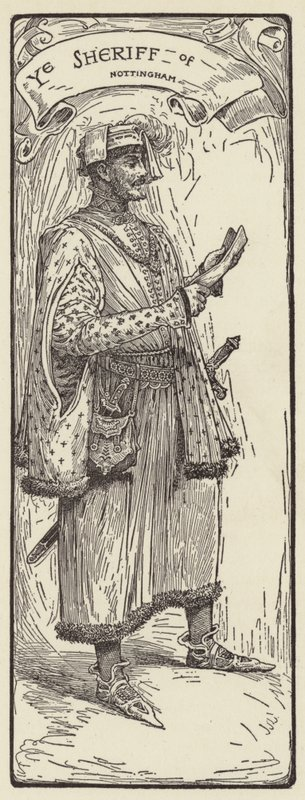
1912 illustration of the fictional Sheriff of Nottingham

The Sheriff of Nottingham was historically the office responsible for enforcing law and order in Nottingham and bringing criminals to justice. For years the post has been directly appointed by the Lord Mayor of Nottingham and in modern times, with the existence of the police force, the position is entirely ceremonial and sustained to boost tourism due to the legendary connection with the fictional Sheriff of Nottingham in the tales of Robin Hood. However, the historical position goes back to Anglo-Saxon times. The office is sometimes confused with that of the High Sheriff of Nottinghamshire (that office had previously existed, from 1068 until 1568, as Sheriff of Nottinghamshire, Derbyshire and the Royal Forests).

== History ==
Responsibility for enforcing the law and keeping the peace in Anglo-Saxon England fell to the sheriff or shire-reeve (which is a contraction of the Old English word for county and reeve or greave). Different types of reeves attested before the Conquest include the high-reeve, town-reeve, port-reeve, shire-reeve (predecessor to the sheriff), reeve of the hundred and the reeve in charge of a manor, its post-conquest meaning. England in the early 11th century employed the services of shire reeves to assist in the detection and prevention of crimes. Groups of 10 families or "tithings" under a hundredman (later constable) could call upon them. The reeve of an entire shire was a shire-reeve, predecessor to the sheriff.

After the Norman Conquest, specific counties appointed sheriffs to enforce the law (such as Yorkshire for example), although sometimes the duties of these sheriffs would cross the border of their respective counties. Nottingham would have come under the "High Sheriff of Nottinghamshire and Derbyshire" after the Norman Conquest.

The Sheriff during the reign of King John was Philip Marc. Marc was so unpopular that he was specifically mentioned in the Magna Carta, which demanded his removal.

=== The first Sheriffs of Nottingham ===
In 1449, the city of Nottingham itself appointed its own sheriff for the first time. However, the post was held simultaneously between two men, William Sadler and Thomas Lyng. The sheriffs at that time may have been responsible for "the delivery of prisoners to the courts, the collection of rents and taxes and generally keeping the 'King's Peace'".

The position of Sheriff of Nottingham began to become a key feature in the tales and legends of Robin Hood from the 14th century onwards. While the position in the tales was seen as fictional and as a caricature, it was indicative of the potential for power to abused and corrupted in the medieval period.

From 1450 until 1835, the office was shared between two people, one of whom may have been chosen by the Mayor, the other by the town council. The reversion to a single sheriff was explained by the mayor and aldermen of Lincoln as "Local Government changes" (possibly the Municipal Corporations Act 1835).

=== Past sheriffs ===
The office is considered largely ceremonial, expected to attend local events when the monarch is present and promoting the city in tourism and business. There are interviews with Joan Casson, John Hartshorne and Leon Unczur all recent sheriffs, describing the role of the present-day Sheriff of Nottingham. The first female sheriff was appointed in 1931.

== List of sheriffs ==
The following list is based on records from the Nottingham City Council Source

=== Present sheriff ===
Audrey Dinnall was elected Sheriff on May 15, 2026.

=== 15th century ===
- 1449/50 William Sadler / Thomas Lyng
- 1450/51 John Clarke / Richard Bedal
- 1451/52 John Jowett / John Chaloner
- 1452/53 Robert Polson / John Holyock
- 1453/54 Thomas Bradmore / Thomas Smith
- 1454/55 Thomas Lovatt / Robert Shewood
- 1455/56 John Peringon / Henry Fisher
- 1456/57 William Strelly / Richard Hanson
- 1457/58 Ralph Hall / Henry Higyn
- 1458/59 No known names
- 1460/61 Hugh Smith / Thomas Garner
- 1461/62 John Ody / John Hyne
- 1462/63 John Mapperley / Roger Hewson
- 1463/64 Richard Knight / Walter Hilton
- 1458/59 No known names
- 1465/66 Richard Ody / John Hardy
- 1466/67 Richard Burton / John Taverner
- 1467/68 John Cooke / John Draper
- 1468/69 Robert Hanson / William Bithway
- 1469/70 William Barnes / Thomas Woodhouse
- 1472/73 Thomas Kendal / Richard Mellor
- 1473/74 John Gotham / John Holyock
- 1475/76 John Hilton / William Skevyngton
- 1476/77 William Allyn / John Cowper
- 1477/78 Walter Watnall / William Hurst
- 1478/79 Robert Ratcliffe / John Wederley
- 1479/80 John Clarke / John Alred
- 1480/81 John Cost / John Wood
- 1481/82 Thomas Cost / Ralph Hill
- 1482/83 John Howitt / William Johnson
- 1483/84 John Mellor / John Burton
- 1484/85 Thomas Ball / Edward Hilton
- 1485/86 John Bolton / John Williamson
- 1486/87 John Turner / William Wright
- 1487/88 Edmund Milnes / John Sergeant
- 1488/89 Richard Pyckard / Richard Fisher
- 1489/90 Richard Essett / Thomas Balderby
- 1490/91 Thomas Watt / William Congerton
- 1491/92 Richard Clough / Thomas Clifton
- 1492/93 Thomas Williamson / William Shirley
- 1493/94 Robert Coytus / John Pyerson
- 1494/95 Robert Toft / John Webster
- 1495/96 John Shaw / Christopher Pickard
- 1496/97 John Cost / Alexander Elvington
- 1497/98 John Walton / Alexander Elvington
- 1498/99 Robert Norwood / Henry Hobbes
- 1499/1500 William Turner / William Benbow

=== 16th century ===
- 1500/01 Thomas Camworth / John Town
- 1501/02 John Wilkinson (mayor 1517) / John Fisher
- 1502/03 John Rose / Thomas Willoughby (mayor 1518)
- 1503/04 Henry Plumptre / Ranulph Bulkley
- 1504/05 Nicholas Rodes / James Brasenby
- 1505/06 William Kirkby (mayor 1523) / William Johnson
- 1506/07 Richard Caunt / Richard Halton
- 1507/08 John Hames / Thomas Stables
- 1507/09 Thomas the Curren
- 1508/09 William Cost / Thomas Wass
- 1509/10 William Hegyn / Thomas Mellers (mayor 1529)
- 1510/11 Thomas Cockayne / William Parmaton (mayor 1527, 1534)
- 1511/12 Robert Mellers / Thomas Morton
- 1512/13 Henry Cost / Robert Shemald
- 1513/14 Richard Lister / Robert Fisher
- 1514/15 John Doubleday / John Dorand
- 1515/16 John Yates / Richard Stanley
- 1516/17 Richard Selyoke / Thomas Hunt
- 1517/18 Robert Hesilrig (mayor 1539) / Henry Green
- 1518/19 Robert Rossel / Robert Stables
- 1519/20 John Alynson (mayor 1540) / Thomas Meryel
- 1520/21 William Holden / Hugh Oldham
- 1521/22 Thomas Dokker / Ralph Palmer
- 1522/23 Robert Lovatt / Robert Moody
- 1523/24 Thomas Hobbes / Robert Nedham
- 1524/25 William Warner / Thomas Harpham
- 1525/26 Henry Shepherd / William Sherpington
- 1526/27 William Colville / Robert Elton
- 1527/28 Thomas Gregory / Thomas Dawson (mayor 1547)
- 1528/29 Richard Richardson / Laurence Wirehorn
- 1529/30 James Mason / Robert Clattercoats
- 1530/31 Richard Willoughby / Anthony Garland
- 1531/32 William Clattercoats / Richard Nedham
- 1532/33 William Edmondson / Laurence Marriott
- 1533/34 William Mellers / Randell Bland
- 1534/35 Humphrey Quernby (mayor 1549) / William Coke
- 1535/36 Thomas Cockayne / John Smith
- 1536/37 Richard Bunting / John Collinson
- 1537/38 John Revell / Thomas Wallis
- 1538/39 Richard Kyte / John Newbold
- 1539/40 Robert Freeman / Christopher Stocks
- 1540/41 Richard Crewe / John Sladen
- 1541/42 Humphry Byrd / William Foster
- 1542/43 John Haskett / Nicholas Bonner (mayor 1559, 1565)
- 1543/44 Henry Wincell / Henry Fosbrooke (mayor 1560, 1566)
- 1544/45 Richard Alyson / Richard Burton
- 1545/46 John English / William Goodwin
- 1546/47 Robert Cockayne / Robert Stanley
- 1547/48 John Stanley / Edward Crewe
- 1548/49 John Simpson / John Presse
- 1549/50 Randolph Glossop / John Gregory (mayor 1561)
- 1550/51 John Nix / Nicholas Gorstan
- 1551/52 John Alcocke / John Brownley (mayor 1567)
- 1552/53 John Elton / Edward Newton
- 1553/54 John Collin / Walter Dawson
- 1554/55 Edward Edmundson / Richard Askew
- 1555/56 Francis Colman / William Gelstrop (mayor 1583, 1590)
- 1556/57 Hugh Smith / Mathew Hallam
- 1557/58 Peter Clarke (mayor 1591, 1597) / Robert Burton
- 1558/59 Henry Dand / Robert Alvey (mayor 1580, 1587, 1594)
- 1559/60 William Wilson / Thomas Clarke
- 1560/61 Richard James (mayor 1577) / Thomas Kettering
- 1561/62 Richard Welsh / James Rawlinson
- 1562/63 William Ball / Gilbert Scale
- 1563/64 Robert Jepson / John Parr
- 1564/65 Thomas Atkinson / George Rotherham
- 1565/66 Simon Wilson / Robert Marsh
- 1566/67 William Scott / Henry Sherwood
- 1567/68 James Hartley / John Townrow
- 1568/69 Thomas Barwell / Fabian Mellers
- 1569/70 Thomas Nix / William Glossop
- 1570/71 Thomas Cadman / William Stansal
- 1571/72 Robert Cowper / Richard Morhag (mayor 1596, 1603, 1610)
- 1572/73 William Dodgson / Roger Wood
- 1573/74 Michael Bell / Henry Brightmore
- 1574/75 Robert Phipps / William Parlby
- 1575/76 Nicholas Alvey / William Bell
- 1576/77 Edmund Burton / Thomas Donycliffe
- 1577/78 Humphrey Bonner (mayor 1600, 1607) / George Hutchinson
- 1578/79 George Widdowson / George Curzon
- 1579/80 Thomas Reeve / Richard Tomlinson
- 1580/81 Robert York / Simon Pyckard
- 1581/82 William Pyggin / Roger Wood
- 1582/83 William Greaves / Richard Hurt (mayor 1602)
- 1583/84 Robert Smales / Robert Hallam
- 1584/85 Thomas Huthwaite / Anker Jackson (mayor 1598, 1605, 1612)
- 1585/86 John Hall / Thomas Wallis
- 1586/87 Hezekiah Newbold / Henry Dunne
- 1587/88 John Nodin / Nicholas Sherwin
- 1588/89 Edward Goodwin / Robert Stables (mayor 1601, 1608)
- 1589/90 Richard Parleby / Ralph Shaw
- 1590/91 William Freeman (mayor 1606, 1613) / Nicholas Baguley
- 1591/92 Edmund Jowett / Leonard Nix (mayor 1617, 1624, 1631)
- 1592/93 Richard Johnson / Richard Welsh (mayor 1604, 1611)
- 1593/94 Thomas Drury / Richard Reckless
- 1594/95 James Martin / William Widdowson
- 1595/96 William Langford / William Wilson
- 1596/97 William Kniveton / George Stokely
- 1597/98 John Scott / William Pinder
- 1598/99 Francis Rolleston / Henry Alvey
- 1599/1600 James Hobson / Richard Parker

=== 17th century ===
- 1600/01 James Woolfe / John Parker
- 1601/02 Thomas Hill / Marmaduke Gregory (mayor 1620)
- 1602/03 Robert Sherwin / James Rotherham
- 1603/04 William Littlefare / William Hynde
- 1604/05 Thomas Nix (mayor 1616) / Robert Parker (mayor 1626, 1633)
- 1605/06 Robert Freeman / Anthony Gamble
- 1606/07 Richard Reckless / George Riley
- 1607/08 Thomas Morley / Richard Heald
- 1608/09 Nicholas Sherwin / John Dalton
- 1609/10 James Seeley / Richard Hare
- 1610/11 Lewis Oxley / Stephen Hill
- 1611/12 George Walker / Henry Baguley
- 1612/13 William Clark / Pervcival Millington
- 1613/14 Richard Jowett / John Alvey
- 1614/15 John Perry / William Ludlam
- 1615/16 William Ricket / William Hunt
- 1616/17 Samuel Burrows / William Hunt
- 1617/18 Michael Cook / Hugh Verden
- 1618/19 William Gregory / John James
- 1619/20 Nicholas Mastyn / William Nix
- 1620/21 Robert Briggs / Edward Morris
- 1621/22 Gabriel Bateman / Cuthbert Weyn
- 1622/23 William Parker / Roger Darbyshire
- 1623/24 William Hopkins / William Lupton
- 1624/25 Thomas Cook / William Littlefare Jnr.
- 1625/26 Richard Cowlishaw / John Dodsley
- 1626/27 William Stanley / Robert Egginton
- 1627/28 Alexander Staples / Robert Greaves
- 1628/29 Richard Hardmett (mayor 1635, 1642) / Robert Harris
- 1629/30 Edward Richards / John Poynton
- 1630/31 Richard Dring / William Frost
- 1631/32 Francis Toplady (mayor 1653, 1660) / Richard Hare
- 1632/33 Gabriel Groves / James Beardsley
- 1633/34 Edmund Bampton / William Watson
- 1635/36 William Richards / William Drury (mayor 1640)
- 1636/37 Thomas Wooley / Richard Turpin
- 1637/38 Thomas Malin / Henry Miller
- 1638/39 Joseph Winfield / Thomas Jackson
- 1639/40 Henry James / Thomas Gamble
- 1640/41 John Cooper / William Parker
- 1641/42 John Sherwin / William Sumner
- 1642/43 John Tomlin / George Alsebrooke
- 1643/44 Richard Hides / Paul Hooton
- 1644/45 Thomas Smith / William Bailey
- 1645/46 John Fillingham / Adrian Garner
- 1646/47 John Parker / Thomas Huthwaite
- 1647/48 Richard Whitby / William Riley
- 1648/49 Thomas Green / Robert Smith
- 1649/50 John Reckless / Richard Watkinson
- 1650/51 Joshuah Hill / William Hall
- 1651/52 Edmund Richards / Robert Malin
- 1652/53 Robert Saxon / Barnaby Wartnaby
- 1653/54 Thomas Cooper / Brownlow Eggington
- 1654/55 Daniel Sulley / Francis Cooke
- 1655/56 Roger Riley / Richard Smith
- 1656/57 Richard Crampton / John Smalley
- 1657/58 William Petty / William Lealand
- 1658/59 William Parker / John Toplady
- 1659/60 Isaac Malin / William Drury
- 1660/61 Samuel Riley / Adrian Cooke
- 1661/62 Richard Hodgkin / William Burton
- (superseded by Edward / Greaves)
- 1662/63 William Toplady / John Greaves
- 1663/64 Christopher Hall / Gervase Rippon
- 1664/65 Robert Bate / William Ashers
- 1665/66 William Sheppard / John Parker
- 1666/67 Thomas Walker / Roger Riley
- 1667/68 Robert Kirkby / John Rawson
- 1668/69 Joseph Clay / Edward White
- 1669/70 Gervase Wyld* / Samuel Richards*
- 1670/71 Benjamin Riccards / Ralph Bennet
- 1671/72 Arthur Riccards / William White
- 1672/73 Richard Smith / Robert Coulstone
- 1673/74 William Wilde / John Parker
- 1674/75 Samuel Smith / Francis Salmon
- 1675/76 Hugh Walker / Adrian Gamble
- 1676/77 Thomas Muxlow / Robert Wortley
- 1677/78 William Coulton / Harold Smyth
- 1678/79 William Hardy / Robert Hewitt
- 1679/80 William Woolhouse / Francis Sumners
- 1680/81 John Sherwin / Samuel Lealand
- 1681/82 Robert Green / John Malin
- 1682/83 Robert Peach / John Whitby
- 1683/84 John Peak / John Huthwaite
- 1684/85 Thomas Le / John Shipman
- 1685/86 William Jackson / John Unwin
- 1686/87 Henry Hardy / Thomas Partridge
- 1687/88 John Scattergood / Richard Wright
- 1688/89 Thomas Boote / Samuel Smith
- 1689/90 Samuel Watkinson / William Cockle
- 1690/91 William Orme / William Barnes
- 1691/92 James Huthwaite / Benjamin Green
- 1692/93 John Hoe / Edward Hickling
- 1693/94 Samuel Smith / Francis Armstrong
- 1694/95 John Kitchen / William Barke
- 1695/96 Roger Radford / Robert Lindley
- 1696/97 Robert Harrison / John Greaves
- 1697/98 Thomas James / Robert Allcock
- 1698/99 Thomas Lovett / John Riccards
- 1699/1700 Francis Metham / George Frith

=== 18th century ===
- 1700/01 Joseph Cooke / William Bilby
- 1701/02 Richard Bearn (mayor 1719, 1725) / Alexander Burden
- 1702/03 John Reynolds / John Collin
- 1703/04 William Greaves / Theodore Fosbrooke
- 1704/05 William Johnson / Thomas Hawkesley (mayor 1715)
- 1705/06 William Drury (mayor 1707)/ Robert Brentnall
- 1706/07 William Rippon / Francis Smith
- 1707/08 Lionel Lamb / Thomas White
- 1708/09 Jacob Tibson / Thomas Fillingham
- 1709/10 Alvery Dodsley / Matthew Hoyland
- 1710/11 Robert Hoyes / Thomas Trigge (mayor 1717, 1723)
- 1711/12 John Sherwin / John Sweetapple
- 1712/13 Gervase Pilkinton / Joseph Hemus
- 1713/14 John Huthwaite (mayor 1732) / Bartholomew Hallam
- 1714/15 Marmaduke Pennell (mayor 1718, 1724) / William Trigge (mayor 1730, 1748)
- 1715/16 John Newton / William Shepherd
- 1716/17 Robert Egginton / Laurence Bourne
- 1717/18 John Radforth / Joseph Walters
- 1718/19 Jonathon Truman / Richard Smith
- 1719/20 William Garton / Samuel Poe
- 1720/21 William Robinson / Edmund Wildbore
- 1721/22 John Burton / Robert Egginton
- 1722/23 James Hoe / James Huthwaite
- 1723/24 Nathaniel Charnels / John Hornbuckle (1743, 1749, 1754)
- 1724/25 Samuel Harris / John Poe
- 1725/26 John Morley / William Bilbie Jnr.
- 1726/27 Richard Wheldon / Roger Radforth
- 1727/28 John Farnhill / Joseph Inglesant
- 1728/29 Jonathon Truman Jnr. / Henry Butler
- 1729/30 John Wood / Samuel Fellows
- 1730/31 Stephen Egginton / Cornelius Huthwaite (mayor 1757, 1763, 1771)
- 1731/32 John Foxcroft / John Bilbie
- 1732/33 Thomas Langford (mayor 1733, 1747, 1753, 1759)/ Lewis Sherwin
- 1733/34 Isaac Wyld (mayor 1759) / Joseph Finch
- 1734/35 Francis Parkin / Joseph Smith
- 1735/36 Joseph Wright / Joseph Bilbie
- 1736/37 James Dymock / Robert Huish (mayor 1760)
- 1737/38 Charles Morley / James Hornbuckle (mayor 1761, 1767)
- 1738/39 Thomas Shaw / Joseph Wright
- 1739/40 Humphrey Hollins (mayor 1762) / Samuel Wood
- 1740/41 William Cooper (mayor 1765) / John Sherbrooke
- 1741/42 Alexander Burden / Benjamin Bull
- 1742/43 James Huthwaite Jnr. / Robie Swann (mayor 1766)
- 1743/44 William Goodwin / William Foulds
- 1744/45 John Killingley / Thomas Haywood
- 1745/46 John Oldknow / John Sands
- 1746/47 Thomas Cotes / Thomas Oldknow
- 1747/48 John Plumptre / William Cotton
- 1748/49 John Egginton / Humphrey Cox
- 1749/50 Benjamin Mather / Richard Butler
- 1750/51 Johnathon Dodson / William Seagrave
- 1751/52 Thomas Worthington / John Caruthers
- 1752/53 John Blackwell / Thomas Spilby
- 1753/54 John Fellows / Thomas Sands
- 1754/55 William Huthwaite / Robert Seagrave
- 1755/56 John Mellie / John Inglesant
- 1756/57 Mark Huish / Alexander Foxcroft
- 1757/58 John Wilson / Robert Foulds
- 1758/59 Robert Hall / John Wells
- 1759/60 John Foxcroft / Joseph Stubbins
- 1760/61 James Foxcroft / George Dodson
- 1761/62 John Padley / William Howitt
- 1762/63 Benjamin Foxcroft / Matthew Whitlock
- 1763/64 Isaac Wylde / Joseph Lowe
- 1764/65 Benjamin Hornbuckle / John Sands
- 1765/66 William Bettison / Benjamin Mather
- 1766/67 John Doncaster / William Smith
- 1767/68 Henry Hollins / George Sands
- 1768/69 Thomas Oldknow Jnr. / Michael Kayes
- 1769/70 Joseph Heath / Joseph Oldknow
- 1770/71 Samuel Eaton / John Oldknow
- 1771/72 William Wells / Henry Green
- 1772/73 John Wells / Richard Cox
- 1773/74 George Burbage / John Collishaw
- 1774/75 Ralph Newman / William Heath
- 1775/76 Edward Chatteris / Samuel Newham
- 1776/77 Smith Churchill / Tertius Dale
- 1777/78 Sir George Smith, Bt / Samuel Statham
- 1778/79 Samuel Heywood / Robert Summers
- 1779/80 Samuel Worthington / Samuel Green
- 1780/81 John Buxton / John Ball Mason
- 1781/82 John Fellows (mayor 1790) / John Hancock
- 1782/83 Thomas Caunt (mayor 1794) / Thomas Watson
- 1783/84 Henry Keyworth / John Need
- 1784/85 Edward Swann / Alexander Strahan
- 1785/86 John Heath / George Dodson Jnr.
- 1786/87 Stokeham Huthwaite / Thomas Hawkesley
- 1787/88 John Davison / Thomas Nelson
- 1788/89 Timothy Fellows / William Huthwaite Jnr.
- 1789/90 Joseph Hurst Lowe / Joseph Heath
- 1790/91 John Whitlock / Ehlm Samuel Fellows
- 1791/92 William Doncaster / John Stone
- 1792/93 Thomas Wylde / Thomas Pepper
- 1793/94 Nathaniel Whitlock / Thomas Smith
- 1794/95 Thomas Richards / Henry Green Jnr.
- 1795/96 John Allen / John Ashwell
- 1796/97 Thomas Richards / Nathaniel Need Jnr.
- 1797/98 Cornelius Huthwaite / William Dawson
- 1798/99 Wright Coldhan / William Wilson
- 1799/1800 Robert Hall / Jonathan Dunn

=== 19th century ===
- 1800/01 George Nelson / Henry Enfield
- 1801/02 John Allen / Thomas White
- 1802/03 William Howitt (mayor 1808) / William Hickling
- 1803/04 George Nelson / Thomas Williams
- 1804/05 Charles Lomas Morley (mayor 1815, 1821) / John Houseman Barber (mayor 1817)
- 1805/06 Charles Mellor / Edward Stavely
- 1806/07 Octavius Thomas Oldknow (mayor 1822)/ Alexander Strahan
- 1807/08 John Bates / Wright Coldham (mayor 1809)
- 1808/09 John Carr / Francis Wakefield Jnr.
- 1809/10 Kirk Swann / William Morley
- 1810/11 Charles Wakefield / John Stevens Howitt
- 1811/12 Isaac Woolley (mayor 1818)/ Samuel Hall
- 1812/13 Edward Allatt Swann / Alfred Joseph Lowe
- 1813/14 Charles Lomas Morley / John Michael Fellows
- 1814/15 John Allen Jnr. / William Soars (mayor 1819)
- 1815/16 Richard Hopper Jnr. / Thomas Wakefield
- 1816/17 George Gill / Roger Allen
- 1817/18 A.T. Fellows / C. Huish
- 1818/19 N. Barnsdall / John Theaker
- 1819/20 C. Huish / Deverills
- 1820/21 Robert Seals / J. Heard
- 1821/22 J. Heard / W. Rowarth
- 1822/23 J. Wells / T. Wilson
- 1823/24 Henry Leaver / Thomas Guildford
- 1824/25 F. Hart / James Fellows
- 1825/26 William Walker / S. H. Swann
- 1821/22 J. Heard / W. Rowarth
- 1822/23 J. Wells / T. Wilson
- 1823/24 Henry Leaver / Thomas Guildford
- 1824/25 F. Hart / James Fellows
- 1825/26 William Walker / S. H. Swann
- 1826/27 William Enfield / Thomas Shipman
- 1827/28 Samuel Hollins / Kirke Swann
- 1828/29 Nathaniel Barnsdall / Henry Homer
- 1829/30 William Cartledge / R. Davison
- 1830/31 T. Allen / R. C. Barber
- 1831/32 John Harrison / T. Guildford
- 1832/33 George Harvey / John Rogers
- 1833/34 Thomas Roberts / T. Bishop
- 1834/35 Charles Leavers / John Birkhead
- 1835/36 Henry Moses Wood
- 1836/37 George Bacon
- 1837/38 Benjamin Morley
- 1838/39 Francis Butcher Gill
- 1839/40 Johnathon Neville
- 1840/41 Thomas Roberts Jnr.
- 1841/42 Thomas Gilbert Carver (mayor 1848)
- 1842/43 Jonathon Reckless (mayor 1853)
- 1843/44 William Galloway
- 1844/45 William Knight
- 1845/46 Nathan Hurst Jnr.
- 1846/47 John Barber
- 1847/48 James Roe
- 1848/49 Edward Steegman
- 1849/50 Thomas Ashwell
- 1850/51 S. Wilmot
- 1851/52 T. Ball
- 1852/53 W. Page
- 1853/54 Anthony John Mundella
- 1854/55 W. V. Copeland
- 1855/56 F. E. Shipley
- 1856/57 C. Felkin
- 1857/58 W. Bradbury
- 1858/59 John Manning (mayor 1870)
- 1859/60 William G. Ward (mayor 1871)
- 1860/61 William Lambert (mayor 1874)
- 1865/66 R. B. Bond
- 1866/67 M. I. Preston
- 1867/68 G. C. Hill
- 1868/69 G. C. Hill
- 1869/70 John W. Bowers (mayor 1876)
- 1870/71 J. G. Woodward
- 1871/72 C. A. Boot
- 1872/73 G. Trevitt
- 1873/74 James Carver
- 1874/75 William Sulley
- 1875/76 John Renals (mayor 1888)
- 1876/77 Leonard Lindley (mayor 1882)
- 1877/78 Alfred J.Jacoby
- 1878/79 John Turney (mayor 1886/87)
- 1879/80 Frederick Acton
- 1880/81 H. S. Cropper
- 1881/82 T. Bayley
- 1882/83 J. P. Ford
- 1883/84 F. F. Cleaver
- 1884/85 Edward Henry Fraser (mayor 1896/97)
- 1885/86 John Benjamin Walker
- 1886/87 Robert Dennett
- 1887/88 John Jelly
- 1888/89 John Robinson
- 1889/90 Frederick Pullman
- 1890/91 Anderson Brownsword
- 1891/92 John Alfred H. Green (mayor 1906)
- 1892/93 Abraham Pyatt
- 1893/94 Joseph Bright (mayor 1894/95, 1904)
- 1894/95 Forbes R. Mutch
- 1895/96 John Bright
- 1896/97 Frederick R. Radford
- 1897/98 Arthur William Black
- 1898/99 Frederick W. Gregory
- 1899/1900 James Black Roberts

=== 20th century ===
- 1900/01 James Brown Sim
- 1901/02 Edward G. Loverseed
- 1902/03 John White
- 1903/04 Robert Fleeman
- 1904/05 Thomas James Dabell
- 1905/06 Samborne Cook
- 1906/07 Frederick Ball
- 1907/08 William Henry Carey
- 1908/09 Edwin Mellor
- 1909/10 Thomas Ward
- 1910/11 Frank Newton Hobson/ Albert Reuben Atkey (Lord Mayor 1928)
- 1911/12 John Pycroft
- 1912/13 Harry Baker Halford
- 1913/14 John Henry Gregg
- 1914/15 John Godfrey Small
- 1915/16 James Clarkson
- 1916/17 Richard Henry Swain
- 1917/18 Henry Offiler
- 1918/19 John Morris
- 1919/20 Herbert Offiler
- 1920/21 John H. Freckingham
- 1921/22 Abraham Parkes
- 1922/23 John Farr (Lord Mayor 1933)
- 1923/24 Arthur Judd
- 1924/25 Robert A. Young
- 1925/26 Samuel Geo. Ward
- 1926/27 John Hopkin
- 1927/28 Arthur Pollard (Lord Mayor 1930)
- 1928/29 William Green (Lord Mayor 1931)
- 1929/30 William Hooley (Lord Mayor 1937)
- 1930/31 Richard E. Ashworth (Lord Mayor 1934)
- 1931/32 C. M. Harper
- 1932/33 William Walter Weldon
- 1933/34 Ernest Purser (Lord Mayor 1936)
- 1934/35 Wallis Smith
- 1935/36 Frederick Mitchell (Lord Mayor 1943)
- 1936/37 Arthur E. Savage
- 1937/38 Walter Halls (Lord Mayor 1940)
- 1938/39 Louis Pilsworth (Lord Mayor 1941)
- 1939/40 Ernest A. Braddock (Lord Mayor 1942)
- 1940/41 Lazarus J. Levin
- 1941/42 A. H. Billingham
- 1942/43 John E. Mitchell (Lord Mayor 1947/48)
- 1943/44 Francis Carney (Lord Mayor 1944)
- 1944/45 Wilfred B. Blandy
- 1945/46 Thomas R. Scott
- 1946/47 Harry O. Emmony (Lord Mayor 1950)
- 1947/48 William Sharp (Lord Mayor 1949)
- 1948/49 William Sharp
- 1949 Joseph Littlefair (Died)
- 1949/50 Leon Willson (Lord Mayor 1952)
- 1950/51 Walter Murby
- 1951/52 Sidney Hobson (Lord Mayor 1954)
- 1952/53 John W. Kenyon (Lord Mayor 1959)
- 1953/54 William J. Cox (Lord Mayor 1956)
- 1954/55 Leonard Mitson (Lord Mayor 1955)
- 1955/56 William E. Maltby
- 1956/57 Roland E. Green (Lord Mayor 1960)
- 1957/58 John L. Davies (Lord Mayor 1961)
- 1958/59 Frank W. Wootton (Lord Mayor 1964)
- 1959/60 Sidney P. Hill (Lord Mayor 1962)
- 1960/61 Cornelius Cameron (Lord Mayor 1963)
- 1961/62 A. E. Greenaway
- 1962/63 Arthur William Norwebb
- 1963/64 Percy Holland (Lord Mayor 1966)
- 1964/65 William George Ernest Dyer (Lord Mayor 1969)
- 1965/66 Cornelius McNeil Reed
- 1966/67 E. M. Durham
- 1967/68 J. H. Bryan
- 1956/69 B. W. Goddard
- 1969/70 L. Whitehouse
- 1970/71 C. W. Judge
- 1971/72 Edwin Bernard Bateman (Lord Mayor 1977)
- 1972/73 Norman Hemmington
- 1973/74 Arthur G. Wright (Lord Mayor 1983)
- 1974/75 L. F. Squires
- 1975/76 G. H. Elliott
- 1976/77 G. Roberts
- 1977/78 Rex Rolling
- 1978/79 Percy Holland
- 1979/80 George Howe
- 1980/81 Frank Dennett
- 1981/82 Frank Dennett
- 1982/83 Frank Dennett
- 1983/84 Frank Dennett
- 1984/85 Frank Dennett
- 1985/86 Frank Dennett
- 1986/87 Barrie Parker (Lord Mayor 1996)
- 1987/88 Royce Young
- 1988/89 B. A. Marshall
- 1989/90 A. F. Robinson
- 1990/91 Alfred T. Stone
- 1991/92 Shaukat Khan
- 1992/93 Brent Charlesworth (Lord Mayor 2003)
- 1993/94 A. F. Robinson
- 1994/95 R. McIntosh
- 1995/96 Roy Greensmith (Lord Mayor 1997, 2001)
- 1996/97 Malcolm A. Wood (Lord Mayor 1992)
- 1996/97 S. Briggs
- 1997/98 A. F. Robinson
- 1998/99 Christopher Gibson (Lord Mayor 1990)
- 1999/2000 Mike Whittall

=== 21st century ===
- 2000/01 John Hartshorne (Lord Mayor 2004)
- 2001/02 Joan Casson
- 2002/03 Ali Asghar
- 2003/04 John Hartshorne
- 2004/05 Derek Creswell
- 2005/06 Derek Creswell
- 2006/07 Jeannie Packer (Lord Mayor 2009)
- 2007/08 Jeannie Packer
- 2008/09 Brian Grocock (Lord Mayor 2010)
- 2009/10 Leon Unczur (Lord Mayor 2012)
- 2010/11 Penny Griggs
- 2011/12 Merlita Bryan (Lord Mayor 2013)
- 2013/14 Ian Malcolm (Lord Mayor 2014)
- 2014/15 Jackie Morris (Lord Mayor 2015)
- 2015/16 Mohammed Saghir
- 2016/17 Jackie Morris
- 2017/18 Glyn Jenkins
- 2018/19 Catharine Arnold
- 2019/20 Patience Uloma Ifediora
- 2019/21 Patience Uloma Ifediora
- 2021/22 Merlita Bryan
- 2022/23 Nicola Heaton
- 2023/24 Shuguftah Quddoos
- 2024/25 Liaqat Ali
- 2025/26 Zafran Khan
- 2026/27 Audrey Dinnall
