= Christ Church, Cinderhill =

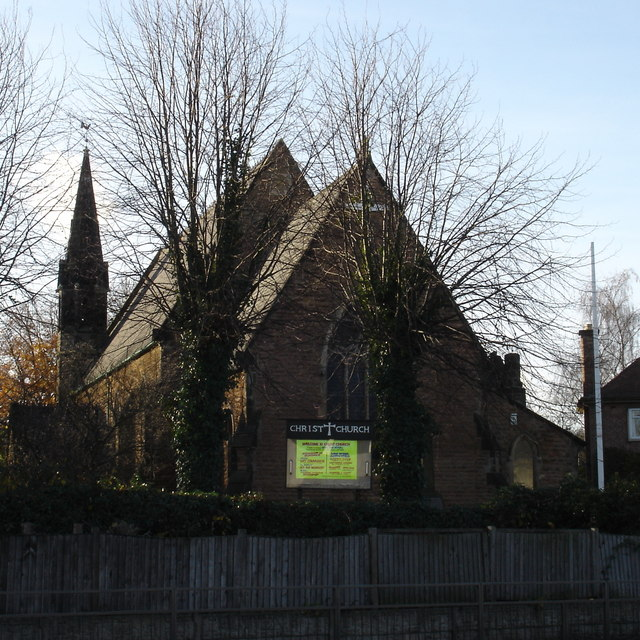
- Christ Church, Cinderhill
- Christ Church, Cinderhill
- 52°59′1.01″N 1°11′52.86″W
- OS grid reference: SK 53996 43216
- Location: Nottingham
- Country: England
- Denomination: Church of England

History
- Dedication: Christ Church

Architecture
- Heritage designation: Grade II listed
- Architect: Thomas Chambers Hine
- Style: Gothic Revival
- Completed: 1856
- Construction cost: £2,306

Administration
- Diocese: Southwell and Nottingham
- Archdeaconry: Nottingham
- Deanery: Nottingham North
- Parish: Cinderhill

Christ Church, Cinderhill is a Grade II listed parish church in the Church of England in Cinderhill, Nottingham.

== History ==
The church dates from 1856 and was constructed as a chapel of ease to St. Leodegarius Church, Basford. It was consecrated on 19 June 1856 by Rt. Revd. John Jackson, Bishop of Lincoln. The choir vestry was added in 1902.

The church was built for the local miners of Thomas North’s Babbington Colliery. Thomas Chambers Hine designed the church. The first chaplains were appointed when Cinderhill become a separate District in 1896. In 1929 Christ Church, Cinderhill's official name was changed to ‘The District Chapelry of Christ Church Cinderhill’. The Bishop of Southwell was the Patron.

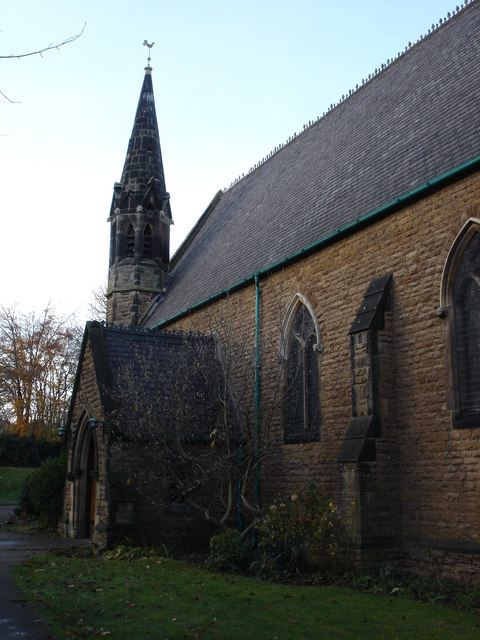
Spire of Christ Church, Cinderhill
