= Brent Charlesworth =

UK local politician

808th Mayor of Lincoln
- In office 3 May 2014 – 19 May 2015
- Preceded by: Patrick J. Vaughan
- Succeeded by: Andrew Kerry

Personal details
- Born: 22 July 1942 (age 83) Sheffield, Yorkshire, England
- Children: 1
- Education: Abbeydale Boys’ Grammar School
- Alma mater: University of Wales (B.A.); University of Leicester

Brent Charlesworth (born 22 July 1942) is a British local councillor who has served as Lord Mayor and Sheriff of Nottingham, and later as Mayor of Lincoln.

== Biography ==
Born in Sheffield on the 22nd of July, 1942 to Ronald and Sarah Charlesworth, Brent grew up on the Shirecliffe estate in Sheffield. His father worked 45 years in the steelworks in Templeborough (Rotherham) until the steel industry was wiped out during the Thatcher years.

Educated at Nether Edge (which became) Abbeydale Boys’ Grammar School, he trained as a teacher in Birmingham and taught in that city in the 1960s. Later he studied for a BA at the University of Wales, subsequently becoming a part-time university tutor. He also studied at the University of Leicester for a higher degree.

He moved to Nottingham in 1971, becoming a Lecturer in Education at the former Trent Polytechnic (now Nottingham Trent University). He became Senior Lecturer in the Social Studies Department, working on the Clifton Campus from 1976 until taking early retirement some 25 years later.

=== Political career ===
In 1983 he was elected to Nottingham City Council as Labour member for the Clifton West ward. After boundary changes abolished the Clifton West ward in 2003, when the City Council became a unitary authority, he was elected member for the newly created Clifton South ward. As a Nottingham City councillor, he held various positions of responsibility, latterly Vice-Chair of the Notts/Nottingham Fire and Rescue Service. Around 2000, he served as Chair of Governors for Whitegate Primary and Nursery School in Nottingham.

He served as the Lord Mayor of Nottingham in 2003/04, and was Sheriff of Nottingham for two years from 1991. Whilst serving the latter civic office, he travelled to the United States to present Hollywood actor Kevin Costner with an award recognising the achievements of the film Robin Hood: Prince of Thieves, in which Costner played the lead role and, when he was Lord Mayor, opened the Ningbo campus of the University of Nottingham in China.

He stood down from Nottingham City Council in May 2007, moved to Lincoln, ostensibly to retire, but was subsequently voted in as councillor for Park Ward on Lincoln City Council.

When Labour recovered power in Lincoln in 2011, he was appointed Executive Portfolio Holder for Social Inclusion and Community Cohesion, a post he held until taking civic office on 3 June 2014 as the 808th Mayor of Lincoln. In this role, he signed a twinning agreement with the city of Nanchang, China at the Lincoln Guildhall. He chose his Park Ward councillor colleague David Jackson as his Sheriff. His term came to an end on 19 May 2015.

He has described himself as a socialist, and expressed opposition to identity politics.

== Personal life ==
He has one son, Daniel, who graduated in Psychology from the University of Lincoln. He currently lives in Lincoln.

Originally a Sheffield Wednesday supporter, he attends every Imps (Lincoln City FC) home match.
