= Listed buildings in Kimberley, Nottinghamshire =

Kimberley is a civil parish in the Borough of Broxtowe, Nottinghamshire, England. The parish contains five listed buildings that are recorded in the National Heritage List for England. All the listed buildings are designated at Grade II, the lowest of the three grades, which is applied to "buildings of national importance and special interest". The parish contains the town of Kimberley, and the listed buildings consist of a farmhouse, the former maltings of a brewery, a cemetery chapel, a war memorial and a water tower.

== Buildings ==
Name and location	Photograph	Date	Notes
Manor Farmhouse; 52.99480°N 1.25706°W		Early 17th century	The farmhouse and adjoining cottage have a timber framed core on a stone plinth, they were mainly encased in brick and stone in the late 18th century, and have roofs of tile and pantile with one coped gable. There are two storeys, nine unequal bays, and a rear wing with exposed timber framing. The doorway has a fanlight, most of the windows are casements, most with segmental heads, and there are also horizontally-sliding sashes.
The Maltings; 53.00069°N 1.26035°W		1861	The maltings of the former Hardy and Hanson Brewery have been converted for residential use. The building is in brick with slate roofs. There were four kilns, each occupying two bays, each bay separated by a pilaster, and there are three storeys.
Cemetery chapel 52.99473°N 1.25282°W		1883	The chapel on a hilltop in Kimberley Cemetery was designed by R. C. Sutton. It is built in gritstone and has a tile roof with decorative pierced ridge tiles. The chapel has a bellcote on the north gable, an apse at the south end, and east and west porches. Most of the windows are lancets, and in the west gable apex is a circular window. The east porch is gabled and contains a doorway with a pointed arch, a moulded surround, short polished granite shafts with foliage capitals, and a hood mould.
War Memorial; 52.99682°N 1.25505°W		1921	The war memorial is in colourwashed reconstituted stone, and consists of a rotunda with a dome. It has a round plinth on which are six Doric columns carrying a moulded inscribed cornice band. On the dome is a square lantern with four clock faces and a flame finial. Inside the memorial is a hexagonal pier with a doorway, and three bronze tablets with inscriptions relating to both World Wars.
Swingate Water Tower, steps and balustrading 52.98970°N 1.25683°W		1950	The water tower is in reinforced concrete on a steel frame, with dressings in artificial stone, and is in Neoclassical style. The tower is on a plinth, and at the top is the water tank, which measures 30 feet (9.1 m) by 30 feet (9.1 m). At the junction is a cornice with dentil motifs. In the plinth is a doorway with a moulded surround, above it is a coat of arms in relief with a bracketed canopy, and a tall narrow multi-paned window. Flanking the tower are pairs of steps flanked by solid balustrades ending in broad circular piers.
