= Kimberley, Nottinghamshire =

Coordinates: 52.997°N 1.255°W

Kimberley
- Town and civil parish
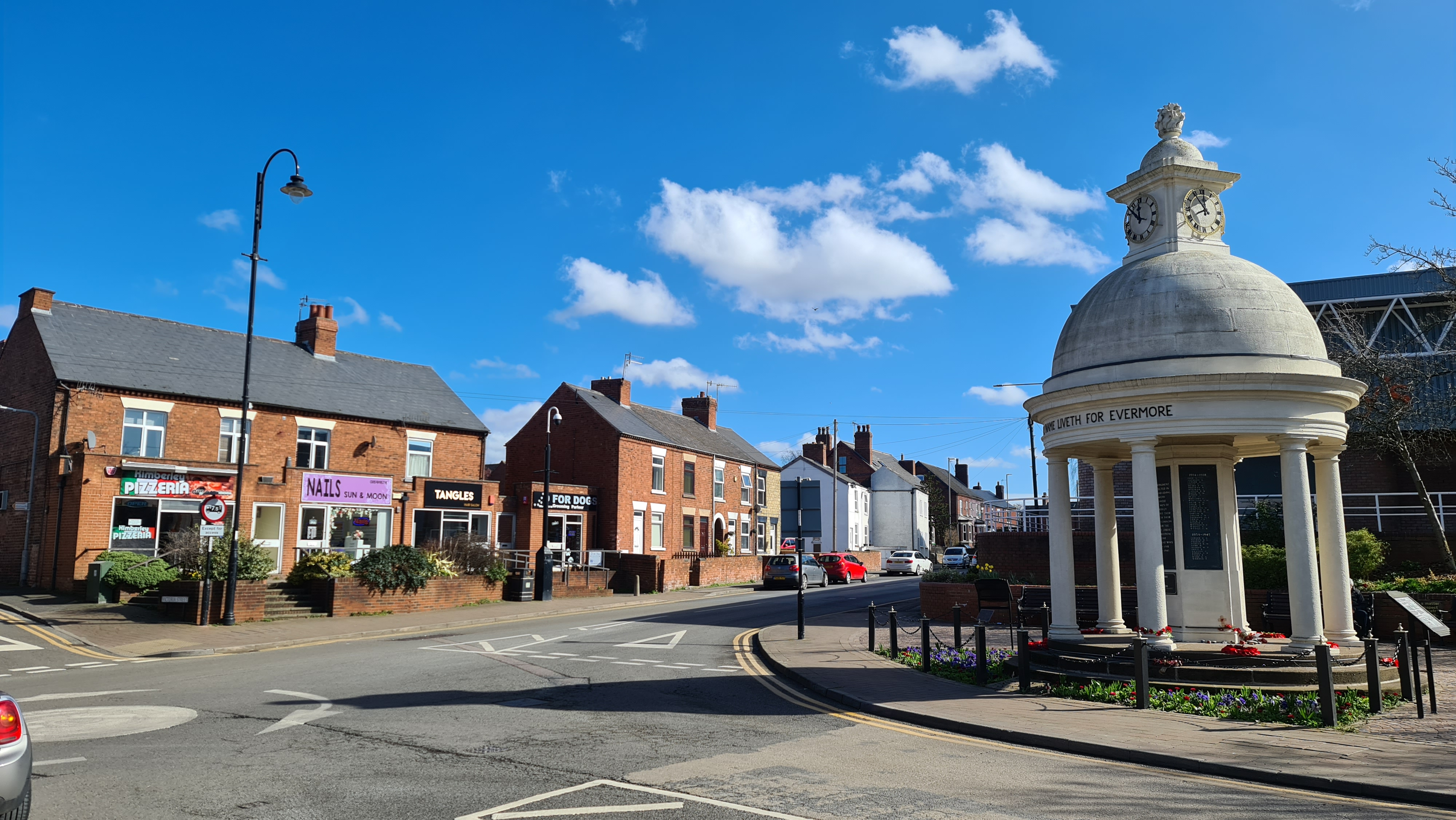
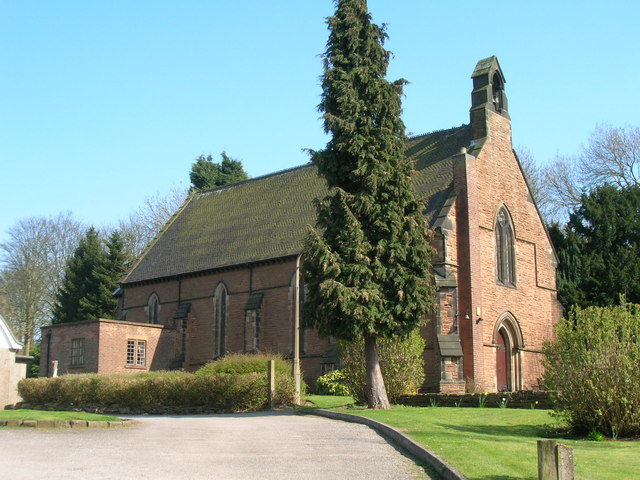
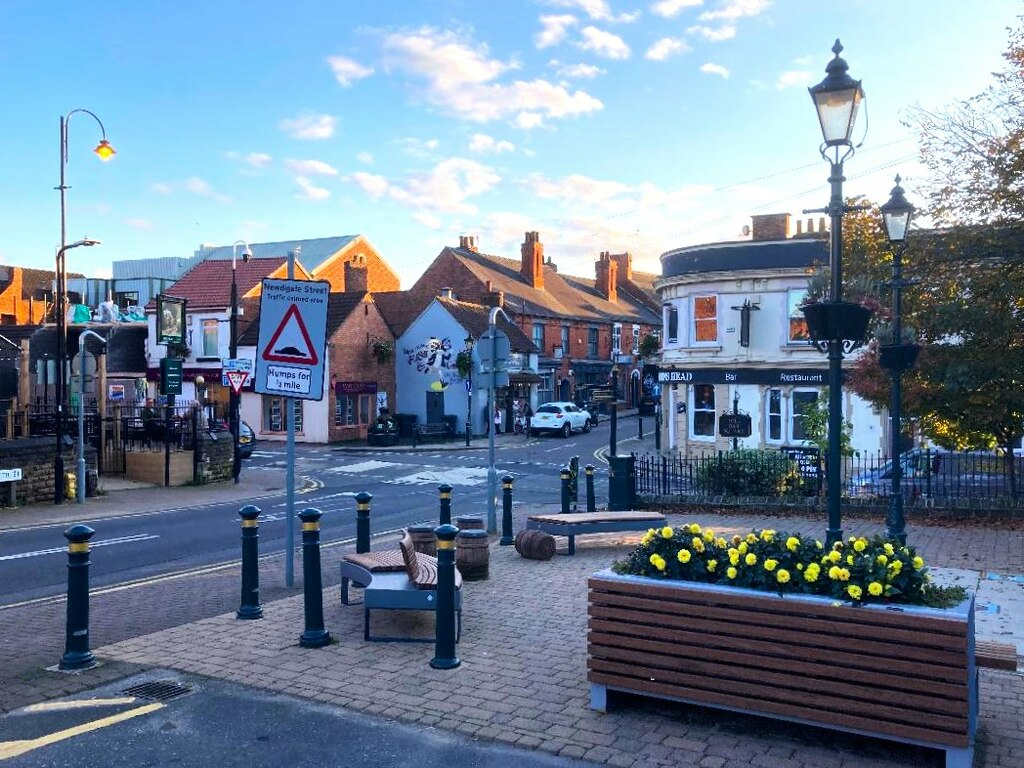
- War Memorial Holy Trinity Church Town Centre

- Location within Nottinghamshire
- Interactive map of Kimberley
- Area: 1.11 sq mi (2.9 km^{2})
- Population: 6,033 (2021)
  - Density: 5,435/sq mi (2,098/km^{2})
- OS grid reference: SK 49995 44702
  - London: 110 mi (180 km) SSE
- District: Borough of Broxtowe
- Shire county: Nottinghamshire
- Region: East Midlands
- Country: England
- Sovereign state: United Kingdom
- Areas of the town: List: Civil parish: Town centre, Babbington, Swingate; External suburbs: Giltbrook, Nuthall, Watnall
- Post town: Nottingham
- Postcode district: NG16
- Dialling code: 0115
- Police: Nottinghamshire
- Fire: Nottinghamshire
- Ambulance: East Midlands
- UK Parliament: Nottingham North and Kimberley
- Website: www.kimberley-tc.gov.uk

Kimberley is a market town and civil parish in the Borough of Broxtowe in Nottinghamshire, England, lying 6 miles (10 km) northwest of Nottingham along the A610.

== History ==
The name Kimberley derives from the Old English Cynemǣrlēah meaning 'Cynemǣr's wood or clearing'.

Kimberley is referred to as Chinemarelie in William the Conqueror's Domesday Book. With the accession of William to the throne Kimberley came into the possession of William de Peveril. The Peverils lost control when they supported the losing side in the civil war which preceded the accession of Henry II of England in 1154. The King became the owner of the land. King John of England granted land in the area to Ralph de Greasley in 1212 who took up residence at Greasley Castle and also at around this time to Henry de Grey whose son re-built Codnor Castle on the site of an earlier castle established by William Peveril.

Ralph de Greasley's land passed by inheritance and marriage to Nicholas de Cantelupe who took part in Edward III of England's Scottish campaigns and also the Battle of Crécy. Nicholas founded Beauvale Priory using part of his Kimberley holding in 1343. That part of Kimberley which had become the property of Beauvale Priory was claimed by King Henry VIII during the Dissolution of the Monasteries in the 16th century.

The Priory's land was redistributed by the King and came into the possession of Arthur Capell, 1st Baron Capell of Hadham again by inheritance and marriage in 1627. Arthur was beheaded in 1649 having fought for the Royalists in the English Civil War. Arthur's son was created Earl of Essex in 1661.

In 1753 the land was purchased by Sir Matthew Lamb whose grandson William Lamb became Prime Minister in 1834. The Lamb's Kimberley estates passed by marriage to the 5th Earl Cowper in 1805 and on the death of the 7th Earl in 1913 were sold off in pieces.

That part of Kimberley retained by the Cantelupe's passed by inheritance and marriage to John Lord Zouch who died at the Battle of Bosworth with Richard III in 1485. He was posthumously found guilty of high treason with his property forfeited to Henry VII. John Savage (-1491) received this part of Kimberley in gratitude for his efforts on behalf of Henry VII at Bosworth. The Savage family sold this land to the Earl of Rutland in the early 17th century. The Duke of Rutland's Kimberley estates were sold in parcels in the early 19th century.

=== Industrial Revolution ===
The town grew as a centre for coal mining, brewing and hosiery manufacturing. The parish had a population 6,033 at the 2021 census. Kimberley has been home to a lot of industry including: coal mining, brewing and hosiery manufacturing.

All major industry in Kimberley has stopped, the last being Kimberley Brewery which was taken over by Greene King in 2006, another major brewer in a multimillion-pound deal. This marked the end of the traditional Kimberley Ales as ale brewing ceased shortly afterwards and only a distribution centre remained there.

Most businesses are now retail-based concerns.

== Kimberley today ==
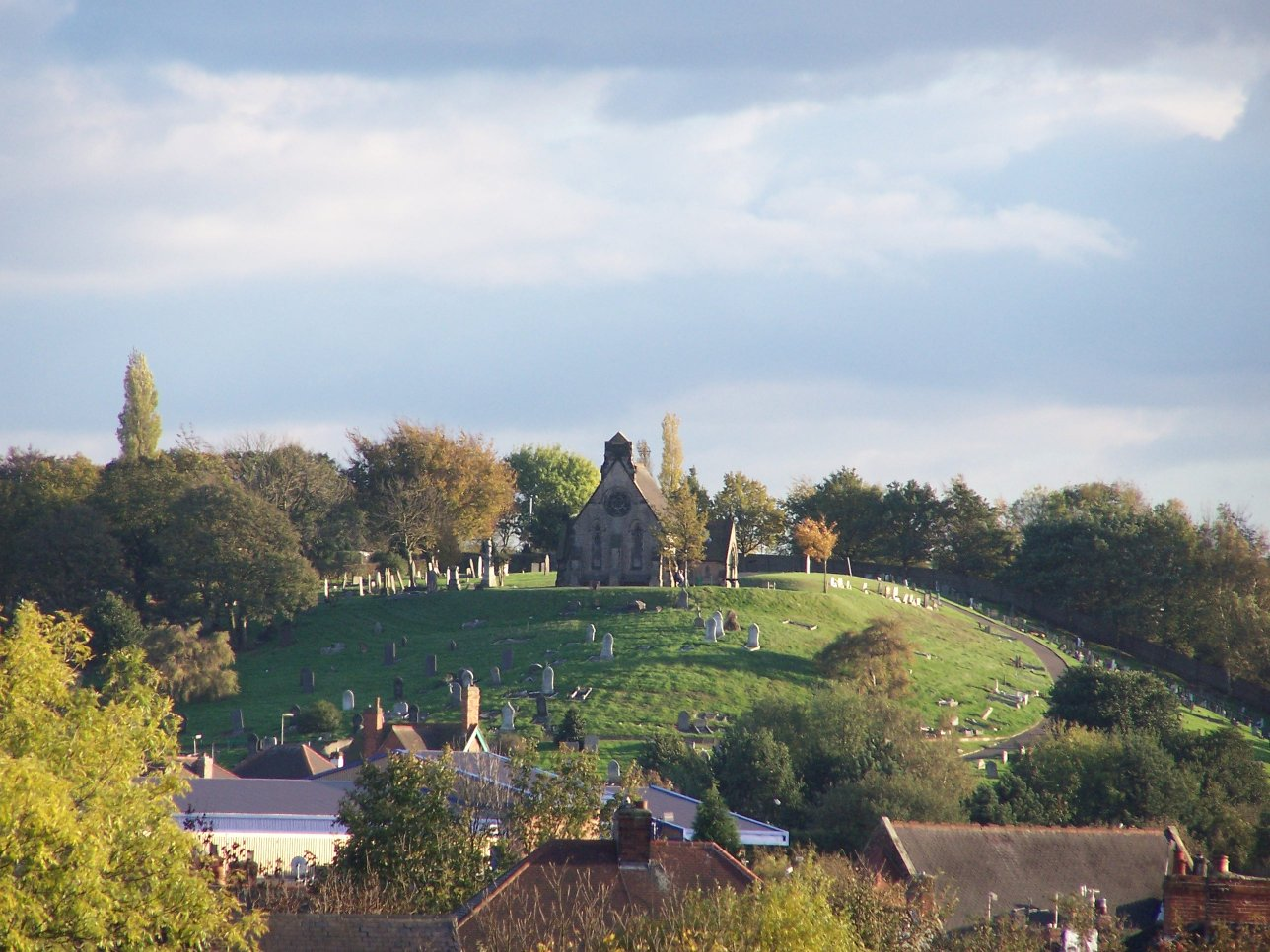
Kimberley Chapel of Rest on Knowle Hill

On the south side of Kimberley lies Swingate, which has many different walking and cycling routes into the woods and surrounding countryside.

The twin towns of Kimberley are Échirolles in France and Grugliasco in Italy.

The former Kimberley Brewery site has within its boundaries a geological Site of Special Scientific Interest (SSSI), listed under the title of "Kimberley Railway Cutting" as an important location for Permian Gymnosperm fossils. The Permian/Carboniferous unconformity is exposed in the cutting.

== Demographics ==
Census population of Kimberley, Nottinghamshire parish
Census	Population	Female	Male	Households	Source
2001	6,237	3,205	3,032	2,613	
2011	6,053	3,067	2,986	2,658	
2021	6,033	3,095	2,938	2,773	

== Notable residents ==
- William Bryan (1856–1933), first-class cricketer
- John Reynolds was British Superbike Champion, 1992, 2001 and 2004
- Sergeant Richard Bolitho was the rear gunner on a Lancaster bomber which crashed with the loss of the whole crew during the Dambuster raid in World War II.
- Elizabeth Arnold competed in the 1992 Olympic Games and the Common wealth games in 1990. Member of the Great British swimming team for over 5 years

== Sport ==
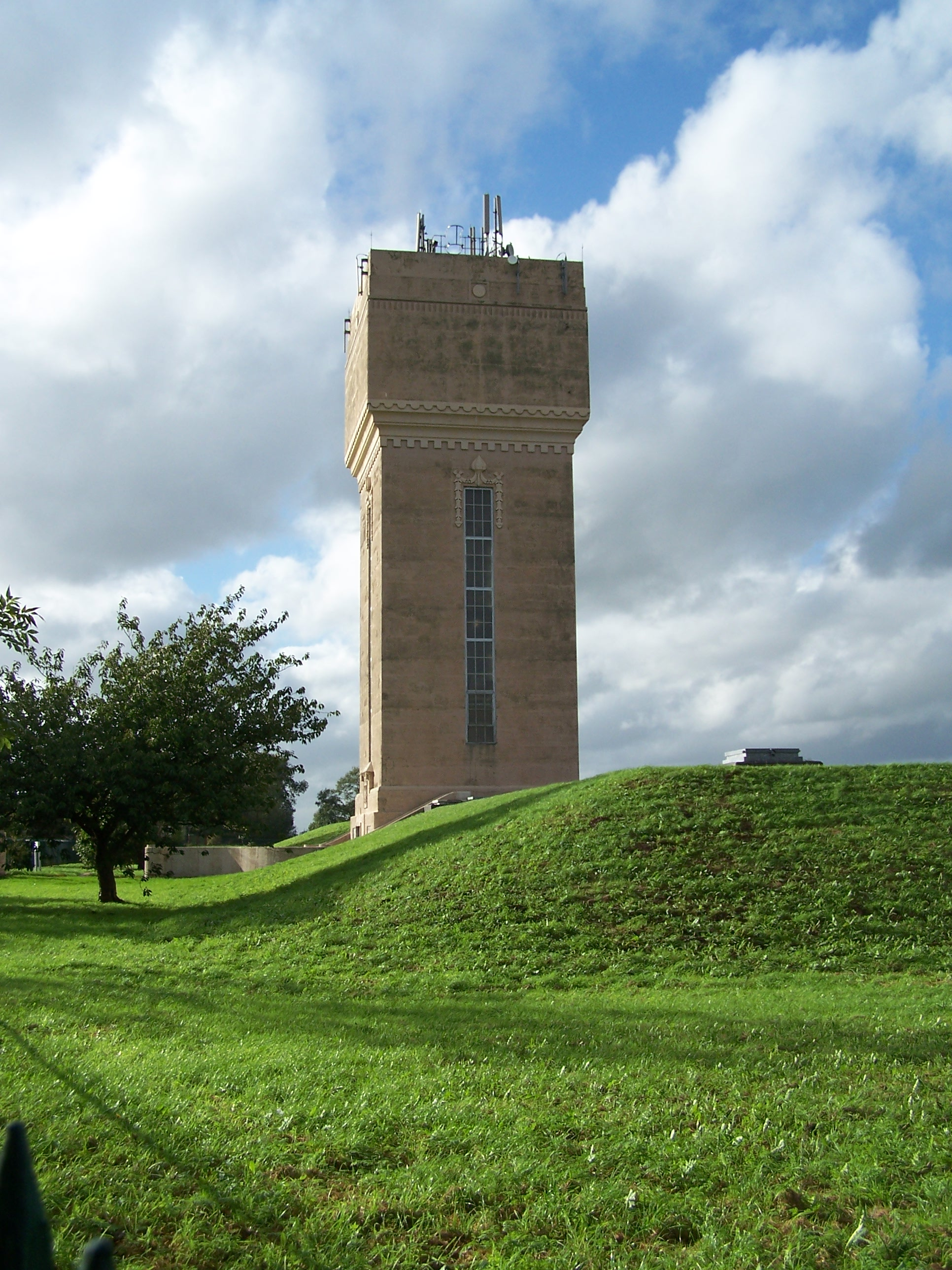
Kimberley's distinctive water tower at Swingate

- Kimberley Miners Welfare F.C. who play in the United Counties League Premier Division North.
- Kimberley Town F.C. were the main local football team until they folded in 2012.
- Kimberley Institute Cricket Club is the town's cricket team.
- Awsworth - Kimberley & District Rifle Club
- Kimberley & District Striders Running Club

== Media ==
Local news and television programmes are BBC East Midlands and ITV Central. Television signals are received from the Waltham TV transmitter, and the Nottingham relay transmitter.

Local radio stations are BBC Radio Nottingham, Capital East Midlands, Smooth East Midlands, Hits Radio East Midlands and Greatest Hits Radio Midlands.

The town is served by local newspaper, Mansfield and Ashfield Chad (formerly Eastwood & Kimberley Advertiser).

== See also ==
- Listed buildings in Kimberley, Nottinghamshire
- Murder of Barbara Mayo, infamous unsolved killing of a woman who was apparently abducted from Kimberley in 1970
- Kimberley West railway station
- Kimberley East railway station
- Watnall railway station
