= Richard Hurt =

English politician

Richard Harte, Hunt or Hurt (died 1616), of Nottingham, was an English politician.

He was a prosperous mercer and made Mayor of Nottingham for 1595–96, 1602–03 and 1609–10. He served as a member (MP) of the parliament of England for Nottingham from 1604 to 1611.
