= Edward Fraser =

British politician

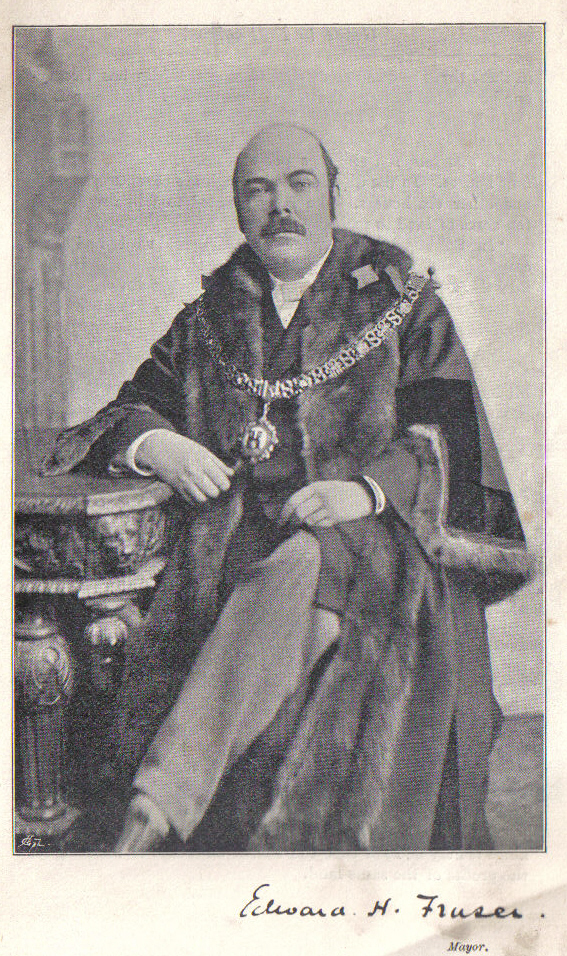
Edward Henry Fraser

Sir Edward Henry Fraser DCL (15 February 1851 – 10 November 1921) was an English solicitor who was Mayor of Nottingham on four occasions. He was born in Nottingham and privately educated.

Edward Fraser's mother was Frances Fraser, born 1830 or 1832. Frances Fraser was a lace maker, as were her sister, Janet Jessie, and Mother, Ann. The Fraser family lived at one time in Toll St., Nottingham. Frances was later a business woman, as she owned a company from home address, as listed in late 1880s Nottingham trade directories and her income was described as from "derived dividends" in the 1871 census. Frances Fraser died 25 January aged 57 years old, and was buried in the Nottingham Church Cemetery (Rock Cemetery), Nottingham.

He became a solicitor by profession, was appointed the first Secretary of the Nottingham Incorporated Law Society and in 1892 elected its President.

In 1876, he was elected a town councillor for Nottingham, served as Sheriff of Nottingham for 1884–85, was made an Alderman in 1889 and elected Mayor of Nottingham for three successive years in 1896–1899. He was chosen a fourth time in 1910 and knighted in 1908. In 1898 he was also conferred with a D.C.L by the Archbishop of Canterbury. He was an unsuccessful candidate in the Parliamentary election of 1900.

He acted as Chairman of the Corporation Finances Committee, was Chairman of the Derwent Water Board and a Governor of Nottingham University College. He was also a Director of various commercial companies, including the Great Central Railway and the Nottingham Permanent Benefit Building Society. As Clerk to the Governors he was also responsible for the finances of Nottingham High School.

He was granted the Freedom of the City of Nottingham and his portrait hangs in the Justice Museum, Nottingham

== Family ==
In 1877, Edward married Jane Keightley, daughter of Charles Keightley, and they lived in 'The Park', Nottingham, in a house (14 Cavendish Crescent North) which the family owned for 60 years. They had one son called Cecil Edward Reginald born 22nd Feb., 1884 who was also a solicitor and JP, and worked for his father at Fraser & Son. Cecil married Ethel Paget Tomlin in 1910, their daughter, Cecily Paget Wilson, was born 13th March, 1914. Edward Fraser had three daughters; Ethel was born 21 Feb., 1882 , baptised 20 July, 1882, St Anthony Anglican, Lenton who died 4 March 1957 at the General Hospital Nottingham, was living at 56 Redcliffe Rd., Mapperley Park, Nottingham, described as a spinster, probate granted 4 December 1957 to Westminster Bank Ltd with effects of £9640 19s 5d(worth £2, 972, 420.81 in 2025). Son Arthur Fraser was born 28 November 1886 and died 18 April 1914 of pneumonia at their residence of 1 Arundel St., Nottingham with his sister Ethel present (according to his death certificate); Arthur Fraser was a farmer. Edward and Jane's second daughter Nora Evelyn Keightley Fraser was born 1 November 1877 and was baptised 5 May 1878 at same church as sister Ethel; she married Bryan Millington 3 May 1899 and lived in Hendon, dying at the Memorial Hospital Finchley (17 October 1945), probate granted 31 May 1946 to sister Ethel with effects valued at £25119 1s 6d (£1.344,402.89 2025). Youngest daughter of Edward and Jane Fraser Constance Mary born 21 March 1891 in Nottingham and similar to her siblings baptised at St Anthony's, in 1919 she married Lieut., Col. T. Dowling (OBE) of Bishop Auckland, it was described as a quiet affair as Sir Edward was ill; father gave piano; brother, Cecil gave her awa and the service was conducted by Edward's brother, Rev. Arthur Fraser; honeymoon in Ireland and the couple lived in Bishop Auckland; she died 13 April 1952.Grand-daughter of Sir Edward and Dame Jane Fraser, daughter of Cecil and Ethel Fraser was born 13 March 1914 and died in USA 27 Jan., 1955.

== Death ==
Sir Edward Henry Fraser died at Wellington House, Nottingham and Dame Jane Fraser (wife) died 22nd May 1922 at same address - probate states her effects £5505 12s 10d
