= Merlita Bryan =

Jamaican-British local politician (born 1951)

Merlita Bryan MBE (born 1951) is a Jamaican-born-British local politician.

== Life and work ==
Bryan was born in 1951, in Saint Thomas Parish, Jamaica. In December 1962, she emigrated to Nottingham to reunite with her parents.

From 2013 to 2014, she served as the Lord Mayor of Nottingham.

In 2011/12 and again in 2021/22 she was appointed as the Sheriff of Nottingham.

In 2024, she was named in the King's Birthday Honours list, and awarded an MBE.

From 6 April, 2026, she was appointed High Sheriff of Nottinghamshire.
