= Thomas Wakefield (mayor of Nottingham) =

Mayor of Nottingham, England

Thomas Wakefield (1791–1871) first mayor of Nottingham for the new municipal borough in 1835 and again in 1842. Wakefield was an English local politician and businessman in Nottingham. He was a success at the former role as "leader of the whig Liberal group that dominated the Nottingham borough council", "that he was frequently referred to as “King Wakefield,”" but, having been involved in a range of businesses, including textile manufacturing, newspapers and mining, he ultimately failed in the latter role. After going bankrupt in 1848, he led a less conspicuous later life as an official.

A fulsome description of Wakefield in his pomp was given by Bernard Burke:

One whom we often met [at Nottingham Castle] was at that period "the foremost man of all the town", Thomas Wakefield, a nephew of the brilliant scholar and critic of his name. He was a most genial, kind-hearted, and pleasant fellow, the idol of his townsmen, and, from his immense influence and popularity, was generally known as King Tom. He was more than once solicited to become M.P. for Nottingham, was a welcome guest at Newstead, Bunny Park, and other county seats, and in his second or third mayoralty, was entertained at a banquet in the Exchange Hall, at which he was presented with the most costly service of gold plate ever presented, at one and the same time, to one individual.

== Life ==
He was the son of the cotton spinner Francis Wakefield (died 1820), who married Mary Ward in 1782. His father Francis was the fourth son of the Rev. George Wakefield and younger brother of Gilbert Wakefield, successful in business and described as "unassuming and polished". He was involved in the development of Nottingham General Hospital, and as a member of the congregation of St Peter's Church active in promoting local Sunday schools.

Wakefield was a generous benefactor to local causes, but also a slum landlord in Nottingham. He lived, as his father had done, on Low Pavement; and then after losing his fortune, in the Exchange Buildings.

== In business ==
Wakefield was given a share in his father's firm in 1816, at that time trading as Hancock Wakefield & Harker. With his brother Francis the younger, ran the family textile company, from 1825 when the other partner John Hancock was bought out, a cotton mill in Mansfield. They were in business together at Church Gate, Nottingham. The company was fined under child labour legislation in 1837, for employment of children under 13 in Mansfield in 1837. The Field and Town Mills in Mansfield used by the company were to let in 1840. In 1843, the partnership Francis & Thomas Wakefield was dissolved; and Thomas by 1844 had a share in the textile business Kelly & Co. in Leicester. Francis died in 1848.

The partnership had been involved also in hosiery, and brass and iron foundries. Thomas Wakefield went into the colliery business with Thomas North in 1835. From coal mines in Babbington, he provided capital for investment in further mines in the Nottinghamshire and Derbyshire Coalfield, located in north Nottinghamshire, and a network of railway lines connecting them. Two other partners, including a member of the Morley family, proprietors of hosiery manufacturer I. & R. Morley, had joined by 1845.

Further investment in a deeper mine, Cinderhill Colliery in the same area as Babbington, then proved a risky strategy. A hiatus in production from 1845 to 1847 coincided with financial difficulties for Wakefield, bankrupting him. North continued as proprietor, backed by Wright's Bank.

== Local politics ==
In 1815–6 Wakefield was one of Nottingham's two sheriffs, serving with Richard Hopper Jr. A Whig and Liberal reformer rather than a radical, Wakefield was a senior councilman of the pre-reform Nottingham borough. In 1819, in the aftermath of Peterloo, he addressed a meeting in Nottingham on the defence of the right to petition.

During the Great Reform Bill period 1830–1, Wakefield organised a local reform petition, with John Heard. It did not prevent him suffering some heckling from the more advanced radicals. His name was brought up at this time as a potential Whig parliamentary candidate for the two-member Nottingham constituency, to stand with Thomas Denman; but Sir Ronald Craufurd Ferguson was preferred. During the 1831–2 outbreak in Nottingham of the 1826–1837 cholera pandemic, Wakefield chaired the emergency Board of Health.

In 1836, when the Town Council of Nottingham met for the first time, Wakefield was elected as mayor; nominally this was for the year 1835–6. He was elected mayor for a second time in 1842. In 1847 he sold out his major interest in the Nottingham Mercury, which he had used for two decades to campaign against enclosures, to Thomas Bailey.

== Later life ==
As bankruptcy proceedings took their course, Wakefield was in 1849 living in Lenton, at that time outside the city of Nottingham. Among the job's he subsequently took on were Mayor's Sergeant, and Keeper of the Exchange and Public Office rooms. He died at the Police Office on Smithy Row, where he was living, as Mayor's Sargeant, Inspector of Weights and Measures, and Billet Master, on 25 October 1871.

== Other interests ==
Wakefield was a Unitarian, and in 1837 supported the founding of a Mechanics' Institute; he was also from 1826 to 1850 president of the Artisans' Library. He clashed in 1830–1, as reported in The Lancet, with Thomas Jowett (1801–1832), a surgeon and botanist, over control of the Nottingham Dispensary. He was a friend of the Nottingham poet Robert Millhouse.
