= Octavius Thomas Oldknow =

Octavius Thomas Oldknow (12 April 1786 - 7 November 1854) was Sheriff of Nottingham 1806–07, Mayor of Nottingham in 1822 and 1829, and Postmaster of Nottingham from 1846 to 1854.

== History ==
He was born on 12 April 1786 in Nottingham, the son of Joseph Oldknow (1746-1808) and Mary Robert (1746-1824).

He married Susanna Wilson (1793-1828), second daughter of the Revd. John Wilson of Chapel House, Matlock Bath, on 12 April 1808 in St Giles' Church, Matlock, Derbyshire, and they had the following children:

- Joseph Oldknow (1809-1874)
- John Wilson Oldknow (1810-1887)
- Susannah Oldknow (1812-1876)
- Samuel Oldknow (1814-1869)
- Mary Ann Oldknow (1816-1884)
- Harriett Oldknow (1817-1880)
- Henry Oldknow (1819-1868)
- Hannah Oldknow

Initially, he ran a grocery and tallow chandlery business in Nottingham in copartnership with Mary Oldknow, but this partnership was dissolved on 8 January 1813.

He also maintained a business partnership with Joseph Turner and Robert Wilson operating under the firm of Joseph Turner and Company, Drapers, Mercers, Hatters and Hosiers at Oakham, but this partnership was dissolved on 14 December 1831.

A drapery business on Beastmarket Hill operated for many years with Robert Wilson under the partnership of Oldknow and Wilson, but from 1832 this partnership was dissolved and he continued the business alone.

He was sworn in as Mayor of Nottingham in 1822 and again in 1829 in St Mary's Church, Nottingham.

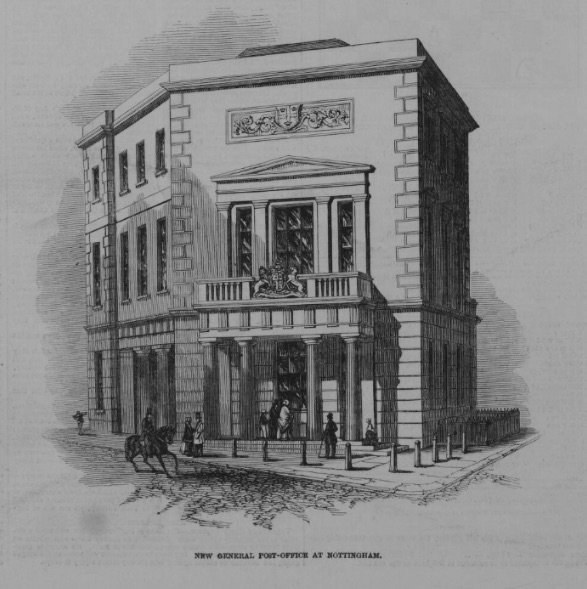
The new Post Office from the Illustrated London News 6 November 1847

In December 1846 he was appointed Postmaster of Nottingham a position he held until his death. Shortly after his appointment, the Central Post Office in Nottingham moved from its premises on Bridlesmith Gate to the newly constructed Post Office buildings on St Peter's Churchside.

He died on 7 November 1854.
