= List of mayors of Nottingham =

Lord Mayor of Nottingham
- Nottingham Coat of arms
- Incumbent; Cheryl Bernard, Lab since May 2026
- Nottingham City Council
- Style: Lord Mayor
- Status: Lord Mayor
- Member of: Nottingham City Council; Labour Nottingham
- Residence: Nottingham
- Seat: Loxley House; Nottingham Council House
- Nominator: Political parties
- Appointer: Electorate of Nottingham
- Term length: no set term
- Inaugural holder: Edward Fraser
- Formation: 1284
- Deputy: Deputy Mayors
- Website: Mayor website

The Lord Mayor of Nottingham is a largely ceremonial role for the city of Nottingham, England.

The position was historically Mayor of Nottingham; this was changed to Lord Mayor in 1928. The position is elected every May by Nottingham city councillors at their annual council meeting.

Some of the duties of the Lord Mayor include being a champion of the city and attending official events. The role also includes supporting up to three charities and presenting the Lord Mayor's Awards for Urban Design.

== History ==
The post of Mayor of Nottingham was created in the Charter of Edward I approved on 12 February 1284.

The title was changed to Lord Mayor of Nottingham by letters patent, announced by King George V on 10 July 1928, at the opening of the new University College at Highfields. The first holder of the title was the Mayor for the current year, Alderman Edmund Huntsman.

Contrary to popular belief, the Mayoral status was unaffected when Nottingham achieved city status during the Diamond Jubilee of Queen Victoria in June 1897. The bestowing of City status is normally a separate issue to the rank of the Mayor concerned. In fact, there is only one case of a Borough being given City status and its Mayor being elevated to Lord Mayor at the same time – this occurred with Cardiff in 1905. It has recently (i.e. since 2002) become the established rule that newly created cities should wait for an interval of at least 10 years before making an application for a Lord Mayoralty.

After City status had been awarded, Nottingham applied (unsuccessfully) for a Lord Mayor in 1911 (marking the Coronation of King George V), and to mark Royal visits in both 1914 and 1919.

Historically, the Mayor of Nottingham was elected in a ceremony in St. Mary's Church, Nottingham. Although the election no longer happens in the church, a civic service is held there each year to mark the Lord Mayor's appointment.

== Mayors of the Borough of Nottingham (1284–1897) ==
Source: Nottingham City Council

=== 13th century ===
- 1284/85 Roger de Crophill
- 1285/86 Hugh le Fleming .
- 1286/87 John le Fleming
- 1287/88 No known name
- 1288/89 No known name
- 1289/90 No known name
- 1290/91 Roger de Crophill
- 1291/92 No known name
- 1292/93 Michael Aurifaber
- 1293/94 No known name
- 1294/95 Ralph de Ufton
- 1295/96 Adam le Palmer
- 1296/97 No known name
- 1297/98 Michael Aurifaber
- 1298/99 No known name
- 1299/1300 William de Normanton

=== 14th century ===
- 1300/01 John le Fleming
- 1301/02 Richard le Cupper
- 1302/03 John le Palmer
- 1303/04 John le Palmer
- 1304/05 John le Bere
- 1305/06 Adam le Fleming
- 1306/07 John le Palmer
- 1307/08 John Kytte
- 1308/09 John Kytte
- 1309/10 John Kytte
- 1310/11 Walter de Thornton
- 1311/12 John le Palmer
- 1312/13 Walter de Thorneton
- 1313/14 Peter de Morwood
- 1314/15 Robert Ingram
- 1315/16 Robert Ingram
- 1316/17 William de Mekisburg
- 1317/18 Robert le Crophill
- 1318/19 Walter de Lincoln
- 1319/20 No known name
- 1320/21 Robert Ingram
- 1321/22 Robert de Crophill
- 1322/23 Robert Ingram
- 1327/28 John Brian
- 1328/29 William de Amyas
- 1329/30 Ralph le Tavener
- 1330/31 Nicholas de Shelford
- 1331/32 Laurence le Spicer
- 1332/33 Henry de Cesterfield
- 1333/34 William de Amyas
- 1334/35 Roger de Botchal
- 1335/36 Laurence le Spicer
- 1336/37 Robert de Crophill
- 1337/38 Henry de Cesterfield
- 1338/39 Henry de Cesterfield
- 1339/40 John le Colyer
- 1340/41 Ralph de Wolaton
- 1341/42 Roger de Botchal
- 1342/43 No known name
- 1343/44 No known name
- 1344/45 John de Tunby
- 1345/46 John de Tunby
- 1346/47 Thomas de Edwalton
- 1347/48 Robert de Morwood
- 1348/49 Nicholas de Crophill
- 1349/50 No known name
- 1350/51 No known name
- 1351/52 Richard de Lyndby
- 1352/53 John Bridgford
- 1353/54 Walter de Walton
- 1354/55 Simon Bertevill
- 1355/56 Richard Salmon
- 1356/57 John de Thornton
- 1357/58 Walter de Walton
- 1358/59 No known name
- 1359/60 Hugh le Spicer
- 1360/61 Nicholas de Crophill
- 1361/62 John Samon
- 1362/63 Roger de Hopwell
- 1363/64 Ralph de Tollerton
- 1364/65 Roger de Hopwell
- 1365/66 John Samon
- 1370/71 John Samon
- 1371/72 No known name
- 1372/73 Roger de Holm
- 1373/74 Roger Masson
- 1374/75 Ralph Torkard
- 1375/76 John Samon
- 1376/77 No known name
- 1377/78 Roger Masson
- 1378/79 John Samon
- 1379/80 John de Plumptre
- 1380/81 William de Thrumpton
- 1381/82 Ralph Plot
- 1382/83 John de Crowshawe
- 1383/84 John Samon
- 1384/85 Richard Hanneson John Samon
- 1385/86 John de Plumptre
- 1386/87 Richard ate Chanons
- 1387/88 Henry de Plumptre
- 1388/89 John de Crawshawe
- 1389/90 John de Crawshawe
- 1390/91 Robert Squire
- 1391/92 John de Plumptre
- 1392/93 Henry de Normanton
- 1393/94 William Huntston
- 1394/95 John de Plumptre
- 1395/96 John de Plumptre
- 1396/97 John Samon
- 1397/98 No known name
- 1398/99 Henry de Wilford
- 1399/1400 John de Tannesley

=== 15th century ===
- 1400/01 Hugh de Lyndby
- 1401/02 Robert Squire
- 1402/03 Thomas de Mapperley
- 1403/04 Thomas de Stanley
- 1404/05 Robert Glade
- 1405/06 Thomas Kay
- 1406/07 Thomas Fox
- 1407/08 John Samon
- 1408/09 John de Plumptre
- 1409/10 John de Alastre
- 1410/11 John de Tannesley
- 1411/12 John de Heath
- 1412/13 Henry de Wilford
- 1413/14 Robert Glade
- 1415/16 Thomas Kay
- 1416/17 William Stokes
- 1417/18 Richard Tavener
- 1418/19 Richard Samon
- 1419/20 Robert Glade
- 1420/21 John Alastre
- 1421/22 Thomas Page
- 1422/23 Richard Salmon
- 1423/24 Robert Glade
- 1424/25 No known name
- 1425/26 William Stokes
- 1426/27 John Alastre
- 1427/28 John Plumptre
- 1428/29 Richard Samon
- 1429/30 William Brodholm
- 1430/31 John Alastre
- 1431/32 William Halifax
- 1432/33 Richaed Samon
- 1433/34 John Etwell
- 1434/35 William Brodholm
- 1435/36 John Orgrave
- 1436/37 Thomas Alastre
- 1437/38 John Plumptre
- 1438/39 William Webster
- 1439/40 Richard Samon
- 1440/41 William Halifax
- 1441/42 John Orgrave
- 1442/43 Thomas Thurland
- 1443/44 Robert Raysyn
- 1444/45 Thomas Alastre
- 1445/46 John Plumptre
- 1446/47 Geoffrey Knyveton
- 1447/48 Thomas Thurland
- 1448/49 Thomas Thurland
- 1449/50 John Orgrave
- 1450/51 Thomas Thurland
- 1451/52 Richard Samon
- 1452/53 Thomas Alastre
- 1453/54 Thomas Thurland
- 1454/55 John Plumptre
- 1455/56 John Squire
- 1456/57 John Orgrave
- 1457/58 Richard Wood
- 1458/59 Thomas Thurland
- 1459/60 Thomas Thurland
- 1460/61 John Hunt
- 1461/62 Thomas Alestre
- 1462/63 Thomas Thurland
- 1460/61 John Hunt
- 1461/62 Thomas Alestre
- 1462/63 Thomas Thurland
- 1463/64 Thomas Thurland
- 1464/65 John Squyer
- 1465/66 Richard Wood
- 1466/67 Robert Stable
- 1467/68 John Hunt
- 1468/69 John Squire
- 1469/70 Thomas Alastre
- 1470/71 Robert English
- 1471/72 Thomas Lokton
- 1472/73 Roger Hudson
- 1473/74 John Mapperley
- 1474/75 John Hunt
- 1475/76 John Hunt
- 1476/77 John Clerk
- 1477/78 Robert English
- 1478/79 John Paynter
- 1479/80 Edmund Hunt
- 1480/81 William Hegyn
- 1481/82 John Mapperley
- 1482/83 John Hunt
- 1483/84 John Clerk
- 1484/85 Thomas Thurland
- 1485/86 Richard Alastre
- 1486/87 William Hegyn
- 1487/88 Richard Ody
- 1488/89 Thomas Warner
- 1489/90 Walter Hylton
- 1490/91 Thomas Thurland
- 1491/92 John Clerk
- 1492/93 John Wedurley
- 1493/94 Robert Hegyn
- 1494/95 Richard Ody
- 1495/96 Thomas Warner
- 1496/97 Walter Hylton
- 1497/98 John Selyok
- 1498/99 John Selyok
- 1499/1500 Richard Mellours

=== 16th century ===
- 1500/01 William Hegyn
- 1501/02 John Cost
- 1502/03 Thomas Warner
- 1503/04 John Wedurley
- 1504/05 John Howit
- 1505/06 John Selyok
- 1506/07 Richard Mellours
- 1507/08 Richard Pykard
- 1508/09 John Cost
- 1509/10 John Williamson
- 1510/11 John Williamson
- 1511/12 John Howet
- 1512/13 Thomas Alastre
- 1513/14 John Roose
- 1514/15 John Cost
- 1515/16 Thomas Mellours
- 1516/17 Richard Rydgeley
- 1517/18 John Wilkinson
- 1518/19 Thomas Willughby
- 1519/20 William English
- 1520/21 John Roose
- 1521/22 Robert Mellours
- 1522/23 Robert Mellours
- 1523/24 William Kyrkby
- 1524/25 John Williamson
- 1525/26 Robert Hessylryge
- 1526/27 John Roose
- 1527/28 William Parmatour
- 1528/29 John Howes
- 1529/30 Thomas Mellours
- 1530/31 Costin (Constantine) Pyckard
- 1531/32 Thomas Hobbes
- 1532/33 Thomas Hessylryge
- 1533/34 John Dowbleday
- 1534/35 William Parmatour
- 1535/36 John Howes
- 1536/37 John Yates
- 1537/38 Edward Chamberleyn
- 1538/39 Thomas Hobbes
- 1539/40 Robert Hessylryge
- 1540/41 John Alenson Robert Lovatt
- 1541/42 Robert Lovatt
- 1542/43 Humphrey Querneby
- 1543/44 Richard Willughbye
- 1544/45 Edward Chamberleyn
- 1545/46 Thomas Coughen
- 1546/47 William Atkinson
- 1547/48 Thomas Dawson
- 1548/49 Robert Lovatt
- 1549/50 Humphrey Querneby
- 1550/51 Edward Chamberleyn
- 1551/52 Thomas Coughen
- 1552/53 John Colinson
- 1553/54 Robert Hesilrig
- 1554/55 Robert Hesilrig
- 1557/58 John Heskey William Atkynson
- 1558/59 Thomas Cockeyn
- 1559/60 Nicholas Bonner
- 1560/61 Henry Fossebrook
- 1561/62 John Gregory
- 1562/63 Humphrey Quarneby
- 1563/64 John Collinson
- 1564/65 Thomas Cockeyn
- 1565/66 Nicholas Bonner
- 1566/67 Henry Fossebrook
- 1567/68 John Brownlow
- 1568/69 John Brownlow
- 1569/70 Henry Newton
- 1570/71 Richard James
- 1571/72 John Gregory
- 1572/73 Robert Standley
- 1573/74 Robert Alvey
- 1574/75 Robert Burton
- 1575/76 John Brownlow
- 1576/77 Henry Newton
- 1577/78 Richard James
- 1578/79 William Scott
- 1579/80 John Gregory
- 1580/81 Robert Alvey
- 1581/82 Robert Burton
- 1582/83 John Brownlow
- 1583/84 William Gellestrope
- 1584/85 Peter Clark
- 1585/86 William Scott
- 1586/87 John Gregory
- 1587/88 Robert Alvey
- 1588/89 Robert Marsh
- 1589/90 John Brownlow
- 1590/91 William Gellestrope
- 1591/92 Peter Clark
- 1592/93 William Scott
- 1593/94 Humphrey Bonner
- 1594/95 Robert Alvey
- 1595/96 Richard Hurt
- 1596/97 Richard Morehage
- 1597/98 Peter Clark
- 1598/99 Anker Jackson
- 1599/1600 William Freeman

=== 17th century ===
- 1600/01 Humphrey Bonner
- 1601/02 Robert Staples
- 1602/03 Richard Hurt
- 1603/04 Richard Morehaghe
- 1604/05 Richard Welch
- 1605/06 Anker Jackson
- 1606/07 William Freeman
- 1607/08 Humphrey Bonner
- 1608/09 Robert Staples
- 1609/10 Richard Hurt
- 1610/11 Richard Morehage
- 1611/12 Richard Welch
- 1612/13 Anker Jackson
- 1613/14 William Freeman
- 1614/15 Richard Parker
- 1615/16 Robert Staples
- 1616/17 Thomas Nix
- 1617/18 Leonard Nix
- 1618/19 Stephen Hill
- 1619/20 Anker Jackson
- 1620/21 Marmaduke Gregory
- 1621/22 Richard Parker
- 1622/23 Robert Staple
- 1623/24 Robert Sherwin
- 1624/25 Leonard Nix
- 1625/26 Stephen Hill
- 1626/27 Robert Parker
- 1627/28 John James
- 1628/29 Richard Parker
- 1629/30 Alexander Staples
- 1630/31 Robert Sherwin
- 1631/32 Leonard Nix
- 1632/33 William Gregory
- 1633/34 Robert Parker
- 1634/35 John James
- 1635/36 Richard Hardmeat
- 1636/37 William Nix
- 1637/38 Robert Sherwin
- 1638/39 Robert Burton
- 1639/40 William Gregory
- 1640/41 William Drury
- 1641/42 John James
- 1642/43 Richard Hardmeat
- 1643/44 William Nix
- 1644/45 William Nix
- 1645/46 Thomas Gamble
- 1646/47 John James
- 1647/48 William Drury
- 1648/49 William Richards
- 1649/50 William Nix
- 1650/51 Thomas Gamble
- 1651/52 Richard Dring
- 1652/53 William Drury
- 1653/54 Francis Toplady
- 1654/55 John Parker
- 1655/56 Thomas Huthwaite
- 1656/57 William Richards
- 1657/58 Thomas Gamble
- 1658/59 Richard Dring John Fillingham
- 1659/60 William Drury
- 1660/61 Francis Toplady
- 1661/62 John Parker
- 1662/63 John Toplady
- 1663/64 William Greaves
- 1664/65 Ralph Edge
- 1665/66 William Jackson
- 1666/67 Richard Hodgkin
- 1667/68 Joseph Wright
- 1668/69 John Parker
- 1669/70 Christopher Hall
- 1670/71 William Greaves
- 1671/72 Ralph Edge
- 1672/73 William Jackson
- 1673/74 Richard Hodgkin
- 1674/75 Joseph Wright Samuel Watkinson
- 1675/76 John Parker
- 1676/77 Christopher Hall
- 1677/78 William Greaves
- 1678/79 Ralph Edge
- 1679/80 John Parker Jnr.
- 1680/81 Gervas Rippon
- 1681/82 Gervas Wylde
- 1682/83 William Toplady
- 1683/84 Christopher Hall
- 1684/85 William Petty
- 1685/86 Robert Wortley
- 1686/87 John Parker
- 1687/88 Gervas Rippon John Sherwin George Langford
- 1688/89 George Langford
- 1689/90 Charles Harvey
- 1690/91 John Hawkins
- 1691/92 Joseph Turpin
- 1692/93 William Greaves
- 1693/94 Thomas Trigge
- 1696/97 Francis Salmon
- 1697/98 Samuel Lealand
- 1698/99 William Greaves
- 1699/1700 Thomas Collin

=== 18th century ===
- 1700/01 Samuel Watkinson
- 1701/02 John Rickards
- 1702/03 John Peake
- 1703/04 Samuel Smith
- 1704/05 William Barke
- 1705/06 John Shipman
- 1706/07 Francis Salmon
- 1707/08 William Drury
- 1708/09 Samuel Watkinson
- 1709/10 John Peake
- 1710/11 Samuel Smith
- 1711/12 Benjamin Green
- 1712/13 William Barke
- 1713/14 John Collin
- 1714/15 John Shipman
- 1715/16 Thomas Hawkesley / Samuel Watkinson
- 1716/17 John Sherwin
- 1717/18 Thomas Trigge
- 1718/19 Marmaduke Pennel
- 1719/20 Richard Bearn
- 1720/21 William Bilbie
- 1721/22 Benjamin Green
- 1722/23 Alexander Burden
- 1723/24 Thomas Trigge
- 1724/25 Marmaduke Pennel
- 1725/26 Richard Bearn
- 1726/27 William Bilbie
- 1727/28 Joseph Walters
- 1728/29 Benjamin Green
- 1729/30 Alexander Burden
- 1730/31 William Trigge
- 1731/32 Thomas Trigge
- 1732/33 John Huthwaite
- 1733/34 Thomas Langford
- 1734/35 William Bilbie
- 1735/36 Benjamin Green
- 1736/37 Alexander Burden
- 1737/38 William Trigge
- 1738/39 John Newton
- 1739/40 James Huthwaite
- 1740/41 Thomas Langford
- 1741/42 Alexander Burden
- 1742/43 William Trigge
- 1743/44 John Hornbuckle
- 1744/45 John Burton
- 1745/46 Henry Butler
- 1746/47 James Huthwaite
- 1747/48 Thomas Langford
- 1748/49 William Trigge
- 1749/50 John Hornbuckle
- 1750/51 John Burton
- 1751/52 Henry Butler
- 1752/53 James Huthwaite
- 1753/54 Thomas Langford
- 1754/55 John Hornbuckle
- 1755/56 Samuel Fellows
- 1756/57 John Burton
- 1757/58 Cornelius Huthwaite
- 1758/59 Henry Butler
- 1759/60 Isaac Wylde / Thomas Langford
- 1760/61 Robert Huish
- 1761/62 James Hornbuckle
- 1762/63 Humphrey Hollins
- 1763/64 Cornelius Huthwaite
- 1764/65 Henry Butler
- 1765/66 William Cooper
- 1766/67 Robie Swann
- 1767/68 James Hornbuckle
- 1768/69 William Foulds
- 1769/70 Humphrey Hollins
- 1770/71 Richard Butler
- 1771/72 Cornelius Huthwaite
- 1772/73 Henry Butler / Richard Butler
- 1773/74 Thomas Oldknow
- 1774/75 John Caruthers
- 1775/76 John Fellows
- 1776/77 Thomas Sands
- 1777/78 Richard Butler
- 1778/79 Thomas Oldknow
- 1779/80 William Huthwaite
- 1780/81 John Smellie
- 1781/82 John Caruthers
- 1782/83 John Fellows
- 1783/84 Richard Butler
- 1784/85 William Howitt
- 1785/86 William Huthwaite
- 1786/87 John Caruthers
- 1787/88 Joseph Lowe
- 1788/89 William Smith
- 1789/90 Richard Butler
- 1790/91 John Fellows
- 1791/92 William Huthwaite
- 1792/93 Joseph Oldknow
- 1793/94 Henry Green
- 1794/95 Thomas Caunt
- 1795/96 Benjamin Hornbuckle
- 1796/97 William Howitt
- 1797/98 Joseph Lowe
- 1798/99 Thomas Oldknow
- 1799/1800 Joseph Oldknow

=== 19th century ===
- 1800/01 Samuel Worthington
- 1801/02 John Davison
- 1802/03 Benjamin Hornbuckle
- 1803/04 Stokeham Huthwaite
- 1804/05 John Ashwell
- 1805/06 Edward Swann
- 1806/07 John Allen
- 1807/08 Joseph Lowe
- 1808/09 William Howitt
- 1809/10 Wright Coldham
- 1810/11 John Bates
- 1811/12 William Wilson
- 1812/13 Edward Swann
- 1813/14 John Allen
- 1814/15 John Ashwell
- 1815/16 Charles L. Morley
- 1816/17 William Wilson
- 1817/18 John H. Barber
- 1818/19 Isaac Woolley
- 1819/20 William Soars
- 1820/21 John Ashwell
- 1821/22 Charles L. Morley
- 1822/23 Octavius Thomas Oldknow
- 1823/24 William Wilson
- 1824/25 Samuel Deverill
- 1825/26 John H. Barber
- 1826/27 John Allen
- 1827/28 William Soars
- 1828/29 Charles l. Morley
- 1829/30 Octavius Thomas Oldknow
- 1830/31 William Wilson
- 1831/32 John H. Barber
- 1832/33 John Heard
- 1833/34 William Soars
- 1834/35 Charles L. Morley
- 1835/36 Thomas Wakefield
- 1836/37 Richard Morley
- 1837/38 John Heard
- 1838/39 John Wells
- 1839/40 William Roworth
- 1840/41 John M. B. Pigot
- 1841/42 Richard Morley
- 1842/43 Thomas Wakefield
- 1843/44 William Vickers
- 1844/45 Thomas North
- 1845/46 Thomas Herbert
- 1846/47 William Cripps
- 1847/48 John Heard
- 1848/49 Thomas Carver
- 1849/50 Richard Birkin
- 1850/51 William Felkin
- 1851/52 William Felkin
- 1852/53 Thomas Cullen
- 1853/54 Jonathon Reckless
- 1854/55 John L. Thackery
- 1855/56 Richard Birkin
- 1856/57 John Bradley
- 1857/58 Lewis Heyman
- 1858/59 Edwin Patchitt
- 1859/60 Edwin Patchitt
- 1860/61 Thomas Cullen
- 1861/62 Richard Birkin
- 1862/63 Richard Birkin
- 1863/64 William Parsons
- 1864/65 William Page
- 1865/66 Thomas Ball
- 1866/67 John L. Thackery
- 1867/68 John Barber
- 1868/69 John Barber
- 1869/70 James Oldknow
- 1870/71 John Manning
- 1871/72 William G. Ward
- 1872/73 William Foster
- 1873/74 John Howitt
- 1874/75 William Lambert
- 1875/76 John Manning
- 1876/77 John Bowers
- 1877/78 William G. Ward
- 1878/79 Sir James Oldknow
- 1879/80 Sir James Oldknow
- 1880/81 Edward Gripper
- 1881/82 Edward Goldschmidt
- 1882/83 Leonard Lindley
- 1883/84 John Manning
- 1884/85 John Burton
- 1885/86 William Lambert
- 1886/87 John Turney
- 1887/88 John Turney
- 1888/89 John Renals
- 1889/90 Edward Goldschmidt
- 1890/91 Samuel E. Sands
- 1891/92 Richard Fitzhugh
- 1892/93 Anderson Brownsword
- 1893/94 Frederick Pullman
- 1894/95 Joseph Bright
- 1895/96 Joseph Bright

== Mayors of the City of Nottingham (1897–1928) ==
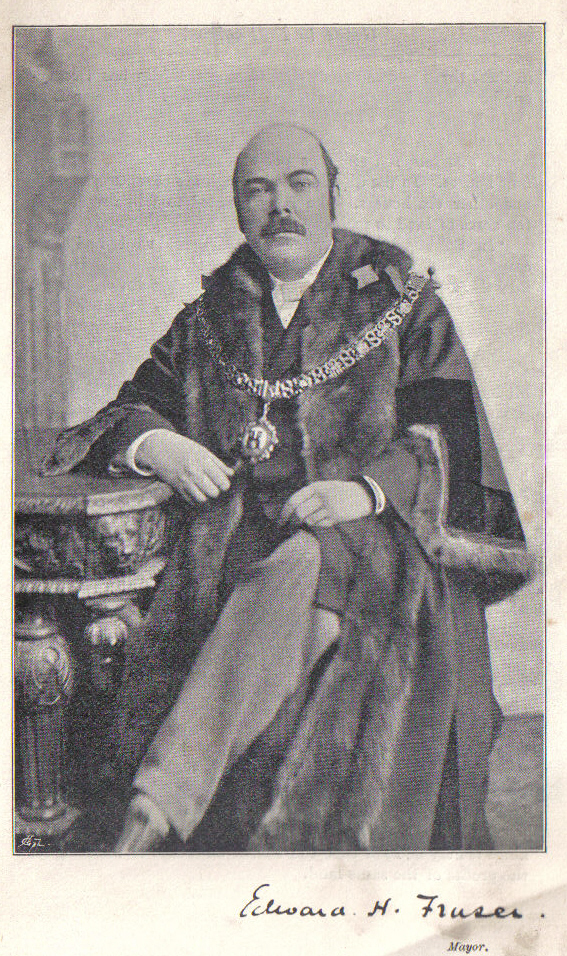
Edward Fraser, Mayor of Nottingham

- 1896/97 Edward Henry Fraser
- 1897/98 Edward Henry Fraser
- 1898/99 Edward Henry Fraser
- 1899/1900 Abraham Pyatt
- 1900/01 Frederick R. Radford
- 1901/02 Edward N. Elborne (Conservative)
- 1902/03 Arthur W. Black
- 1903/04 Alfred Page
- 1904/05 Joseph Bright
- 1905/06 Arthur Cleaver
- 1906/07 John Alfred H. Green
- 1907/08 John T. Spalding
- 1908/09 John Ashworth
- 1909/10 Albert Ball
- 1910/11 Sir Edward Henry Fraser
- 1911/12 Edwin Mellor
- 1912/13 Thomas Ward
- 1913/14 Frederick Ball
- 1914/15 John Henry Gregg
- 1915/16 John C. Small
- 1916/17 John E. Pendleton
- 1917/18 John C. Small
- 1918/19 John E. Pendleton
- 1919/20 John Morris
- 1920/21 Herbert Bowles
- 1921/22 Frederick Berryman
- 1922/23 Edward L. Manning
- 1923/24 John Houston
- 1924/25 James Clarkson
- 1925/26 Charles Foulds
- 1926/27 John H. Freckingham
- 1927/28 Ald. Edmund Huntsman

== Lord Mayors of Nottingham (1928–present) ==
=== 1928–1939 ===
- 1928 Edmund Huntsman
- 1928/29 Albert Reuben Atkey
- 1929/30 Walter Wessen
- 1930/31 Arthur Pollard
- 1931/32 William Green
- 1932/33 S. Whitby
- 1933/34 John Farr
- 1934/35 Richard E. Ashworth
- 1935/36 Albert Ball
- 1936/37 E. Purser
- 1937/38 William Hooley
- 1938/39 Joseph Baldwin
- 1939/40 Wallace Binch

=== 1940–1949 ===
- 1940/41 Walter Halls
- 1941/42 Louis Pilsworth
- 1942/43 Ernest Braddock
- 1943/44 Frederick Mitchell
- 1944/45 Francis Carney
- 1945/46 E. G. Underwood
- 1946/47 Robert Shaw
- 1947/48 John E. Mitchell
- 1948/49 John E. Mitchell
- 1949/50 William Sharp

=== 1950–1959 ===
- 1950/51 Harry O. Emmony
- 1951/52 George H. Wigman
- 1952/53 Leon H. Wilson
- 1953/54 Christopher Coffey
- 1954/55 Sidney Hobson
- 1955/56 Leonard Mitson
- 1956/57 William J. Cox
- 1957/58 William Hickling
- 1958/59 Joseph Littlefair
- 1959/60 John W. Kenyon

=== 1960–1969 ===
- 1960/61 Roland E. Green
- 1961/62 John L. Davies
- 1962/63 Sidney P. Hill
- 1963/64 Cornelius Cameron
- 1964/65 Frank Wootton
- 1965/66 William Derbyshire
- 1966/67 Percy Holland
- 1967/68 Arthur F. Roberts
- 1968/69 Mrs. W.J. Case
- 1969/70 William George Ernest Dyer

=== 1970–1979 ===
- 1970/71 Oscar S. Watkinson
- 1971/72 Ernest Want
- 1972/73 Charles A. Butler
- 1973/74 Eric S. Foster
- 1974/75 Stanley Shelton
- 1975/76 Mrs. I.F. Mathews
- 1976/77 Stanley J. Rushton
- 1977/78 Edwin E. Bateman
- 1978/79 Oscar S. Watkinson
- 1979/80 Dennis C. Birkinshaw

=== 1980–1989 ===
- 1980/81 Thomas S. Wilkins
- 1981/82 Thomas J.Arnold
- 1982/83 Peter Burgess
- 1983/84 Arthur G. Wright
- 1984/85 Mrs.I.F.Matthews
- 1985/86 David Tongue
- 1986/87 Frank Higgins
- 1987/88 Charles A.Clarke
- 1988/89 Martin W. Suthers
- 1989/90 John Riley

=== 1990–1999 ===
- 1990/91 Christopher Gibson
- 1991/92 Alan White
- 1992/93 Malcolm A. Wood
- 1993/94 Mohammed Ibrahim
- 1994/95 Vernon B. Gapper
- 1995/96 Sylvia Parsons
- 1996/97 Barrie Parker
- 1997/98 Roy Greensmith
- 1998/99 Joyce A. Donn
- 1999/2000 Dennis A. Jones

=== 2000–2009 ===
- 2000/01 Ian W. Malcolm
- 2001/02 Roy Greensmith
- 2002/03 Desmond Wilson
- 2003/04 Brent Charlesworth
- 2004/05 John Hartshorne
- 2005/06 Mohammed Munir
- 2006/07 Desmond Wilson
- 2007/08 Mohammed Munir
- 2008/09 Gul Nawaz Khan
- 2009/10 Jeannie Packer

=== 2010–2019 ===
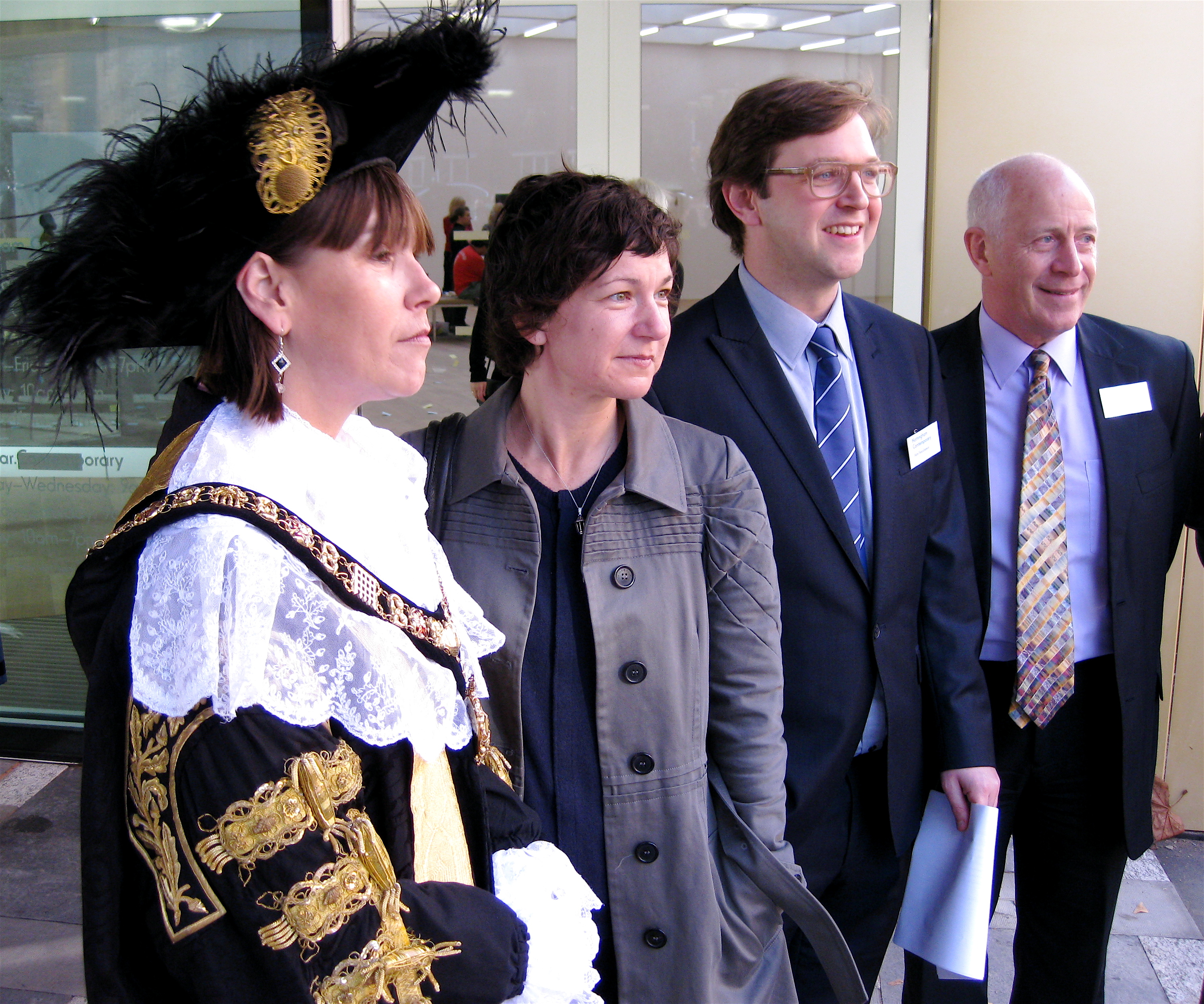
Mayor Jeannie Packer in official dress with guests at Nottingham Contemporary, 2009 .

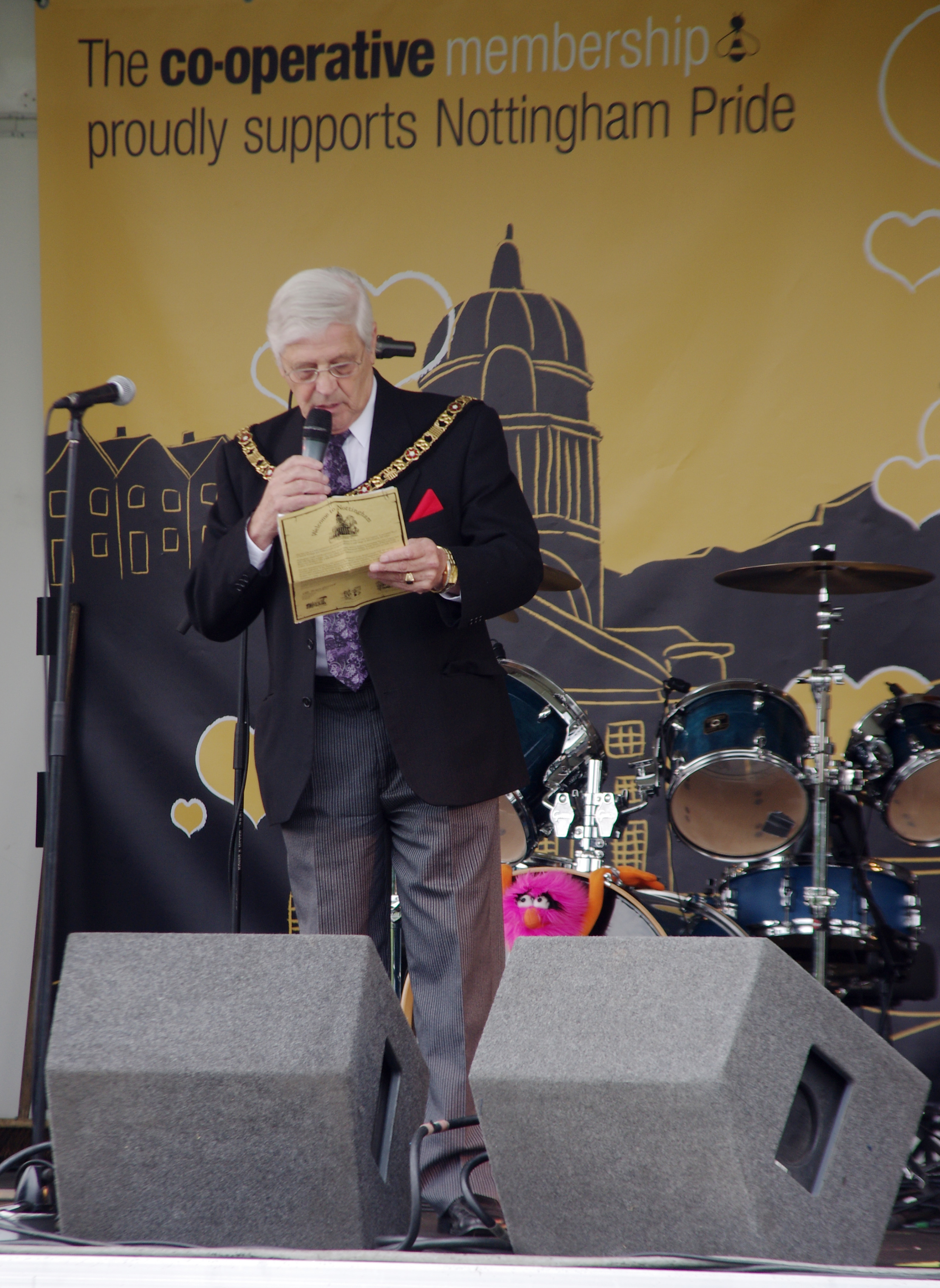
Lord Mayor Brian Grocock opens Nottingham Pride 2010.

- 2010/11 Brian Grocock
- 2011/12 Michael Wildgust
- 2012/13 Leon Unczur
- 2013/14 Merlita Bryan
- 2014/15 Ian Malcolm
- 2015/16 Jackie Morris
- 2016/17 Mohammed Saghir
- 2017/18 Michael Edwards
- 2018/19 Liaqat Ali
- 2019/20 Rosemary Healy

=== 2020–present ===
- 2020/21 Rosemary Healy
- 2021/22 David Trimble
- 2022/23 Wendy Smith
- 2023/25 Carole McCulloch
- 2025/26 Patience Ifediora
- 2026/27 Cheryl Bernard

== See also ==
- Sheriff of Nottingham
- 2007 Nottingham City Council election
- 2011 Nottingham City Council election
- 2015 Nottingham City Council election
- 2019 Nottingham City Council election
