= Swingate, Nottinghamshire =

Village in Nottinghamshire, England

Coordinates: 52.993824°N 1.2557403°W

Swingate
- Village
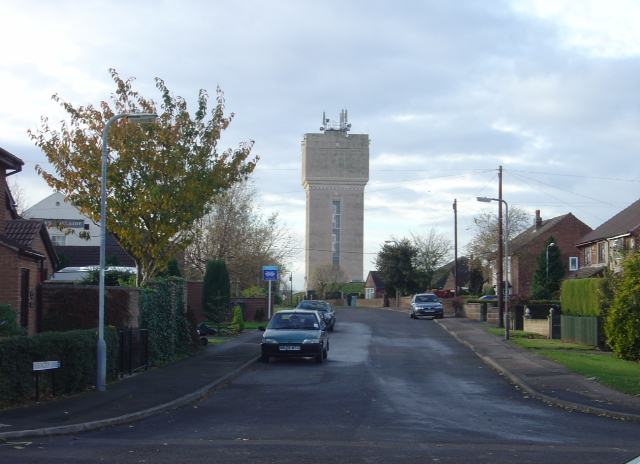
- Swingate Water Tower

- Location within Nottinghamshire
- OS grid reference: SK 50053 44314
- Civil parish: Kimberley
- Shire county: Nottinghamshire
- Region: East Midlands
- Country: England
- Sovereign state: United Kingdom
- Post town: NOTTINGHAM
- Postcode district: NG16
- Police: Nottinghamshire
- Fire: Nottinghamshire
- Ambulance: East Midlands

Swingate is a small English village positioned within Kimberley between Babbington, in the Borough of Broxtowe, in the county of Nottinghamshire. The village has a water tower that is listed, which was opened in 1950 but is now non-operational.

== Education ==
Kimberley Primary School and Nursery is based in Swingate.
