= William Bryan (cricketer) =

English cricketer

Personal information
- Full name: William Bryan
- Born: 22 September 1856; Kimberley, Nottinghamshire, England
- Died: 22 May 1933 (aged 76); Cambridge, Cambridgeshire, England
- Batting: Right-handed
- Bowling: Right-arm medium

Domestic team information
- Years: Team
- 1897–1903: Cambridgeshire

Career statistics
Competition	First-class
Matches	1
Runs scored	11
Batting average	6.50
100s/50s	–/–
Top score	7
Balls bowled	20
Wickets	0
Bowling average	–
5 wickets in innings	–
10 wickets in match	–
Best bowling	–
Catches/stumpings	–/–
- Source: Cricinfo, 31 March 2019

William Bryan (22 September 1856 – 22 May 1933) was an English first-class cricketer.

Byran was born at Kimberley, Nottinghamshire. He made a single appearance in first-class cricket for the South in the North v South fixture of 1886 at Lord's. Batting twice in the match, Bryran was dismissed for 7 runs in the South's first-innings by Frank Shacklock, while following-on in their second-innings he was dismissed for 4 runs by William Cropper. He later played minor counties cricket for Cambridgeshire, making 42 appearances in the Minor Counties Championship between 1897–1903.

He died at Cambridge in May 1933.
