= Thomas North (coal owner) =

Nottinghamshire colliery entrepreneur

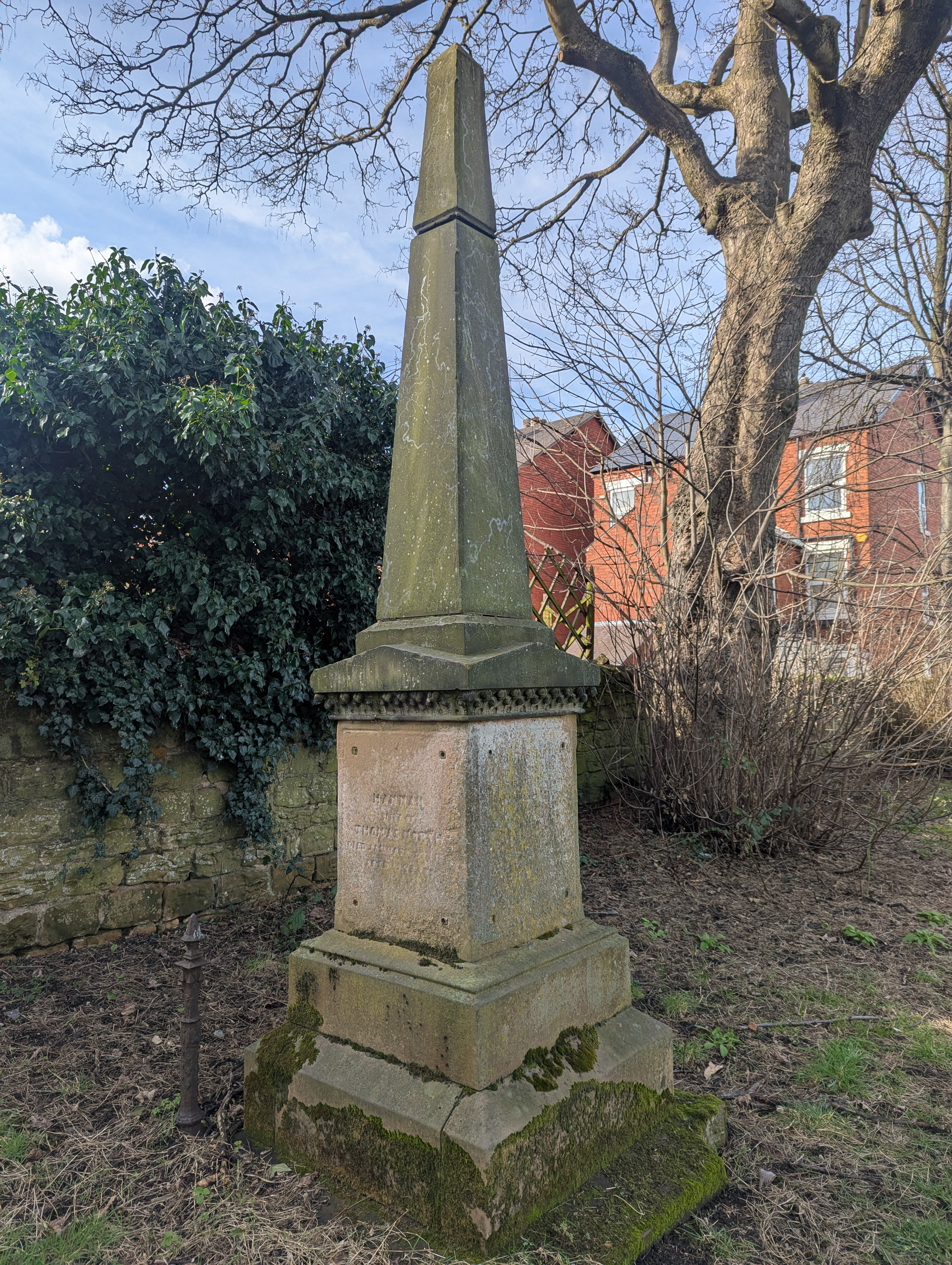
- Thomas North's obelisk in Old Cemetery, Church Street, Old Basford
- Born: 1810/1811; Nottingham
- Died: February 28, 1868 (aged 57); Basford (or London)
- Burial place: Old Basford Cemetery; 52° 58′ 46.08″ N 1° 10′ 48.21″ W
- Monuments: Thomas North's obelisk Marble plaque in Christ Church
- Occupations: Colliery owner, local politician
- Years active: 1832-1868
- Known for: First large-scale coal mine in Nottinghamshire's concealed coalfield, 18 mi (29 km) of private tramways and railways, Christ Church, Cinderhill, "finding employment for a large number of people"
- Notable work: Trackbed of NET branch-line between Babbington Junction and Phoenix Park, especially the cutting between two original bridges
- Political party: Liberal
- Spouse(s): Hannah Laycock (1811/12–1865), Catherine Sarah Stanley (1836/1837-27 August 1920)
- Children: Thomas North III
- Father: Thomas North Sr.

Thomas North was a colliery entrepreneur and local councillor, becoming mayor of Nottingham in 1844 and an alderman in 1859.

North looked after his workforce's interests, building a number of miners' cottages, so he was held in high regard by both workers and the business community.

The miners should go down on their bended knee and thank Mr Thomas North for providing them with such palaces to live in.

— Nottinghamshire Guardian (June, 1856)

== Early life and career on Babbington Moor ==
Not much is known about North's early life. He was possibly born at the Toll House on Nottingham's London Road as the eldest son of toll-gate keeper and mining entrepreneur Thomas North Sr. With Nottingham specializing in producing machine-made lace, the population of Nottingham grew steadily in the 1820s. North's father started making bricks in Mapperley near Nottingham and worked small coal pits on Babbington Moor, south of Kimberley. It's understood that in 1826 Thomas North Sr. borrowed £800 from chemist, Thomas Nunn, but the source of the rest of his capital is a mystery. From 1832 North Jr. stayed at Babbington Cottage and managed the coal mining business on the moor. The mines were run by subcontractors known as 'butties', who hired labour and provided operational funds. Mining methods and equipment were rudimentary, and the working conditions were tough. Thomas North Sr. died around 1833.

North's early coal mines at Babbington were small and technologically backward as were the mines of all other Erewash Valley owners before the 1840s. However, North had been sending his Babbington coals along both the Nottingham and Erewash Canals for some time. During the time of North Sr., a survey in 1827 of the Edge family's Strelley and Bilborough estates shows a tramway from pits in the vicinity of Babbington to the Robbinett's canal arm. In 1835, Sanderson depicted two tramways from the moor: one ran immediately south-westwards to the wharf at Robbinett's, while the other ran first north-west and then south-west to reach the main line of the Nottingham Canal on the south side of the aqueduct at Cossall Marsh. In February 1834 at the instance of the mortgage trustees the remaining 4-and-half years of North's lease on Babbington Moor colliery, described as being in full production of a top quality canal-borne coal and well profitable, together with a desirable mansion, several labourers' cottages and a farm house with fields of meadow and pasture, comprising 83.01 acres (33.59 ha), were advertised for sale by auction. This may have been how North came into partnership with Thomas Wakefield, who came from a wealthy textile family, in 1835. Wakefield's capital injection enabled the partnership to extend its interests closer to Nottingham.

They began constructing private railway, linking all their mines with canals, landsale wharves, and, subsequently, main-line railways. By the end of 1837 their new railway from enlarged pits between Awsworth and Strelley had already reached a landsale wharf at Chilwell Dam. The extension of the line from a locomotive steam engine at Babbington down to a landsale wharf on the Edge property near Cinderhill turnpike gate was confirmed by the plan accompanying North's lease of the Edge coals in June 1838. This was the first railway line in the district to employ steam traction. Consequently, their transport costs were lower than those of their main competitors.

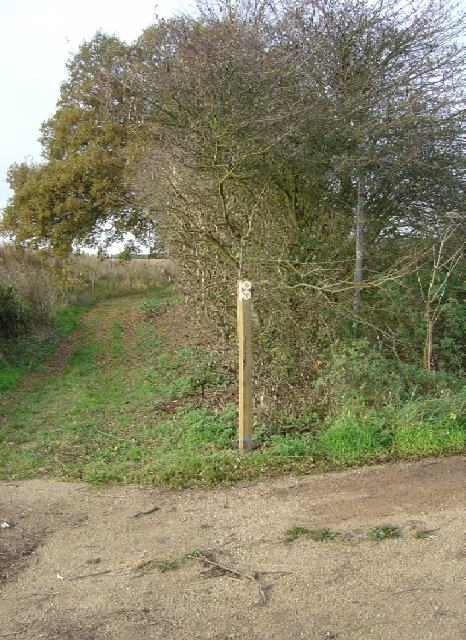
Path at Chilwell Dam in 2007

In 1839, James Morley of Sneinton (the third son of Richard Morley, of hosiery manufacturers, I. & R. Morley) joined North's partnership, then known as the Babbington Coal Company. He contributed funds and worked full-time without a salary. Around this time, North and Wakefield secured mining leases for a large area in northern Nottingham and got busy widening and deepening old mine shafts while excavating new ones. As business grew, the Babbington Coal Company became one of the most threatening independent producers, who were the target of restrictive policies of the Erewash Valley Colliery Owners' Association. Also, it had difficulty in obtaining mineral leases as its main competitors, Barber Walker and Butterley, held extensive leases of minerals both to provide reserves and to keep them out of the hands of competitors.

== Commercial and civic career in Nottingham and Basford ==
Business was doing well, as North could move to the upmarket The Park Estate in Nottingham in 1841. North and his partners embarked on a new and risky adventure.

The coal measures in Nottinghamshire, part of the Yorkshire and East Midlands Coalfield, dip gently eastwards. In the west, the coal measures outcrop and form the exposed coalfield whereas in the east they become ever more deeply buried and the coalfield is said to be concealed. Until the 1840s all the coal mines in Nottinghamshire were located in the exposed coalfield, although the first colliery to work the concealed coalfield was Kimberley, which had been sunk in the 1820s and was leased by North. As it was generally believed that it would be infeasible to mine coal from the concealed measures beneath Permian limestone to the east., the 2,000 sq mi (5,200 km^{2}) of deep coal veins on the Nottinghamshire side of the Erewash were a resource waiting to be exploited. Entrepreneurs saw the possibilities of profit. After taking advice from a mining engineer, J. T. Woodhouse, the Babbington Coal Company leased the newly constructed Cinderhill Colliery, about 3 mi (4.8 km) north of Nottingham. Between 1841 and 1843, North sank twin shafts through the superincumbent Magnesian Limestone to the coal measures. Coal extraction began using the most modern methods and equipment: longwall mining, powerful tandem headstock, iron cables, underground mechanical haulage techniques, efficient furnace ventilation and pumping systems as well as cages fixed in the shafts by guide rods, when other local pits still wound coal in corves swinging on a loose rope. The shafts were even lined with wrought iron 'tubbing' to keep them dry. All this was novel for the district. The colliery would employ more men than any other local mine, and it worked the profitable Top Hard seam. In 1844, North extended his existing private railway from Babbington Moor to transport his coal to the canal wharf at Radford.

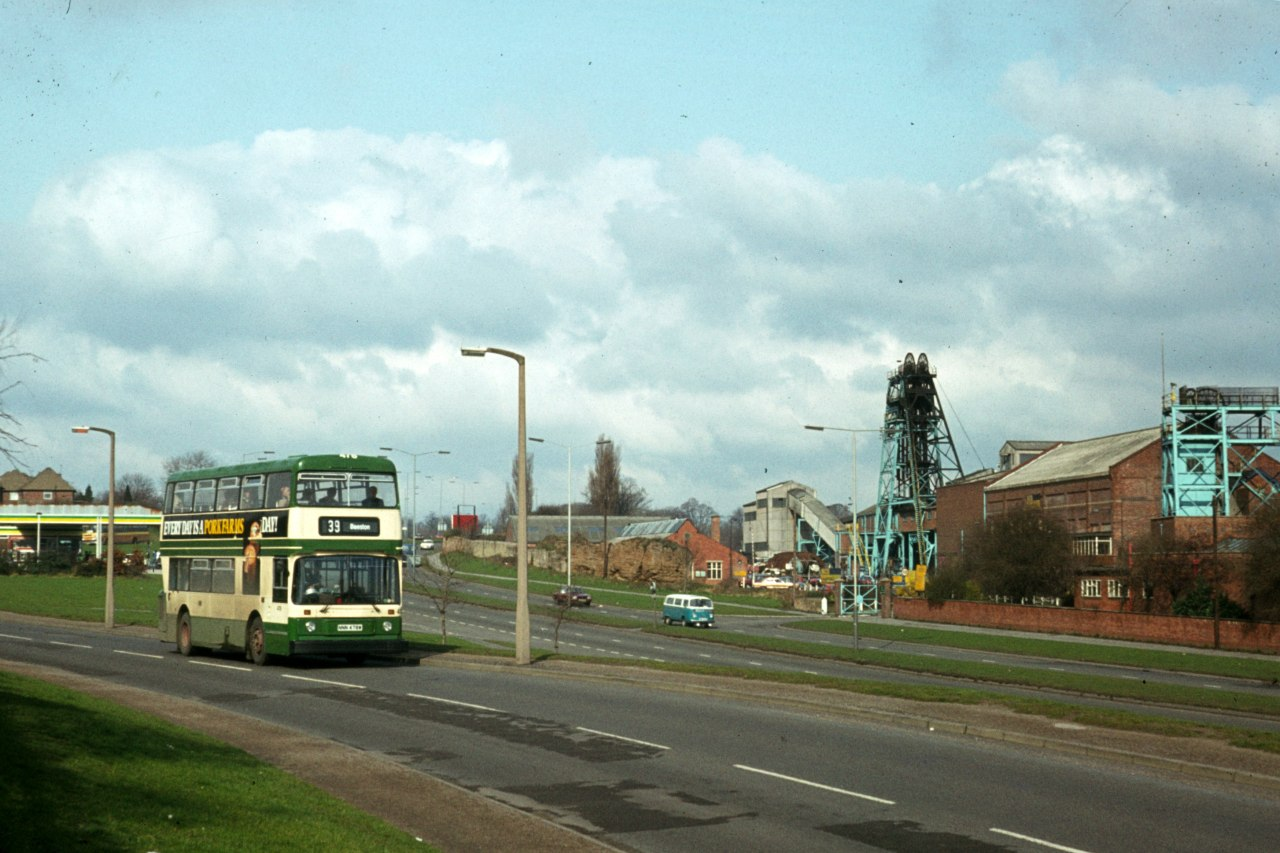
Cinderhill Colliery was still a working colliery in 1983, within the City of Nottingham. To the extreme right can be seen part of the unusual tandem headstock over the more easterly shafts. There was a pair of more traditional headstocks, of which one is also visible.

Unfortunately, in March 1845, a major fault on the east side of the shafts caused production to nearly grind to a halt, and pessimists believed this marked the limit of the coalfield. By repeatedly taking new partners into the Babbington Coal Company, he had kept his business interests alive. In July 1845, a fourth partner, Samuel Parsons, joined the company and agreed to pay £18,000 in instalments for a one-fifth stake in the company. However, North decided to drill through the fault, despite being in financial distress and having nearly given up, in mid-September 1847 he discovered a coal seam and resumed production. Unfortunately, many were left ruined after receiving little or no return on their investment. Wakefield, his main investor, went bankrupt, losing his own money, his late father's estate, and funds entrusted to him by various charities. Compounding North's difficulties was the sense of betrayal felt by Morley. Thus their partnership was terminated and North continued the business as a sole proprietor with the support of the bank I and IC Wright & Co, which was run by second cousins of a partner in Butterley. Wakefield only received £2,000 from North in compensation for his company shares, which was just a small fraction of what he'd invested.

Thomas Wakefield had been the leader of the whiggish Liberal group that controlled the municipal Nottingham Borough Council. Under his influence, North became a councillor in 1837 and served as mayor in 1844/45. North was elected as an alderman in 1859, a position held until his death. However, unlike Wakefield, he wasn't very active in politics and rarely spoke in council. From 1851, he rented Basford Hall from Thomas Webb Edge, subsequently renewing it when the lease on the North's lease of the Edge coal was renewed in 1858. In 1853 North opened his Newcastle Colliery alongside the mineral railway at Whitemoor, together with another one of his notable housing developments, Napoleon Square, above Broxtowe Lane. By 1856 North owned the rights to about 9,500 acres (3,800 ha) of continuous coalfield, centred on the Babbington Coal Company's colliery at Cinderhill, held from the Duke of Newcastle. North had joined the Colliery Owners' Association by 1847 and when the Association's members were facing stiff competition to supply the London market, North initiated legal proceedings in 1859 against the Great Northern Railway Company, who was said to be illegally trading in coal on a large scale.

== Bankruptcy ==
North built several new coal mines similar to Cinderhill in the 1850s and 60s. He also owned the largest brickworks in Nottinghamshire, right next to his Cinderhill Colliery. He set up a gasworks to light up his mines, chapels, and a number of miners' cottages, which he had provided for his staff. He had overextended himself financially, so he and his agent spent much time and effort avoiding creditors. At the time of his death, he owed over £190,000 to Wright's Bank. Ironically, the period from 1871 to 1874 was booming for the coal trade. If he'd survived, North could have paid off his debts and seen a good return on his massive investments.

== Personal life ==
Thomas North married twice. His first wife, Hannah Laycock died in 1865. He then married Catherine Sarah Stanley, who gave birth to a son, also named Thomas, in 1867.

=== Death ===
North died in 1868, either on 28 February in London after fleeing his creditors, or on 28 January at Basford Hall, from hematuria and pulmonary edema, leaving his second wife, Catherine, an estate worth less than £120,000. He was buried in the Old Basford Cemetery, opposite St Leodegarius Church, but owing to his large debts, there was no money for a memorial. Dissatisfied, his former workmen had a collection and erected an obelisk, upon which was inscribed,

By great enterprise he was the means of finding employment for a large number of people who have subscribed to erect this monument to his memory.

— Epitaph on obelisk

There is also a white marble plaque in his memory on the south wall of the nave in Christ Church, Cinderhill.

== Legacy structures and effects ==
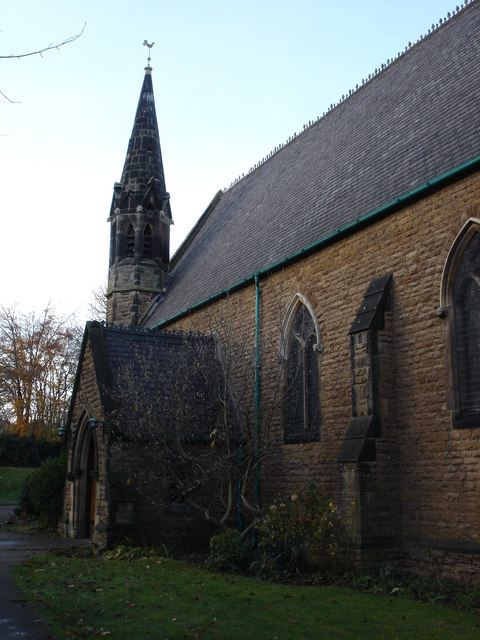
Spire of Christ Church, Cinderhill in 2008

North came from a Baptist background and in 1844 he built a stone chapel for the inhabitants of Babbington village. He also constructed a Baptist mission hall in Cinderhill. Later North became an Anglican and served as a churchwarden at St Leodegarius Church, Basford, for many years. In 1856, he spent £2,000 to establish a daughter church near Cinderhill.

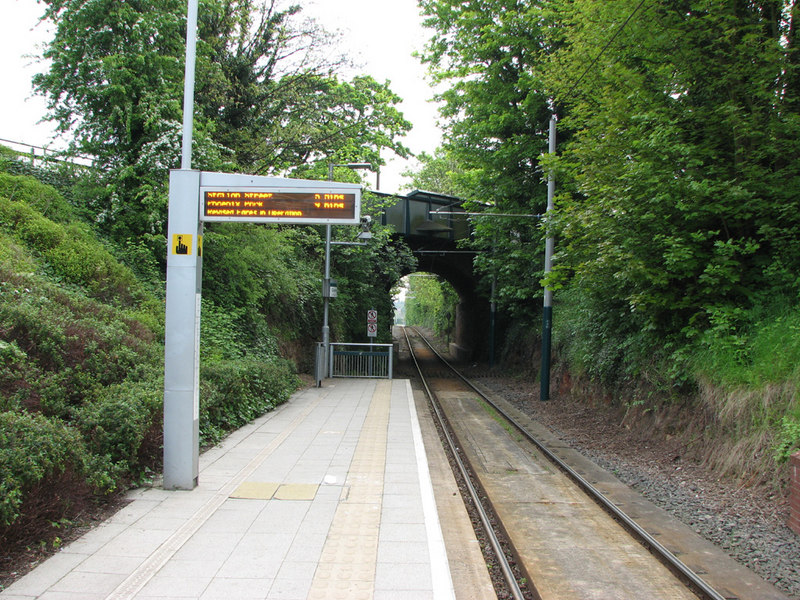
Cinderhill Tram Stop looking along the single line cutting towards Highbury Vale and one of the original bridges

North created a short mineral branch line from Cinderhill Colliery and the adjacent Babbington wharf to the mainline at Basford, which was later purchased by the Midland Railway in 1877. Today, single track branch beyond Babbington Junction, of the Nottingham Express Transit (NET) light rail system, follows the trackbed of North's former railway spur. The line goes through a cutting between two original bridges until it reaches the Phoenix Park tram stop. That tram stop and car park, along with the surrounding business park, are on the site of the former Babbington Colliery at Cinderhill.

North's groundbreaking projects at Cinderhill inspired others to invest in large, well-equipped coal mines to tap into Nottinghamshire's concealed coal seams, which became one of the most profitable coal mining regions in Britain. Despite his flawed character, North's initiative and vision brought prosperity to impoverished agricultural and framework-knitting areas.
