= Babbington =

Hamlet in Nottinghamshire, England

Coordinates: 52.987°N 1.269°W

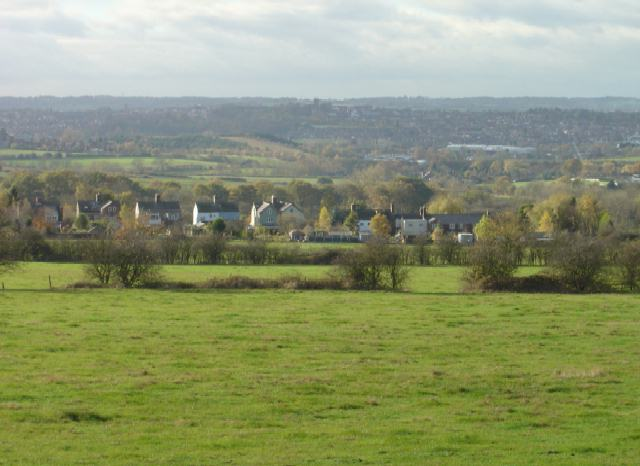

- Location within Nottinghamshire
- OS grid reference: SK4943
- Shire county: Nottinghamshire
- Region: East Midlands
- Country: England
- Sovereign state: United Kingdom
- Police: Nottinghamshire
- Fire: Nottinghamshire
- Ambulance: East Midlands

Babbington is a hamlet in Nottinghamshire, England. It is located 2 miles south of Kimberley, close to the M1 motorway. It is part of Kimberley civil parish.

== Toponymy and early history ==
Babbington is a transferred place-name, one of the few Nottinghamshire toponyms that derive from the family name of an owner or tenant. All those names are of small and unimportant places and are mostly of very late origin. There is documentary evidence for Bab(b)ington Moore twice in the seventeenth century: in a will from 1619 and map from 1630, and Babington in land-transfer proceedings from 1640.

In the fifteenth century land in Awsworth, Kimberley and Grasscroft, which possibly included Babbington, was transferred to the Babingtons of Chilwell. The Chilwell Babingtons' association didn't last long, ending with John Babington in 1501 and the land passed via marriage to Robert Sheffield's descendants.

By 1566, this land had transferred from John Sheffield, 2nd Baron Sheffield to Henry Babington of Dethick. Henry's son and heir was Anthony Babington, who was hanged, drawn and quartered in 1586 for treasonous involvement in the Babington Plot. After the conspirator's execution, some of his property passed to his brother, Francis, but the estate fragmented rapidly. In 1589, a small "part of the inheritance of Anthony his brother", essentially Babbington Moor, was sold to George Talbot, 6th Earl of Shrewsbury. His son, Gilbert Talbot, 7th Earl of Shrewsbury, granted Babbington Moor farm, along with Bolsover Castle and Welbeck Abbey, to his stepbrother and brother-in-law, Charles Cavendish. Cavendish's son, William, who was created Earl of Newcastle in 1628 and Duke of Newcastle upon Tyne in 1665, was shown as owning the land on Babbington Moor on the survey map of 1630, mentioned above.

Until 1848, Babbington Moor was the southern limit of Greasley parish, which was originally the second largest parish in Nottinghamshire, when Kimberley was detached from Greasley as a separate civil and ecclesiastical parish.

== Coal mining ==
In the early nineteenth century Thomas North Sr. was working small coal pits on Babbington Moor. In 1826 he borrowed £800 from chemist, Thomas Nunn. The collieries at Babbington were in the possession of Gervas Bourne, when Thomas North Sr. died in 1830. Bourne could only pay off partly his debt to North's estate, by disposing of these collieries. In 1830, one of North's largest creditors, Thomas Wakefield, entered into a partnership with Thomas North Jr. to purchase and exploit these collieries. From 1832, Thomas North Jr. stayed at Babbington Cottage and managed the coal mining business on the moor. The mines were run by subcontractors known as 'butties', who hired labour and provided operational funds. Mining methods and equipment were rudimentary, and the working conditions were tough. In February 1834 the Babbington Moor colliery was described in an auction advert, as being in full production of a top quality canal-borne coal and well profitable, together with a desirable mansion, several labourers' cottages and a farm house with fields of meadow and pasture, comprising 83.01 acres (33.59 ha).

== Tramways and railways ==
The Norths' early coal mines at Babbington were small and technologically backward, as were the mines of all other Erewash Valley owners before the 1840s. North had been sending his Babbington coals along both the Nottingham and Erewash Canals for some time. During the time of North Sr., a survey in 1827 of the Edge family's Strelley and Bilborough estates shows a tramway from pits in the vicinity of Babbington to the Robbinett's arm of the Nottingham Canal. In 1835, Sanderson depicted two tramways from the moor: one ran immediately south-westwards to the wharf at Robbinett's, while the other ran first north-west and then south-west to reach the main line of the Nottingham Canal on the south side of the aqueduct at Cossall Marsh. Capital injected by Wakefield enabled the partnership to extend its interests closer to Nottingham. They began constructing private railway, linking all their mines with canals, landsale wharves, and, subsequently, main-line railways. By the end of 1837 their new railway from enlarged pits between Awsworth and Strelley had already reached a landsale wharf at Chilwell Dam. The extension of the line from a locomotive steam engine at Babbington down to a landsale wharf on the Edge property near Cinderhill turnpike gate was confirmed by the plan accompanying North's lease of the Edge coals in June 1838. This was the first railway line in the district to employ steam traction.

All the local tramway lines were eventually lifted. A few traces of the former rail network still exist, mostly as footpaths. However, freedom of access to the village along the course of the railway was denied by the landowners to the public and inhabitants. Since this applies to vehicular traffic between the village and Swingate to the east, other than for pedestrians there is no right of access across the moor between these two villages.

== Chapel ==
A Baptist chapel used to be located here. The stone chapel was built in 1844 by local coal owner Thomas North for the inhabitants of the district. It was reputedly a venue for runaway marriages. The chapel closed about 1920, was a ruined shell by 1950 and had been demolished by 1969.

== Notable residents ==
- Thomas North, colliery entrepreneur, lived at Babbington Cottage from 1832 to 1841.
- Samuel Chambers, unjustly transported convict, had worked at the colliery and was resident in 1834.
