= Thomas North (antiquary) =

English antiquarian

- Born: 24 January 1830; Melton Mowbray, Leicestershire
- Died: 27 February 1884 (aged 54); Llanfairfechan
- Occupations: Antiquarian and campanologist

Thomas North (24 January 1830 – 27 February 1884) was an English antiquarian and campanologist.

== Biography ==
North was the son of Thomas North of Burton End, Melton Mowbray, Leicestershire, by his wife, Mary Raven. He was born at Melton Mowbray on 24 January 1830. He was educated at the grammar school of his native town. Upon leaving school, he entered the office of Mr. Woodcock, a solicitor at Melton Mowbray, but presently gave up the law, removed to Leicester, and entered Paget's bank there. Here he remained until 1872, when failing health compelled him to retire to Ventnor. North was elected a fellow of the Society of Antiquaries in 1875. In 1881, he removed to the Plâs, Llanfairfechan, where he resided until his death on 27 February 1884. He married, on 23 May 1860, Fanny, daughter of Richard Luck of Leicester, by whom he had an only son. The Leicestershire Architectural and Archæological Society erected to his memory a brass tablet in the church of St. Martin, Leicester.

From an early age, North was a student of archæology and antiquities. In 1861, he was elected honorary secretary of the Leicestershire Architectural and Archæological Society, and he edited all its ‘Transactions’ and papers from that time until his death, himself contributing upwards of thirty papers. Among the most important of these were ‘Tradesmen's Tokens issued in Leicestershire,’ ‘The Mowbrays, Lords of Melton,’ ‘The Constables of Melton,’ ‘Leicester Ancient Stained Glass,’ ‘The Letters of Alderman Robert Heyricke,’ &c. Eight of these papers relate to his native town, of which he projected a history, although he never lived to complete it. His earliest and perhaps best known book was ‘A Chronicle of the Church of St. Martin in Leicester during the Reigns of Henry VIII, Edward VI, Mary, and Elizabeth, with some Account of its minor Altars and ancient Guilds,’ 1866, a work of learning and research, which has been referred to in several ecclesiastical suits. In later life, he made campanology his special study, and brought out in rapid succession a series of monographs on the church bells of various counties, other volumes being in preparation at the time of his death.

North's works are: 1. ‘A Chronicle of the Church of St. Martin in Leicester,’ &c., 1866, referred to above. 2. ‘The Church Bells of Leicestershire: their Inscriptions, Traditions, and peculiar Uses, with Chapters on Bells and the Leicester Bell Founders,’ 1876. 3. ‘The Church Bells of Northamptonshire,’ 1878. 4. ‘The Church Bells of Rutland,’ 1880. 5. ‘The Church Bells of Lincolnshire,’ 1882. 6. ‘The Church Bells of Bedfordshire,’ 1883. 7. ‘The Accounts of the Churchwardens of St. Martin's, Leicester, 1489–1844,’ 1884. 8. ‘The Church Bells of Hertfordshire,’ 1887, edited, after North's decease, from his materials by J. C. L. Stahlschmidt. He also edited the first five volumes of the ‘Leicestershire Architectural and Archæological Society's Transactions,’ and the Leicestershire section of vols. vi. to xvii. of the ‘Associated Architectural Societies' Reports and Papers.’
