= Babbington Colliery =

Coal mine in Nottinghamshire, England

- Location in Nottinghamshire
- Location: City of Nottingham, Nottinghamshire, England; 52.988841°N 1.206683°W
- Products: Coal
- Opened: 1841
- Closed: 1986

Babbington colliery, which was adjacent to Cinderhill Colliery, was a coal mine in Cinderhill, Nottinghamshire, England. The mine opened in 1841, and was the first large-scale coal mine in the county. It took its name from its original owner, the Babbington Coal Company, founded in 1839 to work shallow mines near Babbington, a hamlet some 2.5 miles (4.0 km) to the west of the later colliery. Babbington Colliery had a long life.

By 1982 Babbington was the oldest working colliery, with an expected remaining life of nine years, and the worst financial loss-maker in the Nottinghamshire coalfield. In the year 1981-82, the colliery recorded a loss of £20.6 million, greater than all the rest of the Nottinghamshire coalfield. The National Coal Board had proposed in 1981 to link up Babbington with Hucknall Colliery to form a Hucknall-Babbington Complex. Owing to its proximity to Junction 26 of the M1 motorway, during 1984–1985 United Kingdom miners' strike, Babbington Colliery was one of the Nottinghamshire collieries the hardest hit by picketing. Early on a Babbington National Union of Mineworkers spokesman said, "...this picketing is likely to put the men against a strike." The police attempted to protect working miners from aggressive picketing, notably in April and July 1984. After its formation, the Hucknall-Babbington complex closed in September 1986.

The site is now the location of a business park, and the Phoenix Park tram terminus of the Nottingham Express Transit. It lies within the current boundaries of the City of Nottingham. The Phoenix Park branch of the Nottingham Express Transit uses the route of the Cinderhill Colliery Railway that linked the colliery to the wider railway network.
