= Oxford period poetry anthologies =

These are Oxford poetry anthologies of English poetry, which select from a given period. See also The Oxford Book of Twentieth Century English Verse and Eighteenth century women poets: an Oxford anthology.

== New Oxford Book of Seventeenth-Century Verse (1991) ==
Edited by Alastair Fowler. Poets included:

Henry Aldrich – Sir William Alexander, Earl of Stirling – Jacob Allestry – Mary Astell – William Austin – Sir Robert Ayton – William Basse – Richard Baxter – Francis Beaumont – Sir John Beaumont – Joseph Beaumont – Thomas Beedome – Aphra Behn – Edward Benlowes – Henry Bold – Anne Bradstreet – Richard Brathwait – Alexander Brome – Sir Thomas Browne – William Browne of Tavistock – John Bunyan – Robert Burton – Samuel Butler – Thomas Campian – Thomas Carew – James Carkesse – William Cartwright – Patrick Cary – Margaret Cavendish, Duchess of Newcastle – William Cavendish, Duke of Newcastle – John Chalkhill – William Chamberlayne – George Chapman – John Cleveland – John Collop – Richard Corbett – Charles Cotton – Abraham Cowley – Richard Crashaw – Hugh Crompton – John Cutts, Lord Cutts – Alicia D'Anvers – Thomas D'Urfey – John Dancer – George Daniel – Samuel Daniel – Sir William Davenant – Robert Davenport – Thomas Dekker – Sir John Denham – John Digby, Earl of Bristol – John Donne – Michael Drayton – William Drummond of Hawthornden – John Dryden – Richard Duke – 'Ephelia' – Sir George Etherege – Mary Evelyn – Thomas Fairfax, Lord Fairfax – Mildmay Fane, Earl of Westmorland – Sir Richard Fanshawe – Henry Farley – George Farquhar – Owen Feltham – Anne Finch, Countess of Winchilsea – Thomas Flatman – Richard Flecknoe – Giles Fletcher – John Fletcher – Phineas Fletcher – John Ford – Simon Ford – Thomas Forde – Sidney Godolphin – James Graham, Marquis of Montrose – Fulke Greville, Lord Brooke – William Habington – Henry Hall – John Hall – Henry Halswell – William Hammond – Samuel Harding – Sir John Harington – Christopher Harvey – Sir R. Hatton – Robert Hayman – Robert Heath – Edward Herbert, Lord Herbert of Cherbury – George Herbert – Robert Herrick – Thomas Heyrick – Thomas Heywood – N. Hookes – John Hoskyns – Anne Howard – Sir Robert Howard – James Howell – Sir Francis Hubert – Lucy Hutchinson – Thomas James – Ben Jonson – Thomas Ken – Anne Killigrew – Thomas Killigrew – King James VI and I – Henry King – Ralph Knevet – Sir Francis Kynaston – Sir Roger L'Estrange – Emilia Lanier – Richard Leigh – Martin Lluelyn – Richard Lovelace – Andrew Marvell – Thomas Middleton – John Milton – Mary Mollineux – Henry More – Thomas Morton – Pierre Antoine Motteux – Nicholas Murford – Thomas Nabbes – John Norris – Dudley North, Lord North – John Oldham – Philip Pain – Clement Paman – Martin Parker – Francis Daniel Pastorius – Thomas Philipott – Katherine Philips – Alexander Pope – Walter Pope – Samuel Pordage – Edmund Prestwich – Laurence Price – Francis Quarles – Alexander Radcliffe – Thomas Randolph – Edward Ravenscroft – Eldred Revett – Henry Reynolds – Samuel Rowlands – Joseph Rutter – Charles Sackville, Earl of Dorset – George Sandys – Sir Charles Sedley – William Shakespeare – Sir Edward Sherburne – Thomas Shipman – James Shirley – Thomas Southerne – Thomas Stanley – Matthew Stevenson – Sir John Stradling – William Strode – Sir John Suckling – Joshua Sylvester – Lady Elizabeth Tanfield – Nahum Tate – John Tatham – Edward Taylor – John Taylor – Elizabeth Thomas – Elizabeth Tipper – Benjamin Tompson – Aurelian Townsend – Thomas Traherne – Henry Vaughan – George Villiers, Duke of Buckingham – Luke Wadding – Edmund Waller – Rowland Watkyns – John Webster – Anne Wharton – Robert Wild – Roger Williams – Humphrey Willis – John Wilmot, Earl of Rochester – Gerrard Winstanley – George Wither – William Wood – Sir Henry Wotton – James Wright – Lady Mary Wroth

== New Oxford Book of Eighteenth-Century Verse (1984) ==
Edited by Roger Lonsdale. Poets included:

Jean Adams – Joseph Addison – John Aikin – Mark Akenside – Mary Alcock – Robert Andrews – Christopher Anstey – John Armstrong – Joanna Baillie – Henry Baker – John Codrington Bampfylde – John Bancks – Anna Laetitia Barbauld – Mary Barber – James Beattie – George Berkeley – Isaac Bickerstaffe – Samuel Bishop – James Bisset – Robert Blair – William Blake – Susanna Blamire – Samuel Bowden – William Lisle Bowles – James Bramston – Andrew Brice – Henry Brooke – John Brown – Isaac Hawkins Browne – Moses Browne – Michael Bruce – John Frederick Bryant – Sir Samuel Egerton Brydges – Robert Burns – John Byrom – George Canning – Henry Carey – John Carr – James Cawthorn – Thomas Chatterton – Edward Chicken – Lady Mary Chudleigh – Charles Churchill – Colley Cibber – Thomas Cole – John Collier – Mary Collier – Emanuel Collins – William Collins – George Colman the younger – William Congreve – Joseph Cottle – William Cowper – George Crabbe – William Crowe – Samuel Croxall – John Cunningham – Sir George Dallas – John Dalton – James Dance – Erasmus Darwin – Sneyd Davies – Daniel Defoe – William Diaper – Charles Dibdin – Sarah Dixon – John Dobson – Philip Doddridge – Robert Dodsley – E. Dower – Lord Dreghorn – Stephen Duck – William Dunkin – Thomas D'Urfey – John Dyer – Thomas Edwards – Sarah Fyge Egerton – John Ellis – George Farewell – Joseph Fawcett – Francis Fawkes – Robert Fergusson – Frederick Forrest – John Freeth – George Galloway – John Gambold – Edmund Gardner – David Garrick – John Gay – John Gerrard – Thomas Gilbert – Richard Glover – Oliver Goldsmith – James Graeme – James Grainger – Richard Graves – Thomas Gray – Matthew Green – Frances Greville – Laurence Hynes Halloran – William Harrison – Francis Hawling – John Hawthorn – Samuel Henley – Aaron Hill – Thomas Holcroft – Leonard Howard – Hildebrand Jacob – Richard Jago – Nicholas James – Catherine Jemmat – Charles Jenner – Soames Jenyns – Samuel Johnson – George Keate – James Kennedy – L. Ker – William King – John Langhorne – Mary Leapor – John Learmont – Lady Anne Lindsay – Edward Littleton – Evan Lloyd – Robert Lloyd – Andrew Macdonald – John Maclaurin, Lord Dreghorn – James Macpherson – David Mallet – Bernard Mandeville – William Mason – Joseph Mather – Thomas Mathison – Thomas Maurice – Robert Merry – William Julius Mickle – Mary Monck – Lady Mary Wortley Montagu – Charles Mordaunt, 3rd Earl of Peterborough – Hannah More – Charles Morris – Thomas Morris – Thomas Moss – Thomas Mozeen – Charles Newton – John Newton – Robert Nugent, Earl Nugent – John O'Keefe – Richardson Pack – Thomas Parnell – John Parrish – William Parsons – Alexander Pennecuik – Thomas Penrose – Thomas Percy – Ambrose Philips – John Philips – Christopher Pitt – Annabella Plumptre – John Plumtre – Richard Polwhele – John Pomfret – Alexander Pope – Kenrick Prescot – Matthew Prior – Henry James Pye – Richard Savage – John Scott of Amwell – Anna Seward – William Shenstone – William Shepherd – Richard Brinsley Sheridan – Christopher Smart – Charlotte Turner Smith – George Smith – John Smith – Tobias Smollett – William Somervile – William Sotheby – Robert Southey – Lawrence Spooner – Philip Dormer Stanhope, Earl of Chesterfield – George Alexander Stevens – Jonathan Swift – Robert Tatersal – Henry Taylor – John Taylor – William Taylor – John Thelwall – Edward Thompson – James Thomson – Thomas Tickell – Elizabeth Tollet – Augustus Montagu Toplady – Horace Walpole, Earl of Orford – Edward Ward – Joseph Warton – Thomas Warton – Isaac Watts – James Eyre Weeks – Leonard Welsted – Charles Wesley – John Wesley – Samuel Wesley – Phillis Wheatley – Gilbert White – Paul Whitehead – William Whitehead – J. Wilde – Sir Charles Hanbury Williams – John Williams – Anne Finch, Countess of Winchilsea – John Winstanley – John Wolcot – James Woodhouse – Charles Woodward – William Woty – Hetty Wright – John Wright – Ann Yearsley – Edward Young

== New Oxford Book of Romantic Period Verse (1993) ==
Edited by Jerome J. McGann. Poets included:

Miles Peter Andrews – Joanna Baillie – Samuel Bamford – Anna Laetitia Barbauld – Thomas Beck – William Blake – William Lisle Bowles – Robert Burns – George Gordon, Lord Byron – Thomas Campbell – George Canning – John Clare – Samuel Taylor Coleridge – Hannah Cowley – William Cowper – George Crabbe – George Croly – William Crowe – Charlotte Dacre – George Darley – Erasmus Darwin – Ebenezer Elliott – Catherine Maria Fanshawe – John Hookham Frere – William Gifford – Felicia Dorothea Hemans – James Hogg – William Hone – Thomas Hood – Leigh Hunt – Sir William Jones – John Keats – Charles Lamb – Mary Lamb – Laetitia Elizabeth Landon – Walter Savage Landor – Joseph Lees – Matthew Gregory Lewis – Charles Lloyd (poet) – Henry Luttrell – John Herman Merivale – Robert Merry – Mary Russell Mitford – James Montgomery – Thomas Moore – John Moultrie – Caroline Oliphant – Amelia Opie – Sydney Owenson – William Parsons – Thomas Love Peacock – Richard Polwhele – Winthrop Mackworth Praed – William Probert – Bryan Waller Procter – Edward Quillinan – Ann Radcliffe – Mary Robinson – Samuel Rogers – William Roscoe – Thomas Russell – Walter Scott – Anna Seward – Percy Bysshe Shelley – Charlotte Turner Smith – Horace Smith – James Smith – Robert Southey – Thomas Tod Stoddart – Ann Taylor – Jane Taylor – William Taylor – William Tennant – Alfred Tennyson – John Thelwall – Mary Tighe – Helen Maria Williams – John Wolcot – Charles Wolfe – William Wordsworth – Ann Yearsley

== Oxford Book of Victorian Verse (1922) ==
Edited by Arthur Quiller-Couch; he included many poems that he had already selected for the Oxford Book of English Verse.

Lascelles Abercrombie – Percy Addleshaw – Douglas Ainslie – Thomas Bailie Aldrich – William Alexander – William Allingham – Sir Edwin Arnold – Matthew Arnold – Thomas Ashe – Alfred Austin – William Edmonstoune Aytoun – Philip James Bailey – Richard Harris Barham – Maurice Baring – George Barlow – Jane Barlow – William Barnes – Benjamin Disraeli, 1st Earl of Beaconsfield – Thomas Lovell Beddoes – Henry Charles Beeching – Charles Dent Bell – Hilaire Belloc – Arthur Christopher Benson – Laurence Binyon – John Stuart Blackie – Richard Doddridge Blackmore – Mathilde Blind – Wilfrid Scawen Blunt – George Henry Boker – Gordon Bottomley – Francis William Bourdillon – Robert Bridges – Emily Brontë – Rupert Brooke – Robert Barnabas Brough – Oliver Madox Brown – Thomas Edward Brown – Elizabeth Barrett Browning – Robert Browning – William Cullen Bryant – Robert Buchanan – Arthur Gray Butler – Wathen Mark Wilks Call – Thomas Carlyle – Bliss Carman – John Clare – Caroline Clive – Arthur Hugh Clough – Hartley Coleridge – Mary E. Coleridge – Sara Coleridge – Mortimer Collins – Frances Cornford – William Cory – Frances Burdett Money Coutts – Dinah Maria Craik – Walter Crane – Marquess of Crewe – Arthur Shearly Cripps – Henry Cust – George Darley – John Davidson – William H. Davies – Thomas Osborne Davis – William James Dawson – Walter De la Mare – Lord De Tabley – Sir Aubrey De Vere – Aubrey De Vere – Emily Dickinson – Richard Watson Dixon – Bertram Dobell – Sydney Dobell – Austin Dobson – Alfred Domett – Lord Alfred Douglas – Edward Dowden – Ernest Dowson – Sir Francis Hastings Doyle – John Drinkwater – Agnes Mary Frances Duclaux – Helen, Lady Dufferin – George Louis Palmella Busson du Maurier – Matilda Betham Edwards – George Eliot – Ebenezer Elliott – Henry Ellison – Ralph Waldo Emerson – Frederick William Faber – Sir Samuel Ferguson – Michale Field – Edward Fitzgerald – James Elroy Flecker – Alice Furlong – Norman Gale – Richard Garnett – Wilfrid Wilson Gibson – Adam Lindsay Gordon – Edmund Gosse – Charles Granville – David Gray – Dora Greenwell – Gerald Griffin – Louise Imogen Guiney – Fitz-Greene Halleck – Thomas Hardy – Bret Harte – Robert Stephen Hawker – William Ernest Henley – Maurice Hewlett – Emily Henrietta Hickey – Katharine Tynan Hinkson – Oliver Wendell Holmes – Thomas Hood – George Hookham – Gerard Manley Hopkins – Richard Henry Horne – Lord Houghton – Laurence Housman – Julia Ward Howe – William Dean Howells – Leigh Hunt – Douglas Hyde – Jean Ingelow – Lionel Johnson – Ebenezer Jones – Ernest Charles Jones – James Joyce – John Keble – Frances Anne Kemble – Henry Clarence Kendall – John Kenyon – Charles Kingsley – Henry Kingsley – Rudyard Kipling – Walter Savage Landor – Andrew Lang – Emily Lawless – Eugene Lee-Hamilton – Edward Cracroft Lefroy – Richard Le Gallienne – Amy Levy – William James Linton – Frederick Locker-Lampson – John Gibson Lockhart – Henry Wadsworth Longfellow – James Russell Lowell – Henry Dawson Lowry – Sir Alfred Comyn Lyall – Thomas Toke Lynch – Sidney Royse Lysaght – Earl of Lytton – Lord Lytton – Lord Macaulay – Denis Florence MacCarthy – George MacDonald – Charles Mackay – H. C. Compton Mackenzie – Francis Mahony – James Clarence Mangan – Philip Bourke Marston – Theophile Marzials – John Masefield – Gerald Massey – Annie Matheson – George Meredith – Herman Charles Merivale – Alice Meynell – Richard Middleton – William Cosmo Monkhouse – Harold Monro – Mary Montgomerie – T. Sturge Moore – Sir Lewis Morris – William Morris – Neil Munro – Ernest Myers – Frederic William Henry Myers – John Mason Neale – Henry Newbolt – John Henry Newman – John Nicol – Roden Berkeley Wriothesley Noel – Caroline Elizabeth Sarah Norton – Alfred Noyes – Moira O'Neill – John Boyle O'Reilly – Arthur William Edgar O'Shaughnessy – Francis Turner Palgrave – Sir Gilbert Parker – Fanny Parnell – Coventry Patmore – John Payne – John Swinnerton Phillimore – Stephen Phillips – Eden Phillpotts – William Philpot – Edgar Allan Poe – Walter Herries Pollock – Ezra Pound – Winthrop Mackworth Praed – May Probyn – Adelaide Anne Procter – Bryan Waller Procter – Sir Arthur Quiller-Couch – Ernest Radford – William Brighty Rands – Hardwick Drummond Rawnsley – Ernest Rhys – James Logie Robertson – Sir James Rennell Rodd – Samuel Rogers – T. W. Rolleston – William Caldwell Roscoe – William Stanley Roscoe – Christina Georgina Rossetti – Dante Gabriel Rossetti – Earl of Rosslyn – John Ruskin – George William Russell – Lady Margaret Sackville – George Santayana – William Bell Scott – John Campbell Shairp – William Sharp – Dora Sigerson Shorter – Joseph Skipsey – Douglas Brook Wheelton Sladen – Menella Bute Smedley – Alexander Smith – Walter C. Smith – James Stephens – Robert Louis Stevenson – Charles Swain – Elinor Sweetman – Algernon Charles Swinburne – John Addington Symonds – Arthur Symons – John M. Synge – Sir Henry Taylor – Rachel Annand Taylor – Frederick Tennyson – Lord Tennyson – William Makepeace Thackeray – Francis Thompson – Edward William Thomson – James Thomson (B.V.) – Henry David Thoreau – Wilfrid Thorley – Walter Thornbury – John Todhunter – Archbishop Trench – Herbert Trench – Charles Tennyson Turner – Samuel Waddington – Thomas Wade – Edward Walsh – Thomas Herbert Warren – Rosamund Marriott Watson – William Watson – Theodore Watts-Dunton – Augusta Webster – Thomas Westwood – Charles Whitehead – Walt Whitman – John Greenleaf Whittier – Oscar Wilde – Sarah Williams – Nathaniel Parker Lewis – Margaret L. Woods – Thomas Woolner – William Butler Yeats

== New Oxford Book of Victorian Verse (1987) ==
Edited by Christopher Ricks. Poets included:

William Allingham – Matthew Arnold – Thomas Ashe – Henry Bellyse Baildon – William Barnes – Aubrey Beardsley – Thomas Lovell Beddoes – Hilaire Belloc – J. Stanyan Bigg – Robert Bridges – Charlotte Brontë – Emily Jane Brontë – Shirley Brooks – T. E. Brown – Elizabeth Barrett Browning – Robert Browning – C. S. Calverley – William Canton – Lewis Carroll – John Clare – Arthur Hugh Clough – Mary E. Coleridge – Mortimer Collins – William Cory – John Davidson – Lord de Tabley – Charles Dickens – Richard Watson Dixon – Sydney Dobell – Digby Mackworth Dolben – Edward Dowden – Ernest Dowson – R. E. Egerton Warburton – George Eliot – Ebenezer Elliott – Sebastian Evans – Michael Field – Edward FitzGerald – John Gray – Dora Greenwell – Louisa S. Guggenberger – Thomas Hardy – Robert Stephen Hawker – William Ernest Henley – Henry James – Thomas Hood – Gerard M. Hopkins – A. E. Housman – Leigh Hunt – Jean Ingelow – Lionel Johnson – Ebenezer Jones – Ernest Jones – E. Keary – Charles Kingsley – Rudyard Kipling – Walter Savage Landor – Andrew Lang – Edward Lear – Eugene Lee-Hamilton – Amy Levy – Frederick Locker-Lampson – Thomas Babington Macaulay – George MacDonald – William Hurrell Mallock – James Clarence Mangan – Philip Bourke Marston – Gerald Massey – George Meredith – Alice Meynell – William Miller – Cosmo Monkhouse – William Morris – Arthur Munby – E. Nesbit – John Henry Newman – Coventry Patmore – T. L. Peacock – Victor Plarr – Winthrop Mackworth Praed – Adelaide Anne Procter – Dollie Radford – William Renton – James Logie Robertson – A. Mary F. Robinson – Christina G. Rossetti – Dante Gabriel Rossetti – John Ruskin – William Bell Scott – Dora Sigerson Shorter – Elizabeth Siddal – George Augustus Simcox – G. R. Sims – Joseph Skipsey – J. K. Stephen – Robert Louis Stevenson – William Frederick Stevenson – Algernon Charles Swinburne – John Addington Symonds – Arthur Symons – Alfred Tennyson – Frederick Tennyson – William Makepeace Thackeray – Francis Thompson – James Thomson – Charles Tennyson Turner – Katharine Tynan – William Watson – Oscar Wilde – William Wordsworth – W. B. Yeats

== British Poetry and Prose 1870-1905 (1987) ==
Edited by Ian Fletcher. Poets included:

Sir Edwin Arnold – Alfred Austin – Aubrey Beardsley – Robert Bridges – Edward Carpenter – Mary Coleridge – John Davidson – Austin Dobson – Digby Mackworth Dolben – Edward Dowden – Ernest Dowson – Mary Duclaux – Edwin John Ellis – Michael Field – Richard Le Gallienne – Sir W. S. Gilbert – Sir Edmund Gosse – John Gray – William Ernest Henley – Ellice Hopkins – Gerard Manley Hopkins – A. E. Housman – Lionel Johnson – Rudyard Kipling – Andrew Lang – Eugene Lee-Hamilton – Alfred Lyall – Charlotte Mew – Alice Meynell – A. C. Miall – Sir Henry Newbolt – Roden Noel – Arthur O'Shaughnessy – William James Renton – T. W. Rolleston – George William Russell – William Sharp – J. K. Stephen – Algernon Charles Swinburne – John Addington Symonds – Arthur Symons – Lord De Tabley – James Thomson (B.V.) – Francis Thompson – Margaret Veley – Sir William Watson – Augusta Webster – Oscar Wilde – W. B. Yeats

Also, prose by: Sir Max Beerbohm – Samuel Erewhon Butler – Hubert Crackanthorpe – Richard Garnett – Sir W. S. Gilbert – George Gissing – Walter Pater – Richard Jefferies – Rudyard Kipling – George Moore – Arthur Morrison – Olive Schreiner – Robert Louis Stevenson – H. G. Wells
