= 1808 in poetry =

This article covers 1808 in poetry. Nationality words link to articles with information on the nation's poetry or literature (for instance, Irish or France).

== Works published in English ==
=== United Kingdom ===
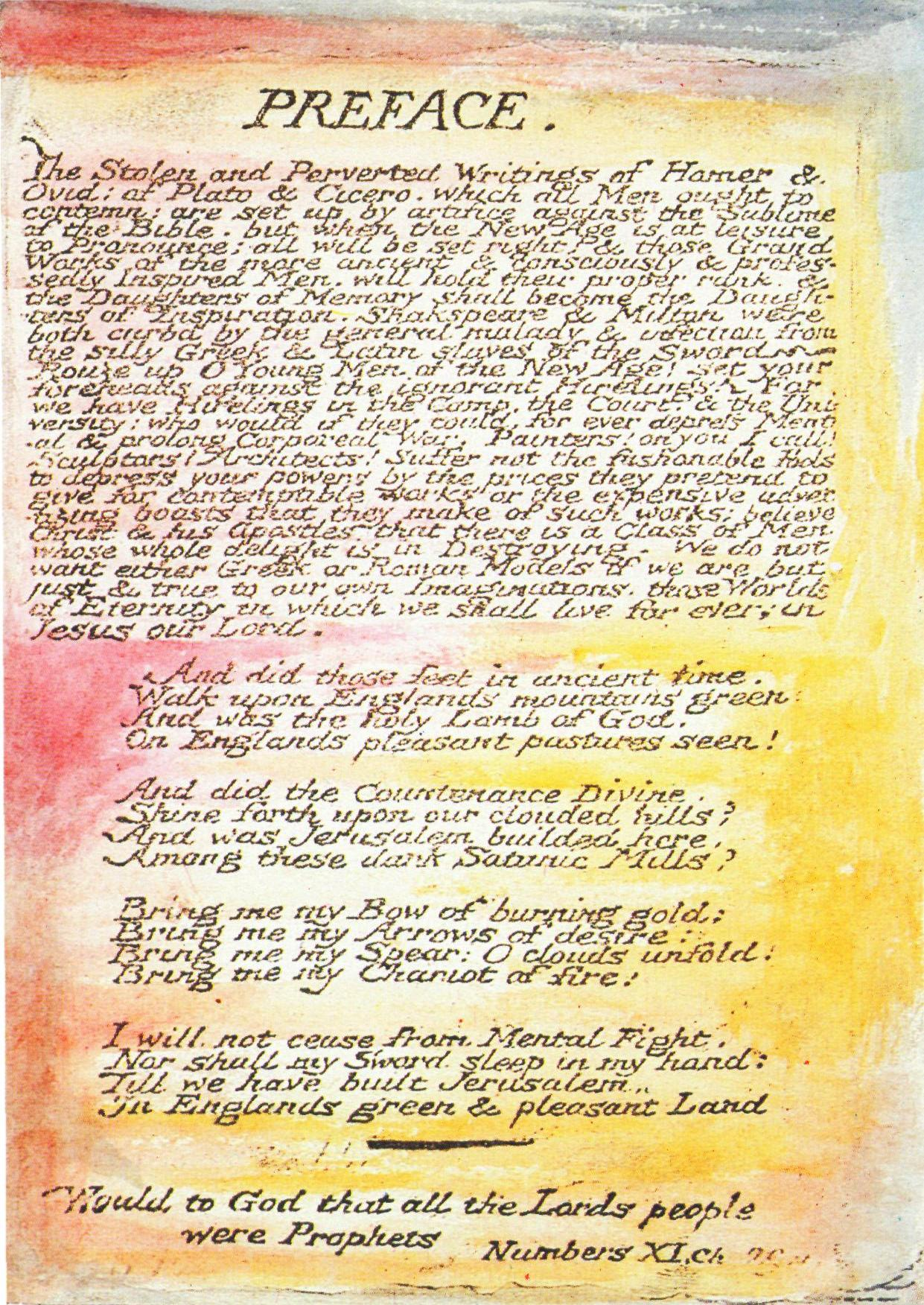
The preface to Milton, as it appeared in author and artist William Blake's own illuminated version

- Christopher Anstey, The Poetical Works of the Late Christopher Anstey
- Mary Matilda Betham, Poems
- William Blake, Milton, including the poem "And did those feet in ancient time", illuminated book probably published about this year, although the book states "1804 on the title page, likely when the plates were begun
- Felicia Dorothea Browne (later "Felicia Hemans"):
  - Poems
  - England and Spain; or, Valour and Patriotism
- Robert Burns, Reliques of Robert Burnes (posthumous)
- Lord Byron, Poems Original and Translated, the second edition of Hours of Idleness, 1807
- William Cowper:
  - Translator, Latin and Italian Poems of Milton Translated ito English Verse
  - Translator, Poems Translated from the French of Mme de la Mothe Guion
- James Grahame, The Siege of Copenhagen
- Charles Lamb, Specimens of English Dramatic Poets, who Lived about the Time of Shakespeare, anthology
- Mary Leadbeater, Poems
- Thomas Moore, A Selection of Irish Melodies, parts 1 and 2; songs, published in 10 parts 1808–1834
- Amelia Opie, The Warrior's Return, and Other Poems
- Walter Scott, Marmion, 10 editions by 1821
- Mary Shelley, see John Taylor
- John Taylor, possibly, or Mary Shelley (uncertain attribution), Mounseer Nongtongpaw, a poem for children

=== Other in English ===
- William Cullen Bryant, The Embargo; or, Sketches of the Times. A Satire. The Second Edition, Corrected and Enlarged, Together with the Spanish Revolution, and Other Poems, Boston: "Printed for the author, by E. G. House"; United States a verse satire against the trade restrictions of Thomas Jefferson; Bryant's father had the poem published as a pamphlet, which gained regional popularity
- David Hitchcock, A Poetical Dictionary; or, Popular Terms Illustrated in Rhyme, United States

== Works published in other languages ==
- Jacques Delille, Les Troi Règnes; France
- Johann Wolfgang von Goethe, Faust, part I, Germany
- Friedrich Hölderlin, "Der Rhein" and "Patmos", Germany

== Births ==
Death years link to the corresponding "[year] in poetry" article:

- February 5 – Carl Spitzweg (died 1885), German romanticist painter and poet
- March 22 – Caroline Norton (died 1877), English society beauty, novelist, poet, pamphleteer and playwright
- March 25 – José de Espronceda (died 1842), Spanish
- May 22 – Gérard de Nerval, pen name of Gérard Labrunie (died 1855), French essayist, translator and Romantic poet
- May 31 – Horatius Bonar (died 1889), Scottish Free Church cleric and poet
- June 11 – James Ballantine (died 1877), Scottish painter, author and poet
- June 17 – Henrik Wergeland (died 1845), Norwegian poet, playwright, polemicist, historian and linguist
- c. September 7 or 8 – William Livingston (Uilleam Macdhunleibhe) (died 1870), Scottish Gaelic poet
- September 21 – Evan MacColl (died 1898), Scottish-born Canadian poet writing in Scottish Gaelic and English

== Deaths ==
Birth years link to the corresponding "[year] in poetry" article:

- July 26 – Jacob Bailey, (born 1731), Church of England clergyman and poet born in the future United States, immigrated to Nova Scotia, Canada in 1779
- September 5 – John Home (born 1722), Scottish poet and dramatist
- November 4 – Melchiore Cesarotti (born 1730), Italian poet and translator
- c. November/December – Nólsoyar Páll (born 1766), Faroese merchant and poet, lost at sea
- date not known – Thomas Moss (born 1740), English clergyman and poet

== See also ==
- Poetry
- List of years in poetry
- List of years in literature
- 19th century in literature
- 19th century in poetry
- Romantic poetry
- Golden Age of Russian Poetry (1800–1850)
- Weimar Classicism period in Germany, commonly considered to have begun in 1788 and to have ended either in 1805, with the death of Friedrich Schiller, or 1832, with the death of Goethe
- List of poets

== Notes ==
- "A Timeline of English Poetry" Web page of the Representative Poetry Online Web site, University of Toronto
