= Arthur Brett =

Arthur Brett may refer to:

- Arthur Brett (poet) (d. 1677?), English poet
- Arthur Brett (courtier) (1595–1642), English courtier
- Arthur Brett and Sons, an English furniture maker founded in Norwich, Norfolk in 1870
