= Archibald Peile Stoddart =

Royal Navy Admiral (1860–1939)

Admiral Archibald Peile Stoddart CB
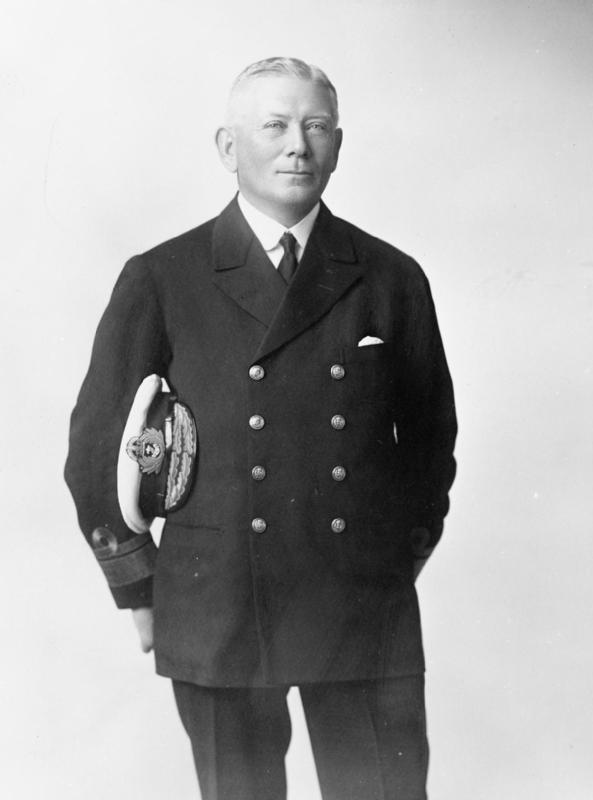

Admiral Archibald Peile Stoddart, CB (5 September 1860 – 18 December 1939) was a Royal Navy officer. He was best known for his participation in the Battle of the Falkland Islands in 1914, where he was second-in-command to Vice-Admiral Sir Doveton Sturdee.

Stoddart was the son of Rear-Admiral James Stoddart and the grandson of Rear-Admiral Pringle Stoddart. The artist Margaret Stoddart was his niece by his younger brother.
