= Veley =

English surname

Veley is an English surname. Notable people with the surname include:

- Alex Veley (born 1973), American musician, keyboardist, and singer
- Charles Veley, American traveler and businessman
- Lilian J. Veley, better known as Lilian Jane Gould (1861–1936), British biologist
- Margaret Veley (1843–1887), English poet and writer
