= Terræ filius =

Satirical orator at the University of Oxford

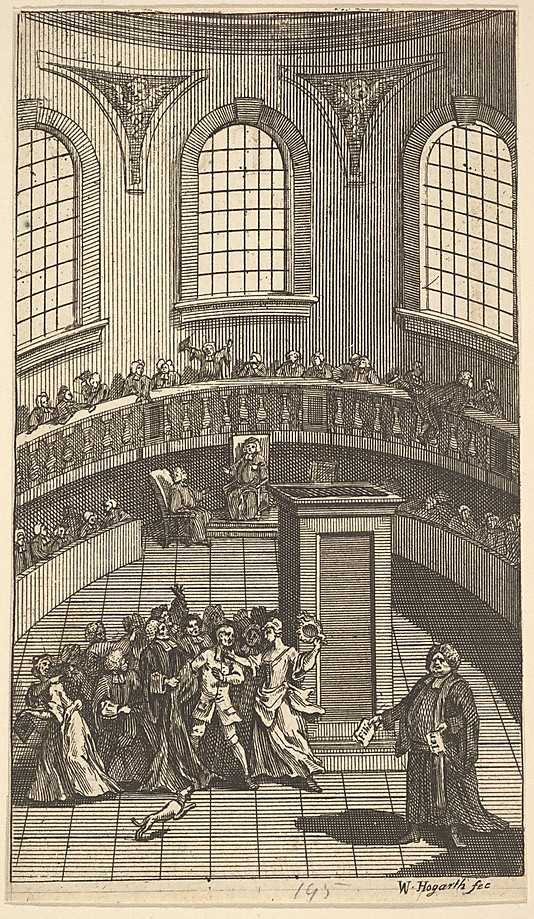
Frontispiece to Terrae-filius, Or, The Secret History of the University of Oxford (1726), by William Hogarth

The terræ filius (son of the soil) was a satirical orator who spoke at public ceremonies of the University of Oxford, for over a century. There was official sanction for personal attacks, but some of the speakers overstepped the line and fell into serious trouble. The custom was terminated during the 18th century. The comparable speaker at the University of Cambridge was called "prevaricator".

The bawdy poem The Oxford-Act (1693) contains a terræ filius speech, and is attributed to Alicia D'Anvers. Nicholas Amhurst took Terrae-filius, Or, The Secret History of the University of Oxford for the title of a series of periodical essays appearing from 1721, making up a 1726 book.

== List of terræ filii ==
- 1591 Supposedly "Thomas Tomkins", although this individual cannot be traced. This is the earliest known terræ filius.
- 1592 John Hoskins, expelled
- 1637 "Mr. Masters," expelled
- 1651 William Levinz and Thomas Careles
- 1655 Robert Whitehall and John Glendall
- c. 1656 unnamed terræ filius was forcibly arrested at the podium and taken to Bocardo Prison due to offensive language
- 1657 Daniel Danvers
- 1657 Lancelot Addison, forced to retract
- 1658 Thomas Pittys, expelled
- 1661 (one of several) Arthur Brett
- 1663 John Edwards and Joseph Brooks
- 1664 William Cave and Richard Wood, "stopped in their regency"
- 1665-8 no terræ filius
- 1669 Thomas Hayes and Henry Gerard, both expelled
- 1670 no terræ filius
- 1671 John Roderham and Nicholas Hall
- 1673 John Shirley
- 1674 Charles Layfield
- 1675 Venables Keeling
- 1676 Balthazar Vigures, expelled, and John Crofts, chaplain of New College, who retracted after the speech so was not expelled
- 1681 John More, beaten with a cudgel following the speech
- 1682 Henry Boles and Jacob Allestry
- 1683 Michael Smith
- 1684 Henry Walbanke and Thomas Easton
- 1693 Robert Turner and Henry Aldworth. Their full speeches (in Latin) survive in the notebook of Thomas Hearne.
- 1703 Robert Roberts; this year William Delaune was attacked
- 1706 Theodore Brooke
- 1713 Bernard Gardiner suppressed a Whig speech, as a threat to political stability. The speech was printed, but some copies were burned.
- 1713-33 No terræ filius
- 1733 No terræ filius but a speech was printed anonymously.
- 1763 Final appearance of the terræ filius, closely censored by the university and free of improper remarks.
