= Diamond Harbour, New Zealand =

Settlement in Christchurch, New Zealand

Diamond Harbour
- Town
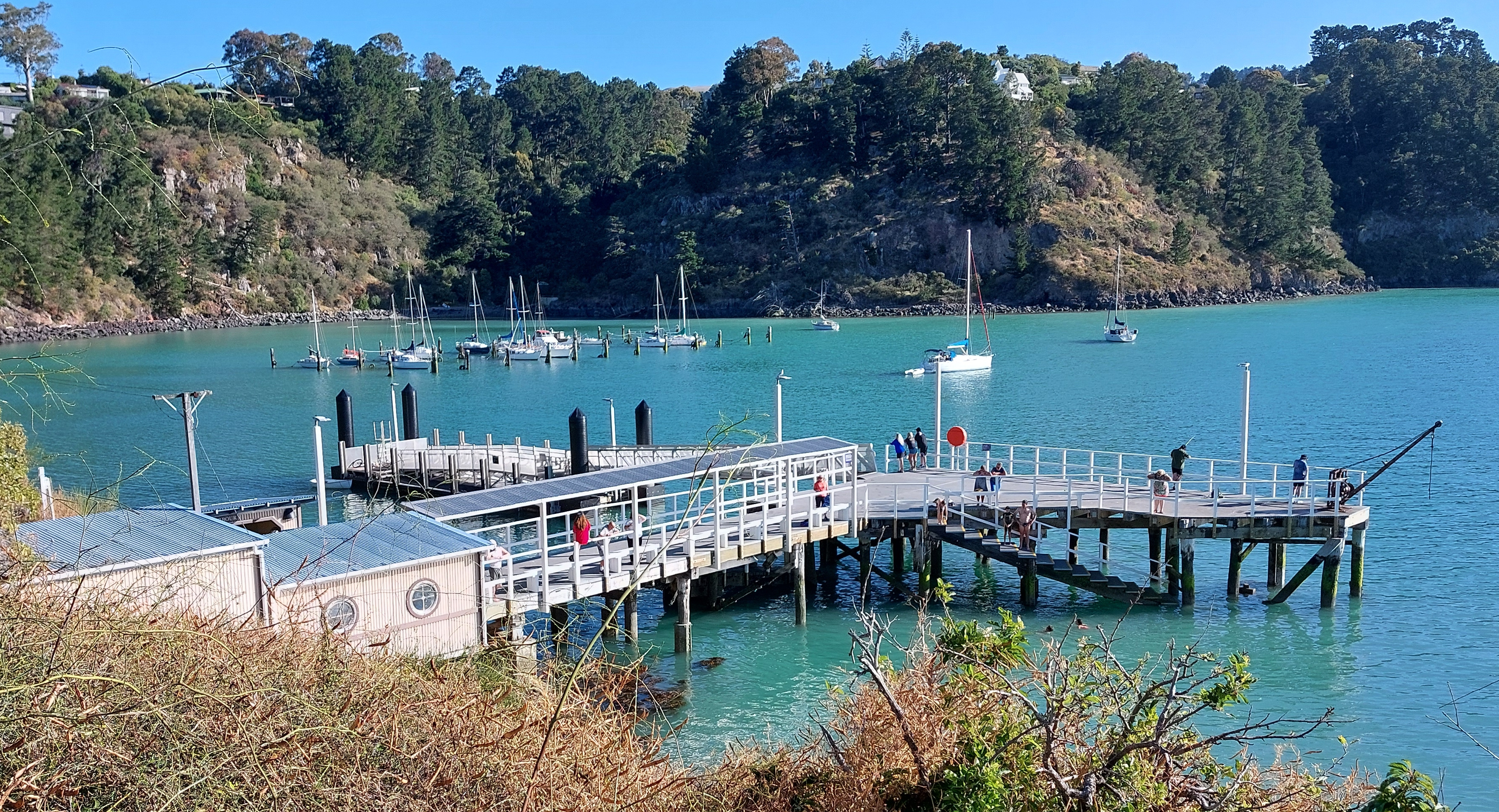
- Main Diamond Harbour wharf

- Small urban area within Christchurch City Council boundaries

- Location within South Island Location within New Zealand
- Coordinates: 43°37′43.6″S 172°43′53.6″E
- Country: New Zealand
- Region: Canterbury
- District: Christchurch City
- Ward: Banks Peninsula
- Community: Te Pātaka o Rākaihautū Banks Peninsula
- Electorates: Banks Peninsula; Te Tai Tonga (Māori)

Government
  - Territorial Authority: Christchurch City Council
  - Regional council: Environment Canterbury
  - Mayor of Christchurch: Phil Mauger
  - Banks Peninsula MP: Vanessa Weenink
  - Te Tai Tonga MP: Tākuta Ferris

Area
  - Total: 3.02 km^{2} (1.17 sq mi)

Population (June 2025)
  - Total: 1,610
  - Density: 533/km^{2} (1,380/sq mi)
- Local iwi: Ngāi Tahu

Diamond Harbour is a small town on Banks Peninsula, in Canterbury, New Zealand. It is on the peninsula's northern coast, on the southern shores of Lyttelton Harbour, and is administratively part of the city of Christchurch.

== Naming ==
The area was named by Mark Stoddart for the glint of sunlight on water. He bought 500 acres (200 ha) of land in the area in 1856 to farm. The name also applies to the bay within Lyttelton Harbour / Whakaraupō adjacent to the settlement. In 1949, the bay's name changed from Te Waipapa Harbour to Diamond Harbour (Te Waipapa). In 2003, the name changed further to Te Waipapa / Diamond Harbour.

== Godley House ==
Godley House was built in 1880 by Harvey Hawkins (a ship chandler, ironmonger and financial speculator) on land purchased from Mark Stoddart. This large family home was renowned for parties with party goers arriving on Harry Hawkin's steam launch, the Waiwera. Hawkins went bankrupt and the house and contents were auctioned off in 1896.

It did not sell and the Stoddart family, as secured creditors, acquired the property and moved in until the death of Anna Stoddart in 1911. Her daughter Margaret Stoddart lived there also and painted several pictures of Godley House.

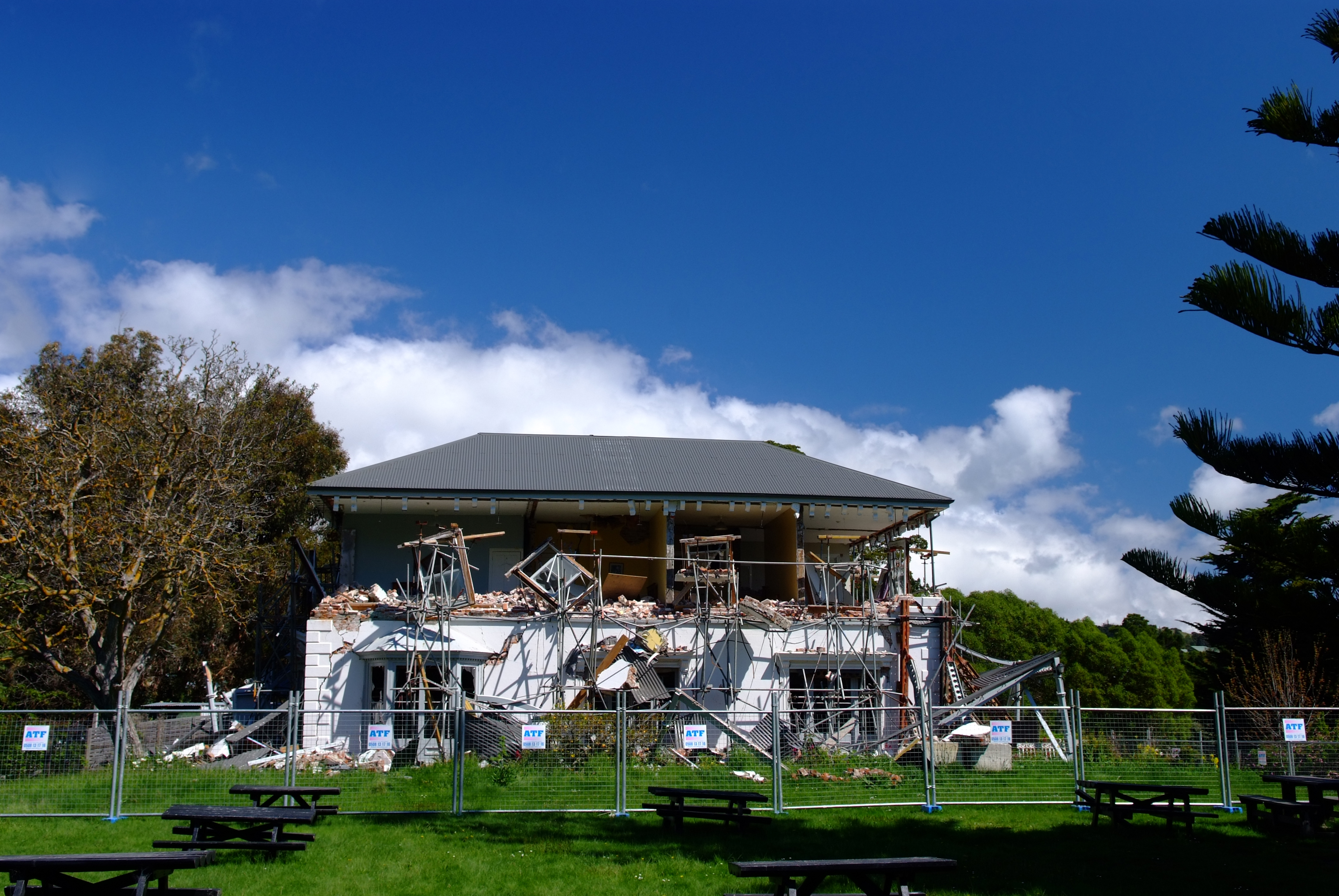
Godley House, having suffered extensive earthquake damage

The property was then sold to the Lyttelton Borough Council. At that time it was named Godley House after John Robert Godley.

Godley House and the land surrounding it was made a recreational reserve in 2006.

It was used as a hotel, restaurant and conference centre prior to the September 2010 Canterbury earthquake.

Godley House was badly damaged in the September 2010 earthquake but it was thought that it could be repaired. However, damage caused by the February 2011 earthquake resulted in the Category II Historic Place being demolished.

== Stoddart Cottage ==
Stoddart Cottage, built for Stoddart's wedding in 1862, is the oldest building still standing in Diamond Harbour. It was registered by the New Zealand Historic Places Trust as a Category I historic building in 1990. The artist Margaret Stoddart grew up in the cottage. It is open on weekends and public holidays. It hosts art exhibitions on occasions.

== Demographics ==
Diamond Harbour is described by Stats NZ as a small urban area, which includes Charteris Bay and Purau, and covers 3.02 km^{2} (1.17 sq mi). It had an estimated population of 1,610 as of June 2025, with a population density of 533 people per km^{2}.

Historical population
Year	Pop.	±% p.a.
2006	1,209	—
2013	1,350	+1.59%
2018	1,566	+3.01%
2023	1,608	+0.53%
The 2006 population is for a larger area of 4.06 km^{2}, but which did not include Purau. Source:

Diamond Harbour had a population of 1,608 in the 2023 New Zealand census, an increase of 42 people (2.7%) since the 2018 census, and an increase of 258 people (19.1%) since the 2013 census. There were 792 males, 807 females, and 6 people of other genders in 738 dwellings. 4.3% of people identified as LGBTIQ+. The median age was 54.1 years (compared with 38.1 years nationally). There were 210 people (13.1%) aged under 15 years, 135 (8.4%) aged 15 to 29, 801 (49.8%) aged 30 to 64, and 456 (28.4%) aged 65 or older.

People could identify as more than one ethnicity. The results were 95.3% European (Pākehā); 6.9% Māori; 1.7% Pasifika; 1.5% Asian; 0.6% Middle Eastern, Latin American and African New Zealanders (MELAA); and 2.8% other, which includes people giving their ethnicity as "New Zealander". English was spoken by 98.7%, Māori by 1.3%, Samoan by 0.4%, and other languages by 11.4%. No language could be spoken by 0.9% (e.g. too young to talk). New Zealand Sign Language was known by 0.4%. The percentage of people born overseas was 29.9, compared with 28.8% nationally.

Religious affiliations were 25.0% Christian, 0.2% Islam, 0.7% Buddhist, 0.9% New Age, and 1.9% other religions. People who answered that they had no religion were 64.6%, and 6.7% of people did not answer the census question.

Of those at least 15 years old, 564 (40.3%) people had a bachelor's or higher degree, 651 (46.6%) had a post-high school certificate or diploma, and 174 (12.4%) people exclusively held high school qualifications. The median income was $37,800, compared with $41,500 nationally. 210 people (15.0%) earned over $100,000 compared to 12.1% nationally. The employment status of those at least 15 was 606 (43.3%) full-time, 246 (17.6%) part-time, and 18 (1.3%) unemployed.

== Amenities ==
The centre of the village has a restaurant, a library, community hall, a rugby club, a bowls club, a croquet club and a medical centre, all overlooking the village cricket pitch and rugby field. Orton Bradley Park is located very close to the township of Diamond Harbour. As of 2021 it has a Four Square supermarket in a new mini-mall which includes a fish and chip shop, a café bar, and a self-service fuel station.

== Education ==
Diamond Harbour School is a full primary school catering for years 1 to 8. It had a roll of 110 as of July 2026. The school opened in 1945.

== Transport ==
A ferry connects Diamond Harbour to Lyttelton, on the harbour's northern shore. In combination with buses from Lyttelton to Christchurch, this allows residents of Diamond Harbour to commute to the city. Diamond Harbour is 25 kilometres via the Governors Bay road to Lyttelton.

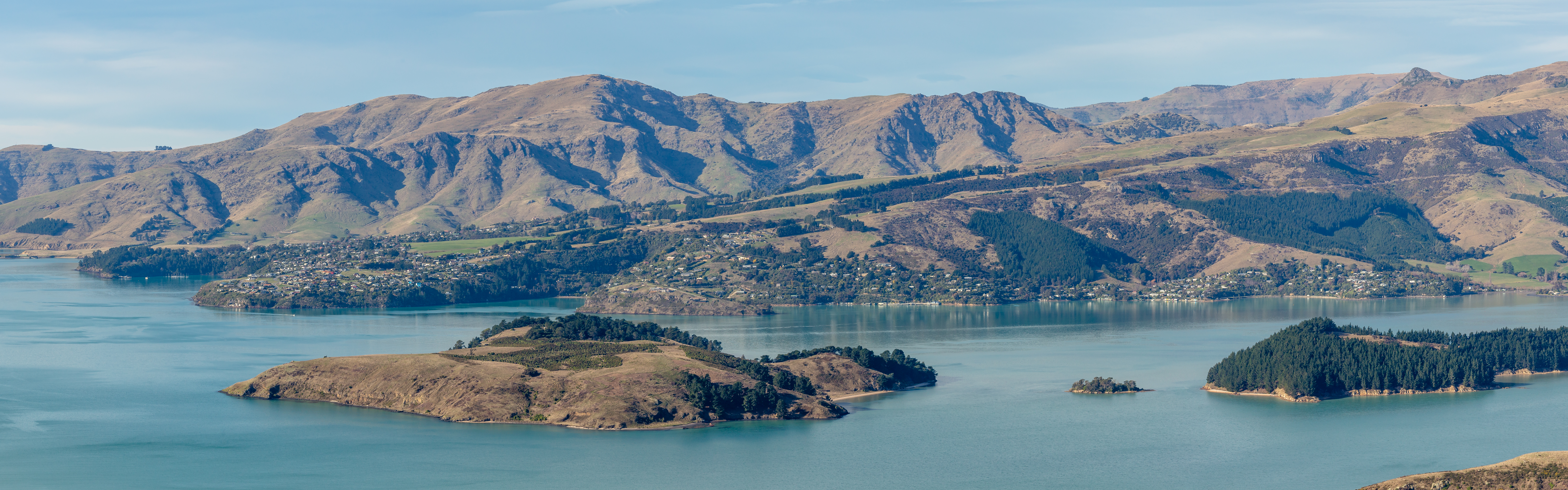
Diamond Harbour from Port Hills

== Climate ==
Climate data for Diamond Harbour (1991–2020)
Month	Jan	Feb	Mar	Apr	May	Jun	Jul	Aug	Sep	Oct	Nov	Dec	Year
Mean daily maximum °C (°F)	21.5 (70.7)	21.3 (70.3)	18.9 (66.0)	16.5 (61.7)	14.2 (57.6)	11.2 (52.2)	10.6 (51.1)	11.5 (52.7)	13.6 (56.5)	15.4 (59.7)	17.0 (62.6)	19.5 (67.1)	15.9 (60.7)
Daily mean °C (°F)	16.8 (62.2)	17.0 (62.6)	14.9 (58.8)	12.8 (55.0)	10.7 (51.3)	8.1 (46.6)	7.4 (45.3)	8.2 (46.8)	9.8 (49.6)	11.4 (52.5)	12.9 (55.2)	15.3 (59.5)	12.1 (53.8)
Mean daily minimum °C (°F)	12.1 (53.8)	12.7 (54.9)	10.9 (51.6)	9.1 (48.4)	7.2 (45.0)	5.0 (41.0)	4.2 (39.6)	4.9 (40.8)	6.0 (42.8)	7.4 (45.3)	8.8 (47.8)	11.1 (52.0)	8.3 (46.9)
Source: NIWA

== In popular culture ==
The British comedy podcast Three Bean Salad features an occasional recurring segment about Diamond Harbour.
