= Robert Whitehall =

Robert Whitehall (1624 – 8 July 1685) was an English poet, and fellow of Merton College, Oxford.

== Life ==
Whitehall was born in Amersham, Buckinghamshire, and was baptised there at St Mary's Church on 18 March 1624. He was the only son of Robert Whitehall, vicar of St. Mary Magdalen, Oxford and from 1616 rector of Addington, Buckinghamshire; and his first wife Bridget Watkins, who died soon after childbirth. Her husband remarried, and had seven further children.

Whitehall was educated first at Westminster School, under Richard Busby, and was then elected to Christ Church, Oxford in 1643. He graduated BA on 2 November 1647. On 10 May following, with other students of Christ Church, he was summoned to appear before the parliamentary visitors, and, when questioned, replied: "As I am summoned a student of Christ Church, my name itself speaks for me, that I can acknowledge no visitation but King Charles's". Subsequent development of this reply converted it into an indifferent distich:

My name's Whitehall, God bless the poet;
If I submit the king shall know it.

=== Merton College ===
He was expelled on 7 July 1648, apparently retiring to his father's house in Buckinghamshire. There coming into contact with his neighbour Richard Ingoldsby, Whitehall became popular with the parliamentary party, submitted to the committee for regulating the university, and was by them elected to a fellowship in Merton College in 1650. He completed his degree of MA on 18 November 1652. In 1655 he was terræ filius, and he derided the puritan discipline of the university. In 1657 Henry Cromwell, writing from Ireland (22 June), requested the college authorities to allow him leave of absence, without loss of emolument, in order to give instruction in the University of Dublin; the permission was granted in the following August. He was created MB on 5 September 1657.

On 21 June 1665 he appears to have been in Oxford, when he was licensed to practise medicine. He was certainly there on 19 October 1670, when he wrote from Merton College to Joseph Williamson begging for consideration for his losses, he having been "worsted in spirituals of £250 a year and nearly £1,000 by the Cheshire misadventure" (probably referring to Booth's uprising). Whitehall was tutor to John Wilmot, 2nd Earl of Rochester, at Oxford, and much devoted to him. He was sub-warden of Merton College in 1671. He died on 8 July 1685, and was buried in Merton College Chapel on the following day.

== Assessment ==
Anthony Wood calls Whitehall "a mere poetaster and time-serving poet". His works consist chiefly of congratulatory odes, and "his pen seems to have been as ready to celebrate Oliver Cromwell's elevation to the protectorate as to congratulate Charles II on his recovery from an ague; and equally lavish of panegyric, whether Richard Cromwell or Lord Clarendon, whom he hailed as chancellors of the university". Bertha Porter remarks that his works "possess a certain rhythmic fluency not unpleasant to the ear".

== Works ==
He published:

1. Τεχνηπολεμογαμία, or the Marriage of Arms and Arts, 12 July 1651, being an Accompt of the Act in Oxon. to a Friend, London, 1651.
2. Viro … honoratissimo … Eduardo Hide on his being raised to the dignity of Chancellor of the University of Oxford), Oxford, 1660?
3. The Coronation, London, 1661?
4. Urania, or a Description of the Painting of the Top of the Theatre at Oxford, as the Artist laid his Design, London, 1669.
5. Verses on Mrs. More, upon her sending Sir Thomas More's picture (of her own drawing) to the Long Gallery at the Public Schools at Oxford, Oxford, 1674. The picture presented by Mrs. More is, however, a portrait of Thomas Cromwell, earl of Essex (Walpole, Anecdotes, 1765, iii. 148).
6. Ἑξάστιχον Iερόν; sive Iconum quarundam extranearum (numero 258) Explicatio breviuscula et clara, Oxford, 1677. This work, of which only twelve copies were printed, consisted of plates purchased by Whitehall in Holland, illustrating both the Old and New Testament. The majority of the plates were those (in many cases reversed) engraved by Matthias Merian for a German edition of the Bible published in Strasburg in 1630. They afterwards appeared in Afbeeldingen der voornaamste Historien, published by Nicolaes Visscher in Amsterdam. Whitehall's plates appear to have been specially printed on thin paper. Each was pasted on a sheet of paper on which had previously been printed six explanatory verses by Whitehall. His twelve copies were handsomely bound, and presented severally to the king and to noble friends.
7. Gratulamini mecum: a Congratulatory Essay upon His Majesties Most Happy Recovery, London, 1679.
8. The English Rechabite, or a defyance to Bacchus and all his works, London, 1680?

Whitehall contributed one Latin and one English poem to Musarum Oxoniensium elaiophoria, sive, Ob Fœdera Auspiciis Serenissimi Olivieri Reipub. Oxford, 1654; one Latin poem under his own name in Britannia Rediviva, Oxford, 1660 (with another Latin poem with the name of John Wilmot, Earl of Rochester, attached, which is more probably the work of Whitehall); two Latin and one English to Epicedia Academiæ Oxoniensis in Obitum Serenissimæ Mariæ Principis Arausionensis, Oxford, 1661. Four of the pieces were reprinted in the Earl of Rochester's Poems on several Occasions, London, 1697.
