= Anne Wharton =

English poet and dramatist (1659–1685)

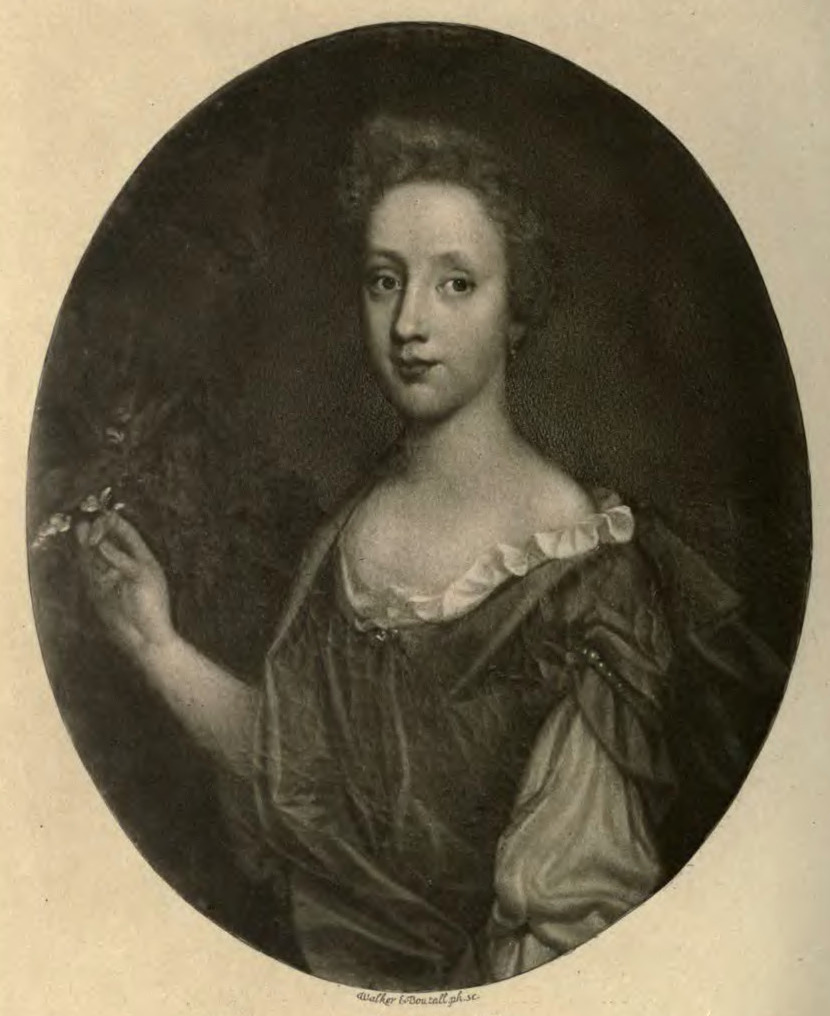
- portrait by Peter Lely
- Born: Anne Lee; 20 July 1659; Ditchley Park, Oxfordshire, England
- Died: 29 October 1685 (aged 26); East Adderbury, Oxfordshire, England
- Occupations: poet & verse dramatist
- Spouse: Thomas Wharton
- Writing career
- Language: English
- Notable work: Love's Martyr

Anne Wharton (née Lee, 20 July 1659 - 29 October 1685) was an English poet and verse dramatist. Little of her work was published in her lifetime, but some 45 pieces have been ascribed to her.

== Life ==
Anne Lee was born 20 July 1659 at Ditchley Park, Oxfordshire, the posthumous younger daughter of Sir Henry Lee, and a member of a wealthy family. Her mother Anne Danvers, daughter of Sir John Danvers, died not long after her birth. She and her sister Eleanor were brought up at Adderbury House, where they lived with the mistress, mother and grandmother of its owner, the poet and libertine John Wilmot, 2nd Earl of Rochester, who was Anne Wharton's uncle.

On 16 September 1673 she married Thomas Wharton (1648–1715). She paid visits to Paris for her health in 1678 and 1680, as she suffered from eye troubles and convulsions, possibly linked to syphilis. Her husband soon neglected her and they had no children.

== Death ==
Anne Wharton died on 29 October 1685 at Adderbury, Oxfordshire. Her death, in her sister Eleanor's house, was very painful. The poet Robert Gould in an eclogue to the memory of Eleanor, who died in 1691, observes that her own was a peaceful one by comparison:

"Think how her sister, dear 'Urania' [i. e. Anne], fell,
When ev'ry Arte'ry, Fibre, Nerve and Vein
Were by Convulsions torn, and fill'd with Pain..."

== Allegations ==
After her death, her brother-in-law, Goodwin Wharton claimed in his autobiography to have had an affair with her, and alleged that she had had three other affairs – with Charles Mordaunt, 3rd Earl of Peterborough before her marriage (ostensibly bribing a servant to let him into the girl's room at night) and with "Jack Howe" (probably the Whig politician John Grubham Howe, 1657–1722) in the 1680s – as well as being "lain with long by her uncle, my Lord Rochester."

Her letters to her husband from Paris seem devoted, but when he visited her again in Paris, to obtain her signature on some documents to do with her £8000 estate, her ardour seems to have cooled.

== Works ==
Wharton is remembered today for the verse drama Love's Martyr; or, Witt above Crowns, and for a number of lyrical poems and biblical paraphrases, but all that was published in her lifetime was a heartfelt elegy on Rochester's death, under the pseudonym Urania. This brought appreciative poetic responses from Edmund Waller and Aphra Behn. Behn's was a verse-letter addressed to Anne, included in her 1684 Poems on Several Occasions, in which she took the opportunity of defending herself from a charge of bawdiness brought by the future bishop Gilbert Burnet, who had attended Rochester on his deathbed. Anne may also have prompted Behn to provide a prologue for Rochester's play Valentinian, which was first performed in 1684.

A modern critical edition of 34 known works by Anne Wharton appeared in 1997, but at least eleven other poems have been discovered in manuscript since then. Her "Elegy on the Earl of Rochester" appears in the New Oxford Book of Seventeenth-Century Verse (1991) and "A Paraphrase on the Last Speech of Dido in Virgil's Aeneis" in Seventeenth-Century Poetry: An Annotated Anthology.

== A Song ==
How hardly I concealed my Tears?
How oft did I complain?
When many tedious Days, my Fears
Told me I Loved in vain.

But now my Joys as wild are grown,
And hard to be concealed:
Sorrow may make a silent Moan,
But Joy will be revealed.

I tell it to the Bleating Flocks,
To every Stream and Tree,
And Bless the Hollow Murmuring Rocks
For Echoing back to me.

Thus you may see with how much Joy
We Want, we Wish, Believe;
'Tis hard such Passion to Destroy,
But easy to Deceive.
