= Jacob Allestry =

Political writer and poet

Jacob Allestry (1653–1686) was an English poet.

== Biography ==
Jacob Allestry, the son of James Allestry, a bookseller who lost his property in the Great Fire of London, was born in 1653. After being educated at Westminster he proceeded to Christ Church, Oxford, in 1671; was music-reader in 1679 and terræ filius in 1682. He had the "chief hand", according to Anthony à Wood, in composing the Verses and Pastoral spoken in Oxford Theatre on 21 May 1681, before James, Duke of York, and published in Examen Poeticum, 1693.

Wood also wrote that hard living caused Allestry to move to a house in Fish Row, in St. Thomas' parish, in the suburbs of Oxford. There he was nursed incognito for about seven weeks, and died "in a poor condition and of a loathsome disease" on Friday, 15 October 1686.

== Legacy ==
His poems have been included in several Oxford period poetry anthologies.
