= Pringle Stoddart =

British Royal Navy officer (1768–1848)

Rear-Admiral Pringle Stoddart (23 May 1768 – 1848) was a British Royal Navy officer.

== Life ==
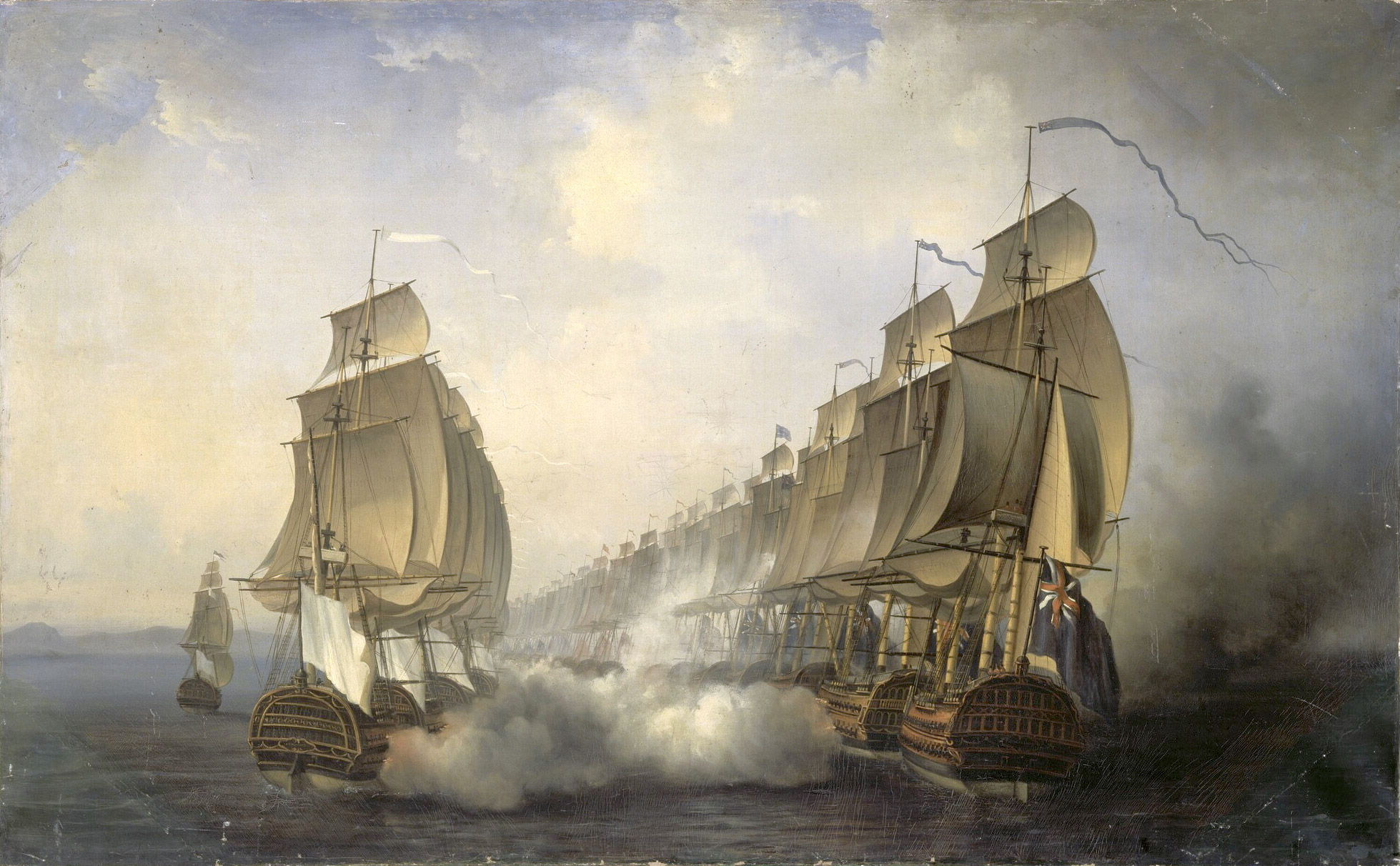
The Battle of Cuddalore

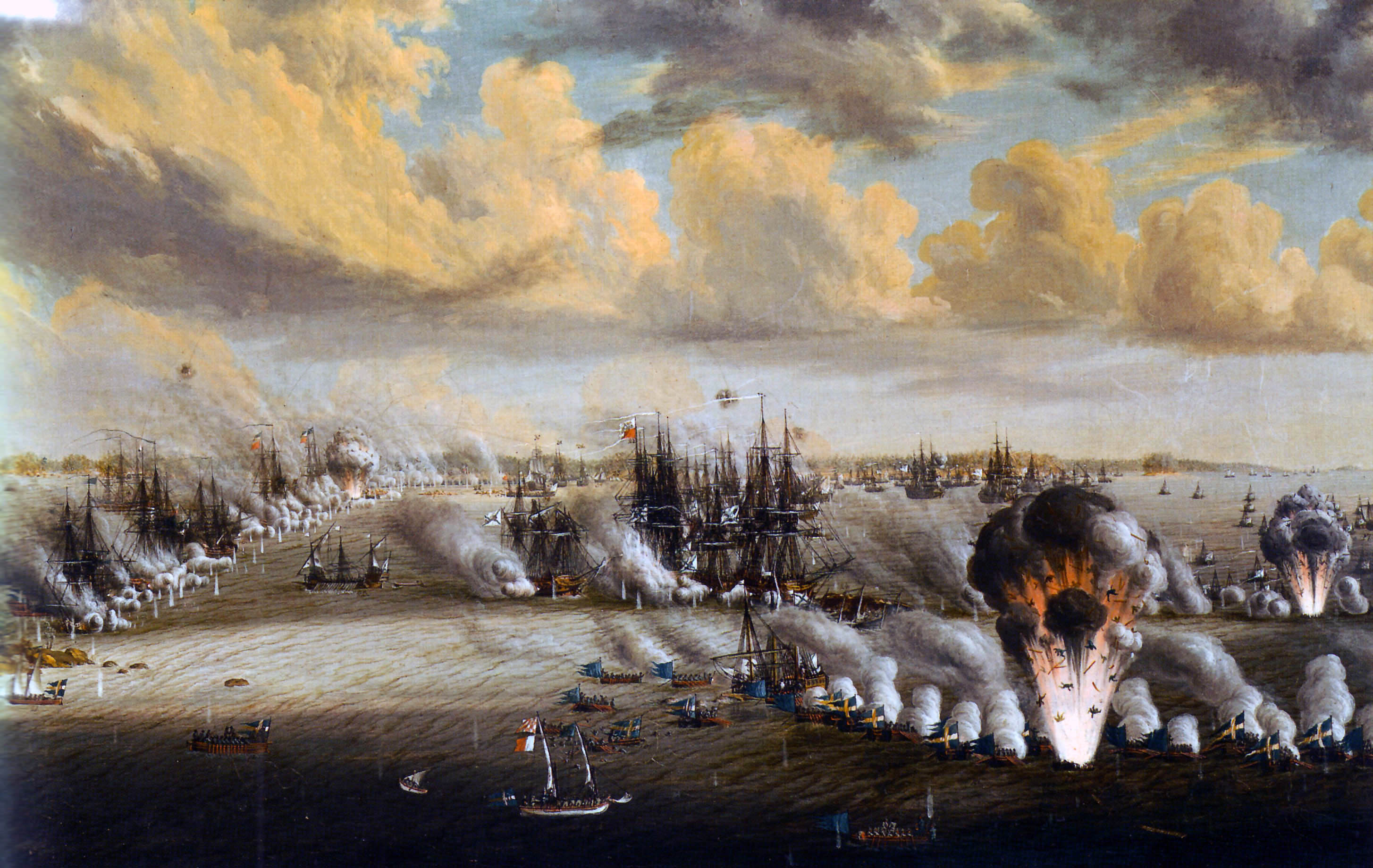
The Battle of Svensksund

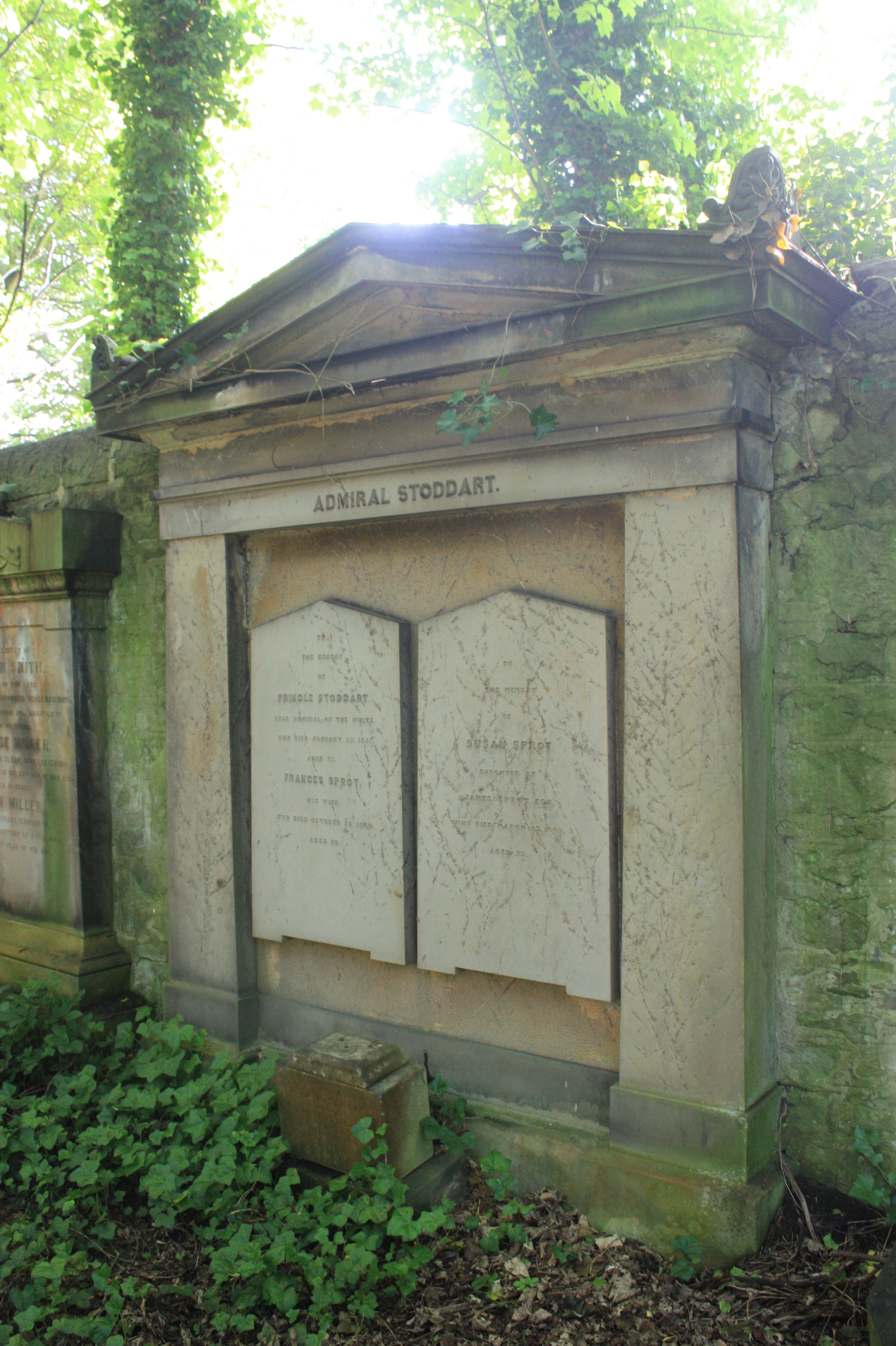
The grave of Admiral Stoddart, Warriston Cemetery, Edinburgh

Originally serving as a cadet in the East India Company he joined the Royal Navy as a midshipman on HMS Exeter in April 1783. He saw his first action in the Battle of Cuddalore two months later. In 1784 he transferred to HMS Venus under Captain Charles Hudson.

In 1786 he suffered a set-back in his career, being paid off from the Royal Navy (together with many others). He then joined the Russian navy as a lieutenant. Serving there for four years his most dramatic actions were the Battle of Ochakov in 1788 (against the Turks) the Battle of Kerch Strait in 1790 (also against the Turks) and the Battle of Svensksund on 9/10 July 1790 against the Swedish. He was wounded in both the first and last battles. He returned to Britain in 1791 to recover. He then rejoined the Royal Navy as a midshipman serving on HMS Formidable under Leveson-Gower. Presumably dissatisfied he briefly rejoined the East India Company before the war with France erupted in 1793 at which point he rejoined the navy. He took a place as Master’s Mate on HMS Andromache under Captain Theophilus Jones. Ultimately he became acting lieutenant on the Chatham-built HMS Queen Charlotte. Here he saw action against the French in Lord Howe’s fleet during the Battle of the Glorious First of June in 1794.

He was raised to the rank of lieutenant in 1796. After a brief spell on HMS Trident he served at the Cape of Good Hope on HMS Tremendous under Rear Admiral Hugh Cloberry Christian, witnessing the capture of the Dutch fleet at Saldanha Bay. He took another break back in Britain then joined the infamous HMS Royal Sovereign in 1804 in the Mediterranean fleet under Admiral Richard Bickerton. In 1805 he was made commander of HMS Cruizer, then a relatively new and “modern” ship. In this he captured two 16-gun French privateers: Le Jena and Le Brave. He also recaptured two merchant ships and three navy ships from enemy hands.

In 1807, as part of the Battle of Copenhagen, as part of the northern fleet, he was much praised for his bravery by Admiral Gambier.

In retirement he lived at 10 Bellevue Crescent in the eastern New Town of Edinburgh.

He is buried in Warriston Cemetery in northern Edinburgh. The substantial but simple memorial lies against the western wall.

He died at his home on Bellevue Crescent on 29 January 1848.

== Family ==
In 1807 he was married to Frances Sprot. They had seven children, including the noted poet and angler Thomas Tod Stoddart (1810-1880).

Their third son, James Stoddart (1813–1892), also rose to the level of rear admiral in the Royal Navy on HMS Cornwallis, first serving on HMS Wellesley and HMS St Vincent. James’ son Archibald Peile Stoddart created three rear admirals in a row within the family.

His fourth son, Mark Pringle Stoddart (1819-1885), was father to the New Zealand artist, Margaret Stoddart.

His eldest daughter was Frances Stoddart (thought to be the artist of that name).

His youngest daughter, Susan Matilda Stoddart, married Rev Robert Taylor of Blairgowrie.
