= Stoddart Cottage =

Heritage building

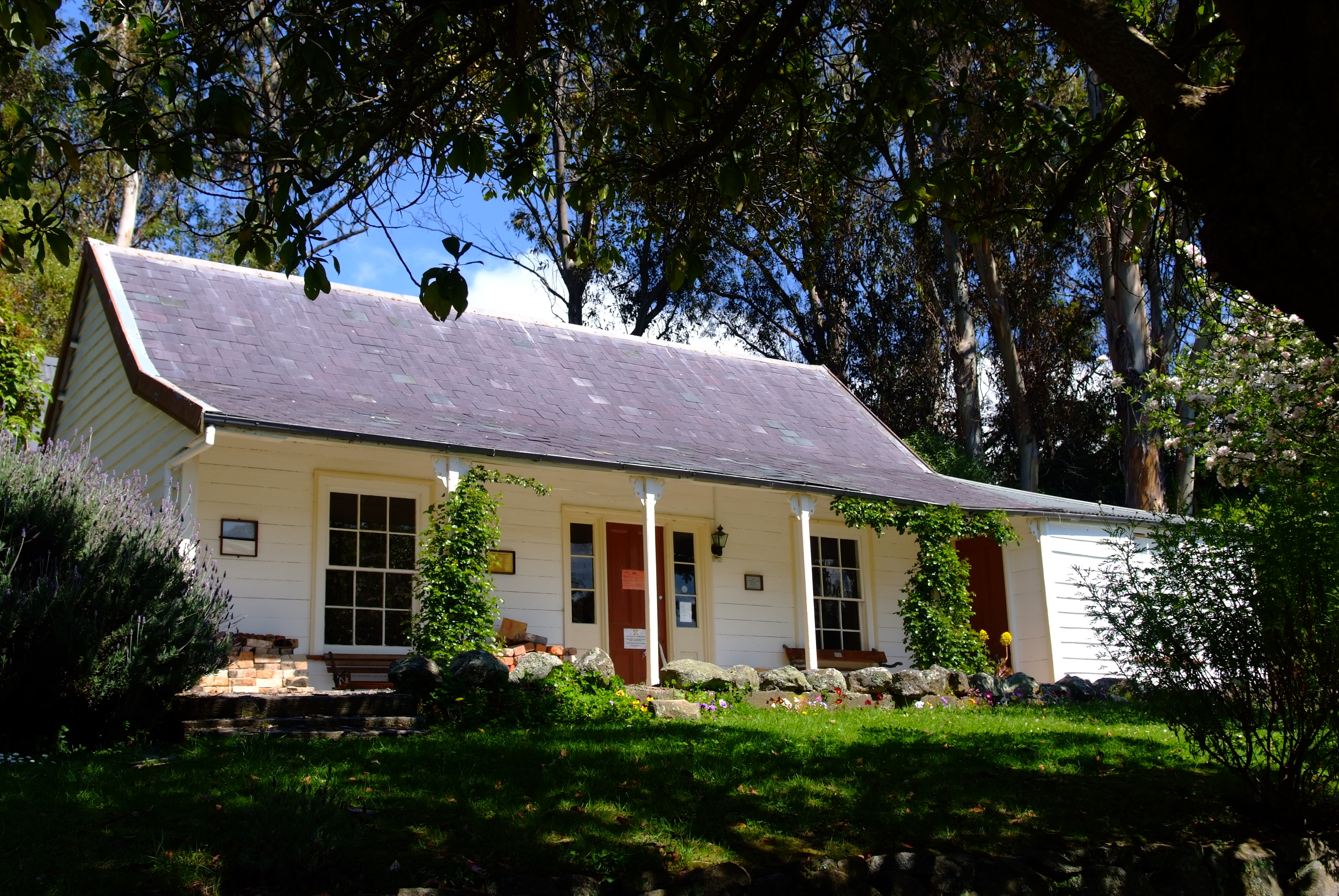
- Stoddart Cottage in 2016
- Interactive map of the Stoddart Cottage area

General information
- Location: Purau Avenue, Diamond Harbour; New Zealand
- Coordinates: 43°37′35.14″S 172°44′28.37″E
- Completed: 1862
- Client: Mark Stoddart

Heritage New Zealand – Category 1
- Designated: 15 February 1990
- Reference no.: 3088

Stoddart Cottage is located in Diamond Harbour, New Zealand. Built in time for the wedding of his owner, Mark Stoddart, in February 1862, it was the birthplace of artist Margaret Stoddart. Stoddart Cottage is the oldest building in Diamond Harbour. On 15 February 1990, the building was registered by the New Zealand Historic Places Trust (now Heritage New Zealand) as a category I heritage structure, with registration number 3088.

== See also ==
- List of oldest buildings in Christchurch
