= The Beggar's Petition =

Thomas Moss poem

"The Beggar's Petition" (or "The Beggar") is a poem written by Thomas Moss and published anonymously in 1769 which "contains much pathetic and natural sentiment finely expressed." In 1790, a Latin translation of the poem was published by William Humphries under the title "Mendici supplicatio".

The poem is referenced in the opening pages of Jane Austen's Northanger Abbey as an example of a poem commonly memorized by young women of the day. It is also mentioned in Charles Dickens' Nicholas Nickleby as the little boy rubs his eyes with it while being boxed on the ears by the schoolmaster Mr. Squeers. It's also mentioned in Dickens's Little Dorrit.
