= John Winstanley =

English poet

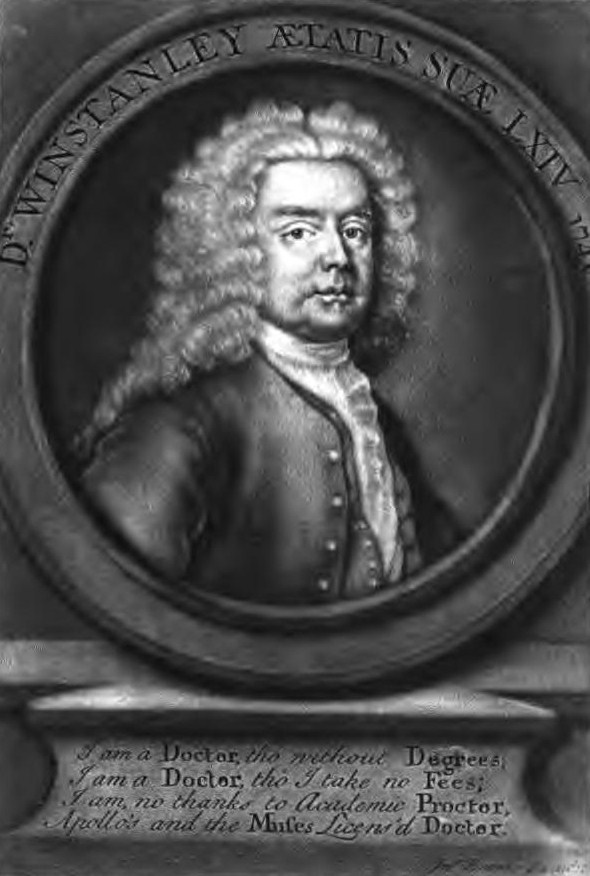
John Winstanley

John Winstanley (1678? – 1750) was an English Enlightenment figure and poet, probably born in Ireland.

== Works ==
- Poems Written Occasionally (1742)
