= Arthur Brett and Sons =

English furniture maker

Arthur Brett and Sons was an English furniture maker. The company was founded in Norwich, Norfolk in 1870. The company created bespoke furniture and architectural interiors such as paneled rooms and libraries. The antiques arm of the business became a separate business and closed in 2015.

According to the company, a significant proportion of its business originates from Russia, the Middle East and the US.
