= Augusta Webster =

English poet, dramatist, essayist and translator

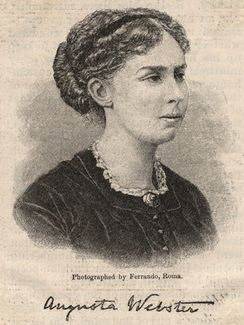
- Etching of Webster based on photograph from Rome
- Born: Julia Augusta Davies; 30 January 1837; Poole, Dorset
- Died: 5 September 1894 (aged 57); Kew
- Resting place: Highgate Cemetery
- Other name: Cecil Homes
- Education: Cambridge School of Art

Augusta Webster (30 January 1837 – 5 September 1894) born in Poole, Dorset as Julia Augusta Davies, was an English poet, dramatist, essayist, and translator. She is known for her translations of the works of Aeschylus and Euripides.

== Biography ==
Augusta was the daughter of Vice-admiral George Davies (1800–1876) and Julia Hume (1803–1897), the fourth daughter of Joseph Hume of Somerset House. She spent her younger years on board the ship, the Griper, her father, as lieutenant of the coast guard at that time, held command. After her father's appointment to the rank of commander in 1842, Webster resided for six years in Banff Castle in Aberdeenshire, Scotland. Later, following a short time in Penzance, Cornwall, in 1851 Webster resettled in Cambridge, as her father became the chief constable of Cambridgeshire.

She self-studied Greek, Italian and Spanish at home, taking a particular interest in Greek drama, and went on to study at the Cambridge School of Art. During a brief residence in Paris and Geneva, she acquired a 'full knowledge' of the French language. She published her first volume of poetry in 1860 under the pen name Cecil Homes. In 1863, she married Thomas Webster, a fellow and lecturer in Law at Trinity College, Cambridge. They had a daughter, Augusta Georgiana, who married Reverend George Theobald Bourke, a younger son of the Joseph Bourke, 3rd Earl of Mayo.

Much of Webster's writing explored the condition of women, and she was a strong advocate of women's right to vote, working for the London branch of the National Committee for Women's Suffrage. She was the first female writer to hold elective office, having been elected to the London School Board in 1879 and 1885. In 1885 she travelled to Italy in an attempt to improve her failing health. She died on 5 September 1894, aged 57.

During her lifetime her writing was acclaimed and she was considered by some the successor to Elizabeth Barrett Browning. After her death, however, her reputation quickly declined. Since the mid-1990s she has gained increasing critical attention from scholars such as Isobel Armstrong, Angela Leighton, and Christine Sutphin. Her best-known poems include three long dramatic monologues spoken by women: A Castaway, Circe, and The Happiest Girl In The World, as well as a posthumously published Sonnet Sequence, Mother and Daughter, of which her only child, Augusta, is its subject.

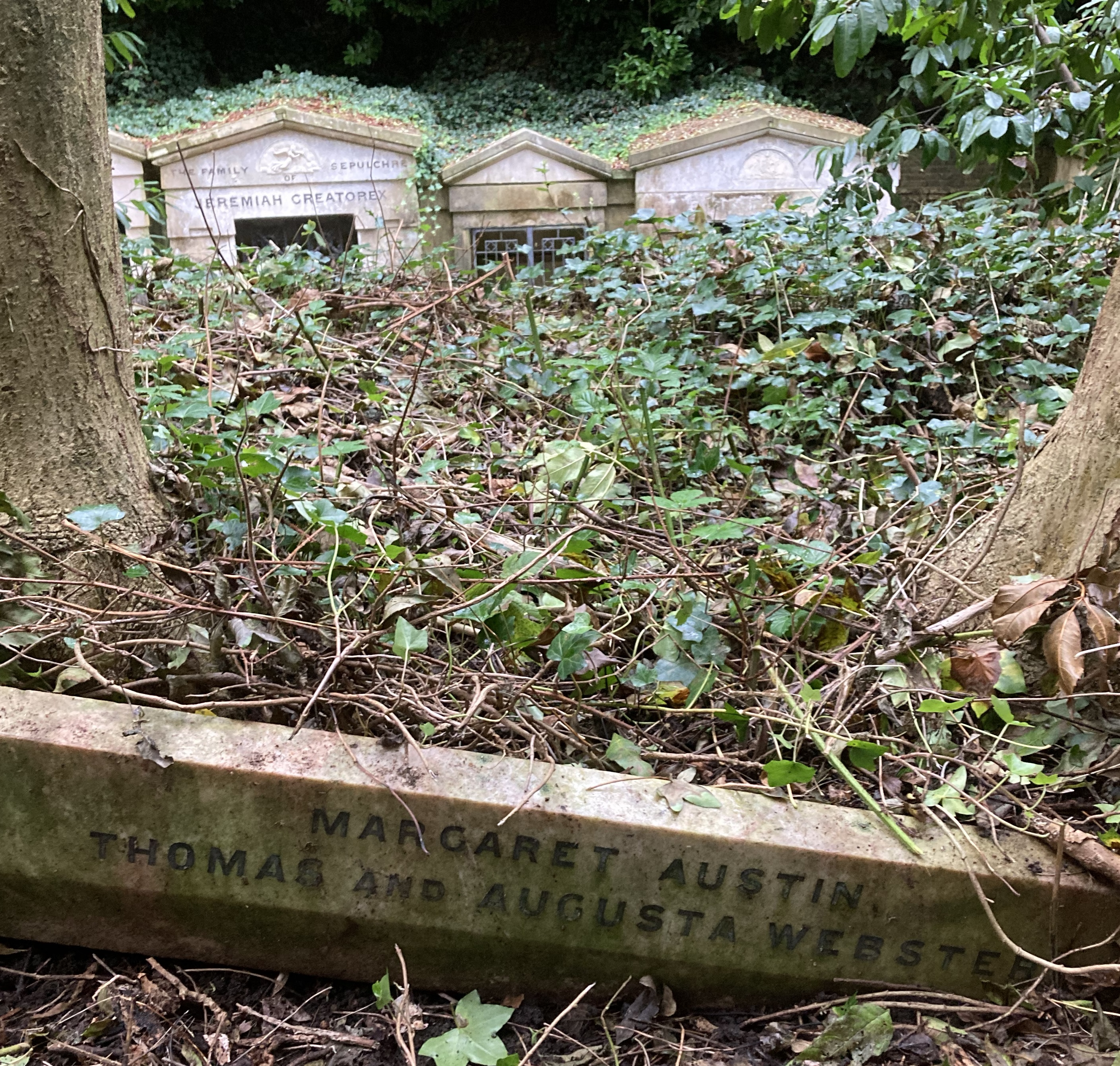
Grave of Augusta Webster in Highgate Cemetery

She was buried on the western side of Highgate Cemetery. Her grave (plot no.8187), which is situated above the cuttings catacombs, has suffered badly from tree roots.

== Literary works ==
Poetry

- Blanche Lisle: And Other Poems. 1860
- Lilian Gray. 1864
- Dramatic Studies. 1866
- A Woman Sold and Other Poems. 1867
- Portraits 1870
- A Book of Rhyme 1881
- Mother and Daughter 1895

Translations into verse

- Prometheus Bound 1866
- Medea 1868
- Yu-Pe-Ya's Lute. A Chinese Tale in English Verse. 1874

Plays

- The Auspicious Day 1874
- Disguises 1879
- In a Day 1882
- The Sentence 1887

Novels

- Lesley's Guardians 1864
- Daffodil and the Croaxaxicans: A Romance of History 1884

Essays

- A Housewife's Opinions 1878
