= Arthur Brett (poet) =

Arthur Brett (d. 1677?) was an English poet.

== Life ==
Brett was, according to Anthony Wood, "descended of a genteel family". Having been a scholar of Westminster, he was elected to a studentship at Christ Church, Oxford, in 1653. He proceeded B.A. in 1656 and M.A. in 1659. He was one of the Terræ filii in the act held in St. Mary's Church, 1661, "at which time he showed himself sufficiently ridiculous".

Having taken orders, he became vicar of Market Lavington, Wiltshire, but he seems after a while to have given up the living. He went up to London, where fell into poverty, begging from gentlemen in the streets, especially from Oxford men. He was somewhat crazed, according to Wood, who met him by chance in 1675, and was perhaps annoyed by his importunity, for he writes with some bitterness of him. Brett was a great pretender to poetry.

He died in his mother's house in the Strand "about 1677". Wood said he did not know "where his lean and macerated carcase was buried, unless in the yard of St. Clement's church, without Temple Bar" (i.e. St Clement's, Eastcheap).

== Writings ==
Brett wrote:

- A Poem on the Restoration of King Charles II (1660) included in Britannia rediviva.
- Threnodia, on the Death of Henry, Duke of Gloucester (1660)
- Poem on the Death of the Princess of Orange (1660)
- Patientia victrix, or the Book of Job in Lyric Verse (1661)

He is also said to have written an essay on poetry.
