= Thomas Tod Stoddart =

Scottish polymath

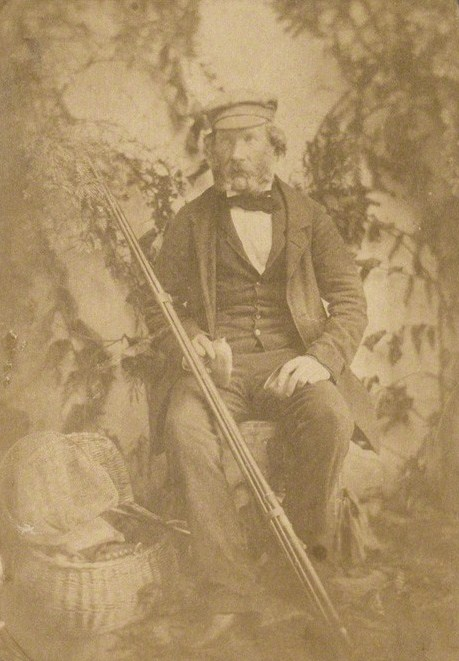
Thomas Tod Stoddart, 1858 photo

Thomas Tod Stoddart (14 February 1810 –24 November 1880) was a Scottish angler, lawyer, and poet. Although qualified to the Scottish Bar he gave up practice for writing and recreation. He lived on the river Tweed and published Angler's Companion (1847) among other works. He sought the protection of the fish and the rivers.

== Life ==
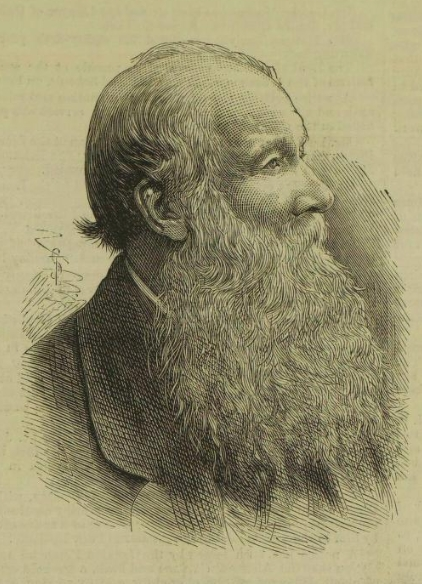

Stoddard was born on 14 February 1810 in Argyle Square, Edinburgh, the third son of Frances (née Sprot), daughter of James Sprot, and Captain (later Rear Admiral) Pringle Stoddart RN who had served under Lord Howe in Egypt. The Border family name came from "stout hearts". At the age of ten he was sent to a Moravian Church school in Lancashire; then returned to attend Edinburgh High School and the University of Edinburgh. He received an award for a poem on idolatry at the age of sixteen. One of his university teachers was John Wilson, in whose house Stoddart met Thomas De Quincey, Hartley Coleridge, James Hogg the Ettrick Shepherd, William Edmonstoune Aytoun, James Frederick Ferrier, Henry Glassford Bell, and other men of letters.

In 1833 Stoddart was admitted a member of the Faculty of Advocates, but never practised the law. An early passion for angling became the main business of his life. He investigated the haunts and habits of fish, and was an adept of fly-making.

Stoddart campaigned against the pollution of rivers. In the decade leading up to the Rivers Pollution Prevention Act 1876 (39 & 40 Vict. c. 75) he was involved with the Tweed Commissioners, and was involved in the trials and surveys of the fish population of the River Tweed using smolt.

His niece was the New Zealand artist, Margaret Stoddart, daughter of his brother Mark Pringle Stoddart.

== Bibliography ==
With expertise in fly fishing, Stoddart published books, poems and articles on angling.

- The Death-wake, or, Lunacy: a Necromaunt in Three Chimeras (1831), verse. Reprinted in 1895 by John Lane with an introduction by Andrew Lang.
- The Art of Angling as Practised in Scotland (1835)
- Angling Reminiscences (1837)
- Songs and Poems (1839) - Songs of the seasons, and other poems (1873)
- The Angler's Companion to the Rivers and Lochs of Scotland (1847, 1853)
- An Angler's Rambles and Angling Songs (1866)

== Family ==
In 1836 Stoddart married Bessie Macgregor, daughter of a farmer at Contin in Ross-shire, whom he met while on a fishing tour, and they settled at Kelso. They had two sons and a daughter Anna Stoddart, who became the biographer of her father and also of John Stuart Blackie.
