= Thomas Beedome =

English poet (??–c.1641)

Thomas Beedome (died c.1641) was an English poet. He appears to have died at an early age, and of his life nothing is known.

== Works ==
Beedome was the author of a short volume of verses, posthumously published in 1641 under the title of Poems Divine and Humane. The collection was edited by Henry Glapthorne, the dramatist and poet, who prefixed a short prose address "to the reader", which is followed by commendatory verses of Ed. May, Glapthorne (in English and Latin), W. C[hamberlaine ?], Em. D. (two copies), H. S., H. P., R. W., J. S., Tho. Nabbes, and Fran. Beedome (the author's brother).

The chief poem in the collection is entitled The Jealous Lover, or the Constant Maid, in six-line stanzas. Songs, epistles, epigrams, elegies, and devotional poems follow. Two epigrams are addressed "to Sir Henry Wotten, Knight", another is in praise of George Wither. There are also epigrams "to his deare friend William Harrington" "to the heroicall Captaine Thomas James" (two), and "to the memory of his honoured friend, Master John Donne, an Eversary".

The poetaster Henry Bold seems to have thought well of Beedome's poems, for the first fifty pages of his Wit a Sporting, 1657, are taken verbatim from Beedome's book. A copy of commendatory verses by Beedome is prefixed to Robert Farley's Light's Morall Emblems, 1638.
