= Margaret Stoddart =

New Zealand artist (1865-1934)

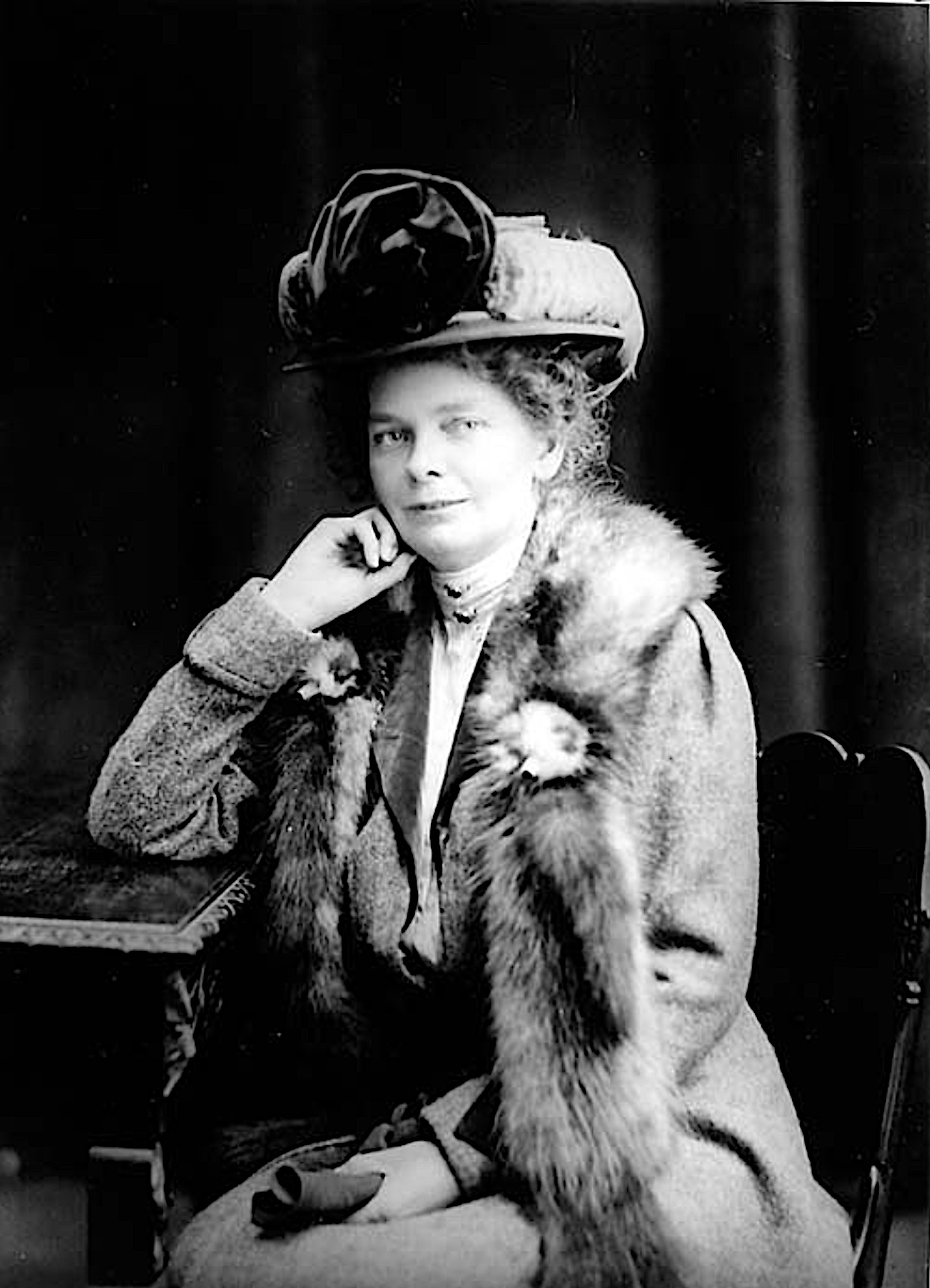
- Stoddart c. 1910
- Born: 3 October 1865; Diamond Harbour, New Zealand
- Died: 10 December 1934 (aged 69); Hanmer Springs, New Zealand
- Education: University of Canterbury School of Fine Arts, Christchurch
- Known for: flower and landscape painting

Margaret Olrog Stoddart (3 October 1865 – 10 December 1934) was a New Zealand artist best known for her depictions of flowers and landscapes.

== Early life and education ==
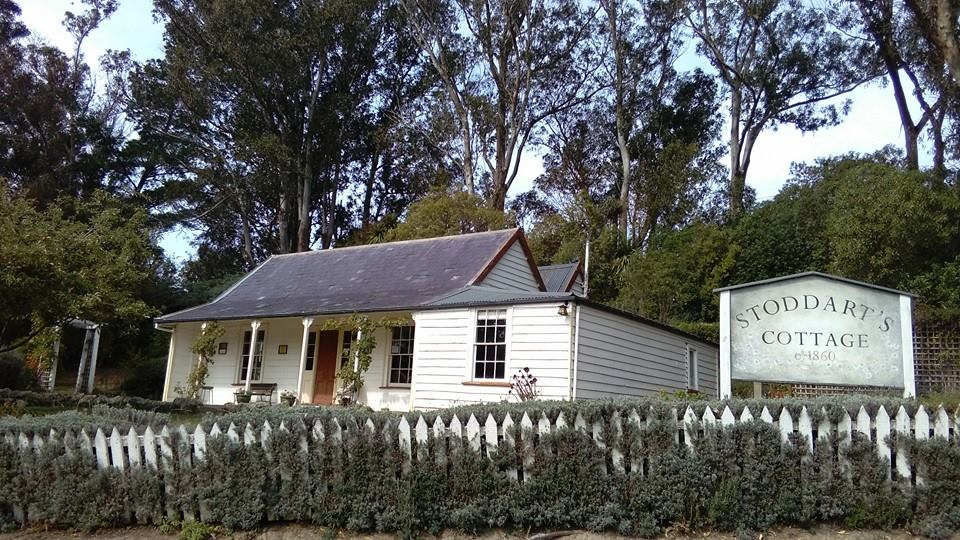
Stoddart Cottage, Diamond Harbour, where Stoddart was born

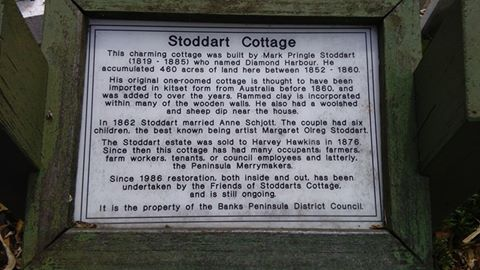
Plaque at Stoddart Cottage, Diamond Harbour

Stoddart was born in Diamond Harbour, Canterbury, New Zealand in 1865, one of six children born to Mark Pringle Stoddart (1819-1885) and Anna Barbara (née Schjott). Her grandfather (Mark Stoddart's father) was Admiral Pringle Stoddart, a British Royal Navy officer. Her uncle was the Scottish poet Thomas Tod Stoddart. The family moved back to Scotland in 1876, and Stoddart attended Edinburgh Ladies' College there. When she was 14 her family returned to New Zealand, moving to Fendalton in Christchurch.

When the Canterbury College School of Art (now known as the Ilam School of Fine Arts) opened in 1882, Stoddart enrolled, and completed her studies in 1890. She was awarded the Second Grade Full Certificate. During this period she became a member of the Palette Club, an association of artists who were committed to working from nature.

== Career ==
Stoddart began establishing a reputation as one of the country's foremost flower painters, and in 1885 was elected to the council of the Canterbury Society of Arts. In 1886 and 1891 she visited friends in the Chatham Islands. There she recorded the islands vegetation. Her travels were recorded in an album which was later presented to the Canterbury Museum.

Respected institutions began buying her work. In 1885 the Canterbury Society of Arts bought two of her flower paintings for its permanent collection. In 1890, 12 of her botanical paintings were acquired by the Canterbury Museum. She also exhibited at the Auckland Society of Arts in 1892. In 1894 she travelled to Melbourne, where with support from Ellis Rowan, the Australian flower painter, she held a successful exhibition.

Around 1898 Stoddart sailed for England. She stayed in London before moving to live at St Ives in Cornwall, at the time hosting a colony of artists. She spent over nine years painting in Europe, living not only in England, but also France and Italy. Shortly after her arrival, in 1898 or 1899, she went to Norway. She visited France and spent almost a year in Italy in 1905/06. She took lessons from Norman Garstin, Louis Grier and Charles Lasal amongst others and was strongly influenced by the Impressionist movement.

In England, Stoddart intermittently met up with Frances Hodgkins, another expatriate artist. In 1903 the two worked together in the English village of Bushey in Hertfordshire. Stoddart exhibited with the Royal Institute in London, the Society of Aquarellists in Rome, and in Paris she showed at the Salon of the Société des Artistes Français and the Société Nationale des Beaux-Arts. At an exhibition in 1902 at the Baillie Gallery, London, her work was singled out for praise by The Sunday Times. Before leaving for New Zealand she exhibited at the Royal Academy of Arts and with the Society of Women Artists.

Stoddart returned to New Zealand in November 1906 and went to live with her mother and sister. In 1913 she moved to with her family to Christchurch. Apart from a trip to Australia and Tahiti in about 1926 she remained in New Zealand for the rest of her life.

In October 1911, Stoddart exhibited fifty paintings at the Canterbury Society of Arts Gallery. The majority of these exhibited works depicted Diamond Harbour and its quaint floral cottages, marking a transition from Stoddart's previous botanical works into more painterly landscapes inspired by European Impressionists.

== Mountaineering ==
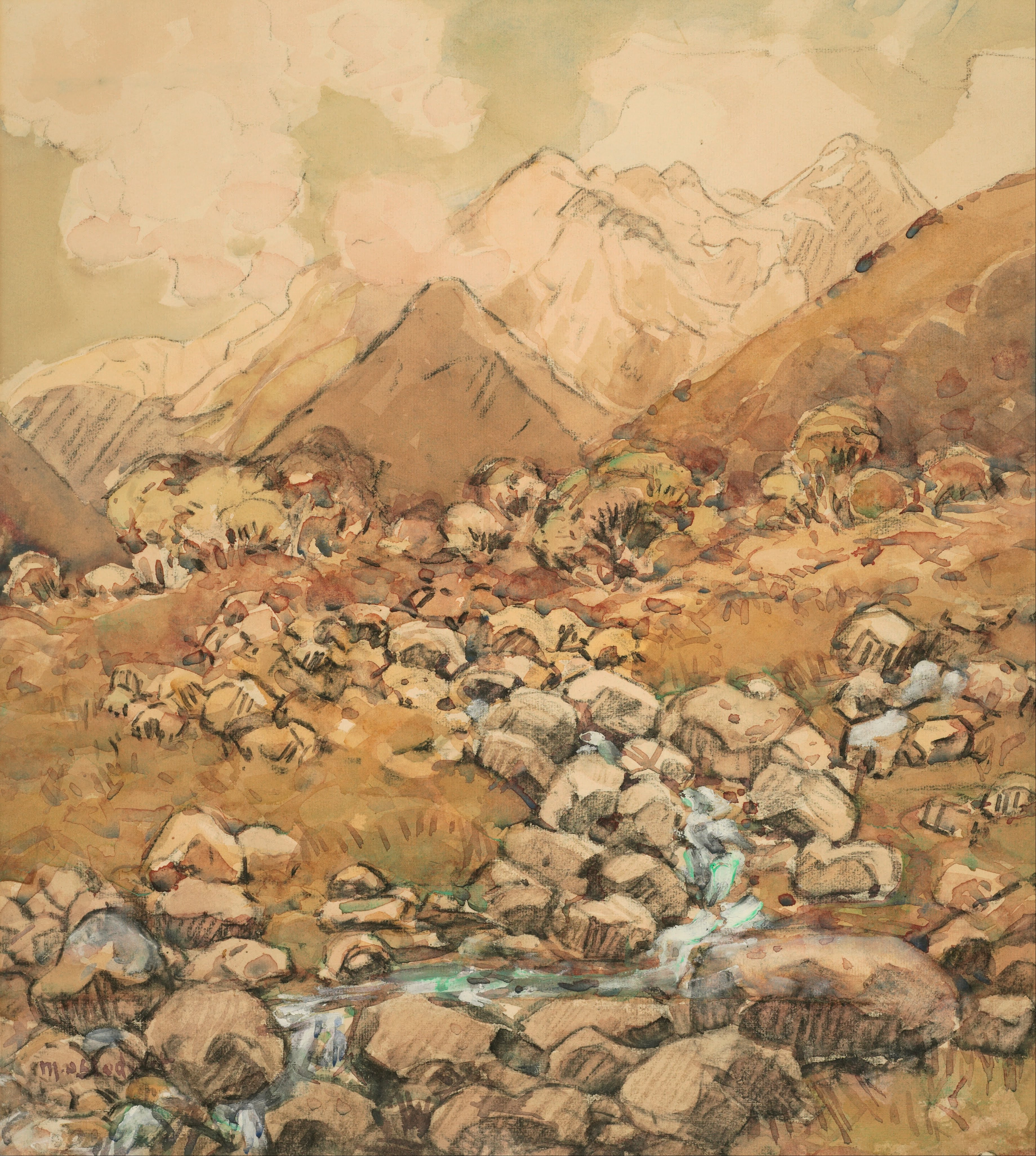
Margaret Stoddart, View of Mount Cook, c.1930. In the collection of Museum of New Zealand Te Papa Tongarewa.

Stoddart was an avid hiker and mountaineer. She recorded several of her excursions, initially painting alpine flowers and eventually focusing on the alpine landmarks themselves.

In 1895, Stoddart wrote to suffragette Rosa Dixon about her plans to hike and paint the rugged West Coast of the South Island. She was particularly interested in depicting the lilies found around the Southern Alps, eventually completing her work Mountain Lilies circa 1930.

In 1914 Stoddart moved to the Cashmere Hills, overlooking the Canterbury Plains and the Southern Alps.

== Later years and death ==
In later years Stoddart was a member of the Christchurch Sketch Club, vice president of the Canterbury Society of Arts and taught at the Canterbury College School of Art. She influenced many other younger artists through her teaching. Nelson artist Sir Toss Woollaston was one of her pupils, as was Evelyn Page.

Stoddart died in Hanmer Springs, North Canterbury, of a heart attack on 10 December 1934. Her death was marked by major retrospective exhibitions of her work in Christchurch, Wellington and Auckland in 1935.

== Gallery ==
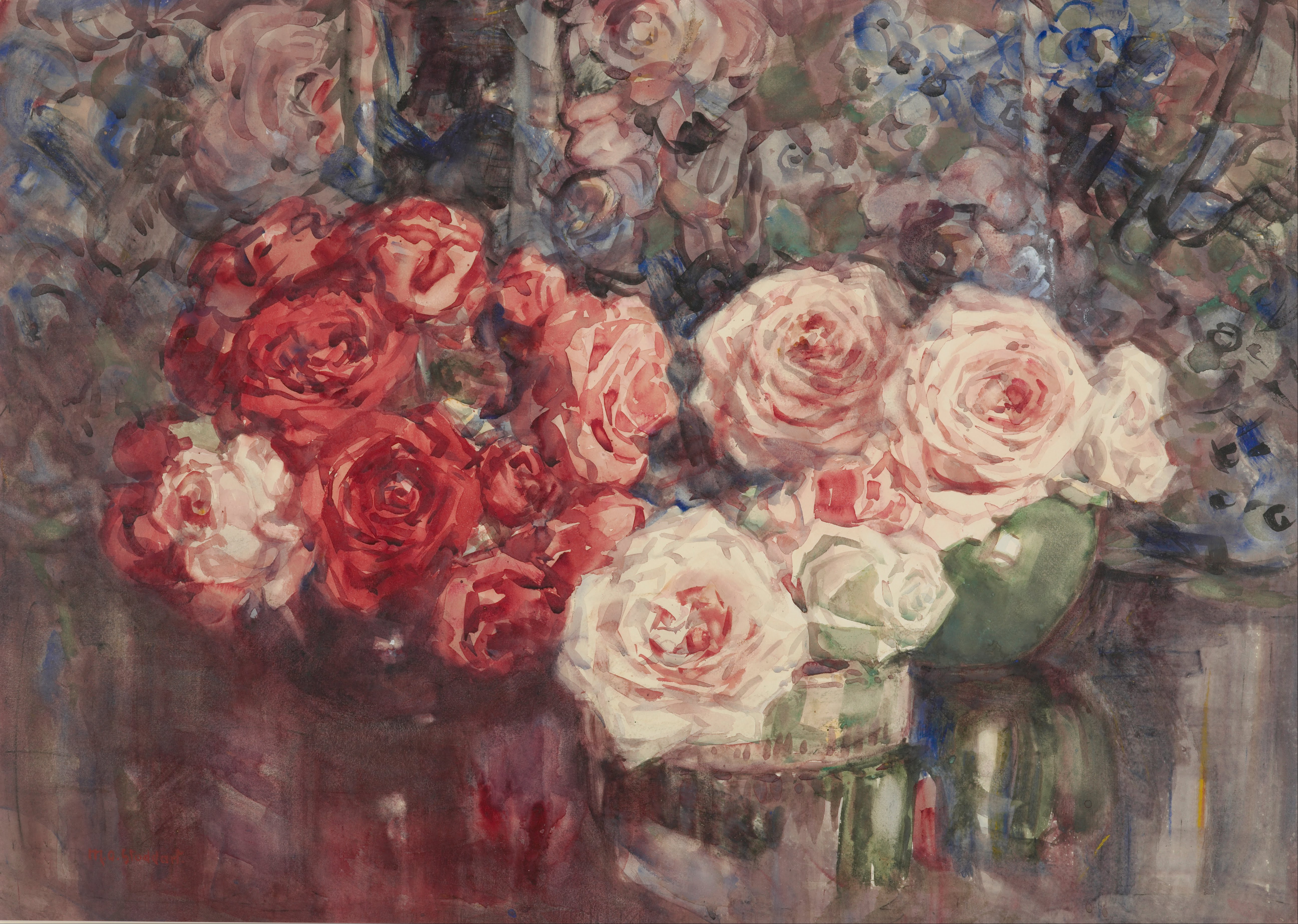
Margaret Stoddart - Roses (watercolour)

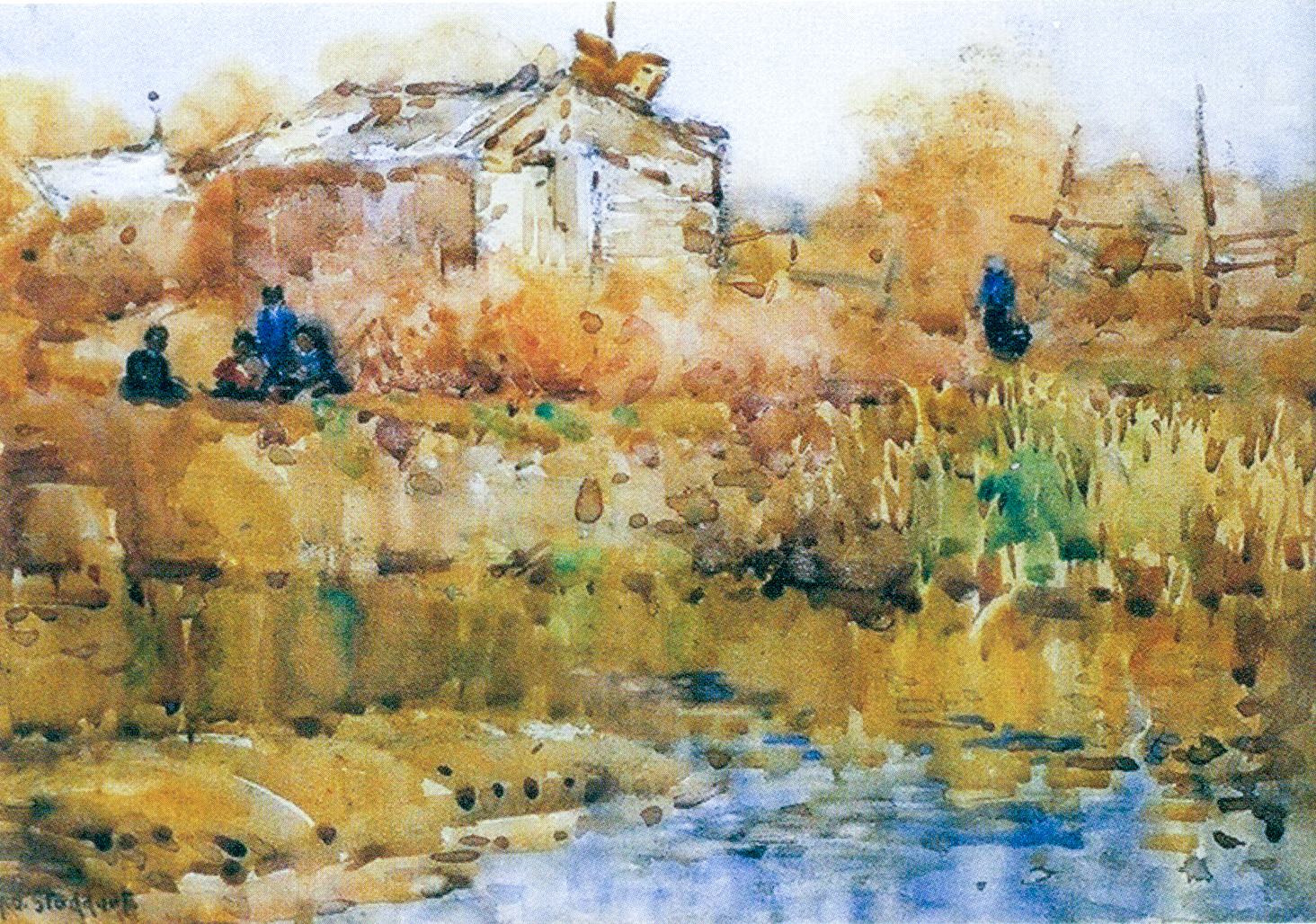
Maori Huts on the Lakefront

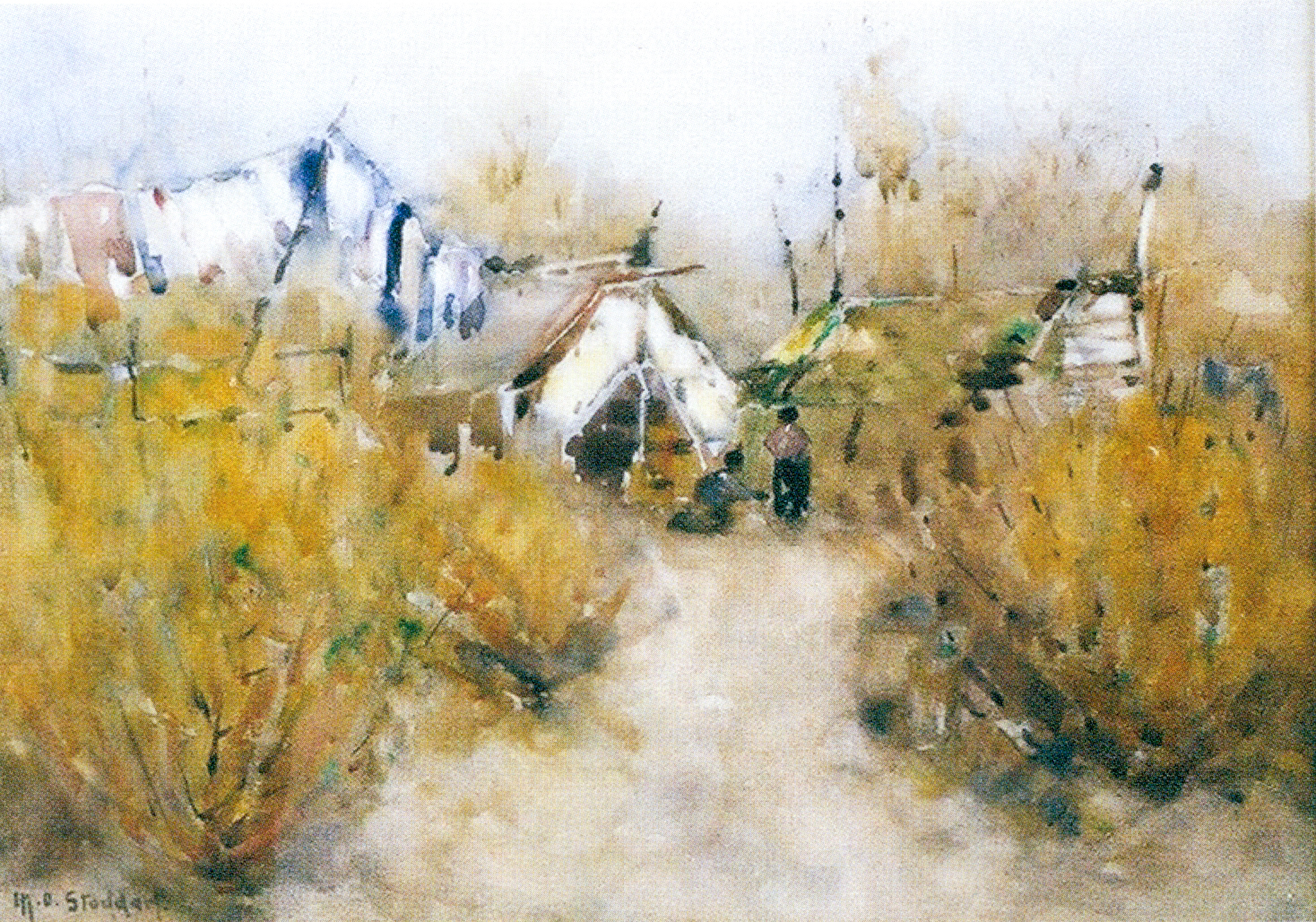
Maori camp near Rotorua
