= Thomas Moss (minister) =

British writer (1740–1808)

Thomas Moss (c. 1740–6 December 1808) was minister of Brierley Hill, and of Trentham, in Staffordshire. He received a Bachelor of Arts from Emmanuel College, Cambridge in 1761.

In 1769, he anonymously published a collection of miscellaneous poems titled "Poems on Several Occasions", forming a thin quarto, which he had printed at Wolverhampton. One piece was copied by Robert Dodsley into his Annual Register, and from thence was transferred (different persons being assigned as the author) into almost every periodical and collection of fugitive verses of the day. This poem is entitled "The Beggar" (sometimes called "The Beggar's Petition"), and contains "much pathetic and natural sentiment finely expressed". Moss published another poem in 1783, titled The Imperfection of Human Enjoyment.

He died on 6 December 1808 in Stourbridge.
