= Margaret Veley =

British author and poet

Margaret Veley (12 May 1843 – 7 December 1887) was a British writer and poet. Born in Braintree, Essex to Augustus Charles Veley and Sophia Ludbey, she was second in a family of four daughters. She never married. She died in her early forties after a short illness "caused by a chill and ending in an affection of the throat."

== Career ==
Margaret Veley's writing ranged from short and long fiction to poetry. During the 1870s and 1880s, she published short stories for magazines, three novels, and a two-volume collection of stories. After her early death, a volume of her poetry was issued. Although earlier works included elements of romance and humour, her later works were deemed melancholy and depressing, a tone which was ascribed to the premature deaths of her father and two sisters.

== Works ==
- For Percival. 1878

Having the theme womanly self-sacrifice, it appeared serially in the Cornhill Magazine. It was published in three volumes in the latter year.

- Mrs. Austin. 1880
- Rachel's inheritance; or, Damocles. 1882
- Mitchelhurst Place. 1884
- A Marriage of Shadows and Other Poems. 1888, with biographical preface by Sir Leslie Stephen.

== Sources ==
- Veley, Margaret, and Leslie Stephen. A Marriage of Shadows and Other Poems. Philadelphia: J.B. Lippincott, 1900. googlebooks Retrieved 20 May 2009
- "Veley, Margaret." British Authors of the Nineteenth Century. H.W. Wilson Co., New York, 1936
