= Dobell =

Dobell is a surname. Notable people with the surname include

- Bertram Dobell (1842–1914), English bookseller and literary scholar
- Charles Macpherson Dobell (1869–1954), Canadian soldier
- Clifford Dobell (1886–1949), British biologist
- Doug Dobell (1917–1987), British record store proprietor and record producer
- Elizabeth Mary Dobell (1828–1908), English poet
- Eva Dobell (1867–1963), British poet, nurse, and editor
- Horace Dobell (c. 1827 – 1917), English doctor and medical writer
- Richard Reid Dobell (1836–1902), Canadian businessman and politician
- Sydney Thompson Dobell (1824–1874), English poet and critic
- William Dobell (1899–1970), Australian artist

== See also ==
- Dobell Prize, prize for drawing in Australia
- Division of Dobell, an Australian electoral Division in New South Wales
