= Mischa Willett =

American poet

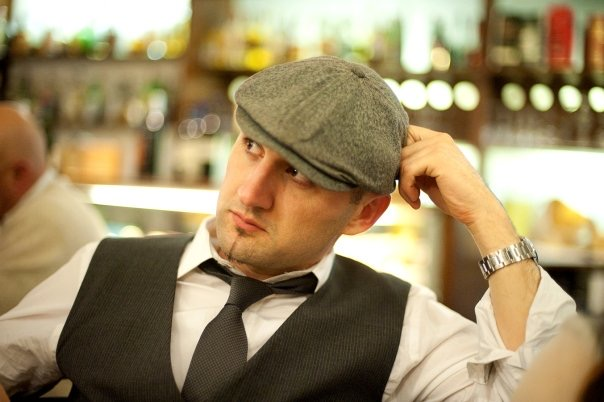
- Born: Michael David Willett; 1978 (age 47–48)
- Education: Wheaton College
- Occupation: Author
- Website: www.mischawillett.com

Mischa Willett is an American poet and essayist best known for his work in the poetic elegy and for his academic championship of the Spasmodic poets.

== Biography ==
Willett was born in Phoenix, Arizona, to a family associated with People's Church, an offshoot of the Jesus movement. His childhood was spent moving around the west coast before he attended Wheaton College (Illinois), where he studied under evangelical writers such as Leland Ryken and Alan Jacobs (academic). There he attended his first poetry readings by poets such as Li-Young Lee, Dana Gioia, and Jeanne Murray Walker.

After college, Willett moved to Flagstaff where he lived as a church sexton (office) while completing a Master of Arts degree from Northern Arizona University.

He moved back to the Pacific Northwest to complete an Master of Fine Arts degree at University of Washington under the direction of Richard Kenney (poet) and Linda Bierds. There, under the auspices of study abroad programs, he first began taking the trips to Rome that would become a recurrent feature in his poetry.

Willett stayed at University of Washington for a Ph.D. focusing on Romanticism, during which time he first began to appreciate the Spasmodic poets. While writing his dissertation, he spent a year as scholar-in-residence at University of Tübingen in Baden-Württemberg, where he gave a public poetry reading in the Hölderlinturm. There, he began work on the impressions of Rainer Maria Rilke that would form his second book, The Elegy Beta. He later taught English at Seattle Pacific University.

Willett is married to the choreographer Amber Willett. They have two children.

== Academic career ==
Willett's published research focuses mainly on British Romantic poets such as Percy Bysshe Shelley, and Spasmodic poets such as Alexander Smith, and Philip James Bailey.

== Published works ==
=== Poetry ===
Phases is a book of largely religious poems that are often ironic or humorous. It was listed among the "Best Books 2017" by the Washington Independent Review of Books. The poems have been compared stylistically to the poems of Richard Wilbur and noted for their interest in Italian culture and classical civilizations.

Willett's second book, The Elegy Beta is an extended meditation on angels as represented in The Duino Elegies by Rainer Maria Rilke. It was the first poetry book published by Mockingbird Ministries and was included among the ten best poetry books of 2020 by Relief Journal. The book has been stylistically and thematically compared to the Metaphysical poets especially John Donne, and to John Berryman.

=== Essays ===
As an essayist, Willett writes on culture and religion in venues such as The Gospel Coalition, Mere Orthodoxy, Cardus, The Curator, Front Porch Republic, and First Things.

== Bibliography ==
- Willett, Mischa. Phases. Eugene, Oregon: Cascade Books, 2017. Print. ISBN 978-1532610356
- Willett, Mischa. The Elegy Beta: and Other Poems. Charlottesville, VA: Mockingbird Ministries, 2020. Print. ISBN 978-1733716659
- Bailey, Philip James. Festus: An Epic Poem, edited by Mischa Willett, Edinburgh UP, 2021. Print. ISBN 978-1474457811
