= David Gray (poet) =

Scottish poet

David Gray (29 January 1838 – 3 December 1861) was a Scottish poet, from Merkland, Kirkintilloch. He died in his hometown aged 23. His friend and fellow poet Robert Buchanan wrote his biography in 1900.

== Life ==
The son of a handloom weaver, Gray was born at Merkland, by Kirkintilloch, Dunbartonshire. His parents resolved to educate him for the Free Kirk, and through their self-denial and his own exertions as a pupil teacher and private tutor he was able to complete a course of four sessions at the university of Glasgow. He began to write poetry for Glasgow Evening Citizen and began his idyll on the Luggie, the little stream that ran through Merkland. His most intimate companion at this time was Robert Buchanan, the poet; and in May 1860 the two agreed to proceed to London, with the idea of finding literary employment.

Shortly after his arrival in London Gray introduced himself to Monckton Milnes, afterwards Lord Houghton, with whom he had previously corresponded. Lord Houghton tried to persuade him to return to Scotland, but Gray insisted on staying in London. He was unsuccessful in his efforts to place Gray's poem, The Luggie, in Cornhill Magazine, but gave him some light literary work. He also showed him great kindness when a cold which had seized him assumed the serious form of consumption, and sent him to Torquay; but as the disease made rapid progress, an irresistible longing seized Gray to return to Merkland, where he arrived in January 1861, and died on 3 December following, having the day before had the gratification of seeing a printed specimen copy of his poem The Luggie, published eventually by the exertions of Sydney Dobell. He was buried in the Auld Aisle Churchyard, Kirkintilloch, where in 1865 a monument was erected by friends far and near to his memory.

== Published work ==
The Luggie, the principal poem of Gray, is a kind of reverie in which the scenes and events of his childhood and his early aspirations are mingled with the music of the stream which he celebrates. The series of sonnets, In the Shadows, was composed during the latter part of his illness. Encyclopædia Britannica says that most of his poems necessarily bear traces of immaturity, and lines may frequently be found in them which are mere echoes from Thomson, Wordsworth or Tennyson, but they possess, nevertheless, distinct individuality, and show a real appreciation of natural beauty.

Below is a copy of a sonnet which is one of a number he wrote, entitled, "In the shadows." His description of a wet October day shows the skill of the terminally-ill poet:

October's gold is dim— the forests rot,

The weary rain falls ceaseless, while the day

Is wrapped in damp. In mire of village way

Tae hedge-row leaves are stamp'd, and, all forgot,

The broodless nest sits visible in the thorn.

Autumn, among her drooping marigolds,

Weeps all her garnered sheaves, and empty folds,

And dripping orchards – plundered and forlorn.

The season is a dead one, and I die !

No more, no more for me the spring shall make

A resurrection in the earth and take

The death from out her heart. O God, I die !

The cold throat mist creeps nearer, till I breathe

Corruption. Drop stark night upon my death !

The Luggie and other Poems, with an introduction by R. Monckton Milnes, and a brief memoir by James Hedderwick, was published in 1862; and a new and enlarged edition of Gray's Poetical Works, edited by Henry Glassford Bell, appeared in 1874. See also David Gray and other Essays, by Robert Buchanan (1868), where he also has an essay on Walt Whitman. Buchanan also has a poem on David Gray, in Idyls and Legends of Inverburn. Parts of "The Luggie" have been narrated against a backdrop of the Luggie Water. The eponymous anthology is available and is out of copyright.

David Gray's self penned epitaph was:

Below lies one whose name was traced in sand-

He died not knowing what it was to live:

Died while the first sweet consciousness of manhood

And maiden thought electrified his soul:

Faint beatings in the calyx of the rose.

Bewildered reader, pass without a sigh

In a proud sorrow!

There is life with God,

In other kingdom of a sweeter air:

In Eden every flower is blown: Amen.

27 September 1861.
