= William Edmondstoune Aytoun =

Scottish poet, lawyer and professor

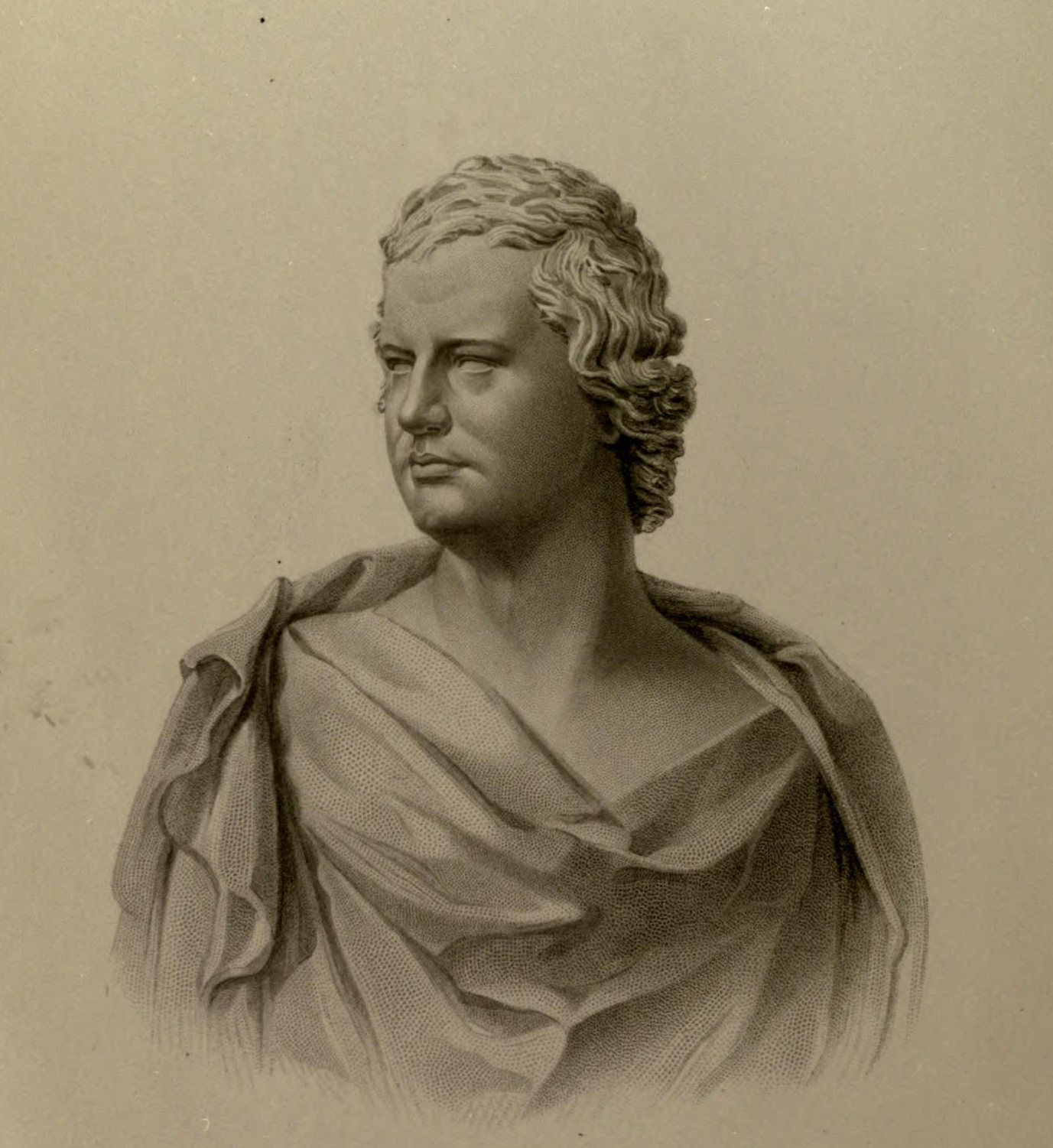
- Engraving by J.C. Armytage from the bust of Aytoun by Scottish sculptor Patric Park
- Born: 21 June 1813; 21 Abercromby Place, Edinburgh
- Died: 4 August 1865 (aged 52); Blackhills, by Lhanbryde, Moray
- Resting place: Dean Cemetery, Edinburgh
- Education: Edinburgh Academy (1824-8); Edinburgh University
- Occupations: Writer to the Signet (1835); Advocate (1840); Professor of Rhetoric and Belles Lettres, Edinburgh University (1845–65); Sheriff, Orkney & Shetland (1852–65)
- Spouse(s): Jane Emily Wilson (died 1859); Fearnie Jemima Kinnear (m. 1863) (died 1904)
- Children: No issue
- Relatives: Father-in-law: Professor John Wilson; Brother-in-law: John Thomson Gordon
- Writing career
- Notable work: Lays of The Scottish Cavaliers (1848)

William Edmondstoune "W. E." Aytoun FRSE (21 June 1813 – 4 August 1865) was a Scottish poet, lawyer by training, and professor of rhetoric and belles lettres at the University of Edinburgh. He published poetry, translation, prose fiction, criticism and satire and was a lifelong contributor to the Edinburgh literary periodical Blackwood's Magazine. He was also a collector of Scottish ballads.

In the early 1850s, Professor Aytoun lent his name as a supporter of the fledgling National Association for the Vindication of Scottish Rights. His distinctive legacy as a teacher has led to him being called the 'first modern professor of English Literature'.

== Early life and education ==
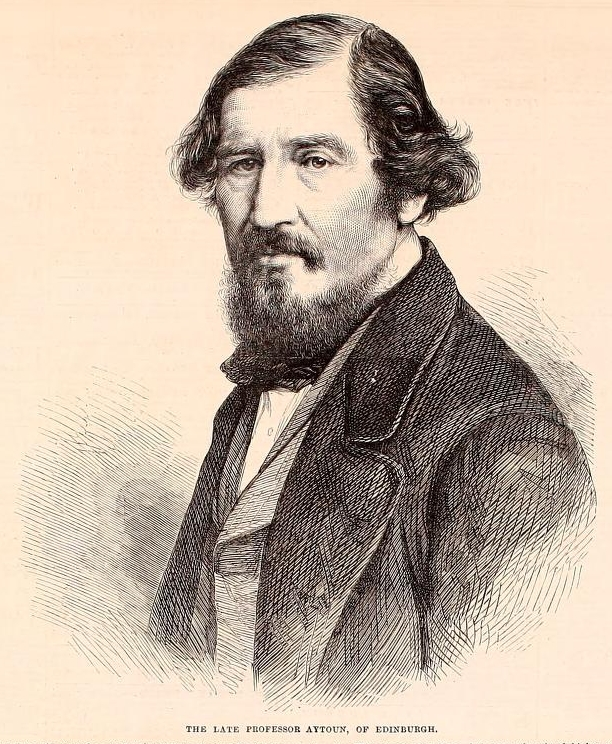

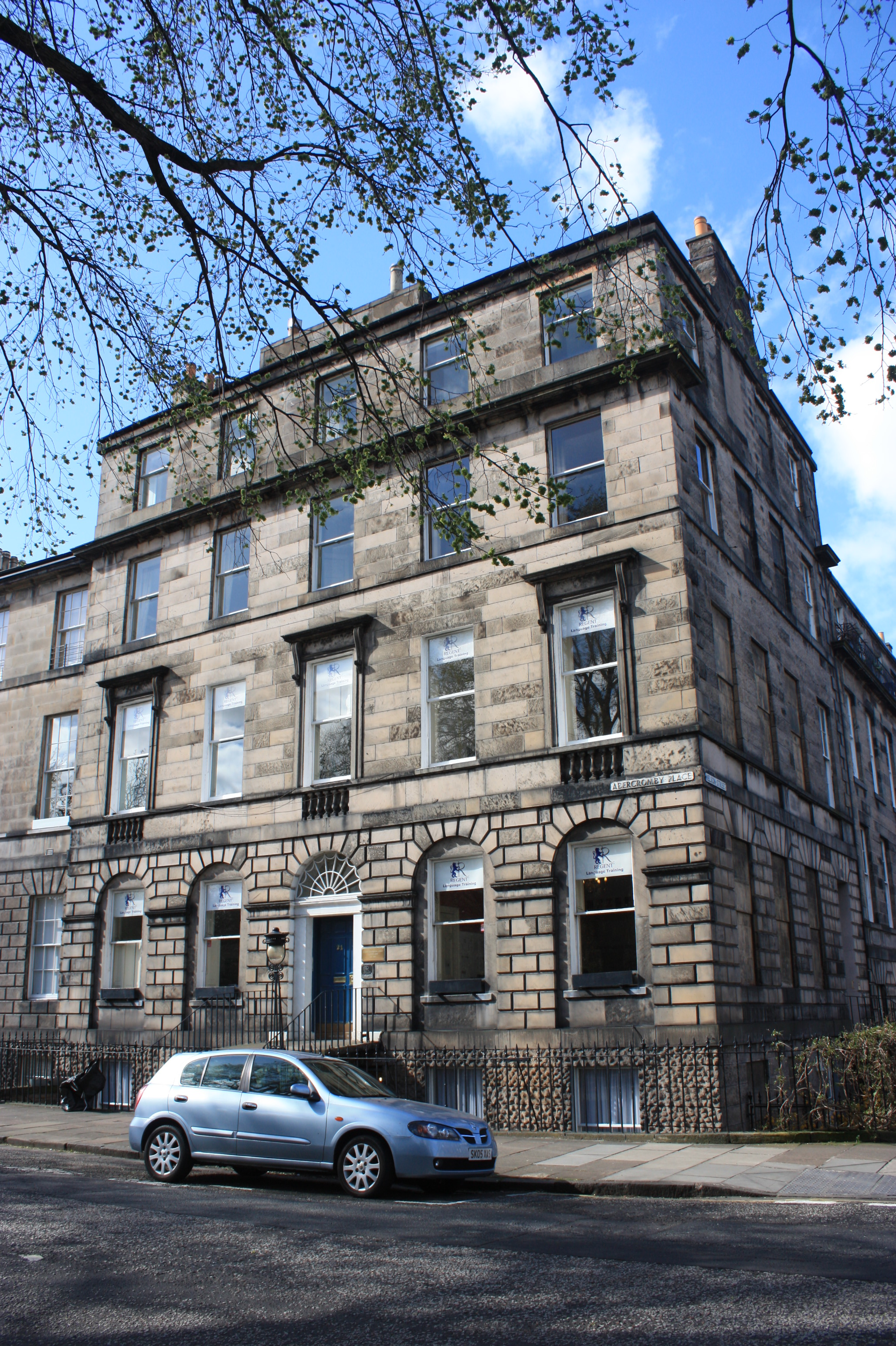
21 Abercromby Place, Edinburgh, birthplace of William Edmondstoune Aytoun

Aytoun was born at 21 Abercromby Place in the New Town of Edinburgh, the only son of Joan Keir (1771–1861) and Roger Aytoun WS (1769–1843), Director of Chancery of Scotland. His parents were both Episcopalians. To his mother, a woman of culture, he owed his early fondness for literature (including ballad poetry), his political sympathies, and his admiration for the House of Stuart. He also counted poet Sir Robert Aytoun (died 1638) among his relatives.

At the age of eleven years William was sent to the Edinburgh Academy, and subsequently entered the University of Edinburgh.

== Travels and writings ==
Aytoun published his first book, Poland, Homer, and other Poems, in 1832, at the age of 19. This work expressed fervent concern for the cause of Poland. In 1833, he journeyed to London where he spent a few months studying law, but decided in September of that year to travel on to Aschaffenburg where he studied German. While in Germany he made a blank verse translation of the first part of Goethe's Faust; but it was never published, forestalled by other translations. He remained in Germany until April 1834.

On returning to Scotland, Aytoun resumed his legal studies in his father's chambers. He was admitted a writer to the signet in 1835, and five years later certified a Scottish lawyer. By his own confession, though he followed the law, he never could "overtake" it.

Aytoun was a contributor to the Edinburgh literary periodical Blackwood's Magazine, beginning in 1836 with the magazine's acceptance of his translations from Uhland. In 1839 he joined the staff of Blackwood's, an association which he maintained until the end of his life. His contributions to the periodical included humorous prose stories, such as The Glenmutchkin Railway, How I Became a Yeoman, and How I Stood for the Dreepdaily Burghs, a partly autobiographical novel, Norman Sinclair, and the work upon which his reputation as a poet is chiefly based, his Lays of the Scottish Cavaliers (1848).

In around 1841, Aytoun became acquainted with Theodore Martin, and in association with him wrote a series of humorous articles on the fashions and follies of the time, in which were interspersed the verses which afterwards became popular as the Bon Gaultier Ballads (1855).

His reputation as a keen satirist is also demonstrated by his dramatic verse Firmilian, a Spasmodic Tragedy, or The Student of Badajoz (1854) under the nom-de-plume of T. Percy Jones, a mock-tragedy in which he parodied the poems of the Spasmodic poets. It was intended to satirise a group of poets and critics, including George Gilfillan, Sydney Thompson Dobell, Philip James Bailey, and Alexander Smith. His parody played a decisive role in ending the vogue for such works.

== University appointment and political affiliations ==
In 1845, Aytoun was appointed professor of rhetoric and belles lettres at the University of Edinburgh. His lectures attracted large numbers of students, raising the attendance from 30 to 150.

His services in support of the Tory party, especially during the Anti-Corn-Law struggle, received official recognition with his appointment in 1852 as Sheriff of Orkney and Shetland, a role he served for 13 years.

In 1853 Aytoun supported the National Association for the Vindication of Scottish Rights, sharing a platform as speaker with Lord Eglinton at the two defining public meetings held on behalf of the Association that year in Edinburgh and Glasgow.

== Freemasonry ==
Ayntoun was initiated into Scottish Freemasonry in Lodge Canongate Kilwinning, No. 2, on 9 March 1836. He served as Master of that Lodge for 1839.

== Family life ==
William Aytoun was married to Jane Emily Wilson, the daughter of Professor John Wilson (Christopher North). She died in 1859 and he then remarried, his second wife being Fearnie Jemima Kinnear, who died in 1904. He had no children by either wife.

== Death ==
He died at home, 16 Great Stuart Street on the Moray Estate, on 4 August 1865.

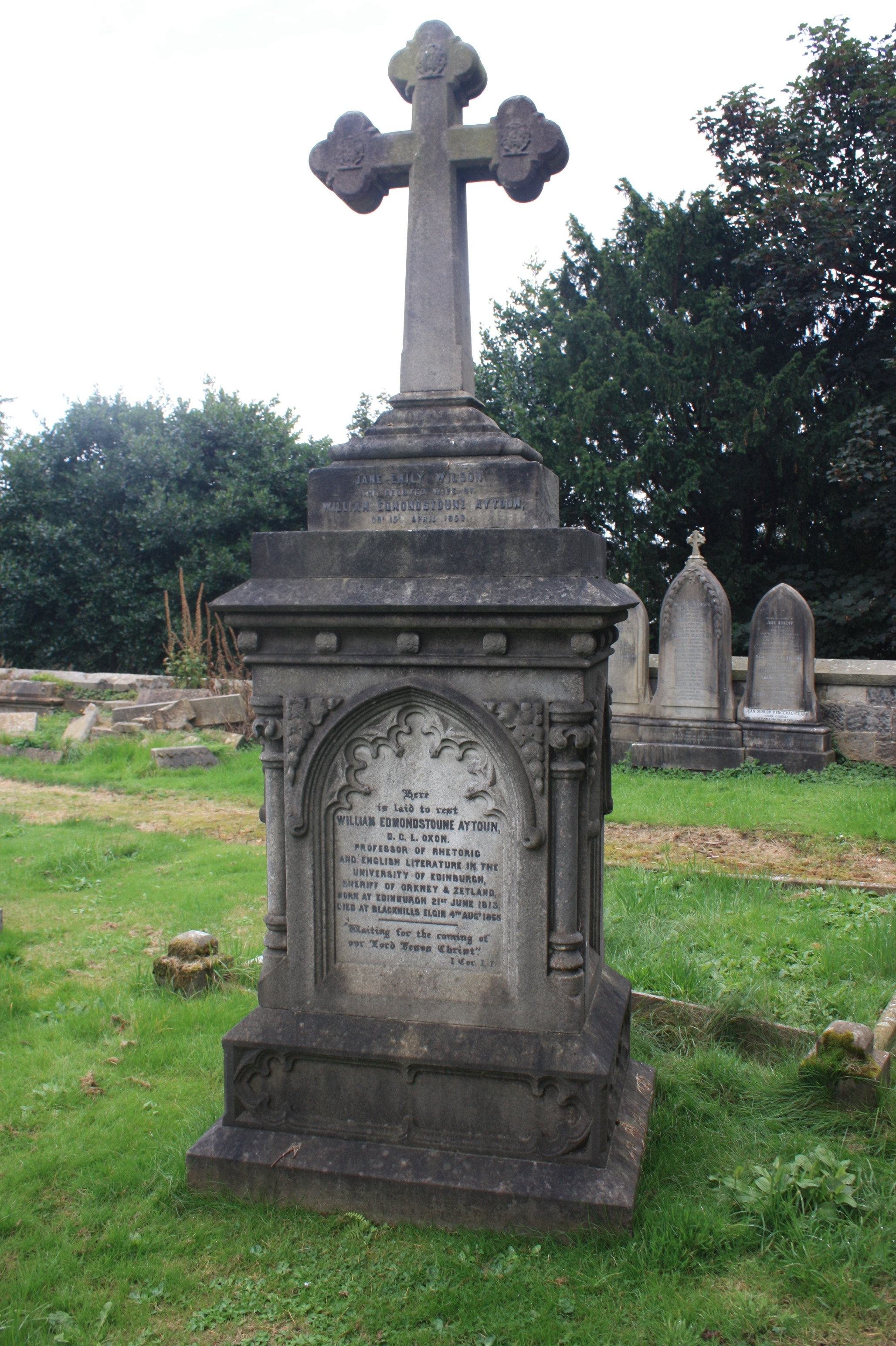
William Edmondstoune Aytoun's grave, Dean Cemetery

He is buried close to Professor Wilson in the south section of Dean Cemetery in Edinburgh.
