= Thomas Bailey (topographer) =

English topographer and writer (1785–1856)

- Born: 31 July 1785; Nottingham, England
- Died: 23 October 1856 (aged 71); Basford, Nottingham, England
- Burial place: Basford Old Cemetery
- Occupations: Historian, silk hosier, wine merchant, newspaper proprietor, local politician
- Notable work: Annals of Nottinghamshire
- Political party: Liberal
- Movement: Pro-reform
- Spouse(s): MarieAnne Taylor (1790/1791-1818), Katherina Carver (1825-1860)
- Children: Philip James Bailey (son), 3 daughters
- Father: Philip Bailey

Thomas Bailey (31 July 1785 – 23 October 1856) was an English topographer and writer.

== Biography ==
Bailey was born in Nottingham on 31 July 1785. His father, Philip Bailey, was Nottingham Town and County Gaoler for twenty years until 1820. Prior to his appointment, Bailey Sr. was engaged in the hosiery trade. Bailey Jr.'s education was received partly in a day school in his native town, and partly in a boarding school at Yorkshire. For a short while afterwards he continued his father's silk hosiery business, before entering the wine trade, in which he eventually prospered. In 1832, he was trading as a vintner from Wheeler Gate.

Politically liberal, he came forward in 1830 as a candidate for the representation of the borough of Nottingham, though was ultimately unsuccessful. In 1836, he was elected to the town council, and he continued to be a member for seven years. From 1845 to 1846, he became proprietor and editor of the Nottingham Mercury, but his opinions were considered too temperate by his readers. The circulation of the paper declined, and in 1851 the mass of subscribers withdrew in protest at Bailey's views respecting the original error of the Ecclesiastical Titles Act, and his prophecies of its inevitable failure. The newspaper was declared bankrupt the next year.

In 1830, he purchased a mansion at Basford, near Nottingham, where he spent the later years of his life, engaged in literary pursuits and in the formation of a collection of books and engravings.

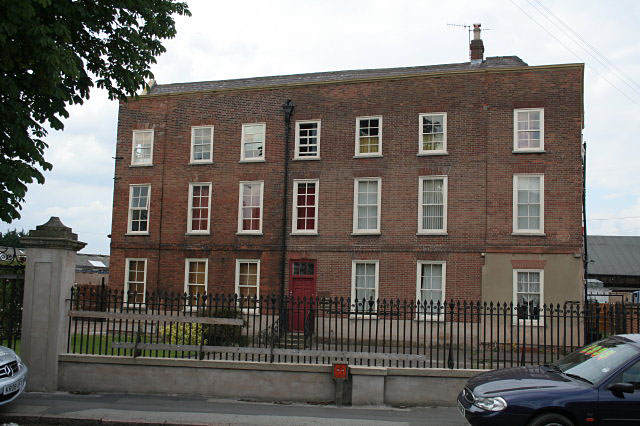
Basford House/Manor House, 59, 61 & 61A Church Street, where Thomas Bailey compiled his Annals of Nottinghamshire

To commemorate the passing of the Reform Act in 1832, Bailey erected a vase-surmounted 13 ft-long (4 m) Grecian column, in the grounds of Basford House. When the property was sold, the column was removed and re-erected across the road in the Old Basford Cemetery in memory of his friend, Richard B. Spencer, who was buried nearby. The column has disappeared, but the memorial inscription on the base is still legible.

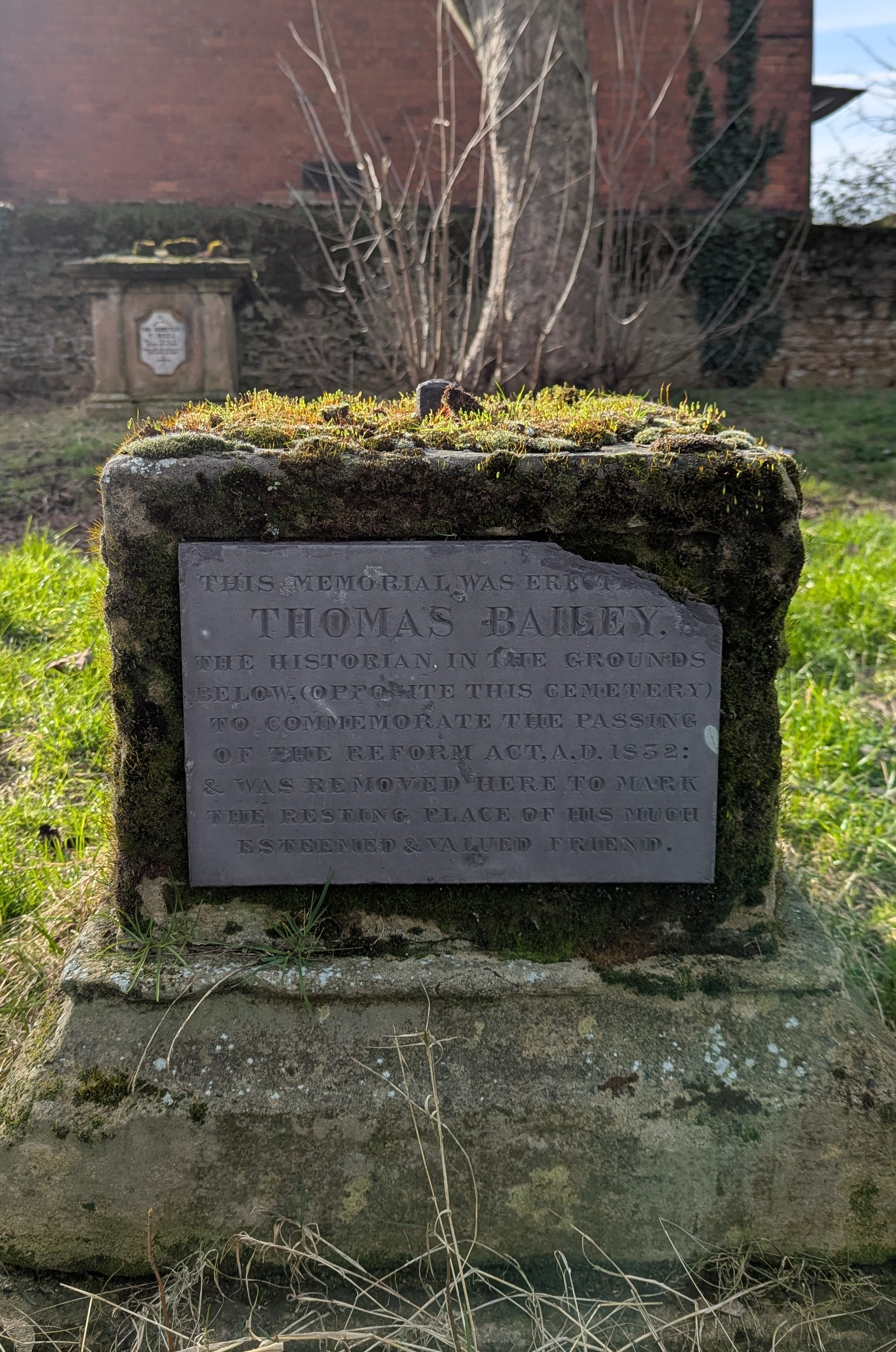
Thomas Bailey’s commemoration stone for the Reform Act of 1832 in Old Cemetery, Old Basford

He died at Basford on 23 October 1856. His son, Philip James Bailey, is the author of Festus and of other poems.

== Publications ==
1. 'What is Life? and other Poems,' Lond., 1820, 12mo.
2. 'The Carnival of Death,' a poem, Lond., 1822, 16mo.
3. 'A Sermon on the Death of Byron,' 1824.
4. 'Ireton,' a poem, Lond. 1827, 8vo.
5. 'Discourse on Political Revolutions,' 1830.
6. 'Recreations in Retirement,' a miscellany of poetry and prose, 1836.
7. 'The Rights of Labour,' a pamphlet, 1844.
8. 'The Advent of Charity and other Poems,' Lond. 1861, 16mo.
9. 'Annals of Nottinghamshire; a new and popular history of the county of Nottingham, including the borough,' 4 vols., Lond. 1852–55, 8vo, his most important publication.
10. 'Village Reform: the great social necessity of Britain.' being a letter to Lord Palmerston, Lond. 1854, 12mo.
11. 'Handbook to Nottingham Castle,' Lond. 1854, 8vo.
12. 'Handbook to Newstead Abbey,' Lond. 1855, 12mo.
13. 'Records of Longevity; with an introductory discourse on Vital Statistics,' Lond. 1857, 8vo.
