= Richard Allen (publisher) =

19th-century publishers

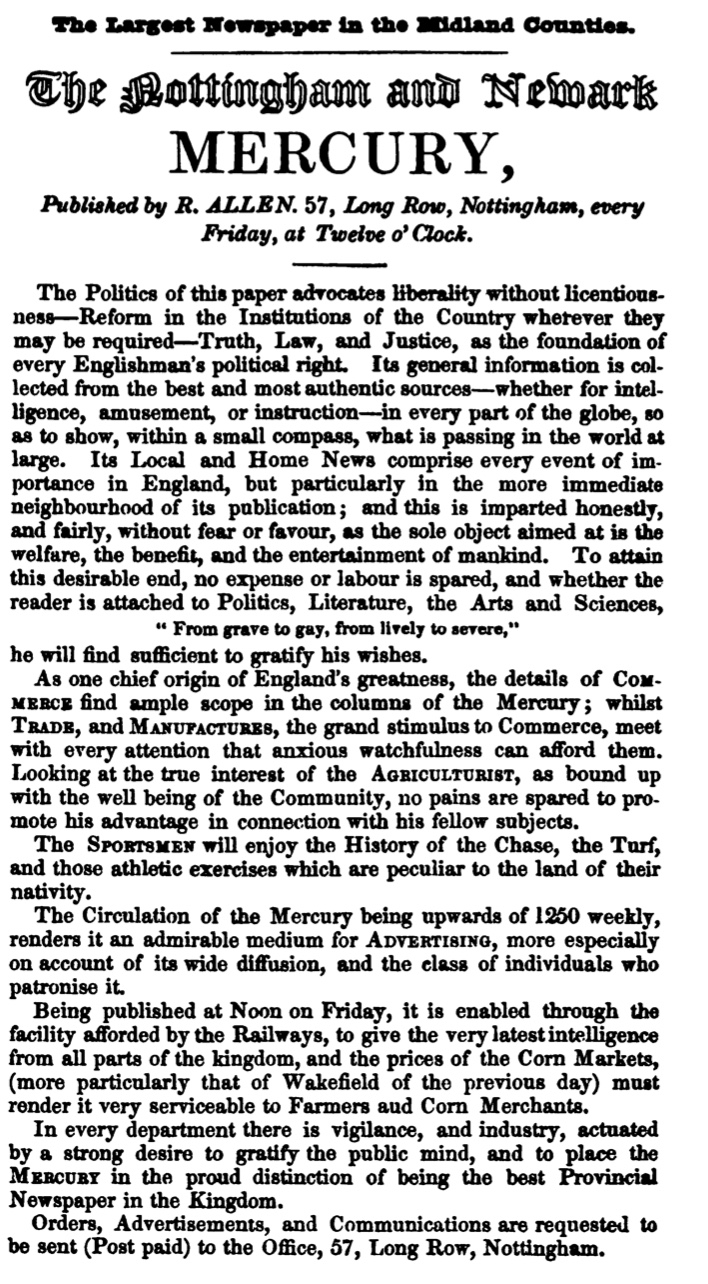
Nottingham and Newark Mercury published by Richard Allen

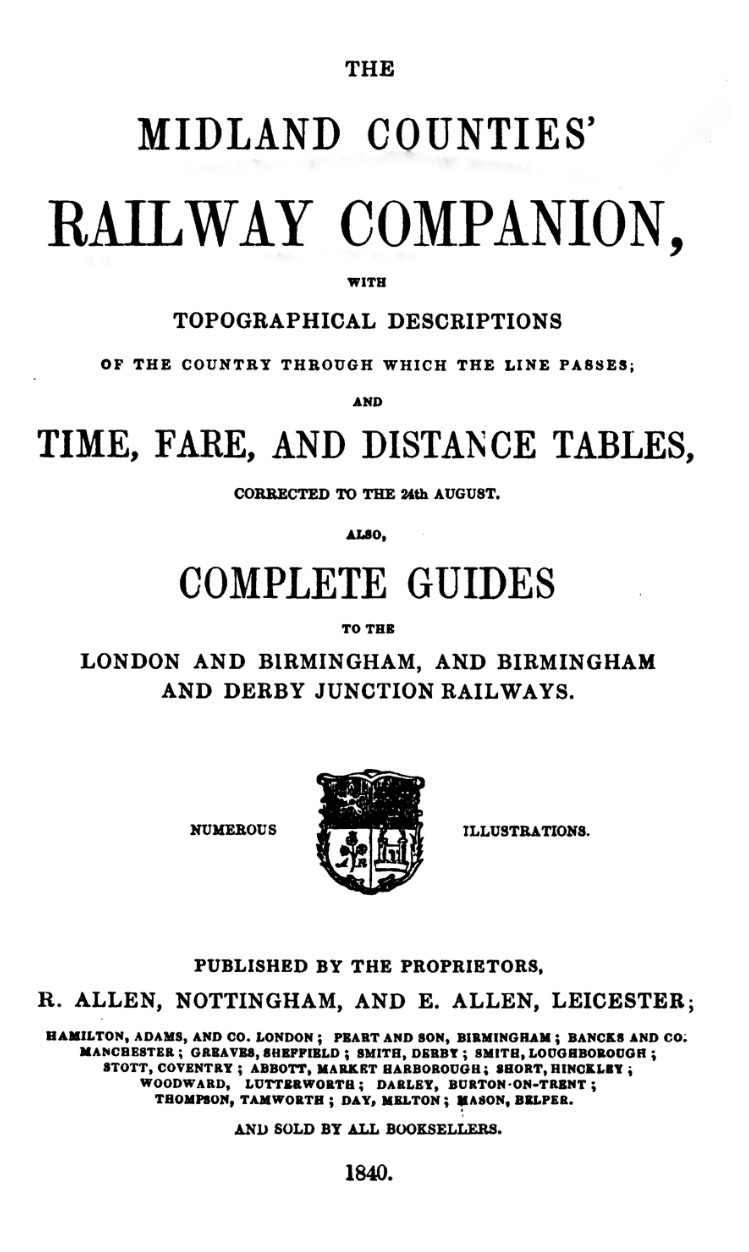
Title page of the Midland Counties' Railway Companion published by Richard Allen of Nottingham and Edward Allen of Leicester 1840

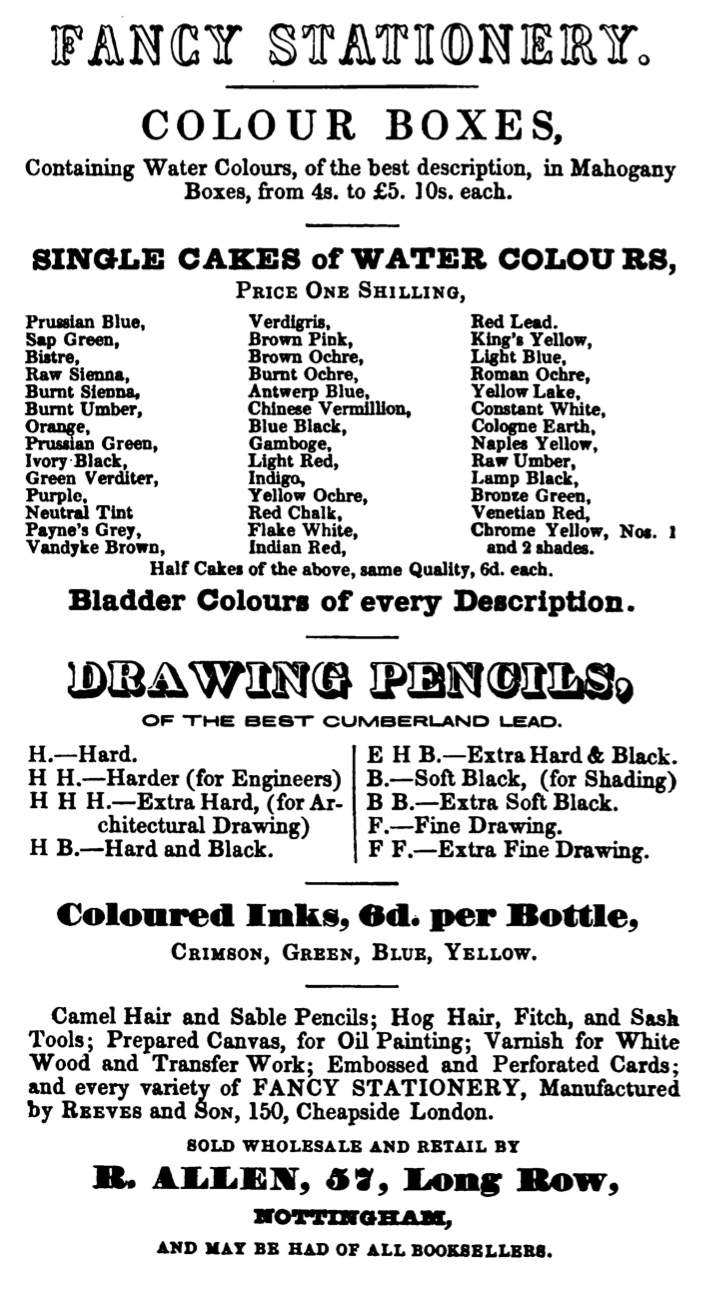
Advertisement for R. Allen in the Midland Counties' Railway Companion of 1840

Richard Allen (1814 - 16 February 1884) was a stationer and publisher in Nottingham.

== Background ==
He was born on 29 December 1814, the son of Edward Allen (1788-1863) of Leicester and Sarah Townsend (1792-1941).

He married firstly Catherine Morris (1816 - 2 October 1837) and they had one child.

- Sarah Elizabeth Allen (1837-1929)

He married secondly Mary Ann Small (1810 - 1900), eldest daughter of William Small, on 12 July 1838 at Skirbeck and they had two children:

- Edward Henry Allen (1840 - 1875)
- Mary Adelaide Allen (1841 - 1901)

He took an active part in the establishment of the Park Company of the Robin Hood Rifles. He was also Provincial Grand Secretary of the Nottingham Freemasons.

He died on 16 February 1884 at his house Albert Villa, 21 Cavendish Crescent South, The Park, Nottingham and left an estate valued at £34,611 9s 1d. (equivalent to £3,718,500 in 2025).

== Business interests ==
He succeeded to the business of Samuel Bennett in 1836, printer and publisher, based on Long Row in Nottingham and until 1847 issued the Nottingham and Newark Mercury, later shortened to the Nottingham Mercury, which was the organ of the Whig party in Nottingham.

He was based at Caxton House Photographic Studio, 34 Long Row, Nottingham and produced many Carte de visite for local people.

In June 1860 he installed a steam engine and Cameron’s patent boiler to power the printing presses and insured it with the Steam Boiler Assurance Company of Manchester On 10 December, the insurance company sent its inspector who discovered considerable leakage and corrosion but deemed the boiler safe to continue to use until Christmas when repairs could be made. On 14 December the boiler exploded but the insurance company refused to pay out which led to a Nisi prius court case in 1864 from which Richard Allen was awarded £58 (equivalent to £6,400 in 2025) in damages.

Later in life he converted his stationery and book-binding business into a limited liability company and he retired from the active management of it, but remained a director up until his death.

== Publications ==
- Allen’s Midland Counties’ Railway Companion 1840
- Rules and Regulations to be observed by the Enginemen, Guards, Policemen and others employed on the Midland Railway 1842
- The History and Antiquities of Charnwood Forest. With an Appendix on the Geology, Botany, and Ornithology of the District. Authors J.B. Jukes; Rev. Andrew Bloxam and Churchill Babington 1842
- Allen’s Railway Time Table
- Memoir of the late John Wolley. Author Alfred Newton 1860
- Allen's Illustrated Hand-Book and Guide, to ... Nottingham and its Environs 1866
- Red Book of Local Institutions 1867 onwards
- History of Old Trent Bridge, With a Descriptive Account of the New Bridge, Nottingham. Illustrated by Photographs. author Marriott Ogle Tarbotton 1871
- A souvenir of Newstead Abbey 1874
- Nottingham Past and Present by Frederick Smeeton Williams 1877
- Great Midland Almanack
- Book of hunting songs and sport collected by Mrs Chaworth Musters 1885
