= Hugh MacDonald (journalist) =

Scottish journalist (1817–1860)

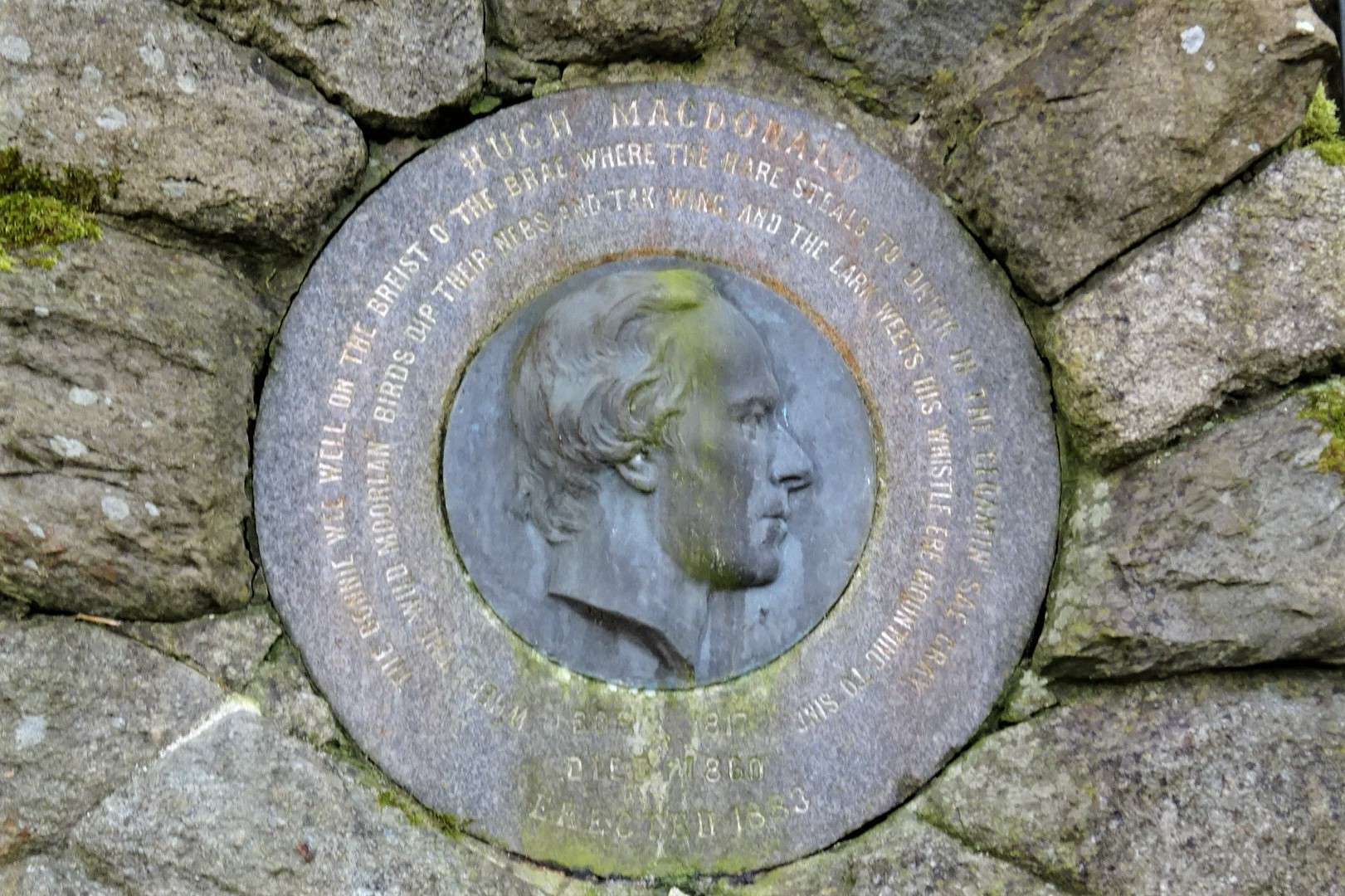
Profile relief of MacDonald at drinking fountain monument on the Gleniffer Braes

Hugh MacDonald (4 April 1817 – 16 March 1860) was a Scottish journalist, poet and author from Glasgow. He wrote for the newspaper the Glasgow Citizen for many years under the pen name 'Caleb'. He is best known for his book Rambles Round Glasgow, published in 1854 by Thomas Murray and Son; a version with modern footnotes was published in 2023.

== Life ==
MacDonald was born on Rumford Street in Bridgeton, Glasgow on 4 April 1817. He was one of 11 children. His parents had moved from the Highlands to find work in the Glasgow textile industry, and MacDonald's father worked as a dyer in the Monteith and Company works in the Barrowland area. MacDonald started work as a 'tearer' (junior assistant) at the same factory at the age of seven. He was apprenticed to a block printer at the Barrowfield calico-printing works and briefly ran a grocer's shop in 1848. When the shop failed, he worked as a block printer for Harrow, McIntyre and Co. of Colinslie, Paisley. He initially continued to live in Bridgeton and walked to Paisley for work each day, before temporarily relocating to the Renfrewshire town.

MacDonald was a member of the City Club, a literary and artistic gathering which met in the Bank Tavern in Glasgow, and was a founder member of the Ramblers Association.

After around 1840 MacDonald moved into writing. He was a supporter of the Chartist movement and initially wrote poetry and articles for Chartist publications such as the Chartist Circular. In 1847 he came to public attention when he wrote a letter to the Glasgow Citizen defending the poetry of Robert Burns against an attack by Rev. George Gilfillan of Dundee. MacDonald was a great enthusiast for Burns and quoted him extensively in his writing.

James Hedderwick, who was editor of the Glasgow Citizen, then invited him to write for the paper. MacDonald joined the staff of the paper in 1849. He wrote articles under the pen name Caleb, many of them of on social or political issues, but it was his series of Glasgow travelogues, published over a period of three years, for which he became well known. These 'rambles' in the countryside around Glasgow were collected into a book, Rambles Round Glasgow, in 1854, which MacDonald dedicated to Hedderwick. The book was very popular and went through several editions. MacDonald followed it up in 1857 with Days at the Coast, a travelogue of locations on the Firth of Clyde, which was also well received.

MacDonald became sub-editor of the Glasgow Citizen. He later went on to write for the Glasgow Morning Journal and the Glasgow Sentinel, and edited the Glasgow Times.

MacDonald married twice. His first wife, Agnes, died within a year of their marriage along with their newborn child. His second wife, Alison, had been a bridesmaid at Agnes and Hugh's MacDonald's wedding. Agnes had no living children but Alison had one son and four daughters with Hugh MacDonald.

MacDonald became ill in spring 1860 after an expedition to Castlemilk to research his planned book, Footsteps of the Year. He died on 16 March 1860 at the age of 42 and is buried in the Southern Necropolis. He was survived by his wife Alison and their five children.

== Publications ==
- Rambles Round Glasgow, 1854
- Days at the Coast, 1857
- Poems and Songs of Hugh MacDonald, 1864

== Memorials ==
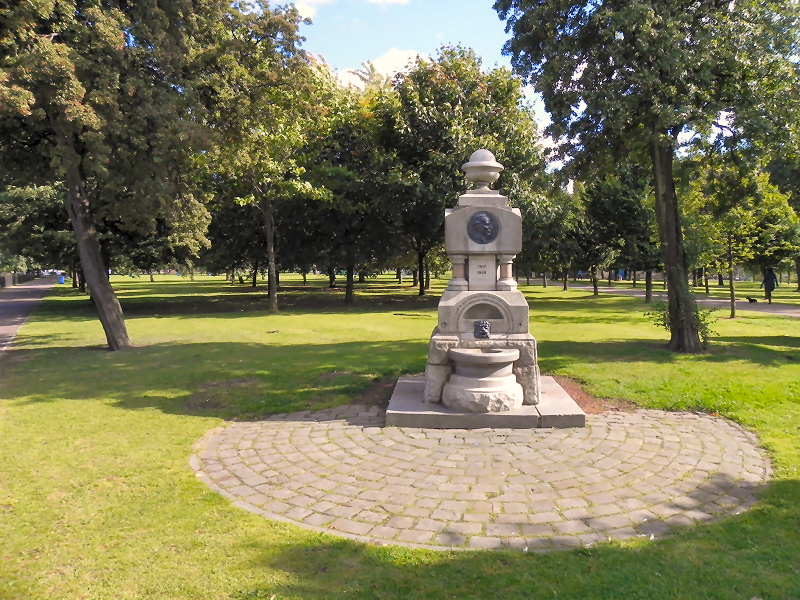
Drinking fountain monument to MacDonald at Glasgow Green

- There is a memorial fountain for MacDonald on Glasgow Green, the location of his first 'ramble'. This originally stood on Gleniffer Braes, Paisley, but was moved to Glasgow Green in 1881. The fountain was designed by John Mossman and paid for by the Glasgow Ramblers Club.
- A memorial water stoop stands on Gleniffer Braes, Paisley, the location of another 'ramble'. It was erected in 1883 by the Paisley Old Weavers Society.
- One of the entrances to Glasgow Green is known as 'Hugh MacDonald's Gate'. It is situated at the corner of King's Drive and Arcadia Street. A paving slab at that gate commemorates his book Rambles Round Glasgow.
