= James Grant (1822–1887) =

Scottish novelist

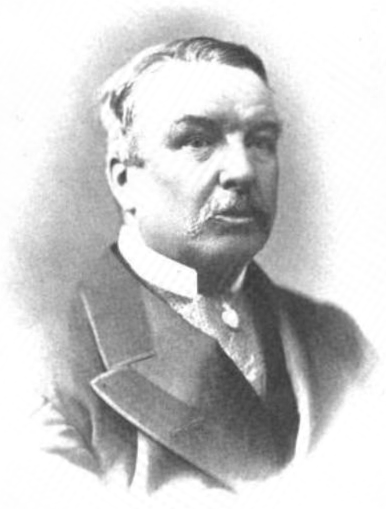
- Born: 1 August 1822; Edinburgh, Scotland
- Died: 5 May 1887 (aged 64); London, England
- Burial place: St Mary's Catholic Cemetery, Kensal Green
- Occupation: Writer

James Grant (1 August 1822 – 5 May 1887) was a Scottish novelist and miscellaneous writer.

Grant was born in Edinburgh, Scotland, and was a distant relation of Sir Walter Scott. He was a prolific author, writing some 90 books, including many yellow-backs. Titles included Adventures of an Aide-De-Camp, One of "The Six Hundred", The Scottish Musketeers and The Scottish Cavalier. Many of his 56 novels are about important characters and events in Scottish history.

In 1853 he founded the National Association for the Vindication of Scottish Rights.

== Biography ==
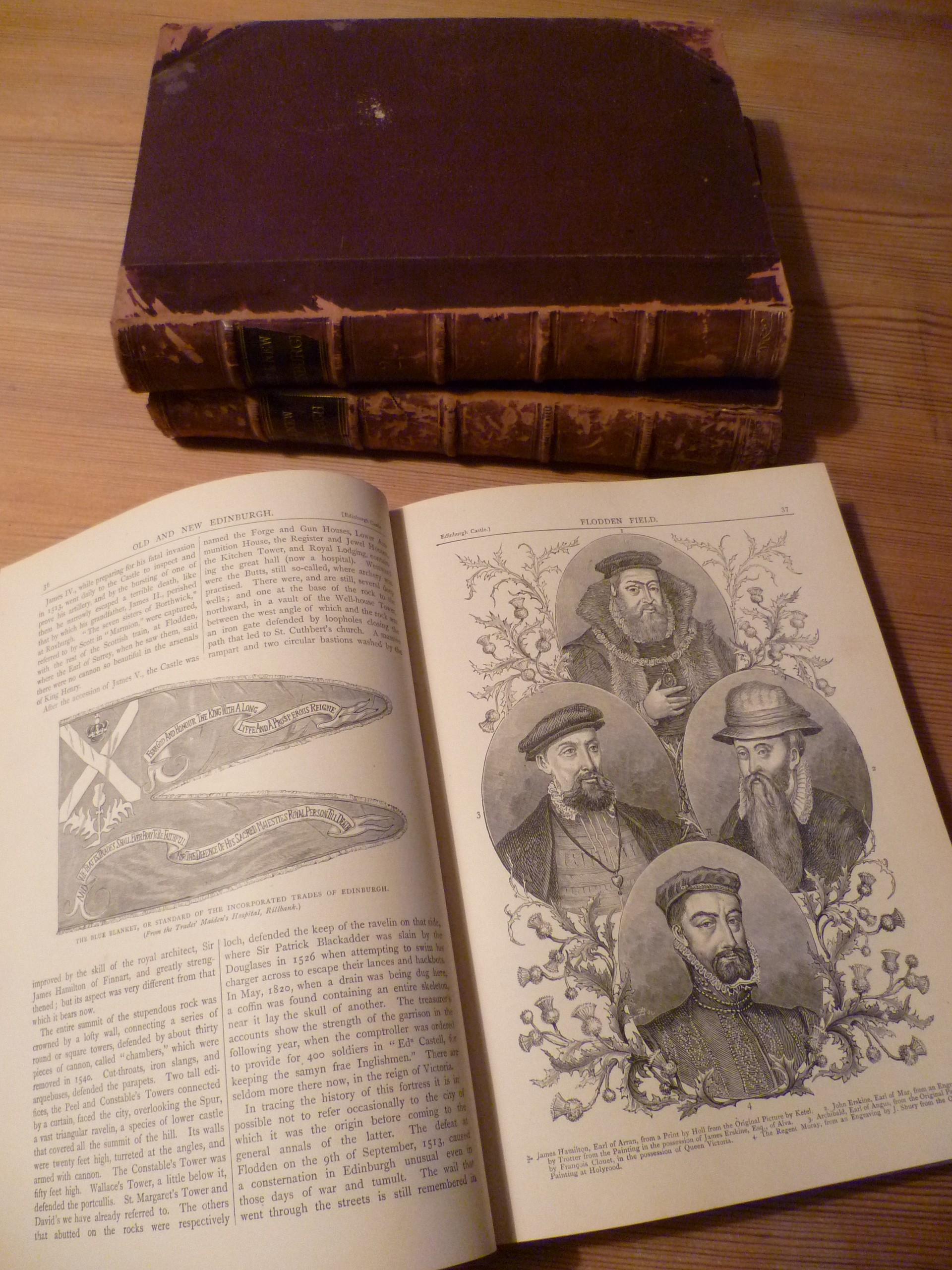
James Grant's Old And New Edinburgh, published in 1880

=== Early life ===
Grant was born in Edinburgh on 1 August 1822. He was the eldest son of John Grant, a captain in the 92nd Gordon Highlanders, and his wife, the eldest daughter of Captain Andrew Watson of Overmains. His paternal grandfather was James Grant of Corrimony (1743–1835), an advocate and Jacobite sympathiser. Through his mother he was related to Sir Walter Scott.

His father, Captain John Grant, had served with distinction in the Peninsular War. After his wife's death, he obtained a command in Newfoundland, sailing there in 1833 along with his three sons. After spending six years in American barracks James returned home with his father, who had resigned his command.

In 1840, through the influence of Lord Hill, under whom Captain Grant had served in Spain, James Grant was gazetted to an ensigncy in the 62nd Foot, and joined the provisional battalion at Chatham. He was appointed to command the depot, but in 1843 resigned his commission and entered the office of Mr. Rhind, architect, Edinburgh.

=== Writing career ===
Although Grant became a skilled draughtsman, he also developed an interest in writing and went on to devote himself to writing novels. His first novel, The Romance of War (1845), describes adventures of the Gordon Highlanders in the Peninsula War. It was based on anecdotes he heard from his father. Thanks in part to its accurate descriptions of battles, it enjoyed significant sales, although Grant only received £20 for the work.

In 1846 he published a sequel, The Highlanders in Belgium, followed by The Adventures of an Aide-de-Camp in 1848, which equalled that of his first novel in popularity. It was followed by The Yellow Frigate, Bothwell, and Jane Seton. From then on he produced at least one novel per year, with often two and even three works in varying stages of production at any one time. His last works of fiction were Love's Labour Won (1888), dealing with incidents of Burmese dacoity, and Playing with Fire (1887), a story of the war in the Sudan.

According to M. G. Watkins:

His works typically feature fast-moving plots, energetic prose, and sustained dialogue. His novels set in Scottish historical contexts draw on identifiable historical material and attempt to reconstruct past events and settings. These works depict Scottish and Border figures in ways that emphasise risk-taking behaviour, loyalty, and martial identity.

Grant also produced a substantial body of historical writing, with a primary focus on Scottish military achievements abroad. He is also known for his six-volume Old And New Edinburgh, published in 1880 by Cassell.

==== Accusation of plagiarism ====
In 1875, Captain W. Ross King claimed that Grant's novel Shall I Win Her? used certain passages from his own book Campaigning in Kaffirland. Although a comparison of the relevant passages showed the claim to be justified, Grant was absolved from blame on the basis of a novelist's right to "borrow from graver writers".

=== Other activities ===
In 1852 Grant founded the National Association for the Vindication of Scottish Rights, which was described as the "first effective Scottish Nationalist movement". He contended that England had broken the terms of the 1707 Treaty of Union and was getting very much more out of the Union than Scotland. Grant was widely ridiculed for these views by Punch and many English newspapers. He was also an energetic supporter of the volunteer movement, and was one of the first to join its ranks.

Grant was consulted by the War Office on military matters, including issues related to the territorial system. Certain proposals attributed to him were implemented, including modifications to British Army uniform facings. He was also consulted on the proposed plans for the alterations at Edinburgh Castle.

=== Family ===
Grant married the eldest daughter of James Browne, LL.D.. and had two sons: James, who died before his father, and Roderick, later a Roman Catholic priest. Grant himself had embraced the Roman Catholic faith in 1875.

According to Horsburgh, he was modest and retiring, genial, patriotic, and of strong religious leanings.

By the 1880s his popularity had declined, and he died in relative poverty on 5 May 1887 at his home in London, survived by his wife.

Grant left an estate worth around £490 which would be worth around £56,413.82 in 2026.

== Bibliography ==
Grant's writings include;

- The Romance of War (1847)
- Adventures of an Aide-de-Camp (1848)
- Memoirs and Adventures of Sir W. Kirkaldy of Grange, 1849.
- Memorials of the Castle of Edinburgh, 1850.
- Walter Fenton, or, The Scottish Cavalier (1850)
- Bothwell (1851)
- Memoirs and Adventures of Sir J. Hepburn (1851)
- Jane Seton (1853)
- Philip Rollo (1854)
- Frank Hilton, or, The Queen’s Own (1855)
- The Yellow Frigate (1855)
- Harry Ogilvie (1856)
- The Phantom Regiment (1856)
- The Highlanders of Glen Ora (1857)
- Arthur Blane (1858)
- Memoirs of Montrose (1858)
- Lucy Arden (1859)
- Legends of the Black Watch (1859)
- Mary of Lorraine (1860)
- Jack Manley (1861)
- Oliver Ellis (1861)
- The Captain of the Guard (1862)
- Dick Rodney (1863)
- Letty Hyde's Lovers (1863)
- Second to None (1864)
- The Adventures of Rob Roy (1864)
- The King's Own Borderers (1865)
- The White Cockade (1867)
- First Love and Last Love (1868)
- The Girl He Married (1869)
- The Secret Dispatch (1869)
- Lady Wedderburn's Wish (1870)
- Only an Ensign (1871)
- Under the Red Dragon (1872)
- The Cavaliers of Fortune, or British Heroes in Foreign Wars (1859); reissued with title reversed, 1873.
- British Battles on Land and Sea, 3 volumes (1873); followed in 1884 by a supplementary fourth volume Recent British Battles on Land and Sea.
- Shall I Win Her? (1874)
- Fairer Than a Fairy (1874)
- The Queen's Cadet, and Other Tales (1874)
- One of the Six Hundred (1875)
- Morley Ashton (1876)
- Illustrated History of India (1876)
- Did She Love Him? (1876)
- Six Years Ago (1877)
- The Ross-shire Buffs (1877)
- The Lord Hermitage (1878)
- Vere of Ours, the Eighth or King's (1878)
- The Royal Regiment, and Other Novelettes (1879)
- The Duke of Albany's Own Highlanders (1880)
- Old and New Edinburgh (1880), over thirty thousand copies of which were sold in the United States.
- The Cameronians (1881)
- Lady Glendonwyn (1881)
- Derval Hampton (1881)
- Violet Jermyn (1882)
- The "Scots Brigade" and Other Stories (1882)
- Miss Cheyne of Essilmont (1883)
- Jack Chaloner (1883)
- The Dead Tryst (1883)
- A Haunted Life (1883)
- The Master of Aberfeldie (1884)
- Colville of the Guards (1885)
- The Royal Highlanders (1885)
- History of the War in the Soudan, 6 volumes, (1885-6)
- The Tartans of the Clans of Scotland (1886).
- Dulcie Carlyon (1886)
- Playing with Fire (1887)
- Love's Labour Won (1888)
- Scottish Soldiers of Fortune, 1889 (posthumous).
