= Nottingham Mercury =

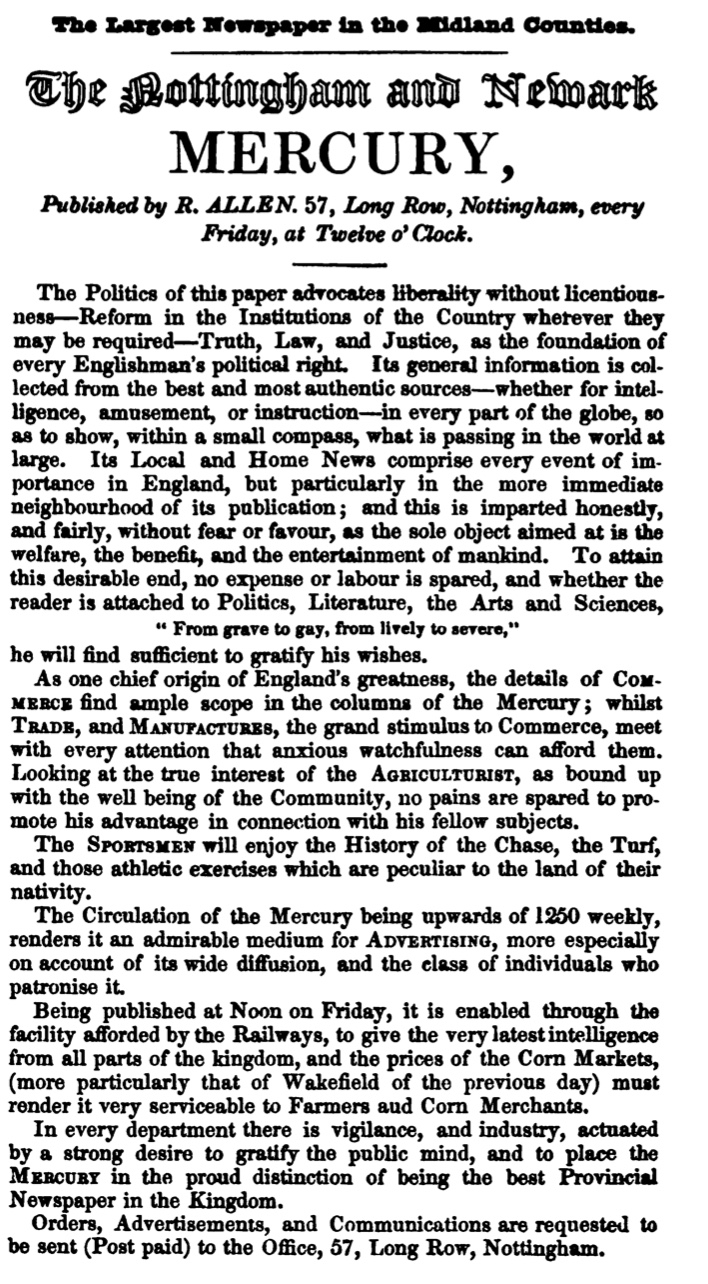
An advertisement for the Nottingham and Newark Mercury published by Richard Allen in the Midland Counties’ Railway Companion of 1840

The Nottingham Mercury was a newspaper printed in Nottingham.

== Eighteenth century ==
The first paper to use the title Nottingham Mercury was launched on 1 January 1714 by John Collyer and printed at the Hen Cross. Originally called The New Mercury it was quickly renamed the Nottingham Mercury. It was published to offer an alternative view to that in William Ayscough’s Weekly Courant but it only lasted a few years before ceasing publication around 1727.

== Nineteenth century ==
The second paper to use the title started in 1825 when Jonathan Dunn published the Nottingham Mercury from his offices on South Parade in Nottingham under its proprietor Thomas Wakefield. It struggled to gain readership so was renamed the Nottingham and Newark Mercury. From 1827 to 1838 Matthew Henry Barker was the editor. The paper was intended to promote the Whig party values of the Nottingham Corporation as the Nottingham Journal was the representative and exponent of the Tory, Church and King party and the Nottingham Review was the advocate of Liberal principles.

In 1834, Samuel Bennett succeeded Jonathan Dunn as publisher, but he died two years later in 1836 and was succeeded by Richard Allen when it changed its name to the Nottingham Mercury. In 1838 its sale was a little over 1,000 per week.

In 1847 Thomas Bailey became the sole proprietor and production was transferred to Mr Forman of the Nottinghamshire Guardian, which reduced the cost and improved the quality.

However, Thomas Bailey’s opinions were considered too temperate by his readers. The circulation of the paper declined. In 1850 the Nottingham Mercury had an average weekly run of 625, whereas the Nottingham Review had 1,634 and the Nottingham Journal 2,269.

In 1851 the mass of subscribers withdrew in protest at Bailey's views respecting the original error of the Ecclesiastical Titles Bill, and his prophecies of its inevitable failure. In the following year the journal declared bankrupt.
