= Matthew Henry Barker =

English sailor, journalist & writer (1790-1846)

Matthew Henry Barker (1790–1846), was an English sailor, journalist, newspaper editor and writer of sea tales.

== Biography ==
Barker was born in 1790 at Deptford, where his father had attained some distinction as a dissenting minister. At an early age he joined an East Indiaman, and afterwards served in the Royal Navy, where, as he was without influence, he never rose beyond the rank of master's mate. Retiring from the service, he commanded a hired armed schooner, and was employed in carrying despatches to the English squadrons on the southern coasts of France and Spain. On one occasion he fell into the enemy's hands, and was detained for some months as prisoner of war. In 1825, he became editor of a West Indian newspaper, and was afterwards employed, from 1827 to 1838, in a similar capacity as editor of The Nottingham Mercury.

Under the name of 'The Old Sailor,’ he wrote a number of lively and spirited sea-tales, very popular in their day. He was naval editor of the United Service Gazette, and a frequent contributor to the Literary Gazette, Bentley's Miscellany, and the Pictorial Times. For some astronomical discoveries he was presented with a telescope by the Royal Astronomical Society. Working hard to the last, he died on 29 June 1846.

== Works ==
His chief works are:

1. Land and Sea Tales, 2 vols., 1836.
2. Topsail-sheet Blocks, or the Naval Foundling, 3 vols., 1838, of which a new edition was issued in 1881.
3. Life of Nelson, 1836.
4. The Naval Club, or Reminiscences of Service, 3 vols., 1843.
5. The Victory, or the Wardroom Mess, 3 vols., 1844.

Most of his works were illustrated by George Cruikshank, with whom he was on intimate terms, and to whose Omnibus he was the chief contributor.

== Archives ==
Archival papers relating to the family of Matthew Henry Barker are held at Bristol Archives (Ref. 15394) (online catalogue).
