= Sydney Dobell =

English poet and critic

Sydney Thompson Dobell
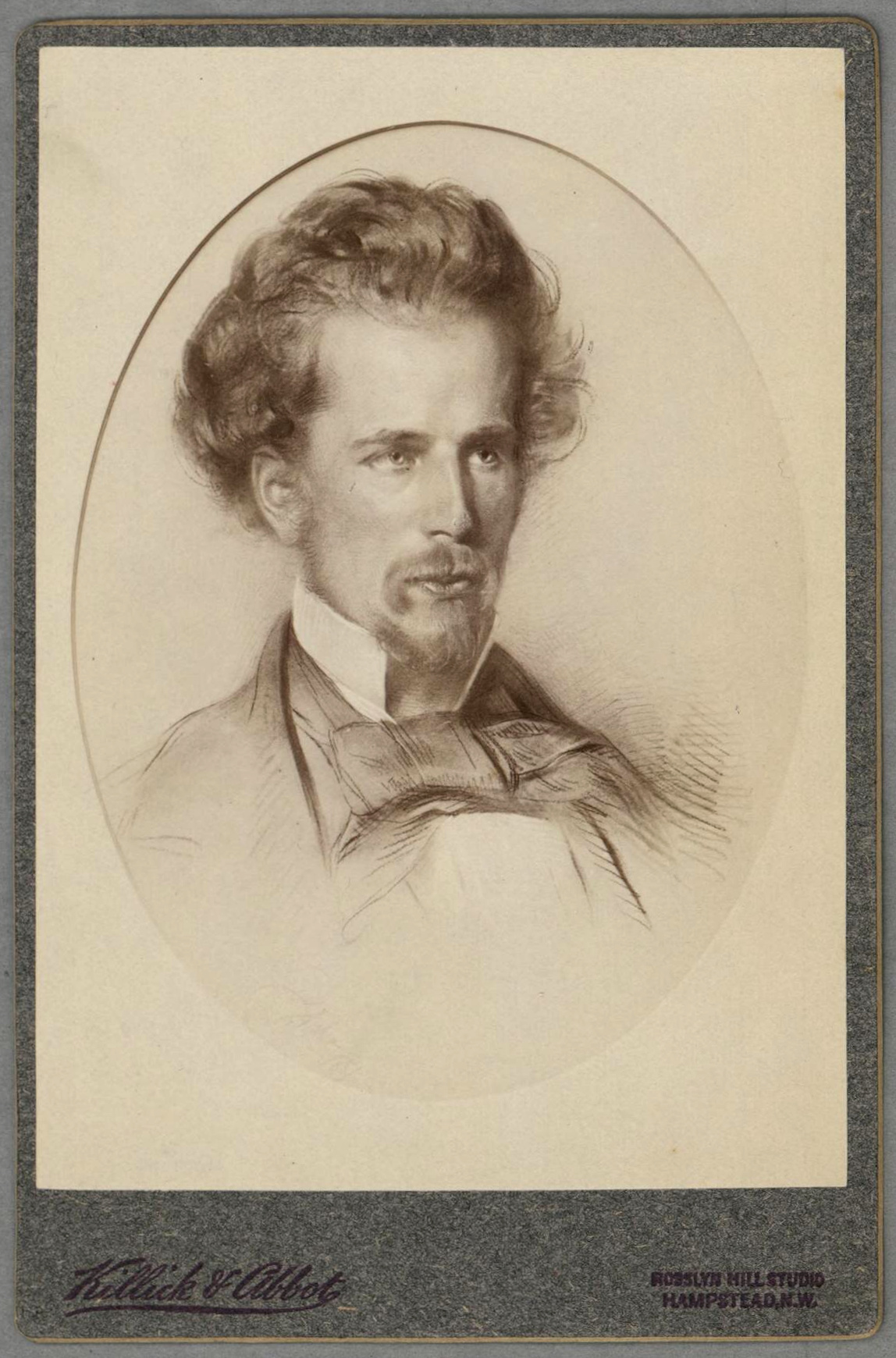
- image of Sydney Thompson Dobell, was a poet
- Born: 5 April 1824; Cranbrook, Kent, England
- Died: 22 August 1874 (aged 50); Nailsworth, Gloucestershire, England
- Occupations: Poet and critic
- Spouse: Emily Fordham
- Writing career
- Notable work: The Roman
- Literary movement: Spasmodic school

Sydney Thompson Dobell (5 April 1824 – 22 August 1874) was an English poet and critic, and a member of the so-called Spasmodic school.

== Biography ==
Dobell was born at Cranbrook, Kent. His father, John Dobell, was a wine merchant and his mother Julietta was a daughter of Samuel Thompson (1766–1837), a London political reformer. He was an older brother of the surgeon Horace Dobell. The family moved to Cheltenham when Dobell was twelve years old. He was educated privately, and never attended either school or university. He refers to this in some lines on Cheltenham College in imitation of Chaucer, written in his eighteenth year. After a five-year engagement he married, in 1844, Emily Fordham, a lady of good family. Acquaintance with James Stansfeld (subsequently Sir James Stansfeld) and with the Birmingham preacher-politician George Dawson fed the young enthusiast's ardour for the liberalism of the day, and later led to the foundation of the Society of the Friends of Italy.

Meanwhile, Dobell wrote a number of minor poems, infused with a passionate desire for political reform. The Roman appeared in 1850, under the pen name of Sydney Yendys. Next year he travelled through Switzerland with his wife; and after his return he formed friendships with Robert Browning, Philip Bailey, George MacDonald, Emanuel Deutsch, Lord Houghton, Ruskin, Holman Hunt, Mazzini, Tennyson and Carlyle. His second long poem, Balder, appeared in 1854. The three following years were spent in Scotland. Dobell also wrote The Ballad of Keith of Ravelston and Tommy's Dead.

Perhaps his closest friend at this time was Alexander Smith. Together they published, in 1855, a number of sonnets on the Crimean War, which were followed by a volume on England in Time of War. Although by no means a rich man he was always ready to help needy men of letters, and it was through his exertions that David Gray's poems were published. In 1869 a horse, which he was riding, fell and rolled over with him. His health, which had for several years necessitated his wintering abroad, was seriously affected by this accident, and he was from this time more or less of an invalid until his death in Nailsworth, Gloucestershire.

== Poetry ==
As a poet Dobell belongs to the Spasmodic school of poetry, as it was named by Professor Aytoun, who parodied its style in Firmilian: A Spasmodic Tragedy. The epithet, however, was first applied by Carlyle to Byron. The school includes George Gilfillan, Philip James Bailey, John Stanyan Bigg, Dobell, Alexander Smith, and, according to some critics, Gerald Massey. It was characterized by an under-current of discontent with the mystery of existence, by vain effort, unrewarded struggle, sceptical unrest, and an uneasy straining after the unattainable. It thus faithfully reflected a certain phase of 19th-century thought.

According to the Encyclopædia Britannica Eleventh Edition:

the productions of the school are marked by an excess of metaphor and a general extravagance of language. On the other hand, they exhibit freshness and originality often lacking in more conventional writings. Dobell's 1850 poem, The Roman, dedicated to the interests of political liberty in Italy, is marked by pathos, energy and passionate love of freedom, but it is overlaid with monologue, which is carried to excess in Balder, relieved though the latter is by fine descriptive passages, and by some touching songs. Dobell's suggestive, but too ornate prose writings were collected and edited with an introductory note by John Nichol (Thoughts on Art, Philosophy and Religion) in 1875 or 1876. The standard edition includes a memoir.

== Religious and political views ==
In his religious views, Dobell was a Christian of the broad church type; and socially he was one of the most amiable and true-hearted of men. Dobell also believed that religion was a personal struggle between a person and the spirituality that existed deep within their own psyche. His early interest in the cause of oppressed nationalities, shown in his friendship with Kossuth, Emanuel Deutsch and others, never lessened, although his views of home politics underwent some change from the radical opinions of his youth. In Gloucestershire, Dobell was well known as an advocate of social reform, and he was a pioneer in the application of the co-operative system of private enterprise.

== Deerhounds ==
Sydney Dobell was also famous as an early breeder of deerhounds. One was given to him by Mr Ronald McDonald of Skye. She was supposed to be descended from the deerhounds of Cher Foreman McDonald. Later generations of his deerhounds were painted by Sydney Dobell's brother-in-law, Briton Rivière, notably in The empty chair, which was first exhibited at the Dudley Gallery, London, in 1869. It was bought for a great deal of money by Howard Dobell, his uncle. It was owned in 1924 by Ralph Dobell, Brooklands, Cheltenham who lent it to an exhibition at Cheltenham Art Gallery & Museum.

== Bibliography ==
Among the published work of Sydney Dobell are:

- Dobell, Sydney (1854). Balder. London: Smith, Elder & Co. OCLC 562606997 (all editions).
- —— (1856). England in Time of War. London: Smith, Elder & Co. OCLC 575945992 (all editions).
- —— (1865). Of parliamentary reform: A letter to a politician. London: Chapman and Hall. OCLC 11201284 (all editions). (2nd. ed. 1866)
