= Alexander Smith (poet) =

Scottish poet and essayist

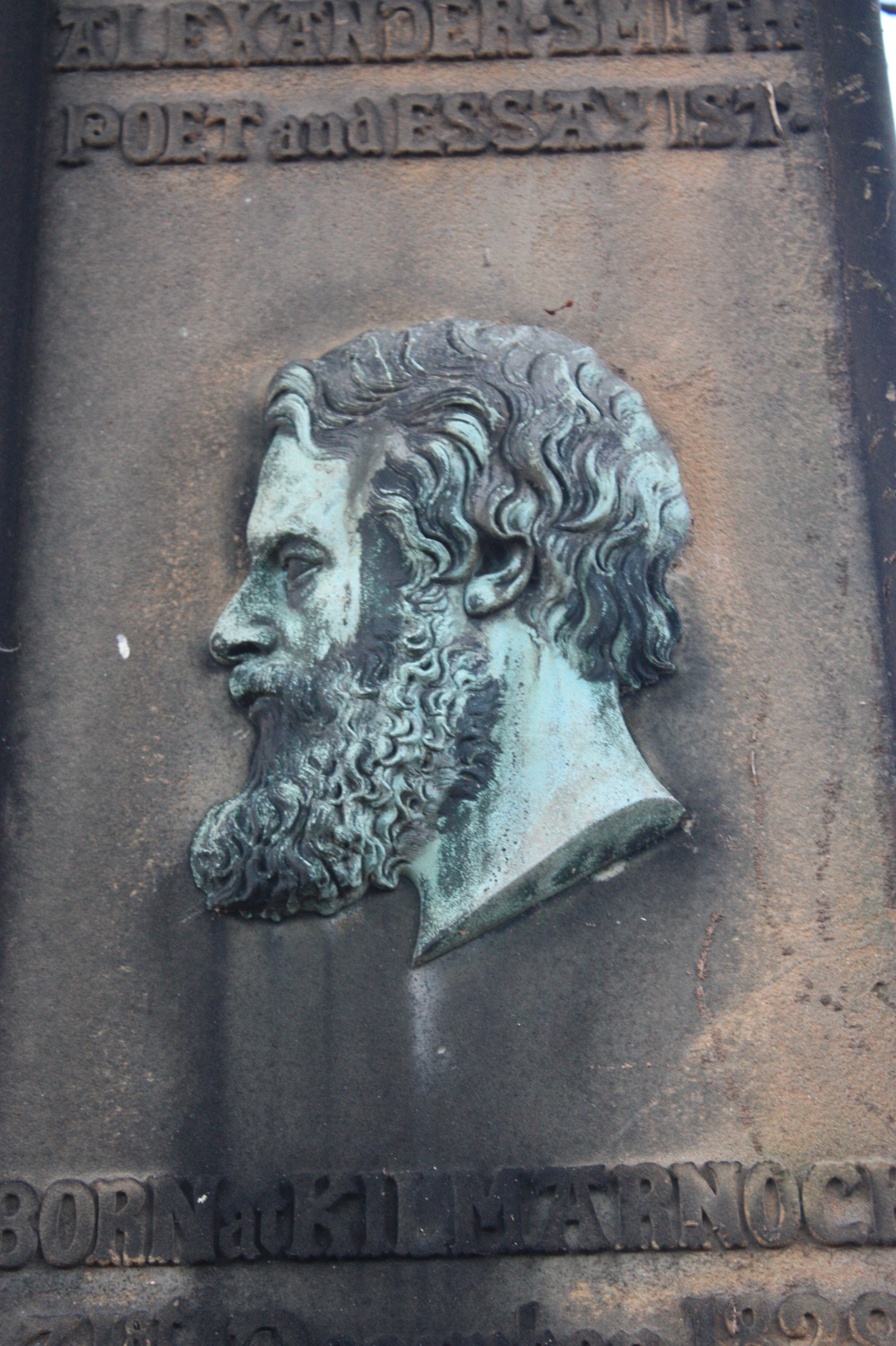
Portrait head of Alexander Smith on his grave, Warriston Cemetery, Edinburgh

Alexander Smith (1829/30, probably 31 December 1829 (Note: The exact date of Smith's birth is uncertain. Statutory registration had not yet been introduced, and no record of the birth or baptism it is indexed in any of the church records held by National Records of Scotland. Smith's ages given in the census, marriage, and death records narrow it down to (possibly) late 1828, 1829, or early 1830. Web searches return 1829 and 1830 roughly equally, with more recent authors favouring 1829. Smith's friends Thomas Brisbane and Patrick Alexander both give it as 31 December 1829; if they are correct about the day of the month, then they are correct about the year. (Brisbane was not a reliable witness. There had been little contact between them for many years when he wrote his book. He got both Smith's parents' names wrong, although they were still alive. Alexander, on the other hand, is likely to be more reliable.)) – 5 January 1867) was a Scottish poet, labelled as one of the Spasmodic School, and essayist.

== Life ==
Alexander Smith was the eldest of eight, possibly nine, children born to John Smith (1803–1884) and Christina née Murray (1804–1881). John Smith was a pattern designer for the textile trade; he worked variously in Paisley and in Kilmarnock, where Alexander was born, before moving to Glasgow when Alexander was about eight years old. (Note: John Smith was born near Dundonald, Ayrshire, and Christina Murray in Paisley. They married in Paisley in January 1829. They lived in Edinburgh from the 1850s until Christina died in 1881; John then went to live with his daughter Christina Williamson in Chicago, where he died on or soon after 21 Jan 1884.)

When Alexander was still at school, he was stricken by a fever that left him with a squint in one eye. (Note: Exactly when this occurred is unclear. Brisbane tells us that it was a fever outbreak in Paisley, that killed his younger sister. Berry agrees that the sister died in Paisley, but says that the squint resulted from a brain fever contracted later, in Glasgow, or possibly from a blow to the head when Alexander was attacked by a bullying gang.) Details of his schooling are sparse, but it is known that it began in Paisley and continued at a school on John Street in Glasgow. There was talk of him being trained for the ministry, but the family's finances required that he leave school at the age of eleven and follow his father's trade in the muslin factory.

Alexander was an avid reader, and became co-founder, with like-minded youngsters, of the Glasgow Addisonian Literary Society. Early poems were published in The Glasgow Citizen, whose proprietor and editor James Hedderwick became a patron and friend. The success of his first volume of poems, A Life Drama and other Poems (1853), brought him fame and influential supporters that led to him being appointed Secretary of Edinburgh University in 1854.

In Edinburgh, Smith was a near neighbour of the landscape painter Horatio McCulloch, who had also grown up in Glasgow, and the two became firm friends. (Note: McCulloch's will names Smith as an executor and Smith's children as legatees) McCulloch's wife, Marcella MacLellan, was from the Isle of Skye, where the Cuillin were the subjects of many of McCulloch's paintings. He and Alexander Nicolson, a Skyeman living in Edinburgh, introduced Smith to the island. That introduction had a profound effect on Smith's remaining years.

On 24 April 1857 Smith married Marcella's cousin, Flora Nicolson Macdonald (1829–1873), at Ord House, her parents' home on Sleat peninsula in Skye. (Note: The births of Flora and her siblings are entered retrospectively in the Sleat Parish Register for 1848/49.) (Note: Flora's great-grandmother Ann Macalister, née Macdonald, was the sister of Allan Macdonald the younger of Kingsburgh, the husband of the famous Flora Macdonald who rescued the fugitive Young Pretender. Ann remarried after Macalister's death, and as Mrs Mackinnon she was hostess to Samuel Johnson and James Boswell at Corriechatachan.) The couple returned to Skye every summer, and the island inspired the work for which Smith is most remembered today: A Summer in Skye.

Smith's later years brought financial worry. His salary from the university had been increased to £200 per annum, but sales of his writing were damaged by hostile criticism. He had to support a growing family, and maintain 'Gesto Villa', a large house in Wardie that had been bought for them by an uncle of Flora who had made his fortune in India from Indigo. Although Alexander's working hours at the university left time to write, that time was largely absorbed in entertaining his many friends and relatives.

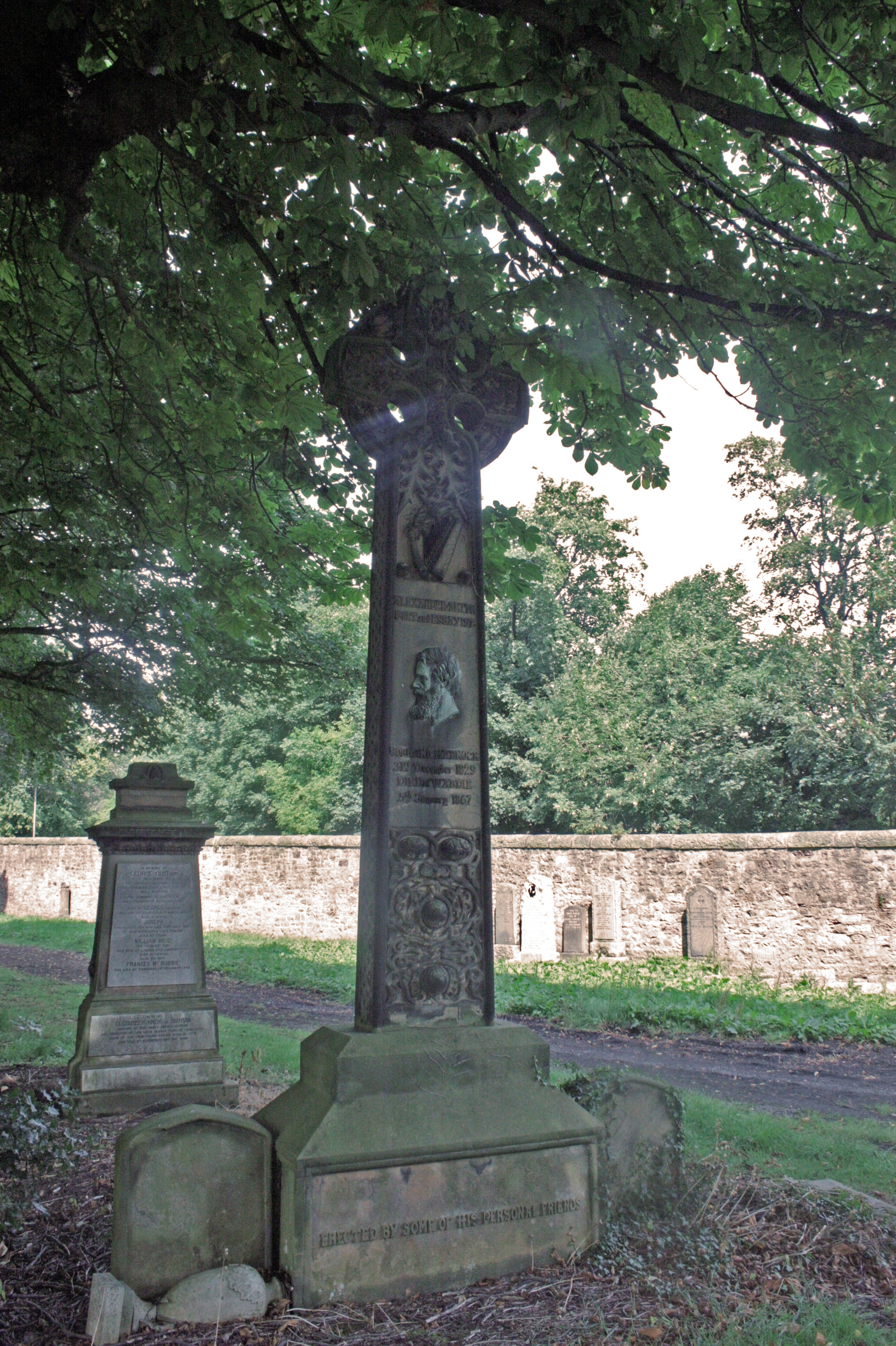
Alexander Smith's grave, Warriston Cemetery

He contracted diphtheria in November 1866. That became compounded with typhoid fever. (Note: Smith's death certificate gives the cause of death as "Diphtheria / Typhoid Fever." Alexander (and Brisbane, perhaps from Alexander) also give the second disease as typhoid fever; Masson (and Berry, perhaps from Masson) give it as typhus.) By the end of the year he seemed to be rallying but the combination was too much. He died at home on 5 January 1867 aged 37, and was buried five days later in Warriston Cemetery.

=== Memorial ===
His 16 feet (4.87m) tall red sandstone cross stands close to the old East Gate (now sealed) of Warriston Cemetery (access is by another gate).

The memorial was designed by the artist James Drummond (1816–1877) in a Celtic cross design including a harp, poet's laurel bay leaf wreath, and a star, and the stonework was carved with thistles and bayleaves intertwining, by the sculptor John Rhind (1828–1892). It also has a bronze head image of Smith in profile, added by William Brodie (1815 – 1881) who also sculpted Greyfriars Bobby.

The inscription is: "Alexander Smith, poet and essayist. Born at Kilmarnock, 31st Dec. 1829; Died at Wardie, 5th Jan. 1867", and at the base it has carved 'Erected by some of his personal friends'.

== Works ==
As a poet he was one of the leading representatives of what was called the "Spasmodic" School, now fallen into oblivion. Smith, P. J. Bailey and Sydney Dobell and other poets from modest backgrounds were satirized by W. E. Aytoun in 1854 in Firmilian: a Spasmodic Tragedy. When Sydney Dobell came to Edinburgh, an acquaintanceship sprang up between the two which resulted in their collaboration in a book of War Sonnets (1855), inspired by the Crimean War. Smith also published City Poems (1857) and Edwin of Deira (1861), a Northumbrian epic poem.

Later Smith was subjected to charges of poetic plagiarism. The influential weekly The Athenaeum published in January 1857 a letter by ‘Z’ (later revealed to be William Allingham) juxtaposing phrases from A Life Drama and City Poems with those used by earlier poets. The campaign was orchestrated by the literary editor Henry Chorley and continued for several months. It was characterised by Prof David Masson as a parrot hunt where ‘borrowed feathers…..flew about green, blue and crimson as at the murder of a parrot’.

Smith turned his attention to prose, and published Dreamthorp: Essays written in the Country (1863), noted especially for the essay A Lark's Flight, in which Smith describes the song of a lark breaking the silence just before the trapdoor is sprung under two condemned men. (Note: This was the execution at Crosshill near Bishopbriggs, on 14 May 1841, when Smith was about eleven years old, of Dennis Doolan and Patrick Redding, navvies on the construction of the Edinburgh and Glasgow Railway, for the murder of a ganger (i.e. supervisor). The execution was noteworthy for being carried out at the place of the crime, a practice that had long been discontinued, and it attracted wide press coverage in England as well as in Scotland.) Two years later he published his most celebrated work, A Summer in Skye (1865). As well as these and many magazine articles, he edited the Golden Treasury edition of Burns, and wrote a novel, Alfred Hagart's Household, which was serialised in Good Words in 1865. (Note: Commentators seem to be divided on whether the sequel, Miss Oona M'Quarrie, which was serialised in Good Words in 1866 and 1867, was an independent novel or a misguided appendage to Alfred Hagart's Household demanded by the magazine.)

Smith's 1857 poem "Glasgow" was adapted into song in 2022 by revival-folk band Bird in the Belly.

== Family ==
Alexander and Flora had five children:

- Flora Macdonald (1858–1867)
- Jessie Catherine (Murray) (1860–1941) went to Australia where she married James Morris (Note: Jessie's additional middle name "Murray" (her paternal grandmother's maiden name) does not appear on her official birth registration or on her baptismal record, but she is "Jessie Murray Smith" in the newspaper announcement of her marriage, and "Jessie Catherine M Morris" in the New South Wales death index. (Incidentally, her baptismal record gives her god-mother as "Mrs McCulloch".))
- Charles Kenneth Macleod (1862–1890) died in Calcutta, India
- Marcella MacLellan (1864–1865) (7 months)
- Isabella Mary Macdonald (1866–1939) went to an uncle at Ord; she married Dr James Pender Smith.

With Alexander's death, Flora's life turned to tragedy. Her mother had died the previous summer. Now, in the space of three months and a few days, she lost her husband, her father, and her eldest child. Only two months after that, McCulloch, who was probably the family's best friend in Edinburgh, died. McCulloch's widow, Flora's cousin, left for Australia, and died on the voyage. Flora, who had come from a beautiful and fairly isolated place, was left in a Victorian metropolis with three small children. She died in 1873, aged forty-four; her death certificate gives the causes of death as cardiac disease, apoplexy, and alcoholism.

== Quotations ==
- "Stirling, like a huge brooch clasps Highlands and Lowlands together".
- "In Scotland one is continually coming into contact with an unreasonable prejudice against English manners, institutions, and forms of thought; and in her expression of these prejudices Scotland is frequently neither great nor dignified. There is a narrowness and touchiness about her which is more frequently found in villages than in great cities. She continually suspects that the Englishman is about to touch her thistle rudely, or to take liberties with her unicorn."
