= Elizabeth Mary Dobell =

English poet

- Born: 8 March 1828; Sandon, Hertfordshire, England
- Died: 1 August 1908 (aged 80); Parkstone, Poole, Dorset, England
- Occupation: Poet
- Spouse: Horace Benge Dobell

Elizabeth Mary Dobell née Fordham (8 March 1828 – 1 August 1908) was a prolific English poet who published several anthologies. She was published under her married name of Mrs Horace Dobell.

== Life ==
Elizabeth Mary Fordham was born in Sandon, Hertfordshire, on 8 March 1828. She was the third daughter of George Fordham, gentleman, of Sandon Bury farm. In 1844 the family was obliged to move to Odsey House, Cambridgeshire. Later that same year Elizabeth's sister Emily married the poet Sydney Thompson Dobell. The wedding introduced Elizabeth to Sydney's younger brother, medical student Horace Benge Dobell. They married in 1849. They had three daughters.

In 1882 Elizabeth and her husband moved to Bournemouth, where they resided at Streate Place in St. Peter's Road until 1889 and Parkstone Heights on Constitution Hill in Parkstone, Poole, from 1892 to 1908, where she died on 1 August 1908. She was buried in Parkstone Cemetery.

Elizabeth objected to a biography being published during her lifetime, but in 1910 a full description of her life accompanied a volume of collected poems, The Poetical Works of Mrs. Horace Dobell; with a Biographical Sketch.

== Poetry ==
Elizabeth Fordham began writing verses before she could correctly spell. They were in all styles of verse and subject matter from lyrics, odes and philosophic musings to lengthy reveries and legendary ballads, but wildness, romance, and contemplation were generally the leading characteristics.

After her marriage and move to London she assisted her husband in his studies to identify a cure for consumption (tuberculosis), often sitting up until the early hours of the morning. Two long poems, Ethelstone and Eveline, were written at that time and printed only for private circulation amongst friends. This decision was taken primarily to avoid disturbing their quiet and studious domestic life, but it was also to prevent causing annoyance to her brother-in-law Sydney, who was then publishing his own poetry. They were finally published nearly 30 years later, after her husband encouraged her to reconsider the poems she had written since childhood.

Married life and the arrival of children meant that she wrote only when the impulse was irresistible, and her only reader was her husband. She also suffered from migraines and other neuralgias. In 1865, after nursing her youngest child through scarlet fever, Elizabeth herself contracted the disease. She subsequently endured a prolonged period of very poor health. Nearly ten years later, the sudden departure of her eldest daughter to South Africa under unfortunate circumstances seemingly had a dire effect on her already shattered nerves, for she suffered a complete loss of memory and physical power. During her long convalescence it was found that examining and arranging pictures of events that had taken place during her amnesia assisted her recovery. She later mounted the many pictures she had received into scrapbooks that she distributed to London and provincial hospitals for the benefit of the patients. Her husband then induced her to take up her pen again and begin recording some reminiscences. These resulted in a small book published anonymously in 1879 under the title Life Behind Her Screens; or, Lifted Veils.

In 1880 she published Versus a Woman; Pro Women; a Man's Thoughts about Men; and Other Articles as a critical response to Young Mrs Jardine by her literary acquaintance Dinah Craik. Elizabeth was incensed by the general indictment that women were "feeble, useless, half-educated; taught to believe that ignorance is amusing and helplessness attractive". This work, which bore on its title page the words "Justice, Justice, Justice", produced a great sensation and was bitterly attacked by the literary friends of Craik, one over-zealous friend offering to pay for the whole edition if Dobell would immediately withdraw it from circulation. Others tried to quash it by representing it as a spiteful, personal attack. However, some independent reviewers considered it a noble defence of women by a woman, one stating that "Mrs. Dobell's vigorous protest will, no doubt, emancipate not a few minds from the thraldom of its prejudiced misconceptions".

Shortly after removing to Bournemouth she published a three-volume prose work, a romance, Dark Pages; or, the Secrets of an Old Bureau.

Her major work was In The Watches Of The Night, which was published in 18 volumes between 1884 and 1888 and contained 1,632 poems. The title alluded to the fact that nearly all the included poems had been written at night while her husband had been conducting his studies. A review of this work by Oscar Wilde, printed anonymously in the Pall Mall Gazette in January 1888, was somewhat disparaging: "The volume that now lies before us is entitled "In the Watches of the Night," most of the poems that it contains having been composed, "in the neighbourhood of the sea, between the hours of ten and two o'clock." Judging from the following extract, we cannot say that we consider this a very favourable time for inspiration, at any rate in the case of Mrs. Dobell."

At her death she left enough unpublished manuscripts to form an additional 26 volumes equal in size to In The Watches Of The Night. She also left many prose writings, comprising notes on scientific, political, religious, and social subjects.

== Works ==
- Eveline, 1852
- Ethelstone, 1854
- Life Behind Her Screens; or, Lifted Veils, 1879
- Versus a Woman; Pro Women; a Man's Thoughts about Men; and Other Articles, 1880
- Ethelstone, Eveline and other poems: Legends of the castle and tales of the village, 1881
- Dark Pages; or, the Secrets of an Old Bureau: In Three Volumes, 1882
- In the Watches of the Night, 1884-1888
- The Poetical Works of Mrs. Horace Dobell; with a biographical sketch, 1910
