= National Association for the Vindication of Scottish Rights =

The National Association for the Vindication of Scottish Rights was established in 1853 by the Edinburgh writer James Grant. It was the first body to publicly articulate dissatisfaction with the Union since the Highland Potato Famine and the nationalist revolts in Mainland Europe during the 1840s, it was closely associated with the Tories and was motivated by a desire to secure more focus on Scottish problems in response to what they felt was undue attention being focused on Ireland by the Liberal government. The short-lived body attracted few notable figures and was wound up in 1856.

The Association claimed that Ireland received more generous treatment than Scotland. It argued that the United Kingdom should always be designated 'Great Britain' and that Scotland ought to send more MPs to Westminster. Those were relatively minor issues and presented no serious challenge to the Establishment. Nevertheless, the Association was an important preliminary step in the campaign for Scottish home rule.

Public supporters of the movement included Lord Eglinton, who moved a petition on behalf of the Association in the House of Lords in April 1854, and Professor William Aytoun of the University of Edinburgh.
