= James Hedderwick =

Scottish poet, journalist and newspaper proprietor

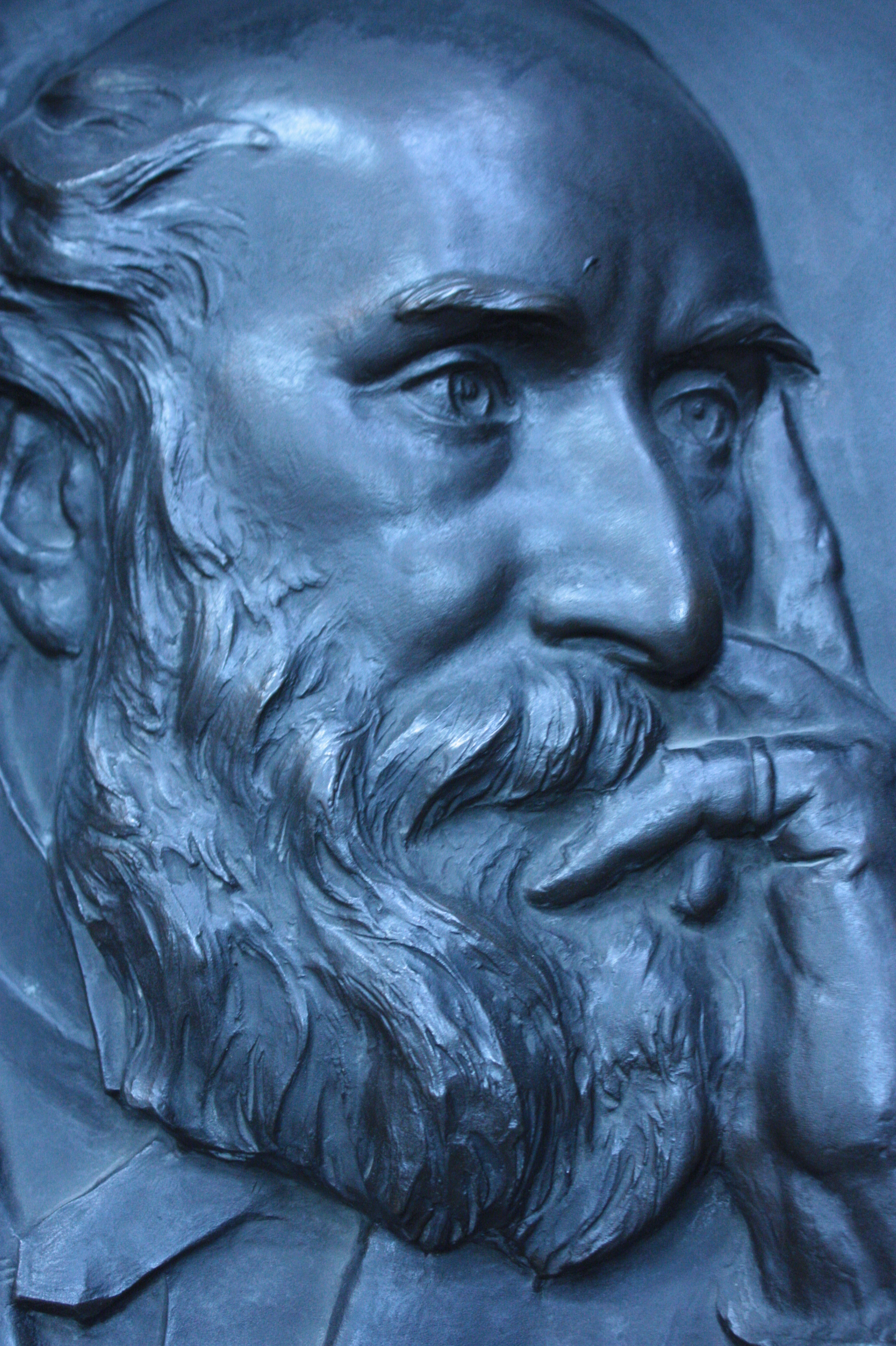
James Hedderwick by James Pittendrigh Macgillivray

James Hedderwick LLD (1814–1897) was a Scottish poet, journalist and newspaper proprietor. He founded the famous Glasgow newspaper, the Evening Citizen.

== Life ==
He was born on 18 January 1814 in Govan just west of Glasgow, the third son of James Hedderwick (d.1864), printer, and Joanna McNeilage.

He was largely raised in Glasgow, other than a brief spell in the United States in 1822 while his father sought work there. On his return to Scotland he began an apprenticeship as a printer in his father’s company, James Hedderwick & Son, which had been founded in 1823 with James' elder brother Robert Hedderwick. From his early teens he contributed articles to newspapers and magazines and decided that writing rather than printing was his vocation.

In 1836 he travelled to London to study English literature at London University. Despite a successful first year, winning first prize in Rhetoric, he gave up his studies and returned to Glasgow in the summer of 1837. Here he began publishing periodicals, starting with the Saltwater Gazette.

In 1837 he also obtained a position in Edinburgh as the Assistant Editor of the Scotsman newspaper under the editorship of Charles Maclaren. He remained in this position until 1842, when he then returned to Glasgow to found the Glasgow Citizen. This included poetry not only by himself, but by other notable Scots poets of the day such as David Gray, Alexander Smith, and William Black. He was a patron and friend of Hugh MacDonald, whose series of Rambles Round Glasgow appeared in the paper. In August 1864 the Citizen adopted an evening newspaper form, the Evening Citizen, which became one of the most successful daily newspapers of its day. It heralded the advent of cheap (half-penny) late-edition journalism in Britain.

Due to the success of the Evening Citizen Hedderwick aided in setting up other evening newspapers in other British cities, notably including the London Echo. Based on the success of the Evening Citizen he also created a weekly literary supplement, the Glasgow Weekly Citizen.

In 1878 Glasgow University awarded him an honorary Doctorate in Law (LLD).

He edited both newspapers until his retirement in 1882, when he moved to Helensburgh west of Glasgow.

He died following a stroke on 1 December 1897 at his home of Rocklands in Helensburgh. He was buried in Sighthill Cemetery in Glasgow.

A large memorial by James Pittendrigh Macgillivray was erected to his memory in 1901, and stands on the inner north wall of Glasgow Cathedral.

== Family ==
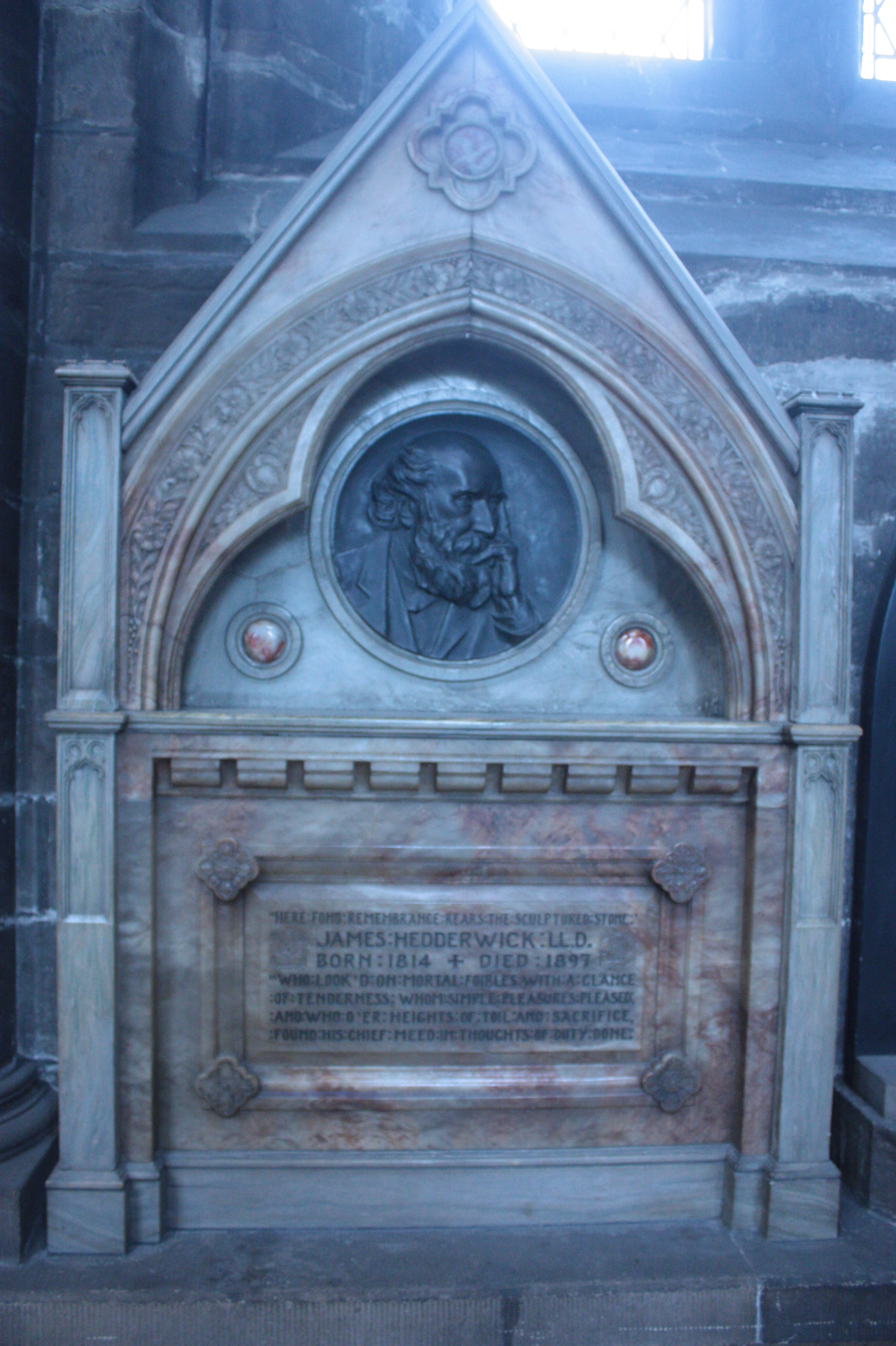
Memorial to James Hedderwick, Glasgow Cathedral

On 11 January 1846 he married Ellen Ness from South Leith, the harbour area of Edinburgh. They had seven children. Thomas Charles Hunter Hedderwick (1850-1918), a lawyer who became MP for Wick Burghs in 1896, was a son of his brother Robert Hedderwick and Anna Mary Walker Hunter.

Ellen died in 1879 and Hedderwick then remarried Margaret (1841-1934) who was considerably younger than himself.

== Publications ==
- The Saltwater Gazette (1837) (co-founded with his elder brother Robert Hedderwick)
- The Glasgow Citizen (1842 onwards) (co-founded with his elder brother Robert Hedderwick)
- Poems by James Hedderwick (1844)
- Lays of Middle Age and Other Poems (1858)
- Hedderwick’s Miscellany of Instructive and Entertaining Literature (1860-1862) (journal)
- Memoir of David Gray (1862)
- The Glasgow Evening Citizen (Aug. 1864 onwards) newspaper
- The Glasgow Evening Citizen (newspaper) (1877 onwards)
- The Villa by the Sea and Other Poems (1881)
- Backward Glances (1891) a memoir of persons encountered within his literary career
