= Evening Citizen =

The Evening Citizen, was an evening version of The Glasgow Citizen (a daily newspaper founded in 1842 by James David Hedderwick). It was first published in August 1864, was one of the first of three evening newspapers to be printed, published and sold in the Glasgow area of Scotland. Both papers were founded by James Hedderwick.

In 1889 the Evening Citizen moved to 24 St Vincent Place, located in the city centre, which was one of the first buildings in Glasgow to be made from red sandstone, and was built that same year to accommodate their printing presses and offices.

At some point the newspaper came into the ownership of George Outram & Co., publishers of the Glasgow Herald and the Evening Times. It is not clear whether Outram published the newspaper or only owned the rights to the masthead but when Lord Beaverbrook came to Glasgow to establish a printing works and publish from 1928 the Scottish Daily Express and the Scottish Sunday Express he also came to an agreement with Outrams to publish the Evening Citizen with Outrams retaining 49% ownership and Beaverbrook Newspapers Ltd having 51% ownership and total control.

When Beaverbrook ceased printing from 159 Albion Street, Glasgow in 1974 they also ceased publication of the Evening Citizen and George Outram & Co became 100% owners of the masthead once more. For a period Outram's Evening Times carried a line indicating "incorporating the Evening Citizen" but this statement was subsequently discontinued.
