= Spasmodic poets =

Victorian-era British poets

The spasmodic poets were a group of British poets of the Victorian era. The term was coined by William Edmonstoune Aytoun with some derogatory as well as humorous intention. The epithet itself is attributed, by Thomas Carlyle, to Lord Byron.

Spasmodic poets include George Gilfillan, the friend and inspiration of William McGonagall. Gilfillan worked for thirty years on his long poem Night, but he is best known for his encouragement of the young Spasmodics in literary reviews which he wrote under the pseudonym "Apollodorus". Others associated with the group were Philip James Bailey, Richard Hengist Horne, Sydney Thompson Dobell, Alexander Smith, John Stanyan Bigg, Gerald Massey, John Westland Marston, and Ebenezer Jones.

The term "spasmodic" was also applied by contemporary reviewers to Elizabeth Barrett Browning's Aurora Leigh, Tennyson's Maud, Longfellow's Golden Legend, and the poetry of Arthur Hugh Clough. These poets are not generally included in the Spasmodic school by modern literary critics. Spasmodic poetry was extremely popular from the late 1840s through the 1850s when it abruptly fell out of fashion. William Edmondstoune Aytoun's parodic Firmilian; or, The Student of Badajoz: a Spasmodic Tragedy (1854) is credited with getting the verse of the Spasmodic school laughed down as bombast.

Spasmodic poetry frequently took the form of verse drama, the protagonist of which was often a poet. It was characterized by a number of features including lengthy introspective soliloquies by the protagonist, which led to the charge that the poetry was egotistical.
