= John Stanyan Bigg =

English poet

John Stanyan Bigg (1828–1865) was an English poet of the Spasmodic School.

His major works are The Sea-King; A metrical romance, in six cantos (1848), Night and the soul. A dramatic poem (1854), Shifting Scenes and Other Poems (1862).

In 1858 Stanyan Bigg submitted an entry to the 'Burns Centenary Poetry Competition', organised by the directors of the Crystal Palace Company in London to mark the centenary of the birth of Robert Burns.
