= Horace Dobell =

English doctor and medical writer

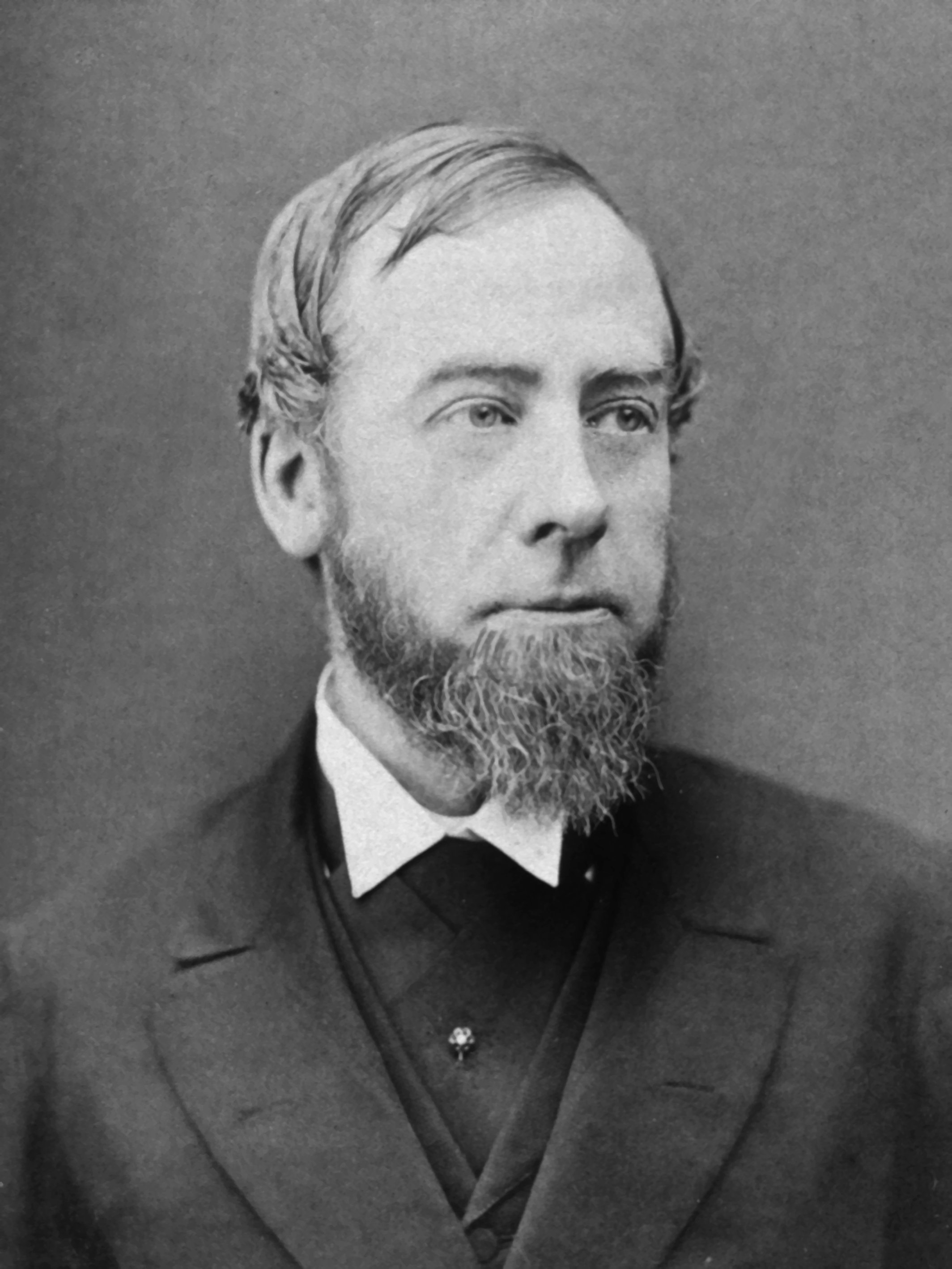
- Dobell in the 19th century
- Born: Horace Benge Dobell; 1 January 1828; London, England
- Died: 22 February 1917 (aged 89); Parkstone, Dorset, England
- Education: St Bartholomew's Hospital (M.R.C.S.); University of St Andrews (M.D.)
- Occupations: Doctor, medical writer

Signature
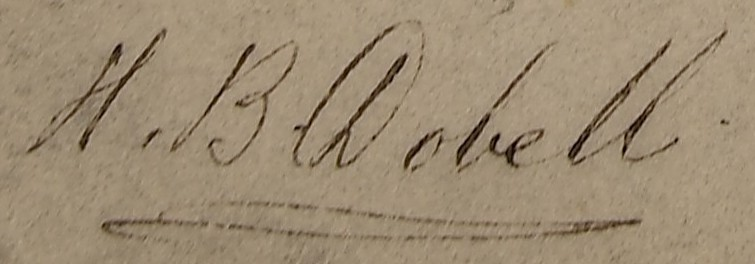

Horace Benge Dobell (1 January 1828 – 22 February 1917) was an English doctor and medical writer, consulting doctor to the Royal Infirmary/Hospital for Diseases of the Chest.

== Life ==
Horace Dobell was born in London on 1 January 1828. His father, John Dobell, was a wine merchant and his mother Julietta was a daughter of Samuel Thompson (1766–1837), a London political reformer. He was a younger brother of the poet Sydney Dobell. In 1849 he married Elizabeth Mary Fordham, daughter of George Fordham of Odsey House, Cambridgeshire. They had three daughters.

Dobell’s choice of medical specialism was apparently made when he was still a student and courting his future wife. While on vacation in Gloucestershire, he and Elizabeth Fordham had ridden out to sketch a village church. When Elizabeth saw a plaque that recorded the death of seven brothers and sisters from consumption (tuberculosis), the disease that killed many of her close relations, she became emotional and expressed her dismay that doctors were powerless to prevent it. Dobell then asked "What if I should devote my life to discovering a cure for this scourge?" Elizabeth replied "I would idolise the man who could so dignify a doctor’s life."

He gained his M.R.C.S. diploma at St. Bartholomew's Hospital in 1849, and gained a M.D. from the University of St Andrews in 1856. From 1859 to 1875 he was Physician at the Royal Infirmary/Hospital for Diseases of the Chest. In 1863 Charles Darwin wrote to Dobell to thank him for a copy of his On the germs and vestiges of disease and they corresponded on matters related to hereditary conditions.

In 1882 Dobell moved to Bournemouth, where in 1885 he became a consulting physician at the newly opened Mont Dore hydropathic sanatorium for patients with chest diseases. One of his patients was the author R L Stevenson.

Dobell died at his home in Parkstone, Dorset on 22 February 1917. He was buried in Parkstone Cemetery alongside his late wife.

== Works ==
- Demonstrations of diseases in the chest and their physical diagnosis, 1858
- Lectures on the germs and vestiges of disease, and on the prevention of the invasion and fatality of disease by periodical examinations, 1861
- A manual of diet and regimen for physician and patient, 1864
- On tuberculosis: its nature, cause, and treatment; with notes on pancreatic juice, 1866
- On diet and regimen in sickness and health: and on the interdependence and prevention of diseases and the diminution of their fatality, 1870
- On winter cough, catarrh, bronchitis, emphysema, asthma : a course of lectures delivered at the Royal Hospital for Diseases of the Chest, 1872
- On affections of the heart and in its neighbourhood. Cases, aphorisms, and commentaries, London: H. K. Lewis, 1872. Second ed., 1876
- On coughs, consumption, and diet in disease, 1877
- On loss of weight, blood spitting, and lung disease, 1878
- The medical aspects of Bournemouth and its surroundings, 1885
