= Philip James Bailey =

British poet (1816–1902)

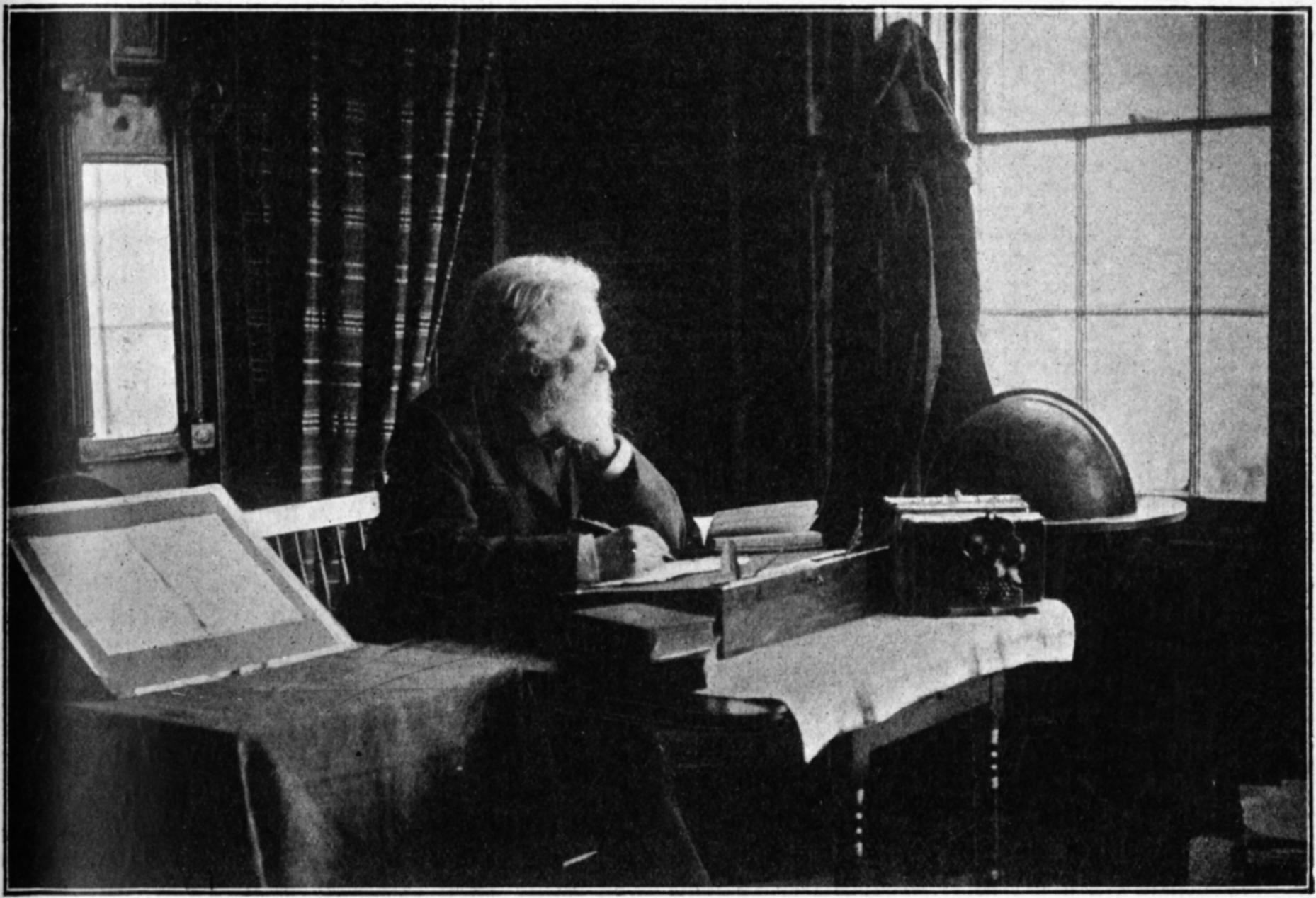
- Philip James Bailey in his study at the Rope Walk, Nottingham
- Born: 22 April 1816; Nottingham, England
- Died: 6 November 1902 (aged 86); Nottingham, England
- Occupation: Poet
- Notable work: Festus
- Spouses: Anne Reed (m. 1840; div. 1862) Anne Sophia Carey (m. 1863; death 1896)
- Children: Philip Festus James; & 1 daughter
- Parents: Thomas Bailey (father); Marie-Anne, née Taylor (mother)

Philip James Bailey (22 April 1816 – 6 September 1902) was an English poet, best known as the author of Festus.

== Life ==
Bailey was born on 22 April 1816, in Nottingham, the only son of Thomas Bailey by his first wife, Mary Taylor. He was brought up on the poetry of Lord Byron. Educated in Nottingham, he was tutored in classics by Benjamin Carpenter, a Unitarian minister. At the age of 15, he matriculated at the University of Glasgow. Dropping the idea of becoming a Presbyterian minister, he began in 1833 to study law in a solicitor's office in London. On 26 April 1834, he entered Lincoln's Inn, and was called to the bar on 7 May 1840, but never practised law.

In 1836, Bailey retired to his father's house at Old Basford, near Nottingham, to write. In 1856, he received a civil list pension in recognition of his literary work. In 1864, he moved to Jersey, and travelled. In 1876, he returned to England, settling first at Lee near Ilfracombe, and in 1885 at Blackheath. Finally he retired to Nottingham. In June 1901, he received the honorary Doctor of Laws (DLL) from the University of Glasgow.

Bailey died of influenza on 6 September 1902. He was buried in Nottingham Rock (aka Church) Cemetery after a service at St Andrew's Church, Nottingham.

== Works ==
Bailey is known almost exclusively by his one voluminous poem, Festus, first published anonymously in 1839, and then expanded with a second edition in 1845. A vast pageant of theology and philosophy, it comprised in some twelve divisions an attempt to represent the relation of God to man, and to postulate "a gospel of faith and reason combined."

Among the admirers of Festus was Tennyson. Henry Wadsworth Longfellow imitated it in The Golden Legend (1851). Bailey himself described his approach with the neologism "omnist". Margaret Fuller was an enthusiast for the work, if with critical reservations.

The subsequent poems of Bailey, The Angel World (1850), The Mystic (1855), The Age (1858), and The Universal Hymn (1867), were failures. The author then incorporated large extracts of these into the later editions of Festus, which ultimately extended to over 40,000 lines when the final edition was published in 1889. At one time his work was immensely popular, admired for its 'fire of imagination' (Elizabeth Barrett Browning), but, like the other works of the Spasmodic school of which Bailey was considered the father, it is now little read.

In 2021, Edinburgh University Press published a critical edition of Festus, edited by Mischa Willett.

== See also ==
- Panarchy
- Spasmodism
