= Old Basford =

Area of Nottingham, England

Coordinates: 52.98°N 1.18°W

- Location within Nottinghamshire
- OS grid reference: SK551428
- Unitary authority: Nottingham
- Ceremonial county: Nottinghamshire
- Region: East Midlands
- Country: England
- Sovereign state: United Kingdom
- Post town: NOTTINGHAM
- Postcode district: NG5/6/7
- Dialling code: 0115
- Police: Nottinghamshire
- Fire: Nottinghamshire
- Ambulance: East Midlands

Old Basford is an area of Nottingham located next to New Basford being split by Valley Road/Western Boulevard. The parish church of St Leodegarius was built in the 12th century. The north aisle and north arcade were rebuilt in 1858–59 and the church restored, except for the tower. The church tower collapsed in 1859 and was rebuilt in 1859–61. Near the church is the Manor House of c. 1700.

== See also ==
- St Leodegarius Church, Basford
