= Nottingham City Council elections =

Local government elections in Nottinghamshire, England

Nottingham City Council elections are held every four years. Nottingham City Council is the local authority for the unitary authority of Nottingham in Nottinghamshire, England. Until 1 April 1998 it was a non-metropolitan district. Since the last boundary changes in 2019, 55 councillors are elected from 20 wards.

== Council elections ==
- 1973 Nottingham City Council election
- 1976 Nottingham City Council election (New ward boundaries)
- 1979 Nottingham City Council election
- 1983 Nottingham City Council election
- 1987 Nottingham City Council election (City boundary changes took place but the number of seats remained the same)
- 1991 Nottingham City Council election
- 1995 Nottingham City Council election
- 1997 Nottingham City Council election
- 1999 Nottingham City Council election
- 2003 Nottingham City Council election (New ward boundaries)
- 2007 Nottingham City Council election
- 2011 Nottingham City Council election
- 2015 Nottingham City Council election
- 2019 Nottingham City Council election (New ward boundaries)
- 2023 Nottingham City Council election

== City result maps ==
2003 results map

2007 results map

2011 results map

2015 results map

2019 results map

2023 results map

== By-election results ==
=== 1987-1991 ===
Byron by-election 3 November 1988
Party	Candidate	Votes	%	±%
Labour	Alan Clark	2,977	54.3	
Conservative	Jessie Paterson	2,377	43.4	
SLD	Ian Hale	89	1.6	
Independent	David Merrick	20	0.4	
Radical Liberal	James Welch	16	0.3	
Majority		600	10.9	
Turnout			51.9	
Labour gain from Conservative		Swing		

This by-election was triggered by the death of Conservative councillor David Flowerday. Following the by-election the council was under no overall control, with both Labour and the Conservatives holding 27 seats, with the balance of power held by the only other councillor, John Peck of the Communist Party.

=== 2003-2007 ===
Sherwood By-Election 20 November 2003
Party	Candidate	Votes	%	±%
Labour		1,459	44.2	+10.0
Conservative		963	29.2	−1.7
Independent		288	8.7	+8.7
Liberal Democrats		278	8.4	−6.7
Green		203	6.1	−6.8
Socialist Alliance		74	2.2	−4.7
Church of the Militant Elvis		36	1.1	+1.1
Majority		496	15.0	
Turnout		3,301		
Labour gain from Conservative		Swing		

Wollaton East and Lenton Abbey By-Election 5 May 2005
Party	Candidate	Votes	%	±%
Liberal Democrats		1,045	35.0	−6.7
Conservative		901	30.2	−8.7
Labour		759	25.4	+6.0
Green		220	7.4	+7.4
UKIP		60	2.0	+2.0
Majority		144	4.8	
Turnout		2,985		
Liberal Democrats hold		Swing		

=== 2007-2011 ===
Wollaton West By-Election 7 August 2008
Party	Candidate	Votes	%	±%
Conservative		2,769	62.2	+15.7
Labour		1,042	23.4	+3.0
Liberal Democrats		424	9.5	−4.5
UKIP		220	4.9	−3.5
Majority		1,727	38.8	
Turnout		4,455		
Conservative hold		Swing		

=== 2011-2015 ===
Bridge By-Election 18 October 2011
Party	Candidate	Votes	%	±%
Labour	Michael Edwards	1,152	50.2	−1.8
Liberal Democrats	Saghir Akhtar	892	38.9	+2.7
Conservative	Michael Ilyas	172	7.5	−4.3
UKIP	Andrew Taylor	50	2.2	+2.2
Church of the Militant Elvis	David Bishop	27	1.2	+1.2
Majority		260	11.3	
Turnout		2,293		
Labour hold		Swing		

Bilborough By-Election 4 April 2013
Party	Candidate	Votes	%	±%
Labour	Wendy Smith	1,542	67.2	+5.9
UKIP	Irenea Marriott	347	15.1	+15.1
Conservative	Ian Culley	176	7.7	−11.9
Green	Katharina Boettge	103	4.5	+4.5
Liberal Democrats	John Calvert	96	4.2	−5.8
Church of the Militant Elvis	David Bishop	31	1.4	+1.4
Majority		1,195	52.1	
Turnout		2,295		
Labour hold		Swing		

Wollaton East and Lenton Abbey By-Election 4 April 2013
Party	Candidate	Votes	%	±%
Labour	Sam Webster	627	52.9	+10.0
Liberal Democrats	Tony Sutton	368	31.0	+1.4
Conservative	Jeanna Parton	116	9.8	−14.3
UKIP	Andrew Taylor	75	6.3	+2.8
Majority		259	21.8	
Turnout		1,186		
Labour hold		Swing		

Wollaton West By-Election 6 June 2013
Party	Candidate	Votes	%	±%
Labour	Steve Battlemuch	2,211	46.8	+11.1
Conservative	James Spencer	1,594	33.8	−16.9
UKIP	Chris Clarke	565	12.0	+12.0
Liberal Democrats	Barbara Pearce	216	4.6	−9.0
Green	Katharina Boettge	106	2.2	+2.2
Church of the Militant Elvis	David Bishop	28	0.6	+0.6
Majority		617	13.1	
Turnout		4,720		
Labour gain from Conservative		Swing		

Dales By-Election 7 November 2013
Party	Candidate	Votes	%	±%
Labour	Neghat Khan	1,644	66.4	+12.3
UKIP	Irenea Marriott	364	14.7	+14.7
Conservative	Neale Mittenshaw-Hodge	220	8.9	−9.0
Green	Adam McGregor	99	4.0	+4.0
Liberal Democrats	Tad Jones	78	3.1	−17.8
TUSC	Cathy Meadows	72	2.9	+2.9
Majority		1,280	51.7	
Turnout		2,477		
Labour hold		Swing		

Radford and Park By-Election 7 November 2013
Party	Candidate	Votes	%	±%
Labour	Anne Peach	1,146	65.2	+17.1
Conservative	Nicholas Packham	355	20.2	−6.1
UKIP	Francesco Lari	123	7.0	+7.0
Green	Katharine Boettge	80	4.6	−9.7
Church of the Militant Elvis	David Bishop	31	1.8	+1.8
TUSC	Geraint Thomas	22	1.3	+1.3
Majority		791	45.0	
Turnout		1,757		
Labour hold		Swing		

Clifton North By-Election 6 March 2014
Party	Candidate	Votes	%	±%
Labour	Patricia Ferguson	1,179	41.2	−9.7
Conservative	Andrew Rule	1,025	35.8	−13.3
UKIP	Kevin Clarke	536	18.7	+18.7
Church of the Militant Elvis	David Bishop	67	2.3	+2.3
Liberal Democrats	Tony Marshall	56	2.0	+2.0
Majority		154	5.4	
Turnout		2,863		
Labour hold		Swing		

=== 2015-2019 ===
Sherwood By-Election 4 May 2017
Party	Candidate	Votes	%	±%
Labour	Adele Williams	2,816	63.5	+19.4
Conservative	William Scott	847	19.1	+0.7
Liberal Democrats	Barry Holliday	359	8.1	+2.0
Green	Zeb Brigham	221	5.0	−12.8
UKIP	Carol Boultby	139	3.1	−5.9
Church of the Militant Elvis	David Bishop	51	1.2	+1.2
Majority		1,969	44.4	
Turnout		4,433		
Labour hold		Swing		

Basford By-Election 19 October 2017
Party	Candidate	Votes	%	±%
Labour	Nick Raine	1,409	68.2	+19.4
Conservative	Bradley Wing	408	19.7	−0.4
UKIP	Bill Ottewell	119	5.8	−10.3
Green	Zeb Brigham	81	3.9	−8.4
Liberal Democrats	Rebecca Proctor	49	2.4	+2.4
Majority		1,001	48.5	
Turnout		2,066		
Labour hold		Swing		

Bestwood By-Election 19 October 2017
Party	Candidate	Votes	%	±%
Labour	Georgia Power	1,280	63.4	+7.8
UKIP	Francesco Lari	301	14.9	−7.0
Conservative	William Scott	297	14.7	−1.2
Liberal Democrats	Christina Morgan-Danvers	57	2.8	+2.8
Green	Liam McClelland	50	2.5	−4.1
Church of the Militant Elvis	David Bishop	34	1.7	+1.7
Majority		979	48.5	
Turnout		2,019		
Labour hold		Swing		

Bulwell Forest By-Election 19 October 2017
Party	Candidate	Votes	%	±%
Labour	Cheryl Barnard	1,420	54.4	+8.1
Conservative	Karen Kemp	966	37.0	+17.2
UKIP	Tony Blay	141	5.4	−14.6
Green	Andrew Jones	52	2.0	−5.6
Liberal Democrats	Callum Southern	31	1.2	−3.0
Majority		454	17.4	
Turnout		2,610		
Labour hold		Swing		

Wollaton West By-Election 8 March 2018
Party	Candidate	Votes	%	±%
Labour	Cate Woodward	2,193	48.8	+10.1
Conservative	Paul Brittain	1,950	43.4	+8.2
Liberal Democrats	Tony Sutton	237	5.3	−1.7
Green	Adam McGregor	72	1.6	−8.2
Church of the Militant Elvis	David Bishop	41	0.9	+0.9
Majority		243	5.4	
Turnout		4,493		
Labour gain from Conservative		Swing		

Clifton North By-Election 27 September 2018
Party	Candidate	Votes	%	±%
Conservative	Roger Steel	1,311	47.7	+12.1
Labour	Shuguftah Quddoos	928	33.8	−4.2
Nottingham Ind.	Kevin Clarke	307	11.2	+11.2
Liberal Democrats	Rebecca Procter	92	3.3	+3.3
Green	Kirsty Jones	64	2.3	+2.3
Church of the Militant Elvis	David Bishop	46	1.7	+1.7
Majority		383	13.9	
Turnout		2,748		
Conservative gain from Labour		Swing		

=== 2019-2023 ===
St Ann's By-Election 7 October 2021
Party	Candidate	Votes	%	±%
Labour	Corall Jenkins	1,048	65.5	+0.9
Nottingham Ind.	Francesco Lari	204	12.7	+12.7
Conservative	Ngoc Thanh Tran	193	12.1	+1.2
Green	Barbara Coulson	92	5.7	+5.7
Liberal Democrats	James Housley	40	2.5	−8.0
TUSC	Florence Trevorah	24	1.5	+1.5
Majority		844	52.7	
Turnout		1,601		
Labour hold		Swing		

Sherwood By-Election 7 October 2021
Party	Candidate	Votes	%	±%
Labour	Nayab Patel	1,174	47.8	−17.1
Nottingham Ind.	Colin Barratt	629	25.6	+25.6
Conservative	Alfred Pryor	320	13.0	−1.0
Green	Catriona Sibert	195	7.9	+7.9
TUSC	Geraint Thomas	76	3.1	+3.1
Liberal Democrats	Alison Rouse	63	2.6	−9.8
Majority		545	22.2	
Turnout		2,457		
Labour hold		Swing		

=== 2023-2027 ===
Leen Valley By-Election 20 August 2026
Party	Candidate	Votes	%	±%
Labour	Abbas Hussain	689	30.5	
Nottingham People's Alliance	Parveen Begum	523	23.2	
Reform	Stuart Frost	410	18.2	
Green	Hugh McGuinness	378	16.7	
Conservative	Gail Stancliffe	189	8.4	
Liberal Democrats	Liz Morgan-Danvers	68	3.0	
Majority		166	7.4	
Turnout		2,257		
Labour hold		Swing		
