= 2011 Nottingham City Council election =

Local election in England

← 2007	5 May 2011	2015 →

All 55 seats to Nottingham City Council 28 seats needed for a majority
	First party	Second party	Third party
Party	Labour	Conservative	Liberal Democrats
Last election	42	7	6
Seats won	50	5	0
Seat change	▲8	▼2	▼6
Popular vote	112,325	46,899	18,052
Percentage	60.4%	25.2%	9.7%
- Nottingham ward map following the 2011 election
Leader before election
Jon Collins
Labour
Subsequent Leader
Jon Collins
Labour

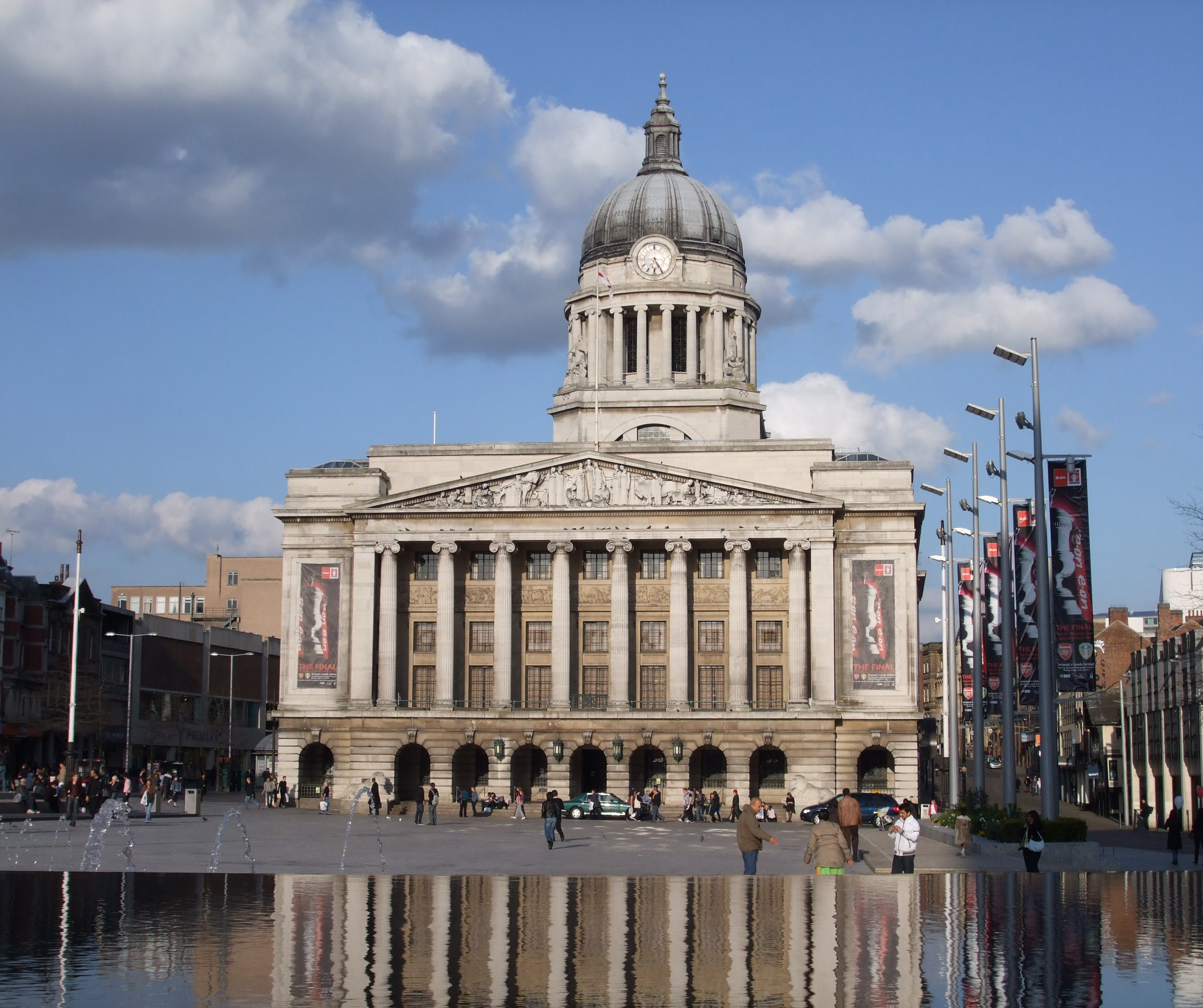
Nottingham Council House

The 2011 elections to Nottingham City Council were held on 5 May 2011 to elect all 55 members to the council.

The previous election was held in 2007 and the results were: Labour 42, Conservatives 7, Liberal Democrats 6. At the time of the 2011 election one Labour councillor, Mick Newton, had left the party and was an independent councillor. This left Labour with 41 councillors at the time of the election.

No ward boundary changes took place between the 2007 and 2011 elections.

The result of the election was notable for completely wiping-out the Liberal Democrats in Nottingham. The Conservative Party lost two seats, whilst Labour strengthened their position.

== Overall results ==
A total of 55 councillors were elected from 20 wards in the city.

The expected declaration time was 4am on 6 May.

Nottingham local election result 2011
Party	Seats	Gains	Losses	Net gain/loss	Seats %	Votes %	Votes	+/−
Labour	50	9	0	+9	90.9	60.4	112,325	
Conservative	5	0	2	-2	9.1	25.2	46,899	
Liberal Democrats	0	0	6	-6	0.0	9.7	18,052	
Green	0	0	0	0	0.0	1.9	3,602	
UKIP	0	0	0	0	0.0	1.6	2,963	
BNP	0	0	0	0	0.0	0.4	760	
Independent	0	0	1	-1	0.0	0.3	567	
Militant Elvis Anti-Tesco Popular Front	0	0	0	0	0.0	0.2	322	
Elvis Turns Green	0	0	0	0	0.0	0.1	240	
TUSC	0	0	0	0	0.0	0.1	212	

== Ward results ==
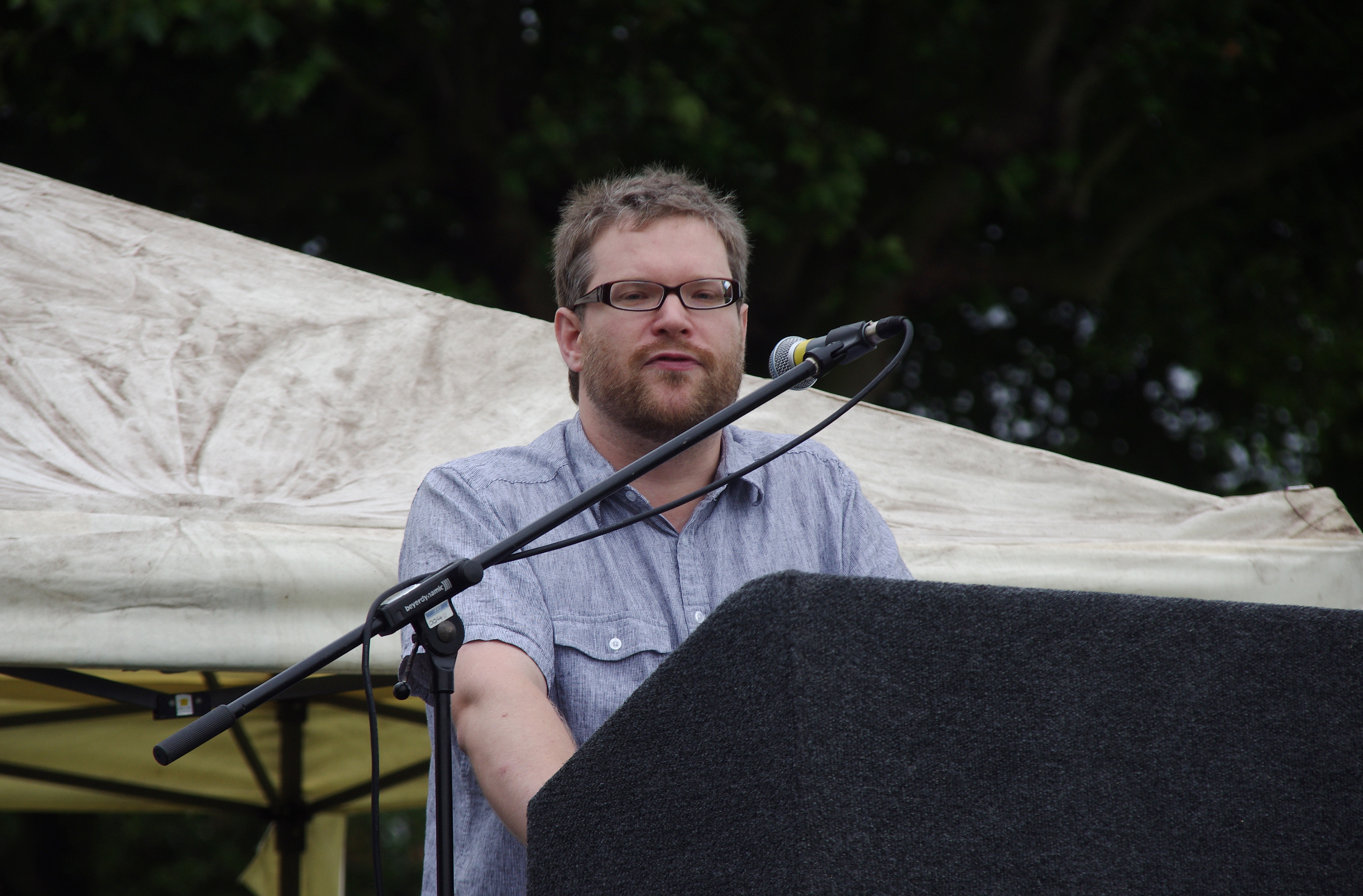
Alex Foster was one of six Liberal Democrats who lost their seats. The party was completely wiped out in Nottingham

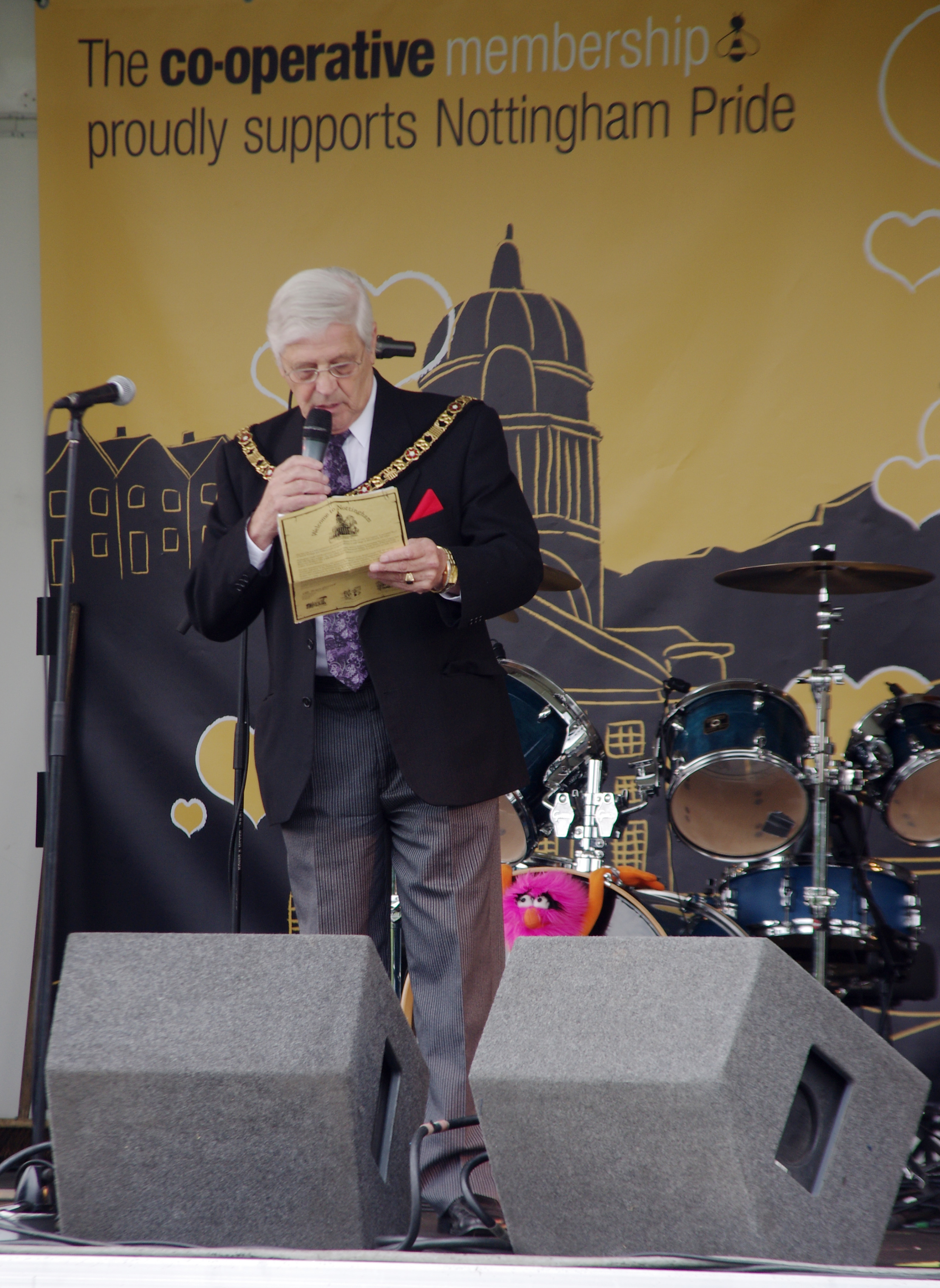
Labour's Brian Grocock retained his seat

=== Arboretum ===
Arboretum ward (2 seats)
Party	Candidate	Votes	%
Labour	Merlita Bryan	1,335	35.4
Labour	Azad Choudhry	1,266	33.6
Liberal Democrats	Tony Marshall	451	12.0
Liberal Democrats	Ali Shan	382	10.1
Conservative	Adam William Poole	167	4.4
Conservative	William Gordon Newing	165	4.4
Labour hold			
Labour gain from Liberal Democrats			
Turnout			27.1

=== Aspley ===
Aspley ward (3 seats)
Party	Candidate	Votes	%
Labour	Graham Ransley Chapman	2,417	28.3
Labour	Carole Williams McCulloch	2,251	26.4
Labour	Leon Unczur	2,206	25.8
Conservative	Michael Holmstock	348	4.1
Conservative	James Henry Marshall	323	3.8
UKIP	Jennie Raymond	309	3.6
Conservative	Marjorie Anne Wroughton	257	3.0
UKIP	David Spooner	220	2.6
UKIP	Deb Spooner	208	2.4
Labour hold			
Labour hold			
Labour hold			
Turnout			30.3

=== Basford ===
Basford ward (3 seats)
Party	Candidate	Votes	%
Labour	Cat Arnold	2,436	22.0
Labour	Bill Ottewell	2,197	19.8
Labour	Alex Norris	2,126	19.2
Conservative	Keith Ian Goodinson	795	7.2
Conservative	Susan Carole Goodinson	765	6.9
Conservative	Dan Sullivan	701	6.3
Independent	Mick Newton	567	5.1
Liberal Democrats	Julia Dawn Bates	547	4.9
Liberal Democrats	Tim Ball	536	4.8
Liberal Democrats	William Henry Davison	407	3.8
Labour hold			
Labour hold			
Labour hold			
Turnout			37.1

=== Berridge ===
Berridge ward (3 seats)
Party	Candidate	Votes	%
Labour	Mohammed Ibrahim	2,749	21.6
Labour	Carole Ann Jones	2,681	21.0
Labour	Toby Charles Neal	2,135	16.8
Liberal Democrats	Raja Nisar Hussain	829	6.5
Green	Alice Hilary Jane McGregor	770	6.0
Liberal Democrats	Candice Samantha Blackwell	744	5.8
Conservative	Mohammed Safdar	733	5.8
Liberal Democrats	Tad Jones	669	5.3
Conservative	John Hutchinson	659	5.2
Conservative	Kate Amy Truax	535	4.2
Elvis Turns Green	Ian Alan Joseph Pickering	240	1.9
Labour hold			
Labour hold			
Labour hold			
Turnout			40.1

=== Bestwood ===
Bestwood ward (3 seats)
Party	Candidate	Votes	%
Labour	Brian Grocock	2,451	26.6
Labour	Mick Wildgust	2,066	22.4
Labour	David Smith	2,062	22.4
Conservative	John Anthony Crofts	748	8.1
Conservative	Felicity Marion Whiting Crofts	724	7.9
Conservative	Wendy Manning	672	7.3
Liberal Democrats	Chris Cook	497	5.4
Labour hold			
Labour hold			
Labour hold			
Turnout			30.7

=== Bilborough ===
Bilborough ward (3 seats)
Party	Candidate	Votes	%
Labour	Derek John Cresswell	2,573	23.4
Labour	Malcolm Arthur Wood	2,407	22.3
Labour	Marcia Watson	2,288	21.2
Conservative	Ian Culley	824	7.6
Conservative	Husham Sharif Chattar	780	7.2
Conservative	Vera Cross	763	7.1
Liberal Democrats	John Christopher Calvert	421	3.9
BNP	Bob Brindley	381	3.5
BNP	Bob Coyne	379	3.5
Labour hold			
Labour hold			
Labour hold			
Turnout			34.7

=== Bridge ===
Bridge ward (2 seats)
Party	Candidate	Votes	%
Labour	Nicola Clare Heaton	1,613	28.0
Labour	Ian MacLennan	1,470	25.5
Liberal Democrats	Saghir Akhtar	1,121	19.5
Liberal Democrats	Scott Ashley Walker	843	14.6
Conservative	Peter Alistair Beynon	365	6.3
Conservative	Jeanna Parton	345	6.0
Labour gain from Liberal Democrats			
Labour hold			
Turnout			35.6

=== Bulwell ===
Bulwell ward (3 seats)
Party	Candidate	Votes	%
Labour	Ginny Klein	2,234	23.6
Labour	John Alan Hartshorne	2,067	21.8
Labour	Jackie Morris	1,968	20.8
Conservative	Stuart Michael Myles-Wilson	666	7.0
Conservative	Barry William Carr	658	7.0
UKIP	Trevor Rose	581	6.1
Conservative	Tiffany Kate Trenner-Lyle	567	6.0
UKIP	Irenea Marriott	390	4.1
UKIP	Lee Waters	344	3.6
Labour hold			
Labour hold			
Labour hold			
Turnout			31.9

=== Bulwell Forest ===
Bulwell Forest ward (3 seats)
Party	Candidate	Votes	%
Labour	Eunice Fay Campbell	2,956	22.1
Labour	Alan Michael Clark	2,938	22.0
Labour	Nick McDonald	2,714	20.3
Conservative	Gerry Davie	1,402	10.5
Conservative	Rachel Elizabeth Gama	1,259	9.4
Conservative	Neale Mittenshaw-Hodge	1,122	8.4
UKIP	Dave Marshall	336	2.5
UKIP	Gemma Louise Wolfe	248	1.9
TUSC	Charlie Taylor	212	1.6
UKIP	Peter Zinn	194	1.5
Labour hold			
Labour hold			
Labour gain from Conservative			
Turnout			46.2

=== Clifton North ===
Clifton North ward (3 seats)
Party	Candidate	Votes	%
Labour	Lee Harold Jeffery	1,902	18.0
Conservative	Roger David Steel	1,834	17.3
Conservative	Timothy John Spencer	1,772	16.7
Conservative	Andrew Mark Price	1,767	16.7
Labour	Sam Webster	1,720	16.3
Labour	Rizwan Araf	1,589	15.0
Labour gain from Conservative			
Conservative hold			
Conservative hold			
Turnout			38.5

=== Clifton South ===
Clifton South ward (3 seats)
Party	Candidate	Votes	%
Labour	Ian William Malcolm	2,274	22.3
Labour	Christopher Gibson	1,980	19.4
Labour	Jeannie Audrey Packer	1,950	19.1
Conservative	Brendan Clarke-Smith	1,274	12.5
Conservative	Carol Ann Woolley	1,235	12.1
Conservative	Andrew James Peter Rule	1,079	10.6
Liberal Democrats	Michael James Aston	267	2.6
Liberal Democrats	Ahmed Insar	154	1.5
Labour hold			
Labour hold			
Labour hold			
Turnout			35.8

=== Dales ===
Dales ward (3 seats)
Party	Candidate	Votes	%
Labour	Gul Nawaz Khan	2,456	23.1
Labour	David Mellen	2,327	21.9
Labour	Kenneth Lawrence Williams	2,238	21.0
Liberal Democrats	Ali Asghar	949	8.9
Conservative	Sajad Hamed	815	7.7
Conservative	Julie Elizabeth Orange	809	7.6
Conservative	Stephanie Stewardson	726	6.8
Militant Elvis Anti-Tesco Popular Front	David Laurence Bishop	322	3.0
Labour hold			
Labour hold			
Labour hold			
Turnout			39.7

=== Dunkirk & Lenton ===
Dunkirk & Lenton ward (2 seats)
Party	Candidate	Votes	%
Labour	Sarah Piper	1,061	34.3
Labour	David Trimble	1,022	33.0
Conservative	Emily Charlotte Burditt	328	10.6
Conservative	Jamie Trott	255	8.2
Liberal Democrats	Alisdair McGregor	241	7.8
Liberal Democrats	Malik Naeem Shahbaz	190	6.1
Labour hold			
Labour hold			
Turnout			30.6

=== Leen Valley ===
Leen Valley ward (2 seats)
Party	Candidate	Votes	%
Labour	Glyn Jenkins	1,706	26.5
Labour	Mohammed Saghir	1,566	24.3
Liberal Democrats	Gary David Long	1,076	16.7
Liberal Democrats	Alex Foster	1,011	15.7
Conservative	David Peter Robert Gibson	612	9.5
Conservative	Michael Ilyas	466	7.2
Labour gain from Liberal Democrats			
Labour gain from Liberal Democrats			
Turnout			47.5

=== Mapperley ===
Mapperley ward (3 seats)
Party	Candidate	Votes	%
Labour	Emma Dewinton	2,358	20.0
Labour	Rosemary Elizabeth Caroline Healy	2,059	17.5
Labour	Thulani Molife	1,836	15.6
Conservative	Bill Dennis	1,413	12.0
Conservative	Jim Fields	1,304	11.1
Conservative	Mohammed Maqsood	1,101	9.4
Green	Anthony Stuart Hamilton	572	4.9
Liberal Democrats	John Francis Hay	451	3.8
Liberal Democrats	Dan Caseley	358	3.0
Liberal Democrats	Dora Kostiuk	313	2.7
Labour hold			
Labour hold			
Turnout			38.4

=== Radford & Park ===
Radford & Park ward (3 seats)
Party	Candidate	Votes	%
Labour	Liaqat Ali	1,717	18.4
Labour	Stephanie Linda Williams	1,710	18.3
Labour	Mohammad Aslam	1,639	17.6
Conservative	Ed Attenborough	940	10.1
Conservative	Katya Lamb	932	10.0
Conservative	Nick Packham	866	9.3
Green	Tom West	509	5.5
Liberal Democrats	Jennifer Anne Coggles	404	4.3
Liberal Democrats	Michael Ian Thomas	336	3.6
Liberal Democrats	Sulayman Salomon Jawara	274	2.9
Labour hold			
Labour hold			
Labour hold			
Turnout			30.1

=== Sherwood ===
Sherwood ward (3 seats)
Party	Candidate	Votes	%
Labour	Brian Parbutt	2,664	18.9
Labour	Jane Urquhart	2,629	18.6
Labour	Alex Ball	2,597	18.4
Conservative	Ewan Lamont	1,239	8.8
Conservative	Nick Max	1,096	7.8
Conservative	Shaun Hartley	1,081	7.7
Green	Lydia Rowan Davies-Bright	729	5.2
Green	Phil Sainty	525	3.7
Green	Birgit Angela Völlm	496	3.5
Liberal Democrats	Ann Venning Bourke	436	3.1
Liberal Democrats	Alison Rouse	334	2.4
Liberal Democrats	Peter Charles Mendenhall	307	2.2
Labour hold			
Labour hold			
Labour hold			
Turnout			45.8

=== St Ann's ===
St Ann's ward (3 seats)
Party	Candidate	Votes	%
Labour	Jon Collins	2,074	26.9
Labour	Sue Johnson	2,044	26.5
Labour	David Liversidge	1,969	25.5
Conservative	John Christopher Berlin Garrett	465	6.0
Conservative	Lucy Elizabeth Smith	447	5.8
Conservative	Olivia Charlotte Willett	400	5.2
Liberal Democrats	Alexander James Matthews	322	4.2
Labour hold			
Labour hold			
Labour hold			
Turnout			26.4

=== Wollaton East & Lenton Abbey ===
Wollaton East & Lenton Abbey ward (2 seats)
Party	Candidate	Votes	%
Labour	Sally Ann Longford	981	22.1
Labour	Stuart Fox	942	21.2
Liberal Democrats	Dave Oldham	676	15.2
Liberal Democrats	Tony Bernard Sutton	631	14.2
Conservative	James Michael Spencer	551	12.4
Conservative	Jane Upton	530	11.9
UKIP	Chris Sneap	79	1.8
UKIP	Andrew William Taylor	54	1.2
Labour gain from Liberal Democrats			
Labour gain from Liberal Democrats			
Turnout			29.3

=== Wollaton West ===
Wollaton West ward (3 seats)
Party	Candidate	Votes	%
Conservative	Georgina Jane Culley	2,870	18.3
Conservative	Eileen Margaret Mary Morley	2,646	16.9
Conservative	Stephen Neil Parton	2,593	16.5
Labour	Adam George Spencer	2,018	12.9
Labour	Linda Mary Woodings	1,938	12.4
Labour	Shafiq Ahmed	1,753	11.2
Liberal Democrats	Barbara Ann Pearce	770	4.9
Liberal Democrats	John Henry Burr	601	3.8
Liberal Democrats	Bill Smith	506	3.2
Conservative hold			
Conservative hold			
Conservative hold			
Turnout			51.7

== By-Elections between May 2011 - May 2015 ==
By-elections are called when a representative Councillor resigns or dies, so are unpredictable. A by-election is held to fill a political office that has become vacant between the scheduled elections.

=== Bridge Ward by-election, (20 October 2011) ===
Due to the death of Cllr Ian McLennan (Labour), a by-election was called in the city's Bridge ward in October 2011. It took place on 20 October. The results were as follows:

Bridge Ward by-election (1 seat)
Party	Candidate	Votes	%	±%
Labour	Michael Edwards (E)	1,152	50.2	−3.0
Liberal Democrats	Saghir Akhtar	892	38.9	+4.8
Conservative	Mohammed (known as Michael) Ilyas	172	7.5	−4.8
UKIP	Andrew Taylor	50	2.2	+2.2
Bus-Pass Elvis	David Bishop	27	1.2	+1.2
Labour hold		Swing		
Turnout		2,293	24.15	

=== Bilborough Ward by-election, (4 April 2013) ===
Bilborough Ward by-election (1 seat)
Party	Candidate	Votes	%	±%
Labour	Wendy Barbara Smith (E)	1542	67.2	+5.9
UKIP	Irenea Marriott	347	15.1	+15.1
Conservative	Ian Culley	176	7.7	−11.9
Green	Katharina Boettge	103	4.5	+4.5
Liberal Democrats	John Christopher Calvert	96	4.2	+5.8
Bus-Pass Elvis	David Laurence Bishop	31	1.4	+1.4
Labour hold		Swing		
Turnout				

=== Wollaton East and Lenton Abbey Ward by-election, (4 April 2013) ===
Wollaton East and Lenton Abbey Ward by-election (1 seat)
Party	Candidate	Votes	%	±%
Labour	Sam Webster (E)	627	52.9	+10.0
Liberal Democrats	Tony Bernard Sutton	368	31.0	+1.4
Conservative	Jeanna Parton	116	9.8	−14.3
UKIP	Andrew Taylor	75	6.3	+2.8
Labour hold		Swing		
Turnout				

=== Wollaton West Ward by-election, (6 June 2013) ===
Wollaton West Ward by-election (1 seat)
Party	Candidate	Votes	%	±%
Labour	Steve Battlemuch (E)	2211	46.9	+11.2
Conservative	James Michael Spencer	1594	33.8	−16.9
UKIP	Chris Clarke	565	12.0	+12.0
Liberal Democrats	Barbara Ann Pearce	216	4.6	−9.0
Green	Katharina Boettge	103	2.2	+2.2
Bus-Pass Elvis	David Bishop	28	0.6	+0.6
Labour gain from Conservative		Swing		
Turnout		4717	-16.6	−941

=== Dales Ward by-election, (7 November 2013) ===
Dales Ward by-election (1 seat)
Party	Candidate	Votes	%	±%
Labour	Neghat Nawaz Khan (E)	1644	66.4	+12.3
UKIP	Irenea Marriott	364	14.7	+14.7
Conservative	Neale Mittenshaw-Hodge	220	8.9	−9.0
Green	Adam Fergus McGregor	99	4.0	+4.0
Liberal Democrats	Tad Jones	78	3.1	−17.8
TUSC	Cathy Meadows	72	2.9	+2.9
Labour hold		Swing		
Turnout		2491	22.21	

=== Radford and Park Ward by-election, (7 November 2013) ===
Radford and Park Ward by-election (1 seat)
Party	Candidate	Votes	%	±%
Labour	Anne Sara Peach (E)	1146	65.2	+17.1
Conservative	Nicholas John Packham	355	20.2	−6.1
UKIP	Francesco Lari	123	7.0	+7.0
Green	Katharina Boettge	80	4.6	−9.7
Bus-Pass Elvis	David Laurence Bishop	31	1.8	+1.8
TUSC	Geraint Thomas	22	1.3	+1.3
Labour hold		Swing		
Turnout		1768	13.8	

=== Clifton North Ward by-election, (6 March 2014) ===
Clifton North Ward by-election (1 seat)
Party	Candidate	Votes	%	±%
Labour	Patricia Ferguson (E)	1179	41.2	−9.7
Conservative	Andrew James Peter Rule	1025	35.8	−13.3
UKIP	Kevin Clarke	536	18.7	+18.7
Bus-Pass Elvis	David Laurence Bishop	67	2.3	+2.3
Liberal Democrats	Tony Marshall	56	2.0	+2.0
Labour hold		Swing		
Turnout				

== See also ==
- 2011 United Kingdom local elections
- 2011 United Kingdom Alternative Vote referendum
