= 2015 Nottingham City Council election =

Local election in England

← 2011	7 May 2015	2019 →

All 55 seats to Nottingham City Council 28 seats needed for a majority
	First party	Second party
Leader	Jon Collins	Georgina Culley
Party	Labour	Conservative
Last election	50	5
Seats before	49	3
Seats won	52	3
Seat change	+2	-2
- Nottingham ward map following the 2015 election

The 2015 elections to Nottingham City Council were held on 7 May 2015 to elect all 55 members to the Council across 20 wards.

== Overall election results ==
2015 Nottingham City Council election
Party	Candidates						Votes		
Party	Stood	Elected	Gained	Unseated	Net	% of total	%	No.	Net %
Labour	55	52	2	0	+2	94.5	51.1	152,810	
Conservative	55	3	0	2	-2	5.5	22.4	66,407	
UKIP	46	0	0	0	0	0.0	13.8	37,135	
Green	28	0	0	0	0	0.0	8.0	23,899	
Liberal Democrats	23	0	0	0	0	0.0	3.1	9,862	
TUSC	9	0	0	0	0	0.0	0.5	1,577	
Independent	8	0	0	0	0	0.0	1.0	2,881	
Bus-Pass Elvis	1	0	0	0	0	0.0	0.0	123	

== Nottingham City Council - Results by Ward ==
=== Arboretum ===
Arboretum (2)
Party	Candidate	Votes	%
Labour	Merlita Bryan	2,228	32.3
Labour	Azad Choudhry	1,836	26.6
Green	Chris Pryke-Hendy	986	14.3
Conservative	Felicity Marion Whiting Crofts	571	8.3
Conservative	Daniel Alan Dowson	515	7.5
Liberal Democrats	Tony Marshall	320	4.6
UKIP	Christopher Browne	263	3.8
UKIP	Simon Rood	176	2.6
Turnout		6895	49.5
Labour hold			
Labour hold			

=== Aspley ===
Aspley (3)
Party	Candidate	Votes	%
Labour	Graham Ransley Chapman	3,390	24.9
Labour	Carole Williams McCulloch	2,968	21.8
Labour	Patience Uloma Ifediora	2,750	20.2
UKIP	Shaun Hobson	981	7.2
UKIP	Nicholas Joseph Forster	872	6.4
UKIP	Jeff Middleton	770	5.7
Conservative	Rebecca Catherine Armstrong	524	3.9
Conservative	Peter Anthony Linford	444	3.3
Conservative	Graham Neil Smith	380	2.8
Green	Adam James Clarke	358	2.6
Liberal Democrats	Martin Nigel Gladwell	171	1.3
Turnout		13608	46.0
Labour hold			
Labour hold			
Labour hold			

=== Basford ===
Basford (3)
Party	Candidate	Votes	%
Labour	Cat Arnold	3,523	20.2
Labour	Alex Norris	3,306	19.0
Labour	Linda Mary Woodings	2,754	15.8
Conservative	Stuart Michael Myles-Wilson	1,449	8.3
UKIP	Anthony John Waterfall	1,162	6.8
UKIP	Karen Standland	1,143	6.6
UKIP	Edward Pagoda	1,059	6.1
Conservative	Mohammed Safdar Ali	1,006	5.8
Conservative	Mohammed Maqsood	925	5.3
Green	Andrew Guy Jones	885	5.1
TUSC	Caroline Anne Rose Kiely	200	1.2
Turnout		17412	55.9
Labour hold			
Labour hold			
Labour hold			

=== Berridge ===
Berridge (3)
Party	Candidate	Votes	%
Labour	Carole Ann Jones	3,688	19.5
Labour	Mohammed Ibrahim	3,595	19.0
Labour	Toby Charles Neal	3,159	16.7
Green	Atif Hussain	1,424	7.5
Green	Ellie Mitchell	1,289	6.8
Green	Tom West	1,172	6.2
Conservative	John Hutchinson	1,138	6.0
Conservative	Anthony Neale Gerald Mittenshaw-Hodge	889	4.7
Conservative	Dan Sullivan	853	4.5
UKIP	Dawn Rood	651	3.4
Liberal Democrats	Alex Foster	495	2.6
Liberal Democrats	Tad Jones	379	2.0
TUSC	Chris Jackson	229	1.2
Turnout		18961	57.1
Labour hold			
Labour hold			
Labour hold			

=== Bestwood ===
Bestwood (3)
Party	Candidate	Votes	%
Labour	Brian Grocock	3,409	21.4
Labour	Mick Wildgust	2,804	17.6
Labour	Dave Smith	2,799	17.5
UKIP	Michael John Ashton	1,341	8.4
UKIP	Francesco Lari	1,147	7.2
UKIP	Carrie Boultby	1,109	7.0
Conservative	Penelope Anne Messenger	971	6.1
Conservative	Margaret Helena Trueman	897	5.6
Conservative	Marjorie Anne Wroughton	730	4.6
Green	Chloe Victoria Cheeseman	405	2.5
Green	Paul Brian Dale	342	2.1
Turnout		15954	49.1
Labour hold			
Labour hold			
Labour hold			

=== Bilborough ===
Bilborough (3)
Party	Candidate	Votes	%
Labour	Wendy Barbara Smith	3,559	20.6
Labour	Malcolm Arthur Wood	3,122	18.0
Labour	Marcia Watson	3,010	17.4
UKIP	Adam James Gray	1,413	8.2
UKIP	David Graham Hall	1,369	7.9
UKIP	Alan Collins	1,338	7.7
Conservative	Roger David Alton	1,141	6.6
Conservative	Denise Appleby	1,067	6.2
Conservative	Ian Culley	852	4.9
Liberal Democrats	John Christopher Calvert	452	2.6
Turnout		17323	53.8
Labour hold			
Labour hold			
Labour hold			

=== Bridge ===
Bridge (2)
Party	Candidate	Votes	%
Labour	Nicola Clare Heaton	2,944	30.5
Labour	Michael Mountford Edwards	2,427	25.2
Conservative	Peter Alistair Beynon	849	8.8
Green	Liam Elliott McClelland	849	8.8
Conservative	Paul Vincent Ruane	759	7.9
UKIP	Gerald Nolan	475	4.9
Liberal Democrats	Alison Rouse	381	4.0
Independent	Jonathan Duncan Stuart Hughes	369	3.8
UKIP	Andrew William Taylor	359	3.7
Liberal Democrats	Bill Smith	235	2.4
Turnout		9647	55.2
Labour hold			
Labour hold			

=== Bulwell ===
Bulwell (3)
Party	Candidate	Votes	%
Labour	Ginny Klein	2,952	19.2
Labour	John Alan Hartshorne	2,802	18.2
Labour	Jacqueline Iris Morris	2,572	16.7
UKIP	Keith Jeffrey Bonser	1,343	8.7
UKIP	Heike Brast	1,183	7.7
UKIP	David Marshall	1,171	7.6
Conservative	Alexander John Fitzgerald	991	6.4
Conservative	Adam Patrick Kearns	874	5.7
Conservative	Dominic Oliver Jonathan Shetcliffe	753	4.9
Independent	Trevor Alan Rose	361	2.4
TUSC	Becci Heagney	262	1.7
Independent	Irenea Marriott	152	1.0
Turnout		15389	48.8
Labour hold			
Labour hold			
Labour hold			

=== Bulwell Forest ===
Bulwell Forest (3)
Party	Candidate	Votes	%
Labour	Eunice Fay Campbell	3,198	17.8
Labour	Alan Michael Clark	2,997	16.7
Labour	Nick McDonald	2,820	15.7
UKIP	Tony Blay	1,382	7.7
UKIP	Jeff Kilbourne	1,376	7.7
Conservative	Shaun Hartley	1,367	7.6
Conservative	Melvyn Alfred Shepherd	1,354	7.5
Conservative	Carol Ann Walker	1,319	7.3
UKIP	Tracey Cahill	1,197	6.7
Green	Darren Buckland	523	2.9
Liberal Democrats	Andrew John Howarth	292	1.6
TUSC	Geraint Thomas	143	0.8
Turnout		17968	61.4
Labour hold			
Labour hold			
Labour hold			

=== Clifton North ===
Clifton North (3)
Party	Candidate	Votes	%
Labour	Joshua Johnathan Callum Cook	2,397	14.5
Labour	Patricia Ferguson	2,291	13.8
Conservative	Andrew James Peter Rule	2,249	13.6
Labour	Bill Ottewell	1,989	11.8
Conservative	James Michael Spencer	1,790	10.8
Conservative	Roger David Steel	1,772	10.7
UKIP	Kevin Clarke	1,389	8.4
UKIP	Joe Napier	1,247	7.5
UKIP	David John Marshall	1,200	7.2
Independent	Tim Spencer	278	1.7
Turnout		16,572	62
Labour hold			
Labour gain from Conservative			
Conservative hold			

=== Clifton South ===
Clifton South (3)
Party	Candidate	Votes	%
Labour	Christopher Gibson	2,223	13.7
Labour	Corall Joy Jenkins	2,107	13.0
Labour	Steve Young	1,981	12.2
UKIP	Susannah Grocock	1,611	9.9
UKIP	Ellen Dudgeon	1,579	9.8
Conservative	Daniel John Atherton	1,473	9.1
UKIP	John Leslie Barlow	1,433	8.8
Conservative	Andrew Brian Day	1,323	8.2
Conservative	William Raymond Scott	1,195	7.4
Green	Lee Allen Watson	425	2.6
Green	Lindsey Marie Watson	420	2.6
Independent	John Peter Holmes	228	1.4
Independent	Jeannine Audrey Packer	130	0.8
Independent	Norman George Packer	75	0.5
Turnout		16203	55.0
Labour hold			
Labour hold			
Labour hold			

=== Dales ===
Dales (3)
Party	Candidate	Votes	%
Labour	David Mellen	3,280	19.2
Labour	Gul Nawaz Khan	3,035	17.8
Labour	Neghat Nawaz Khan	2,887	16.9
Conservative	Linda Margaret Benson	1,179	6.9
UKIP	Jim Blott	1,094	6.4
Conservative	Alistair Richard Stuart Benson	1,070	6.3
Conservative	Vera Cross	860	5.0
UKIP	Alan John Margerison	847	5.0
Green	Vanessa Susan Osborne	825	4.8
Green	Hazel Maria Honeyman-Smith	812	4.8
Green	David William Waters	641	3.8
Liberal Democrats	Richard James Minkley	333	2.0
TUSC	Cathy Meadows	214	1.3
Turnout		17077	55.2
Labour hold			
Labour hold			
Labour hold			

=== Dunkirk & Lenton ===
Dunkirk & Lenton (2)
Party	Candidate	Votes	%
Labour	Sarah Piper	2,021	28.8
Labour	Dave Trimble	1,475	21.0
Green	Sophie Alice Taylor	1,118	15.9
Conservative	Elliott Alston Raymond Johnson	855	12.2
Conservative	Amelia Faith Rose	783	11.1
UKIP	Daniel Robert Poole	193	2.8
UKIP	Damian Stephen Daniel Smith	184	2.6
Bus-Pass Elvis	David Laurence Bishop	123	1.8
TUSC	Vlad Tomes	96	1.4
Turnout		7028	65.4
Labour hold			
Labour hold			

=== Leen Valley ===
Leen Valley (2)
Party	Candidate	Votes	%
Labour	Glyn Jenkins	2,305	27.2
Labour	Mohammed Saghir	1,913	22.6
Conservative	David Peter Robert Gibson	1,020	12.0
Conservative	Janet Scott	1,003	11.8
Liberal Democrats	Saghir Akhtar	653	7.7
UKIP	Giles Farrand	631	7.5
Liberal Democrats	Michael Ian Thomas	621	7.3
Green	Jon Williams	327	3.9
Turnout		8473	60.8
Labour hold			
Labour hold			

=== Mapperley ===
Mapperley (3)
Party	Candidate	Votes	%
Labour	Rosemary Elizabeth Caroline Healy	2,941	16.6
Labour	Leslie Ayoola	2,796	15.8
Labour	Chris Tansley	2,422	13.7
Conservative	Bill Dennis	1,730	9.8
Conservative	Jim Fields	1,505	8.5
Green	Samantha Mary Tema	1,289	7.3
Independent	Emma Dewinton	1,288	7.3
Conservative	Alexander Ewan Lamont	1,281	7.2
UKIP	Sally Cook	834	4.7
Liberal Democrats	Peter Charles Mendenhall	589	3.3
UKIP	Lee Waters	564	3.2
UKIP	Rhea Waters	481	2.7
Turnout		17720	58.8
Labour hold			
Labour hold			
Labour hold			

=== Radford & Park ===
Radford & Park (3)
Party	Candidate	Votes	%
Labour	Anne Sara Peach	3,132	16.3
Labour	Liaqat Ali	2,950	15.3
Labour	Ilyas Aziz	2,833	14.7
Conservative	Nick Max	1,756	9.1
Conservative	Monica Angela Monni	1,680	8.7
Conservative	Nicholas John Packham	1,578	8.2
Green	Kirsty Lemara Jones	1,154	6.0
Green	Dylan George Richards	1,006	5.2
Green	Edward Mark Sellman	812	4.2
Liberal Democrats	Stephen Paul Freeland	512	2.7
Liberal Democrats	Matthew Thomas Templar Edwards	488	2.5
Liberal Democrats	Matthew Paul Riley	442	2.3
UKIP	Kevin Quarton	324	1.7
UKIP	Grant Williams	313	1.6
UKIP	John Radmall	282	1.5
Turnout		19,262	56.4
Labour hold			
Labour hold			
Labour hold			

=== Sherwood ===
Sherwood (3)
Party	Candidate	Votes	%
Labour	Alex Ball	3,418	17.1
Labour	Jane Louise Urquhart	3,038	15.2
Labour	Brian Parbutt	2,617	13.1
Conservative	Brigitte Amber Dorothy Armstrong	1,429	7.2
Green	Lydia Rowan Davies-Bright	1,378	6.9
Green	Antonia Sara Winifred Zenkevitch	1,358	6.8
Conservative	Jackie Jenkin-Jones	1,160	5.8
Green	Sue Sipple	1,153	5.8
Conservative	Andrew Phillips	1,130	5.7
UKIP	Peter Gordon Foulkes	697	3.5
UKIP	Paul Robert Marshall	635	3.2
UKIP	Wes Stala	503	2.5
Liberal Democrats	Ann Venning Bourke	474	2.4
TUSC	Richard Francis Buckwell	353	1.8
Liberal Democrats	Celia Jane Lee	347	1.7
Liberal Democrats	John Henry Burr	305	1.5
Turnout		19995	63.9
Labour hold			
Labour hold			
Labour hold			

=== St Ann's ===
St Ann's (3)
Party	Candidate	Votes	%
Labour	Jon Collins	3,574	25.1
Labour	Sue Johnson	3,503	24.6
Labour	Dave Liversidge	3,144	22.0
Green	Roger Bromley	1,063	7.5
Conservative	Andrew James Cook	848	5.9
UKIP	Paul Tordoff	729	5.1
Conservative	Luke Fintan Dorian	728	5.1
Conservative	David Alan Jackson	681	4.8
Turnout		14270	48.6
Labour hold			
Labour hold			
Labour hold			

=== Wollaton East & Lenton Abbey ===
Wollaton East & Lenton Abbey (2)
Party	Candidate	Votes	%
Labour	Sally Ann Longford	1,686	26.7
Labour	Sam Webster	1,254	19.8
Conservative	Samuel William Armstrong	754	11.9
Conservative	John Richard Mackay Edward	728	11.5
Green	Duncan Julian Davis	471	7.5
Green	Adam Fergus McGregor	441	7.0
Liberal Democrats	Barry Ian Holliday	355	5.6
Liberal Democrats	Callum William Southern	278	4.4
UKIP	Steven James De La Salle	277	4.4
TUSC	John Ashley Allen	80	1.3
Turnout		6324	65.3
Labour hold			
Labour hold			

=== Wollaton West ===
Wollaton West (3)
Party	Candidate	Votes	%
Labour	Steve Battlemuch	3,855	17.0%
Conservative	Jim Armstrong	3,513	15.5%
Conservative	Georgina Jane Culley	3,501	15.4%
Conservative	Jeanna Parton	3,215	14.1%
Labour	Nick Raine	2,516	11.1%
Labour	Shuguftah Jabeen Quddoos	2,492	11.0%
Green	Annabelle Louise Abdulaty	973	4.3%
UKIP	Chris Cobb	928	4.1%
Liberal Democrats	Christine Mary Dornan	701	3.1%
Liberal Democrats	Barbara Ann Pearce	526	2.3%
Liberal Democrats	Tony Bernard Sutton	513	2.3%
Turnout		22,733	74.4
Labour gain from Conservative			
Conservative hold			
Conservative hold			
