= Trent House, Nottingham =

Building in Nottingham, formerly occupied by Boots and now by Capital One

Trent House
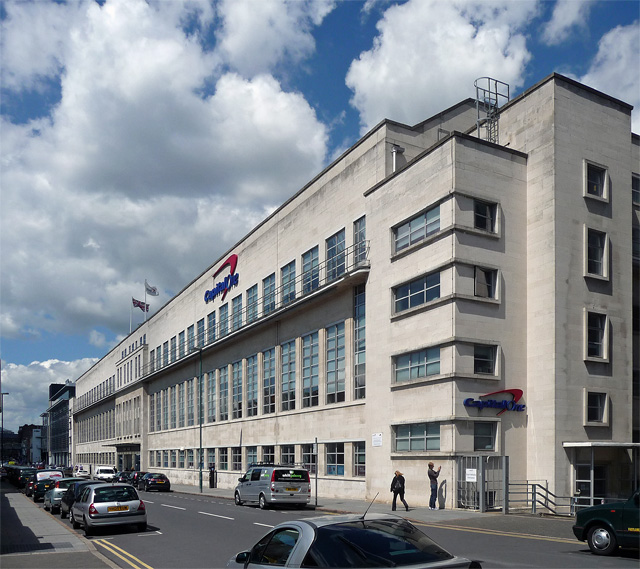
- The building in 2012

General information
- Location: Station Street, NG2 3NG, Nottingham, England
- Coordinates: 52.9479°N 1.142719°W
- Current tenants: Capital One
- Completed: 1961
- Renovated: 1998-2000
- Client: Boots
- Landlord: Nottingham City Council

Technical details
- Size: 306,000 square feet (28,400 m^{2})

Trent House is the European headquarters of the finance company Capital One. It is on Station Street to the south of the centre of the English city of Nottingham, opposite Nottingham railway station and adjacent to Loxley House, the administrative headquarters of Nottingham City Council.

The building dates from 1951, when it was built as a print works for the pharmaceutical company Boots, whose various premises occupied most of the surrounding area at that time. By 1998 the building was in a derelict condition when it was acquired by Capital One, who undertook a major internal transformation of the building between 1998 and 2000 for their use.

== Construction ==
Construction started around May 1959, to be finished in 1961. It cost £800,000. It was a H-shaped building. There was underground parking for 32 vehicles. It was 80 ft high, with 156,000 sq ft. There were four lifts.

== Ownership ==
Shortly after they moved in, Capital One acquired the adjoining plot and had Loxley House built on it to provide extra space. Loxley House was occupied in 2002, but in 2009 Capital One moved out and sold it to Nottingham City Council, retaining Trent House. In 2021, Capital One revealed plans to remodel Trent House, to include a roof terrace for employees and visitors to use, and to introduce fresh internal conference space.

Trent House provides 306,000 square feet (28,400 m^{2}) of office space.
