= Loxley House, Nottingham =

Administrative home of Nottingham City Council

Loxley House
- A view of the building
- Interactive map of the Loxley House area

General information
- Status: Used as council headquarters
- Location: Station Street, NG2 3NG, Nottingham, England
- Coordinates: 52.9481°N 1.1447°W
- Current tenants: Nottingham City Council; Nottingham City Homes; Department for Work and Pensions; Fair Work Agency
- Completed: 2001
- Opened: 2002
- Client: Capital One
- Landlord: Nottingham City Council

Loxley House is the administrative office of Nottingham City Council and an office base for the Department for Work and Pensions and Nottingham City Homes in the south of Nottingham city centre, Notts, England. The building is also used by the Fair Work Agency. It is situated on Station Street, opposite Nottingham railway station and adjacent to Trent House, the former Boots print works that is now the European headquarters of the financial company Capital One.

The building was designed by the architecture firm ORMS and constructed to provide additional space for Capital One, who had previously moved into Trent House. Capital One moved into the building in 2002, but it was acquired by the city council in 2009 at a cost of £22.5 million, which was about a third of its valuation in 2001. The council moved into the building in 2010, relocating from a number of buildings scattered around Nottingham city centre.
