= 2023 Nottingham City Council election =

- 4 May 2023

All 55 seats to Nottingham City Council 28 seats needed for a majority

	First party	Second party	Third party
Leader	David Mellen	Kevin Clarke	Andrew Rule
Party	Labour	Nottingham Ind.	Independent
Last election	50	3	0
Seats before	50 (Note: Including one vacant seat previously held by Labour.)	3	2
Seats after	51	3	1
Seat change	▲1	Steady	▼1
- Winner of each seat at the 2023 Nottingham City Council election
Leader before election
David Mellen
Labour
Leader after election
David Mellen
Labour

The 2023 Nottingham City Council election took place on 4 May 2023, to elect all 55 members of Nottingham City Council in England. It took place as part of the 2023 United Kingdom local elections.

The previous election occurred in 2019, and resulted in the Labour Party retaining control with a majority of seats. Both of the city council's previous two Conservatives left the party just ahead of the election to stand as independent candidates.

Labour retained its majority at the election. The Conservatives failed to win any seats on the council for the first time, although one of the former Conservatives who had left the party in March 2023, Andrew Rule, was re-elected as an independent councillor.

== Councillors standing down ==
20 councillors stood down at this election, including former Cllr Hassan Ahmed who was expelled from the Labour Party for alleged antisemitism. Plus, there was a vacancy immediately prior to the election in St Ann's ward caused by the death of Labour councillor Sue Johnson in March 2023. Cllr Johnson had already decided not to stand for reelection before her death.

Councillor	Ward	Party
Toby Neal	Berridge	Labour
Phil Jackson	Bilborough	Labour
Rebecca Langton	Bilborough	Labour
Wendy Smith	Bilborough	Labour
Jane Lakey	Bulwell	Labour
Eunice Campbell-Clark	Bulwell Forest	Labour
Angharad Roberts	Castle	Labour
Sam Webster	Castle	Labour
Azad Choudhry	Hyson Green and Arboretum	Labour
Merlita Bryan	Hyson Green and Arboretum	Labour
Jawaid Khalil	Hyson Green and Arboretum	Labour
Sally Longford	Lenton and Wollaton East	Labour
David Trimble	Lenton and Wollaton East	Labour
Mohammed Saghir	Leen Valley	Labour
Rosemary Healy	Mapperley	Labour
Nicola Heaton	Meadows	Labour
Hassan Ahmed	Radford	Independent
Anne Peach	Radford	Labour
Cate Woodward	Wollaton West	Labour
Sue Johnson	St. Ann's	Labour
Dave Liversidge	St. Ann's	Labour

== Defeated councillors ==
Councillor	Ward	Party
Roger Steel	Clifton West	Independent

== Ward results ==
On 5 April, the candidates for election were named. On 5 May, the results were announced.

=== Aspley ===
Aspley (3 seats)
Party	Candidate	Votes	%	±%
Labour	Graham Chapman*	1,796	74.8	+0.7
Labour	Carole McCulloch*	1,736	72.3	+2.5
Labour	Patience Ifediora*	1,664	69.3	+2.8
Conservative	Ian Culley	357	14.9	+4.4
Conservative	Neill Slane	356	14.8	+5.7
Conservative	Marjorie Wroughton	314	13.1	+4.9
Liberal Democrats	Stewart Rotherham	184	7.7	–1.5
Turnout		2,402	20.3	–4.7
Registered electors		11,812		
Labour hold				
Labour hold				
Labour hold				

=== Basford ===
Basford (3 seats)
Party	Candidate	Votes	%	±%
Labour	Linda Woodings*	1,644	54.9	±0.0
Labour	Salma Mumtaz*	1,621	54.2	+3.3
Labour	Nick Raine*	1,612	53.9	–2.8
Conservative	Robert Boden	648	21.7	+2.6
Green	Andrew Jones	608	20.3	+2.9
Nottingham Ind.	Wayne Unczur	584	19.5	–3.1
Nottingham Ind.	Cassius Yarde	496	16.6	N/A
Liberal Democrats	Richard Minkley	307	10.3	+1.1
Turnout		2,992	26.3	+0.3
Registered electors		11,360		
Labour hold				
Labour hold				
Labour hold				

=== Berridge ===
Berridge (3 seats)
Party	Candidate	Votes	%	±%
Labour	Angela Kandola*	2,343	72.1	+5.8
Labour	Shuguftah Quddoos*	2,123	65.3	+3.6
Labour	Sulcan Mahmood	2,007	61.8	–0.1
Green	Ellie Mitchell	1,064	32.7	+7.8
Conservative	Peter Parsons	474	14.6	+1.7
Turnout		3,250	30.5	–2.5
Registered electors		10,674		
Labour hold				
Labour hold				
Labour hold				

=== Bestwood ===
Bestwood (3 seats)
Party	Candidate	Votes	%	±%
Labour	Georgia Power*	1,523	57.6	+13.8
Labour	Jay Hayes*	1,453	55.0	+2.0
Labour	Audra Wynter*	1,383	52.3	+9.3
Nottingham Ind.	Francesco Lari	710	26.9	–12.5
Nottingham Ind.	Peter Foulkes-Mills	557	21.1	N/A
Nottingham Ind.	Fran Loi	508	19.2	N/A
Conservative	Ted Grainger	366	13.8	+3.1
Conservative	Craig Jones	332	12.6	+2.2
Conservative	Rimshah Hussain	277	10.5	+3.5
UKIP	Andrew Taylor	126	4.8	–17.5
Liberal Democrats	Diane Rotherham	111	4.2	–3.4
UKIP	Irenea Marriott	84	3.2	–18.5
Turnout		2,644	22.2	–2.8
Registered electors		11,911		
Labour hold				
Labour hold				
Labour hold				

=== Bilborough ===
Bilborough (3 seats)
Party	Candidate	Votes	%	±%
Labour	Sam Harris	1,872	65.4	+1.1
Labour	Helen Kalsi	1,731	60.5	–0.7
Labour	Faith Gakanje-Ajala	1,589	55.5	–1.3
Conservative	Alfred Pryor	806	28.2	+10.7
Liberal Democrats	Liz Morgan-Danvers	678	23.7	+11.0
Turnout		2,862	23.1	–3.9
Registered electors		12,376		
Labour hold				
Labour hold				
Labour hold				

=== Bulwell ===
Bulwell (3 seats)
Party	Candidate	Votes	%	±%
Labour	Ethan Radford*	1,633	66.8	+16.3
Labour	Maria Joannou*	1,368	56.0	+3.0
Labour	Michael Savage	1,228	50.2	–11.3
Nottingham Ind.	Tony Horan	768	31.4	+0.5
Conservative	Aleksandra Kovacevic	424	17.3	–0.2
Conservative	Mohammad Jabarkhyl	384	15.7	+0.9
Liberal Democrats	Matt Genn	362	14.8	+3.5
Turnout		2,444	21.3	–2.7
Registered electors		11,475		
Labour hold				
Labour hold				
Labour hold				

=== Bulwell Forest ===
Bulwell Forest (3 seats)
Party	Candidate	Votes	%	±%
Labour	Cheryl Barnard*	1,573	54.3	–1.2
Labour	Samuel Gardiner*	1,477	50.9	–1.3
Labour	Sarita-Marie Rehman-Wall	1,338	46.2	–12.6
Conservative	Caroline Kampila	849	29.3	+6.1
Conservative	Ebun Adejuyigbe	840	29.0	+9.5
Conservative	Paul Ruane	815	28.1	+10.8
Green	Darren Buckland	378	13.0	N/A
Nottingham Ind.	Samuel Awolola	359	12.4	–11.7
Nottingham Ind.	Pollyanna Sutherland	306	10.6	N/A
TUSC	Charlie Taylor	187	6.5	N/A
Turnout		2,899	28.2	–2.8
Registered electors		10,267		
Labour hold				
Labour hold				
Labour hold				

=== Castle ===
Castle (2 seats)
Party	Candidate	Votes	%	±%
Labour	Sam Lux	897	45.1	+3.0
Labour	Matt Shannon	796	40.1	–0.5
Liberal Democrats	Lloydie James Lloyd	734	36.9	+6.7
Liberal Democrats	Rebecca Procter	665	33.5	+10.0
Green	Katie Kelsey	278	14.0	–5.5
Conservative	Janet Scott	218	11.0	–7.1
Green	Carol Morrell	170	8.6	N/A
Turnout		1,987	34.2	+5.2
Registered electors		5,810		
Labour hold				
Labour hold				

=== Clifton East ===
Clifton East (3 seats)
Party	Candidate	Votes	%	±%
Nottingham Ind.	Maria Watson*	1,331	45.1	+0.9
Nottingham Ind.	Kevin Clarke*	1,309	44.3	+3.8
Nottingham Ind.	Kirsty Jones*	1,271	43.0	+1.0
Labour	Phil Spear	1,236	41.9	+2.2
Labour	Raja Hussain	1,005	34.0	–0.8
Labour	Asif Maqsood	973	32.9	+0.3
Conservative	William Scott	422	14.3	+1.1
Conservative	Daniel Sullivan	386	13.1	+1.5
Liberal Democrats	Benedict Stevens	159	5.4	–0.8
Turnout		2,953	23.8	–2.2
Registered electors		12,387		
Nottingham Ind. hold				
Nottingham Ind. hold				
Nottingham Ind. hold				

=== Clifton West ===
Clifton West (2 seats)
Party	Candidate	Votes	%	±%
Labour	Hayley Spain	1,042	36.2	+2.0
Independent	Andrew Rule*	994	34.6	N/A
Labour	Seb Wilkins	909	31.6	+0.9
Independent	Roger Steel*	849	29.5	N/A
Conservative	Daniel Atherton	710	24.7	–32.5
Conservative	Aamir Nawaz	483	16.8	–39.0
Nottingham Ind.	Paul Bradshaw	212	7.4	N/A
Nottingham Ind.	Emma Crane	212	7.4	N/A
Liberal Democrats	Mark Vandersluis	106	3.7	–5.8
Turnout		2,875	38.4	–0.6
Registered electors		7,491		
Labour gain from Conservative				
Independent gain from Conservative				

=== Dales ===
Dales (3 seats)
Party	Candidate	Votes	%	±%
Labour	David Mellen*	2,287	68.9	–0.1
Labour	Neghat Nawaz Khan*	2,125	64.0	+3.6
Labour	Gul Nawaz Khan*	2,075	62.5	+2.2
Green	Lucy Marsh	530	16.0	–2.4
Conservative	Neil Harbinson	523	15.8	+0.6
Conservative	Penelope Messenger	481	14.5	–0.2
Conservative	Margaret Trueman	463	14.0	+0.4
Liberal Democrats	Ann Bourke	303	9.1	+0.6
Nottingham Ind.	Wendy Wong	268	8.1	N/A
Nottingham Ind.	Mohammed Jamil	234	7.1	N/A
Turnout		3,318	29.0	–3.0
Registered electors		11,428		
Labour hold				
Labour hold				
Labour hold				

=== Hyson Green and Arboretum ===
Hyson Green and Arboretum (3 seats)
Party	Candidate	Votes	%	±%
Labour	Sana Nasir	1,692	69.6	–9.8
Labour	Liaqat Ali	1,676	69.0	–6.7
Labour	Naim Salim	1,497	61.6	–11.0
Green	Julie Hanson	439	18.1	N/A
Liberal Democrats	Alexander Foster	301	12.4	N/A
Conservative	Collin Stott	300	12.3	+1.7
Green	Richard Sutton	300	12.3	N/A
Nottingham Ind.	Mansoor Qazi	200	8.2	N/A
Nottingham Ind.	Paul Singh	181	7.4	N/A
Turnout		2,430	24.2	+0.2
Registered electors		10,023		
Labour hold				
Labour hold				
Labour hold				

=== Leen Valley ===
Leen Valley (2 seats)
Party	Candidate	Votes	%	±%
Labour	Audrey Dinnall*	1,416	64.4	+0.8
Labour	Nadia Farhat	1,338	60.9	+3.3
Conservative	David Gibson	476	21.7	–0.7
Conservative	Gail Stancliffe	372	16.9	–3.3
Liberal Democrats	Gary Long	309	14.1	+0.8
Liberal Democrats	Christina Morgan-Danvers	224	10.2	–2.9
Turnout		2,198	32.1	–1.9
Registered electors		6,843		
Labour hold				
Labour hold				

=== Lenton and Wollaton East ===
Lenton and Wollaton East (3 seats)
Party	Candidate	Votes	%	±%
Labour	Samina Riaz	1,399	59.7	–7.9
Labour	Pavlos Kotsonis*	1,384	59.0	+0.4
Labour	Imran Jalil	1,336	57.0	–3.7
Green	Oliver Fairey	663	28.3	+12.5
Conservative	Titus Hopkins	447	19.1	+4.6
Conservative	Daniel Dieppe	445	19.0	+4.7
Liberal Democrats	Tony Sutton	431	18.4	+9.2
Turnout		2,345	26.5	+5.5
Registered electors		8,865		
Labour hold				
Labour hold				
Labour hold				

=== Mapperley ===
Mapperley (3 seats)
Party	Candidate	Votes	%	±%
Labour	Leslie Ayoola*	1,909	53.3	+1.9
Labour	Kirsty Jones	1,907	53.2	+3.0
Labour	Sajid Mohammed*	1,646	45.9	+3.9
Green	Barbara Coulson	898	25.1	–2.3
Green	Adam McGregor	679	19.0	–3.5
Green	Catherine Sutherland	668	18.6	–0.4
Conservative	Graham Kilbourne	656	18.3	–0.8
Conservative	Melvyn Shepherd	639	17.8	–0.7
Conservative	Zarmeena Quraishi	518	14.5	–4.1
Liberal Democrats	Peter Mendenhall	340	9.5	N/A
Independent	Nigel King	210	5.9	N/A
Turnout		3,583	31.6	–0.4
Registered electors		11,335		
Labour hold				
Labour hold				
Labour hold				

=== Meadows ===
Meadows (2 seats)
Party	Candidate	Votes	%	±%
Labour	Michael Edwards*	1,107	50.7	–6.5
Labour	Eunice Regan	1,069	48.9	–18.9
Nottingham Ind.	Neveed Rashid	527	24.1	N/A
Nottingham Ind.	Margo Bohacz	525	24.0	N/A
Green	Ceri Pryke-Hendy	271	12.4	+0.5
Conservative	Felicity Crofts	209	9.6	+2.5
Conservative	Nicholas Packham	205	9.4	+3.6
Liberal Democrats	Michael Thomas	125	5.7	–8.9
Turnout		2,184	31.0	–2.0
Registered electors		7,052		
Labour hold				
Labour hold				

=== Radford ===
Radford (2 seats)
Party	Candidate	Votes	%	±%
Labour	Farzanna Mahmood	759	72.4	−5.4
Labour	Fozia Mubashar	672	64.1	−12.3
Green	William Ellis	249	23.8	N/A
Conservative	Matthew Pike	135	12.9	+5.4
Liberal Democrats	Tom Procter	114	10.9	+0.1
Turnout		1,048	20.3	+3.3
Registered electors		5,152		
Labour hold				
Labour hold				

=== Sherwood ===
Sherwood (3 seats)
Party	Candidate	Votes	%	±%
Labour	Adele Williams	2,367	58.8	−5.0
Labour	AJ Matsiko	2,275	56.5	−5.4
Labour	Nayab Patel	2,075	51.5	−13.6
Nottingham Ind.	Colin Barratt	1,035	25.7	N/A
Nottingham Ind.	Rebecca Green	752	18.7	N/A
Nottingham Ind.	Aimee Scrimshaw	651	16.2	N/A
Green	Rachel Richards	629	15.6	N/A
Green	John Burgess	554	13.8	N/A
Conservative	Sheila Eaton	448	11.1	−3.0
Conservative	Ilona Hart	392	9.7	−3.4
Liberal Democrats	Stephen Freeland	243	6.0	−6.4
Turnout		4,027	36.2	–1.8
Registered electors		11,109		
Labour hold				
Labour hold				
Labour hold				

=== St Ann's ===
St Ann's (3 seats)
Party	Candidate	Votes	%	±%
Labour	Corall Jenkins	1,636	64.7	−7.1
Labour	Anwar Khan	1,412	55.8	−12.7
Labour	Devontay Okure	1,369	54.1	−12.2
Conservative	John Crofts	339	13.4	+1.3
Green	Neil Barrett	323	12.8	N/A
Conservative	Glenys Sullivan	291	11.5	−0.4
Conservative	Boma Thomas	287	11.3	+2.2
Green	Jonnie Walker	280	11.1	N/A
Nottingham Ind.	Gisella Sobarasua	269	10.6	N/A
Nottingham Ind.	Rohey Bah	250	9.9	N/A
Nottingham Ind.	Sam Njie	225	8.9	N/A
Liberal Democrats	James Housley	202	8.0	−3.6
Turnout		2,529	23.3	–0.7
Registered electors		10,872		
Labour hold				
Labour hold				
Labour hold				

=== Wollaton West ===
Wollaton West (3 seats)
Party	Candidate	Votes	%	±%
Labour	Steve Battlemuch	2,815	57.3	+3.8
Labour	Zafran Khan	2,375	48.4	+6.3
Labour	Saj Ahmad	2,290	46.6	−1.0
Conservative	Stuart Frost	1,696	34.5	−0.8
Conservative	Kabir Hussain	1,312	26.7	−3.6
Conservative	Awadh Salim	1,182	24.1	−2.2
Liberal Democrats	Michael Procter	813	16.6	+3.9
Nottingham Ind.	Cinderella Griffiths	499	10.2	N/A
Nottingham Ind.	Joginder Prem	327	6.7	N/A
Nottingham Ind.	Bakhtawar Sehra	224	4.6	N/A
Turnout		4,909	43.5	–5.5
Registered electors		11,273		
Labour hold				
Labour hold				
Labour hold				

== Changes 2023–2027 ==
=== By-elections ===
==== Leen Valley ====
The by-election was triggered by the disqualification of independent councillor Nadia Farhat, who had been elected as a Labour councillor in 2023 before defecting to sit as an independent in October 2023 over the party's stance on the conflict in Gaza, after she failed to attend a qualifying council meeting for six months.

Leen Valley by-election: 20 August 2026
Party	Candidate	Votes	%	±%
Labour	Abbas Hussain	689	30.5	−33.8
People's Alliance	Parveen Begum	523	23.2	N/A
Reform	Stuart Frost	410	18.2	N/A
Green	Hugh McGuinness	378	16.7	N/A
Conservative	Gail Stancliffe	189	8.4	−13.3
Liberal Democrats	Liz Morgan-Danvers	68	3.0	−11.0
Majority		166	7.4	N/A
Turnout		2,266	31.8	−0.3
Registered electors		7,122		
Labour hold				
