= Nottingham Independents =

Local political party in Nottingham, England

- Leader: Kevin Clarke
- Treasurer: Maria Watson
- Nominating Officer: Francesco Lari
- Founder: Francesco Lari
- Founded: 22 January 2018; 8 years ago
- Headquarters: Clifton, Nottinghamshire
- Ideology: Localism
- Nottingham City Council: 3 / 55
- Nottinghamshire County Council: 0 / 67
- Gedling Borough Council: 0 / 41
- St Albans Parish Council: 1 / 9

Website
- nottinghamindependents.co.uk

The Nottingham Independents is a political party based in the area of Nottingham City in Nottinghamshire, England. It was officially registered in January 2018, by the former chairman of the city's branch of UKIP, Francesco Lari. The party modelled itself on the Ashfield Independents and planned to contest elections in the area of Nottingham. The party became the largest opposition group in Nottingham City Council after the 2019 elections (won by the Labour Party).

== History ==
The party gained its first councillor when Sarah Hewson, elected as a Conservative to Gedling Borough Council, joined the Nottingham Independents in March 2018.

The first election contested by the party was the Clifton North by-election on 27 September 2018, where the party came third with 11% of the vote share.

In the 2019 Nottingham City Council election the party put forward seven candidates across five wards. The party published a city manifesto for the election. The party gained three councillors for the Clifton East Ward, making the Nottingham Independents the largest opposition party on the council.

In preparation for the 2023 City council election, the party released a manifesto, which included policies such as saving youth centres, building more social housing, and petitioning the government for more support for people through the cost of living crisis. The party held its three seats and received 10% of votes cast.

== See also ==
- Ashfield Independents
- Broxtowe Alliance
- Nottingham People's Alliance
