= 2019 Nottingham City Council election =

2 May 2019 election of all 55 members to Nottingham City Council across 20 wards

- 2 May 2019

All 55 seats to Nottingham City Council 28 seats needed for a majority
- Turnout: 29%
	First party	Second party	Third party
Leader	Jon Collins	Francesco Lari	Andrew Rule
Party	Labour	Nottingham Ind.	Conservative
Seats before	52	0	3
Seats won	50	3	2
Seat change	-2	+3	-1
- Map of the results of the 2019 election

The 2019 elections to Nottingham City Council were held on 2 May 2019 to elect all 55 members to the council across 20 wards.

== Overall results ==
In total, Labour won 50 seats, the Nottingham Independents won 3 and the Conservatives won 2. Turnout was 29%.

Nottingham City Council election, 2019
Party	Candidates						Votes		
Party	Stood	Elected	Gained	Unseated	Net	% of total	%	No.	Net %
Labour	55	50	0	2	-2	91.0	62.6	97,089	
Nottingham Ind.	7	3	3	0	+3	5.0	4.4	6,831	
Conservative	55	2	0	1	-1	4.0	18.5	28,727	
Liberal Democrats	33	0	0	0	0	0.0	6.7	10,420	
Green	14	0	0	0	0	0.0	5.5	8,601	
UKIP	5	0	0	0	0	0.0	1.6	2,428	
Independent	3	0	0	0	0	0.0	0.5	797	
Bus-Pass Elvis	1	0	0	0	0	0.0	0.1	82	

== Results by ward ==
Source: Sandeman, Kit (4 May 2019). "Full list of candidates for Nottingham City Council elections 2019". Nottingham Post. Reach plc. Archived from the original on 24 June 2020.

=== Aspley ===
Aspley (3)
Party	Candidate	Votes	%
Labour	Graham Ransley Chapman	2,112	74.1
Labour	Carole Williams McCulloch	1,988	69.8
Labour	Patience Uloma Ifediora	1,896	66.5
Independent	Bill Ottewell	452	15.9
Conservative	Thomas James Connelly	299	10.5
Liberal Democrats	John Calvert	263	9.2
Conservative	Connor Neil Malone	259	9.1
Conservative	Nicholas John Packham	235	8.2
Turnout		2894	25%

=== Basford ===
Basford (3)
Party	Candidate	Votes	%
Labour	Nick Raine	1,710	56.7
Labour	Linda Mary Woodings	1,656	54.9
Labour	Salma Mumtaz	1,535	50.9
Nottingham Ind.	Wayne Anthony Unczur	682	22.6
Conservative	Rebecca Sarah Ironmonger	577	19.1
Conservative	Ian Culley	553	18.3
Green	Andrew Guy Jones	525	17.4
Conservative	Esi Aboni	434	14.4
Liberal Democrats	Tadeusz Zdzislaw Edward Jones	279	9.2
Turnout		3045	26%

=== Berridge ===
Berridge (3)
Party	Candidate	Votes	%
Labour	Angela Kandola	2,369	66.3
Labour	Toby Charles Neal	2,213	61.9
Labour	Shuguftah Jabeen Quddoos	2,205	61.7
Green	Ellie Mitchell	888	24.9
Green	Ted Salt	613	17.2
Conservative	Susan Jane Brittain	461	12.9
Conservative	Francis James Desmond Hull	409	11.4
Liberal Democrats	Richard James Minkley	379	10.6
Conservative	Anthony Neale Gerald Mittenshaw-Hodge	337	9.4
Turnout		3610	33%

=== Bestwood ===
Bestwood (3)
Party	Candidate	Votes	%
Labour	Jay Michael Hayes	1,607	53.0
Labour	Georgia Emily Power	1,328	43.8
Labour	Audra Marie Wynter	1,303	43.0
Nottingham Ind.	Francesco Lari	1,195	39.4
UKIP	Alan John Margerison	677	22.3
UKIP	Lawrence George Payne	657	21.7
Conservative	Lewis Blight	325	10.7
Conservative	Julie Ann Hallett	316	10.4
Liberal Democrats	Christina Morgan-Danvers	232	7.6
Conservative	Roger Frederick Wykes	212	7.0
Turnout		3047	25%

=== Bilborough ===
Bilborough (3)
Party	Candidate	Votes	%
Labour	Wendy Barbara Smith	2,114	64.3
Labour	Phil Jackson	2,012	61.2
Labour	Rebecca Cerin Langton	1,866	56.8
Green	Tony Stock	645	19.6
Conservative	Roger David Alton	574	17.5
Conservative	David Harry Gillott	549	16.7
Conservative	Alistair Dudley Hudson	516	15.7
Liberal Democrats	Liz Morgan-Danvers	417	12.7
Turnout		3356	27%

=== Bulwell ===
Bulwell (3)
Party	Candidate	Votes	%
Labour	Jane Lakey	1,668	61.5
Labour	Maria Joannou	1,439	53.0
Labour	Ethan Benjamin Radford	1,371	50.5
Nottingham Ind.	Graham Stuart Palk	839	30.9
Conservative	David Johnson	476	17.5
Conservative	Veronica Helena Pole	402	14.8
Conservative	Giles Julian Stratton	366	13.5
Liberal Democrats	Daniel Gordo-Holmes	308	11.3
Turnout		2761	24%

=== Bulwell Forest ===
Bulwell Forest (3)
Party	Candidate	Votes	%
Labour	Eunice Fay Campbell-Clark	1,903	58.8
Labour	Cheryl Margaret Barnard	1,797	55.5
Labour	Samuel James Gardiner	1,691	52.2
Nottingham Ind.	Jeff Kilbourne	782	24.1
Conservative	Joanna Louise Husted	751	23.2
Conservative	Glyn Walter Johns	633	19.5
Conservative	Alfred Stephen Pryor	559	17.3
Liberal Democrats	Michael Howard Procter	253	7.8
Turnout		3274	31%

=== Castle ===
Castle (2)
Party	Candidate	Votes	%
Labour	Angharad Roberts	800	42.1
Labour	Sam Webster	772	40.6
Liberal Democrats	Stephen Paul Freeland	573	30.2
Liberal Democrats	Tony Bernard Sutton	446	23.5
Green	Liam Elliott McClelland	370	19.5
Conservative	Nick Max	344	18.1
Conservative	Paul Vincent Ruane	299	15.7
Bus-Pass Elvis	David Laurence Bishop	82	4.3
Turnout		1912	29%

=== Clifton East ===
Clifton East (3)
Party	Candidate	Votes	%
Nottingham Ind.	Maria Ann Watson	1,456	44.2
Nottingham Ind.	Kirsty Jones	1,382	42.0
Nottingham Ind.	Kevin Clarke	1,334	40.5
Labour	Joshua Johnathan Callum Cook	1,305	39.7
Labour	Chris Gibson	1,144	34.8
Labour	Corall Joy Jenkins	1,074	32.6
Conservative	Andrew Price	435	13.2
Conservative	Caroline Kampila	381	11.6
Conservative	William Raymond Scott	336	10.2
Liberal Democrats	Diane Jean Rotherham	204	6.2
Turnout		3310	26%

=== Clifton West ===
Clifton West (2)
Party	Candidate	Votes	%
Conservative	Andrew James Peter Rule	1,649	57.2
Conservative	Roger David Steel	1,609	55.8
Labour	Phil Spear	987	34.2
Labour	Maria Claire Fawcett	886	30.7
Liberal Democrats	Rahul Soni	273	9.5
Turnout		2957	39%

=== Dales ===
Dales (3)
Party	Candidate	Votes	%
Labour	David Mellen	2,499	69.0
Labour	Gul Nawaz Khan	2,190	60.4
Labour	Neghat Nawaz Khan	2,185	60.3
Green	Dawn Kathleen Plumb	668	18.4
Green	Natalie Hurst	631	17.4
Conservative	Daniel John Atherton	549	15.2
Conservative	Gwendoline Mary Duncan	531	14.7
Conservative	Neil James Harbinson	492	13.6
Liberal Democrats	Gary Long	309	8.5
Turnout		3657	32%

=== Hyson Green and Arboretum ===
Hyson Green and Arboretum (3)
Party	Candidate	Votes	%
Labour	Merlita Bryan	2,208	79.4
Labour	Azad Hussain Choudhry	2,105	75.7
Labour	Jawaid Khalil	2,019	72.6
Conservative	Andrew Byrne	294	10.6
Liberal Democrats	Alison Rouse	264	9.5
Conservative	Alan John Duncan	260	9.4
Conservative	Margaret Helena Trueman	259	9.3
Liberal Democrats	Rachel Errin Joanna Saunders	236	8.5
Liberal Democrats	Benedict Henry Usborne Cross	217	7.8
Turnout		2821	24%

=== Leen Valley ===
Leen Valley (2)
Party	Candidate	Votes	%
Labour	Audrey Jane Dinnall	1,388	63.6
Labour	Mohammed Saghir	1,258	57.6
Conservative	David Peter Robert Gibson	488	22.4
Conservative	Gail Janise Stancliffe	440	20.2
Liberal Democrats	James Robert Lloyd	290	13.3
Liberal Democrats	Rebecca Lucy Stephen Procter	285	13.1
Turnout		2219	34%

=== Lenton and Wollaton East ===
Lenton and Wollaton East (3)
Party	Candidate	Votes	%
Labour	Sally Ann Longford	1,762	67.6
Labour	David Trimble	1,582	60.7
Labour	Pavlos Kotsonis	1,527	58.6
Green	Adam Fergus McGregor	412	15.8
Conservative	Brigitte Amber Dorothy Armstrong	379	14.5
Conservative	Brenda Joyce Barber	374	14.3
Conservative	Paul Jonathan Brittain	353	13.5
Green	Barbara Ann Warren	347	13.3
Liberal Democrats	Elizabeth Sheila Barnard	241	9.2
Liberal Democrats	Doreen Irene Smalley	230	8.8
Liberal Democrats	Luke Bradley Stott	182	7.0
Turnout		2635	21%

=== Mapperley ===
Mapperley (3)
Party	Candidate	Votes	%
Labour	Leslie Eni-Itan Ayoola	1,840	51.4
Labour	Rosemary Elizabeth Caroline Healy	1,795	50.2
Labour	Sajid Mohammed	1,503	42.0
Green	Cath Wakeman	980	27.4
Green	Neil Barrett	806	22.5
Conservative	John Lester Firth	684	19.1
Green	Jonathan Clive Walker	680	19.0
Conservative	Penelope Anne Messenger	663	18.5
Conservative	Alexander Ewan Lamont	665	18.6
Liberal Democrats	Peter Charles Mendenhall	330	9.2
Liberal Democrats	Alexander James Foster	321	9.0
Turnout		3617	32%

=== Meadows ===
Meadows (2)
Party	Candidate	Votes	%
Labour	Nicola Clare Heaton	1,540	67.8
Labour	Michael Mountford Edwards	1,299	57.2
Independent	Jonathan Duncan Stuart Hughes	345	15.2
Liberal Democrats	Saghir Akhtar	331	14.6
Green	Ceri Pryke-Hendy	271	11.9
Liberal Democrats	Barry Ian Holliday	168	7.4
Conservative	Felicity Marion Whiting Crofts	162	7.1
Conservative	Bradley Richard Wing	131	5.8
Turnout		2283	33%

=== Radford ===
Radford (2)
Party	Candidate	Votes	%
Labour	Anne Sara Peach	1,022	77.8
Labour	Hassan Ahmed	1,003	76.4
Liberal Democrats	Jacqueline Hale	142	10.8
Liberal Democrats	Ian Reginald Hale	123	9.4
Conservative	Janet Scott	99	7.5
Conservative	Riyen Hitesh Karia	87	6.6
Turnout		1335	17%

=== Sherwood ===
Sherwood (3)
Party	Candidate	Votes	%
Labour	Lauren O'Grady	2,773	65.1
Labour	Adele Williams	2,715	63.8
Labour	AJ Matsiko	2,634	61.9
Conservative	Jackie Jenkin-Jones	599	14.1
Conservative	David Barnaby John Hughes	556	13.1
Liberal Democrats	Lorenzo Mark Salzano	529	12.4
Liberal Democrats	John Henry Burr	490	11.5
Conservative	Marjorie Anne Wroughton	481	11.3
Liberal Democrats	Maximilian Paul Zambo	406	9.5
UKIP	Irenea Marriott	372	8.7
UKIP	Andrew William Taylor	365	8.6
UKIP	Fran Loi	357	8.4
Turnout		4287	38%

=== St Ann's ===
St Ann's (3)
Party	Candidate	Votes	%
Labour	Sue Johnson	1,990	71.8
Labour	Chantal Marie Lee	1,900	68.5
Labour	Dave Liversidge	1,838	66.3
Independent	Cynthia May James	434	15.7
Conservative	Luke Fintan Dorian	335	12.1
Conservative	Georgia-Mae Louise Chung	329	11.9
Liberal Democrats	James Housley	322	11.6
Conservative	Melvyn Alfred Shepherd	252	9.1
Turnout		2812	24%

=== Wollaton West ===
Wollaton West (3)
Party	Candidate	Votes	%
Labour	Steve Battlemuch	2,901	53.5
Labour	Cate Woodward	2,579	47.6
Labour	Zafran Nawaz Khan	2,283	42.1
Conservative	Jim Armstrong	1,911	35.3
Conservative	Carl James Husted*	1,641	30.3
Conservative	Marcus Thomas Jones	1,427	26.3
Green	David John Rhodes	765	14.1
Liberal Democrats	Michael Ian Thomas	687	12.7
Liberal Democrats	Bill Smith	476	8.8
Liberal Democrats	Niall Garratt	446	8.2
Turnout		5460	49%

- Carl James Husted (suspended by the Conservative Party after comparing people who voted for Remain in the 2016 United Kingdom European Union membership referendum to those who voted for the Nazi Party)

== Changes 2019–2023 ==
=== By-elections ===
==== St. Ann's ====
The by-election was triggered by the resignation of Labour councillor Chantal Lee.

St. Ann's: 7 October 2021
Party	Candidate	Votes	%	±%
Labour	Corall Jenkins	1,048	65.5	+0.9
Nottingham Ind.	Francesco Lari	204	12.7	N/A
Conservative	Ngoc Tran	193	12.1	+1.2
Green	Barbara Coulson	92	5.7	N/A
Liberal Democrats	James Housley	40	2.5	−8.0
TUSC	Florence Chadwick	24	1.5	N/A
Majority		844	52.8	
Turnout		1,601	14.2	
Registered electors		11,392		
Labour hold		Swing	▼5.9	

==== Sherwood ====
The by-election was triggered by the resignation of Labour councillor Lauren O'Grady.

Sherwood: 7 October 2021
Party	Candidate	Votes	%	±%
Labour	Nayab Patel	1,174	47.8	−17.1
Nottingham Ind.	Colin Barratt	629	25.6	N/A
Conservative	Stephen Pryor	320	13.0	−1.0
Green	Catriona Sibert	195	7.9	N/A
TUSC	Geraint Thomas	76	3.1	N/A
Liberal Democrats	Alison Rouse	63	2.6	−9.8
Majority		545	22.2	
Turnout		2,457	22.3	
Registered electors		11,037		
Labour hold		Swing	▼21.4	
