= 2007 Nottingham City Council election =

2007 UK local government election

- 3 May 2007

All 55 seats to Nottingham City Council 28 seats needed for a majority
| Leader | Jon Collins | Michael Cowan | Gary Long |
| Party | Labour | Conservative | Liberal Democrats |
| Leader's seat | St Ann's | Wollaton West | Leen Valley |
| Last election | 36 | 8 | 11 |
- Nottingham ward map following the 2007 election

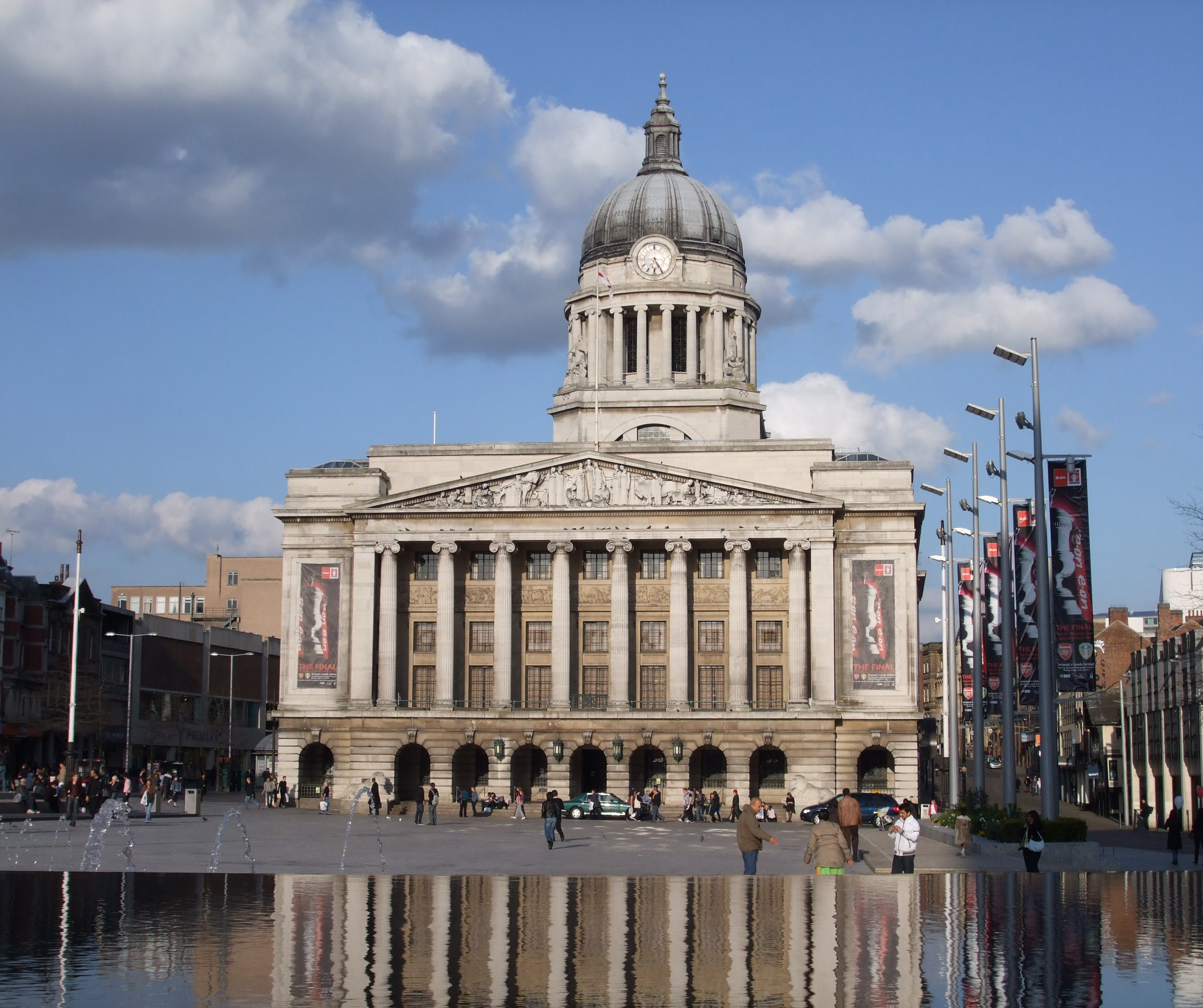
Nottingham Council House

The 2007 elections to Nottingham City Council were held on 3 May 2007 to elect all 55 members to the council.

== Overall result ==
A total of 55 councillors were elected from 20 wards in the city.

Nottingham local election result 2007
| Party | Seats | Gains | Losses | Net gain/loss | Seats % | Votes % | Votes | +/− |
|---|---|---|---|---|---|---|---|---|
| Labour | 42 | | | | 76.4 | 46.7 | 76,731 | |
| Conservative | 7 | | | | 12.7 | 32.4 | 53,186 | |
| Liberal Democrats | 6 | | | | 10.9 | 17.0 | 27,852 | |
| Green | 0 | 0 | 0 | 0 | 0.0 | 1.9 | 3,177 | |
| UKIP | 0 | 0 | 0 | 0 | 0.0 | 1.4 | 2,280 | |
| Independent | 0 | 0 | 0 | 0 | 0.0 | 0.5 | 804 | |
| Church of the Militant Elvis | 0 | 0 | 0 | 0 | 0.0 | 0.1 | 115 | |

== Results by ward ==
=== Arboretum ===
Arboretum ward (2 seats)
| Party | Candidate | Votes | % |
|---|---|---|---|
| Labour | Merlita Bryan-Hilton | 691 | 24.0 |
| Liberal Democrats | Anthony George Marshall | 649 | 22.5 |
| Labour | Toby Charles Neal | 639 | 22.2 |
| Liberal Democrats | David Tom Stephenson | 602 | 20.9 |
| Conservative | Adam William Poole | 162 | 5.6 |
| Conservative | Warren James Tarling | 136 | 4.7 |
| Turnout | | | 22.64 |

=== Aspley ===
Aspley ward (3 seats)
| Party | Candidate | Votes | % |
|---|---|---|---|
| Labour | Graham Ransley Chapman | 1,761 | 25.5 |
| Labour | Leon Unczur | 1,544 | 22.4 |
| Labour | Hylton Beresford James | 1,506 | 21.8 |
| Conservative | Derek Roy Chawner | 527 | 7.6 |
| Conservative | Sheila June Eaton | 513 | 7.4 |
| Conservative | Barry Donald Thurnell | 382 | 5.5 |
| Liberal Democrats | Stephen Paul Hill | 338 | 4.9 |
| UKIP | Jennie Raymond | 333 | 4.8 |
| Turnout | | | 25.91 |

=== Basford ===
Basford ward (3 seats)
| Party | Candidate | Votes | % |
|---|---|---|---|
| Labour | Robert Andrew Lee | 1,991 | 18.5 |
| Labour | Catherine Louise Mary Arnold Adams | 1,919 | 17.8 |
| Labour | Michael James Newton | 1,831 | 17.0 |
| Conservative | Jane Philippa Adkin | 1,128 | 10.5 |
| Conservative | Sean Patrick Healy | 1,114 | 10.3 |
| Conservative | Abey Stevenson | 932 | 8.7 |
| Liberal Democrats | Marian Whyley | 689 | 6.4 |
| Liberal Democrats | Andrew John Howarth | 589 | 5.5 |
| Liberal Democrats | Timothy Simon Ball | 582 | 5.4 |
| Turnout | | | 34.73 |

=== Berridge ===
Berridge ward (3 seats)
| Party | Candidate | Votes | % |
|---|---|---|---|
| Labour | Carole Ann Jones | 1,850 | 14.9 |
| Labour | Mohammed Ibrahim | 1,794 | 14.5 |
| Labour | Hassan Ahmed | 1,596 | 12.9 |
| Liberal Democrats | John Henry Burr | 1,576 | 12.7 |
| Liberal Democrats | Tariq Mahmood | 1,491 | 12.0 |
| Liberal Democrats | Ehsan Ghazni | 1,401 | 11.3 |
| Conservative | James Aidan Fields | 743 | 6.0 |
| Green | Arthur Michael Chappell | 627 | 5.1 |
| Conservative | Sajad Hamed | 567 | 4.6 |
| Conservative | Abdul Aziz Javed | 518 | 4.2 |
| UKIP | Alan John Margerison | 223 | 1.8 |
| Turnout | | | 44.77 |

=== Bestwood ===
Bestwood ward (3 seats)
| Party | Candidate | Votes | % |
|---|---|---|---|
| Labour | Brian Grocock | 1,775 | 23.4 |
| Labour | David Smith | 1,367 | 18.0 |
| Labour | Michael Wildgust | 1,362 | 17.9 |
| Conservative | John Hutchinson | 837 | 11.0 |
| Conservative | Felicity Marion Whiting Crofts | 806 | 10.6 |
| Conservative | John Anthony Crofts | 785 | 10.3 |
| Liberal Democrats | Andrew George Peck | 666 | 8.8 |
| Turnout | | | 26.40 |

=== Bilborough ===
Bilborough ward (3 seats)
| Party | Candidate | Votes | % |
|---|---|---|---|
| Labour | Derek John Cresswell | 1,877 | 20.7 |
| Labour | Malcolm Arthur Wood | 1,774 | 19.5 |
| Labour | Marcia Watson | 1,588 | 17.5 |
| Conservative | Craig Cox | 889 | 9.8 |
| Conservative | Robert Michael Hurley | 858 | 9.4 |
| Conservative | Matthew Gerald Walter Gayle | 832 | 9.2 |
| Liberal Democrats | John Christopher Calvert | 820 | 9.0 |
| Independent | Eric Ernest Walker | 449 | 4.9 |
| Turnout | | | 31.65 |

=== Bridge ===
Bridge ward (2 seats)
| Party | Candidate | Votes | % |
|---|---|---|---|
| Liberal Democrats | Saghir Akhtar | 990 | 23.2 |
| Labour | Ian MacLennan | 908 | 21.3 |
| Labour | Sarah Piper | 859 | 20.2 |
| Liberal Democrats | Anthony John Gillam | 705 | 16.6 |
| Conservative | Peter Alistair Beynon | 268 | 6.3 |
| Independent | Richard Peter Gutteridge | 268 | 6.3 |
| Conservative | Vera Cross | 260 | 6.1 |
| Turnout | | | 28.49 |

=== Bulwell ===
Bulwell ward (3 seats)
| Party | Candidate | Votes | % |
|---|---|---|---|
| Labour | Virginia Ann Klein | 1,457 | 18.8 |
| Labour | Eileen Margaret Elizabeth Heppell | 1,382 | 17.8 |
| Labour | John Alan Hartshorne | 1,308 | 16.9 |
| Conservative | Stephanie Stewardson | 1,077 | 13.9 |
| Conservative | Christina Orsola Mittenshaw-Hodge | 711 | 9.7 |
| Conservative | Nina Petryszyn | 678 | 8.8 |
| Liberal Democrats | Craig Charles Turner | 577 | 7.5 |
| UKIP | Trevor Alan Rose | 558 | 7.2 |
| Turnout | | | 30.03 |

=== Bulwell Forest ===
Bulwell Forest ward (3 seats)
| Party | Candidate | Votes | % |
|---|---|---|---|
| Labour | Alan Michael Clark | 1,944 | 16.3 |
| Labour | Eunice Fay Campbell-Clark | 1,930 | 16.2 |
| Conservative | Gerald Edward Davie | 1,914 | 16.1 |
| Labour | Gillian Haymes | 1,835 | 15.4 |
| Conservative | Rachel Elizabeth Goodinson | 1,794 | 15.1 |
| Conservative | Anthony Neale Gerald Mittenshaw-Hodge | 1,543 | 13.0 |
| Liberal Democrats | Neil Edward Littlewood | 540 | 4.5 |
| UKIP | Anthony Robin Ellwood | 394 | 3.3 |
| Turnout | | | 42.91 |

=== Clifton North ===
Clifton North ward (3 seats)
| Party | Candidate | Votes | % |
|---|---|---|---|
| Conservative | Brendan Clarke-Smith | 1,883 | 19.7 |
| Conservative | Timothy John Spencer | 1,749 | 18.3 |
| Conservative | Andrew Mark Price | 1,694 | 17.7 |
| Labour | Philip Andrew Spear | 1,265 | 13.3 |
| Labour | Jill Anne Judy Belshaw | 1,164 | 12.2 |
| Labour | Norman George Packer | 1,087 | 11.4 |
| Liberal Democrats | Arthur Leonard Hinchley | 389 | 4.1 |
| Liberal Democrats | Mohammad Ali | 320 | 3.4 |
| Turnout | | | 34.71 |

=== Clifton South ===
Clifton South ward (3 seats)
| Party | Candidate | Votes | % |
|---|---|---|---|
| Labour | Ian William Malcolm | 1,600 | 19.6 |
| Labour | Christopher Gibson | 1,457 | 17.9 |
| Labour | Jeannie Audrey Packer | 1,378 | 16.9 |
| Conservative | Ann Lesley Alderson | 952 | 11.7 |
| Conservative | Ian Culley | 942 | 11.6 |
| Conservative | Jonathon Ho | 836 | 10.3 |
| Liberal Democrats | Stephen Kilpin | 511 | 6.3 |
| Liberal Democrats | Paul John Weston | 477 | 5.9 |
| Turnout | | | 29.54 |

=== Dales ===
Dales ward (3 seats)
| Party | Candidate | Votes | % |
|---|---|---|---|
| Labour | Gul Nawaz Khan | 1,641 | 15.7 |
| Labour | David Mellen | 1,548 | 14.8 |
| Labour | Kenneth Lawrence Williams | 1,487 | 14.2 |
| Conservative | Mahfuz Hussain | 1,091 | 10.4 |
| Conservative | Charles Arthur Clarke | 1,086 | 10.4 |
| Conservative | Mohammed Maqsood | 897 | 8.6 |
| Liberal Democrats | Glyn Walter Johns | 761 | 7.3 |
| Liberal Democrats | John Sandford Cornish | 735 | 7.0 |
| Liberal Democrats | Jawed Akhtar Abbasi | 725 | 6.9 |
| Green | Edward Peter Claringbold | 476 | 4.6 |
| Turnout | | | 35.52 |

=== Dunkirk and Lenton ===
Dunkirk and Lenton ward (2 seats)
| Party | Candidate | Votes | % |
|---|---|---|---|
| Labour | David Trimble | 640 | 27.8 |
| Labour | Zahoor Elahi Mir | 600 | 26.1 |
| Conservative | Hamish Ian Stewart | 265 | 11.5 |
| Conservative | Edward John Gerald Keene | 261 | 11.3 |
| Green | Andrew Black | 193 | 8.4 |
| Liberal Democrats | John William Stewart Lubbock | 169 | 7.3 |
| Liberal Democrats | Marc McLaughlin | 118 | 5.1 |
| UKIP | Christopher Sneap | 56 | 2.4 |
| Turnout | | | 25.52 |

=== Leen Valley ===
Leen Valley ward (2 seats)
| Party | Candidate | Votes | % |
|---|---|---|---|
| Liberal Democrats | Gary David Long | 1,449 | 27.5 |
| Liberal Democrats | Alexander James Foster | 1,346 | 25.5 |
| Labour | Mahboob Dildar | 713 | 13.5 |
| Labour | Michael John Johnson | 649 | 12.3 |
| Conservative | David Peter Robert Gibson | 615 | 11.7 |
| Conservative | Mohammed Suleman | 503 | 9.5 |
| Turnout | | | 39.19 |

=== Mapperley ===
Mapperley ward (3 seats)
| Party | Candidate | Votes | % |
|---|---|---|---|
| Labour | Emily Adelaide Kate Dewinton | 1,744 | 16.1 |
| Labour | Michael Mountford Edwards | 1,649 | 15.3 |
| Labour | Mohammed Munir Choudhary | 1,541 | 14.3 |
| Conservative | William James Dennis | 1,475 | 13.7 |
| Conservative | Alexander Ewan Lamont | 1,342 | 12.4 |
| Conservative | Dean Elmer Fischer | 1,319 | 12.2 |
| Green | Jane Margaret Ryan Carruthers | 635 | 5.9 |
| Liberal Democrats | John Francis Hay | 524 | 4.9 |
| Liberal Democrats | Ishtiaq Haq | 347 | 3.2 |
| Liberal Democrats | Zulqurein Yousaf | 231 | 2.1 |
| Turnout | | | 34.67 |

=== Radford and Park ===
Radford and Park ward (3 seats)
| Party | Candidate | Votes | % |
|---|---|---|---|
| Labour | Katrina Elizabeth Mary Bull | 1,351 | 17.3 |
| Labour | Mohammad Aslam | 1,247 | 15.9 |
| Labour | Afzal Khan | 1,173 | 15.0 |
| Conservative | Lawrence Charles Alger | 888 | 11.3 |
| Conservative | Rebecca Ann Charlotte Toates | 868 | 11.1 |
| Conservative | David Michael Outterside | 865 | 11.1 |
| Liberal Democrats | Jacqueline Hale | 511 | 6.5 |
| Liberal Democrats | Ian Reginald Hale | 466 | 6.0 |
| Liberal Democrats | Lorenzo Anthony Cherin | 462 | 5.9 |
| Turnout | | | 27.22 |

=== Sherwood ===
Sherwood ward (3 seats)
| Party | Candidate | Votes | % |
|---|---|---|---|
| Labour | Penny Griggs | 2,101 | 16.8 |
| Labour | Brian Parbutt | 1,926 | 15.4 |
| Labour | Jane Urquhart | 1,879 | 15.0 |
| Conservative | Joshua Harm David Livestro | 1,311 | 10.5 |
| Conservative | James Grant Thornton | 1,302 | 10.4 |
| Conservative | Roger David Steel | 1,245 | 10.0 |
| Green | Benjamin Robert Hoare | 748 | 6.0 |
| Liberal Democrats | Ann Venning Bourke | 699 | 5.6 |
| Liberal Democrats | David Peter Skinner | 613 | 4.9 |
| Liberal Democrats | Peter Charles Mendenhall | 451 | 3.6 |
| UKIP | Irenea Marriott | 233 | 1.9 |
| Turnout | | | 41.24 |

=== St Ann's ===
St Ann's ward (3 seats)
| Party | Candidate | Votes | % |
|---|---|---|---|
| Labour | Jonathan Neil Collins | 1,648 | 24.4 |
| Labour | Evelyn Susan Johnson | 1,523 | 22.5 |
| Labour | David Liversidge | 1,471 | 21.7 |
| Conservative | Julian Francis Helby Nicholson | 474 | 7.0 |
| Conservative | Barbara Tuck | 455 | 6.7 |
| Conservative | Avryl Barbara Whitehead | 450 | 6.7 |
| Liberal Democrats | Haroon Ethasham Ghazni | 251 | 3.7 |
| Liberal Democrats | Dora Maria Kostiuk | 248 | 3.7 |
| Liberal Democrats | Khalid Mahmood | 246 | 3.6 |
| Turnout | | | 25.74 |

=== Wollaton East and Lenton Abbey ===
Wollaton East and Lenton Abbey (2 seats)
| Party | Candidate | Votes | % |
|---|---|---|---|
| Liberal Democrats | David Ronald Oldham | 673 | 22.4 |
| Liberal Democrats | Tony Bernard Sutton | 672 | 22.4 |
| Conservative | Jeremy Nigel Alderson | 539 | 17.9 |
| Conservative | Elaine Ryley | 522 | 17.4 |
| Labour | Elisabeth Kate Morris | 276 | 9.2 |
| Labour | Howard Morris | 236 | 7.9 |
| Independent | Jacob Charles Vincent | 87 | 2.9 |
| Turnout | | | 24.04 |

=== Wollaton West ===
Wollaton West (3 seats)
| Party | Candidate | Votes | % |
|---|---|---|---|
| Conservative | Georgina Jane Culley | 2,670 | 19.1 |
| Conservative | Michael Cowan | 2,408 | 17.2 |
| Conservative | Richard Stuart Alistair Benson | 2,305 | 16.5 |
| Labour | Linda Mary Woodings | 1,169 | 8.4 |
| Labour | Alexander Christopher Athow Ball | 1,097 | 7.9 |
| Labour | Christine Shawcroft | 1,013 | 7.3 |
| Liberal Democrats | Akhlaq Ahmed | 805 | 5.8 |
| Liberal Democrats | James William Elliot Smith | 744 | 5.3 |
| Liberal Democrats | Brian Arthur Markin | 667 | 4.8 |
| Green | Robert Adam Crich | 498 | 3.6 |
| UKIP | Christopher Paul Cobb | 483 | 3.5 |
| Church of the Militant Elvis | David Laurence Bishop | 115 | 0.8 |
| Turnout | | | 45.99 |
