= Church of the Militant Elvis Party =

Joke political party in the United Kingdom

- Leader: David Bishop
- Founded: 15 May 2001
- Headquarters: Nottingham, England
- Ideology: Political satire

The Church of the Militant Elvis Party was a frivolous political party in the United Kingdom. The leader of the party was David Bishop (1944–2022), who went by the nicknames of 'Lord Biro' and 'Bus-pass Elvis'. The party had seven registered campaign groups: 'Bus-pass Elvis', 'Elvis Defence League', 'Elvis turns Green', 'Militant Elvis Anti-Tesco Popular Front' (MEAT-PF), the 'Elvis and the Yeti Himalayan Preservation', and 'Militant Elvis Anti-HS2'.

The party was concerned with the depletion of the Amazon rainforest, climate change, the power of Tesco on the British high street and the power of large corporations. A book on Elvis Presley noted that "an obviously ironic attitude toward Elvis is used in the service of rather serious anti-imperialist political objectives". It deregistered in December 2008, but re-registered in March 2010 and stood in the 2010 general election in Kettering, gaining 112 votes. It deregistered in November 2023.

== Electoral history ==
Bishop stood in the 1997 general election in Tatton against Neil Hamilton as "Lord Byro versus the Scallywag Tories", gaining 116 votes (0.2%).

He first stood as the Church of the Militant Elvis in the 2001 General Election in Brentwood, where the party came last with 52 votes. Bishop stood in the same seat as then Veritas politician Robert Kilroy-Silk in the 2005 General Election in Erewash. He promised to place giant photos of celebrities at airports "to discourage undesirable foreigners from entering Britain", to have a public inquiry into British vets' fees, to go to Antarctica and shout at icebergs to "stop melting", to "present Mr Blair with an Oscar for his marvellous performance as a sincere politician", to give Kilroy-Silk a job as "keeper of the Royal stool", and to preserve the red squirrel. He campaigned in a red cat suit, and says he was heckled while campaigning. The party gained 116 votes and again came in last place.

Bishop stood again as one of 26 candidates in the 2008 Haltemprice and Howden by-election, on a platform of overthrowing the capitalist state, due to it turning Elvis into a "fat media joke". He argued that George W. Bush is the anti-Christ, and campaigned to imprison Cherie Blair to prevent her reporting details of her sex life, and to place CCTV in the bedroom of Nick Clegg. He came 17th with 44 votes (0.2%).

Campaign pledges for the 2010 general election for Kettering included filling in potholes, bringing back dog licences, introducing moats around houses, Bono for Pope, turning public schools into pound shops, and keeping public lavatories.

Bishop stood for election in the Oldham East and Saddleworth by-election on 13 January 2011 as the candidate for the Bus-Pass Elvis Party, gaining 67 votes (0.1% of votes).

In the Corby by-election on 15 November 2012, as candidate for the Elvis Loves Pets party, Bishop came 10th out of 14 candidates, with 99 votes (0.28% of votes).

On 28 February 2013, Bishop stood in the 2013 Eastleigh by-election as a candidate for the Elvis Loves Pets party, registering 72 votes (0.17%).

On 6 March 2014, standing as the Bus-Pass Elvis Party, Bishop won 2.3% of the vote in a by-election for the Clifton North ward of Nottingham City Council, taking fourth place in the election, ahead of the Liberal Democrats.

On 20 October 2016, Bishop stood in the 2016 Witney by-election as a candidate for the Bus-Pass Elvis Party.

Bishop stood in the Sleaford and North Hykeham by-election on 8 December 2016 as a candidate for the Bus-Pass Elvis Party and received 55 votes.

In January 2017, Bishop announced that he had decided to retire from running in elections. Despite this, he stood as one of six candidates in the election of a councillor to Nottingham City Council for the Sherwood ward that took place on 4 May 2017. In the by-election, which was triggered by the resignation of Labour councillor Alex Ball, he represented the "Elvis & The Yeti Himalayan Preservation" Party and his manifesto called on "Donald Trump and Mrs May not to launch a joint military strike on North Korea in case a faulty missile from a Trident submarine misses Kim Jong Un and hits Tibet."

In September 2018, Bishop again stood in a Nottingham City Council by-election for the Clifton North ward under the Bus-Pass Elvis Party description. Bishop received 46 votes

Bishop stood for the "Elvis & The Yeti Himalayan Preservation" Party in the 2017 general election in the Nottingham East constituency. His manifesto for the election stated that if "cannabis is ever legalised it should be nationalised and called BRITISH GRASS".

In the 2019 general election, Bishop stood in Broxtowe, formerly held by Anna Soubry, and came last with 172 votes.

In the Birmingham Erdington by-election held in March 2022, Bishop stood and came last with 8 votes.

Bishop died in December 2022, aged 78, having been diagnosed with a brain tumour the month before.

== See also ==
- List of frivolous political parties
