= Nottingham City Council =

Non-metropolitan district council for the unitary authority of Nottingham

Type
- Type: Unitary authority

Leadership
- Lord Mayor: Cheryl Bernard, Labour since 11 May 2026
- Leader: Neghat Khan, Labour since 20 May 2024
- Chief Executive: Sajeeda Rose since 5 August 2024

Structure
- Seats: 55 councillors
- Graph of the party split among 55 seats.
- Political groups: Administration (44) Labour (44) Other parties (11) People's Alliance (6) Nottingham Ind. (3) Green (1) Independent (1)
- Length of term: 4 years

Elections
- Voting system: First past the post
- Last election: 4 May 2023
- Next election: 6 May 2027

Meeting place
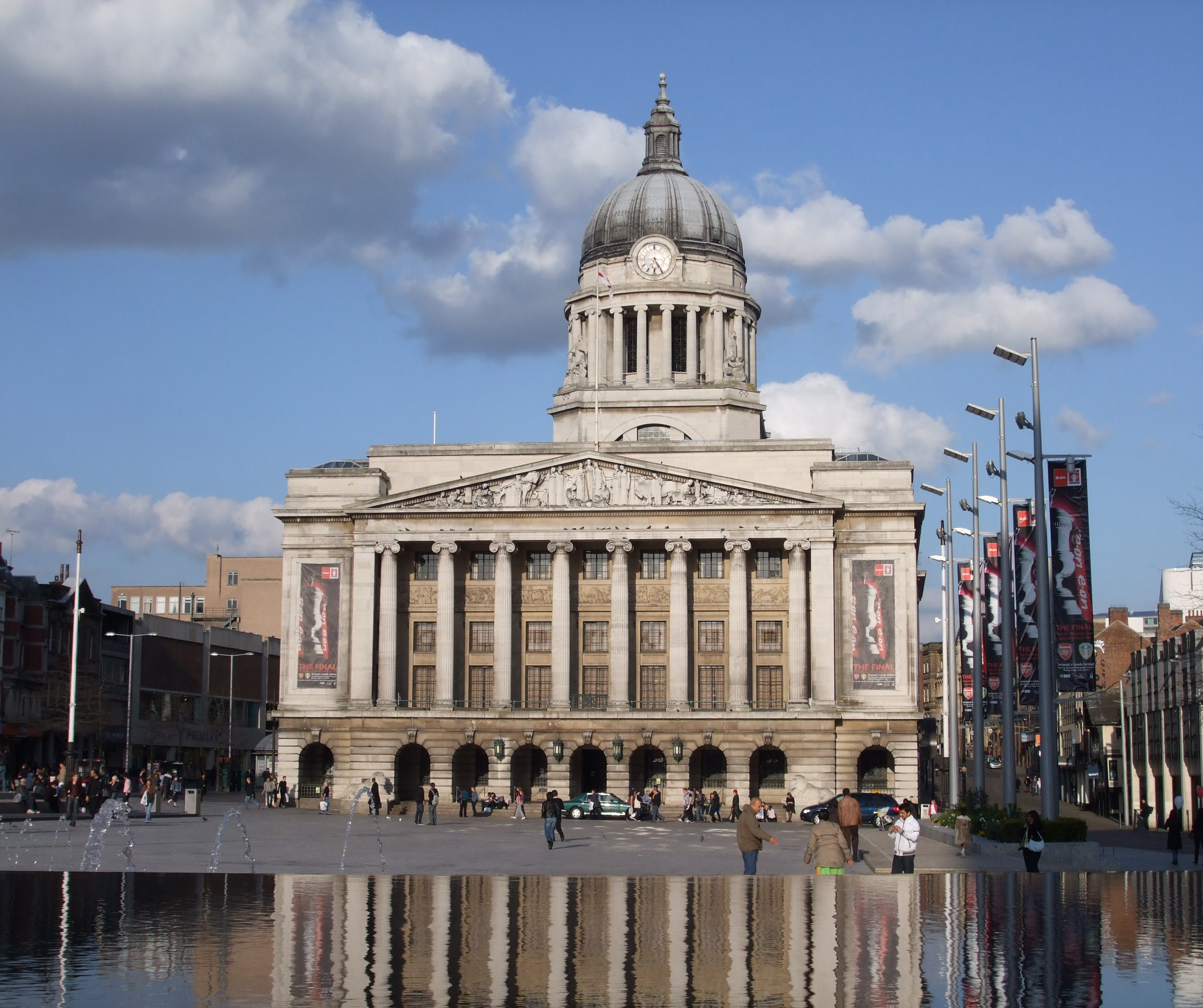
- Council House, Old Market Square, Nottingham, NG1 2DT

Website
- www.nottinghamcity.gov.uk

Nottingham City Council is the local authority for the city of Nottingham, in the ceremonial county of Nottinghamshire in the East Midlands region of England. Nottingham has had a council from medieval times, which has been reformed on numerous occasions. Since 1998 the council has been a unitary authority, being a district council which also performs the functions of a county council. Since 2024 the council has been a member of the East Midlands Combined County Authority.

The council has been under Labour majority control since 1991. The council meets at Nottingham Council House and has its main offices at Loxley House.

== History ==
Nottingham was an ancient borough. The earliest known borough charter was issued by Henry II sometime between 1155 and 1165; that charter did not purport to create the borough, but instead confirmed to it the rights that it had already held in the time of Henry I (reigned 1100–1135). The borough was governed by a corporation, also known as the town council. A later charter of 1284 granted the borough the right to appoint a mayor. In 1449 the corporation was given the right to appoint its own sheriffs, making Nottingham a county corporate, judicially independent from the rest of Nottinghamshire.

In 1836 Nottingham became a municipal borough under the Municipal Corporations Act 1835. When elected county councils were established in 1889 under the Local Government Act 1888, Nottingham was considered large enough to provide its own county-level services and so it was made a county borough, independent from Nottinghamshire County Council.

Nottingham was awarded city status on 7 August 1897, allowing the corporation to call itself Nottingham City Council. In 1928 the city council was given the right to appoint a lord mayor.

In 1974 Nottingham became a non-metropolitan district under the Local Government Act 1972, becoming a lower tier authority with Nottinghamshire County Council providing county-level services in the city for the first time. The city kept the same outer boundaries, but did gain an exclave from Nottinghamshire containing the Shire Hall. Nottingham kept its borough and city statuses and its lord mayoralty.

In 1998, Nottingham City Council regained responsibility for county-level services from Nottinghamshire County Council. The way this change was implemented was to create a new non-metropolitan county of Nottingham covering the same area as the existing district, but with no separate county council; instead the existing city council took on county functions, making it a unitary authority. This therefore restored the city council to the powers it had held when Nottingham was a county borough prior to 1974. Despite having been removed from the non-metropolitan county of Nottinghamshire (the area administered by Nottinghamshire County Council), the city remains part of the wider ceremonial county of Nottinghamshire for the purposes of lieutenancy.

On 29 November 2023, the council declared itself effectively bankrupt, with a £23m overspend forecast for the 2023-24 financial year. This has been speculated to be mainly due to the Robin Hood Energy initiative, which was set up by the council in 2015 and was closed in 2020. Being unable to produce a balanced budget (as required by law), it issued a Section 114 notice which requires all expenditure to cease except for statutory duties.

In 2024 a combined authority was established covering Nottingham, Nottinghamshire, Derby and Derbyshire, called the East Midlands Combined County Authority. The combined authority is chaired by the directly elected Mayor of the East Midlands and oversees the delivery of certain strategic functions across the area.

== Governance ==
As a unitary authority, Nottingham City Council has the functions of a county council and district council combined. There are no civil parishes in Nottingham, which has been an unparished area since the reforms of 1974.

=== Political control ===
The council has been under Labour majority control since 1991.

Political control of the council since the 1974 reforms took effect has been as follows:

Non-metropolitan district

Party in control	Years
Labour	1974–1976
Conservative	1976–1979
Labour	1979–1987
Conservative	1987–1988
No overall control	1988–1991
Labour	1991–1998

Unitary authority

Party in control	Years
Labour	1998–present

=== Political leadership ===
The role of Lord Mayor of Nottingham is largely ceremonial. Political leadership is instead provided by the leader of the council. The leaders since 1974 have been:

Councillor	Party	From	To
John Carroll	Labour	1974	May 1976
Jack Green	Conservative	May 1976	May 1979
John Carroll	Labour	May 1979	1981
Len Maynard	Labour	1981	May 1983
Betty Higgins	Labour	1983	May 1987
Bill Bradbury	Conservative	May 1987	Nov 1988
Betty Higgins	Labour	Nov 1988	May 1993
John Taylor	Labour	1993	May 1995
Graham Chapman	Labour	May 1995	May 2002
Brian Parbutt	Labour	3 May 2002	May 2003
Jon Collins	Labour	16 May 2003	May 2019
David Mellen	Labour	20 May 2019	20 May 2024
Neghat Khan	Labour	20 May 2024	

=== Political composition ===
Following the 2023 election, and subsequent by-elections and changes of allegiance up to August 2026, the composition of the council was:

Party	Seats
Labour	44
Nottingham People's Alliance	6
Nottingham Independents	3
Green	1
Independent	1
Total	55

The next election is due in 2027.

== Premises ==
Loxley House, the Council's main offices since 2009

Full Council meetings are held at Nottingham Council House in the Old Market Square in the city centre, which was completed in 1929 and is now a Grade II* listed building.

In 2009 the council moved its main offices to Loxley House, a modern office building on Station Street, opposite Nottingham railway station.

== Elections ==
Since the last boundary changes in 2019 the council has comprised 55 councillors representing 20 wards, with each ward electing two or three councillors. Elections are held every four years.

=== Wards ===
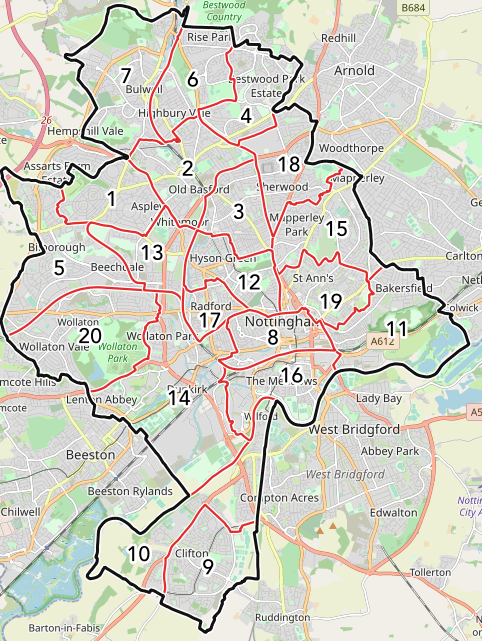
Map of the electoral wards of Nottingham

The wards are:

Map No.	Ward	Councillors
1	Aspley	3
2	Basford	3
3	Berridge	3
4	Bestwood	3
5	Bilborough	3
6	Bulwell Forest	3
7	Bulwell	3
8	Castle	2
9	Clifton East	3
10	Clifton West	2
11	Dales	3
12	Hyson Green & Arboretum	3
13	Leen Valley	2
14	Lenton & Wollaton East	3
15	Mapperley	3
16	Meadows	2
17	Radford	2
18	Sherwood	3
19	St. Ann's	3
20	Wollaton West	3

== Arms ==
Coat of arms of Nottingham City Council
Crest On a wreath of the colours a castle walled triple-towered and capped Proper the dexter tower surmounted of a crescent Argent and the sinister tower by an estoile Or (granted 10 June 1898). Escutcheon Gules issuant from the base a ragged cross couped Proper between two ducal coronets in chief Or the lower limb of the cross enfiled with a like coronet (recorded at the 1614 visitation). Supporters On either side standing on a staff raguly erased a royal stag guardant Proper ducally gorged Or (granted 3 November 1908). Motto Vivit Post Funera Virtus (Virtue Survives Death) Badge A saltire raguly Vert ensigned by a stag's head caboshed Proper (granted 7 November 1911).
