= A Biographical Dictionary of the Celebrated Women of Every Age and Country =

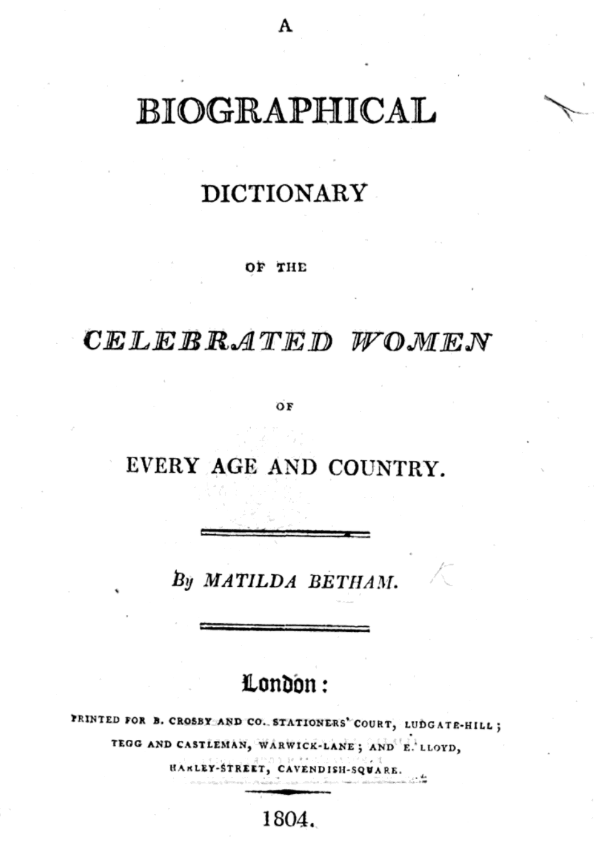
A Biographical Dictionary of the Celebrated Women of Every Age and Country

A Biographical Dictionary of the Celebrated Women of Every Age and Country is a large book created by Mary Matilda Betham and published in 1804. It included short biographies of Mary Magdalene, Cleopatra, Madame Roland, and other notable historical women from around the world.

The book was said to have taken Betham six years to compile. Some believe it to be the first of its kind although similar works pre-date it. In fact Betham notes that she shelved her project when she read that another was being compiled. However Betham saw the competitor's work and decided it was "a selection of historical extracts." Betham's work is novel because it includes contemporary women and some who were not well regarded.

Betham chose a large variety of celebrated women and, in one case (mistakenly), a man (Kresilas). The lasting importance of Betham's work can be seen, in that, her error was repeated by a later work... which blamed Betham for the mistake. Betham used authoritative sources although she sometimes added her own interpretation.

In 1948, nearly 150 years after it was published, American biographer Katharine Anthony wrote that Betham's "compendious Biographical Dictionary...still survives as an evidence of the author's phenomenal industry and of the strong public interest in women's achievements."

== Contents ==
A Biographical Dictionary of the Celebrated Women of Every Age and Country
Mary
Blanche of Castile
Cleopatra
Marie de France
Héloïse d’Argenteuil
Elizabeth I of England
Joan of Arc
Émilie du Châtelet
Hypatia
Catherine I of Russia
Sappho
Sarah Churchill, Duchess of Marlborough
Andromache
Marie-Jeanne L'Héritier
Catherine II of Russia
Emma of Normandy
Isabella I of Castile
Marie Antoinette
Christina of Sweden
Élisabeth Jacquet de La Guerre
Maria Sibylla Merian
Mary Magdalene
Maria Cunitz
Hildegard of Bingen
Caroline of Ansbach
Katharina von Bora
Anne Boleyn
Caterina Sforza
Mary I of England
Élisabeth Sophie Chéron
Barbara Uthmann
Mary Wollstonecraft
Semiramis
Lady Godiva
Diane de France, Duchess of Angoulême
Saint Afra
Uta of Schauenburg
Marie Huber
Anna Waser
Juliana Berners
Mary, Queen of Scots
Catherine de' Medici
Maria Theresa of Austria
Empress Matilda
Anne of Austria
Isabeau of Bavaria
Agrippina the Younger
Margaret of Austria, Duchess of Savoy
Queen of Sheba
Anna I of Russia
Lady Jane Grey
Catherine of Aragon
Helena Augusta
Costanza I of Sicily
Teresa of Ávila
Eleanor of Aquitaine
Anna Komnene
Catherine of Alexandria
Sor Juana Inés de la Cruz
Boudica
Madame de Pompadour
Zenobia
Margaret of Valois-Angoulême
Saint Barbara
Catherine Parr
Maria Gaetana Agnesi
Agatha of Sicily
Anne of Brittany
Margaret I of Denmark
Bridget of Sweden
Irene of Athens
Agnes of Rome
Artemisia Gentileschi
Deborah
Zoe Karbonopsina
Margaret of Valois
Aspasia
Isabella of France
Joan I of Navarre
Catherine of Siena
Margaret Beaufort
Julia Domna
Philippa of Hainault
Jeanne d'Albret
Aelia Eudocia
Adèle of Champagne
Agrippina the Elder
Octavia the Younger
Messalina
La Malinche
Saint Margaret of Scotland
Brunhilda of Austrasia
Madame de Maintenon
Madame du Barry
Nitocris
Fredegund
Madame de Montespan
Marozia
Margaret of Anjou
Julia Maesa
Anne Marie Louise d'Orléans
Agnès Sorel
Artemisia II of Caria
Aphra Behn
Pulcheria
Louise de La Vallière
Artemisia I of Caria
Clotilde
Saint Apollonia
Phryne
Anne of France
Empress Jingū
Anastasia of Sirmium
Fulvia
Louise of Savoy
Genmei
Constance, duchess of Brittany
Rachel Ruysch
Cornelia
Galeria Valeria
Monica of Hippo
Christine de Pizan
Julia Avita Mamaea
Jeanne-Marie Bouvier de La Motte Guyon
Mary Wortley Montagu
Æthelflæd
Genshō
Joanna I of Naples
Theano
Alys, Countess of the Vexin
Hipparchia of Maroneia
Margaret of France, Duchess of Berry
Renee of France
Genevieve
Sofonisba Anguissola
Lavinia Fontana
Manon Roland
Julian of Norwich
Ninon de Lenclos
Madame de Lafayette
Madeleine de Scudéry
Louise Labé
Madame de Sévigné
Adrienne Lecouvreur
Rosalba Carriera
Balthild
Paula of Rome
Parysatis
Bertha of Kent
Macrina the Younger
Catherine of Genoa
Anyte of Tegea
Corinna
Sophonisba
Anne Bradstreet
Locusta
Margaret Cavendish, Duchess of Newcastle-upon-Tyne
Jane Neville
Margaret Stewart, Dauphine of France
Anna Maria van Schurman
Vittoria Colonna
Engelberga
Porcia
Hürrem Sultan
Erinna
Anne-Geneviève de Bourbon
Hilda
Bianca Cappello
Madame d'Aulnoy
Galeria Fundana
Hortense Mancini
Arete of Cyrene
Kassia
Salome Alexandra
Mariamne
Bertrada of Laon
Cynisca
Saint Marcella
Eadgifu of Wessex
Catarina van Hemessen
Marie Thérèse Rodet Geoffrin
Phila
Laura de Noves
Antoinette Bourignon
Elisabetta Sirani
Rosamund Clifford
Françoise d'Amboise
Agnes of Austria
Anna Bijns
Anne Dacier
Countess Amalie Elisabeth of Hanau-Münzenberg
Olympia Fulvia Morata
Alpaïs of Cudot
Tarquinia Molza
Isotta Nogarola
Mary of Jesus of Ágreda
Diane de Poitiers
Praxilla
Telesilla
Joanna of Flanders
Leonora Dori
Sosipatra
Maria van Oosterwijck
Properzia de' Rossi
Delarivier Manley
Abbasa
Acca Larentia
Amalasuntha
Nitocris of Babylon
Queen Marcia
Agallis
Matilda of Flanders
Laura Battiferri
Timycha
Aryenis
Claudine Guérin de Tencin
Elizabeth of Schönau
Arbella Stuart
Lamia of Athens
Marie Angélique Arnauld
Madeleine de Puisieux
Lais of Corinth
Arria
Eustochium
Cassandra Fedele
Elizabeth Montagu
Tullia d'Aragona
Mavia
Alexandra the Maccabee
Marie Dentière
Anne Askew
Françoise de Graffigny
Elizabeth Barton
Marie Guyart
Dhuoda
Eirene
Cresilas
Pernette Du Guillet
Madeleine Françoise Basseporte
Amage
Kitty Clive
Blandina
Catherine of Bologna
Anacaona
Moderata Fonte
Anne-Thérèse de Marguenat de Courcelles
Blaesilla
Matilda of Tuscany
Marie-Catherine de Villedieu
Marie Anne Barbier
Lucia Anguissola
Jeanne Marie Leprince de Beaumont
Elena Cornaro Piscopia
Jeanne Hachette
Louise Marguerite of Lorraine
Sarah Fielding
Thargelia
Chand Bibi
Mary Sidney
Marie de Gournay
Anna Louisa Karsch
Livia
Hortensia
Jane Shore
Gabrielle-Suzanne de Villeneuve
Antoinette du Ligier de la Garde Deshoulières
Anne Bacon
Peg Woffington
Mary Delany
Ageltrude
Margaret Roper
Ginevra Cantofoli
Anne Finch, Countess of Winchilsea
Françoise de Cezelli
Mary Darby Robinson
Catherine Bernard
Anne-Marguerite Petit du Noyer
Iaia
Timarete
Catharine Macaulay
Nur Jahan
Laura Bassi
Moero
Marietta Robusti
Leaena
Sulpicia
Anna Maria Anguissola
Anne Halkett
Faltonia Betitia Proba
Antiope
Huldah
Chiara Matraini
Marie-Thérèse Reboul
Aristarete
Carmenta
Madeleine Des Roches
Jezebel
Frances Brooke
Esther
Maria Pita
Cumaean Sibyl
Eve
Jeanne de Clisson
Dido
Susanna Centlivre
Khawla al-Hanafiyya
Catharine Trotter
Eleanor, Fair Maid of Brittany
Julie d'Angennes
Chiara Varotari
Alessandra Scala
Diotima of Mantinea
Cornificia
Lombarda
Gudit
Elizabeth Griffith
Manto
Hippe
Europa Anguissola
Sybilla of Conversano
Margaret Clement
Eliza Haywood
Henriette Wolters-van Pee
Susannah Maria Cibber
Claude Catherine de Clermont
Beatriz Galindo
Calypso
Anna
Hester Chapone
Marie d'Orléans-Longueville
Lucrezia Marinella
Lady Carcas
Margaretha van Godewijk
Charlotte of Albret
Ketevan the Martyr
Arignote
Pantea Arteshbod
Katherine Philips
Giulia Gonzaga
Damaris Cudworth Masham
Novella d'Andrea
Mary Beale
Mary Astell
Marquise de Caylus
Catherine Descartes
Louise-Marie de Lanternât
Françoise Bertaut de Motteville
Leontion
Almucs de Castelnau
Maria Verelst
Alan Gua
Elizabeth Jane Weston
Jeanne Dumée
Selina Hastings, Countess of Huntingdon
Dorotea Bucca
Leonora Baroni
Isabella Andreini
Helena of Adiabene
Jacqueline de Longwy
María Pacheco
Giovanna d'Aragona
Anaxandra
Aniella di Beltrano
Anne-Louise Élie de Beaumont
Anne-Marie Bigot de Cornuel
Anne-Marie du Boccage
Anne de La Vigne
Anne de La Roche-Guilhem
Anne de Marquets
Antoinette de Loynes
Antoinette de Saliès
Chilonis
Camma
Catherine Des Roches
Catherine Durand
Catherine Duchemin
Catherine de Parthenay
Charlotte-Catherine Patin
Charlotte-Rose de Caumont La Force
Clorinda Renieri
Clémence Isaure
Phemonoe
Diana Scultori
Wallada bint al-Mustakfi
Elizabeth Rowe
Fannia
Luisa Sigea de Velasco
Françoise-Albine Benoist
Marie Jeanne Riccoboni
Gabrielle-Charlotte Patin
Gabrielle Suchon
George Anne Bellamy
Georgette de Montenay
Henriette-Julie de Murat
Henriette de Coligny de La Suze
Irene di Spilimbergo
Jeanne-Michelle de Pringy
Louise-Geneviève Gillot de Saintonge
Lubna of Cordoba
Marie de Miramion
Madeleine Angélique Poisson Gomez
Madeleine Boullogne
Madeleine Patin
Marguerite de Lubert
Marguerite de Lussan
Marguerite de Launay, baronne de Staal
Marie-Anne de Roumier-Robert
Marie-Louise-Charlotte de Pelard de Givry de Fontaines
Marie Madeleine de Rochechouart de Mortemart
Marie Anne Victoire Pigeon
Marie Bruneau des Loges
Marie Marguerite Bihéron
Marie Dupré
Marie Gigault de Bellefonds
Marie Prudence Plisson
Myrtis of Anthedon
Octavie Guichard
Oliva Sabuco
Pamphile of Epidaurus
Philis de La Charce
Blanche Parry
Teresa del Po
Violante Beatrice Siries
Élisabeth Guibert
Aloara
Androcleia
Blanche Arundell
Bona Lombarda
Margaret Seymour
Jane Seymour
Costanza d'Avalos Piccolomini
Æbbe of Coldingham
Laura Cereta
Lucrezia Gonzaga
Margherita Costa
Margherita Sarrocchi
Maria Maddalena Morelli
Maria Oriana Galli da Bibbiena
Bettina d'Andrea
Agnes Randolph
Aisha bint Ahmad al-Qurtubiyya
Aisha
Alrude Countess of Bertinoro
Amaesia Sentia
Ann Baynard
Anna, Lady Miller
Anne Killigrew
Anne Oldfield
Anne Wharton
Antonia Pinelli
Gunhilde
Battista Malatesta
Baudonivia
Juliana Morell
Bettisia Gozzadini
Birgitte Thott
Plautilla Bricci
Anne Clifford
Fritigil
Vendela Skytte
Caterina Tarabotti
Catherina Boevey
Catherine Talbot
Charlotte Brooke
Lucia Casalini Torelli
Claude de Bectoz
Claudia Rufina
Claudine Bouzonnet-Stella
Constantia Grierson
Dorothy, Lady Pakington
Elizabeth, Lady Wardlaw
Elizabeth Bland
Elizabeth Bury
Elizabeth Elstob
Elizabeth Hoby
Elizabeth Lucar
Elizabeth Ryves
Elizabeth Thomas
Elizabeth Tollet
Elspeth Buchan
Esther Inglis
Frances Norton, Lady Norton
Frances Sheridan
Ana de Castro Egas
Ana Caro de Mallén
Devorà Ascarelli
Isabella Parasole
Jane Lumley
Juffrouw Rozée
Katherine Jones, Viscountess Ranelagh
Elizabeth Hastings
Mary Chudleigh
Laetitia Pilkington
Madeleine de l’Aubespine
Potamiana
Mary Chandler
Mary Monck
Rachel Russell, Baroness Russell
Thoma
Winifred Maxwell, Countess of Nithsdale
Matilde Bentivoglio
Biblis
Caterina Cantoni
Roberta Carafa
Ana Cervatón
Damophila
Adélaïde d'Espinassy
Philiberte de Fleurs
Olimpia Malipiero
Mademoiselle Chabot de Marchebrusc
Maroula of Lemnos
Anna Metrana
Perilla
Marie-Thérèse Potar Dulu
Lucretia Régnier
Angelica Regnier
Anna Regnier
Agnès du Rochier
Thymele
Hannah Pritchard
Maddalena Aceiaiuoli
Argentaria Polla
Senana ferch Caradog
Geneviève Boullogne
Mildred Cooke
Charlotte Bourette
Jeanne de Montégut-Ségla
Mary Leapor
Rhodopis
Cambra
Marseille d'Altouvitis
Marie de Louvencourt
Mme de Beaumer
Maria Alphaizuli
Mary Arundell
Catharina Burea
Aspasia the Younger
Isabel de Josa
Megalostrata
Theano
Bernarda Ferreira de Lacerda
Clémence de Bourges
Jacqueline Bouette de Blémur
Jeanne Gaillarde
Capillana
Elizabeth Walker
Susanna Hopton
Eleanor Davies
Mary Fisher
Kora of Sicyon
Helena of Egypt
Francisca de Lebrija
Elizabeth Burnet
Grace Gethin
Catherine Killigrew
Perpetua
Elizabeth Clinton, Countess of Lincoln
Sarah Pennington
Elizabeth Fane
Anne de Graville
Marianne-Agnès Falques
Lucrezia Quistelli
Susanna Mayr
Laura Guidiccioni
Lorenza Strozzi
Renée du Bec-Crespin
Mary Basset
Claire-Marie Mazarelli de Saint-Chamond
Anna Felicitas Neuberger
Priscilla
Isabella Discalzi Mazzoni
Elizabeth Dauncey
Louise de Ballon
Judith
Lucretia
Marguerite de Foix-Candale
Gertruida van Veen
Gabrielle de Bourbon
María de la Antigua
Jacquette Guillaume
Marie de Saint-Aubin
Jeanne de Cambry
Elpis
Cornelia Adrichomia
Charlotte Saumaise de Chazan
Suzanne Habert
Jeanne de Schomberg Liancourt
Marie Angelique Anel Le Rebours
Marie-Priscille de Catellan
Lucia Scaligeri
Anne de Deyster
Marguerite de Cambis
Lucia Bertana
Maria Elena Panzacchi
Anne Clarges
Anne de Seguier
Charixene
Isabella Sforza
Anne-Eléonore de Béthune d'Orval
Marie-Eléonore de Rohan
Charlotte-Marie-Anne Charbonnier de La Guesnerie
Charlotte de Melson
Marie-Madeleine d'Aguesseau
Madame Bontems
Sitti Maani Gioerida della Valle
Margaret of Attenduli
Anne de Parthenay
Françoise Masquière
Mademoiselle de Bermann
Jacqueline Aimée Brohon
Barbara Burrini
Marie Héricart
Damigella Trivulzio
Margaret Lambrun
Minerva Bartoli
Anna Smijters
Angela Veronica Airola
Elizabeth Legge
Athyrte
