= List of women in Female Biography =

Female biography was identified and named by Mary Hays (1759–1843) as a discrete empirical category of knowledge production and analysis while researching figures for the first Enlightenment prosopography of women, Female Biography; Or, memoirs of Illustrious and Celebrated Women, of all Ages and Countries (R. Phillips, 1803) in six volumes.

The first American edition came in 1807, arranged as three volumes and with minor typographical corrections (Birch & Small, Philadelphia). A new version of the encyclopedia was published again in six volumes in 2013 and 2014, as part of The Chawton House Library Series Memoirs of Women Writers (Part II: volumes 5–7; Part III, volumes 8–10; Pickering & Chatto, London). The Chawton House Library Edition (or CHLE) was edited by Gina Luria Walker, produced by a collaborative of contemporary scholars representing over 100 institutions in 18 countries and four continents, and contains new annotations and research that contextualize Hays's original sources of information.

This list of women collects all 300 figures included in Female Biography. Approximately 100 of the subjects listed here were also included in Judy Chicago's 1979 art installation The Dinner Party, either with a place setting at the table or with a ceramic tile in the Heritage Floor.

The names in the list below appear as they were spelled and alphabetized by Hays for the original publication. Hays grouped some subjects together in a single entry (resulting in a total count of 294 entries, but 300 subjects), indicated below with asterisks, all of which have been separately identified by scholars working on the modern edition.

Name	Image	Dates	Origin	Notes	1803 Vol.	CHLE Vol.
Abbasa (confused with her sister, Ulayya)		8th-9th century	Arab	Abbasid princess and poet	1	5
Adricomia (Cornelia Adrichomia)		16th century	Dutch	Nun, Poet	1	5
Agnes Sorrel, or Sorreille	Jean Fouquet's Madonna Surrounded by Seraphim and Cherubim (modeled on Agnès Sorel)	1422–1450	French	Mistress to King Charles VII of France	1	5
Agreda, Mary de	María de Jesús de Agreda	1602–1665	Spanish	Ecstatic Nun, Mystic	1	5
Agrippina the Elder	Agrippina the Elder (in the Museo Arqueológico Nacional)	d.33 CE	Roman	Roman Noblewoman	1	5
Agrippina the Younger		15-59	Roman	Roman Empress	1	5
Albert, Jane, d’ (Jeanne d'Albret)		1528-1572	French	Queen, writer, poet, French Huguenot protectoress	1	5
Aldrude, Countess of Bertinoro		12th century	Italian	Countess, Led troops to battle	1	5
Aloysia Sigea, of Toledo (Luisa)		1522–1560	Spanish	Poet, Major figure of Spanish Humanism	1	5
Amalasenta		495-535	Ostrogoth	Ostrogoth Princess, Queen Regent	1	5
Amboise, Frances d’		1427-1485	French	Carmelite nun	1	5
Ammannati, Laura Battiferri		1523–1589	Italian	Poet	1	5
Andreini, Isabella	Isabella Andreini	1562–1604	Italian	Actress, Writer	1	5
Anjou, Margaret of		1430–1482	French	Royal consort	1	5
Anne of Austria		1601–1666	Spanish	Princess	1	5
Anne of Beaujeu		1461–1522	French	Princess and Regent	1	5
Anne of Bretagne		1477–1514	French	Queen, patron of the arts	1	5
Anonymous: Bettina d'Andrea*		1311–1355	Italian	Professor of Law and Philosophy	3	7
Anonymous: Bettisia Gozzadini*		1209–1260	Italian	Professor of Law	3	7
Anonymous: Dorotea Bocchi*		1360–1436	Italian	Physician	3	7
Anonymous: Laura Bassi*		1711–1778	Italian	Professor of Anatomy, Philosophy and Experimental Physics	3	7
Anonymous: Maddalena Bonsignori*		14th century	Italian	Professor of Law	3	7
Anonymous: Novella d'Andrea*		14th century	Italian	Professor of Law	3	7
Antonia		36 BCE – 37 CE	Roman	Roman Noblewoman	1	5
Aragon, Isabella of		1470–1524	Neapolitan	Princess	1	5
Aragon, Joan of (Giovanna d'Aragona)		1502–1575	Neapolitan	Noblewoman	1	5
Aragon, Tullia of		d.1556	Italian	Courtesan, writer, philosopher	1	5
Arc, Joan d', Maid of Orleans		d.1431	French	Soldier	1	5
Aretaphila		2nd century BCE	Greek	Cyrenean Noblewoman	1	5
Arete (of Cyrene)		4th century BCE	Greek	Philosopher	1	5
Argentaria, Polla		1st century	Roman	Roman Noblewoman	1	5
Armyne, Lady Mary		d.1676	English	Benefactress	1	5
Arnaude de Rocas		d.1570	Greek	Martyr	1	5
Arnauld, Angelique (Angélique de Saint-Jean Arnauld d'Andilly)		1624–1684	French	Nun, writer	1	5
Arnauld, Catherine Agnes (Jeanne-Catherine-Agnès Arnauld)		1593–1672	French	Abbess	1	5
Arnauld, Mary Angelique (Jacqueline-Marie-Angélique Arnauld)		1591–1661	French	Abbess	1	5
Arria		1st century CE	Roman	Roman Noblewoman	1	5
Artemisia Gentileschi		1593–c.1656	Italian	Painter	1	5
Artemesia I		5th century BCE	Greek	Carian Queen	1	5
Artemesia wife of Mausolus (Artemisia II of Caria)		d.351 BCE	Greek	Carian Queen	1	5
Arundel, Mary Countess of		d.1557	English	Translations	1	5
Arundell, Blanche Lady		d.1649	English	Defended Wardour Castle	1	5
Ascham, Margaret		16th century	English	Writer	1	5
Askew, Anne		1521–1546	English	Poet, Protestant Martyr	1	5
Aspasia		5th century BCE	Greek	Courtesan, Intellectual	1	5
Aspasia or Milto		5th century BCE	Greek	Mistress of Cyrus	1	5
Astell, Mary		1666–1731	English	Writer	1	5
Athenais		d.460	Greek	Empress	1	5
Aubespine, Madeleine de l’		1546–1596	French	Poet, translations	1	5
Bacon, Lady (Ann)		d.1610	English	Translations	1	5
Barbier, Mary Anne		d.1745	French	Writer, playwright, poet	1	5
Baroni, Leonora		1611–1670	Italian	Singer, musician, composer	1	5
Basine, or Bazine		5th century	German	Queen	1	5
Bavaria, Isabella of		1370–1435	Bavarian / French	Queen consort	1	5
Baynard, Anne		1672–1697	English	Natural Philosopher	1	5
Beale, Mary		1632–1697	English	Painter	1	5
Beaufort, Joan, Queen of Scotland		d.1445	English	Queen Consort	1	5
Beaufort, Margaret		1443–1509	English	Mother of King Henry VII, Benefactress	1	5
Bectoz, Claude de		1490–1547	French	Abbess, poet	1	5
Behn, Aphra	Aphra Behn	1640–1689	English	Writer, playwright, poet	1	5
Bendish, Bridget		1650–1726	English	Granddaughter to Oliver Cromwell	1	5
Berenice (daughter of Herod of Agrippa)		1st century CE	Judean	Judean princess	1	5
Bernard, Catherine		1663–1712	French	Writer, playwright, poet	1	5
Berners or Barnes, Juliana		14th-15th century	English	Abbess, writer	1	5
Berneuille, Maria Catherina le Jumel de, Countess d'Aulnoy		d.1705	French	Writer	1	5
Bertaut, Frances (Françoise), Madame de Motteville		d.1689	French	Memoir writer	1	5
Blanche of Castile		1188-1252	Spanish	Queen, Regent	1	5
Bland, Elizabeth		17th–18th century	English	Hebrew Scholar	2	6
Boadicea (Boudica), Queen of the Britons		1st century	Britons	Queen	2	6
Bohemia, Elizabeth Frederica of		1618–1680	German	Philosopher	1	5
Boleyn, Anne		d.1536	English	Queen, poet	2	6
Bontems, Madame (Marie-Jeanne de Châtillon Bontemps)		1718–1768	French	Translator	2	6
Bourbon, Henrietta of (Anne Marie Louise d'Orléans, Duchess of Montpensier)		1627–1693	French	Princess, memoirist	1	5
Bourges, Clemence de		16th century	French	Poet, musician	2	6
Bourignon, Antoinette		1616–1680	Flemish	Mystic, writer, printer	2	6
Bovey, Catherine		1669–1726	English	Benefactress	2	6
Bregy, Countess of (Charlotte Saumaise de Chasan)		1619–1684	French	Noblewoman	2	6
Broadstreet (Bradstreet), Anne		1612–1672	English	Poet	2	6
Marie Bruneau des Loges		1584–1641	French	Noblewoman, salonniere	1	
Burleigh, Lady Mildred		1526–1589	English	Writer, translator	2	6
Burnet, Elizabeth		1661–1709	English	Writer, benefactress	2	6
Bury, Elizabeth		1644-1720	English	Diarist	2	6
Calphurnia (Calpurnia)		1st century	Roman	Wife of Pliny (the Younger)	2	6
Calpurnia		1st century BCE	Roman	Final wife of Julius Caesar	2	6
Capello, Bianca		1548–1587	Italian	Noblewoman	2	6
Carew, Lady Elizabeth		d.1546	English	Writer	3	7
Carolina, wife to George II (Caroline of Ansbach)		1683–1737	German	Queen consort	2	6
Catherine I of Russia		1684–1727	Swedish	Queen	2	6
Catherine II of Russia (Catherine the Great)		1729–1796	German	Queen, writer	2	6 & 7
Catherine of Aragon		1485–1536	Spanish	Queen, Regent	2	6
Catherine of Medicis		1519–1589	Italian	Queen consort, patron of the arts	2	6
Centrelivre, Susannah		d.1723	English	Poet, actress, dramatist	3	7
Chandler, Mary		1687–1745	English	Poet	3	7
Chapone, Mrs. (Hester)		1727–1801	English	Writer	3	7
Charixena		6th century BCE	Greek	Writer, poet	3	7
Chatelet, Marchioness de (Émilie)		1706–1749	French	Writer, mathematician, physicist	2	
Chelonis, wife of Cleombrotus II		3rd century BCE	Greek	Queen	3	7
Christina, Queen of Sweden		1626–1689	Swedish	Queen	3	7
Chudleigh, Lady Mary		1656–1710	English	Writer, poet	3	7
Cibber, Susannah Maria		1714–1766	English	Singer, actress	3	7
Clemente, Margaret		1508–1570	English	Learned woman, niece of Thomas More	3	7
Cleobule (Cleobuline), daughter of Cleobulus		6th century BCE	Greek	Known for her verse riddles	3	7
Cleopatra		d.30 BCE	Egyptian	Queen, writer	3	7
Clifford, Anne, Countess of Pembroke, Dorset and Montgomery		1590–1676	English	Noblewoman, diarist	3	7
Clive, Catherine		1711–1785	English	Actress	3	7
Cockburn, Catherine		1679–1749	English	Novelist, dramatist, philosopher	3	7
Colonne, Victoire, Marchioness de Pescaire (Vittoria Colonna)		1492–1547	Italian	Noblewoman, poet	3	7
Comnena, Anna		1083-1153	Greek	Byzantine princess, scholar, historian	3	7
Cordaud, Isabella de (Isabella Losa of Cordova)		1490-1564	Catalan	Scholar, Jesuit patron	3	7
Cordey, Charlotte		1768–1793	French	Assassin of Jean-Paul Marat	3	7
Corinna		5th century BCE	Greek	Poet, teacher	3	7
Cornaro, Helena Lucretia		1646–1684	Italian	Mathematician, Doctor of Philosophy	3	7
Cornelia, mother of the Gracchi		2nd century BCE	Roman	Roman noblewoman	3	7
Cromwell, Elizabeth		1598–1665	English	Wife of Oliver Cromwell	3	7
Cruz, Juana Inez de la		1651–1695	Mexican (New Spain)	Scholar, poet, nun	3	7
Cynisca		5th century BCE	Greek	Spartan princess, first woman to win at the Olympic games	3	7
Dacier, Madame		d.1720	French	Scholar, translator	4	8
Damophila (Damophyla), wife of Damophilus		7th century BCE	Greek	Poet, contemporary of Sappho	4	8
Dancy, Elizabeth		1506-1564	English	Daughter of Thomas More, scholar	4	8
Dante, Theodora (Teodora Danti)		16th century	Italian	Mathematician, artist	4	8
Darbach or Karsch, Louisa	Portrait of Anna Louisa Karsch	1722–1791	Silesian (German-language)	Poet	4	8
Davies, Lady Eleanor		1590–1652	English	Prophet, author	4	8
Derby, Countess of	Charlotte Stanley, Countess of Derby	1599–1664	English	English noblewoman	4	8
Desmond, Countess of (Katherine Fitzgerald)	Engraving of Katherine, Countess of Desmond	d.1604	Irish	Noblewoman	4	8
Dido, Queen of Carthage		9th century BCE	Phoenician (modern-day Lebanon)	Queen	4	8
Diotyma		5th century BCE	Greek	Priestess, philosopher	4	8
Drusilla, Livia	Livia Drusilla	59 BCE–29 CE	Roman	Roman empress	4	8
Dubois, Dorothea		1728–1774	English	Novelist, playwright	4	8
Marie Dupré		1650-1700	French	Scholar, author, poet	4	8
Ebba, Abbess of Coldingham		d.870	English	Abbess	4	8
Edesie, wife of Hermias		5th century	Roman	Philosopher	4	8
Egeé		13th century BCE	North African	Libyan Queen, Amazon warrior	4	8
Eleanor of Aquitaine, wife of Louis VII of France, and Henry II of England	Seal of Eleanor of Aquitaine	d.1204	French	Queen consort, patron of literary figures	4	8
Elizabeth, Queen of England		1533–1603	English	Queen, writer, translator	4	8
Elizabeth of France, Queen of Spain		1546–1568	French	Queen consort	4	8
Elstob, Elizabeth		1683–1756	English	Scholar, author, translations	4	8
Enclos, Ninon de l'		1620–1705	French	Author, courtesan, patron of the arts	4	8
Emma, Queen of England		d.1052	Norman	Queen consort	4	8
Eponina (or Epponina)		1st century	Roman	Roman matron (wife of Julius Sabinus)	4	8
Erinna		4th century BCE	Greek	Poet	4	8
Estrada, Maria d’		15th-16th century	Spanish	Warrior	4	8
Ethelfleda, Queen of Mercia		d.918	English	Queen	4	8
Eurydice		5th-4th century BCE	Illyrian	Queen, scholar	6	8
Eusebia, wife of Constance		4th century	Roman	Roman matron	4	8
Falconberg, Lady daughter of Oliver Cromwell		1637–1713	English	daughter of Oliver Cromwell	4	8
Fane, Lady Elizabeth		d.1568	English	Author	4	8
Fannia (daughter of Paetus Thrasea)		1st century	Roman	Roman political rebel	4	8
Fayette, Countess de la (Marie-Madeleine Pioche de la Vergne)		1634-1693	French	Author, novelist	4	8
Fidele, Cassandra		d.1558	Italian	Scholar, poet	4	8
Fielding, Sarah		1710–1768	English	Author, novelist	4	8
Finch, Anne, Countess of Winchelsea		1661–1720	English	Poet	4	8
Fischer, Mary		d.1698	English	Quaker zealot	4	8
Foix, Margaret de, Duchess D’Épernon (Marguerite de Foix-Candale)		1567-1593	French	Heiress	4	8
Fulvia, wife of Marc Antony		d.40 BCE	Roman	Roman aristocrat, populist leader	4	8
Galigai, Leonora		1568–1617	Italian	Alleged witch	4	8
Gethin, Lady Grace		1676–1697	English	Scholar, essayist	4	8
Gonzaga, Cecilia de		1426–1451	Italian	Scholar, noblewoman	4	8
Gonzaga, Eleonora		1493–1570	Italian	Governed Urbino during her husband's exile, patron	4	8
Gonzaga, Isabella de (Elisabetta Gonzaga)		1471–1526	Italian	Noblewoman, patron	4	8
Gonzaga, Julia		1513–1566	Italian	Noblewoman	4	8
Gonzaga, Lucretia		1522-1576	Italian	Noblewoman, writer, scholar	4	8
Gray, Lady Jane		d.1554	English	Queen of England for 9 days	4	8
Grierson, Constantia		d.1732	Irish	Scholar, poet, midwife	4	8
Guercheville, Madame de		1560-1632	French	Noblewoman, patron	4	8
Guillaume, Jacquette		17th century	French	Writer	4	8
Guillet, Pernette du		d.1545	French	Poet	4	8
Guyon, Madame (Jeanne-Marie Bouvier de la Motte-Guyon)		1648–1717	French	Mystic, writer	4	8
Haerin, Lucia (Lucy Russell, Countess of Bedford)		1581–1627	English	Patron of arts and literature	4	8
Halket, Lady Anna		d.1699	English	Writer, autobiographer	4	8
Harcourt, Harriet Eusebia		1705–1745	English	Nonexistent person, alleged to have established a Protestant nunnery in Richmond	4	8
Hardwick, Elizabeth, (Countess of Shrewsbury)		d.1608	English	Noblewoman, famous for her building projects	4	8
Hastings, Lady Elizabeth		1682–1739	English	Benefactress	4	8
Haywood, Elizabeth		d.1756	English	Writer, actress, publisher	4	8
Helena Flavia, mother of Constantine the Great		d.330	Roman	Mother of Emperor Constantine	4	8
Heloise		12th century	French	Writer, scholar, abbess	4	8
Helpes (Elpis, wife of Boethius)		5th-6th century	Roman	Learned woman	4	8
Heron, Cecily		16th century	English	Learned woman	4	8
Hersilia		8th century BCE	Roman	Wife of Romulus, mediator	4	8
Hildegurdis (Hildegard of Bingen)		d.1179	German	Christian mystic, abbess	4	8
Hipparchia		4th century BCE	Greek	Philosopher	4	8
Hopton, Susanna		1627–1709	English	Religious writer	4	8
Hortensia		1st century BCE	Roman	Orator	4	8
Houlieres, Antoinetta de la garde des		1638–1694	French	Scholar, philosopher, poet	4	8
Hyde, Ann		1637–1671	English	Writer	4	8
Hypatia		d.415	Greek	Mathematician, philosopher	4	8
Inglis, Esther		1571–1624	Scottish	Calligrapher, translator, writer	4	8
Isabella, Queen of Hungary		1519-1559	Polish	Queen consort	4	8
Jane, Queen of France		1338–1378	French	Queen consort to Charles V	4	8
Jardins, Mary Catherine de		1640–1683	French	Author, playwright	4	8
Jars, Mary de, Lady of Gournay		1565–1645	French	Author, editor	4	8
Julia Domna		d.217	Syrian	Roman Empress	4	8
Juliana, anchoret of Norwich		14th-15th century	English	Mystic, anchorite	4	8
Killigrew, Anne		1660-1685	English	Poet	4	8
Killigrew, Katherine		d.1583	English	Scholar	4	8
Labe, Louise		d.1566	French	Poet	4	8
Lambrun, Margaret		16th century	Scottish	Would-be assassin of Queen Elizabeth I	4	8
Landa, Catherine (Caterina Landi, Countess of Melzo)		d.1587	Italian	Learned woman, poet	4	8
Lane, Mrs. Jane		d.1689	English	Assisted in the escape of Charles II	4	8
Leapor, Mary		1722–1746	English	Poet	4	8
Legge, Elizabeth		1580–1685	English	Learned woman, poet	4	8
Leontium		4th century BCE	Greek	Philosopher	4	8
Elizabeth, Countess of Lincoln		d.1638	English	Writer	4	8
Lionna		6th century BCE	Greek	Greek heroine	4	8
Longvie, Jaquiline de, Duchess of Montpensier		d.1561	French	Noblewoman	4	8
Lucar, Elizabeth		1510–1537	English	Calligrapher	4	8
Lucretia		d.510 BCE	Roman	Roman matron	4	8
Lumley, Joanna Lady		1537–1578	English	Scholar, translator	4	8
Macaulay, Mrs.		1731–1791	English	Writer, historian	5	9
Maeroe		4th century BCE	Greek	Learned woman	5	9
Magdalene de St Nectaire		1526–1575	French	Protestant heroine of the French Wars of Religion	5	9
Maintenon, Madame de (Francoise d'Aubigne Madame Scarron)		1635–1719	French	Influential wife to King Louis XIV of France	5	9
Margaret de Valois, Queen of Navarre (Marguerite d'Angoulême)		1492–1549	French	Queen consort, author, patron	5	9
Maria (Mania)		5th century BCE	Anatolian	Satrap	5	9
Marinelli, Lucrezia		17th century	Italian	Writer	5	9
Mary, an Anglo-Norman Poetess		12th-13th century	French	Poet	5	9
Mary, Queen of Hungary		1505–1558	Flemish	Queen consort, governor of the Hapsburg Netherlands	5	9
Mary, Queen of Scots		1542–1587	Scottish	Queen	5	9
Masham, Damaris Lady		1659–1708	English	Philosopher	5	9
Matoaks or Matoaka		1585–1617	Algonquian	Native American, assisted Jamestown settlers	5	9
Moesa and Mammea – Julia Avita Mamaea		d.235	Syrian	Roman matron, daughter of Julia Moesa	5	9
Moesa and Mammea – Julia Moesa		3rd-4th century	Syrian	Roman politician, sister of Julia Domna	5	9
Molsa, Tarquinia		1542–1617	Italian	Singer, poet	5	9
Monk, The Honourable Mrs.		d.1715	Irish	Poet	5	9
Morata, Olympia Fulvia		1526–1555	Italian	Scholar	5	9
Mountfourt, Countess of		d.1374	French	Duchess of Brittany, war leader	5	9
Nemours, Dutchess of (Marie d'Orléans-Longueville)		1625–1707	French	Memoirist	5	9
Newcastle, Margaret Cavendish, Duchess of		1623–1673	English	Writer	5	9
North, The Honorable Mrs. Dudley		1675–1712	English	Scholar	5	9
Norton, Lady Frances		1644–1731	English	Writer, poet	5	9
Octavia, wife of Marc-Antony		d.11 BCE	Roman	Roman matron	6	10
Octavia, wife to Nero		d.62	Roman	Roman Empress	6	10
Oldfield, Mrs.		1683–1730	English	Actress	6	10
Padilla, Maria Pacheco		d.1531	Spanish	Spanish matron, warrior	6	10
Pakington, Dorothy Lady		1623–1679	English	Writer	6	10
Parthenai, Anne de		16th century	French	Learned woman	6	10
Parthenai, Catherine de		1554-1631	French	Poet	6	10
Paulina (wife of Seneca)		1st century	Roman	Intellectual	6	10
Perilla		1st century BCE	Roman	Poet, addressed by Ovid	6	10
Perwich, Susanna		d.1661	English	Learned woman, musician	6	10
Phila		d.287 BCE	?	Noblewoman, politician	6	10
Philippa, Queen of England	Philippa of Hainault	d.1369	Flemish	Queen consort, regent	6	10
Phillips, Katherine		d.1664	English	Poet	6	10
Pilkington, Letitia		d.1750	Irish	Poet	6	10
Pix, Mrs. (Mary Pix)		1666–1709	English	Novelist, playwright	6	10
Poitiers, Diana de		1500–1566	French	Noblewoman, Mistress to Henry II of France	6	10
Porcia, daughter of Cato		d.43 BCE	Roman	Learned woman	6	10
Pozzo, Modesto		1555–1592	Italian	Write r	6	10
Praxilla		5th century BCE	Greek	Lyric poet	6	10
Proba (Valerie Falconia)		4th century	Roman	Poet	6	10
Renata, Duchess of Ferrara (Renée de France)		1510–1574	French	Duchess	6	10
Rohan, Anne de		1584–1646	French	Poet	6	10
Rohan, Marie Eleonore de		1626–1682	French	Abbess, writer	6	10
Roland, Madame		1754–1793	French	Writer, politician	6	10
Roper, Margaret (daughter of Sir Thomas More)		1505–1544	English	Writer, translator	6	10
Roper, Mary (daughter of Margaret Roper)		d.1572	English	Learned woman, translator	6	10
Rosares, Isabella de		16th century	Catalan	Preacher	6	10
Rowe, Mrs. Elizabeth		1674–1737	English	Poet, novelist	6	10
Rufina, Claudia		1st century	Roman	Writer	6	10
Russel, Lady Elizabeth		d.1609	English	Poet, musician	6	10
Russel, Lady Rachel		d.1723	English	Author	6	10
Sade, Laura		d.1348	French	Petrarch's muse	6	10
Sappho		7th-6th century BCE	Greek	Poet	6	10
Scala, Alexandra		1475–1506	Italian	Scholar	6	10
Schurman, Anna Maria		1607–1678	German-Dutch	Painter, engraver, poet, scholar	6	10
Scudery, Madeleine de		1607–1701	French	Writer	6	10
Anne de Seguier		16th century	French	Poet	6	10
Semiramis (based on the historical Shammuramat)		9th century BCE	Assyrian	Queen	6	10
Seturman, Madame, another name for Anna Maria van Schurman		1607-1678	German	Painter, musician, philosopher, scholar	6	10
Sevigne, Marchioness de		1626–1696	French	Letter writer	6	10
Seymour, Lady Arabella		1575–1616	English	Noblewoman	6	10
Seymour Ladies (Ann)*		1538-1588	English	Writer	6	10
Seymour Ladies (Jane)*		d.1561	English	Writer	6	10
Seymour Ladies (Margaret)*		16th century	English	Writer	6	10
Sforza, Catherine		1483-1509	Italian	Noblewomen	6	10
Sforza, Isabella		1503-1561	Italian	Letter writer	6	10
Sheridan, Mrs. Frances		1724–1766	Irish	Novelist, playwright	6	10
Sophronia		4th century	Roman	Martyr	6	10
Sulpicia (wife of Quintus Fulvius Flaccus)	Sulpicia by Orioli	3rd century BCE	Roman	Lady of "virtue"	6	10
Sunderland, Countess of (Dorothy Spencer)		1617–1683	English	Noblewoman	6	10
Suze, Countess de la (Henriette de Coligny, Comtesse de la Suze)		1618–1673	French	Poet, songwriter	6	10
Sydney, Mary, Countess of Pembroke		1561–1621	English	Writer, translator	6	10
Tanaquil		7th-6th century BCE	Roman	Roman queen	6	10
Telesilla		6th-5th ventury BCE	Greek	Poet	6	10
Theano Locrencis (Melica)*		5th century BCE	Greek	Poet	6	10
Theano of Crete*		6th century BCE	Greek	Poet, philosopher	6	10
Theano Thuria or Metapotino*		3rd century BCE	Greek	Poet	6	10
Thomas, Mrs. (Corinna)		1675–1731	English	Poet	6	10
Thymele		1st century	Greek	Poet, composer, mentioned by Martial	6	10
Tishem, Catherine		d.1595	Flemish	Learned woman	6	10
Tollet, Elizabeth		1694–1754	English	Poet	6	10
Tymicha		4th century BCE	Greek	Philosopher	6	10
Valeria		d.315	Roman	Roman empress, protectoress of Christians	6	10
Valliere, Mademoiselle de la		1644–1710	French	Mistress to Louis XIV	6	10
Veturia		5th century BCE	Roman	Roman matron	6	10
Vigne, Anne de la		1634–1684	French	Poet	6	10
Warwick, Countess of (Mary Rich)		1625–1678	Irish	Benefactress	6	10
Weston, Elizabeth Jane		d.1612	English-Czech	Poet	6	10
Wharton, Anne		1659–1685	English	Poet, dramatist	6	10
Winchelsea, Anne Kingsmill Countess of		1661–1720	English	Poet	6	10
Zenobia		3rd century	Syrian	Queen, warrior	6	10
