= Élisabeth Guibert =

18th-century French writer and playwright

Élisabeth Guibert (31 March 1725, Versailles - 1788) was an 18th-century French woman writer.

Elisabeth Guibert is the author of several plays dealing with conventional subjects or inspired by classical themes. In addition to her theatre, she also published many poems extolling the virtues of a simple life and lamenting the infidelity in the Almanach des Muses 1766, 1767, 1768 and 1769.

Élisabeth Guibert benefited a pension from Louis XV. In her Dictionnaire historique, littéraire et bibliographique des Françaises et des étrangères naturalisées en France, Fortunée Briquet wrote that her works were "remarkuable for their ease and wit."

== Works ==
- 1768: Le Sommeil d’Amynthe, Paris, Veuve Duchesne
- 1768: Les Filles à marier, one-act comedy in verse, Paris, Veuve Duchesne
- 1775: Les Philéniens ou le patriotisme, Paris, Lesclapart
- 1770: Pensées détachées, s.l. [Bruxelles]
- 1764: Poésies et œuvres diverses, s.l. [Paris], (this work includes La Coquette corrigée, tragédie contre les femmes, Le Rendez-vous, comedy in one act and in verse, Les Triumvirs, tragedy presented 5 June 1764, epistles, poems, vers de société, etc.)

== Sources ==
- Nicolas-Toussaint Des Essarts, Les Siècles littéraires de la France ou Nouveau dictionnaire, historique, critique, et bibliographique, de tous les écrivains français, morts et vivans, jusqu'à la fin du XVIIIe, Paris, Firmin-Didot, 1803, (p. 369–370)
- Ferdinand Hoefer, Nouvelle Biographie générale, t. XXII, Paris, Firmin-Didot, 1862, (p. 1015—6)
- Joseph-Marie Quérard, La France littéraire, ou Dictionnaire bibliographique des savants, historiens et gens de lettres, Paris Firmin Didot, 1829, (p. 522)
