= Cambra =

In British legend, Cambra was the daughter of Belinus the Great, a legendary king of the Britons, and married to Antenor, the second King of the Cimmerians. The Cimmerians changed the name of their tribe to Sicambri in honor of Cambra. Cambra's son by Antenor, Priamus the Younger, succeeded his father when he was twenty-six.

According to John Tritemicus, Cambra was so beautiful and wise that the Frankish monarchy obeyed her as if she was an Oracle, and she converted the people to civility from barbarianism. The Saxons, who apparently identified Cambra with the same status as that of a King or priest, developed the proverb Sy Camber, used to refer to any man who spoke as wisely as Cambra.

According to John Lewis's history of Great Britain, Cambra taught Noblemen to build cities and castles; she taught women how to dress properly and to use modest countenance, how to sow flax and hemp, and to convert it into cloth; she gave laws and upright judgement to the people; she was a prophet and a priest to Diana; she made the laws of the Sycambrians, by which it was forbidden that the King's sons by second or third wives (etc.) should be called "princes", lest the Kingdom should be confounded. She built the cities Neomag and Neopag and "died around the Year from the Creation 3590, and before Christ 373, Jonathas being High Priest of the Jews."
