= José Garnelo =

Spanish painter

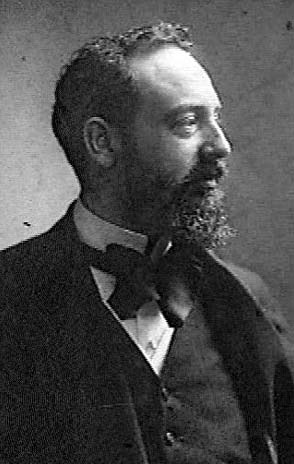
José Garnelo (before 1900)

José Santiago Garnelo y Alda (25 July 1866 – 28 October 1944) was a Spanish painter in the Naturalist style. He mostly did genre scenes, portraits and scenes from Classical history.

== Biography ==
Garnelo was born in Enguera. His father was a doctor and the family settled in Montilla when he was only two. In 1882, after graduating from the local schools, he went to Seville to study philosophy and literature, but soon abandoned those pursuits to enroll at the "Escuela de Bellas Artes de Santa Isabel de Hungría", where he studied painting until 1885 with Eduardo Cano and Manuel Ussel de Guimbarda.

He continued his studies at the Real Academia de Bellas Artes de San Fernando in Madrid, where his instructors included Casto Plasencia and Dióscoro Puebla. He received a medal for his work in 1886. Two years later, he was awarded a stipend to study in Rome.

In 1892, he obtained first prize at the National Exhibition of Fine Arts for his classical portrait of Cornelia Africana. The following year, he earned a medal at the World's Columbian Exposition and was appointed a Professor at the Escuela de Bellas Artes de Zaragoza.

In 1895, he moved to the Escuela de Bellas Artes in Barcelona, where one of his students was Pablo Picasso. In 1900, he was named to a chair at the Real Academia and became a full member there in 1912. Three years later, he was appointed a Sub-Director at the Museo del Prado. In 1930, he became Director of the "School of Painting, Sculpture and Engraving". In addition to his canvases, he helped restore the choir at the Basilica of San Francisco el Grande, Madrid and the ceilings at the Casón del Buen Retiro, as well as creating original murals for the Convent of the Salesas Reales. He also worked as an illustrator; notably for a book by his father, El hombre ante la estética o tratado de antropología artística.

His numerous honors include the Order of Carlos III. He was also named a "Painter to the Crown" in 1902. Several retrospectives have been held, notably in Córdoba (1972, 1984, 1985, 1992 and 1997). He died in Montilla, aged 78. Most of his works are now held by the Museo Garnelo, which was opened in 2000 in Montilla.

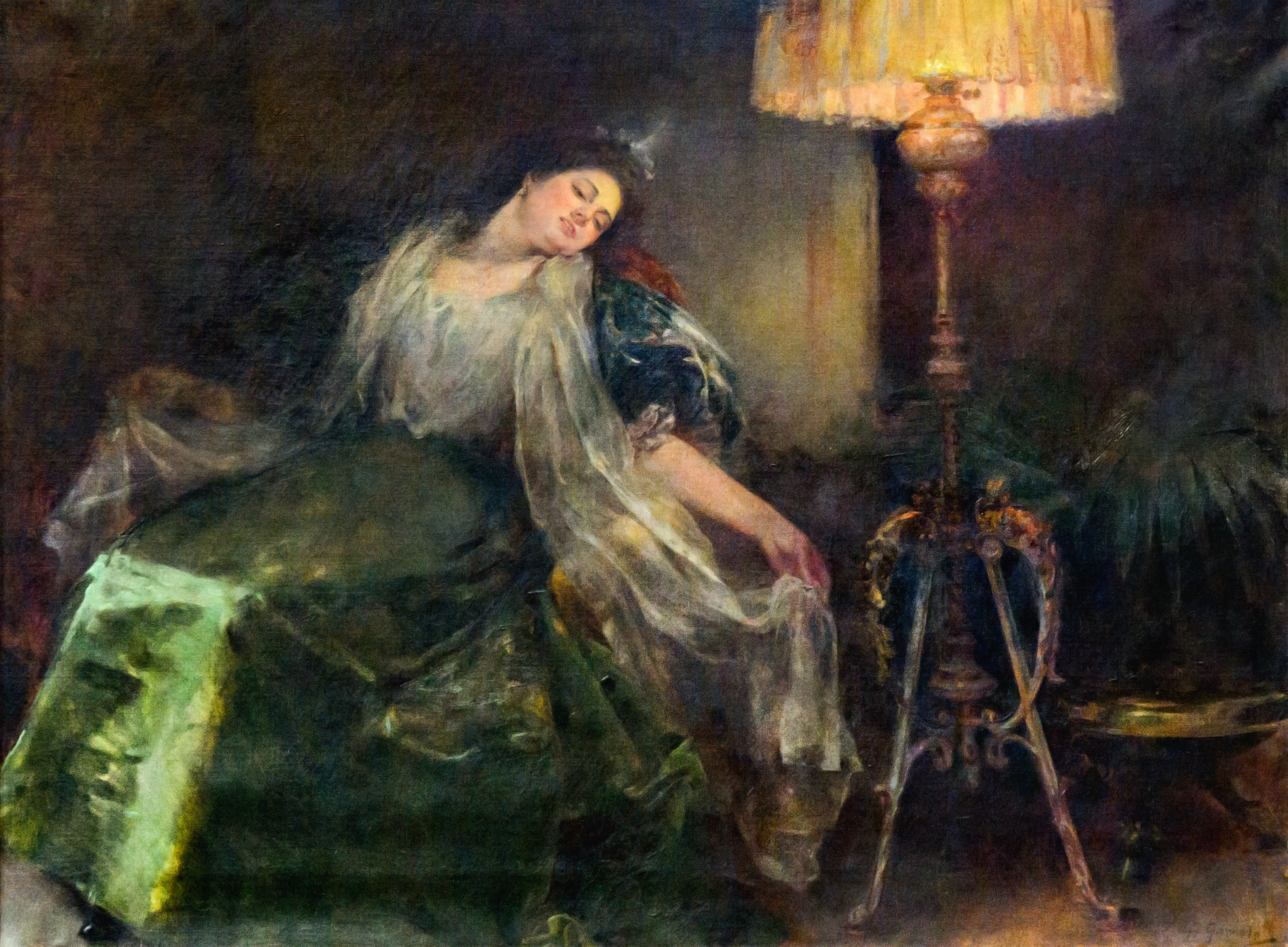
Dona adormida - Museu Nacional d'Art de Catalunya

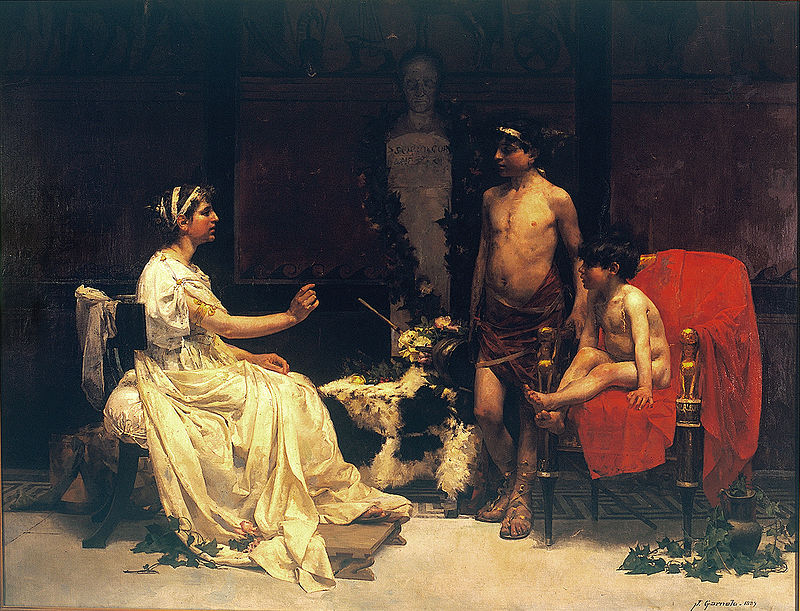
Cornelia with her sons, Tiberius
and Gaius Gracchus.

== Honors and awards ==
- Commander of the Order of Legion of Honour
- Commander of the Order of Charles III
