= Octavie Guichard =

French translator

Octavie Guichard, who became Octavie Belot by marriage, then Octavie du Rey de Meynières, was born in Paris in 1719 and died in Chaillot in 1805. She was a French writer and translator.

== Biography ==
As the impoverished young widow of a lawyer at the Paris parliament, Octavie Belot learned English to carry out translations following the death of her husband. She obtained the protection of the playwright Charles Palissot de Montenoy and the farmer general Alexandre Le Riche de La Pouplinière. She translated Samuel Johnson, David Hume and Sarah Fielding while writing short novels herself. She frequented the rich library of the president of the parliament, Jean-Baptiste-François du Rey de Meynières, whom she married in 1765. She was widowed a second time and later died in the former commune of Chaillot, near Paris, at the age of 86.

== Publications and manuscripts ==
- Réflexions d’une provinciale sur le discours de Jean-Jacques Rousseau touchant l’origine de l’inégalité de condition parmi les hommes (1756)
- Observations sur la noblesse et le Tiers-État (1758)
- Mélanges de littérature anglaise (1759) volume 1 volume 2
- Samuel Johnson, Histoire de Rasselas, prince d'Abyssinie (1760)
- David Hume, Histoire d'Angleterre, depuis l'invasion de Jules César jusqu'à l'avènement de Henry VII (1763–1765)
- Sarah Fielding, Ophélie, roman traduit de l'anglais (1763)
- Letters to François-Antoine Devaux (1762–1781)
