= Jacqueline-Aimée Brohon =

French novelist and essayist

Jacqueline-Aimée Brohon (1731–1778) was a French novelist and essayist. Influenced by Jean-Jacques Rousseau, her writings were anti-clerical and inclined towards mysticism.

== Works ==
- Les amans philosophes, ou Le triomphe de la raison. 1755.
- Les Grâces de l'ingénuité, nouvelle. 1756.
- Instructions édifiants sur le jeûne de Jésus-Christ au désert. 1791.
- Réflexions édifiants. 1791.
