= Amaesia Sentia =

1st-century BC Roman woman

Amaesia Sentia is mentioned by Valerius Maximus as an instance of a female who pleaded her own cause before the praetor, around 77 BC. She was called "Androgyne", from having a man's spirit with a female form. A crater on asteroid 4 Vesta has been named Sentia after her.
