= Nicolas-Toussaint Des Essarts =

French bibliographer

Nicolas-Toussaint Lemoyne des Essarts or Desessarts, (1 November 1744 – Coutances, 5 October 1810 aged 65) was a French bibliographer.

== Publications ==
First a lawyer then a bookseller, he was the author or editor of voluminous compilations of which the best known are:

- Causes célèbres, 1773–1789, 196 volumes in-12;
- Dictionnaire universel de police contenant l’origine et les progrès de cette partie importante de l’administration civile en France..., Paris : chez Moutard, 1786–1790, 8 vol. in-4°, LXVII-5116 p. (articles ‘abandon’ à ‘police’)
- Bibliothèque de l'homme de goût, 1798, 3 volumes in-8 (rewritten in 1808, with Antoine Alexandre Barbier);
- Les Siècles littéraires de la France, ou Nouveau dictionnaire, historique, critique, et bibliographique, de tous les écrivains français, morts et vivans, jusqu'à la fin du XVIIIe, 1800–1803, 7 volumes in-8.
- Nouveau dictionnaire bibliographique portatif, ou Essai de bibliographie universelle; contenant l'indication des meilleurs ouvrages qui ont paru dans tous les genres, tant en France que chez les nations étrangères, anciennes et modernes; précédé d'une nouvelle édition des Conseils pour former une bibliothèque peu nombreuse, mais choisie, Paris : chez l'auteur, 1799
- Précis historique de la vie, des crimes et du supplice de Robespierre et de ses principaux complices (Paris, chez Des Essarts, An V (1797), 3 tomes où Robespierre y est décrit comme «le plus hypocrite, le plus lâche, le plus féroce des monstres à figure humaine», le «plus exécrable des tyrans qui ait paru sur la scène du monde pour le malheur de l'humanité» (Tome I)
