= Anne de Deyster =

Belgium artist (died 1747)

Anne de Deyster was an artist from Bruges, specialised in history painting. She was trained by her father, Louis de Deyster, whose biography she wrote. Anne's painting style was so similar to her father's that some of her work was confused with his. She died on 14 December 1747.
