= Catherine Descartes =

French poet and philosopher (1637–1706)

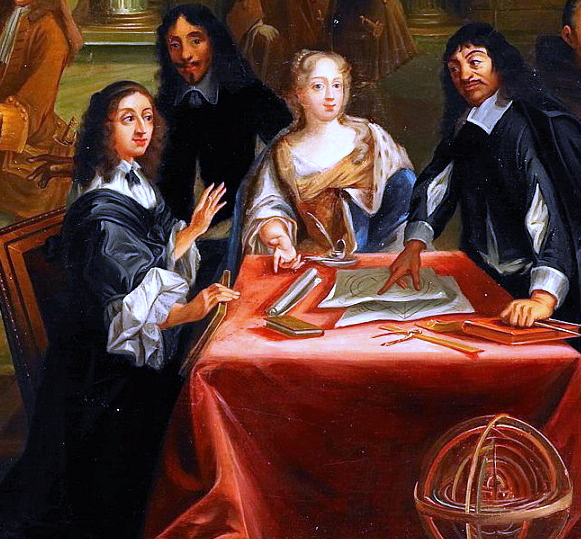
Queen Christina of Sweden (left), Catherine Descartes (center), René Descartes (right)

Catherine Descartes (1637–1706) was a French poet and philosopher, and the niece of French philosopher René Descartes. A prominent figure in the French salon movement, her best known works included "Shade of Descartes" ("L'Ombre de Descartes") and Report on the Death of M. Descartes, the Philosopher. She was also interviewed by her uncle's biographer Adrien Baillet following his death, due to her close relationship with him. Regarded as one of the influential cartésiennes, a sub-movement of women who discussed the works of René Descartes, she became more critical of the masculine aspects of his philosophy later in life.

== Early life ==
Born in 1637, her father was Pierre de la Bretailliere, the older brother of René Descartes and a councillor in the Parlemant of Brittany. Catherine Descartes was the youngest of four sisters and had at least two brothers. Admired for her intellect, there was a popular saying that her famous uncle's "mantle" had "fallen on the distaff side".

== Influence in the salon movement ==
Catherine Descartes had a major influence on the salon movement in 17th-century France. She, along with Anne de la Vigne and Marie Dupré, were seen as cartésiennes, or representatives of Descartes and his work. Catherine Descartes was seen in fashionable salons including Madame de Rambouillet's chambre bleue, and had a friendship with Madame de Sévigné and her daughter, Madame de Grignan. Catherine Descartes also kept in contact with Madeleine de Scudéry, a popular 17th century French writer.

Catherine Descartes engaged in a playful dialogue with her friend Anne de la Vigne, starting with her 1673 poem "Shade of Descartes" ("L'Ombre de Descartes") in which she invited La Vigne to spread her uncle's ideas and combat misunderstandings about his philosophy. Catherine Descartes's hope was that together, they could also create a union of masculine and feminine ideas. Combining René Descartes's work, Catherine Descatres's vocal platform, and Anne de la Vigne's championship of the movement, they could create an alliance between men and women hunting for the truth.

Later into the movement, Catherine Descartes's opinion of her uncle's work changed, as she began to question her uncle's more masculine views on philosophy. In a poetic view of Descartes's life, Catherine Descartes had a figure known as Lady Philosophy appear to Queen Christina, one of the main supports of René Descartes's work. Catherine Descartes began to feminize René Descartes's works, adding more elements of ladies in power influencing the outcomes of his works. While there is no clear reason as to why Catherine Descartes's opinion of her uncle's work changed, his work also is credited with bringing forth a figurative death of René Descartes's works at the time.

== Death of Rene Descartes ==
Following the death of René Descartes, a scholar by the name of Adrien Baillet started working on the biography of René Descartes. Baillet, seeking information on his life, started interviewing his nephews and niece. Catherine Descartes was the only of the four Descartes sisters to assist Baillet. Baillet commented on her mental fortitude, saying it upheld her uncle's renown.

The death of René Descartes also became a topic of speculation. One year after Baillet's biography was published, a book written by Pierre-Daniel Huet argued that Descartes's death was entirely faked. He did not believe that René Descartes had died and thought that a log had been placed in his coffin instead of his body.

== Report on the Death of M. Descartes, the Philosopher ==
About 2 years after Baillet's second volume of the biography of René Descartes was published, Catherine Descartes published her part of the story in a book called Report on the Death of M. Descartes, the Philosopher (Relation de la mort de M. Descartes, Le Philosophe). This book was mainly a collection of poems, but the poems told an overarching story of René Descartes death.

In the beginning of The Death of the Philosopher, Catherine Descartes speaks about a pastor from Stockholm. She talks about how after figuring out she was the niece of René Descartes, the pastor told her that he was in Stockholm when her uncle passed. The pastor told Catherine Descartes a great many details on the death of her uncle. From these discussions, she got enough information to generate her own report which is The Death of the Philosopher.

After publishing her works, Catherine Descartes kept in contact with another woman, Madeleine de Scudéry, via letter. In these letters, Catherine and Madeleine exchange poems and other literature works with each other, of which Catherine Descartes went further into her poem on her uncle's death.
