= Capillana =

Capillana (died 1549) was a north Peruvian female ruler prior to the arrival of the Spanish conquistadors.

When conquistador Francisco Pizarro arrived in the northern parts of Peru he sent a group of men to explore the land. In their exploration they stumbled upon the native people. Ruler Capillana and her people were wary of Pizarro just like he and his men were wary of her. Capillana decided to make the first move and bravely challenged Pizarro’s masculinity when she bordered his ship and stated that she, a woman, was brave enough to set foot on his ship so now he, a man and captain, should not be afraid to set foot on the land. The following day Pizarro did indeed come down to shore where he was greeted with a celebration organized by Capillana and her people. As Capillana and Pizarro developed an attachment, she shared very valuable information with him and he in turn held her in very high esteem.

Pizarro did attempt to convert her to Christianity before his departure to Spain but he was unsuccessful. However, as she independently learned Spanish she ended up converting on her own.

It is said that as his ship was about to leave one man, Pedro Alcon, who had developed a passion for Capillana, declared that he wanted to get off the ship and stay with her. Rather than allow him to fight his way off the ship, sword in hand, the crew chained him up below deck.

In the Peruvian library of the Dominican friars there remains a manuscript of her work. In this manuscript Capillana hand painted ancient Peruvian monuments and provided a historical explanation in accompaniment to each monument written in the Castilian language. In addition to this, the manuscript holds a representation of many of the Peruvian plants with interesting comments on their properties and uses.

Although many stories point to Capillana’s life unfolding as expressed above, some authors make the point that Capillana is an augmentation of the word capullana which is the general term defining a Peruvian female ruler of the north. It is possible that the name Capillana was simply a metamorphosis of the term capullana by the Spanish conquistadors.
