= Amage =

2nd-century BC Sarmatian queen

- Ἀμάγη
- Occupation: queen

Amage (Ancient Greek: Ἀμάγη) (fl. 2nd-century BC) was a Sarmatian queen. According to the writings of Polyaenus, she was the wife of the Sarmatian king Medosacus (Μηδόσακκος). she ruled as regent to a dissolute husband. They were from the coast of the Euxine Sea.

Having observed that her husband was "totally given up to luxury", she took over the government, acting as a judge of causes, stationing garrisons, repulsing enemy invasions, and was such a successful leader that she became famous through all Scythia.

As a result of this fame, the people of the Tauric Chersonesus, having been harassed by a neighboring Scythian king, requested a treaty with her. As a result of the formation of this treaty, she wrote to the Scythian prince, requesting that he cease harassing the people. When he replied contemptuously, she marched against him with 120 strong and seasoned warriors, and gave each warrior three horses. In one night and one day, she covered a distance of 100 stades (roughly 184.81 kilometers), and arrived at the palace, surprising the inhabitants and killing all the guards. As the prince was taken off guard, and perceived her force to be larger than it really was, she was able to charge and personally kill him, as well as his friends and relatives.

Thus she enabled the people of Chersonesus to regain free possession of their land. She allowed the prince's son to live and rule the kingdom on the condition that he not invade nearby kingdoms. This took place towards the end of the second century, BC.
