= Susanna Perwich =

English musician used as example of virtue (1636 – 1661)

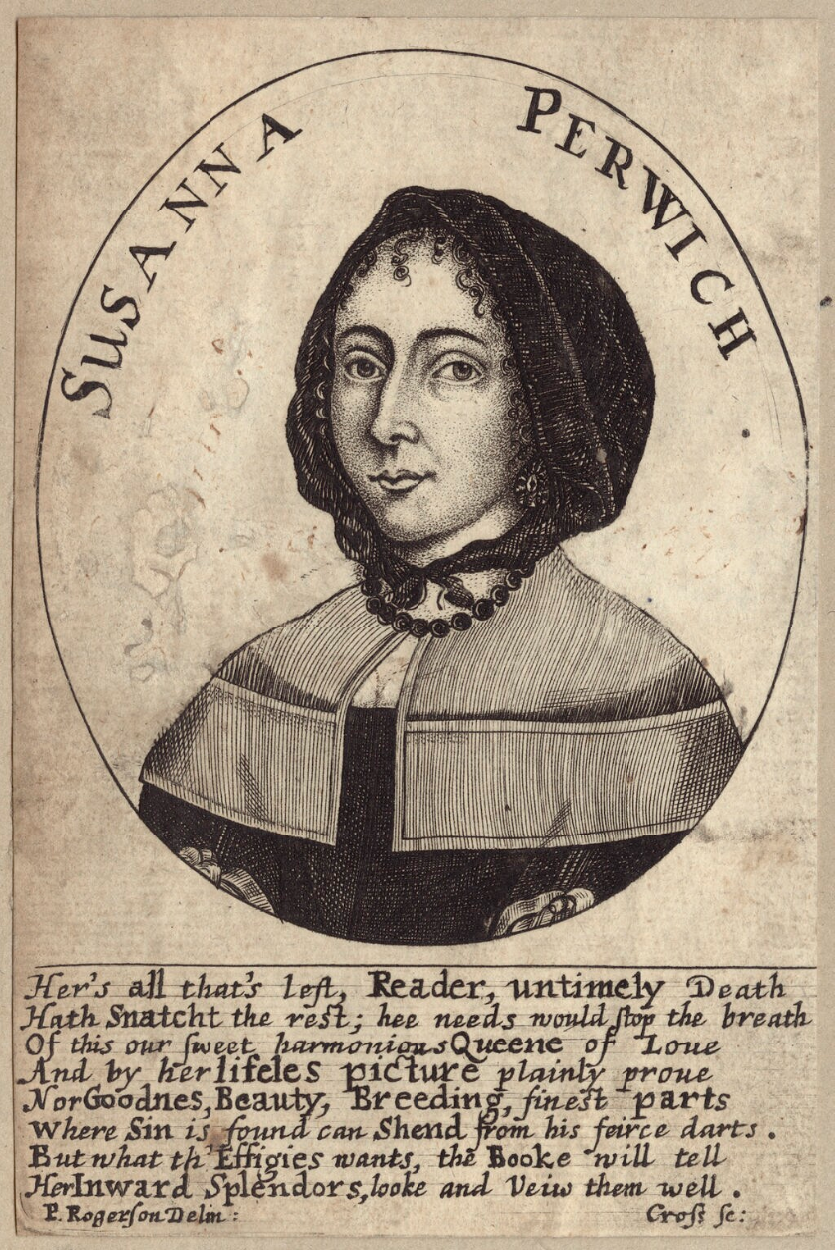
Susanna Perwich depicted in a pamphlet after her death

Susanna Perwich (c. 1636 – 1661) was an English music teacher and embroiderer. She is known from a pamphlet written by her brother-in-law on the event of her early death, which celebrates her virtues as an example for other young women to follow. Noted in the pamphlet as a skilled embroiderer, she has been proposed as the creator of a seventeenth-century embroidered cabinet now held by the Los Angeles County Museum of Art.

== Life ==
She was one of at least six daughters of Robert Perwich and his wife Mary, who from 1643 ran a school for girls in Hackney. Susanna was taught at the school, and later became leader of the school’s orchestra and a teacher there herself. A highly regarded musician, she apparently performed for international audiences of music masters.

After the sudden death of her fiancé, Susanna became increasingly devoted to prayer, pious pursuits and study of the Bible, turning down several further marriage proposals.

Susanna died on 3 July 1661 of an illness she contracted after sleeping on damp bed-linens at a friend’s house. At her request, her funeral was attended only by women.

== Skills and education ==
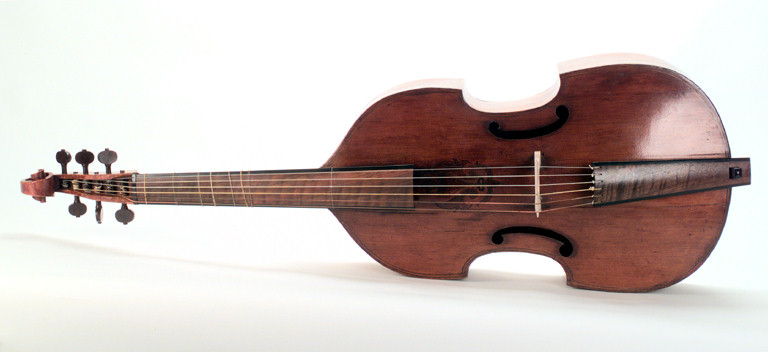
17th-century viol

The school where Susanna studied and taught had a curriculum including the performing arts, including 'romance reading'; handicrafts and calligraphy; and domestic skills such as accountancy and cookery. Batchiler’s description of her education and teachers has been seen as a defence of the practice of educating girls outside the home.

Susanna was taught tuning and musical notation, and had a viol teacher for the last seven years of her life. Her favourite pastime was 'playing divisions on a ground' (that is, a viol), but she was also proficient on the harpsichord and lute and a skilled singer, dancer and composer.

Batchiler also praises Susanna’s skill at needlework. Based on the Perwich coat of arms appearing on it, Rosner suggests that Susanna may be the creator of an elaborate embroidered cabinet which employs the labour-intensive 'queen stitch' and depicts the rarely-embroidered biblical story of Ruth.
