= Jonathas =

Jonathas is a given name. Notable people with the name include:

- Jonathas de Jesus (born 1989), Brazilian footballer
- Jonathas Granville (1785–1839), Haitian educator, legal expert, soldier, and diplomat

Other

- David et Jonathas, French opera

== See also ==
- Jonathan (name)
