= Françoise-Albine Benoist =

18th-century French author

Françoise-Albine Benoist (1724 – 1808 or 1809) was a French novelist, playwright and essayist born in Lyon.

She wrote a few theater works that were never played. She was also a journalist for Le Journal des Dames.

Little is known about her life. In April 1754 she married painter and draughtsman Jean-Marie Benoist.

According to Manon Roland, Benoist may have been a model for the heroine of Charles-Albert Demoustier's Lettres à Emilie.

Her most famous work is Les Aveux d'une jolie femme.

== Works ==
- Journal en forme de lettres, mêlé de critiques et d'anecdotes, par Madame B**, 1757.
- Journal des dames, February 1759, p. 80-86.
- Journal des dames, April 1759, p. 37-46.
- Mes principes, ou la Vertu raisonnée, par Madame B***, Amsterdam and Paris, Cuissart, 1759.
- « Lettre d'une femme sincère », Journal des dames, July 1761, p. 53-66 .
- « Seconde lettre d'une femme sincère », Journal des dames, September 1761, p. 212-224 .
- Élisabeth, roman par Madame ***, Amsterdam, Arkstée and Merkus, 1766 (with two further editions by the same publisher in 1766).
- Célianne, ou les Amans séduits par leurs vertus, par l'auteur d'« Elisabeth », Amsterdam and Paris, Lacombe, 1766 (with a further edition in Amsterdam in 1767, in Paris, aux dépens de la Compagnie in 1768; translated into italien as Celianna, ovvero, Gli amanti sedotti dalle loro virtù in Venice in 1785; there is a modern edition by Olga B. Cragg published in Saint-Etienne in 2002 ISBN 978-2-86272-272-6).
- La Vertu persécutée, ou, Lettres du colonel Talbert, par Madame ***, auteur d'Elisabeth, Dresden, Walther, 1767 (with two further editions in Amsterdam and Paris in 1767 ).
- Paméla françoise ou la Vertu en célibat et en mariage, dépeinte dans les lettres de Messieurs de Talbert & Mozinge, rédigées dans le goût des lettres de Clarisse & Grandisson par madame Riccoboni… Nouvelle édition, Amsterdam and The Hague, 1768.
- La Supercherie réciproque, comédie en un acte et en prose, Amsterdam and Paris, Durand, 1768.
- Le Triomphe de la probité, comédie en deux actes et en prose; imitée de l'Avocat, comédie de Goldoni, Paris, Le Jay, 1768 (and included in a collection).
- Agathe et Isidore, Amsterdam and Paris, Durand, 1768 (republished as Les Avantures du beau cordonnier; ou Les amours d'Isidore, né marquis d***, et de la vertueuse Agathe veuve du marquis d'Olfonte. Tableau intéressant de la sympathie des cœurs nobles, The Hague and Frankfurt, Van Duren, 1769).
- Sophronie, ou Leçon prétendue d'une mère à sa fille, London and Frankfurt, Eslinger, 1769; London and Paris, Veuve Duchesne, 1769.
- L'Erreur des désirs, Paris, Veuve Regnard and Demonville, Lyon, Cellier, Rouen, Abraham Lucas, 1770.
- Folie de la prudence humaine, Amsterdam and Paris, Veuve Regnard and Demonville, 1771.
- Les Erreurs d'une jolie femme ou l'Aspasie françoise, Brussels and Paris, Veuve Duchesne, 1781 (translated into German as Die Irrtümer eines artigen Frauenzimmers oder die franzosische Apasia, Breslau, Meyer, 1782; translated into English as Aspasia; or, the dangers of vanity. A French story, taken from real life, London, Bew, 1791 ).
- Les Aveux d'une jolie femme, Brussels and Paris, Veuve Duchesne, 1782.
- Lettres sur le désir de plaire, 1786. available at Gallica
