= Lady Carcas =

French legend

The legend of Lady Carcas (French: Dame Carcas) is an etiological story about the origin of Carcassonne's name.

== The legend ==
The legend takes place in the 8th century, during the wars between Christians and Muslims in the southwest of Europe. At the time, Carcassonne was under Saracen rule and Charlemagne's army was at the gates to reconquer the city for the Franks. A Saracen princess named Carcas ruled the Knights of the City after the death of her husband.

The siege lasted for five years. Early in the sixth year, food and water were running out. Lady Carcas made an inventory of all remaining reserves. The villagers brought her a pig and a sack of wheat. She then had the idea to feed the wheat to the pig and then throw it from the highest tower of the city walls.

Charlemagne lifted the siege, believing that the city had enough food to the point of wasting pigs fed with wheat. Overjoyed by the success of her plan, Lady Carcas decided to sound all the bells in the city. One of Charlemagne's men then exclaimed: "Carcas sonne!" (which means "Carcas rings"). Hence the name of the city.

== Historicity ==
Lady Carcas appears to be a fictional character. The legend dates back to oral traditions of the 12th century, was written down in the 16th century by Jean Dupre and rewritten in the 17th century by Guillaume Besse and Guillaume Catel. Charlemagne could not have besieged Carcassonne, as his father Pepin had already taken the city from the Saracens in 759 - Charlemagne would have then been 17.

Similar legends link a number of historical characters in other times and places with similar ruses. One of the earliest was the 6th century BCE Greek Bias of Priene who successfully resisted the Lydian king Alyattes by fattening up a pair of mules and driving them out of the besieged city. When Alyattes' envoy was then sent to Priene, Bias had piles of sand covered with corn to give the impression of plentiful resources.

== Traces in the city ==
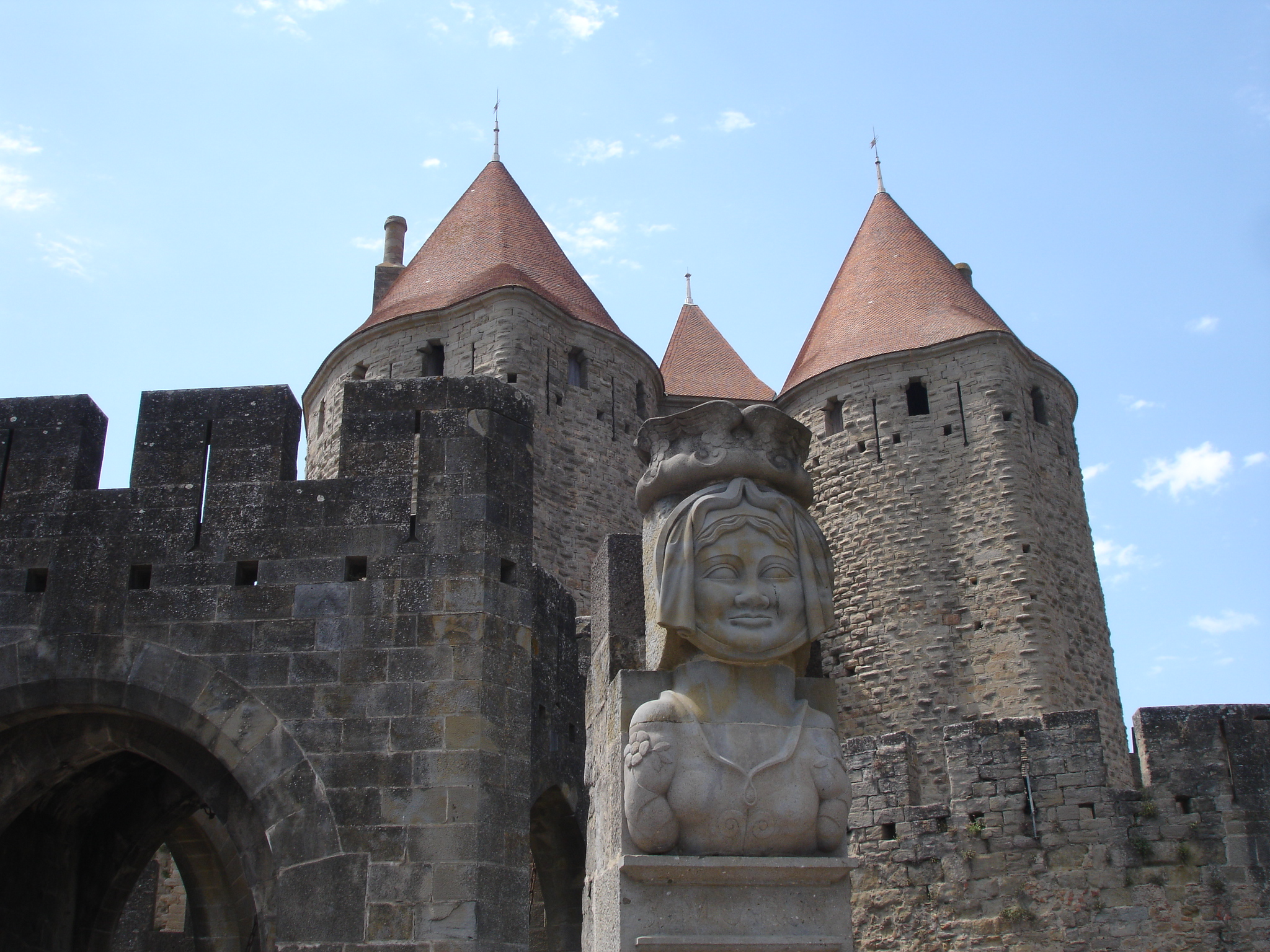
The replica of lady Carcas's bust.

- At the entrance of the drawbridge, a replica of Lady Carcas's bust welcomes visitors. The original, dating from the 16th century, is preserved in the castle.
- There is an inn called Dame Carcas in the city.
- Shortbreads called "Friandises de Dame Carcas" are sold by the city's grocery store.
