= Anne de La Roche-Guilhem =

French writer and translator

Anne de La Roche-Guilhem or La Roche-Guilhen (July 24, 1644, Rouen – 1707 or 1710, England) was a French writer and translator.

== Biography ==
Anne de La Roche-Guilhem was the daughter of Charles de Guilhen and Marie-Anne d'Azemar. Through her mother, she was a grand-niece of the poet Antoine Girard de Saint-Amant. Anne de La Roche-Guilhem became known for several works of fiction. A Protestant, she emigrated to England on the revocation of the Edict of Nantes (1685), perhaps via the Netherlands. Her father died without a fortune, and she never abjured from Protestantism, so she sought, unsuccessfully, for protectors by dedicating some of her works to princesses or to Charles II. Rare on tout (Rare-in-all), her comedy-ballet, was composed for the king's birthday (1677) and performed at the Hall Theatre, Whitehall, on 29 May 1677. She also translated Spanish works. Finally, settled in London, she died there surrounded by Huguenot friends. The circulation of her works written in England, printed in Holland, and secretly distributed in France, shows how Protestant networks worked during this troubled time.
