= Costanza d'Avalos Piccolomini =

Duchess of Amalfi

Costanza d'Avalos Piccolomini (1504–1575) was a duchess of Amalfi. A lady of great worth, she cultivated Italian poetry with great success. Charles V gave her the title of princess, as a mark of his esteem. Her poems have been published several times with those of Victoria Colonna, her cousin; there are several of her pieces also in the collection by Ludovico Domenichi (Lucca, 1559, 8vo; and Naples, 1595).

In later years she moved to the convent of Santa Chiara a Napoli, where she died.

== Links ==
- Bio
