= Thoma (scholar) =

Andalusian scholar (died 1127)

Thoma (died 1127), also called Habiba of Valencia, was an Arab Andalusian woman scholar known for writing several authoritative books on grammar and jurisprudence. Very little is known about her life.
