= Margherita Costa =

17th-century Italian singer and writer

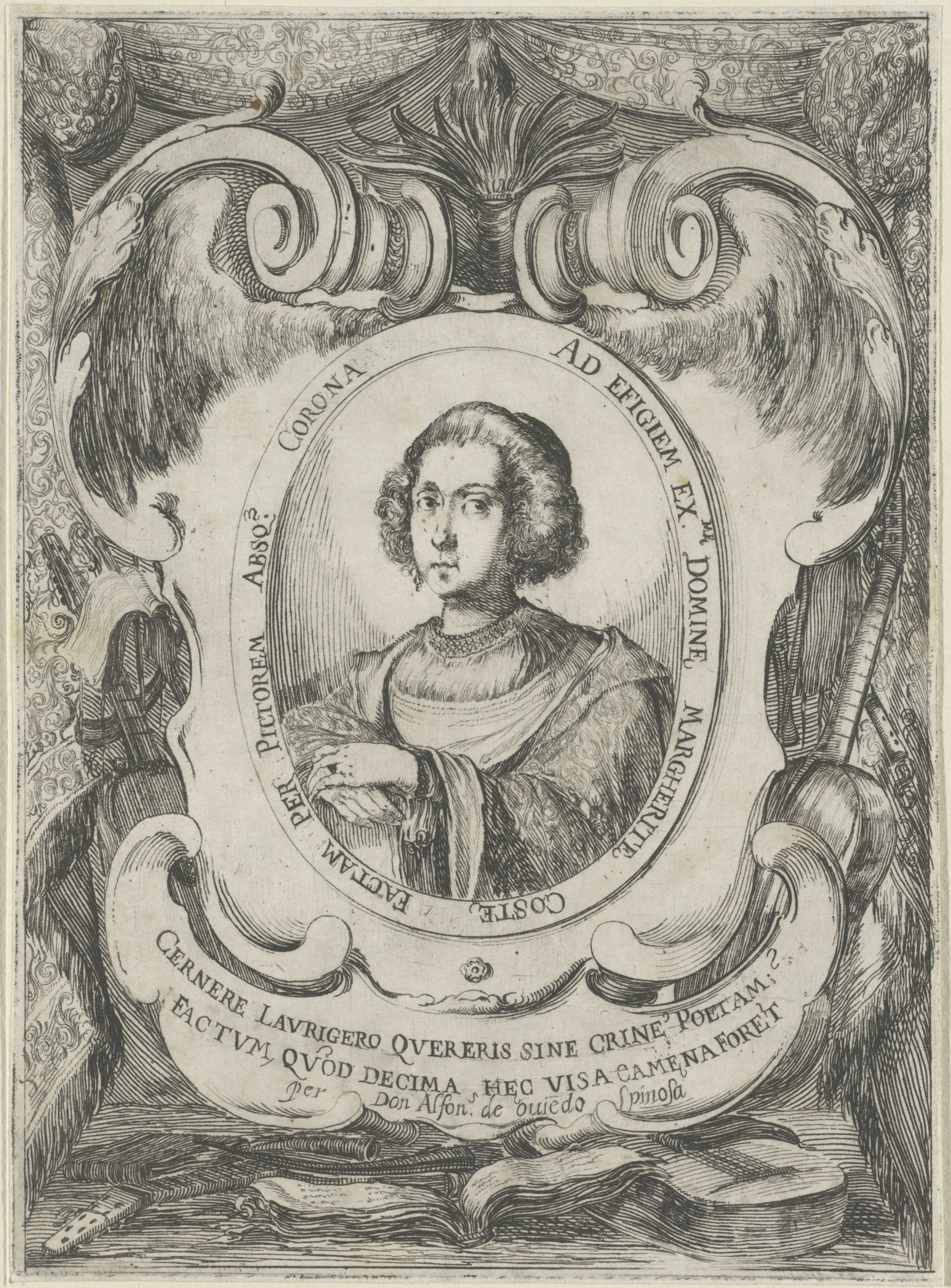
- Born: c. 1600; Rome, present-day Italy
- Died: after 1657
- Occupation: Singer, writer, performer

Margherita Costa (c. 1600 – after 1657), was an operatic soprano, poet, playwright and feminist.

The most Baroque of the seventeenth-century Italian women writers, she stands out for her original style and themes. As a poet, she employs a variety of genres, using humor and irony to criticize prevailing attitudes towards women and to mock the politics of her times. She is the first Italian woman writer to use humor and satire in her published works. Some of her poems are partially autobiographical for they include allusions to events in her life and complaints about her lack of fortune and literary recognition. Her poetry stresses the obstacles she faced as a woman and the difficult life of women in general. Costa was a prolific writer, publishing two books of prose, six volumes of poetry, three plays, two narrative poems and an allegorical pageantry, in verse, for knights on horseback. (See "Introduction" to Margherita Costa, *Voice of a Virtuosa and Courtesan: Selected Poems, p. 19.)

== Biography ==
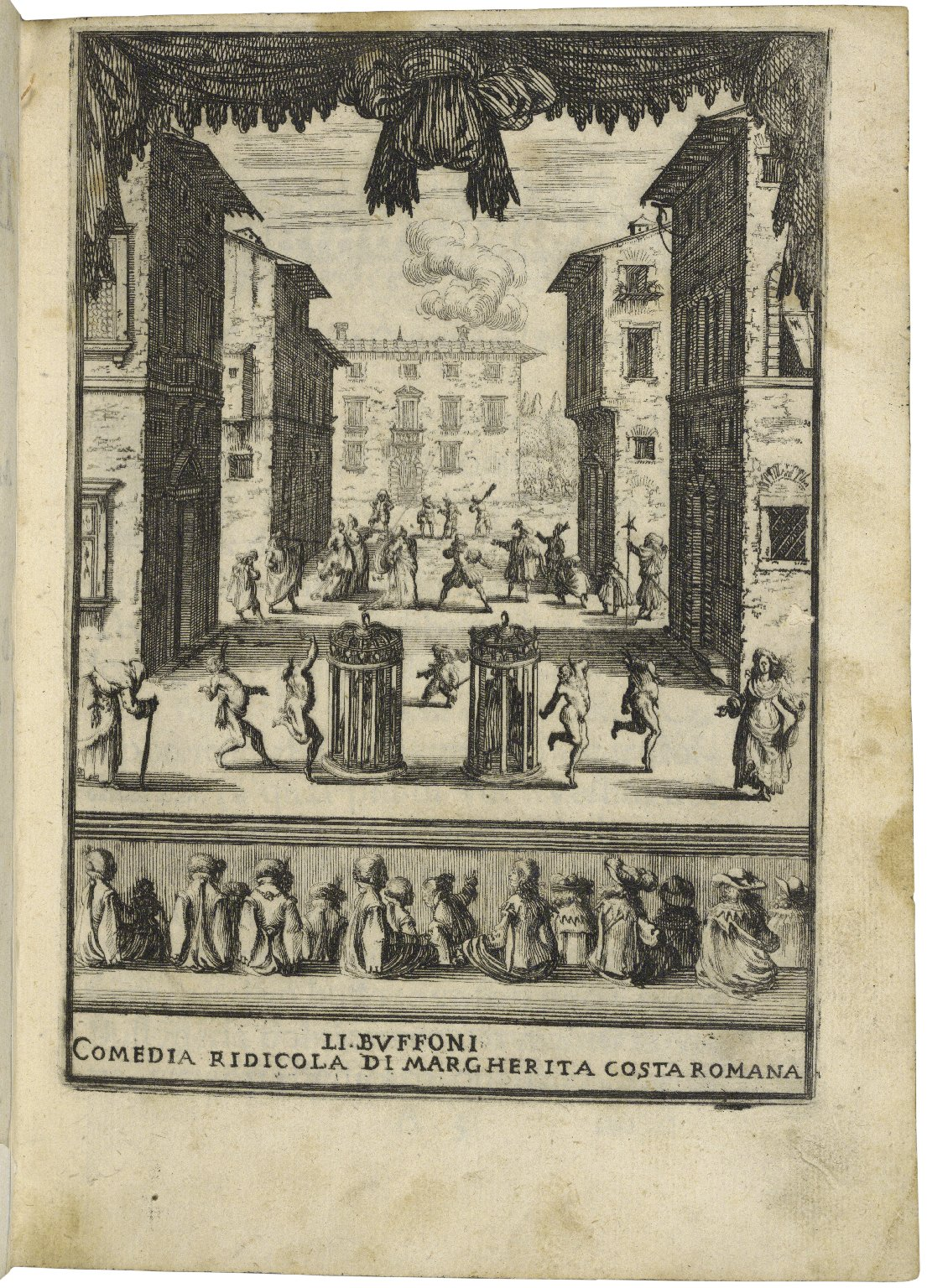
Frontis illustration of a production of Costa's play Li buffoni: comedia ridicola in a 1641 printed edition of the play.

Costa was born in Rome, Italy. She and her sister, Anna Francesca, began their careers as singers and perhaps courtesans in Rome, where they received the patronage of families such as the Aldobrandini. In 1628, Costa moved to Florence, where she began her literary career. At the ducal court, she obtained the protection of Grand Duke Ferdinando II de' Medici of Tuscany, Vittoria della Rovere, and other members of the Medici family. She may have also married the court buffoon Bernardino Ricci, known as "Tedeschino" (as well as the "Cavalier of Pleasure"), to whom she dedicated a 1641 comedy entitled The Buffoons. During this period, Costa also published several volumes of poetry, a drama, and a collection of love letters. Also printed under her name was a historical account of Ferdinando's 1627 voyage to Germany, but because Costa acknowledged that she received her information from a member of the ducal court, her detractors accused her of not having composed the work herself.

In 1644, Costa left Florence and returned to Rome under the protection of Cardinal Francesco Barberini, to whom she dedicated a sacred poem about the Roman Saint Cecilia, the patron saint of music. Costa briefly left the city the following year in order to assume a post as a singer at the court of Duchess Christine of Savoy. Costa would later portray the Turin court in a collection of poems dedicated to the duchess and published in 1647, at which time she had been invited to travel from Rome to Paris with the group of musicians of the composer Luigi Rossi, to sing in his opera L'Orfeo, which was performed to glorify the court of the young Louis XIV. Over the course of that year, under the patronage of Cardinal Mazarin, she published a volume of poetry in honor of the king's mother and regent, Anne of Austria, and the text for an equestrian ballet dedicated to the cardinal, as well as the volume for Christine of Savoy.

Little is known about the latter part of her life. She was in Venice in August 1650 and from there she most likely traveled to Germany. In the dedication to the dukes of Brunswick-Lüneburg of her play, *Gli amori della Luna, (The Loves of the Moon Goddess), she claims that she lived for four years under a foreign sky. The play was published in Venice in 1654 on her way back to Rome. The last preserved document by Margherita is a letter written on May 4, 1657, to Mario Chigi, commander-in-chief of the papal armies and brother to Pope Alexander VII, imploring assistance. In this letter, she describes herself as a widow with two daughters. The date of her death is unknown.

== List of works ==
- Istoria del viaggio d'Alemagna del serenissimo Gran Duca di Toscana Ferdinando Secondo (in Italian), Venice, c. 1630
- La chitarra (in Italian), Frankfort: per Daniel Wastch, 1638
- Il violino (in Italian), Frankfort: per Daniel Wastch, 1638
- Lo stipo (in Italian), Venice, 1639
- Lettere amorose (in Italian), Venice, 1639
- Flora feconda, poema (in Italian), Florence: Massi e Landi, 1640
- La Flora feconda, drama (in Italian), Florence: Massi e Landi, 1640
- Li buffoni (in Italian), Florence: Massi e Landi, 1641
- Cecilia martire poema sacro (in Italian), Rome: Mascardi, 1644
- La selva di Diana (in Italian), Paris: Craimoisy, 1647
- La tromba di Parnaso (in Italian), Paris: Craimoisy, 1647
- Festa reale per balletto a cavallo (in Italian), Paris: Craimoisy, 1647
- Gli amori della Luna (in Italian), Venice: Giuliani, 1654
- Voice of a Virtuosa and Courtesan - Selected Poems: A Bilingual Edition (in Italian and English), New York: Bordighera Press, 2015
- Die schöne Frau bedarf der Zügel nicht; Porträt, Werkauswahl und Übersetzung von Christine Wunnicke, Zweisprachige Ausgaben: Deutsch / Italienisch, Berlin : Berenberg Verlag GmbH, 2023, ISBN 978-3-949203-48-0

== Bibliography ==
- Costa, Margherita (2015), Costa-Zalessow, Natalia (ed.), Voice of a Virtuosa and Courtesan: Selected Poems. A Bilingual Edition., Translated by Joan E. Borrelli, New York: Bordighera Press
- Costa-Zalessow, Natalia (2005), "Margherita Costa", in Albert N Mancini and Glenn Palen Pierce (ed.), Seventeenth-Century Italian Poets and Dramatists, Detroit: Gale Cengage Learning, pp. 113–18
- Cox, Virginia (2008), Women's Writing in Italy, 1400–1650, Baltimore: Johns Hopkins University Press
- Capucci, Martino (1984). "Costa, Margherita". Dizionario Biografico degli Italiani (in Italian). Vol. 30: Cosattini–Crispolto. Rome: Istituto dell'Enciclopedia Italiana. ISBN 978-88-12-00032-6.
