= Fortunée Briquet =

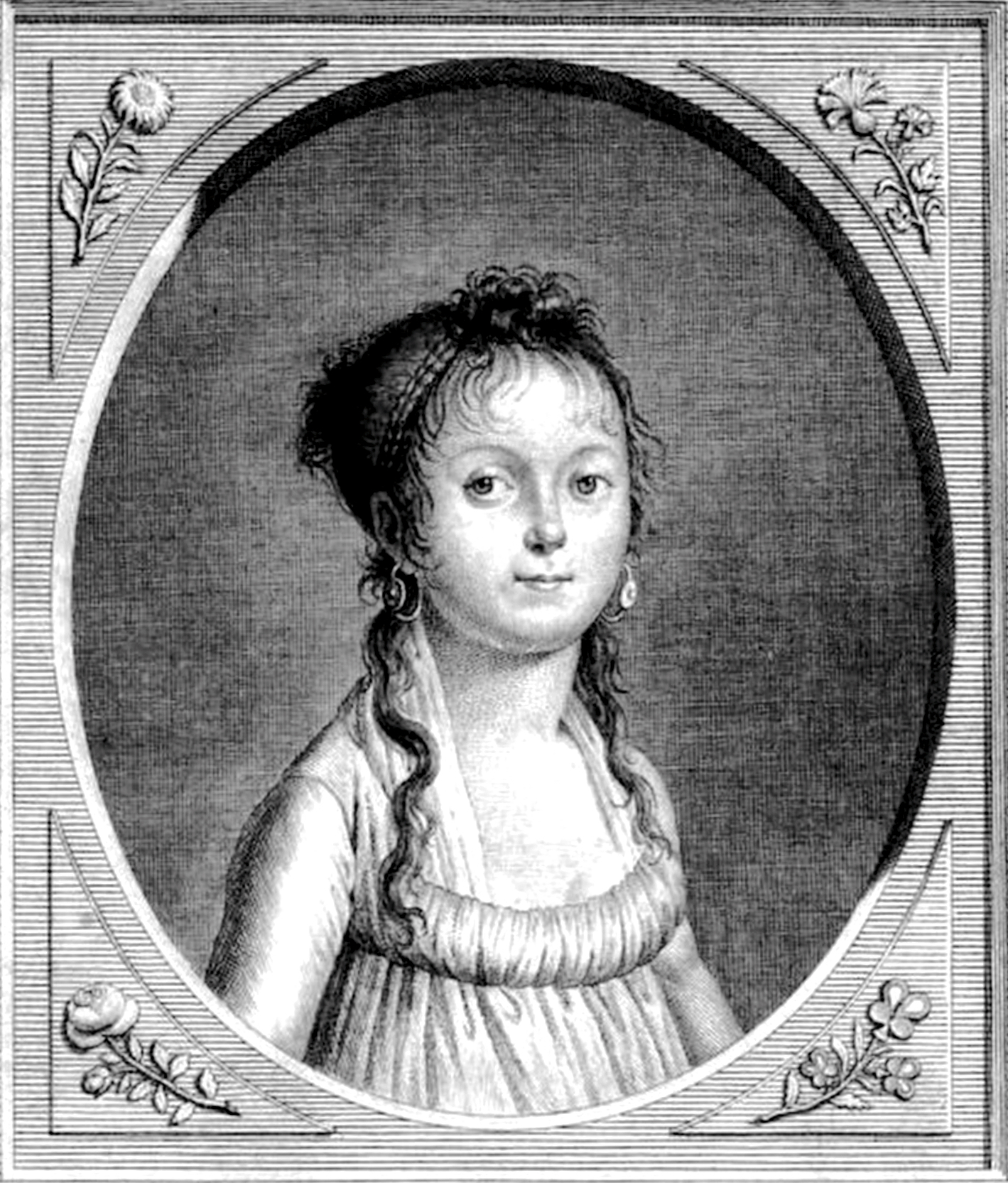
- Fortunée Briquet (1804 engraving)
- Born: Marguerite-Ursule-Fortunée Bernier; 16 June 1782; Niort
- Died: 14 May 1815 (aged 32); Niort
- Occupation: Writer
- Spouse: Hilaire-Alexandre Briquet

Marguerite-UrsuIe-Fortunée Briquet (16 June 1782 – 14 May 1815) was an early 19th-century French femme de lettres and polygraph.

== Biography ==
Fortunée Bernier received a very good education and was one of the most outstanding students of Hilaire-Alexandre Briquet, who later became her husband, and who inserted her early writings in the Almanach des Muses. In 1800, an Ode sur les vertus civiles opened her the doors of the Society of Literature and of the salons of Paris. Fanny de Beauharnais, the First consul aunt, gave the signal for applause by sending these verses, with her poem l’Ile de la Félicité:

Muse and Grace at once! one day what will she be? Talents have no age, She was born immortal.

Later were published Odes sur la mort de Dolomieu, an ode to Denis Lebrun, la Vertu est la base des républiques, and her Mémoire sur Klopstock, sa vie et ses ouvrages, which earned her entrance in the "Athénée des arts" of Paris.

However, Fortunée Briquet's most important work is undoubtedly her famous Dictionnaire historique, littéraire et bibliographique des Françaises et des étrangères naturalisées en France (Paris, Gillé, 1804, in-8°).

She still produced a few pieces in 1807, but stopped writing in 1808.

The historian Apollin Briquet was her son.

== Bibliography ==
- Henri Beauchet-Filleau, Charles de Chergé, Paul Beauchet-Filleau, Dictionnaire historique et généalogique des familles du Poitou, Paris, Hachette, 1876, (p. 785).
- Nicole Pellegrin, « Fortunée Briquet »
