= Marianne-Agnès Falques =

French writer (1720–1785)

- Born: 1720; Lyon
- Died: 1785 (aged 64–65)
- Other names: Marianne-Agnès Pillement Falques Mme de Fauques; Mme Fauques de Vaucluse; Mlle de ** Mlle Fauque
- Occupation: Writer

Marianne-Agnès Falques, also known as Marianne Fauques, was a French author of romance novels and other topical writings, including the History of Madame the Marquise de Pompadour.

== Biography ==
A study of the life of Marianne Falques reveals several conflicts.

She was born in Lyon, France in about 1720 (although some sources say 1721 or 1732). She may have been the daughter of the painter Paul Pillement (b. 1694 Lyon), and Anne Astier who were married in Lyon in 1727.

Nicknamed "The Vaucluse," she was a woman of letters who wrote in English and French in the 18th century; during her lifetime her works were mostly translated into English and German.

Her pseudonyms were many, including: Marianne-Agnès Pillement Falques, Mademoiselle de Fauques, Madame Fauques de Vaucluse, Mademoiselle de **, Mademoiselle Fauque. (The Virtual Identity File lists many different versions of her name that have appeared on her printed publications.)

=== Early years ===
Falques became a nun; reportedly, her family had sent her there for financial reasons, but after ten years of religious life, she was able to have her religious vows annulled and she left the convent. Some sources say she tried to return to her family but was rejected. Most agree that she moved to Paris to begin her writing career.

=== Exotic tales ===
Falques's first works were said to be translations, though they may have been original stories that were labeled as such. In 1751, she published, The Triumph of Friendship Book, translated from the Greek, and listed herself, the author, using the mysterious name: Mlle. de **. Her second, titled Abassaï, an Oriental History, was a romantic tale published in 1753. (In 1758, she would write a novel with the subtitle, "by the author of Abassaï.")

Her third title was Tales from the Harem, translated from Turkish, published in The Hague, 1753.

=== Scandalous writings ===
Falques herself became the subject of scandalous chronicles in Paris and moved into exile in England. From there, she published in English and then translated into French, several controversial views of French society, notably the text titled the History of Madame la Marquise de Pompadour in 1759, a book that was well known by Voltaire and all of Paris, and illustrates the full measure of the author's audacity and independent spirit. In the book, the author claims that the Marquise de Pompadour was illegitimate by birth and made many other inflammatory allegations.

Meanwhile, the real-life Madame de Pompadour, the subject of the Falques book, occupied the position of "favorite" as the official mistress of King Louis XV, and Falques' scandalous text was not received well at court. One source says that the Count d'Affry, serving as Minister of France, was charged by the King to take all of the copies of the book and destroy them. However, the book went into multiple printings in French, English and German, frustrating the King's desires and d'Affry's efforts.

This text grew famous throughout Europe in its time. With her unflattering portrait of the "favorite" (as the chief mistress to the King was known), Falques opened for ridicule the Court's widespread corruption. According to Gary Kates,

"Fauques's method of combining sexual and political intrigue into a synthesis that essentially blamed the failures of Louis's reign on debauchery spawned a virtual literary industry during the second half of the eighteenth century. French hack writers of various stripes took up residence in England to lambaste their King. Among the most prominent was Charles Théveneau de Morande, whose Gazetier cuirassé (1771) was a scathing portrayal of decadence at the court of Louis XV."

=== Death ===
Some sources say Falques died in 1773. (An original source shows that a married woman by the name of Marie-Anne Pillement died in Paris on 22 November 1773.) Some sources say Falques returned to France to end her days "after 1777." Still others propose that she died about 1785, perhaps in London.

== Books ==
Many of her books are still available online or from booksellers around the world, with the author's name shown in a variety of spellings, usually Falques or Fauques.

- The Triumph of friendship book translated from the Greek, by Mlle. de **, London, 1751. (read online)
- Abassaï, oriental history, From the Baghdad printing works. 1753.
- Contes du serrail, translated from Turkish, The Hague, 1753.
- Prejudice too braved too and followed, or the memories Mlle Oran by Mlle de ***, London, 1755.
- The last war of beasts, fable to serve the history of 18th century, by the author of Abassaï, London, 1758.
- Frederick the Great at the Temple of Immortality, London, 1758.
- Memories of Mme F. C. MC against [Mr. Celesia, Minister of the Republic of Genoa], London, 1758.
- The History of Madame la Marquise de Pompadour, translated from the English, at the expense of S. Hooper in London, 1759
- The Vizirs: Or The Enchanted Labyrinth: An Oriental Tale, London, 1774.
- Moral and funny dialogues, in English and French. For youth education, etc., London, 1777.

== Bibliography ==
- Boudin Stéphanie, A novelist and adventurer of the Enlightenment: Marianne-Agnès Falques, aka la Vaucluse, thesis under the supervision of Geneviève Artigas-Menant, Paris-Est Créteil Val-de-Marne University, 1994.cf. http://www.sudoc.fr/130510254 [ archive ] or directly on the UPEC library catalog: http://bibliotheque.u-pec.fr/accueil/ [ archive ]
- Grondin Angélique, The Representation of Women in the Orient by Marianne-Agnès Falques, thesis under the supervision of Marie-Françoise Bosquet, University of Réunion, 2005.
