= Argentaria Polla =

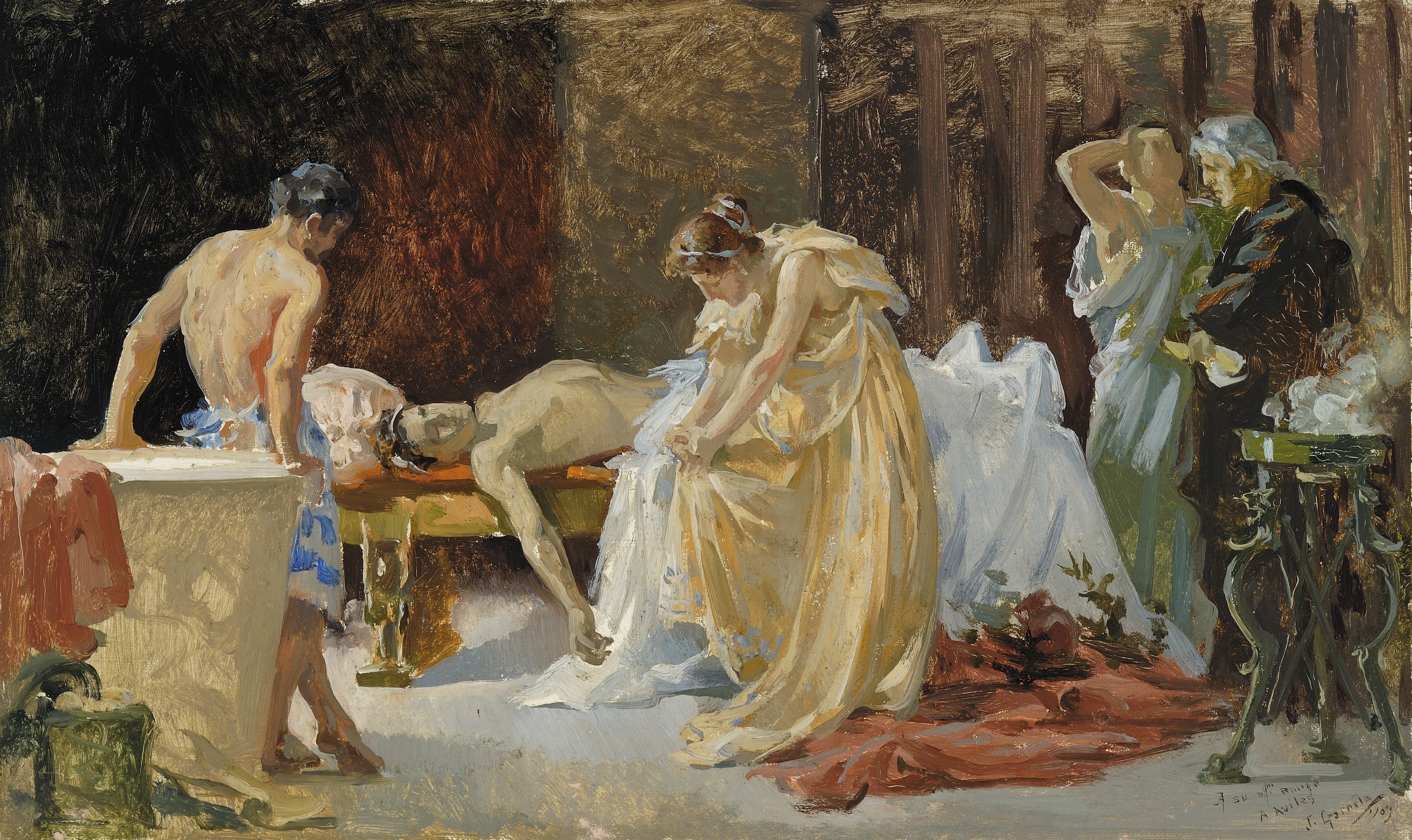
- The Death of Lucan by José Garnelo—Argentaria is depicted attending to Lucan
- Occupation: Art patroness
- Era: Classical antiquity
- Known for: Patron of Martial and Statius
- Spouse: Lucan

Argentaria Polla was an ancient Roman art patroness. On the anniversary of the death of her husband—the poet Lucan—likely between the years 90 and 92 CE, Martial and Statius—two other Roman writers—composed poems for a ceremony commemorating his birthday. It is likely that this event was organized by Polla, who also likely served as a patron for both authors. Statius, who describes Polla as "a pearl among wives" ("rarissima uxorum"), also explicitly mentions that she requested the birthday ode for Lucan. Martial, in another poem, refers to Polla as his "queen" ("regina"), which—according to the classicist Emily A. Hemelrijk—likely references her role as his patroness. Moreover, according to the philologist Peter White, it is likely that Polla was intensely involved with literary activity, as Statius describes Polla utilizing the adjective "docta" ("well versed"), which White argues is unlikely to merely describe her relationship with the famous poet Lucan. The 5th-century CE author Sidonius Apollinaris implies that Polla may have aided Lucan in the creation of the Pharsalia, though White suggests that this story could easily be a later invention and denigrates the account as "sentimental fancy."

The exact interpretation of the passage by Statius is unclear due to his unusual usage of the term "consuleremus." The passage in question, "cum hunc diem forte consuleremus," is translated by John Henry Mozley in the 1928 Loeb Classical Library edition of the text as "when we happened to be considering the celebration of the day." However, White argues that the verb consulo can only mean "to consider" when paired with a neuter pronoun, an adjective, or the term rem ("thing"). According to White, the word is typically equivalent to the English term "to consult," which necessitates that the text be awkwardly translated as "to consult the day." White proposes that the text may be corrupt and suggests that the original version perhaps utilized the verb "coleremus" ("to inhabit"), which may have referred to his presence at the ceremony. Based on this emended translation, and the usage of the term "forte" ("as luck would have it") in the text, White suggests that the passage indicates that Statius was likely already attending a celebration when Polla approached him and requested a poem. Statius describes the act of Polla entreating him for a poem, stating that she "requested it as a favor" ("imputari sibi voluit"). The specific term Statius utilizes, "imputari," is associated with the charging of payment for debts, perhaps—according to White—indicating that Statius had felt as if his clients had a moral obligation to remunerate him for his efforts. Alternatively, the classicist Robin Nisbet suggests that the usage of the term "imputari" may merely constitute wordplay based on the phonetic similarity of the name Argentaria to Latin argentarius ("banker").

In these poems, Polla is generally portrayed as embodying the traits associated with an ideal Roman wife: Statius states that she is chaste ("castae") and lists "beauty," "simplicity," "graciousness," "birth," "charm," and "elegance" ("forma," "simplicitate," "comitate," "sanguine," "gratia," "decore") among her supposed virtues. Hemelrijk argues that, since Polla had financed these poems, it is likely that she had intended to depict herself as exemplifying the model Roman matron. Yet, these poems also take great care to depict her social status and education—Statius describes her as talented ("ingenio") and notes her wealth ("censu"). Moreover, according to Nisbet, the mention of her "blood" ("sanguine") may reference a possible genealogical relationship to poets such as Argentarius, the pupil of Lucius Cestius Pius. Hemelrijk suggests that Argentaria may have sought to couch her own aggrandizement within more traditional descriptions of her as a model Roman matron. In particular, Hemelrijk suggests that the emphasis on Lucan underlying many of these poems may be a vehicle through which Polla—whilst casting herself as the Roman idea of a devoted widow—can communicate her prestigious relationship with a Roman senator.

Hemelrijk suggests that Argentaria Polla could be the same individual as the Polla mentioned as the wife of Pollius Felix, a patron of Statius. Hemelrijk concedes that such a hypothesis is unprovable, though she argues that it would not be unusual for a Roman widow to remarry whilst remaining dedicating towards their deceased spouse. It is possible that this notion may find support in ancient literature, as Sidonius mentions that a certain Argentaria Polla was "twice yoked in wedlock" to two separate poets. These two poets have been interpreted as Statius and Lucan, though Nisbet argues that it is highly unlikely that Sidonius—a man well acquainted with the works of Statius—would erroneously record his marital status, especially considering that his true spouse is documented in the Silvae. However, Sidonius provides factually inaccurate statements regarding other important Roman writers, thereby casting doubt upon the veracity of his claims regarding Argentaria.

Statius addresses the wife of Pollius Felix utilizing terminology pertaining to finance, writing "for you no sterile strongbox strangles hoarded riches, nor do ramifications of grasping usury torment your soul: your wealth is plain to view, and you enjoy it in educated temperance." According to Nisbet, the usage of such fiscal language to describe the wife of Pollius Felix parallels the same word play regarding debts he expressed towards Argentaria Polla. Furthermore, Statius states that the apples of the Hesperides ought to be placed on the lap of the wife of Pollius, who is "worthy and will not demean so great an honor." Nisbet suggests that this joke references the traditional conceptualization of gold as superior to silver and may therefore serve as wordplay based on the name "Argentaria," which is akin to "argentum" ("silver").
