= Anne-Eléonore de Béthune d'Orval =

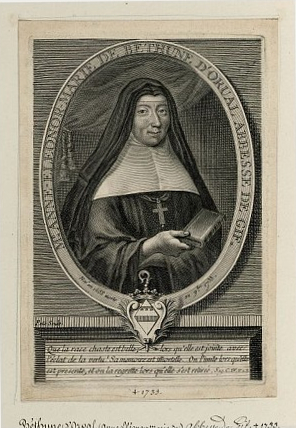
- Born: 1657; Paris
- Died: November 28, 1733 (aged 75–76)
- Parent(s): François de Béthune, Duc d'Orval, Comte de Muret et de Villebon; Anne d'Harville

Anne-Eléonore de Béthune d'Orval (1657 – November 28, 1733) was a French ascetic writer and abbess of Notre-Dame du Val-de-Gif in Gif-sur-Yvette.

Anne-Eléonore de Béthune d'Orval was born on 1657 in Paris, the daughter of François de Béthune, Duc d'Orval, and Anne de Harville de Palaiseau. She served as abbess from 1687 until her death on 28 November 1733.

== Bibliography ==
- Reflexions sur l'Evanqgile
- Idée de la Perfection Chrétienne et Religieuse (Paris,. Nully, 1718)
- Reglement de l'Abbaye de Gis, avec des Reflexions
- Vie de Madame de Clermont-Monglat.
