= Arignote =

Pythagorean philosopher

Arignote or Arignota (/ˌærɪɡˈnoʊtiː, ˌærɪɡˈnoʊtə/; Ancient Greek: Ἀριγνώτη, Arignṓtē; fl. c. 500 BC) was a Pythagorean philosopher from Croton, Magna Graecia, or from Samos. She was known as a student of Pythagoras and Theano and, according to some traditions, their daughter as well.

== Life ==
According to the Suda, Arignote wrote:

- Bacchica (Βακχικά, Bakkhika, "Of Bacchus")
- The Mysteries of Demetra (Περὶ τῶν Δήμητρος Μυστηρίων, Peri ton Demetros Mysterion)
- A Sacred Discourse (Ἱερὸς Λόγος, Hieros Logos)
- Mysteries of Dionysus (Τελεταὶ Διονύσου, Teletai Dionysou)
- and other philosophical works

Writings attributed to her were extant in Porphyry's day.

Among the Pythagorean Sacred Discourses (Ἱεροὶ Λόγοι, ΄΄Hieroi Logoi΄΄) there is a dictum attributed to Arignote:

The eternal essence of number is the most providential cause of the whole heaven, earth and the region in between. Likewise it is the root of the continued existence of the gods and daimones, as well as that of divine men.
