= Margaret Lambrun =

Scottish woman who tried to assassinate Queen Elizabeth I

- Born: Stirling, Scotland

Margaret Lambrun was a Scottish woman who attempted to assassinate Queen Elizabeth I. She was caught and pardoned. Although not attested to in contemporary accounts, her story is mentioned in publications dating back to 1762.

== Life ==
Lambrun was born in Stirling. She and her French husband were both in service to Mary, Queen of Scots. Following Mary's death, and the death of her husband due to grief, Lambrun decided to assassinate Elizabeth I as revenge.

=== Attempted assassination ===
Lambrun adopted the alias of Anthony Sparke and dressed as a man to gain access to the palace. She brought two pistols: one with which to kill the queen, and one with which to commit suicide, as she didn't wish to be executed. However, while moving through a crowd to be closer to the queen, Lambrun dropped one of her hidden pistols and was seized by the guards.

When brought before Elizabeth I, per the Queen's request, Lambrun explained her plan and reasoning. Elizabeth I declared that by attempting the plan, Lambrun had fulfilled her duty to her husband and to Mary, and granted her a pardon under the condition she not attempt another assassination. Lambrun was also granted safe passage to the coast of France.

== Legacy ==
A poem about Lambrun's attempted assassination is in James Traill Calder's Poems from John O'Groat's.
