= Anne de Seguier =

French poet and salon holder

Anne de Seguier (fl. 1583), also given as Anne Séguier was a French poet and salon holder.

== Biography ==
Anne de Seguier was the daughter of Pierre Seguier (d. 1559), Lord of Verrières and the lieutenant-criminal of the Grand Châtelet in Paris and his wife Catherine Pinot. Seguier married Francois du Prat, Baron of Vitteaux and of Thiern. He was Chamberlain to the Duke of Anjou. They had three children, Antoine du Prat who married Chrétienne de Sayve, Anne and Philippine, who were educated in the court of Henry III. du Prat died on 8 April 1565 in Paris. Seguier married again to Hugues de La Vergne, Chamberlain and Captain of the guard of the Duke of Anjou. Her daughter Philippine married Clement, Baron of Cosnac and Limosin. Anne became a lady of Queen Catherine de' Medici and in 1584 she married Honorat Prévost, Lord of Chastellier-Portaut.

Seguier was considered a notable poet who wrote her work as a dialogue between Virtue, Honour, Pleasure, Fortune, and Death. She was also a Salon holder. Her daughters were known for their minds and skill in languages, knowledge and literature.

== See also ==
- A Cyclopædia of Female Biography, 1857, p. 678
- Women in Modern Times, 1919, p. 208
- Les femmes poëtes au seizième siècle, 1860, p. 71
