= Elizabeth Bland =

English Hebraist

Elizabeth Bland (fl. 1681 – 1712) was an Englishwoman celebrated for her knowledge of Hebrew.

Bland was the daughter and heiress of Robert Fisher, of Long Acre, and was born about the time of the Restoration. Her Hebrew teacher is said to have been Francis van Helmont, commonly known as Baron van Helmont. She was married on 26 April 1681 at St. Mary-le-Savoy to Mr. Nathaniel Bland, then a merchant of London and freeman of the Glovers' Company, but who in 1692 succeeded his father, Richard Bland, as lord of the manor of Beeston, near Leeds, Yorkshire, where he thenceforward resided.

Of their six children all but two, Joseph and Martha, died in infancy. It appears from Ralph Thoresby's Ducatus Leodiensis that Bland was alive in 1712. She is known only by a phylactery in Hebrew written at Thoresby's request for his Musæum Thoresbianum, to which she also presented a "Turkish Commission." Dr. Nathaniel Grew describes the phylactery as a scroll of parchment ¼ in. broad and 15 in. long, with four sentences of the law (Exod. xiii. 7-11, 13-17; Deut. vi. 3-10; and Deut. xi. 13-19) "most curiously written upon it in Hebrew." She taught Hebrew to her son and daughter.
