= Charlotte Saumaise de Chazan =

French poet and noblewoman

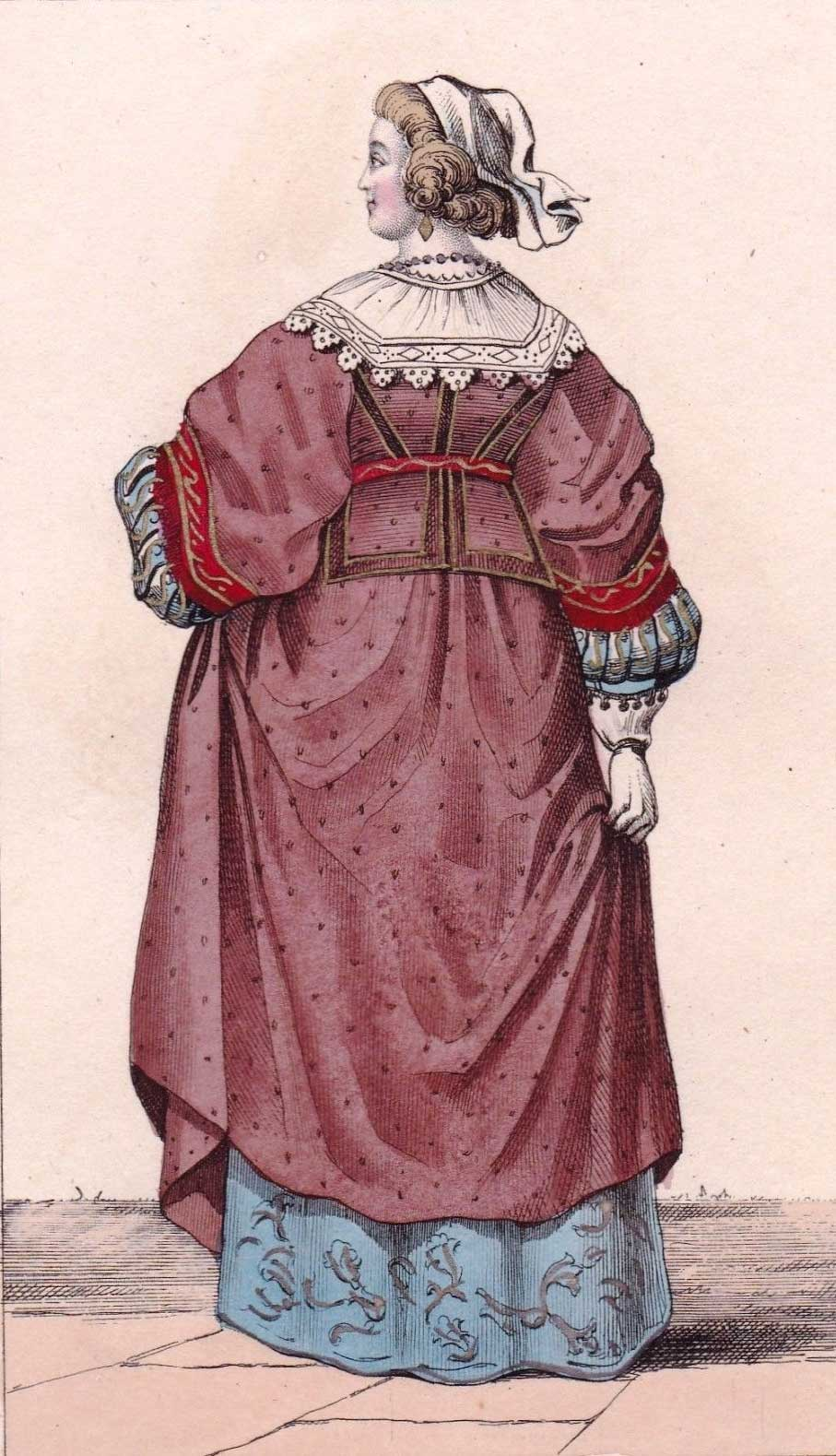
- Born: 1619; Paris
- Died: 1693 (aged 73–74); Paris
- Known for: Poetry and politics

Charlotte Saumaise de Chazan (1619–1693), also spelled Saumaize de Chazan and better known as Madame de Brégy, was a lady-in-waiting to the Queen of France, Anne of Austria, and the niece of French classical scholar Claude Saumaise. A popular figure in King Louis XIII's court, she wrote and published numerous poems and letters, and is associated with les Précieuses of the 17th-century French literature.

== Biography ==
Charlotte Saumaise de Chazan was born in Paris in 1619, the daughter of a secretary to Gaston, Duke of Orléans, Bégnine de Saumaise and one of the queen's maids, Marguerite Anne Hébert. Her uncle was also the scientist Claude Saumaise and it was he who looked after her education until Marie de' Medici took over.

She was married at the age of 14 to Lieutenant General Nicolas de Flécelles, Count de Brégy. de Chazan had a number of pregnancies which gave her four children, Anne-Marie, Élisabeth, Jean-Baptiste and Léonor. Her husband was away for most of their marriage. de Chazan was granted a separation of property(1651) and of body (1673). Her legal cases around this divorce created huge discussions among the Salon circles about the obligation of women to marry and bear children. The stories published at the time about women who left their families behind fueled several books. de Chazan left everything to Elisabeth.

De Chazan was a poet, known amongst the Précieuses as Belarmis and Belinde. She was occasionally employed to write verses by Louis XIV while she worked as Lady in waiting to Queen Anne of Austria. de Chazon wrote with the great names of Europe including to the Queens of England and particularly with Christina of Sweden, the Countess of Soissons, the Archbishop of Paris, and Monsieur, younger brother of the King of France. When the Queen died in 1666, de Chazon remained close to Philippe d'Orléans. She was included in the collection of verbal portraits gathered by Mademoiselle de Montpensier in 1659 and composed epigrams with Henriette de Coligny de La Suze. She died at the Palais-Royal on 13 April 1684 and was buried with her husband at St Gervais.

== Bibliography ==
- La Sphère de la lune composée de la tête de la femme (1992)
- Lettres et poésies de Madame la Comtesse de Brégy (1668)
- Les Œuvres galantes de Madame la comtesse de B. (de Brégy.) (1667)
- Les Lettres et poésies de Madame la Comtesse de B. (1666)
- La Sphere de la lune, composée de la teste de la femme (1658)
- Les Lettres et poésies with Charlotte Saumaize de Chazan Brégy (comtesse de, 1619–1693) as Autre
- Cinq Questions d'amour, proposées par Madame de Brégy, avec la réponse en vers par M. Quinault, par l'ordre du Roy
- Le Point du Jour, Air, gracieusement. (1770)
