= Charixene =

Ancient Greek musician and poet

Charixene, or Charixena (5th-century BC), was an Ancient Greek musician, poet and composer. She was a professional fluteplayer. She was active as a poet and achieved some fame, and Eustathios lists her among Sappho and Korinna as a woman poet worthy of praise. She also wrote erotic songs, and composed tunes for wind instruments. She was respected as an artist, but as a person, many comic poets of the time referred to her as stupid and naive, and her name became an expression of stupidity.
