= Jacquette Guillaume =

French writer (fl. 1655)

Jacquette Guillaume (fl. 1665) was a French writer.

Her best-known work was Les dames illustres, où par bonnes et fortes raisons il se prouve que le sexe féminin surpasse en toutes sortes de genres le sexe masculin, a work of 443 pages published by Thomas Jolly in Paris in 1665. Two copies of this book are believed to exist, in the Library of Congress and at Duke University. In this book she argues for the moral superiority of women over men. The book has been described as "a long-neglected, obscured contribution to the history of early French feminism", and was a source for Elizabeth Elstob's work which itself was a source for George Ballard's Memoirs of several ladies of Great Britain, who have been celebrated for their writings, or skill in the learned languages, arts and sciences (1752).

She also wrote a fictional work, La femme genereuse, of which no copies are known to survive.
