= Timycha =

Timycha of Sparta (Greek: Τιμύχα Λακεδαιμονία; early 4th century BC), was a Pythagorean philosopher mentioned by Iamblichus in his Life of Pythagoras:

The temperance also of those men, and how Pythagoras taught this virtue, may be learnt from what Hippobotus and Neanthes narrate of Myllias and Timycha who were Pythagoreans. For they say that Dionysius the tyrant could not obtain the friendship of any one of the Pythagoreans, though he did every thing to accomplish his purpose; for they had observed, and carefully avoided his monarchical disposition. He sent therefore to the Pythagoreans, a troop of thirty soldiers, under the command of Eurymenes the Syracusan, who was the brother of Dion, in order that by treachery their accustomed migration from Tarentum to Metapontum, might be opportunely effected for his purpose. For it was usual with them to change their abode at different seasons of the year, and they chose such places as were adapted to this migration. In Phalæ therefore, a craggy part of Tarentum, through which the Pythagoreans must necessarily pass in their journey, Eurymenes insidiously concealed his troop, and when the Pythagoreans, expecting no such thing, came to that place about the middle of the day, the soldiers rushed upon them with shouts, after the manner of robbers. But the Pythagoreans being disturbed and terrified at an attack so unexpected, and at the superior number of their enemies (for the whole number of the Pythagoreans was but ten), and considering also that they must be taken captive, as they were without arms, and had to contend with men who were variously armed,—they found that their only safety was in flight, and they did not conceive that this was foreign to virtue. For they knew that fortitude, according to the decision of right reason, is the science of things which are to be avoided and endured. And this they now obtained. For those who were with Eurymenes, being heavy-armed, would have abandoned the pursuit of the Pythagoreans, if the latter in their flight had not arrived at a certain field sown with beans, and which were in a sufficiently florishing condition. Not being willing therefore to violate the dogma which ordered them not to touch beans, they stood still, and from necessity attacked their pursuers with stones and sticks, and whatever else they happened to meet with, till they had slain some, and wounded many of them. All the Pythagoreans however, were at length slain by the spearmen, nor would any one of them suffer himself to be taken captive, but preferred death to this, conformably to the mandates of their sect. Eurymenes therefore, and his soldiers, were beyond measure disturbed on finding that they should not be able to bring one of the Pythagoreans alive to Dionysius, though they were sent by him for this purpose alone. Hence, having piled earth on the slain, and buried them in that place in a common sepulchre, they turned their steps homeward. As they were returning, however, they happened to meet with Myllias the Crotonian, and his wife Timycha the Lacedæmonian, whom the other Pythagoreans had left behind, because Timycha being pregnant, was now in her sixth month, and on this account walked leisurely. These therefore, the soldiers gladly made captive, and led them to the tyrant, paying every attention to them, in order that they might be brought to him safe. But the tyrant having learnt what had happened, was greatly dejected, and said to the two Pythagoreans, You shall obtain from me honors transcending all others in dignity, if you will consent to reign in conjunction with me. All his offers however being rejected by Myllias and Timycha; If then, said he, you will only teach me one thing, I will dismiss you with a sufficiently safe guard. Myllias therefore asking him what it was he wished to learn; Dionysius replied, It is this, why your companions chose rather to die, than to tread on beans? But Myllias immediately answered, My companions indeed submitted to death, in order that they might not tread upon beans, but I would rather tread on them, than tell you the cause of this. Dionysius therefore, being astonished at this answer, ordered him to be forcibly taken away, but commanded Timycha to be tortured: for he thought, that as she was a woman, pregnant, and deprived of her husband, she would easily tell him what he wanted to know, through fear of the torments. The heroic woman, however, grinding her tongue with her teeth, bit it off, and spit it at the tyrant; evincing by this, that though her sex being vanquished by the torments might be compelled to disclose something which ought to be concealed in silence, yet the member subservient to the development of it, should be entirely cut off. So much difficulty did they make 140 in admitting foreign friendships, even though they should happen to be royal.
