= Cornelia Adrichomia =

16th-century Dutch poet and nun

Cornelia Adrichomia was a 16th-century Dutch poet and nun of the Order of Saint Augustine. She published a poetical version of the book of Psalms, and wrote many other religious poems.
