= Marie Anne Barbier =

French playwright and writer

Marie-Anne Barbier (1670 or 21 January 1664 – 1745) was a French writer.

The daughter of Jacques Barbier and Marie Sinson, she was born in Orléans, Orléanais. She later left there for Paris. Barbier wrote in collaboration with the abbé Simon-Joseph Pellegrin. In 1702, she wrote her first play Arrie et Petus, a tragedy. That was followed by the tragedies Cornélie, mère des Gracques in 1703, Tomyris, Reine des MaiTagetes in 1707 and La Mort de César in 1709. In 1719, Barbier wrote Le Faucon, a comedy in one act. She also wrote two operas: Fêtes de l’été and Le Jugement de Pâris and Les Plaisirs de la campagne, a ballet.

She published a literary periodical Saisons littéraires which contained critical reviews of theatre.

Barbier died in Paris.
