= Elizabeth Fane =

English writer and literary patron (c.1510 -1568)

- Born: Elizabeth Brydges c. 1510
- Died: 1568; Holborn
- Occupations: writer and patron

Lady Elizabeth Fane born Elizabeth Brydges (c. 1510 – 1568) was an English writer and literary patron.

== Life ==
She was born in about 1510, the daughter of Rouland Brugge, died 1540, and Margery Kelom.

She married Ralph Vane and in 1550 they were given Penshurst Place by the King. Her husband was executed for plotting to kill John Dudley, 1st Duke of Northumberland in February 1552. Penshurst Place was given to Sir William Sidney their household goods in their house at Westminster went to Sir John Gate, a follower of Northumberland.

She was in a weak position and when Queen Mary came to power she had many Protestants arrested. She risked her own freedom and life by offering the prisoners support.

John Strype states that Fane was a "liberal benefactor" to Protestants under Queen Mary and corresponded with Philpot and John Bradford. Her 12 Certaine Psalms of Godly Meditation (1550) contains 102 proverbs. It was published by Robert Crowley, who went into exile about 1552.

Lady Fane was described by John Foxe as a "a speciall Nourse and a great supporter [within] her power of the godly Saintes, which were imprisoned in Q[ueen] Marie's time." She died in Holborn, London, in 1568.
