= Damophila =

Ancient Greek poetess

Damophila, also spelled Damophyle (Ancient Greek: Δαμοφύλη; fl. 611-610 BC) was, according to the second-century AD sophist Philostratus, an ancient Greek poetess and companion of Sappho. She may have been an invention of Philostratus, the only surviving ancient source to mention her.

== Biography ==
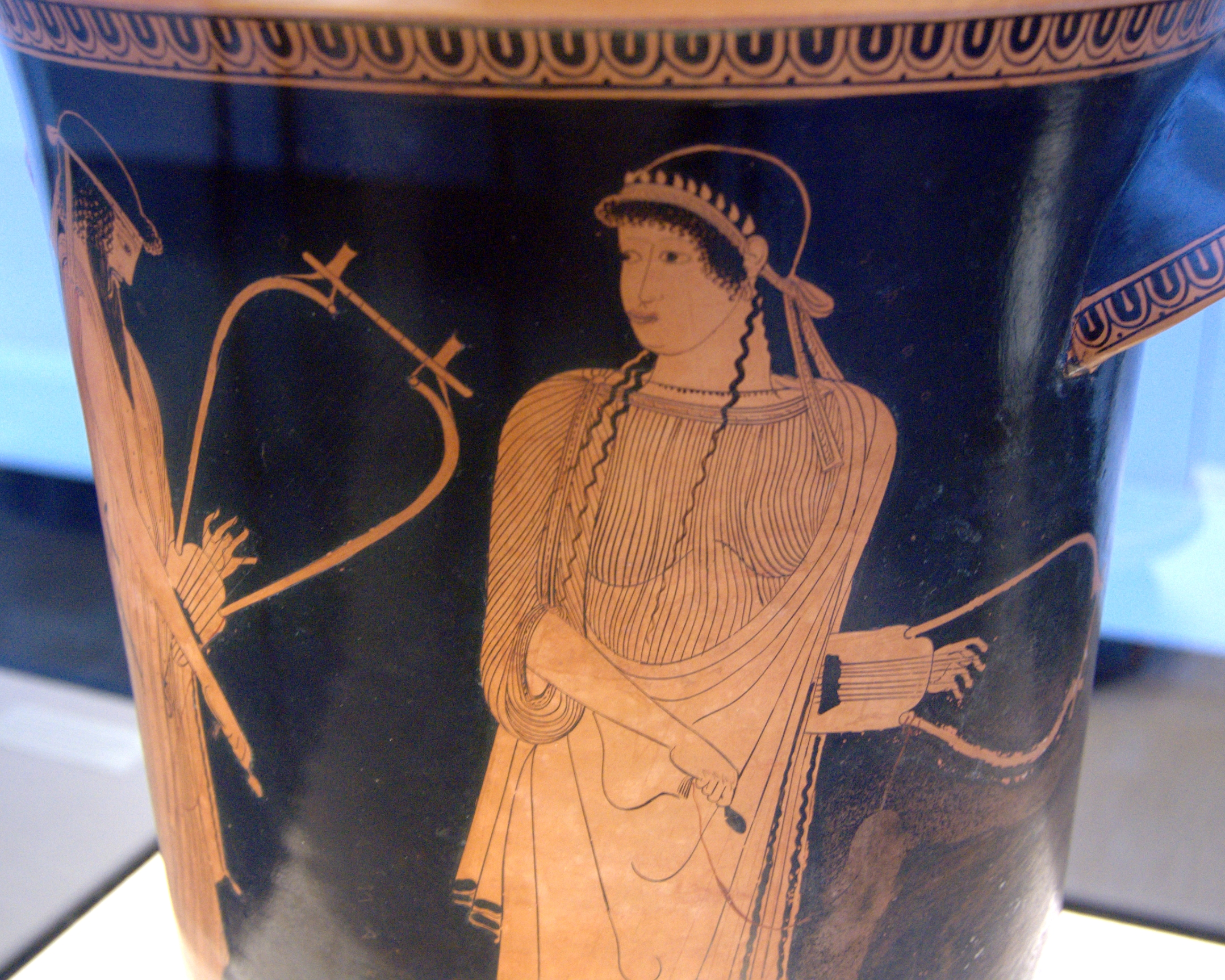
Sappho listening to Alcaeus, on vase, c. 470 BC

She may have been from Pamphylia. She has been variously described as a companion, intimate, friend, or imitator of Sappho. Philostratus described her as "skilful".

Following Sappho's example (under whom she had studied at Lesbos, and was called her protégée), she held assemblies to teach young women poetry and music; probably in Pamphylia. She was married to Pamphilus (first mentioned by Fulgoso in 1521), or Damophilus, a philosopher.

=== Existence ===
In extant ancient sources, she is only once attested by Philostratus (in Life of Apollonius of Tyana), as such, doubts of her existence have been raised. It was later suggested that Philostratus got his account of her from David the Syrian (possibly referring to Damis).

== Poetry ==
Her poetry was in the form of hymns, and often erotic or of the passion love. She emulated a hymn by Sappho, directed to the worship of Artemis (sometimes referred to by the Roman equivalent Diana); Karl Otfried Müller described it as blending the Æolic and Pamphylic styles. None of her poems have survived.

== Legacy ==
In 1832, John Curtis used the name for the moth Damophila trifolii. It was later used (alongside names such as Nymphae, Lesbiinae, and Heliantheinae) by Ludwig Reichenbach in 1854 for Damophila Julie; which was renamed Neodamophila.

Her name was later used by Pierre Louÿs; being turned into Damophylus, the father of his invented Sapphic contemporary Bilitis.
