= Marie Bruneau des Loges =

French Salon holder

- Born: 1584; Troyes
- Died: 1 June 1641 (aged 56–57); Château de Laplaud, Oradour-sur-Glane, Haute-Vienne
- Known for: Salon holder

Marie Bruneau des Loges (1584 – 1 June 1641), was a French salon holder.

== Biography ==
She was the youngest daughter of Huguenot Sébastien Bruneau. Her father was wealthy and moved to Paris, when he became secretary to the King Henry IV. Des Loges moved to La Rochelle with him when he retired. He moved to avoid persecution as a Huguenot.

Des Loges married Charles de Rechignevoisin, lord of a noble family from Poitou. She began to hold salons in 1603 where her charm and spirit made her a celebrity in Paris. Her salons were popular and she was well loved in court. While des Loges was a popular figure under Louis XIII, she got caught up in the court intrigues around Gaston, Duke of Orléans. She moved out of Paris in 1629 due to an order from Cardinal Richelieu. She moved with her eldest daughter who had married M. d'Oradour. Des Loges did not come back to Paris until 1636. She had two sons die in battle, one in 1620 at the Battle of Prague and the other in 1637 at the siege of Breda.
