= Leaena =

Hetaera (0600-0500)

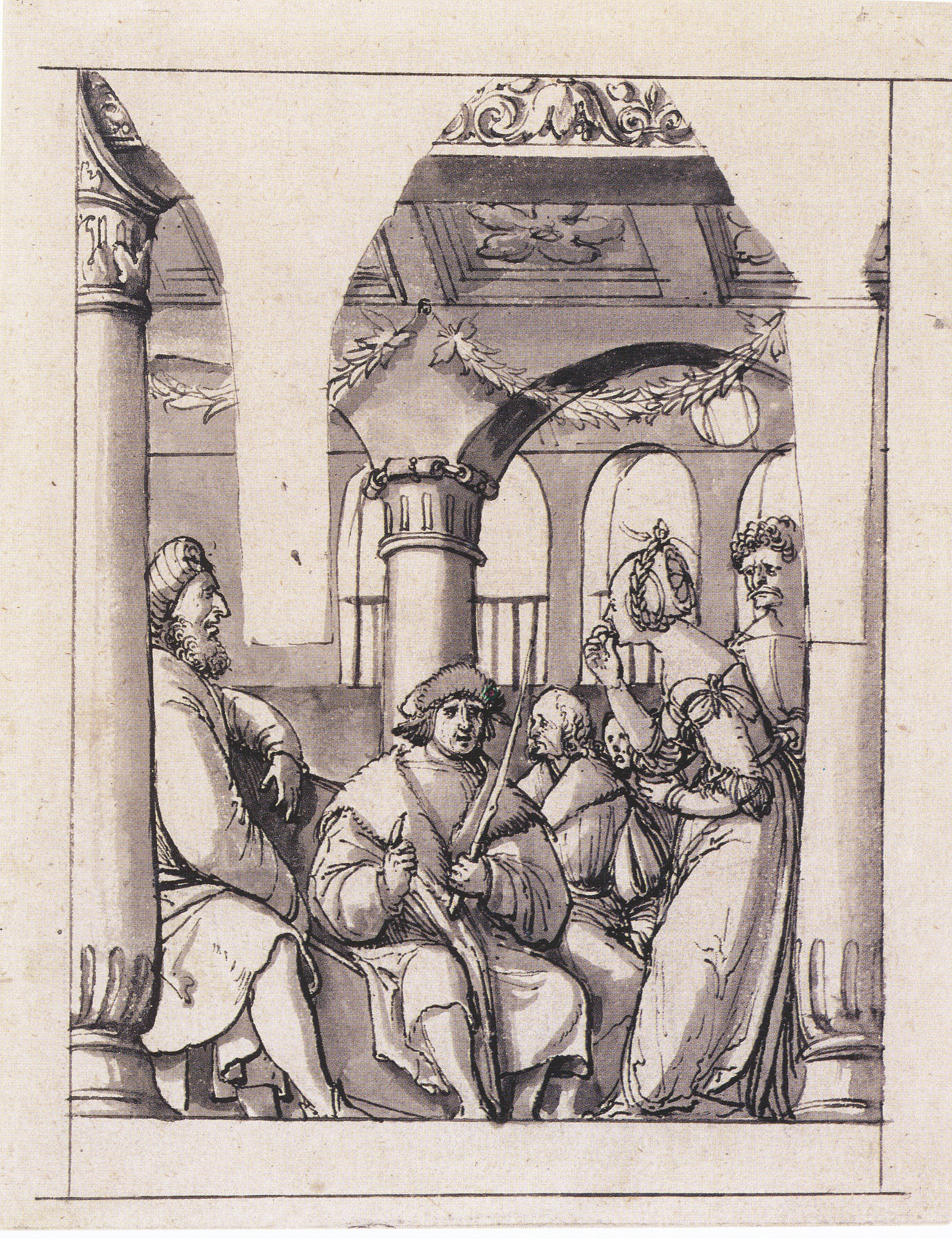
Leaina Before the Judges, by Hans Holbein the Younger, c. 1517–18

Leaena (Ancient Greek: Λέαινα, "lioness") is a pseudo-historical figure, described by later tradition as a hetaera and the mistress of Aristogeiton the Tyrannicide.

Original versions of the story of Aristogeiton portray him, on the contrary, as the lover of Harmodius, for whom he decided to overthrow the tyrant Hipparchus. Hipparchus had feelings for Harmodius, and he tried to humiliate him after his feelings were rejected.

In 514 B.C., Harmodius and Aristogeiton, a male couple, overthrew Hippias and Hipparchus at Athens. Hipparchus was murdered, but Hippias escaped, and seized the surviving conspirators. According to later versions of the story, told among others by Plutarch, the hetaera Leaena, lover of Aristogeiton, or Harmodius, or both, was captured. Leaena was tortured to get information about the conspiracy.

Leaena was commemorated on account of her stubborn resolve under the torture of the tyrant. Athenaeus (who believed Leaena's lover was Harmodius) says: "There was also a courtesan named Leaena, whose name is very celebrated, and she was the mistress of Harmodius, who slew the tyrant. And she, being tortured by command of Hippias the tyrant, died under the torture without having said a word."

According to Jerome, Leaena rose to the occasion even further; to preserve her silence, and to frustrate her torturers, she bit her tongue off, and so died: "Harmodius and Aristogiton killed the tyrant Hipparchus, and the courtesan Leaena their friend, when compelled with torments, lest she betray her companions, she amputated her tongue with her teeth."

Therefore, the brass lioness statue at the entrance to the Acropolis was without a tongue: "And Leaena also has a splendid reward for her self-control. She was a courtesan belonging to the group led by Harmodius and Aristogeiton and shared in the conspiracy against the tyrants — with her hopes, all a woman could do; for she also had joined in the revels about that noble mixing-bowl of Eros and through the god had been initiated into the secrets which might not be revealed. When, therefore, the conspirators failed and were put to death, she was questioned and commanded to reveal those who still escaped detection; but she would not do so and continued steadfast, proving that those men had experienced a passion not unworthy of themselves in loving a woman like her. And the Athenians caused a bronze lioness without a tongue to be made and set up at the Propylaea in the Acropolis of Athens, representing by the spirited courage of the animal Leaena's invincible character, and by its tonguelessness her power of silence in keeping a holy secret."

The statue was not made by Calamis but by the Athenian sculptor Amphicrates, according to Pliny.

It is possible that Leaena's story, replacing the account of Harmodius and Aristogeiton as a couple, was invented to explain the existence of the lioness statue with the missing tongue, or perhaps to accommodate the homophobia of writers from late antiquity.

== See also ==
- Courtesan
