= Aldruda Frangipane =

Roman noblewoman

- Born: after 1120
- Died: after October 1173
- Occupations: Roman noblewoman and military leader

Aldruda Frangipane, Countess of Bertinoro, (after 1120 – after October 1173) was a Roman noblewoman and military leader. She was the regent of the County of Bertinoro during the minority of her son Cavalcaconte from 1152.

Aldruda is believed to have belonged to the Frangipane family of Rome. She was probably born soon after 1120, but there is no record of her until 1142, when Gualtiero, the archbishop of Ravenna, declared that he was willing to renew the investiture of the castle of Bertinoro to Rainerio di Cavalcaconte on condition that he marry a Frangipane. The marriage probably took place in 1142.

In a document dated 29 December 1153, Pope Celestino II granted rights in the fief of Bertinoro to Pietro degli Onesti, tutor to the children of Rainerio – who by then had died – and "Boltruda", presumed to be Aldruda; among the witnesses to the document are Oddone and Cencio Frangipane. According to this document, at this time Aldruda had a young son, Cavalcaconte, and was expecting another.

Aldruda appears with her sons Cavalcaconte and Rainerio in two deeds of donation dated 31 July 1152 and June 1153. She continued to govern Bertinoro even after Cavalcaconte reached the age of majority, maintaining a court of some magnificence. Cavalcaconte died in Venice in 1177; after 1153 nothing more is known of Rainerio.

In October 1173 Aldruda led the forces of Bertinoro in the army that relieved the city of Ancona, under siege by troops of the Holy Roman Emperor Frederick Barbarossa under archbishop Christian of Mainz.

In a panegyric to the Byzantine emperor Manuel Komnenos written in 1174, the archbishop Eustathios of Thessaloniki praises the people of Ancona, describing the events of the siege and the part played by Aldruda. Her participation in the relief of the siege is described by Boncompagno da Signa in his Liber de Obsidione Ancone of 1201.

There is no further document of her life after the siege.

== Bibliography ==
- Henry Gardiner Adams, ed. (1857). "Aldrude". A Cyclopaedia of Female Biography: 29. Wikidata Q115584572.
