= Poems by Eminent Ladies =

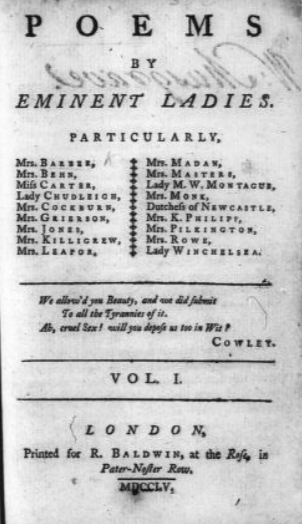
- Title page for Poems by Eminent Ladies (1755)
- Editor: George Colman, Bonnell Thornton
- Language: English
- Genre: poetry
- Published: London
- Publisher: R. Baldwin
- Publication date: 1755
- Publication place: England
- Media type: print
- Pages: viii, [2], 3-316p.
- OCLC: 461463666

Poems by Eminent Ladies (1755) is one of the first anthologies of women's writing in English. It was edited by George Colman (1732–1794) and Bonnell Thornton (1725–1768).

== The first edition ==
The first edition comprises works by eighteen poets born between 1623 and 1722. Roughly half the pieces were written in the late seventeenth century, and the rest in the first half of the eighteenth. The poems are arranged alphabetically by author, an innovative format, for while both collections and collective biographies were popular, "the conflation of verse miscellany and encyclopedia or memoir was almost unheard of". Chantel Lavoie has described this anthology as "the first attempt to determine and justify a canon of women's writings". and notes that Colman and Thornton were friends to John Duncombe, author of The Feminiad (1754), a poetic celebration of women writers.

== The second edition ==
Colman, as surviving partner, published a considerably expanded edition in 1785, in partial response, it has been conjectured, to the absence of women writers in Samuel Johnson's extensive Lives of the Poets (1779–81). This new edition includes a greater number of poets while offering fewer texts per poet. All the newly added writers produced their work in the mid- to late-eighteenth century, some of them years after the first edition was published.

== Significance and context ==
The poets represented in Poems by Eminent Ladies are diverse in terms of literary reputation and degree of critical and commercial success, literary school or style, and social, economic, and cultural background. Together, they help the editors make a case for including women writers in the national literary tradition: "The Ladies, whose pieces we have here collected, are not only an honour to their sex, but to their country."

Poems by Eminent Ladies was only the first of "multiple attempts to promote and anthologize women writers as important members of the national literary tradition," part of what scholar Moira Ferguson calls an "eruption of female panegyrics," mainly by men, that includes George Ballard's Memoirs of British Ladies (biographies of sixty-five notable women; 1752); Theophilus Cibber's Lives of the Poets (1753); Thomas Amory's Memoirs of Several Ladies of Great Britain (1755); and Biographium faemineum: the female worthies, or, Memoirs of the most illustrious ladies, of all ages and nations, who have been eminently distinguished for their magnanimity, learning, genius, virtue, piety, and other excellent endowments. London: Printed for S. Crowder, 1766. 2 vols. (Anon; 1766).

== Poets ==
=== Writers included in the 1st (1755) edition ===
- Mary Barber
- Aphra Behn
- Margaret Cavendish
- Elizabeth Carter
- Mary Chudleigh
- Catherine Cockburn
- Anne Finch
- Constantia Grierson
- Mary Jones
- Anne Killigrew
- Mary Leapor
- Judith Madan
- Mary Masters
- Mary Monck
- Mary Wortley Montague
- Katherine Philips
- Letitia Pilkington
- Elizabeth Singer Rowe

=== Writers added to the 1780 edition ===
- Anna Laetitia Barbauld
- Frances Brooke
- Sally Carter
- Hester Chapone
- Mary Collier
- Frances Greville (with a response from Isabella Howard, Countess of Carlisle)
- Mary Hays
- Charlotte Lennox
- Elizabeth Pennington
- Jael Pye
- Eliza Roberts (fl. 1780-1788)
- Mary Savage (fl. 1763-1777)
- Mary Scott
- Hester Lynch Piozzi
- Elizabeth Sophia Tomlins
- Mary Whateley (later Darwall)

== Etexts ==
- Colman, George, the Elder, and Bonnell Thornton, eds. Poems by Eminent Ladies. London: R. Baldwin, 1755. (Extext of Vol. II, HathiTrust)
- Poems by the most eminent ladies of Great Britain and Ireland. Re-published from the collection of G. Colman and B. Thornton, Esqrs., with considerable alterations, additions, and improvements. London: W. Stafford, 1785. (Etext, Internet Archive)

== See also ==
- Collective 18th-century biographies of literary women
- The Feminead
- Specimens of British Poetesses
- Women's writing (literary category)

== Notes and references ==
=== References ===
- Lavoie, Chantel Michelle. Poems by Eminent Ladies: A study of an eighteenth-century anthology (thesis). Toronto: University of Toronto, 1999. ISBN 9780612498839, 0612498832 (PDF)
- Lonsdale, Roger. Introduction to the 2006 edition of Johnson's "Lives" (Clarendon Press)
