= Specimens of British Poetesses =

1825 anthology of poems

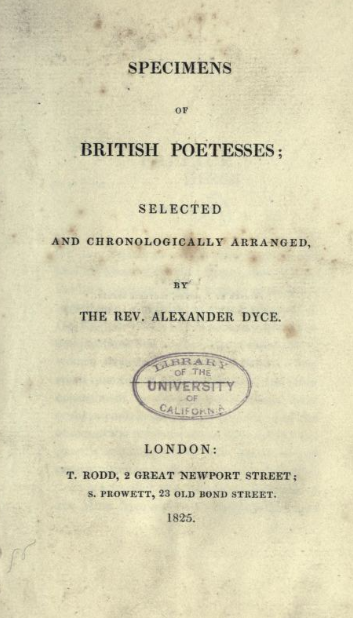
- Title page for Specimens of British Poetesses; selected and chronologically arranged (1825)
- Editor: Alexander Dyce
- Language: English
- Genre: poetry
- Published: London
- Publisher: T. Rodd, S. Prowett
- Publication date: 1825
- Publication place: England
- Media type: print
- Pages: xvi, 446 p.
- OCLC: 379022218

Specimens of British Poetesses; selected and chronologically arranged (1825) by Alexander Dyce is an anthology of verse jointly published in London by Thomas Rodd and Septimus Prowett, near the beginning of Dyce's long career as a literary critic, editor, and historian. It was not the first published anthology of poetry by British women writers — that may have been Poems by Eminent Ladies 2 Vols. (London: R. Baldwin, 1755) — but it was the most comprehensive to date: encompassing 446 pages, it includes 196 poems or excerpts from longer pieces by eighty-nine (89) writers written between approximately 1460 and 1821. In the preface, Dyce highlights some of the issues that continue to concern researchers of women's writing, in particular, identifying them: among the eighty-nine he includes the work of four anonymous authors, and many of the brief biographical notes with which he introduces each writer are sparse or in some cases absent altogether. He writes, "we feel an honest satisfaction in the reflection, that our tedious chase through the jungles of forgotten literature must procure to this undertaking the good-will of our country-women....[O]ur work will never be deprived of the happy distinction of being one of the first that has been entirely consecrated to women."

One commentator has called Specimens "an impressively varied collection" that "exemplifies the remarkably catholic taste" of the editor. The collection was well received by literary luminaries William Wordsworth and Leigh Hunt, and was well-reviewed in The Literary Gazette. There was a second printing, by Thomas Rodd alone, in 1827. The British Library reprinted an edition in 2011.

== Writers named (in alphabetical order) ==
- Anne Askew
- Joanna Baillie
- Anna Laetitia Barbauld
- Mary Barber
- Anne Barnard
- Aphra Behn
- Juliana Berners
- Anne Boleyn
- Frances Boothby
- Anne Bradstreet
- Jane Brereton
- Frances Brooke
- Mary Brunton
- Elizabeth Carter
- Elizabeth Cary
- Georgiana Cavendish
- Margaret Cavendish
- Anne Cecil
- Susanna Centlivre
- Anna Chamber
- Mary Chandler
- Hester Chapone
- Mary Chudleigh
- Alison Cockburn
- Catherine Cockburn
- An Collins
- Hannah Cowley
- Alicia D'Anvers
- Jean Elliot
- Mary Fage
- Anne Finch
- Anne Grant
- Frances Greville
- Constantia Grierson
- Eliza Haywood
- Felicia Hemans
- Margaret Holford
- Anne Howard
- Anna Hume
- Anne Hunter
- Mary Jones
- Esther Johnson
- Anne Killigrew
- Henrietta Knight
- Letitia Elizabeth Landon
- Mary Leapor
- Judith Madan
- Delarivier Manley
- Mary Masters
- Elizabeth Melville
- Mary Russell Mitford
- Mary Monck
- Mary Wortley Montague
- Hannah More
- Henrietta O'Neill
- Amelia Opie
- Katherine Philips
- Letitia Pilkington
- Hester Lynch Piozzi
- Mary Pix
- Eleanor Anne Porden
- Diana Primrose
- Ann Radcliffe
- Mary Robinson
- Elizabeth Singer Rowe
- Rachel Russell
- Miss Scott of Ancram
- Anna Seward
- Frances Sheridan
- Mary Sidney
- Charlotte Smith
- Elizabeth Stuart
- Elizabeth Taylor
- Gertrude Thimelby
- Elizabeth Thomas
- Mary Tighe
- Elizabeth Tollet
- Elizabeth Trefusis
- Elizabeth Tudor
- Helen Maria Williams
- Mary Wroth
- Ann Yearsley

== Etext ==
- Dyce, Alexander, ed. Specimens of British Poetesses; selected and chronologically arranged, by the Rev. Alexander Dyce. London: T. Rodd and S. Prowett, 1825. (Etext, Internet Archive; Etext, HathiTrust)
