= The Female Advocate =

1775 work by Mary Scott

The Female Advocate; a poem occasioned by reading Mr. Duncombe's Feminead
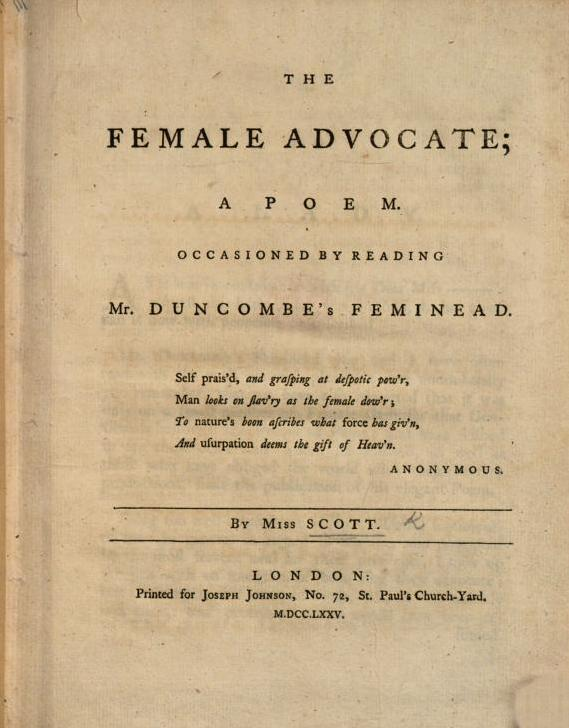
- Title page of Mary Scott's The Female Advocate (1775)
- Author: Mary Scott
- Subject: literary women
- Genre: poetry
- Published: London
- Publisher: Joseph Johnson
- Publication date: 1775
- Pages: viii+41 pp.
- Website: Google Books

Mary Scott's The Female Advocate; a poem occasioned by reading Mr. Duncombe's Feminead (1775) is both a celebration of women's literary achievements, as well as an impassioned piece of advocacy for women's right to literary self-expression.

== The poem ==
The Female Advocate takes John Duncombe's The Feminead: or, female genius. A poem (1754) as its inspiration. Scott expresses gratitude and admiration for Duncombe, then justifies her own project with her stated wish to expand his original list of "female geniuses", as well as to include some of those who came to prominence since he wrote (page v).

Duncombe's poem is celebratory; it rehearses the accomplishments of women writers of the mid-eighteenth-century. Scott cast further back in time in order to "tell what bright daughters BRITAIN once could boast" (l. 25) and introduces a series of women from the previous two centuries that would have already been familiar to most of her readers, beginning with the learned Protestant sixth wife of Henry VIII, Catherine Parr. She continues chronologically into the quarter-century between when Duncombe's poem was published two decades earlier and the time of her own writing. Her poem combines the tradition of the catalogue of exemplary women that Duncombe follows, with that of another genre that would also have been familiar to her readers: the defence of women.

Scott's poem consists of 522 lines of heroic couplets. It is dedicated to her close friend, Mary Steele, and contains several references to people within their circle.

== Names ==
Pastoral pseudonyms, or noms de plumes, were popular in the eighteenth century, and Scott uses them in this poem, both widely known ones such as "Orinda" for Katherine Philips, as well as pen names employed in a more limited way, within her own circle. Female writers often published anonymously. Scott includes two anonymous writers in the body of the poem and mentions a third in the introduction.

== Literary figures treated in The Female Advocate ==
=== In the introduction ===
In the introduction, Scott mentions four writers who had "started up since the writing of this little piece": Hester Chapone (1727–1801), Hannah More, Phillis Wheatley, and the unnamed author of "poems by a lady" "lately published" by G. Robinson in Paternoster Row. She implies that there is no shortage of subjects: "Authors have appeared with honour, in almost every walk of literature."

=== In the poem ===
1. Catherine Parr (1512–1548): queen consort and author of three works
2. Jane Grey (1537–1554): reputation for excellent humanist education
3. Elizabeth Tudor (1533–1603): monarch and sometime poet
4. Margaret Roper (née More; 1505–1544)
5. Elizabeth Dauncey (née More; 1506–1564)
6. Cecily Heron (née More; born 1507–?)
7. Mary Basset (née Roper; also Clarke; c. 1523 – 1572)
8. Anne Seymour (later Dudley; 1538–1588)
9. Margaret Seymour (b. 1540)
10. Jane Seymour (1541–1561)
11. Anne Bacon (née Cooke; 1528–1610)
12. Elizabeth Russell (née Cooke; 1528–1609)
13. Mildred Cooke (1526–1589)
14. Catherine Killigrew (née Cooke; c. 1530 – 1583)
15. Margaret Rowlett (née Cooke; d. 1558), sister of Ann Bacon, Mildred Cooke, Elizabeth Russell
16. Margaret Cavendish (née Lucas; c. 1624 – 1674): philosopher, poet, scientist, fiction writer, playwright
17. Anne Killigrew (1660–1685): poet and painter
18. Katherine Philips (née Fowler; 1631/2 – 1664): poet; also included in Duncombe's The Feminead
19. Rachel Russell (née Wriothesley; c. 1636 – 1723): known for her published correspondence
20. Mary Monck (née Molesworth; 1677? – 1715): poet
21. Mary Chudleigh (née Lee; August 1656–1710): feminist poet and intellectual
22. Constantia Grierson (née Crawley; c. 1705 – 1732): editor, poet, classical scholar
23. Mary Barber (c. 1685 – c. 1755): poet
24. Mary Chandler (1687–1745): poet
25. Mary Jones (1707–1778): poet
26. Mary Masters (1698? – 1761?): anthologist/biographer
27. Elizabeth Cooper (née Price; 1698? – 1761?): noted by Scott for her edited anthology of poetry, The Muse's Library, with which she "did'st pierce the shades of gothic night" by collecting poetry of earlier periods (l. 235)
28. Sarah Fielding (1710–1768): novelist
29. Elizabeth Tollet (1694–1754): poet, philosopher, and translator
30. Charlotte Lennox (née Ramsay; c. 1730 – 1804): novelist, playwright, poet
31. Elizabeth Griffith (1727–1793): dramatist, fiction writer, essayist
32. Anne Steele / "Theodosia" (1717–1778): hymn writer and essayist; not openly named in the poem; centre of Scott's own literary circle and aunt of Mary Steele, to whom The Female Advocate is dedicated
33. Frances Greville (née Macartney; c. 1724 – 1789): poet
34. Mary Whateley (later Darwall; 1738–1825): poet and playwright
35. Catharine Macaulay (née Sawbridge; 1731–1791): historian
36. Anna Williams (1706–1783): poet
37. Sarah Pennington (née Moore; c. 1720 – 1783): author of conduct literature
38. Elizabeth Montagu (née Robinson; 1718–1800): patron of the arts, salonnière, literary critic, writer, Blue Stocking
39. Dorothea Celesia (bap. 1738, died 1790): poet, playwright, translator
40. Catherine Talbot (1721–1770): essayist and Blue Stocking
41. Rose Roberts (1730–1788): not openly named in the poem
42. Jael Pye (née Mendez; c. 1737 – 1782): author of four works; not openly named in the poem
43. Anna Laetitia Barbauld (née Aikin; 1743–1825): poet, essayist, literary critic, editor, author of children's literature
44. John Duncombe (writer) (1729–1786): author of The Feminead (1754)
45. Thomas Seward (1708–1790): author of The Female Right to Literature, in a Letter to a Young Lady from Florence (1766)
46. Anna Seward / "Athenia" (1742–1809): poet; mentioned by Scott as the beneficiary of Thomas Seward's progressive ideas about female education
47. William Steele IV / "Philander" (1715–1785): Mary Steele's father

=== In the footnotes ===
1. Katherine Grey (1540–1568)
2. Mary Sidney (later Herbert; 1561–1621): poet
3. Laetitia Pilkington (c. 1709 – 1750): poet; included in Duncombe's The Feminead

== See also ==
- Collective 18th-century biographies of literary women
- The Feminead
- The Unsex'd Females

== Electronic text ==
- Full text at Scott, Mary. The Female Advocate; a poem occasioned by reading Mr. Duncombe's Feminead (London: Joseph Johnson, 1775). Google Books
