= Elizabeth Taylor (poet) =

British poet

- Died: 5 February 1708
- Occupation: Poet
- Spouse(s): Francis Wythens, Sir Thomas Culpeper, 3rd Baronet
- Father: Sir Thomas Taylor, 1st Bt.
- Relatives: Sir Thomas Taylor

Elizabeth Taylor (died 5 February 1708) was a British poet of the Restoration period.

Taylor was the daughter of Sir Thomas Taylor, 1st Baronet, and Elizabeth Hall.

Her ode, "Ah poor Olinda never boast", told from the point of view of a young woman, appeared in two songbooks: A Collection of Twenty Four Songs (1684) and The Theater of Music (1685). Delarivier Manley reprinted it in 1708 in her The New Atalantis and described Taylor as "the wittiest Lady of the Age." Aphra Behn published "To Mertill who desired her to speak to Clorinda of his Love" and two other poems by Taylor, all of which feature women who suffered in love, in Miscellany, Being a Collection of Poems by Several Hands (1685). Taylor is the only woman author in the miscellany credited by name.

In May 1685 Taylor married Sir Francis Wythens, a fifty year old judge and politician. The marriage was unhappy. She had an affair with Sir Thomas Culpeper, 3rd Baronet, and began spending extravagantly, apparently in order to bankrupt Wythens. Wythens unsuccessfully sued Culpeper for assault as a result of a beating from Taylor's brother, Sir Thomas Taylor, 2nd Baronet, alleging Culpeper had prevented a servant from coming to Wythens' aid. Culpeper, however, successfully sued for financial support after Taylor and her children moved in with Culpeper. Wythens died in May 1704, and Taylor and Culpeper married in August 1704.

Elizabeth Taylor died on 5 February 1708.

Over a century later, her work was anthologized in Specimens of British Poetesses (1825).
