= Constantia Grierson =

Irish editor and poet

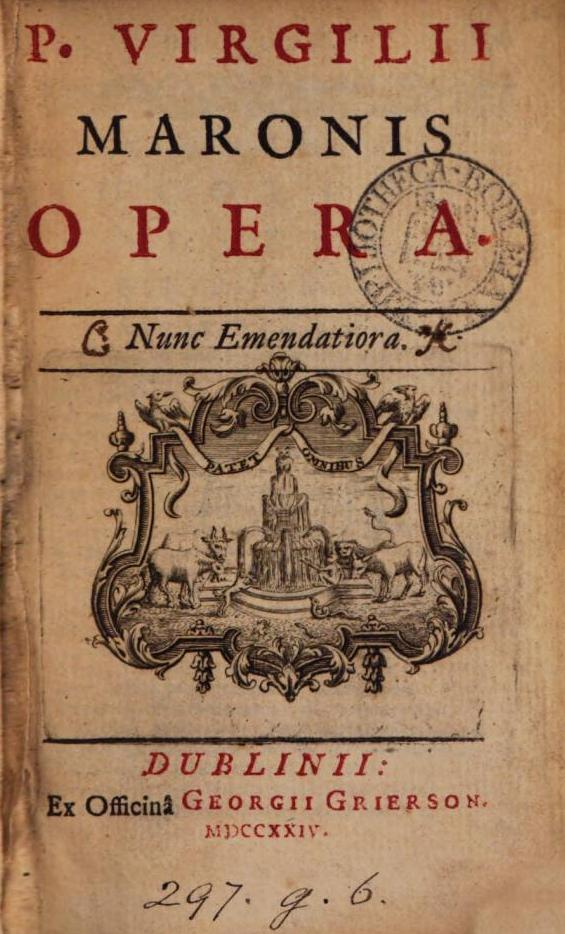
- Title page of Constantia Grierson's edition of Publius Virgilius Maro, P.V.M. opera. Nunc emendatiora (Dublin: G. Grierson, 1724) (Google Play)
- Born: Constantia Crawley; 1705; Kilkenny
- Died: 2 December 1732 (aged 26–27); Dublin
- Resting place: St. John's Parish Church, Drumcondra, Dublin, Ireland
- Education: autodidact
- Occupations: editor, poet, and classical scholar
- Spouse: George Grierson (c.1679–1753)
- Children: George Abraham Grierson (c.1727-55)

Constantia Grierson (née Crawley; c. 1705 – 2 December 1732), was an editor, poet, and classical scholar from County Kilkenny, Ireland.

== Life ==
Constantia Crawley was born to an impoverished rural family in County Kilkenny. Her parents recognized her intelligence at an early age and encouraged her desire to learn. She was tutored in Hebrew, Greek, Latin, English, and French by her local vicar, but was mostly self-educated. According to one editor she was "a most excellent scholar, not only in Greek and Roman literature, but in history, divinity, philosophy, and mathematics: and what makes her character the more remarkable is, that she died so early as the age of 27, and that she acquired this great learning merely by the force of her own genius, and continual application." Laetitia Pilkington felt "her Learning appeared like the Gift poured out of the Apostles, of speaking all languages without the Pains of Study; or, like the intuitive Knowledge of Angels."

At about eighteen Crawley moved to Dublin and began to study midwifery under Dr. Van Lewen, a Dutch physician and the father of Laetitia Pilkington. She ceased her studies when she met printer and publisher George Grierson (c.1679–1753) for whom she edited many works. The date of their marriage is unrecorded. By 1727 she had edited titles in the pocket classics edition, including Terence's Comediae, to which she prefixed a Greek epigram from her own pen, inscribing it to Robert, son of Lord Carteret; in 1730 she edited the work of Tacitus, inscribing it to Lord Carteret himself.

Jonathan Swift was so impressed with her editing that he wrote to Alexander Pope on 6 February 1730: "She is a very good Latin and Greek scholar, and hath lately published a fine edition of Tacitus, and she writes carmina Anglicana non-contemnenda." The edition was also much praised by the classical scholar Edward Harwood and "her editions of Terence and Tacitus printed by Grierson were to be favoured by scholars for many generations."

Grierson played an important role in her husband's business and household, which included apprentices and journeymen as well as domestic servants. Highly regarded by Dublin's literary élite for her gifts as an editor as well as a poet, and for her remarkable memory, women from the landed gentry of Ireland were attracted to her and became some of her husband's most valued customers. Her husband emphasised her contributions in his successful petition to the Irish House of Commons in 1729 to be granted the patent for King's Printer: "the Editions corrected by her have been approved of, not only in this Kingdom, but in Great Britain, Holland and elsewhere, and the Art of Printing, through her care and assistance, has been brought to greater perfection than has been hitherto in this Kingdom."

In addition to her editorial work she was a poet. Little of her poetry survives, although her friend Mary Barber published six of her pieces in her Poems on Several Occasions (1734). Those six and two others, included by Laetitia Pilkington in her Memoirs, were published in Poems by the Most Eminent Ladies of Great Britain and Ireland. Jonathan Swift included her, along with Barber and literary critic Elizabeth Sican, in his "triumfeminate" and she was part of his Dublin literary circle.

After a period of frail health, Grierson died at the age of twenty-seven, possibly of tuberculosis, and was buried in Drumcondra, County Dublin.

Her reputation was enhanced by being included by George Ballard in his Memoirs of Several Ladies of Great Britain, who have been Celebrated for their Writings or Still in the Learned Languages, Arts and Sciences (1752). More than four decades after her death, she was praised in The Female Advocate (1775), Mary Scott's poem in praise of women writers and intellectuals.

== Works ==
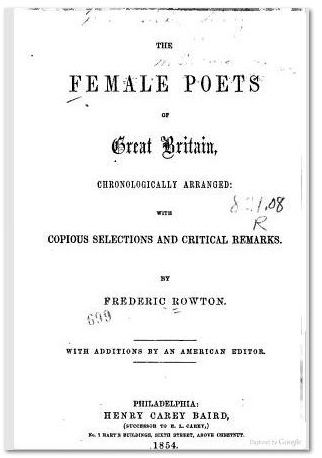
Female Poets of Great Britain, Rowton

=== Editing ===
- Publius Virgilius Maro, P.V.M. opera. Nunc emendatiora, (ed.) (Dublin: G. Grierson, 1724).
- Publius Afer Terentius, P. Terentii Afri Comoediae ad optimorum exemplarium fidem recensitae. Praefixa sunt huic editioni Loca Menandri et Apollodori quae Terentius Latine interpretatus est. Accesserunt emendationes omnes Bentleianae. Editio novissima (ed.) (Dublin: G. Grierson, 1727).
- Publius Cornelius Tacitus, C. Cornelii Taciti Opera quae extant ex recensione et cum animadversionibus T. Ryckii. T. Ryckii de Vita et Morte Sigani Oratio, 3 vols. (ed.) (Dublin: G. Grierson, 1730).
- Sallust (unfinished)

=== Poetry ===
- "Poems on Several Occasions", Poems, ed. Mary Barber (London: Printed for the author, 1734)
- Grierson, Constantia (1773), "Poems by Mrs. Constantia Grierson", in Colman, G.; Thornton, B. (eds.), Poems by the most eminent ladies of Great-Britain and Ireland, vol. I (A new ed.), London: printed for T. Becket and Co. and T. Evans, near York building, Strand., p. 240, archived from the original on 25 May 2007.
- The Poetry of Laetitia Pilkington (1712-1750) and Constantia Grierson (1706-1733), ed. Bernard Tucker (Lewiston, NY: Edward Mellen Press, 1996).

== See also ==
- List of 18th-century British working-class writers

== Resources ==
- Backscheider, Paula. "Inverting the Image of Swift's 'Triumfeminate'." Journal for Early Modern Cultural Studies Vol. 4, No. 1, Women Writers of the Eighteenth Century (Spring/Summer 2004), pp. 37–71. JSTOR. Accessed 9 Sep. 2022. <https://www.jstor.org/stable/27793777>
- Ballard, George (1752), "Memoirs of Constantia Grierson.", Memoirs of several ladies of Great Britain: who have been celebrated for their writings or skill in the learned languages, arts and sciences, Oxford: Printed by W, Jackson, for the author, pp. 461–464.
- Cibber, Theophilus; Shiells, Robert; Coxeter, Thomas (1753), "Mrs. Constantia Grierson", The Lives of the Poets of Great Britain and Ireland, vol. V, London: Printed for R. Griffiths at the Dunciad in St. Paul's Church Yard, pp. 72–74, ISBN 9781419170430, archived from the original on 3 September 2004.
- Clarke, Norma (2009), Queen of the wits: a life of Laetitia Pilkington, London: Faber, ISBN 9780571224296. (Internet Archive)
- "Constantia Grierson." Orlando: Women's Writing in the British Isles from the Beginnings to the Present. Accessed 2022-07-24.
- Doody, Margaret Anne. "Swift Among the Women." The Yearbook of English Studies 18 (1998): 68–92.
- "Grierson, Constantia." The Women's Print History Project, 2019, Person ID 175. Accessed 2022-07-24.
- "GRIERSON, Constantia Crawley." Database of Classical Scholars, Rutgers University. Accessed 2022-07-24.
- "Grierson (Crawley), Constantia." Dictionary of Irish Biography. Accessed 2022-07-24.
- Lonsdale, Roger H., ed. (1989), "Constantia Grierson", Eighteenth century women poets: an Oxford anthology, New York: Oxford University Press, pp. 91–93, ISBN 978-0-19-811769-8.
- Pilkington, Laetitia (1997), Elias, Jr, A.C. (ed.), Memoirs of Laetitia Pilkington, Athens, Georgia: University of Georgia Press, OCLC 1150275673. (Internet Archive)
- Rees, D. Ben. (2004), "Grierson, Constantia (1705–1732)", in Matthew, H.C.G.; Harrison, Brian; British Academy (eds.), Oxford Dictionary of National Biography, Oxford: Oxford University Press, ISBN 9780198614111.

== Etexts ==
- P. Virgilii Maronis opera: nunc emendatiora [ed. by C. Grierson]. (Dublin: G. Grierson, 1724). (Google Play)
- Grierson, Constantia (1773), "Poems by Mrs. Constantia Grierson", in Colman, G.; Thornton, B. (eds.), Poems by the most eminent ladies of Great-Britain and Ireland, vol. I (A new ed.), London: printed for T. Becket and Co. and T. Evans, near York building, Strand., p. 240, archived from the original on 25 May 2007.
- Constantia Grierson at the Eighteenth-Century Poetry Archive (ECPA)
