= Elizabeth Pennington =

English poet (1732–1759)

Elizabeth Pennington (1732–1759) was an English poet. Born in Huntingdon, Cambridgeshire, early on she formed an enduring friendship with Martha Ferrar, a fellow poet who became the chief beneficiary of her will. Pennington also maintained friendships with writers Frances Sheridan and Samuel Richardson, and was praised by John Duncombe in his poetic roll call of women writers, The Feminiad (1754). The poems Duncombe was familiar with must have circulated in manuscript. Her three poems that survive were posthumously published: 'Ode to a Thrush', 'Ode to Morning' and 'The Copper Farthing'. All three became anthology pieces, and were published in collections such as Specimens of British Poetesses (1798) and Poems of Eminent Ladies (1780).

Her poetry makes effective use of the burlesque mode, and shows the influence of John Philips's The Splendid Shilling. Her entry in the Oxford Dictionary of National Biography notes that her 'ability to write in a learned and heroic style, despite her limited opportunity for education, is remarkable'.
