= William Oldys =

English antiquarian and bibliographer (1696–1761)

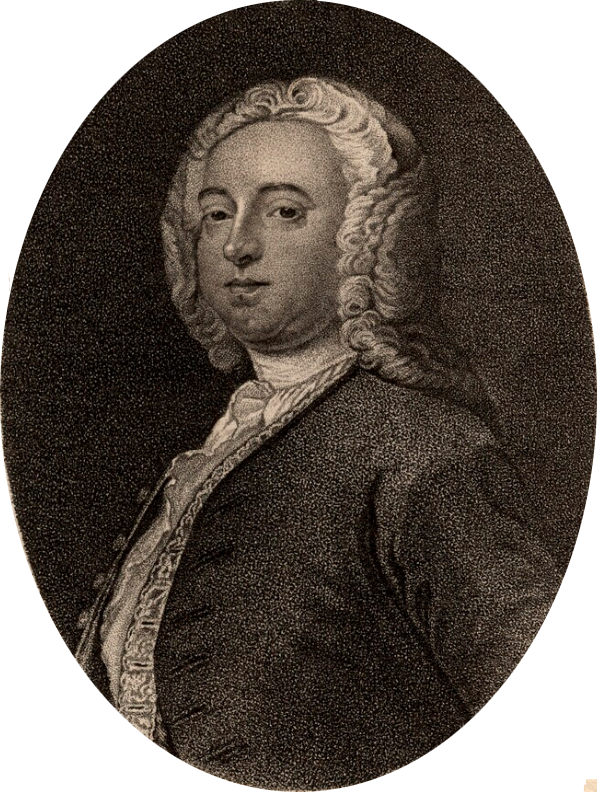
- Portrait of Oldys, published 1795, by John Sewell. Engraved after an unknown original.
- Born: 14 July 1696; London
- Died: 15 April 1761 (aged 64); College of Arms, London

William Oldys (14 July 1696 – 15 April 1761) was an English antiquarian and bibliographer.

== Life ==
He was probably born in London, the illegitimate son of Dr William Oldys (1636–1708), chancellor of Lincoln diocese. His father had held the office of advocate of the admiralty, but lost it in 1693 because he would not prosecute as traitors and pirates the sailors who had served against England under James II.

William Oldys, the younger, lost part of his small patrimony in the South Sea Bubble, and in 1724 went to Yorkshire, spending the greater part of the next six years as the guest of the Earl of Malton. On his return to London he found that his landlord had disposed of the books and papers left in his charge. Among these was an annotated copy of Gerard Langbaine's Dramatick Poets. The book came into the hands of Thomas Coxeter, and subsequently into those of Theophilus Cibber, furnishing the basis of the Lives of the Poets (1753) published with Cibber's name on the title page (though most of it was written by Robert Shiels).

In 1731 Oldys sold his collections to Edward Harley, 2nd Earl of Oxford and Earl Mortimer, who appointed him his literary secretary in 1738. Three years later Harley died, and from that time Oldys worked for the booksellers. His habits were irregular, and in 1751 his debts drove him to the Fleet prison. After two years' imprisonment he was released through the kindness of friends who paid his debts.

In April 1755, he was appointed Norfolk Herald Extraordinary and then Norroy King of Arms by the Duke of Norfolk. According to the current College of Arms, Oldys was, "a noted antiquary and bibliographer but wholly ignorant of heraldry and known for being 'rarely sober in the afternoon, never after supper', and 'much addicted to low company.'"

The British Muse, one of the earliest poetry anthologies to appear in Britain, was published in 1738. From 1747 to 1760, Oldys contributed twenty-two articles to the Biographia Britannica.

== Family ==
Oldys' father, Dr William Oldys (1636–1708), was the son of Rev. William Oldys (1591–1645), who had been murdered in Adderbury, Oxford by Parliamentarian soldiers. The account of his murder tells of how he was hunted all day due to his support of the monarchy and even though he threw down money to distract the closing pack, he was run through with a sword and died. The church bell in Adderbury still bears his name and on the wall of the vestry is a plaque written in Latin describing that dreadful day 15 September 1645. His wife Margaret née Sacheverell died 7 May 1705. She was the daughter of Ambrose Sacheverell, the Reverend at Tadmarton in 1617.

Rev. William Oldys was the son of John Oldys b. 13 July 1563 who was son of John Oldys b.1520 who was son of John Oldys, Bishop of Clonmacnoise, Ireland in 1444 who was son of Richard Oldys b. 1366. The details of this can be found in the British Library Addit 4240. Diary of Birch. MJA
