= Rose Roberts =

English authoress and translator (1730-1788)

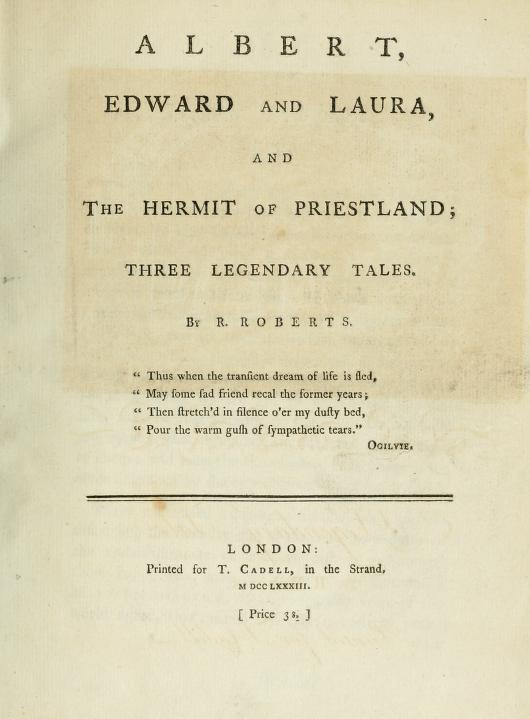
- Title page of Rose Roberts' Albert, Edward and Laura, and The hermit of Priestland; three legendary tales (London: Cadell, 1783)
- Born: 1730
- Died: 1788 (aged 57–58)
- Occupation: writer
- Parent: William Roberts (father)
- Writing career
- Pen name: R. Roberts; a lady
- Language: English
- Years active: 1763–1783

Rose Roberts (1730-1788) was a translator, poet, and writer of sermons.

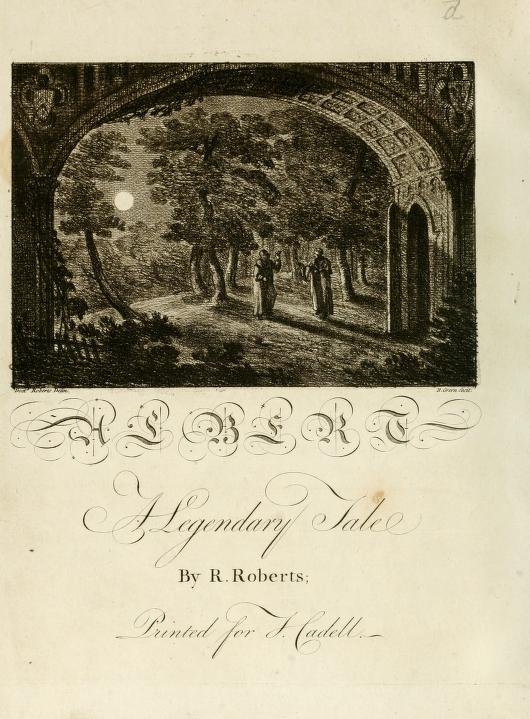
Frontispiece for Rose Roberts' Albert, Edward and Laura, and The hermit of Priestland; three legendary tales (London: Cadell, 1783)

== Life ==
She had at least one sister as well as two brothers: one, Richard, was a headmaster and the other, William, was a poet. Roberts' family had roots in Abergavenny, but she herself seems to have lived in England, in Bristol, Gloucester, then London.

Little is known of her life. She may have known Hannah More as her nieces were her friends.

Her first publication was a translation of Marmontel's Tales. Then she produced a collection of sermons, described as "pithy and conservative", which were popular enough to go into a second, American edition. She wrote at least one drama, though it was not performed She has been credited with "many translated and perhaps original" tales in the Lady's Magazine, 1771–1782.

Her Sermons are singled out by Mary Scott for praise in The Female Advocate (1775), though Scott could not credit Roberts by name since the text was published anonymously:

And Thou, whose pen, congenial to thy breast,
Hath shown us virtue by the Graces drest. (ll. 407–408)

== Works ==
- Translator. Select Moral Tales. Written by Jean François Marmontel. Gloucester, 1763.
- Sermons written by a lady. 1770
- Translator. Elements of the history of France. Written by Abbé Millot. 1771 (abridged translation)
- Translator. The triumph of truth; or, Memoirs of Mr. De La Villette. Translated from the French By R. Roberts. In two volumes. Written by Jeanne-Marie Leprince de Beaumont. London: Thomas Cadell, 1775.
- Translator. The Peruvian Letters, translated from the French with an additional original volume. Written by Françoise de Graffigny. London: Thomas Cadell, 1774.
- Malcolm, 1779 (tragedy, unproduced)
- Albert, Edward and Laura, and the Hermit of Priestland; Three Legendary Tales. London: Cadell, 1783. (Internet Archive)
