= The Feminead =

The Feminead: or, female genius. A poem.
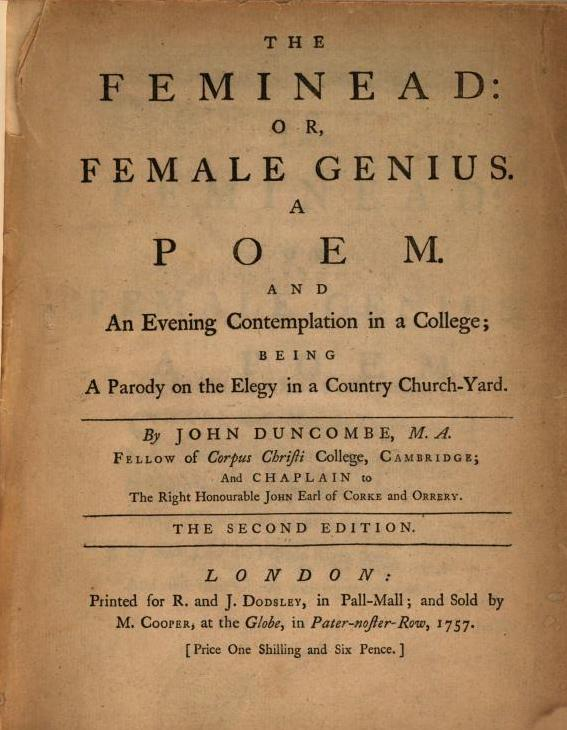
- Title page of John Duncombe's The Feminead (1754), 2nd edition (1757)(Google Books)
- Author: John Duncombe
- Language: English
- Publisher: London: M. Cooper (1st edition); R. & J. Dodsley (2nd edition)
- Publication date: 1754; rpt. 1757
- Publication place: Britain

John Duncombe (1729-1786) published his "canon-forming" celebration of British women writers as The Feminiad in 1754, though the title was revised as The Feminead in the second, 1757 edition.

== The argument ==
The piece is an essay in verse, a form popular in the eighteenth century, consisting of 380 lines of heroic couplets. Duncombe argues that women "shine, / In mind and person equally divine" and urges his readers to resist the "undisputed reign" of "Prejudice" and instead "sing the glories of a sister-choir." He appeals to his readers' sense of nationalism by contrasting "free-born" "British nymphs" to a stereotypical image of women in a "Seraglio," and situates his subjects in a cultural lineage stemming from classical Greece and Rome.

Duncombe takes care to clarify that his support of women artists only extends to those who continue to fulfill their assigned feminine roles and suggests that the pursuit of art and culture might keep women away from more frivolous pursuits:

But lives there one, whose unassuming mind,
Tho' grac'd by nature, and by art refin'd,
Pleas'd with domestic excellence, can spare
Some hours from studious ease to social care,
And with her pen that time alone employs
Which others waste in visits, cards, and noise;
From affectation free, tho' deeply read,
"With wit well natur'd, and with books well bred?"
With such (and such there are) each happy day
Must fly improving, and improv'd away;
Inconstancy might fix and settle there,
And Wisdom's voice approve the chosen fair.

Duncombe makes a selective survey of British women writers. He quickly passes over the racier writers of the previous age such as Behn, Centlivre, and Manley, as well as memoirists Phillips, Pilkington, and Vane— part of "a pattern of contradictory inscription and subordination of women writers that recurs throughout eighteenth-century and Romantic formulations of literary tradition" — to catalogue the moral and artistic virtues of writers still, in most cases, living. Many of the writers mentioned were connected to the Blue Stockings Society, an informal women's social and educational movement in England in the mid-18th century.

Duncombe does not address the subject of writing as a paid profession, but frames it as an avocation. The Feminead ends on a strategic note, with the argument that women who are encouraged to learn and create make better wives and mothers. Such appeals to the presumed self-interests of the reader were not uncommon in early pro-feminist texts.

== Context ==
Duncombe's poem was popular and well-received but not unique; it is one of "multiple attempts to promote and anthologize women writers as important members of the national literary tradition," part of what scholar Moira Ferguson calls an "eruption of female panegyrics," mainly by men, that includes George Ballard's Memoirs of British Ladies (biographies of sixty-five notable women; 1752); Theophilus Cibber's Lives of the Poets (1753); George Colman and Bonnell Thornton's anthology, Poems by Eminent Ladies (1755); Thomas Amory's Memoirs of Several Ladies of Great Britain (1755); and Biographium faemineum: the female worthies, or, Memoirs of the most illustrious ladies, of all ages and nations, who have been eminently distinguished for their magnanimity, learning, genius, virtue, piety, and other excellent endowments. London: Printed for S. Crowder, 1766. 2 vols. (Anon; 1766). In 1774, Mary Scott published The Female Advocate; a poem. Occasioned upon reading Mr. Duncombe's Feminead (London: Joseph Johnson) in which she expresses her "grateful pleasure" to Duncombe, as well as her desire to recognize a further group of writers: she includes above fifty, three of whom Duncombe had recognized: Chapone, Philips, and Pilkington. All these texts taken together, according to Betty Schellenberg, indicate the broad cultural significance of women's authorship by the mid-eighteenth century.

== Writers named in The Feminead ==
- Aphra Behn (1640–1689)
- Frances Brooke (1724–1789)
- Elizabeth Carter (1717–1806)
- Susannah Centlivre (1669–1723)
- Hester Chapone (1727–1801)
- Catharine Trotter Cockburn (1679–1749)
- Susanna Duncombe (1725–1812)
- Anne Kingsmill Finch (1661–1720)
- Anne Ingram (c. 1696 – 1764)
- Mary Leapor (1722–1746)
- Judith Madan (1702–1781)
- Delarivier Manley (1663 or c. 1670 – 1724)
- Martha Peckard (1729–1805)
- Elizabeth Pennington (1732–1759)
- Katherine Philips (1632–1664)
- Teresia Constantia Phillips (1709–1765)
- Laetitia Pilkington (c. 1709 – 1750)
- Elizabeth Singer Rowe (1674–1737)
- Frances Seymour, Duchess of Somerset (born 1699)
- Frances Anne Vane (c. 1715 – 1788)
- Mehetabel Wesley Wright (1697–1750)

== See also ==
- The Female Advocate
- The Feminiad: A Poem (Wikisource)
- Mary Scott
- Women's writing (literary category)

== Etexts ==
- Digitized version of Augustan Reprint Society edition (1981) available at the Internet Archive
- Digitized version of 2nd edition available at Google Books
