= Eliza Roberts =

Eliza Roberts may refer to:

- Eliza Roberts (nurse), English nurse among the first to accompany Florence Nightingale
- Eliza Roberts (poet), British Romantic-era poet and translator of Rousseau
- Eliza Roberts (actress), American actress, film producer and casting director

== See also ==
- Elisa Roberts, Australian politician
