= Sican =

Sican may refer to:

- The Sican culture in what is now Peru
- Sican language
- The Sicani, a people of ancient Sicily
- A person with the surname Sican:
  - Elizabeth Sican, 18th-century Irish literary critic
