= Martha Peckard =

British poet (1729–1805)

Martha Peckard (née Ferrar; 1729 – 14 January 1805) was a British poet. She is best known for her works "Ode to Spring" (1758) and "Ode to Cynthia" (1758).

== Life ==
Martha Ferrar was born in 1729. She was the eldest daughter of Huntingdon attorney Edward Ferrar, a descendant of the Ferrar family of Little Gidding. On 13 June 1755 she married the Reverend Peter Peckard. In 1760, her husband was appointed rector of Fletton, Huntingdonshire and she lived in the rectory there until her death.

Martha Peckard is best known for her works "Ode to Spring" and "Ode to Cynthia", both written in 1758. “Ode to Cynthia” appears in Dodsley’s collection, Richardson’s Correspondence, and Egerton Brydges's Censura Literaria. “Ode to Spring”, also in Dodsley, was called by Thomas Edwards “a charming piece” which must do her honour with all judges. John Duncombe terms her odes “elegant” in The Feminead. With her husband, she also composed an elegy for a tombstone in Fletton churchyard; the epitaph for the parish clerk appears in The Gentleman's Magazine (2, 1789). It has been suggested that she composed the inscription of a memorial to Anna Maria Vassa (died 1797), eldest daughter of the former slave and anti-slavery campaigner Olaudah Equiano, at St Andrew's Church, Chesterton.

Martha Peckard died on 14 January 1805.

== Works ==
- "Ode to Spring" (1758)
- "Ode to Cynthia" (1758)
