= Francis Wythens =

British judge and politician

Sir Francis Wythens SL KC (c. 1635 – 9 May 1704) of Eltham, Kent was an English judge and politician.

== Life ==
Born to William Wythens and his wife Frances King, Wythens matriculated at St John's College, Oxford on 13 November 1650 before joining the Middle Temple on 27 November 1654. He was called to the Bar there on 9 February 1660, later becoming a Bencher.

In 1677 he became Deputy Steward of Westminster; this started his interest in politics, and in September 1679 he was returned as a Member of Parliament for Westminster. This was done illegally; supporters of the King were brought in to boost Wythens's votes, and a book containing 700 votes for the other candidate "was artificially mislaid and lost by the officers trusted". On 25 November 1679 he defended Thomas Knox, accused of libel against Titus Oates, and on 2 July 1680 prosecuted Henry Care for publishing Roman Catholic works. These marked him as a member of the Tory political faction, which was in power at the time; he was rewarded with a knighthood in 1680 and promotion to King's Counsel. As a result of his corrupt election, when Parliament eventually met in October 1680 he was expelled from the House of Commons.

Despite this setback his work at the bar continued to increase; he prosecuted Edward Fitzharris and took part in other high-profile trials, and when the Tory domination of British politics increased, was made a Serjeant-at-Law in April 1683. On 25 April he became a Justice of the King's Bench, apparently because he could be trusted to implement royal policy. Wythens oversaw the prosecution of the Rye House Plotters and the conviction of Titus Oates for perjury before travelling to the West Counties following the Monmouth Rebellion. John Evelyn in 1683 recorded his shock at Wythens' drunken and riotous behaviour just days after he sat on the court which condemned Algernon Sidney to death for treason. He was dismissed as a Justice on 21 April 1687, apparently for refusing to institute martial law in peacetime; he was replaced by Richard Allibond. Wythens's removal has been called "one of the most serious charges against James II". After a return to practise as a barrister, Wythens died on 9 May 1704.

He died in 1704. He had married in 1685, Elizabeth, the daughter of Sir Thomas Taylor, 1st Bt., of Park House, Maidstone, Kent and had one daughter.

== Bibliography ==
- Sainty, John (1993). The Judges of England 1272 -1990: a list of judges of the superior courts. Oxford: Selden Society. OCLC 29670782.
