= Mary Leapor =

English poet (1722–1746)

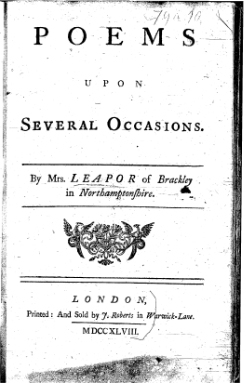
- Title page, Poems Upon Several Occasions (1748) by Mary Leapor
- Born: 26 February 1722; Marston St Lawrence, Northamptonshire, England
- Died: 12 November 1746 (aged 24); Brackley, Northamptonshire, England
- Occupation: Poet

Mary Leapor (1722–1746) was an English poet, born in Marston St. Lawrence, Northamptonshire, the only child of Anne Sharman (died 1741) and Philip Leapor (1693–1771), a gardener. She, out of the many labouring-class writers of the period, was noticeably well received.

== Biography ==
Partly self-educated, she probably received a rudimentary education at either a local dame school, or at the local free school in Brackley on the south side of the Chapel. According to her father she began writing "tolerably" at the age of 10. Her father recollected, "She would often be scribbling, and sometimes in Rhyme," but that her mother ended up discouraging the writing, requesting she find some "more profitable employment". She was fortunate enough to attain a position as kitchen maid with Susanna Jennens ("Parthenissa" in Leapor's poetry), who apparently encouraged her writing and allowed her the use of her library. Jennens wrote poetry herself and had connections to both Mary Astell and Mary Wortley Montagu. Not all employers were so accommodating and Leapor's devotion to writing led to her dismissal from a subsequent position with Sir Richard Chauncy's family, as she apparently would not stop writing even in the kitchen.

In 1784 an account was published in The Gentleman's Magazine, possibly by Chauncy's son, allegedly describing Chauncy's remembrances of the poet. According to this piece, Leapor's "fondness for writing verses there displayed itself by her sometimes taking up her pen while the jack was standing still, and the meat scorching … He represented her as having been extremely swarthy, and quite emaciated, with a long crane-neck, and a short body, much resembling, in shape, a bass-viol."

She returned home to Brackley to care for her widowed father in 1744 or 1745, and despite many responsibilities and not being in the best of health herself, she continued to write, so that her work circulated in the town. As a consequence she met Bridget Freemantle (1698–1779), the daughter of a former rector, who became both her friend and mentor. This relationship seems to have marked a turning point for Leapor and she wrote the bulk of her work in a very short period. It was Freemantle who suggested that Leapor publish a volume of poetry by subscription. She also attempted to have a play of hers, a blank-verse tragedy called The Unhappy Father, staged in London at the Covent Garden Theatre. (A second play remained unfinished.) Neither venture was immediately successful. Leapor died of measles at Brackley on 12 November 1746 at the age of 24.

The Bishop's Transcripts of the Parish Records record that she was buried "in woollen" two days later in Brackley. Although Mary is thought to have lived in the south Brackley area known as Goose Green, which had its own church of St James (now demolished), George Baker in a description of the parish church of St Peter with St James in volume 1 of his History and Antiquities of the County of Northampton (published 1822–1830) suggests that Mary is buried in St Peter's churchyard. Some proceeds from the publication of Volume One of her Poems Upon Several Occasions were used to pay for a headstone, but this has been lost. According to Mary's contemporary, Henry Purefoy and George Baker, the headstone read, "In Memory of Mary Leapor daughter of Phillip and Ann Leapor: who departed this life Nov. ye 26. 1746 Aged 24". The date of death on the headstone is believed to be incorrect; the Bishop's Transcript has the definitive record of the date.

Bridget Freemantle continued her quest to publish Leapor's work. In 1748 she arranged for the posthumous publication of Poems upon Several Occasions with some 600 subscribers, for the benefit of Philip Leapor. A second volume of poetry and drama was published three years later by Samuel Richardson and edited by Isaac Hawkins Browne. Mary Delany, Stephen Duck, Elizabeth Montagu, and Sarah Scott were among the subscribers. These volumes secured Leapor's reputation as "one of the most interesting of the natural poets." John Duncombe praised her in The Feminead (1754), and Bonnell Thornton and George Colman included her in their Poems by Eminent Ladies (1755). Leapor herself seems not to have welcomed her status as a "natural" poet "untainted" by artifice. She worked hard to acquire a literary education as best she could and embraced the neoclassical ideals of her period. At the time of her death she had accumulated 17 volumes and several volumes of plays: a considerable library for someone with a limited income. There are many grammatical errors in Leapor's work, for which Freemantle apologises in the Preface to the "Poems Upon Several Occasions", assuring readers that had Leapor lived to edit them, the poems would have been flawless. She adds that they are, nevertheless, entertaining.

== Commemorations ==
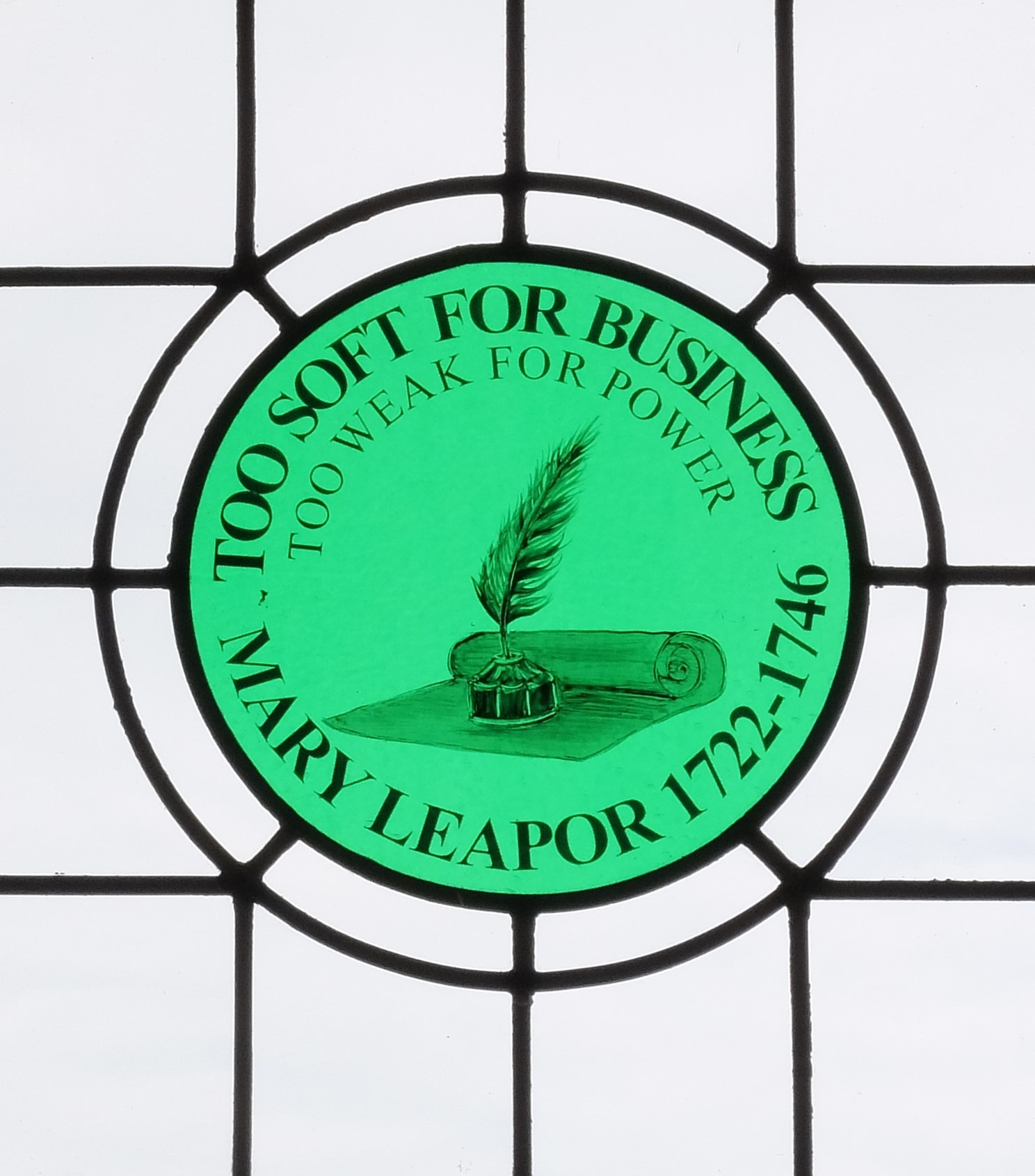
The Mary Leapor window in Brackley Town Hall

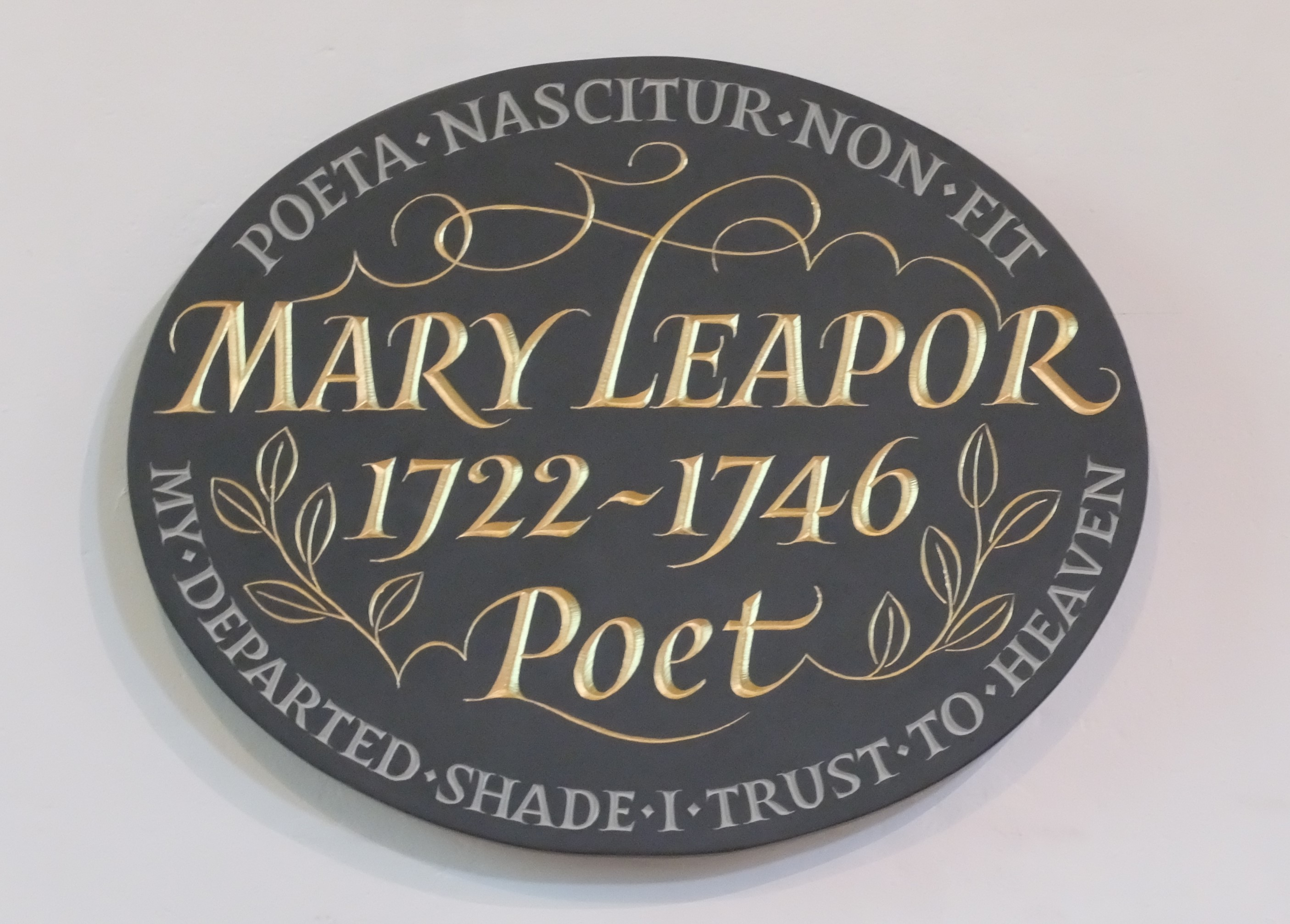
The Mary Leapor Memorial in the Lady Chapel of St Peter's Church Brackley

After the "centuries of neglect" recognised by Prof. John Clarke ("Yesterday's Brackley", Barracuda Books, 1990) in a chapter about Mary, a window, inspired by her work and based on a design by a local resident Carolyn Hunter, was created by stained-glass artist Rachael Aldridge and installed on the first floor of the newly refurbished Brackley Town Hall in 2018.

In 2019 Carolyn commissioned the stone carver, Bernard Johnson ( http://www.bernardjohnson.co.uk ), to create a permanent memorial to Mary in Welsh (Aberllefenni) slate, which is now placed in the Lady Chapel of St Peter's Church. The text of the memorial includes a Latin aphorism ‘(Poeta Nascitur Non Fit, i. e. "A Poet is born not made") and a quotation from Mary's poem, "Mira's Will" , in which she foresaw her early death ("My departed Shade I trust to Heaven"). The stylised leaves represent laurel, which in the same poem Mary called "the true emblem of my rhyme".

== Work ==
Like many writers of the period, Leapor used a pastoral-sounding pen name, "Mira". Much of her work is modelled on that of Alexander Pope, whose work she admired. Also a model was Jonathan Swift, particularly his anti-blason poetry (the de-emphasis on the female physical body in relation to nature). At times Leapor's writing reflects her own pessimistic views on life as a woman who was described as being witty, poor, infirm and unattractive. She writes "much of and to women, of the discrepancy of her sex and class with her poetic urge." Her work focuses on debunking romantic myths and reiterating the importance of education for women, which she understood all too well.

From Leapor's "strongly feminist" "An Essay on Woman,":

WOMAN – a pleasing but a short-lived flower,
Too soft for business and too weak for power:
A wife in bondage, or neglected maid;
Despised if ugly; if she's fair – betrayed.

In "An Essay on Woman," Leapor describes the certain downfall women face when they get old. She is highly critical of women being judged solely on their appearance, and deplores the limited choices open to them. Like Alexander Pope, Leapor saw "the general condition of women as a series of contradictions"; though unlike Pope or Jonathan Swift, they weren't "follies to be satirized", but rather "injustices to be protested against". Both poets deeply influenced Leapor's work, although she counters their interpretations and understanding of women's general unhappiness. Drawing from her personal experience as a woman, she saw injustice in the social order rather than in women themselves. This is reflected in the representation of her views on beauty, the female body, marriage, family and female friendship in her work.

Leapor lived in a culture where women were expected to value themselves by their beauty. A great deal of money would have been needed to achieve perfection in beauty, which required creating an artificial appearance: "hardware" was fastened about the bodies of women to straighten posture, stays squeezed their waists, and faces were "caked and heavily coloured" with cosmetics. Leapor "attempts to see beyond artificial appearance to what she believes is more authentic femininity". Her poem "Dorinda at her Glass" exemplifies this as she describes a woman who has valued herself by the image she sees in the mirror, only to be devastated when she loses her youthful beauty with age:

To her lov'd Glass repair'd the weeping Maid,

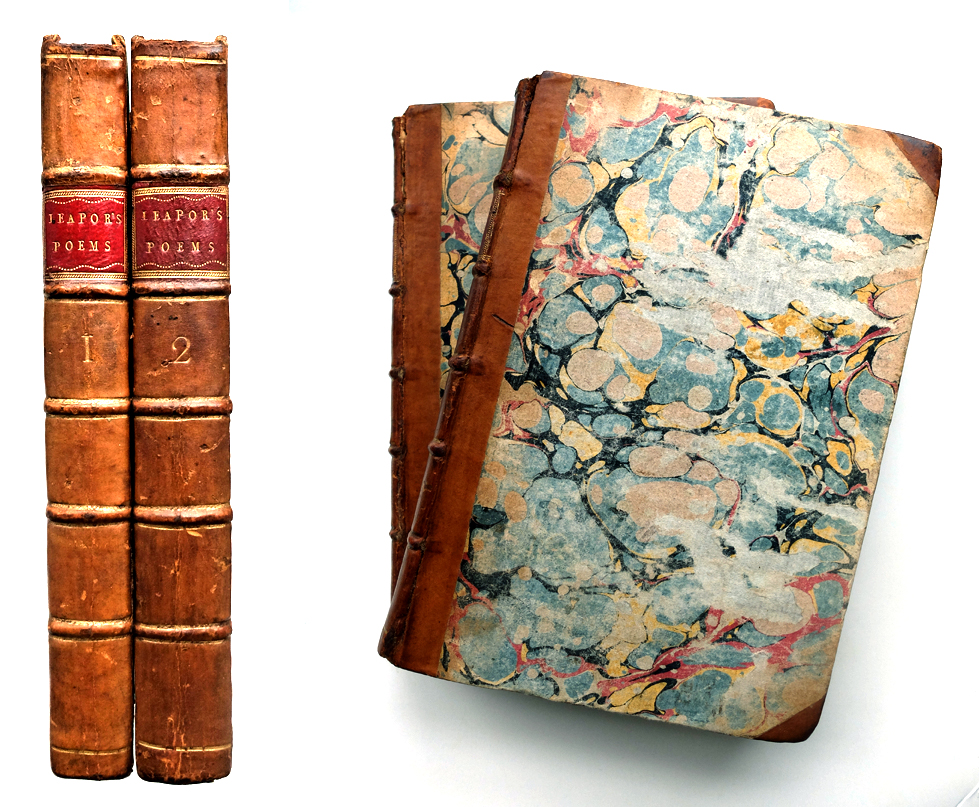
Mary Leapor, Poems Upon Several Occasions, Vols 1 & 2, first editions, conserved by Christopher Shaw

And with a Sigh address'd the alter'd Shade.

Say, what art thou, that wear'st a gloomy Form,
With low'ring Forehead, like a norther Storm;
Cheeks pale and hollow, as the Face of Woe,

And Lips that with no gay Vermilion glow?

Through the poem Leapor advises and warns women that beauty does not last and to improve themselves intrinsically.

"In 'Dorinda at her Glass', 'Advice to Sophronia', and other poems, Leapor asserts that women should preserve their dignity by accepting the loss of beauty". Leapor herself is affected by standards of beauty, and wishes to escape her "plainness" and the vulgar comments on her appearance, and dreams of being beautiful. This wistfulness for mainstream acceptance and admiration is illustrated in her poems "The Visit" and "The Disappointment."

Leapor's most extensive examination of standards of beauty in parts of fashionable society is "Corydon. Phillario. Or, Mira's Picture". This "self-portrait" attempts to break in some contemporary standards of beauty, by picking apart her bodily flaws openly, posing a challenge to a sub-culture which expected women to tuck away their defects:

Corydon.

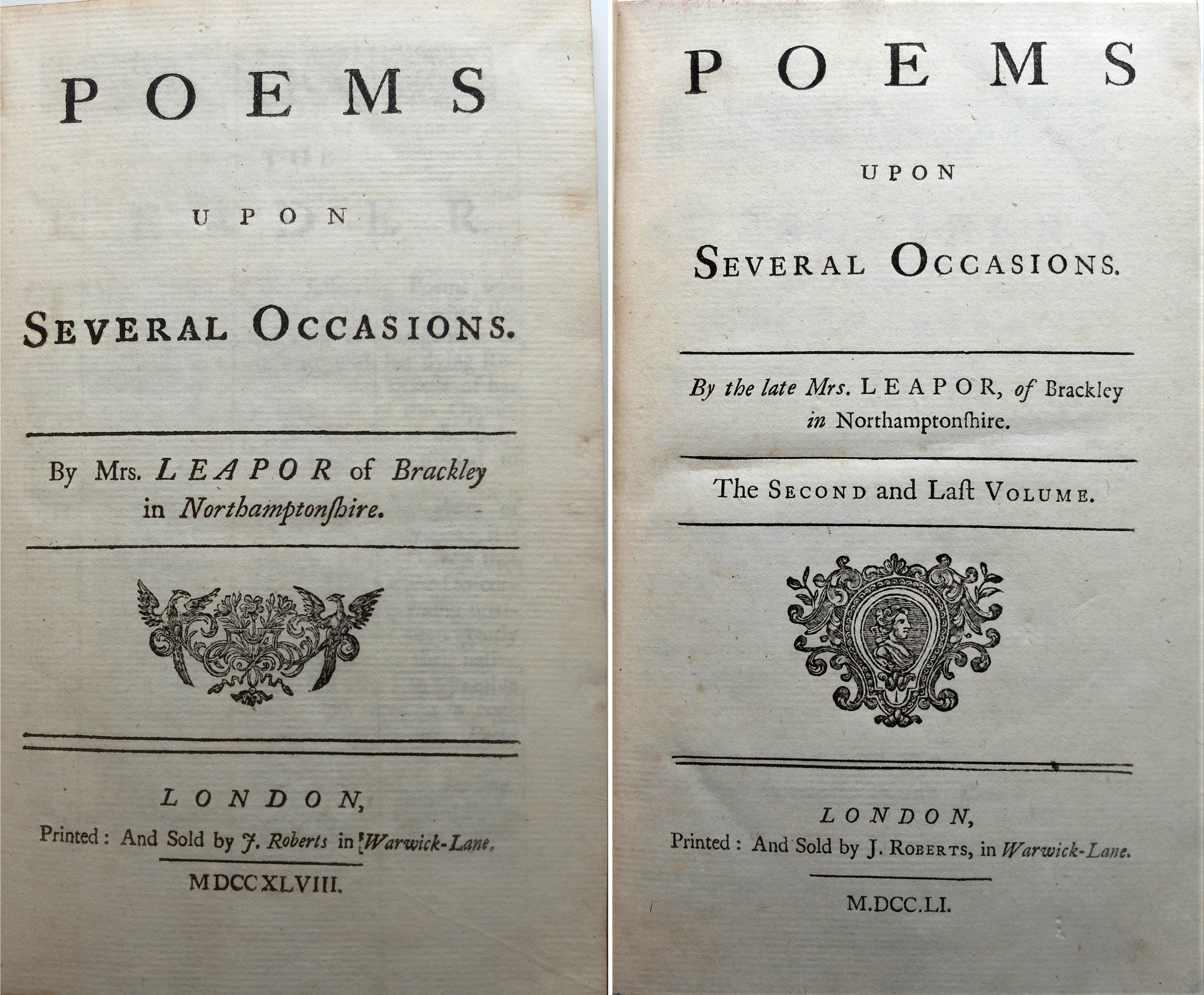
Mary Leapor Poems Upon Several Occasions, Title Pages to Vols 1 & 2, first editions

But she has teeth --

Phillario.
--Consid'ring how they grow,
'Tis no great matter if she has or no:
They look decay'd with Posset, and with Plumbs,

And seem prepar'd to quit her swelling Gums.

Leapor also turned her attention to the marriage market:

(From Strephon to Celia) Now, madam, as the chat goes round,
I hear you have ten thousand pound:
But that as I a trifle hold,
Give me your person, dem your gold;
Yet for your own sake 'tis secured,
I hope – your houses too insured

Celia has admitted her love and admiration for Strephon and this is his businesslike reply. He goes on almost to count all Celia's assets on his fingers. He assures her of his admiration, briefly and in highly conventional terms, then returns to the subject that really interests him: her fortune. Leapor ironically exposes the reality of the marriage market and how women are reduced to their financial worth, despite the veneer of sentiment.

Today Leapor's work is celebrated for its sharp observations about life as a woman in the 18th century. She remains one of the few female labouring-class writers of the period, along with Ann Yearsley and Elizabeth Bentley.

== Bibliography ==
- Poems Upon Several Occasions. Vol. I. London: J. Roberts, 1748 (Scanned at Internet Archive) (Transcribed at Eighteenth-Century Poetry Archive)
- Poems Upon Several Occasions. Vol. II. London: J. Roberts, 1751 (Scanned at Internet Archive)

== See also ==
- List of 18th-century British working-class writers

== Sources ==
- Blain, Virginia, et al., eds. "Leapor, Mary." The Feminist Companion to Literature in English. New Haven and London: Yale UP, 1990. p. 640
- Gillespie, Stuart. "Leapor, Mary (1722–1746)". Oxford Dictionary of National Biography (online ed.). Oxford University Press. doi:10.1093/ref:odnb/16246. (Subscription, Wikipedia Library access or UK public library membership required.)
- Greene, Richard. Mary Leapor: A Study in Eighteenth-Century Women's Poetry. Oxford: Clarendon Press; New York: Oxford UP, 1993
- Griffin, Dustin. "Mary Leapor and Charlotte Lennox." Literary Patronage in England, 1650–1800. Cambridge UP, 1996. ISBN 978-0-521-56085-6; ISBN 0-521-56085-3
- Todd, Janet, ed. "Leapor, Mary (Molly)." British Women Writers: a critical reference guide. London: Routledge, 1989. pp. 401–403
- Van-Hagen, Stephen. Mary Leapor. The Literary Encyclopedia. 3 March 2007. Retrieved 20 November 2018
