= Peter Peckard =

Church of England minister and abolitionist (1797)

Peter Peckard (c. 1718 – 8 December 1797) was an English Whig, Vice-Chancellor of Cambridge University, Church of England minister and abolitionist. From 1781 he was Master of Magdalene College, Cambridge. He was incorporated at Cambridge in 1782, appointed vice-chancellor in 1784, and created Doctor of Divinity (DD) per literas regias in 1785. In April 1792 he became Dean of Peterborough.

== Life ==
The son of the Rev. John Peckard of Welbourn, Lincolnshire, he matriculated at Corpus Christi College, Oxford on 20 July 1734, then aged 16, and was admitted on 9 October. He graduated B.A. 1738, M.A. March 1741–2, and became scholaris, or probationary fellow, in 1744. He was ordained as a priest of the Church of England in 1746. He seems to have become a chaplain in the army and to have settled for a time at Huntingdon. On 13 June 1755 he married Martha Ferrar (1729–1805), eldest daughter of Edward Ferrar, attorney at Huntingdon. He was vicar of St Martin's Church, Lincoln (1747 - 1750) and rector of Skelton (1748 - 1760).

He was appointed in 1760 to the rectory of Fletton and the vicarage of Yaxley, both near Peterborough. A dispensation for the holding of these two livings at the same time was needed, and it was obtained with difficulty from Thomas Secker, the Archbishop of Canterbury. Peckard was considered heterodox upon the question concerning an intermediate or separate state of conscious existence between death and the resurrection, and his examination was several times adjourned. He obtained his dispensation at last, but only after he had signed four articles to some extent modifying his views, and it was given at a date when the second benefice was within a day or two of lapsing. Edward Law commented that "Peter Peckard has escaped out of Lollard's tower with the loss of his tail."

In 1766 Peckard became chaplain to the first troop of Grenadier Guards, and served with it in Germany. The rectory of Fletton was held by him until his death, but he vacated the vicarage of Yaxley in 1777. He was prebendary of Clifton in Lincoln Cathedral from 9 May 1774, and of Rampton in Southwell Minster from 23 October 1777 to his death. He was also appointed in 1777, under dispensation, to the rectory of Tansor in Northamptonshire, and from 1793 to 1797 he retained the rectory of Abbot's Ripton, near Huntingdon.

In 1781 he was appointed to the mastership of Magdalene College, Cambridge, by the Visitor of the College, John Griffin, afterwards Lord Howard de Walden, who had the right of presentation as owner of the estate of Audley End. He was incorporated at Cambridge in 1782, appointed vice-chancellor in 1784, and created Doctor of Divinity (DD) per literas regias in 1785. In April 1792 he was advanced by the crown to the deanery of Peterborough. He built a new parsonage-house at Fletton, and was permitted by the patron, John Proby, 2nd Earl of Carysfort, to nominate his successor to the benefice. Peckard died on 8 December 1797, and was buried in Peterborough Cathedral. Peckard left property to Magdalene College, and also founded two scholarships.

== Works ==
The Zong massacre of 1781 prompted Peckard to speak strongly against slave trade in his sermons, some of which were published as tracts and pamphlets.

On becoming vice-chancellor at Cambridge he set the Latin essay competition question, "Anne Liceat Invitos in Servitutem Dare?" ("Is it lawful to enslave the unconsenting?") The first prize went to Thomas Clarkson, later the leading activist in the cause of abolition.

Peckard published sermons of a liberal tendency, and those of later life drew attention to the evils of slavery. The views which Archbishop Secker deemed heterodox were set out in:

- Observations on the Doctrine of an Intermediate State, 1756.
- Further Observations on the Doctrine of an Intermediate State, 1757. This was in reply to the queries of Thomas Morton, rector of Bassingham.

Peckard's opinions were also criticised by Caleb Fleming, in his Survey of the Search of the Souls, 1759, and defended by him in Observations on Mr. Fleming's Survey, 1759, which provoked from Fleming A Defence of the Conscious Scheme against that of the Mortalist.

Among Peckard's other sermons and tracts were:

- The popular Clamour against the Jews indefensible, 1753.
- A Dissertation on Revelation, chap. xi. ver. 13, 1756. This was written to prove that the passage was prophetical, and fulfilled by the Lisbon earthquake. It was criticised at some length in The Gentleman's Magazine, 1756 (pp. 138–139), and defended by the author in the same periodical (pp. 213–14).
- The proper Stile of Christian Oratory, 1770 (against theatrical declamation).
- National Crimes the Cause of National Punishments, 1795. It passed through three editions, and referred mainly to the slave trade, on which subject Peckard often preached.

He published anonymously in 1776 a treatise on Subscription with Historical Extracts, and in 1778 a pamphlet Am I not a Man and a Brother?

Peckard's father-in-law, Edward Ferrar, left him by will many books and papers, including a Life by John Ferrar of Nicholas Ferrar of the Little Gidding community. It was published by him in 1790 as Memoirs of the Life of Mr. Nicholas Ferrar, but with some heavy edits. It was reprinted, with a few omissions, in Christopher Wordsworth's Ecclesiastical Biography (v. 69–266), and published separately in an abridged form in 1852. Some of Peckard's manuscripts, which were helpful to students of the genealogy of the early New England settlers, are referred to in John Wingate Thornton's First Records of Anglo-American Colonisation, Boston, 1859.

A poetical essay on Peckard is in The Gentleman's Magazine, 1799 (pt. i. p. 325), and one epitaph by him and his wife Martha Ferrar Peckard, are in that periodical for 1789 (pt. ii. p. 748).

== Memorial ==
Magdalene College, Cambridge has a Peter Peckard Memorial Prize in his honour.

== Notes ==
Attribution

This article incorporates text from a publication now in the public domain: "Peckard, Peter". Dictionary of National Biography. London: Smith, Elder & Co. 1885–1900.
