= Susanna Duncombe =

English poet and artist (1725–1812)

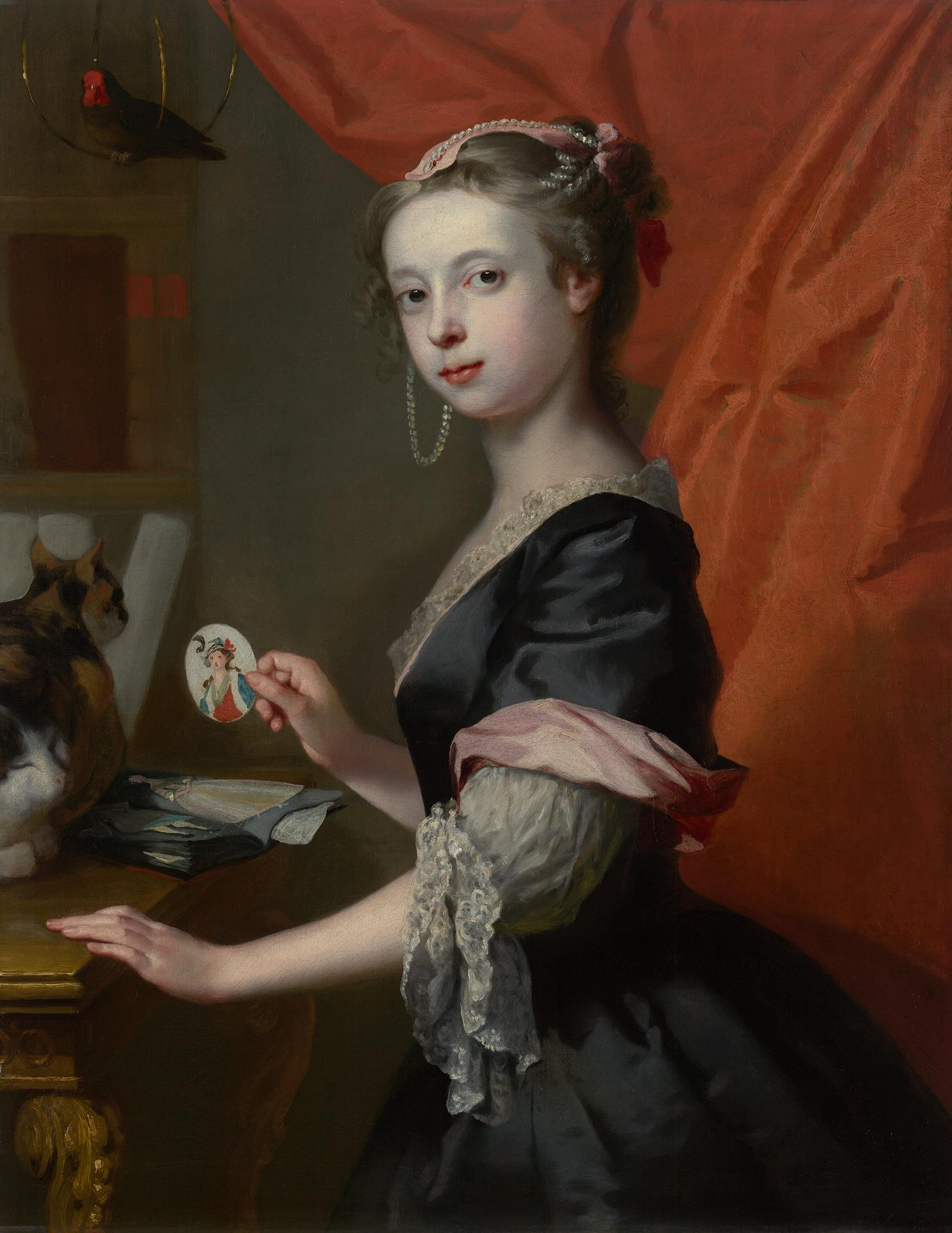
- Susanna Highmore, painting by Joseph Highmore, c. 1740-1745
- Born: 5 December 1725; London, England
- Died: 27 October 1812 (aged 86); Canterbury, England

Susanna Duncombe (née Highmore; 5 December 1725 – 28 October 1812) was an English poet and artist.

== Life ==
She was the only daughter of Joseph Highmore, the painter who illustrated Samuel Richardson's Pamela, or Virtue Rewarded, was born in 1725, probably in London, either in the city or Lincoln's Inn Fields. Her mother, Susanna Highmore, was also a poet.

Much care went into the daughter's education and she came to be proficient in Latin, Spanish, French and Italian. She was one of a party to whom Richardson read his Sir Charles Grandison; and she made a sketch of the scene, which forms the frontispiece to volume ii of Mrs Barbauld's Correspondence of Samuel Richardson. She contributed the story of Fidelio and Honoria to The Adventurer; was eulogised by John Duncombe as Eugenia in his Feminead, 1754; and, after a protracted courtship, they were married on 20 April 1763, and went to his living in Kent, taking her father with them. Later resident in Green Court on the close of Canterbury Cathedral, she was a friend of Eliza Berkeley, and kept cats.

In 1773, Duncombe furnished a frontispiece to volume i of her husband's Letters by John Hughes. She also wrote a few poems in the Poetical Calendar, and in 1782 some of her poems appeared in Nichols's Select Collection.

In January 1786, she was left a widow, with one child, a daughter, and took up her residence in the Precincts, Canterbury. In 1808, her portrait of Mrs. Chapone was transferred from her "Grandison" frontispiece to the second edition of Mrs. Chapone's Posthumous Works. She died on 28 October 1812 and was buried with her husband at St Mary Bredman, Canterbury.
