= George Grierson (printer) =

- Born: September 1679; Scotland
- Died: October 1753 (aged 74); Drumcondra, Dublin
- Resting place: St. John's Parish Church, Drumcondra, Dublin, Ireland
- Known for: Printer, publisher
- Spouse: Constantia Grierson

George Grierson (c. 1679 – 1753) was a Scottish-born printer and publisher in Dublin, Ireland, whose descendants continued in the book trade in Dublin for several generations. He was married to the editor and poet Constantia Grierson.

== Life ==
Grierson arrived in Dublin about 1703 and shortly afterwards set up a printing establishment, "The Sign of the Two Bibles" in Essex Street. He set about printing large impressions of Bibles and Books of Common Prayer of different sorts and sizes. In addition to Bibles and Prayer Books, he produced the volumes known as Grierson's Classics, works of classical writers of antiquity. Among his productions were the first edition published in Ireland, in 1724, of Paradise Lost; Sir William Petty's Maps of Ireland; and other valuable works. He also spent over £700 on printing equipment.

In 1709, he was admitted a Freeman of the City of Dublin by Special Grace. In 1720 he was one of the churchwardens of the Church of St. John, Drumcondra, in the Registers of which the baptisms and burials of his children are entered.

After he became acquainted with Constantia Crawley she started editing many works Grierson was publishing. They married around 1727, shortly after the death of his first wife. By 1727 she had carefully edited titles in the pocket "Classics" edition, including Terence's Comediae, to which she prefixed a Greek epigram from her own pen, inscribing it to Robert, son of Lord Carteret; in 1730 she edited the work of Tacitus, inscribing it to Lord Carteret himself. Jonathan Swift was so impressed with her editing that he wrote to Alexander Pope on 6 February 1730: 'She is a very good Latin and Greek scholar, and hath lately published a fine edition of Tacitus, and she writes carmina Anglicana non contemnenda.'

Constantia played an important role in her husband's business and household, which included apprentices and journeymen as well as domestic servants. Her husband emphasized her contributions in his successful petition to the Irish House of Commons in 1729 to be granted the patent for King's Printer: "the Editions corrected by her have been approved of, not only in this Kingdom, but in Great Britain, Holland and elsewhere, and the Art of Printing, through her care and assistance, has been brought to greater perfection than has been hitherto in this Kingdom."

After Constantia's death in 1732 Grierson married Jane Blow, daughter of James Blow, a Belfast printer.

One of his grandchildren was the linguist George Abraham Grierson (1851–1941).

== Sources ==
- Grierson, Constantia (1773), "Poems by Mrs. Constantia Grierson", in Colman, G.; Thornton, B. (eds.), Poems by the most eminent ladies of Great-Britain and Ireland, vol. I (A new ed.), London: printed for T. Becket and Co. and T. Evans, near York building, Strand., p. 240, archived from the original on 25 May 2007.
- Bryan, Coleborne (2004), "Barber, Mary (c.1685–1755)", in Matthew, H.C.G.; Harrison, Brian; British Academy (eds.), Oxford Dictionary of National Biography, Oxford: Oxford University Press, ISBN 9780198614111.
