= Taylor baronets of Park House (1665) =

Escutcheon of the Taylor baronets of Park House

The Taylor baronetcy, of Park House in the County of Kent, was created in the Baronetage of England on 18 January 1665 for Thomas Taylor, who died that year. The History of Parliament comments that he "was probably of royalist sympathies". The 2nd Baronet sat as Member of Parliament for Maidstone. The title became extinct on the death of the 3rd Baronet in 1720.

== Taylor baronets, of Park House (1665) ==
- Sir Thomas Taylor, 1st Baronet (1630–1665)
- Sir Thomas Taylor, 2nd Baronet (1657–1696)
- Sir Thomas Taylor, 3rd Baronet (1693–1720)
