= Robert Shiels =

English writer

Robert Shiels (also Shiells or Shields) (died 1753) was an English literary compiler.

== Life ==
He was born in Roxburghshire around the end of the seventeenth century, and came to London as a journeyman printer. Samuel Johnson approved of him as a Jacobite, and gave him a place on the team of six helpers he used on his Dictionary.

Shiels died of consumption in May's Buildings, London, on 27 December 1753.

== Works ==
Shiels was recommended to Ralph Griffiths and employed on the Lives of the Poets of Great Britain and Ireland to the time of Dean Swift (London, 5 vols. 1753), to which the name of Theophilus Cibber was attached. The compilation was mainly based on work of Gerard Langbaine and Giles Jacob, with the help of Thomas Coxeter's. Any fresh research used was due to Shiels, with Cibber's role being revision. The later volumes are ascribed on the title-page to Cibber ‘and other hands.’

Apart from his compilations, Shiels wrote a didactic poem on ‘Marriage’ in blank verse (London, ‘at the Dunciad in Ludgate Street,’ 1748), and another piece in praise of Johnson's ‘Irene,’ called ‘The Power of Beauty’ (printed in George Pearch's ‘Collection,’ i. 186). Shiels venerated his countryman James Thomson, on whose death he published an elegy, ‘Musidorus’ (London, 1748).
