= Eliza Roberts (poet) =

British poet and translator

- Occupations: poet; translator
- Writing career
- Language: English
- Years active: 1780-1788
- Period: Romantic era
- Notable work: Translator of Rousseau

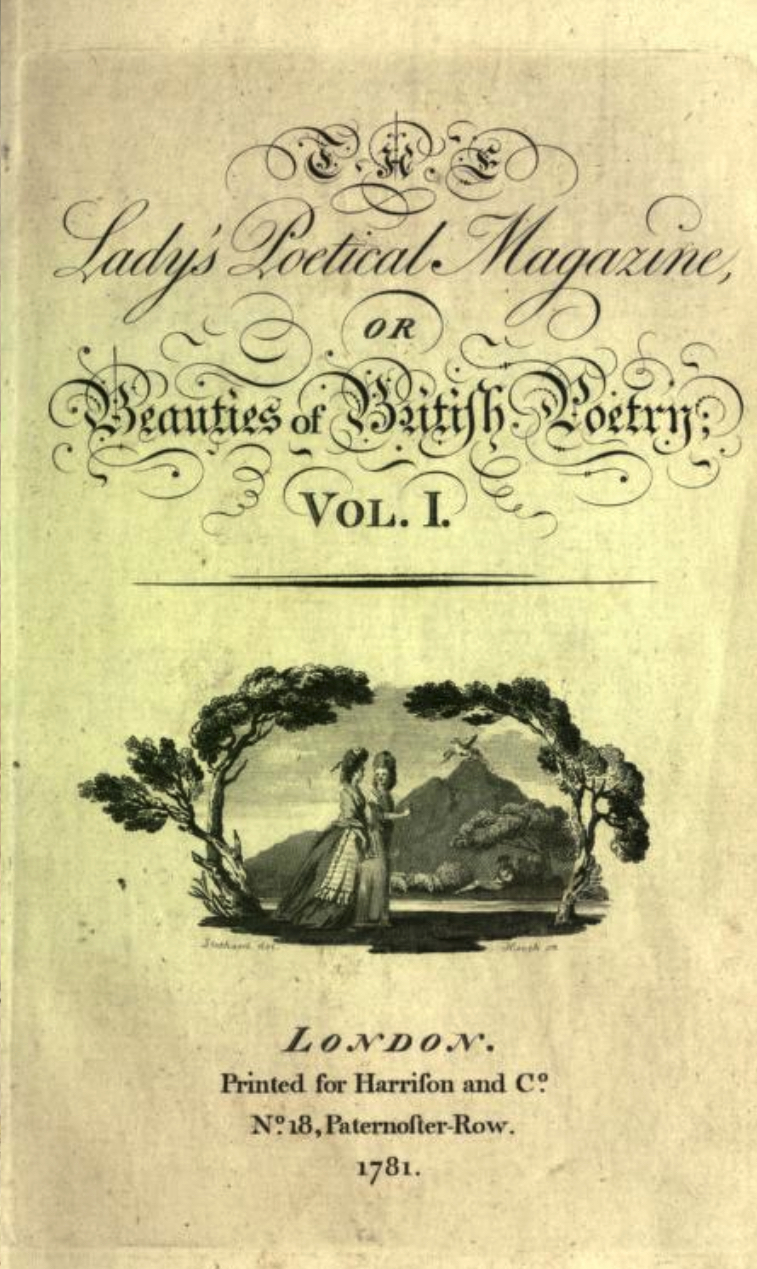
Roberts published two poems in The Lady's poetical magazine; or, Beauties of British poetry. 4 volumes. Vol. I. London: Harrison, 1781.

Eliza Roberts (fl. 1780–1788) was a British Romantic-era poet and translator of Rousseau.

== Life and work ==
Few details are known of her life. She was possibly the same Eliza Roberts, said to be "literary", who was mother to travel writer and poet Emma Roberts.

As "Miss Roberts", she published two poems, "Effusions of melancholy" and "On a supposed slight from a friend" in the Lady's Poetical Magazine, Or Beauties of British Poetry (1781-1782). In 1788 she published The Beauties of Rousseau. Selected by a Lady, translations of a series of excerpts from various works of Jean-Jacques Rousseau.

"Effusions of melancholy" and "On a supposed slight from a friend" were anthologized in the first known anthology of writing by women in English, Poems by Eminent Ladies (2nd edition, 1785, pp. 125–127).

== Bibliography ==
- Miss Roberts, "Effusions of melancholy", The Lady's poetical magazine; or, Beauties of British poetry Vol. I. London: Harrison, 1781, p. 443-444. (Etext, Internet Archive)
- Miss Roberts, "On a supposed slight from a friend", The Lady's poetical magazine; or, Beauties of British poetry Vol. II. London: Harrison, 1781, p. 189-190. (Etext, Internet Archive)
- The Beauties of Rousseau. Selected by a Lady. 2 Vols. London: printed for T. Hookham, 1788. ESTC T136489; ECCO.
