= Mary Barber (poet) =

Irish poet

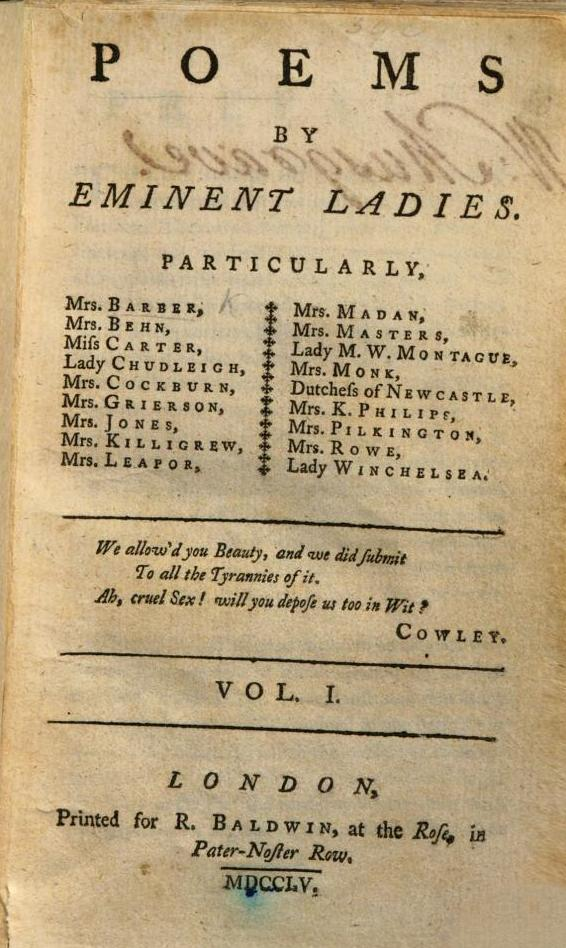
- Title page of first volume of Poems by Eminent Ladies 2 Vols. (London: R. Baldwin, 1755)
- Born: c. 1685
- Died: c. 1755 (aged 69–70)
- Occupation: Poet
- Spouse: Jonathan Barber
- Children: Constantine Barber (b. 1714); Rupert Barber (1719-1772)
- Writing career
- Pen name: Sapphira; M.B.

Mary Barber (c. 1685 – c. 1755), Irish poet, was a member of Swift's circle. She has been described as "a domestic, small-scale, early eighteenth-century poet of charm and intelligence (remembered particularly for her writing about her children), but also an incisive, often satirical commentator on social and gender issues".

== Life and work ==
Barber's parents are not known. She married Jonathan Barber, a woollen-draper in Capel Street, Dublin, with whom she had nine children, four of whom survived to adulthood. Her son Rupert Barber (1719–1772) was a crayon and miniature painter whose pastel portrait of Swift hangs in the National Portrait Gallery, London, and her son Constantine Barber (b. 1714) became president of the College of Physicians at Dublin.

She claimed, in the preface to her Poems (1734), that she wrote mainly in order to educate her children, but most commentators agree that she had a larger audience in view and was considerably engaged with intervening in wider social and political issues, as she was with "The Widow's Address" when she argued on behalf of the widow of an army officer. She also used her writing to advocate for her children, as she did with "The Hibernian Poetess's Address and Recommendation of Her Son, to her dear Cousin Esqu; L— M— of London".

Barber is an example of the eighteenth-century phenomenon of the "untutored poet, or 'natural genius'": an artist of unprepossessing background who achieved the patronage of literary or aristocratic notables. Swift named her as part of his "triumfeminate", along with poet and scholar Constantia Grierson and literary critic Elizabeth Sican, and maintained that she was a preeminent poet — "the best Poetess of both Kingdoms" — though this assessment was not universally shared. She moved into his circle and knew Laetitia Pilkington, who later became her harshest critic, Mary Delany, and poets Thomas Tickell and Elizabeth Rowe. Swift's patronage was a substantial support to Barber's career and her Poems on several occasions (1734) was successful. The subscription list for the volume was almost "without precedent for its resplendent length and illustrious contents, and it was moreover remarkable given Barber's otherwise pedestrian social standing as an ailing Irish housewife". There were over nine hundred subscribers including various aristocrats and a number of literary luminaries, notably Pope, Arbuthnot, Gay, Walpole, and of course Swift himself. She did not, however, achieve financial stability until at her request and in order to alleviate her financial distress, Swift gave her the English rights to his Complete Collection of Genteel and Ingenious Conversation (1738). Her health declined after the publication of her Poems and subsequent writing was sparse. She did publish some verses about the gout, from which she suffered for over two decades, in the Gentleman's Magazine in 1737. She died in or around 1755.

Barber's critical reputation benefited from the general re-appraisal of past writers that occurred in the 1970s–1980s with the emergence of feminist literary studies. Since then she has received scholarly attention as both a woman writer and "a significant figure" in Irish culture and eighteenth-century studies.

== Works ==
- "The Widow's Address" (Dublin, 1725)
- "A Tale Being an Addition to Mr. Gay's Fables" (Dublin, 1728)
- Contributor. Tunbrigialia, or, Tunbridge Miscellanies, for the Year 1730.
- Poems on several occasions (1st ed. sold by subscription, printed by Samuel Richardson, 1734; 2nd ed. London: C. Rivington, 1735; reissued 1736).
- Contributor. Poems by Eminent Ladies 2 Vols. (London: R. Baldwin, 1755): twenty-nine poems

== Etexts ==
- "Poems by Mrs. Mary Barber". Poems by Eminent Ladies Vol. I (London: R. Baldwin, 1755, pp. 1–50). (Google Books)
- Poems on several occasions (2nd ed. London: C. Rivington, 1735). (HathiTrust)

== Resources ==
- Backscheider, Paula. "Inverting the Image of Swift's 'Triumfeminate'". Journal for Early Modern Cultural Studies Vol. 4, No. 1, Women Writers of the Eighteenth Century (Spring/Summer 2004), pp. 37–71. <https://www.jstor.org/stable/27793777>
- Budd, Adam. "'Merit in Distress': The Troubled Success of Mary Barber". Review of English Studies, pp. 204 – 27.
- Coleborne, Bryan. "Barber, Mary (c.1685–1755)". Oxford Dictionary of National Biography. Ed. H. C. G. Matthew and Brian Harrison. Oxford: OUP, 2004. 1 Apr. 2007.
- Doody, Margaret Anne. "Swift Among the Women". The Yearbook of English Studies 18 (1998): 68—92.
- Elias, A. C. "Editing Minor Writers: The Case of Laeticia Pilkington and Mary Barber". 1650–1850. 3: 129–147.
- Fanning, Christopher. "The Voices of the Dependent Poet: the case of Mary Barber". Women's Writing 8.1 (2001): 81–97.
- Huber, Alexander. "Mary Barber". Eighteenth-Century Poetry Archive (ECPA), 2017. Web. 2 Nov. 2017.
- Lonsdale, Roger ed. "Mary Barber". Eighteenth-Century Women Poets. New York: Oxford University Press, 1989. 118–129.
- Stewart, Wendy. "The Poetical Trade of Favours: Swift, Mary Barber, and the Counterfeit Letters". Lumen, pp. 155 – 74.
- Strickland, Walter G. "A Dictionary of Irish Artists" vol. 1 (1913) p. 20.

== See also ==
- List of 18th-century British working-class writers
