= Taylor baronets =

Set index for Taylor baronets

There have been five baronetcies created for persons with the surname Taylor, one in the Baronetage of England, one in the Baronetage of Great Britain and three in the Baronetage of the United Kingdom. Only one creation is extant as of 2026.

- Taylor baronets of Park House (1665)
- Taylor baronets of Lysson Hall (1778)
- Taylor baronets of Hollycombe (1828)
- Taylor baronets of Kennington (1917): see Stuart Taylor Baronets
- Taylor baronets of Cawthorne (1963): see Sir William Johnson Taylor, 1st Baronet (1902–1972)

== See also ==
- Worsley-Taylor baronets
- Stuart Taylor baronets
- Taylour baronets
