= Sir Thomas Taylor, 2nd Baronet, of Park House =

English politician

Sir Thomas Taylor, 2nd Baronet (1657–1696), of Park House, Maidstone and Shadoxhurst, Kent, was an English politician.

== Career ==
He was a Member of the Parliament of England (MP) for Maidstone in 1689–1696.

Baronetage of England
Preceded by Thomas Taylor	Baronet (of Park House); 1665–1696	Succeeded by Thomas Taylor
