= Elizabeth Sican =

Irish literary critic

- Occupation: literary critic
- Spouse: John Sican
- Relatives: John Sican (son)
- Writing career
- Pen name: Psyche
- Language: English

Elizabeth Sican was an Irish literary critic. She was part of Jonathan Swift's "triumfeminate," along with Mary Barber and Constantia Grierson.

== Life ==
Most of what is known about Sican comes via her connection to Swift. She was "a prosperous grocer's wife from Essex St." Sican was her married name, and she had at least one child, named John after his father, who was in turn a sometime author. In a letter to Alexander Pope in 1729, Swift describes her as "the wife of a Surly rich husband who checks her [poetic] vein."

== Swift's circles ==
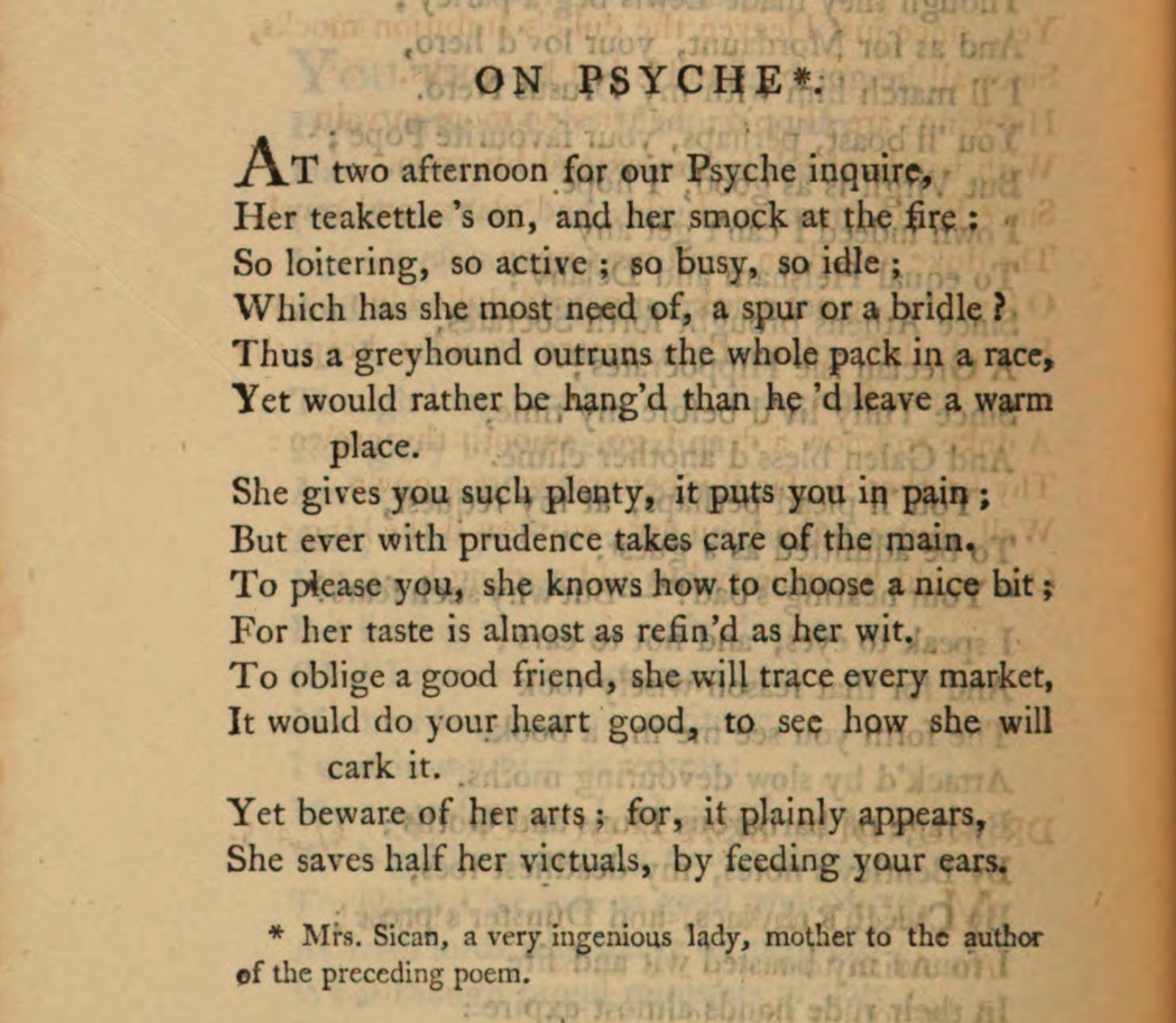
Jonathan Swift, "On Psyche," The Works of the Rev. Jonathan Swift, Vol. 8. London, c. 1733, rpt. 1808.

Swift was part of the Scriblerus Club, a famous literary circle in London along with other celebrated writers, notably Pope, John Gay, John Arbuthnot, Henry St. John and Thomas Parnell. But he also became part of a smaller circle in Dublin, composed of local literary women. Mary Barber, Constantia Grierson, Laetitia Pilkington and Elizabeth Sican were all members, and this group of "self-made women" was well-established before Swift met the Barbers in 1728. Of Sican, he wrote to Pope: "She has a very good tast of Poetry, hath read much, and as I hear hath writ one or two things with applause, which I never saw, except about six lines she sent me unknown, with a piece of Sturgeon, some Years ago on my birth day." In another letter in 1735, again to Pope, Swift writes that Sican "hath more sense, wit & Knowledge than the whole sex here could make up among them."

Swift wrote "On Psyche" about her:

AT two afternoon for our Psyche inquire,
Her teakettle's on, and her smock at the fire:
So loitering, so active; so busy, so idle;
Which has she most need of, a spur or a bridle?
Thus a greyhound outruns the whole pack in a race,
Yet would rather be hang'd than he'd leave a warm place.
She gives you such plenty, it puts you in pain;
But ever with prudence takes care of the main.
To please you, she knows how to choose a nice bit;
For her taste is almost as refin'd as her wit.
To oblige a good friend, she will trace every market,
It would do your heart good, to see how she will cark it.
Yet beware of her arts; for, it plainly appears,
She saves half her victuals, by feeding your ears.

Sican's response, if it was recorded, has not survived. None of her writings are extant.

== See also ==
- Jonathan Swift
- Scriblerus Club
