= Mary Scott (poet) =

English poet

Mary Scott (born 19 July 1751, South Petherton, Somerset died 10 June 1793, Somerset), who became Mary Taylor after her marriage, was an English poet originating from Milborne Port, Somerset. Notable for her literary contributions, Scott authored "The Female Advocate" in 1774, a work advocating for women's participation in writing and literature.

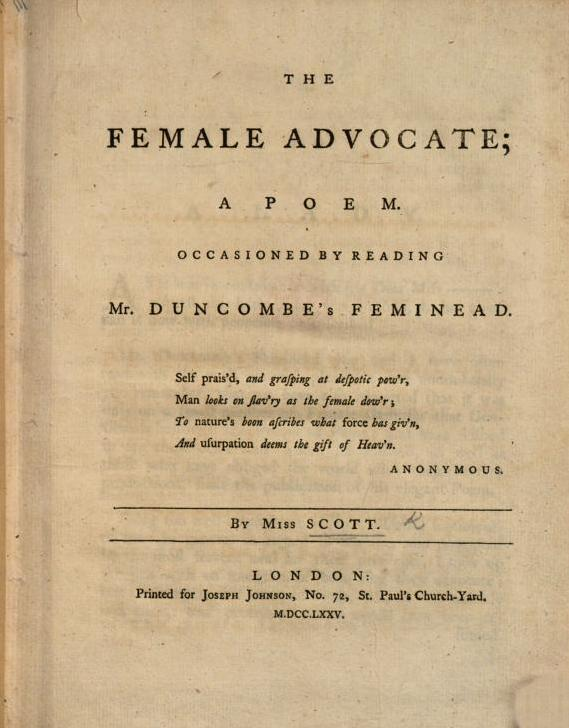
Title page of Mary Scott's The Female Advocate (1774)

== Life and work ==
Scott's father was a linen draper. Not much else is known about her life before the publication of The Female Advocate, dedicated to her friend Mary Steele, in 1774. Scott credits John Duncombe's The Feminead (1754), a poem in praise of the accomplishments of women writers, as the inspiration for her own poem.

The poem consists of 522 lines of rhyming couplets; it supplements Duncombe's, and discusses more contemporary writers. Among the poets referred to are Lucy Aikin, Anna Laetitia Barbauld, Mary Chudleigh, Sarah Fielding, Anne Killigrew, Catharine Macaulay, Catherine Parr, Helen Maria Williams, and Phillis Wheatley.

Men are also praised: Duncombe; Rev. Thomas Seward, author of The Female Right to Literature, in a Letter to a Young Lady from Florence (1766); William Steele, for his support of his daughter's writing; and Richard Pulteney (1730–1801), a friend and physician who encouraged Scott.

She began a correspondence with Anna Seward, whose father she had praised in The Female Advocate, and Seward's published letters are the source of much that is known of Scott's life. In the preface the Advocate, Scott mentions ongoing ill-health and indeed seems to have been a semi-invalid. She lived with her parents until she was in her thirties, caring for her ailing mother until she died in 1787. Her father died in 1788, and Scott was free after over a decade of courtship to marry John Taylor, a match her mother had opposed when alive.

Scott was part of a circle of Protestant dissenters and was deeply religious; consequently, when her husband, who had formerly convinced her to convert to Unitarianism, embraced Quakerism, she underwent considerable strain. Scott gave birth to a daughter in 1789 and a son in 1791 (her son, John Edward Taylor, went on to found the Manchester Guardian). She died late in her third pregnancy, in 1793, at the age of forty-one.

== Works ==
- Scott, Mary (1775). The Female Advocate; a poem occasioned by reading Mr. Duncombe's Feminead. London: Joseph Johnson.
- "Verses Addressed to Miss Seward, on the Publication of her Monody on Major André," The Gentleman's Magazine (June 1783)
- The Messiah. A Poem, in Two Parts. Published for the benefit of the General Hospital at Bath ([Bath]: R. Cruttwell, 1788.)

== Bibliography ==
- Blain, Virginia, et al., eds. The Feminist Companion to Literature in English. New Haven and London: Yale UP, 1990.
- Buck, Claire, ed. The Bloomsbury Guide to Women's Literature. Prentice Hall, 1992.
- Lonsdale, Roger ed. Eighteenth-Century Women Poets. New York: Oxford University Press, 1989.
- Mullan, John. “Scott, Mary (1751/2–1793).” Oxford Dictionary of National Biography. Ed. H. C. G. Matthew and Brian Harrison. Oxford: OUP, 2004. 16 Apr. 2007.
- Sitter, John, ed. (2001). The Cambridge Companion to Eighteenth-Century Poetry. Cambridge University Press. ISBN 9780521658850.
- Todd, Janet, ed. British Women Writers: a critical reference guide. London: Routledge, 1989.
