= Elizabeth Singer Rowe =

English poet and writer (1674–1737)

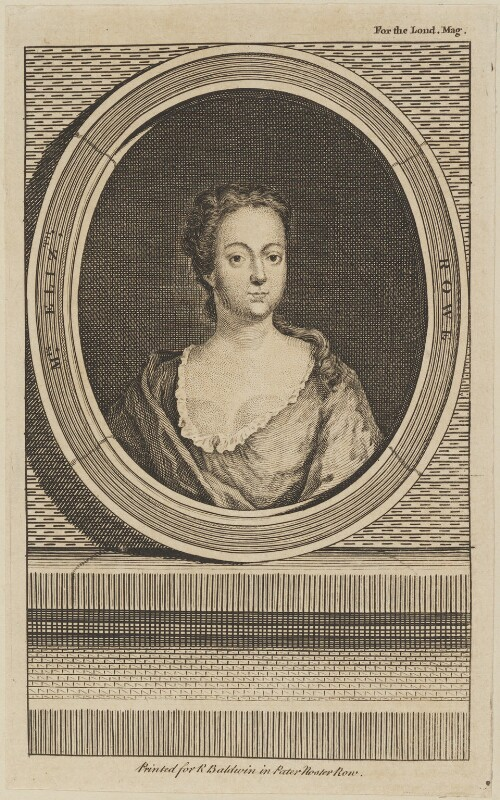
- Etching of Elizabeth Singer Rowe, c. 1750—1752, printed for Richard Baldwin (NPG)
- Born: 11 September 1674; Ilchester, Somerset
- Died: 20 February 1737 (aged 62)
- Resting place: Rook Lane Congregational Church
- Occupations: Poet, essayist and fiction writer
- Spouse: Thomas Rowe
- Relatives: Elizabeth Portnell (mothere); Walter Singer (father); Anne Finch (aunt)
- Writing career
- Pen name: Philomela; the Pindarick Lady
- Notable work: Friendship in Death (1728)

Elizabeth Singer Rowe (née Singer, 1674–1737) was an English poet, essayist and fiction writer called "the ornament of her sex and age" and the "Heavenly Singer". She was among 18th-century England's most widely read writers. She wrote mainly religious poetry, but her best-known work, Friendship in Death (1728), is a Jansenist miscellany of imaginary letters from the dead to the living. Despite a posthumous reputation as a pious, bereaved recluse, Rowe corresponded widely and was involved in local concerns at Frome in her native Somerset. She remained popular into the 19th century on both sides of the Atlantic and in translation. Though little read today, scholars have called her stylistically and thematically radical for her time.

== Biography ==
Born on 11 September 1674 at Ilchester, Somerset, she was the eldest daughter of Elizabeth Portnell and Walter Singer, a dissenting minister. Her parents met while Portnell was doing charity work in the prison at Ilchester where Singer was being held with other Dissenters. He left the ministry after marrying Portnell and became a clothier. In her youth, Elizabeth was "doted on by her father" and well educated. She was also taught Nonconformist or Dissenting doctrine: women were allowed to speak in public, and to participate in choosing ministers and admitting new church members; she participated vigorously in local church affairs. Her father also inculcated her interests in literature, music and painting, and she is thought to have attended a boarding school.

In the biography affixed to the front of her posthumously published Miscellaneous Works, her brother-in-law, Theophilus Rowe, described her: "Mrs. Rowe was not a regular beauty, yet she possessed a large measure of the charms of her sex. She was of a moderate stature, her hair of a fine auburn colour, and her eyes of a darkish grey inclining to blue, and full of fire. Her complexion was exquisitely fair, and a natural rosy blush glowed in her cheeks. She spoke gracefully, and her voice was exceeding sweet and harmonious, and perfectly suited to that gentle language which always flowed from her lips."

Rowe's mother died when she was about 18, and her father moved the family to Egford Farm, Frome, Somerset, where she was tutored in French and Italian by Henry Thynne, son of the first Viscount Weymouth of Longleat, Wiltshire. The connections Rowe made at Longleat benefited her literary career and initiated a lifelong friendship with Frances Thynne, the viscount's daughter. Thynne's great-aunt, Anne Finch, wrote a coterie poem that mentions Philomela (Rowe) around 1713, and the Thynnes and Finch became her patrons. Although courted by John Dunton, Matthew Prior and Isaac Watts, she married the poet and biographer Thomas Rowe, 13 years her junior, in 1710. Their marriage was reportedly happy, but short: Thomas died of tuberculosis in 1715. After his death, Rowe left London and returned to Frome and joined her father in Rook Lane House, where a plaque in her memory has been placed.

Rowe's father died in 1719 leaving her a considerable inheritance, half the annual income of which she gave to charity. Rowe once wrote, "My letters ought to be call'd Epistles from the Dead to the Living," and she carefully put her papers in order before her death, even writing farewell letters to friends in what seems "to have been conceived as part of a posthumous 'good-death' print event staged" by Rowe herself. She died on 20 February 1737 of apoplexy and was interred with her father in his grave at Rook Lane Congregational Church.

== Literary works ==
Something of a prodigy, Rowe began writing at the age of 12, probably without her parents' knowledge. At 19 she began a "platonic" correspondence with John Dunton, a bookseller and founder of the Athenian Society, which was the source material for Dunton's "outrageous," "hilarious" and "sinister", 61-page summary of his relationship with Rowe entitled "The Double Courtship." Between 1693 and 1696 she was the principal contributor of poetry to Dunton's The Athenian Mercury, but later regretted her affiliation with him, as "a print-world impresario" whose adaptions of masculine gallantry to commercial print were "ridiculed" by the literati.

Many of these poems were reprinted in Poems on Several Occasions, also published by Dunton. During this time, she wrote in imitation of Pindar under the pseudonyms Philomela and the Pindarick Lady, Pindar's approach to writing odes on abstractions was a popular verse form in the late 17th century.

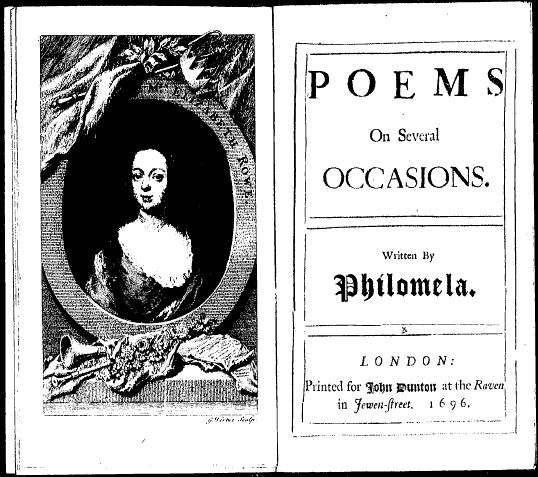
Frontispiece and title page of Poems on Several Occasions, 1696.

Poems on Several Occasions (1696)

Written under the pseudonym Philomela, this collection was published by John Dunton when Rowe was twenty-two.

Divine Hymns and Poems on Several Occasions (1704)

Published in 1704, Rowe was the featured poet in this collection of didactic religious poetry, which also included Richard Blackmore, John Dennis and John Norris.

Poems on Several Occasions (1717) This collection contains pastorals, hymns, an imitation of Anne Killigrew, a "vehement defence of women's right to poetry," in which Elizabeth Johnson holds up Rowe as a champion of women, "over'rul'd by the Tyranny of the Prouder Sex." This volume included one of her best known poems, "On the Death of Mr. Thomas Rowe", an impassioned poem which she wrote in response to the untimely death of her husband. The poem is said to have been an inspiration for Pope's Eloisa to Abelard (1720), and he included it in the second edition. In it she wrote, "For thee at once I from the world retire,/To feed in silent shades a hopeless fire." She kept her word and retired to her father's house in Frome.

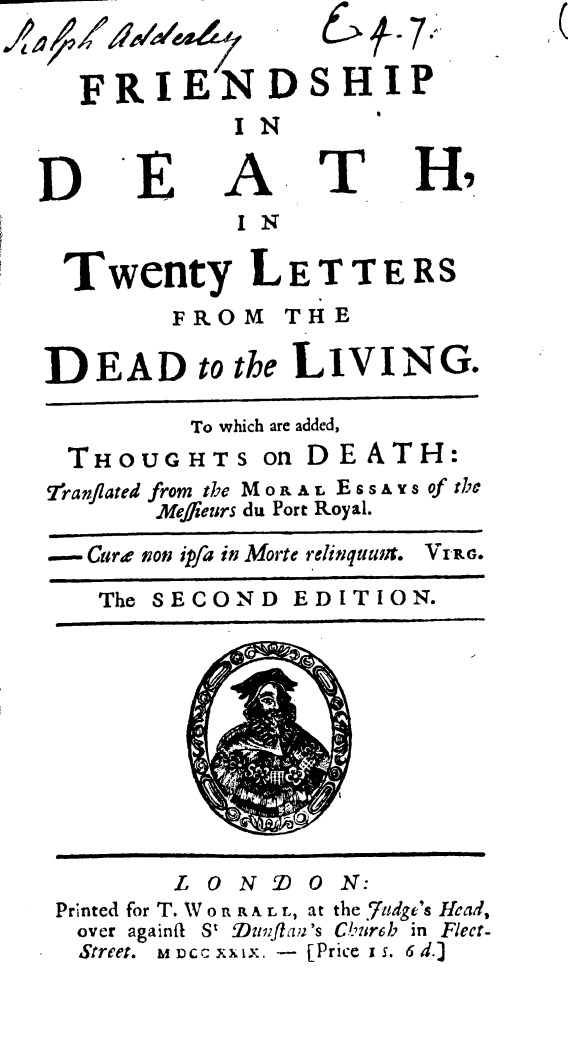
Title page for Friendship in Death, second ed. 1729

Friendship in Death, in Twenty Letters From the Dead to the Living (1728)

Undoubtedly her most popular work, Friendship in Death, first published in 1728, went through at least 79 editions by 1825 and another ten by 1840. In the 18th century, editions of this work consistently outnumbered Defoe's Robinson Crusoe and Richardson's Clarissa and the gap grew wider as the century progressed. The work consists of imaginary letters from virtuous friends and loved ones, including a two-year-old child to his grieving mother, who have died, gone to heaven and wish to impart spiritual advice, mainly in the interest of making sure that the souls of friends and loved ones go to heaven. The subject matter of the letters consists mainly of moral dilemmas and contemporary issues; many of the letters are reminiscent of moral essays, while others are closer to the situations depicted in novels. Here Rowe seems to be conducting a campaign against the libertinism found in amatory fiction. In the preface, Rowe states her didactic intent, "The Drift of these Letters is, to impress the Notion of the Soul's Immortality; without which, all Virtue and Religion, with their Temporal and Eternal good Consequences, must fall to the Ground." According to the spirits, death is to be welcomed and not feared since the soul experiences bliss in heaven.

Rowe's most immediate and well known literary model for Friendship in Death was Tom Brown's Letters from the Dead to the Living (1702) although Brown's work features famous men who make witty comments both on infamous contemporaries and hell. Friendship in Death is informed by the epistolary tradition, apparition literature, patchwork literature, and Jansenist theology, and influenced many subsequent protracted death scenes such as in Samuel Richardson's Clarissa and Sarah Fielding's The Adventures of David Simple. Volume the Last (1753).

Letters on Various Occasions, in Prose and Verse (1729) This collection includes the first part of Letters Moral and Entertaining.

Letters Moral and Entertaining (1729–32)

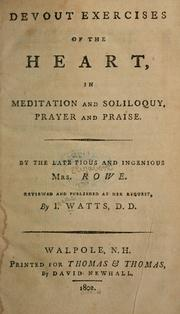
The title page of Elizabeth Singer Rowe's "Devout Exercises of the Heart in Meditation and Soliloquy, Prayer and Praise," originally published in 1737 (1802 edition).

Letters Moral and Entertaining was a three-part series of fictionalized letters focusing on love, marriage and death. Perhaps best described as a didactic miscellany, this work also contained religious poetry, pastorals, translations of Tasso and actual letters from the correspondence between Rowe and Lady Hertford. Part I, 1729, was published as a "sequel of sorts" to Friendship in Death and represents older forms of the coterie epistolary exchange of manuscript culture within the newer print culture.

The History of Joseph (1736) Rowe's The History of Joseph (1736) is an extended narrative poem in the tradition of English religious epics such as Milton's Paradise Lost and an allegorical paraphrase that adds detail to the Old Testament story of Joseph. Rowe's immediate predecessors were Richard Blackmore's A Paraphrase of the Book of Job (1700) and Matthew Prior's Solomon, or the Vanity of the World (1718). Joseph was translated into German influencing the Swiss poet Johann Jacob Bodmer and Friedrick Klopstock, a German poet whose biblical epic Messias (1749) was also influenced by Paradise Lost. In this work, she continues to critique libertinism as well as pagan mythology and priestcraft celebrating a hero who exudes the virtue of chastity as he resists the temptations of Potiphar's wife, called Sabrina by Rowe, who uses charms, astrology and the philosophical arguments of libertinism to try to seduce him.

Philomela: or, Poems by Mrs. Elizabeth Singer {now Rowe} (1737) This is a reprint of the 1696 Poems on Several Occasions.

Devout Exercises of the Heart in Meditation and Soliloquy, Prayer and Praise (1737) Following her death and according to her wishes, Isaac Watts revised and published her religious meditations in this work.

The Miscellaneous Works in Prose and Verse of Mrs Elizabeth Rowe (1739) Published posthumously by Theophilus Rowe, this collection was prefaced by a highly complimentary biography and no less than twelve poetic tributes.

== Critical reception ==
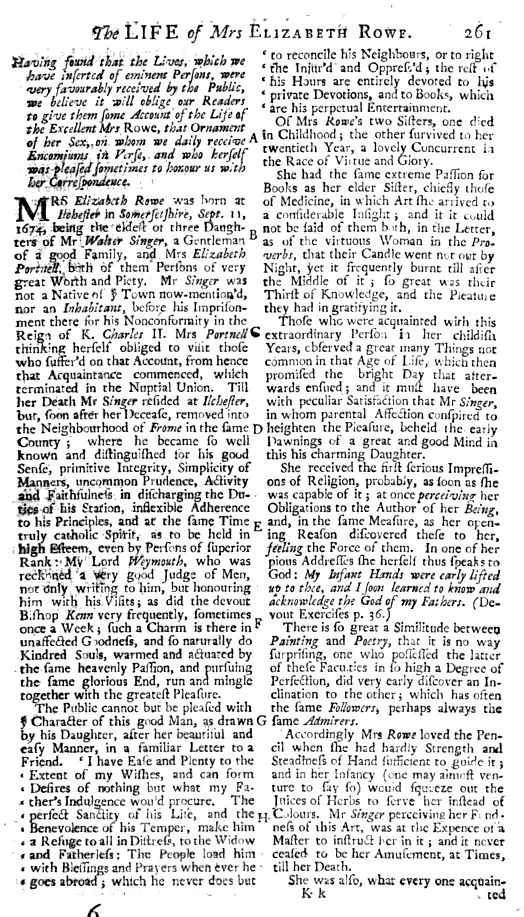
The article "The Life of Mrs. Elizabeth Row" which was published in "The Gentleman's Magazine" in May 1739.

The 18th-century literary critic and lexicographer Samuel Johnson had praise for Rowe and wrote in a Miscellanies review that essayists in the collection "seem generally to have imitated, or tried to imitate, the copiousness and luxuriance of Mrs. Rowe. This, however, is not all their praise; they have laboured to add to her brightness of imagery, her purity of sentiment" and he gave her credit for a mastery of style which used the "ornaments of romance in the decoration of religion". Eighteenth-century English writer and bluestocking Elizabeth Carter lauded Rowe's "happy elegance of thought," describing her verse as "refin'd by virtue" with "powerful strains [that] wake the nobler passions of the soul." Rowe's contemporaries considered her the "virtuous successor of Katherine Phillips."

After her death, other writers and the public emphasized her virtuous reputation. In 1739 The Gentleman's Magazine wrote about Rowe in a three-part series, calling her the “Ornament of her Sex." George Ballard, 18th-century literary antiquarian and biographer, held up Rowe as the epitome of his domesticated model of the virtuous and modest, ideal woman writer in his highly influential Memoirs of Several Ladies of Great Britain: who have been celebrated for their writings or skill in the learned languages, arts and sciences (1752). John Duncombe's Feminiad (1754) praised both her character and her writing. As late as 1803 an anonymous writer suggested that Rowe represented “Virtue and all her genuine beauty [that should] recommend her to the choice and admiration of a rising generation." She became a "cultural authority", influencing later women writers and 19th-century Christian female activists. Her works were reprinted nearly annually until 1855, out of print by 1860, and in 1897 she was not even mentioned in A Dictionary of English Authors; her reputation had gone from "exemplar" and "muse" to "antiquarian curiosity."

Recent scholars have interpreted Rowe as a pivotal figure in the development of the English novel: Rowe borrowed stock characters and situations from the late 17th and early 18th-century French and Italian romances popular in England, transforming the outward struggles to save the body of the heroine from seducers, to saving the mind and soul of the heroine from the corrupt world through the virtuous self-control that results from contemplation, thus sealing the plot trajectory of subsequent fiction as evidenced in later novels such as Eliza Haywood's Betsy Thoughtless, Samuel Richardson's Clarissa and Frances Burney's Cecilia. The proto-feminist and amatory significance of Rowe's literary contribution continues to be reassessed against her moral and didactic themes.

== Bibliography ==
- Poems on Several Occasions: Written by Philomela (John Dunton, 1696)
- Contributor, Tonson's Poetical Miscellanies: the Fifth Part (1704)
- Divine hymns and poems on several occasions ... by Philomela, and several other ingenious persons (1704; 2nd e., A Collection of Divine Hymns and Poems [1709])
- "On the death of Mr Thomas Rowe," Lintot's Poems on Several Occasions (1717); appended to 2nd edition of Alexander Pope's Eloisa to Abelard (1720)
- Friendship in Death: in Twenty Letters from the Dead to the Living (1728)
- Letters Moral and Entertaining (1729–32), a three-part series
- The History of Joseph (1736, 8 books; expanded 10-book edition published posthumously, 1739)
- Philomela: Poems by Mrs. Elizabeth Singer [now Rowe] of Frome (1737 [i.e. 1736]), pub. by Edmund Curll without consent
- Devout Exercises of the Heart in Meditation and Soliloquy, Prayer and Praise (1737)
- The Miscellaneous Works in Prose and Verse of Mrs Elizabeth Rowe (2 vols, 1739)
