= Thomas Amory (author) =

Irish unitarian writer (c. 1691–1788)

- Born: c. 1691
- Died: 25 November 1788 (aged 97)
- Occupation: Author

Thomas Amory (c. 1691 – 25 November 1788) was a writer with an Irish background. He is thought to have lived in Dublin and later in Westminster.

== Polymath ==
In 1755 Amory published Memoirs containing the lives of several ladies of Great Britain, a History of Antiquities and Observations on the Christian Religion. This was followed by the Life of John Buncle, Esq. in 1756, which was practically a continuation: Vol. I, 1756 and Vol. II, 1766.

These works are those of a polymath, covering philology, natural science, theology and other subjects, unsystematically, but with occasional originality and felicity of diction.

== Private life ==
Amory was a keen Unitarian. He was also a renowned eccentric, with a peculiar appearance and the manner of a gentleman. He scarcely ever stirred abroad except at dusk. He died at the age of 97, probably in London.

== Notes ==
- The information here is consistent with the entry in The Oxford Companion to English Literature, ed. Sir Paul Harvey, 4th e. (Oxford: Oxford University Press, 1967).
