= Mary Monck =

Irish poet

- Born: Mary Molesworth; 1677?
- Died: 1715 (aged 37–38); Bath, England
- Known for: poet and translator
- Parent(s): Robert Molesworth, 1st Viscount Molesworth, and Letitia Coote

Mary Monck (née Molesworth; 1677? – 1715) was a celebrated beauty, poet and translator.

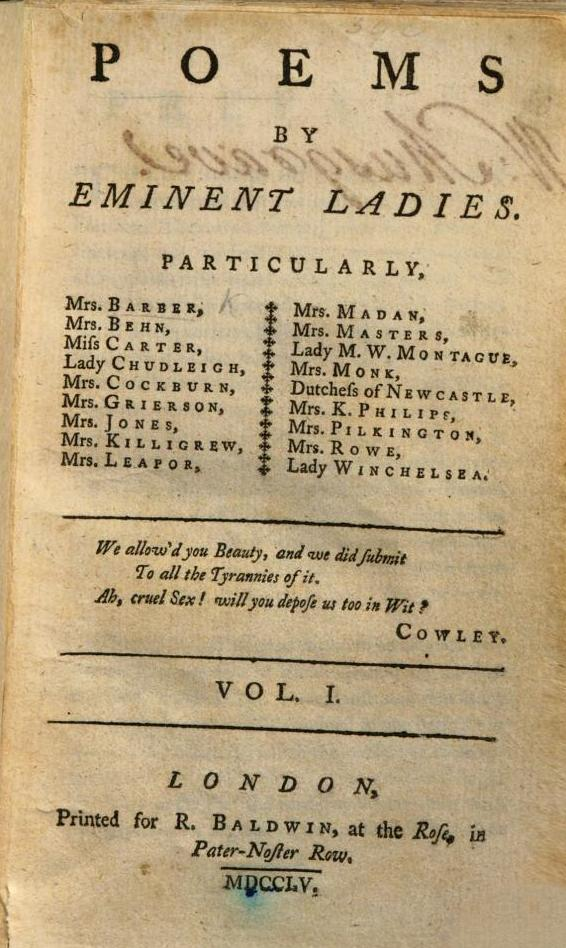
Title page of first volume of Poems by Eminent Ladies 2 Vols. (London: R. Baldwin, 1755)

== Life ==
She was the second daughter of the 17 children of Robert Molesworth, 1st Viscount Molesworth, and Letitia Coote, third daughter of Richard, Lord Coloony, and sister of Richard, Earl of Bellamont. There are no records of her early life, but it is believed that she was self-educated and used the family's extensive library to learn Latin, Italian, and Spanish.

She became the first wife of George Monck of St Stephen's Green, Dublin. The couple appear to have struggled financially, with Monck asking her father for assistance at times, as well as issues with her husband's mental instability. Her father wrote on 16 July 1712: "We are bleeding, physicing and dieting George Monk. He is now very sober, but by fits starts out and then ‘tis always quarrelsome and withal dangerous." The couple separated for a time, as her sister records that she was living with her children in lodgings in 1714.

Monck had two daughters (the eldest, Sarah Monck, died in 1739) and one son, Henry Stanley Monck of St Stephen's Green, who died in 1745.

Monck died at Bath in 1715 of consumption.

== Works ==
Some poems were published posthumously by her father shortly after her death under the title of Marinda. Poems and Translations upon several occasions, London, 1716, 8vo. The volume was dedicated to the princess of Wales, later Queen Caroline. Also included were poems from friends addressing Monck as Marinda, praising her translation skills and place in the "literary coterie". The volume contained her translations of Della Casa, Guarini, Petrarch, Quevedo and Tasso, along with her own poems, epigrams, songs, and odes, may of which were satirical. Her father wrote that he found "most of them in her Scrittore after her Death, written with her own Hand, little expecting, and as little desiring the Publick shou'd have any Opportunity either of Applauding or Condemning them."

On her deathbed she wrote verses to her husband, which are not included in her works, but which were printed in George Colman and Bonnell Thornton's anthology Poems by Eminent Ladies. Some critics consider Verses written on her death-bed at Bath to her husband at London to be her most famous and moving work, expressing her love for her husband and the relief she felt while escaping the long and painful illness she was suffering from.
