= Thomas Coxeter =

Thomas Coxeter (1689–1747) was an English literary antiquary.

== Life ==
Born at Lechlade in Gloucestershire on 20 September 1689, he was educated at Coxwell, Berkshire, and at Magdalen School in Oxford. On 7 July 1705 he was entered a commoner of Trinity College, Oxford. Having completed his course, he came to London to practise the civil law; but in 1710, on the death of his patron, Sir John Cook, dean of arches, he abandoned the legal profession and devoted himself to literary and antiquarian pursuits.

In 1747 he was appointed secretary to a society for the encouragement of an essay towards a complete English history. He died of a fever on 19 April 1747, and was buried in the chapel yard of the Royal Hospital of Bridewell. His daughter was supported by Samuel Johnson; she died in 1807.

== Works ==
An elegy in a book entitled Astræa Lacrimans, published anonymously in 1710, was probably written by Coxeter. In 1720 he contributed one or more of the indexes to John Hudson's edition of Josephus; and in 1739 he published a new edition of the Life of Bishop Fisher often attributed to Richard Hall, its translator into Latin.

Coxeter was a collector of old English plays, and allowed the Shakespearean editor, Theobald, to make use of them. He also assisted Joseph Ames in the preparation of Typographical Antiquities. In 1744 he circulated proposals for an annotated edition of the dramatic works of Thomas May, but the scheme was never carried out. In the prospectus he said that, having determined to "revive the best of our old plays, faithfully collated with all the editions that could be found in a search of above thirty years", he "happened to communicate his scheme to one who now invades it" — the reference being to Robert Dodsley, whose Select Collection of Old Plays appeared in 1744. In the same prospectus he promised an edition (which was never published) of the works of Thomas Sackville, Lord Buckhurst.

Coxeter's manuscript collections were largely used in Theophilus Cibber's Lives of the Poets and in Thomas Warton's History of English Poetry. His statements are to be received with caution, for he invented titles of imaginary books. In 1759, a four-volume edition of Philip Massinger's works appeared, "collated by Mr. Coxeter"; it was criticised by William Gifford. Others – the Edinburgh Review in 1808, and contemporary scholars – have been more complimentary.
