= John Duncombe (writer) =

British writer and clergyman (1729–1786)

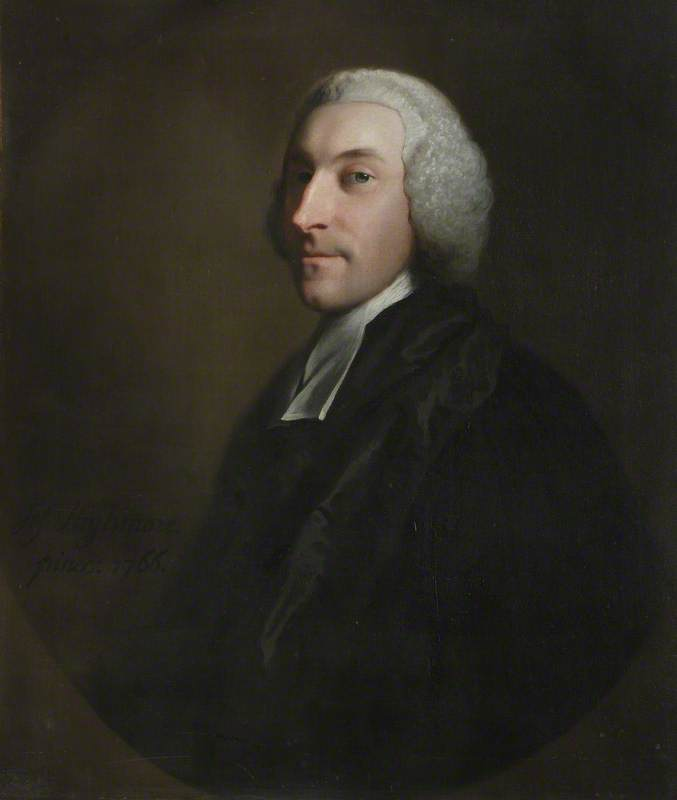
John Duncombe (1729–1786), Poet and Preacher, Fellow (1750–1753), painting by Joseph Highmore

John Duncombe (29 September 1729 – 19 January 1786) was an English clergyman and writer.

He studied at Corpus Christi College, Cambridge, where he became a fellow. He contributed to the Gentleman's Magazine under the pseudonym Crito, was a well-known poet, and wrote in 1754 a celebration of British women poets, The Feminead. He was married to the poet Susanna Duncombe (née Highmore).

== Life ==
Duncombe was born in London on 29 September 1729, the only child of the author and playwright William Duncombe and his wife Elizabeth née Hughes. He was educated at two schools in Essex, before entering, on 1 July 1745, Corpus Christi College, Cambridge, where he proceeded B.A. in 1748 and M.A. in 1752. He was later elected a fellow of his college, and in 1753 was ordained at Kew Chapel by John Thomas, the bishop of Peterborough. On the recommendation of Archbishop Thomas Herring, he was appointed to the curacy of Sundridge in Kent.

Duncombe subsequently became assistant-preacher at St Anne's Church, Soho. He was in succession chaplain to Samuel Squire, bishop of St David's, and to John Boyle, 5th Earl of Cork. In 1757 Archbishop Herring, a friend, presented him to the united livings of St Andrew and St Mary Bredan, in Canterbury. He was later made one of the Six Preachers in the cathedral; and in 1773 obtained from Archbishop Frederick Cornwallis the living of Herne, near Canterbury. The archbishop also appointed him master of St John's Hospital, Canterbury, and gave him a chaplaincy, which enabled him to hold his two livings.

Duncombe died at Canterbury on 19 January 1786 and was buried there.

== Personal life ==
In 1761 Duncombe married Susanna Highmore, a childhood friend, and a poet and artist in her own right. She and an only daughter survived him.

== Works ==
Among Duncombe's many poems, the best known were:

- An Evening's Contemplation in a College, a parody of Thomas Gray's Elegy in a Country Churchyard (1753)
- The Feminead (1754)
- Translations from Horace (1766–67).

He wrote numerous occasional pieces, such as On a Lady sending the Author a Ribbon for his Watch.

As an antiquarian, he wrote:

- Historical Description of Canterbury Cathedral, 1772
- A translation and abridgment of John Battely's Antiquities of Richborough and Reculver 1774
- History and Antiquities of Reculver and Herne, and of the Three Archiepiscopal Hospitals at and near Canterbury, contributed to John Nichols's Bibliotheca Topographica Britannica, vols 1 and 4 (1780).

He edited:

- Letters from Italy of John Boyle, 5th Earl of Cork, 1773–74
- Letters by several Eminent Persons deceased, including the Correspondence of J. Hughes, Esq., 1773
- Letters from the late Archbishop Herring to William Duncombe, Esq., deceased, 1777
- Select Works of the Emperor Julian, 1784

He also published several sermons.
