= Patin =

Patin may refer to:

== People ==
- Charles Patin (1633–1693), French physician and numismatist
- Charlotte-Catherine Patin, 17th- and 18th-century French writer and art critic
- Gabrielle-Charlotte Patin, 17th-century French numismatist
- Guy Patin (1601–1672), French doctor and man of letters
- Henri Patin (1793–1876), French writer and translator from ancient Greek and Latin
- Jacques Patin (died 1587), French painter, decorator, illustrator and engraver
- Madeleine Patin (1610–1682), French moralist
- Mathias Patin (born 1974), French volleyball player
- Sylvie Patin (born 1951), French art historian and conservator-restorer

== Places ==
- Patin, Burkina Faso

== Animals ==
- Basa (fish), a type of catfish also known as patin

== See also ==
- Pattin
