= Patijn =

Patijn is a Dutch surname belonging to a political family in the Netherlands.

== List of people with the surname ==
- Jacob Adriaan Patijn
- Mariëtte Patijn
- Michiel Patijn
- Schelto Patijn

== See also ==
- Patin
