= Gabrielle-Charlotte Patin =

French painter

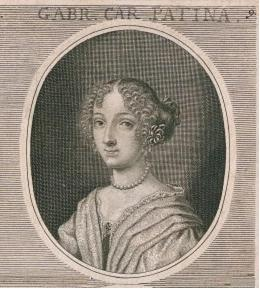
Gabrielle-Charlotte Patin, engraving by Leonhard Heckenauer

Gabrielle-Charlotte Patin (1666–1751) was a French numismatist, writer and painter during the 17th century.

She was born in Paris. She was the granddaughter of medical doctor and letter writer Guy Patin, daughter of medical doctor and numismatist Charles Patin and moralist writer Madeleine Patin, as well as sister of the writer and art critic Charlotte-Catherine Patin. Gabrielle-Charlotte Patin published a Latin work on Phoenician numismatics: De Phœnice in numismate imperatoris Caracallæ expressa epistola (Venise, 1683, in-4°).

Patin was made, as were her sister and parents, a member of the Galileiana Academy of Arts and Science under the name "Diserte". At this academy, she gave the panegyric lecture on Louis XIV in 1685. She died in Padua, Italy.

== See also ==
- Numismatics
- 17th-century French literature
