= Marie-Catherine de Villedieu =

French writer

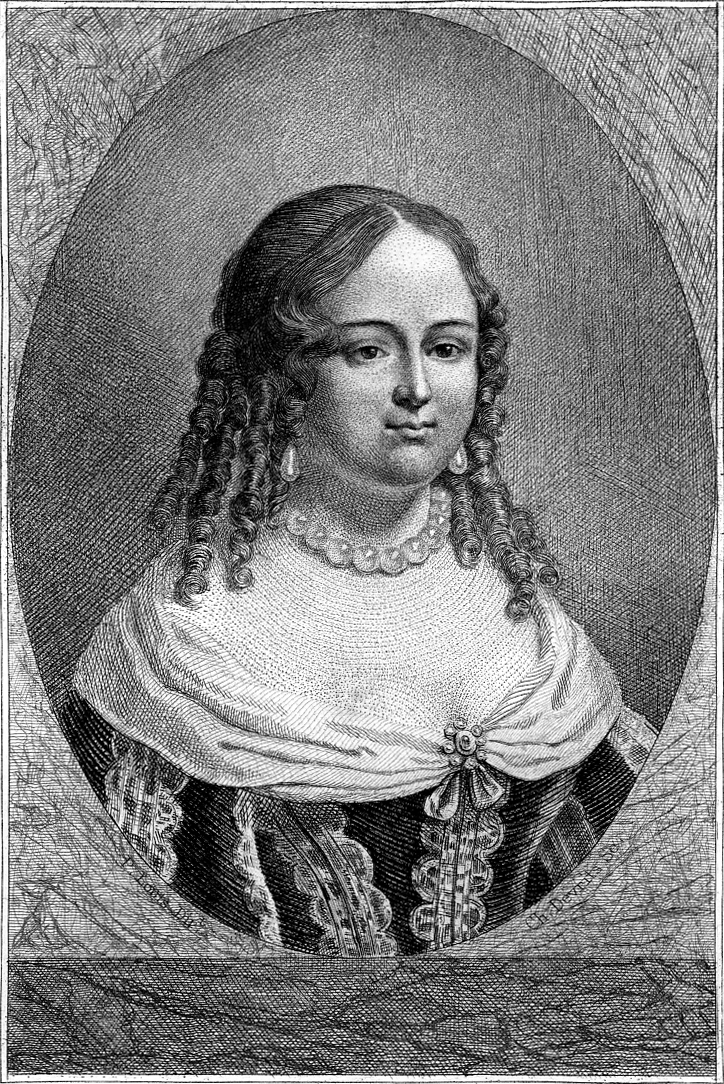
- Marie-Catherine de Villedieu
- Born: Marie-Catherine Desjardins; 1640; Alençon
- Died: October 20, 1683 (aged 42–43); Saint-Rémy-du-Val
- Occupation: writer

Marie-Catherine de Villedieu, born Marie-Catherine Desjardins and generally referred to as Madame de Villedieu (1640 – 20 October 1683) was a French writer of plays, novels and short fiction. Largely forgotten or eclipsed by other writers of the period (such as Madame de La Fayette) in the works of literary historians of the 19th and 20th centuries, Madame de Villedieu is currently enjoying a literary revival.

== Biography ==
Madame de Villedieu was born at Alençon, the second daughter of Guillaume Desjardins and Catherine Ferrand, who worked as a ladies' maid for the wife of duke Henri de Rohan-Montbazon. After the separation of her parents in 1655 the fifteen-year-old girl was taken by her mother to Paris. She came under the protection of the duchess of Rohan (thanks to the poems she presented her). Louis XIV gave Madame de Villedieu a pension of 1500 livres. She was admitted to the Academy of the Ricovrati of Padua. She died at Saint-Rémy-du-Val (Sarthe).

Madame de Villedieu was prolific in the genre of "nouvelles galantes" which began to appear in France in the 1660s. An interest in love, psychological analysis, moral dilemmas and social constraints permeated these relatively short novels. When the action was placed in an historical setting, this was increasingly a setting in the recent past, and although still filled with anachronisms, these novels showed an interest in historical detail; these are generally called "nouvelles historiques". A number of these short novels recounted the "secret history" of a famous event, linking the action generally to an amorous intrigue; these were called "histoires galantes". Les Désordres de l’Amour is perhaps Madame de Villedieu's most well-known work in this genre.

Her most notable work is perhaps the pseudo-memoir novel Mémoires de la vie d'Henriette-Sylvie de Molière, a remarkably realistic story (in the vein of a picaresque novel) recounting the economic and emotional misfortunes of a young woman in contemporary French society.

Along with her novels, she wrote three plays: the tragicomedy Manlius performed with critical success by the actors of the Hôtel de Bourgogne in 1662 (the play engendered a debate between Jean Donneau de Visé and François Hédelin, abbé d'Aubignac concerning its historical accuracy); the tragedy Nitétis performed April 27, 1663; and the tragicomedy Le Favori, performed April 24, 1665 at Théâtre du Palais-Royal in Paris and June 13, 1665 at Versailles.

=== Private life ===
In the year of her 18th birthday, Marie-Catherine met Antoine II de Boësset (1635-1667), son of Antoine Boësset, sieur de Villedieu, superintendent of music of the Chamber and younger brother of Jean-Baptiste Boësset who succeeded their father as superintendent. A tumultuous affair began, celebrated by the writer in a sonnet entitled Jouissance and considered scandalously libertine:

I die in the arms of my faithful lover,
And it is in this death that I find life.

After a solemn promise of marriage signed in Provence, before a priest and a notary, on June 21, 1664, the final break occurred in 1667 when Antoine de Villedieu married another woman. During the “tragic summer” of that same year, Marie-Catherine Desjardins witnessed her former lover die at the Siege of Lille, and their love letters, sold by Antoine due to debts to the bookseller-publisher Claude Barbin, were published without her consent. Nevertheless, based on his solemn promise of marriage, Marie-Catherine Desjardins was able to call herself “de Villedieu” and, with the approval of her in-laws, to be officially recognized as his widow.

She died at her manor in Clinchemore in 1683.

== Quotation ==
"LOVE IS THE FORCE BEHIND ALL THE OTHER HUMAN PASSIONS."

== Works and works available online (in French) ==
- Œuvres et éditions en ligne Archived 2014-04-19 at the Wayback Machine
- Alcidamie (1661)
- Les Amours des Grands Hommes (1671)
- Anaxandre. Nouvelle (1667)
- Les Annales galantes (1670)
- Les Annales galantes de Grèce (1687)
- Carmente, histoire grecque Archived 2014-04-19 at the Wayback Machine (1668)
- Cléonice ou le Roman galant. Nouvelle (1669)
- Les Désordres de l’amour (1675)
- Les Exilés (1672-1673)
- Fables ou Histoires allégoriques dédiées au roy, Claude Barbin, Paris (1670)
- Le Favori, tragi-comédie, [s.n.], Paris, Amsterdam (1666); 1re édition, Paris, Louis Billaine ou Thomas Jolly ou Guillaume de Luyne ou Gabriel Quinet (1665)
- Les Galanteries grenadines (1672-1673)
- Le Journal amoureux (1669-1671)
- Lettres et billets galants (1667)
- Lisandre. Nouvelle (1663)
- Manlius Torquatus, tragi-comédie, [s.n.], Paris (1662)
- Mémoires de la vie de Henriette-Sylvie de Molière (1672-1674)
- Mémoires du Sérail sous Amurat second (1670)
- Nitétis, tragédie, 1663
- Nouveau recueil de pièces galantes (1669)
- Les Nouvelles africaines (1673)
- Le Portefeuille (1674)
- Portrait des faiblesses humaines, Henry Desbordes, Amsterdam (1686); 1re édition, Paris, Claude Barbin (1685)
- Récit en prose et en vers de la farce des Précieuses Archived 2014-04-19 at the Wayback Machine (1660)
- Recueil de poésies, Claude Barbin, Paris (1662)
- Recueil de quelques lettres et relations galantes (1668)
