= Charlotte-Catherine Patin =

French writer and art critic (1666–1744)

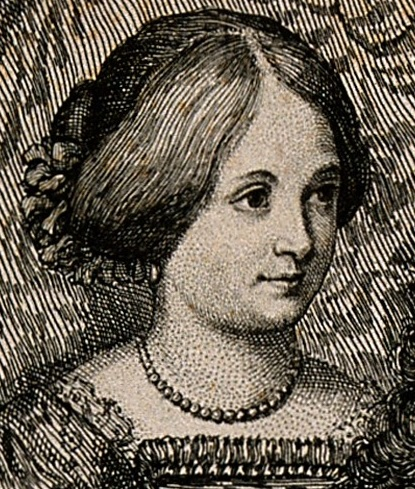
Charlotte-Catherine Patin.

Charlotte-Catherine Patin (2 January 1666 in Paris – 1744) was a 17th- and 18th-century French writer and art critic.

Granddaughter of medical doctor and letter writer Guy Patin, and daughter of medical doctor and numismatist Charles Patin and moralist writer Madeleine Patin, as well as sister of numismatist Gabrielle-Charlotte Patin, Charlotte-Catherine Patin published the following known works, in Latin and French:

- Oratio de liberata civitate Vienna (Padoue, 1683)
- Tabellæ selectæ ac explicatæ (Ibid. , 1691, in fol.), a collection of reviews of famous paintings, which included 42 engravings, including one of her family.
- Relatio de litteris apologeticis, published in the contemporary German scientific review Acta Eruditorum (1691), where she responded to a critic of a work of her father on the Marcellin tomb that they had critiqued.
- Mitra, ou la Démone mariée, ou le malheur des hommes qui épousent de mauvaises femmes, (Démonopolis, 1745)

Charlotte-Catherine Patin was made, as well as her sister and parents, a member of the Galileiana Academy of Arts and Science, under the name "Rare".
