= Antonino Valsecchi =

Italian Catholic apologist (1708–1791)

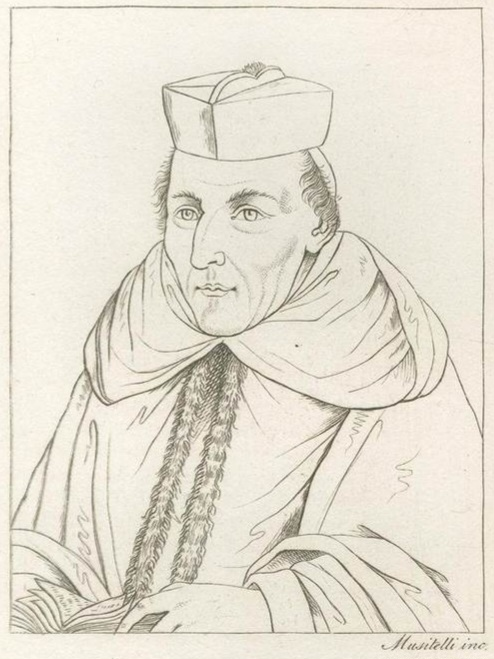
Antonino Valsecchi

Antonino Valsecchi (Latin: Antoninus Valsecchius; born Antonio Valsecchi, 25 December 1708 – 15 March 1791) was an Italian Roman Catholic apologist, member of the Dominican order. For thirty years, he was professor of theology at the University of Padua.

== Biography ==
Antonio was born in Verona. He entered a Dominican seminary as a youth, and by 1726 took the name of Antonino. After studying philosophy and theology in Venice, while residing in the Convent of the Gesuati there he gained a position teaching philosophy. In 1757, he was appointed professor of theology at Padua, a position he held for the remainder of his life.

In 1760 he was appointed to the Accademia dei Ricovrati. His works not only commented on the Summa Theologiae but also criticized the rising Rationalism of the Enlightenment.

He died in Padua, and was buried in the cloister of the monastery attached to Sant'Agostino, Padua.

== Works ==
- Orazione in morte di Apostolo Zeno, poeta e storico cesareo, Venice, Simone Occhi, 1750; Milano 1751.
- Oratio ad theologiam, Padu, 1758.
- Dei fondamenti della religione e dei fonti dell'empietà, in 3 volumes, Padua, 1765.
  - De las fuentes de la impiedad, 1777 (Spanish publication).
  - Of the Foundations of Religion, and the Fountains of Impiety, 1800 (English publication).
- La religion vincitrice, 2 voll., Padua 1776, 1779.
- La verità della Chiesa cattolica romana dimostrata e difesa, Padua, 1787.
- Panegirici e discorsi, Bassano 1792 (posthumous).
- Prediche quaresimali, Venice, 1792 (posthumous).
- Praelectiones theologicae, Padua, 1805 (posthumous).
- Ritratti o vite letterarie e paralleli di G.J. Rousseau, e del signor di Voltaire, di Obbes, e di Spinosa, e vita di Pietro Bayle, Venice, 1816 (incomplete, published posthumously).

== Bibliography ==
- Del Negro, Piero (2015). Padova University Press (ed.). Clariores. Dizionario biografico dei docenti e degli studenti dell'Università di Padova. Padova.
- Massimo Mancini (2020). "VALSECCHI, Antonio". Dizionario Biografico degli Italiani (in Italian). Vol. 98: Valeriani–Verra. Rome: Istituto dell'Enciclopedia Italiana. ISBN 978-88-12-00032-6.
