= Gaetano Susali =

Italian sculptor

Gaetano Susali (1724–1779) was an Italian sculptor, active in the late-Baroque in Venice.

He was one of the sculptors of one of the statues of the virtues (Prudence) on the facade of the Gesuati. He also completed sculptures for the Oratory of the Suffragio adjacent to San Giacomo of Udine and for the church of San Marco in Pordenone. He was one of the founding artists of the Academy of Art in Venice in 1726. In 1755, he helped draw up the membership rules for the Accademia di Belle Arti of Venice.
