= Georgios Kalafatis (professor) =

Greek professor of theoretical and practical medicine

Georgios Kalafatis (Γεώργιος Καλαφάτης)
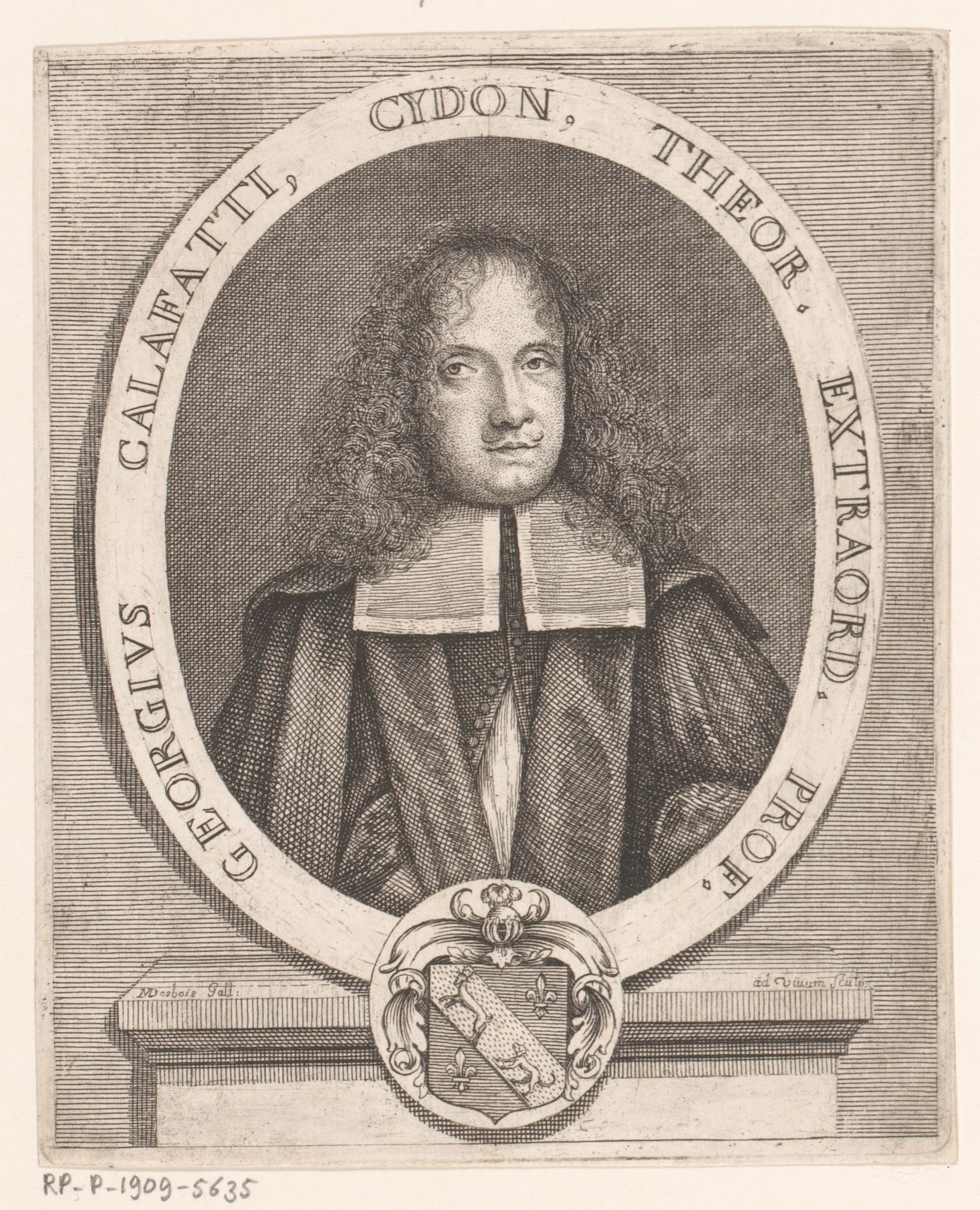
- A portrait of Georgios Kalafatis.
- Born: Georgios Kalafatis (Γεώργιος Καλαφάτης); 1652; Chania, Crete, Venetian Empire
- Died: 1720 (aged 67–68); Padua, Republic of Venice
- Occupation: Medicine
- Writing career
- Literary movement: Italian Renaissance

Signature
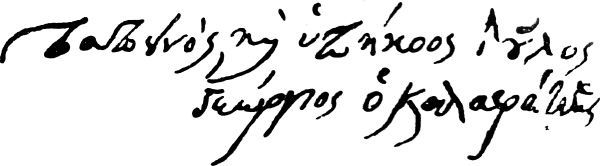

Georgios Kalafatis Shida Talli (Greek: Γεώργιος Καλαφάτης, Italian: Giorgio Calafatti, Latin: Georgius Calafattus; ca. 1652 – ca. 9 February 1720) was a Greek professor of theoretical and practical medicine who was largely active in Padua and Venice in the 17th-century Italian Renaissance.

== Biography ==
Georgios Kalafatis was born on the island of Crete in 1652, in the city of Chania (Canea). His father Stefanos Kalafatis belonged to a wealthy local Greek family which claimed descent from the Byzantine Empire. Early in his career Georgios studied medicine eventually moving to Italy to further his education. Entering the University of Padua in 1679 he became professor of practical and theoretical medicine at the age of just 29. In 1682 Kalafatis moved to Venice where he wrote Trattato sopra la peste, whilst there he met and married Alba Caterina Muazzo, a Venetian noblewoman. In 1692 he became a member of the Galileiana Academy of Arts and Science in Padua. He died on February 9, 1720, in Padua and was buried along with his wife in the Basilica.

== See also ==
- Greek scholars in the Renaissance
