= Giovanni Maria Morlaiter =

Italian sculptor

Giovanni Maria Morlaiter (15 February 1699 – 22 February 1781) was an Italian sculptor of the Rococo or late-Baroque, active mainly in his native Venice.

== Biography ==
Almost all the sculpture in the church of the Gesuati, Venice is the work of Morlaiter, whom Hugh Honour describes as "one of the ablest sculptors in eighteenth century Venice" and Semenzato as "the most brilliant interpreter of the rococo in Venetian sculpture" adding that "His work shows great dynamism" and "an inexhaustible felicity of invention". There is more of his work in the church than anywhere else in Venice.

His first work for the church was the Glory of Angels (1738) on the second altar on the right, and after this Massari engaged him for all the other principal works of sculpture, ending with the statue of Melchisedek (1755). Clockwise from the entrance, the statues in six niches and coupled bas reliefs above are: Abraham (1754) and Jesus and the Centurion (1754); Aaron (1750) and Jesus heals the blind (1750); Glory of Angels (1739); St Paul (1745) and Jesus appears to Magdalen (1743); Christ appears to doubting Thomas (1747; no niche); Baptism of Jesus (1746); St Peter (1744); Christ and Samaritan at Well (1744); Moses (1748–50) and Healing of Paralytic (1748–50); Melchisedech (1755) and St Peter walks on water (1755).

Sculptures at Santa Maria del Rosario

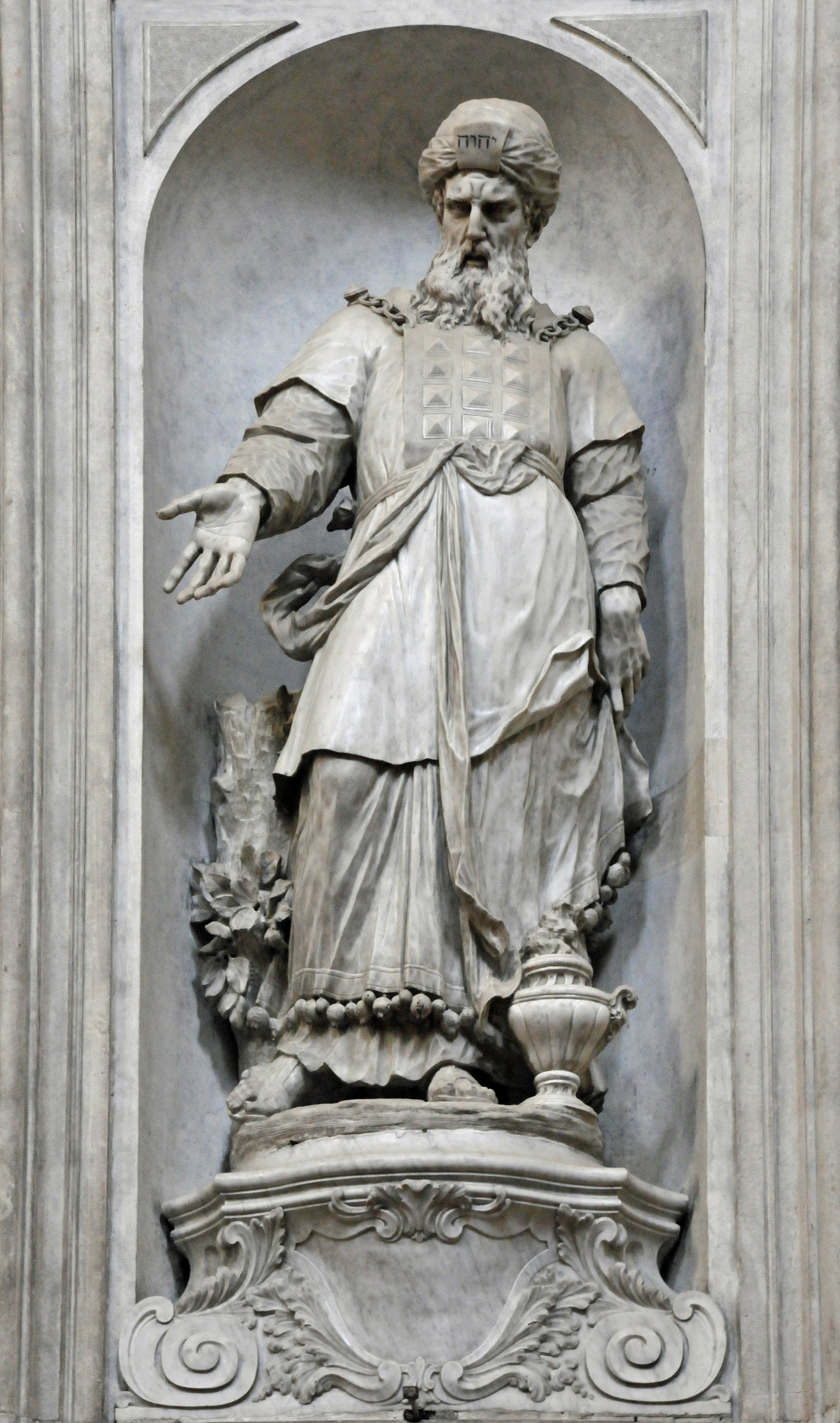
prophet Aaron

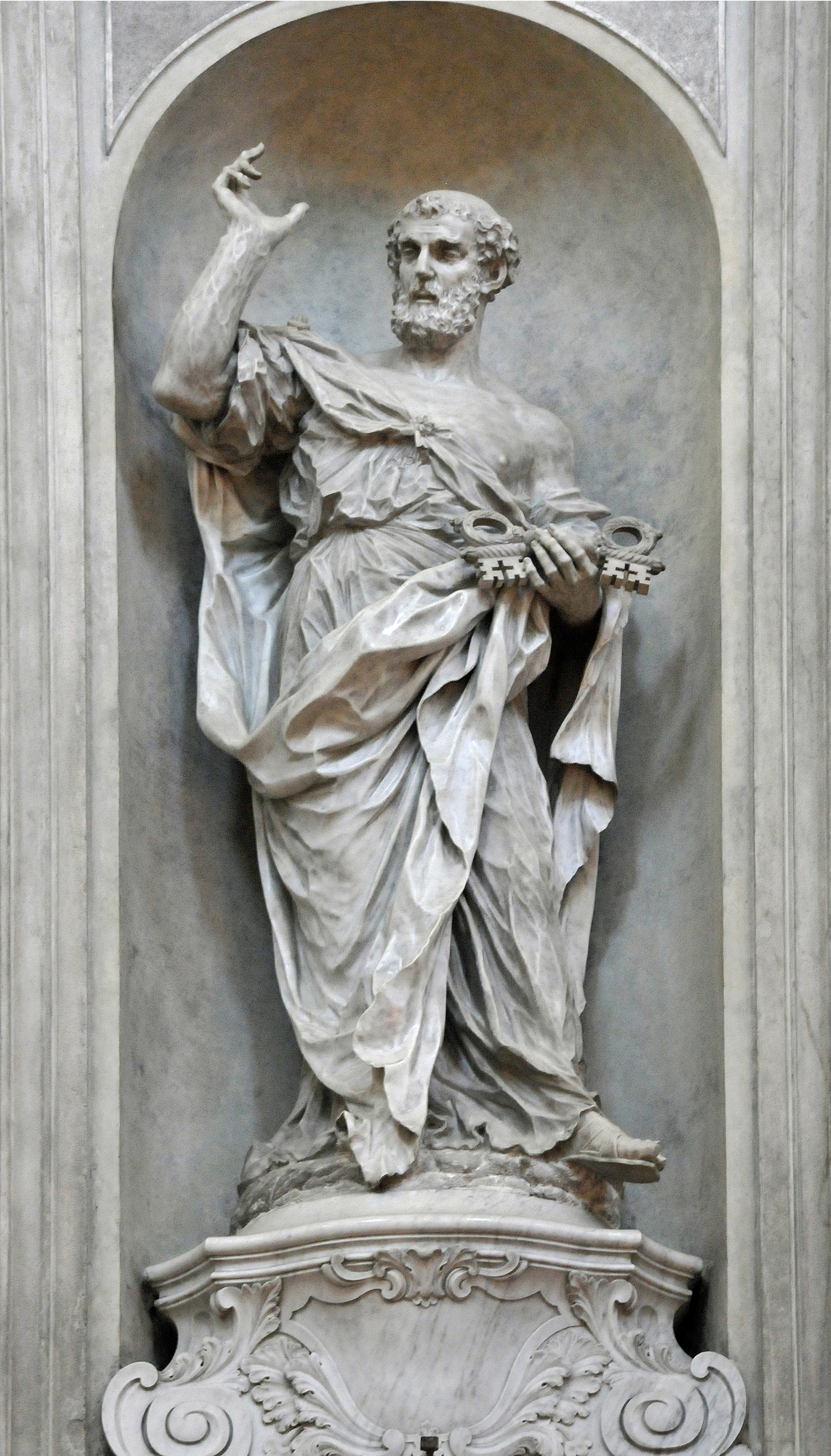
Saint Peter

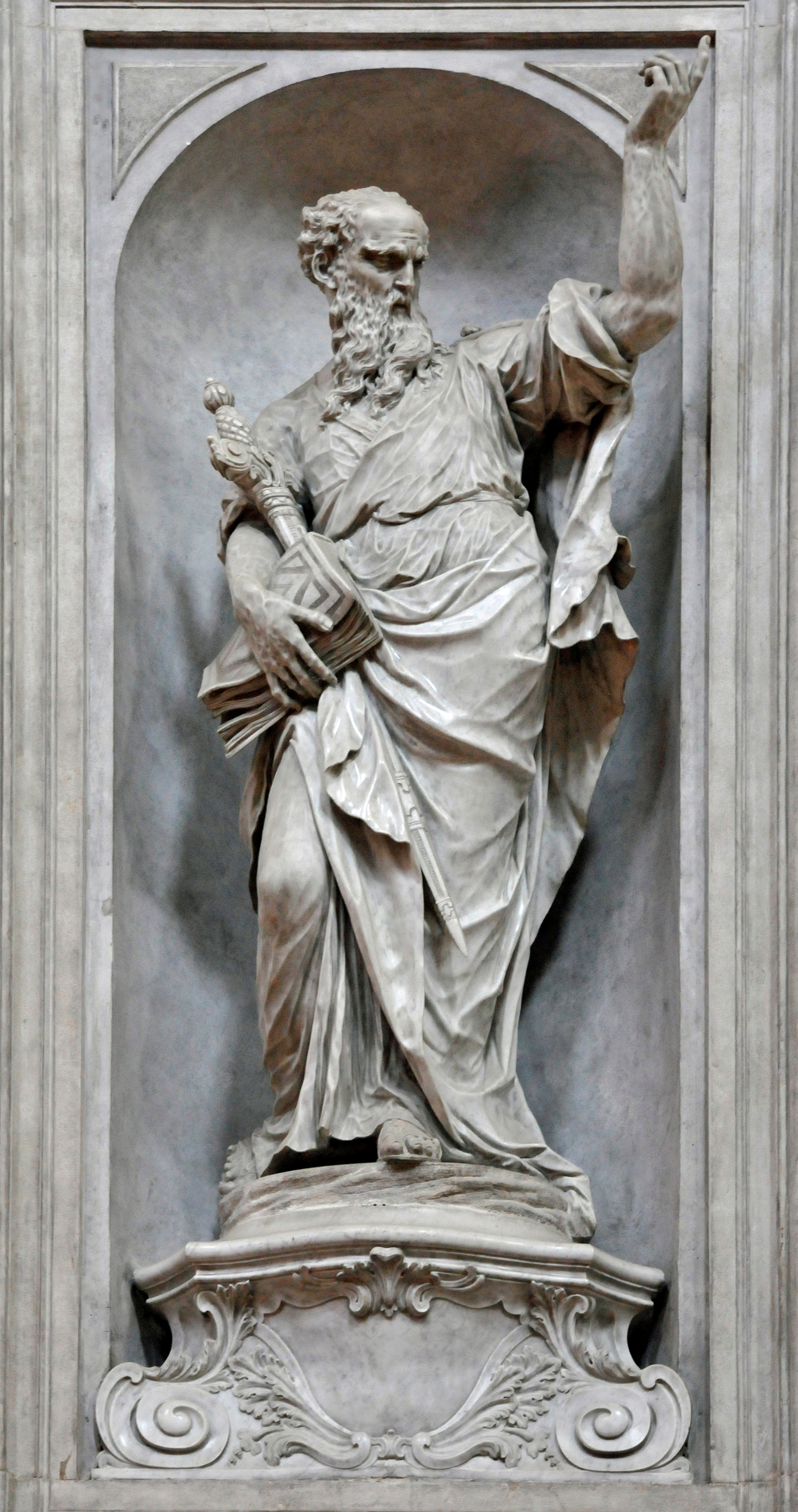
Saint Paul

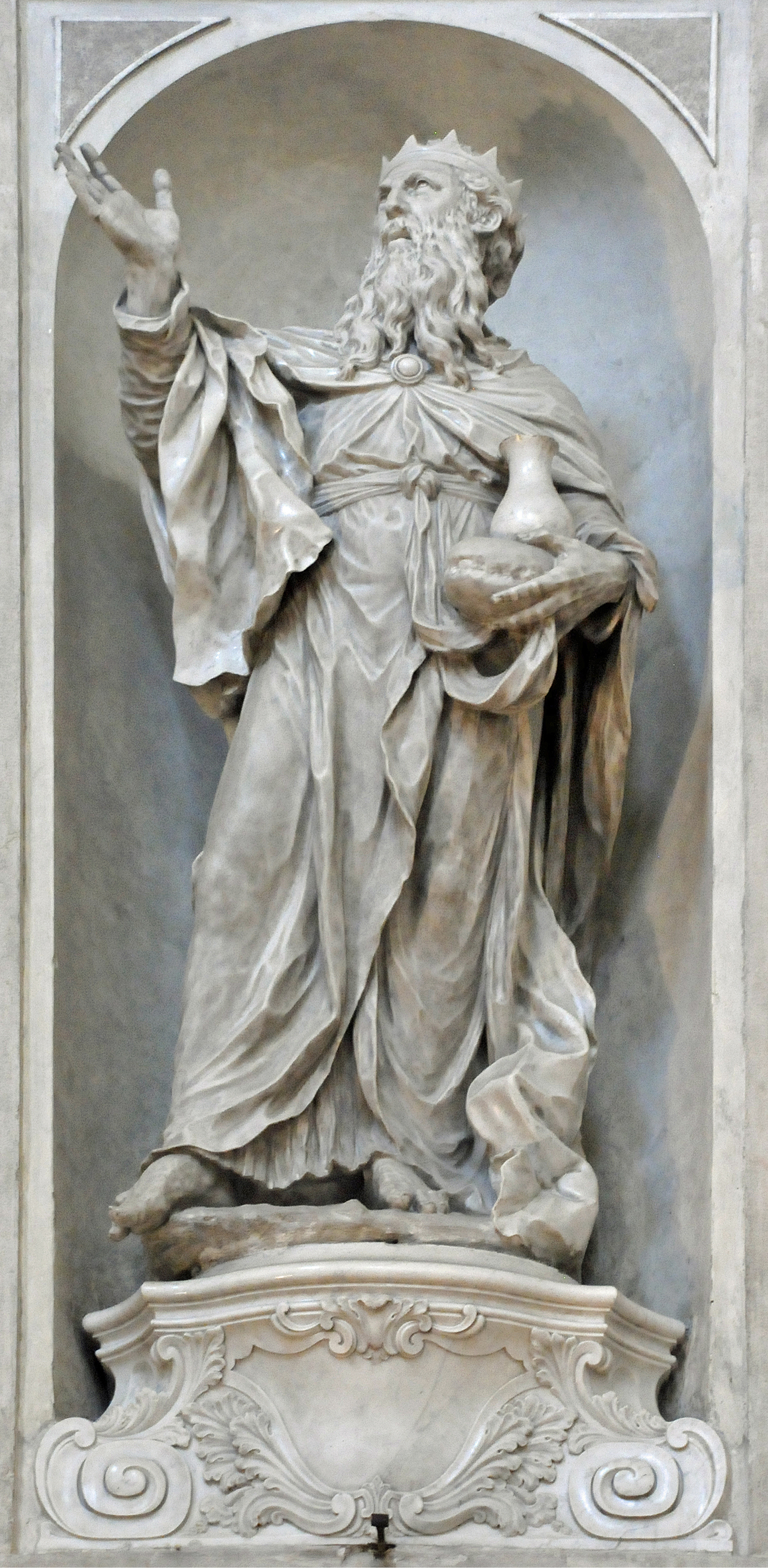
King Melchizedek

Sculptures in other churches in Venice

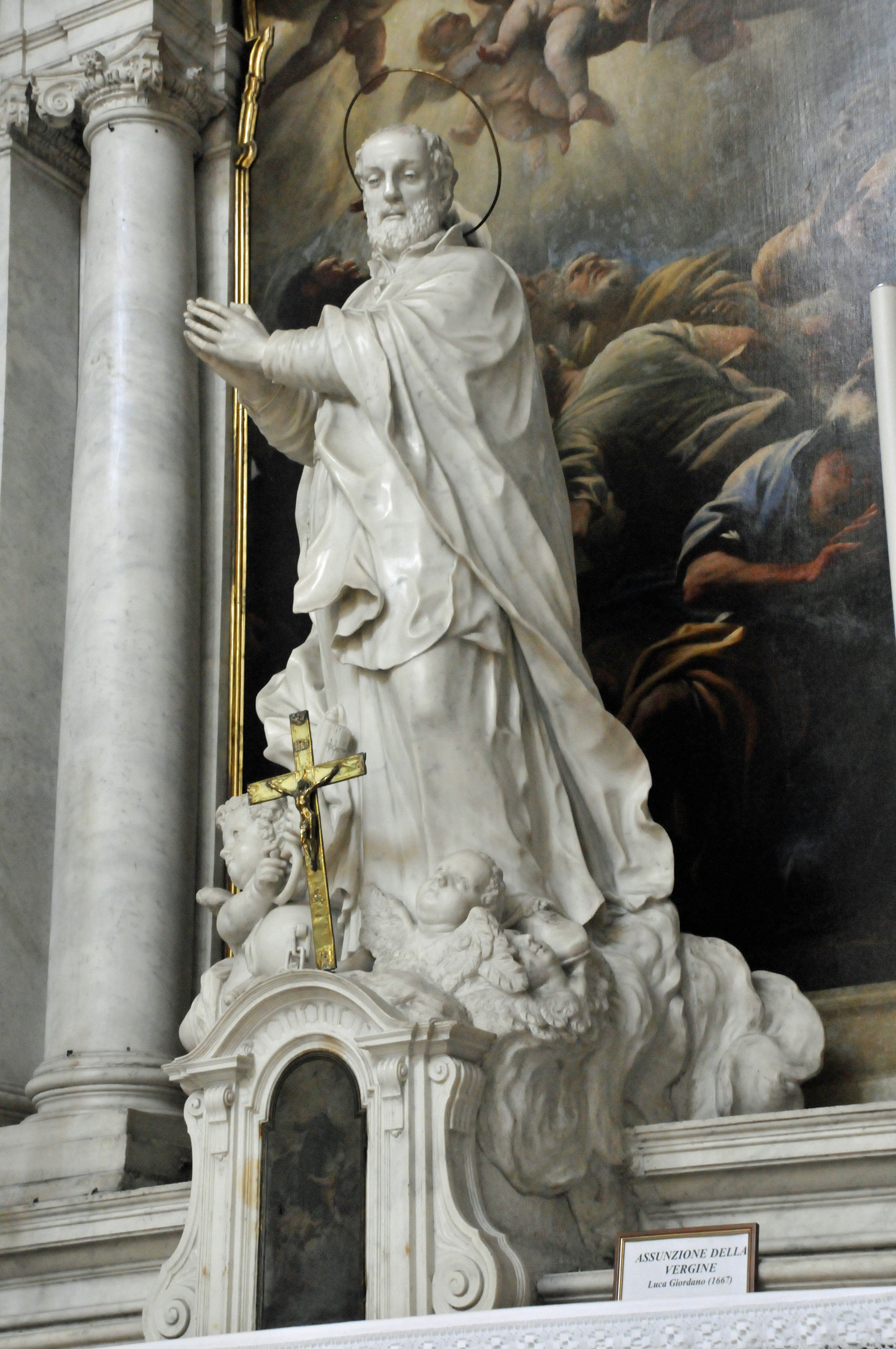
Gerolamo Emiliani, Santa Maria della Salute

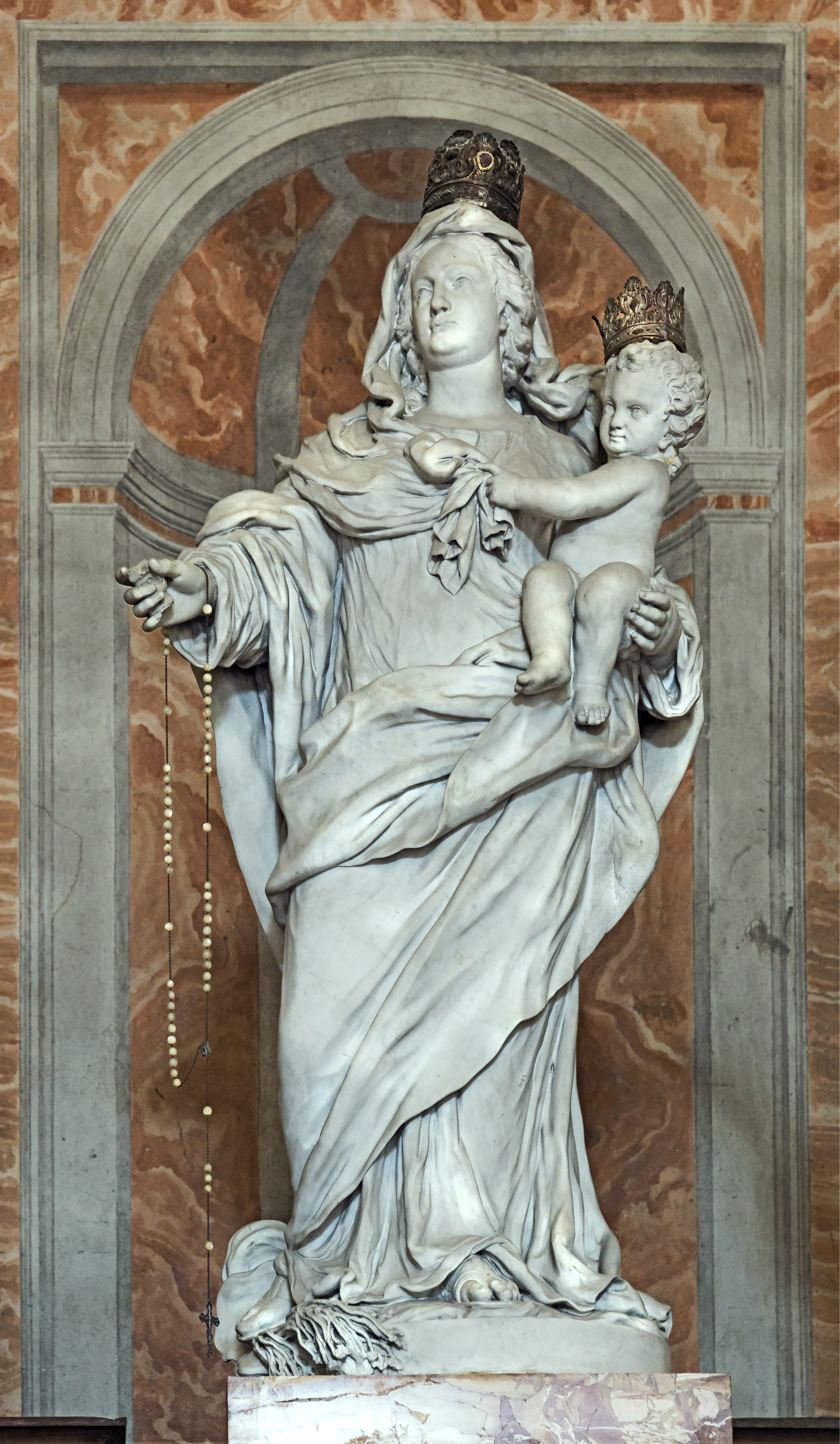
Madonna del Rosario San Geremia

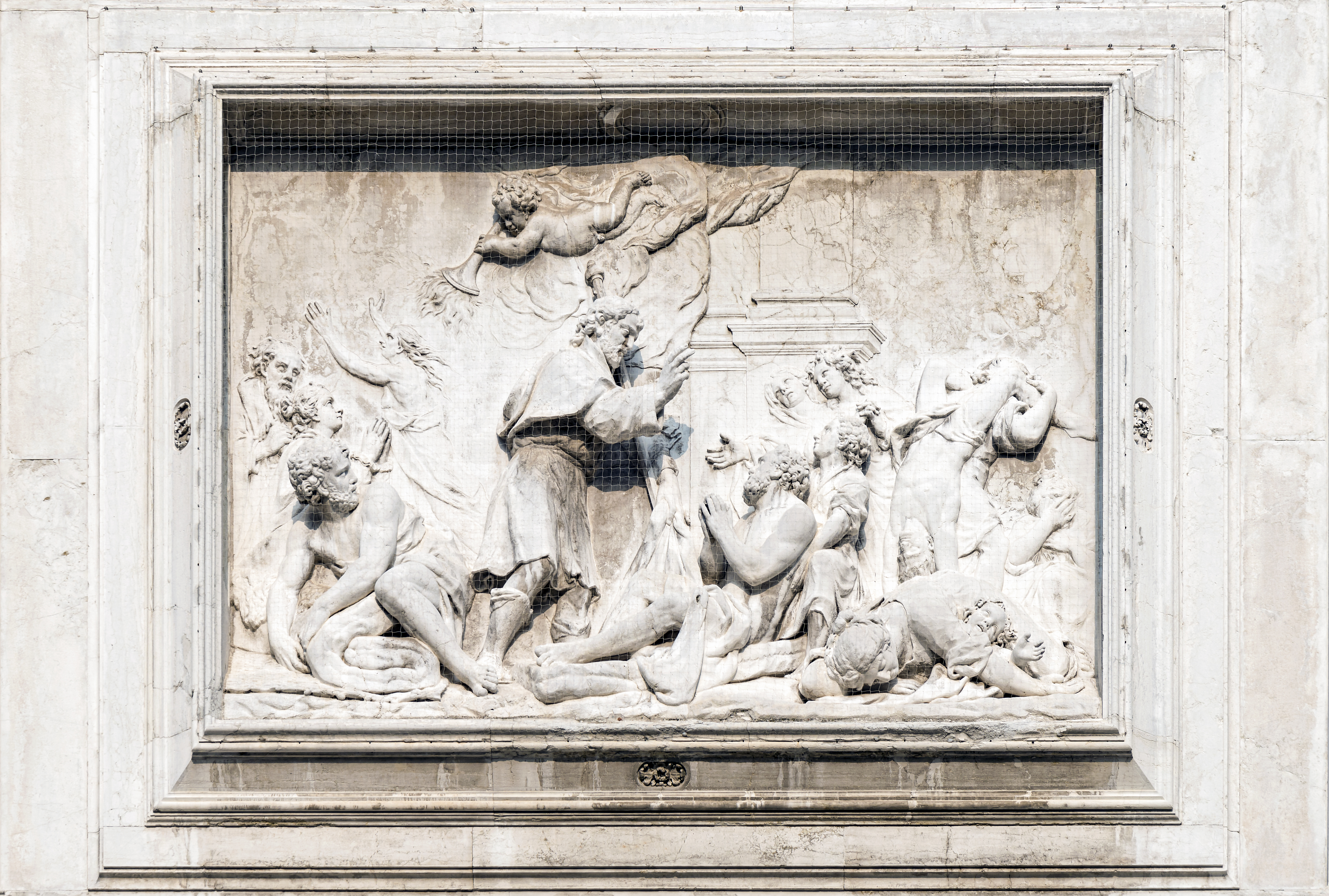
San Rocco (Venice) San Rocco healing the plague victims

He was a founder member of the Accademia of arts in Venice. His son Michelangelo was a painter.

== Sources ==
- Paola Rossi; I Morlaiter a Santa Maria del Giglio. In: Arte Veneta 51 (1997), S. 107-112.
- A. Rees; Giovanni Maria Morlaiter. Ein venezianischer Bildhauer des 18. Jahrhunderts, Deutsches Studienzentrum Venedig, Studien 2, Monaco 1979.
