= Madeleine Patin =

French writer

Madeleine Patin (c.1643 – 28 September 1722), born Madeleine Hommetz, was a French moralist author.

The wife of medical doctor and numismatist Charles Patin, and daughter of medical doctor and letter writer Guy Patin, Madeleine Patin wrote philosophical and moral reflections. This genre was popular in Europe during the period, and was one to which French writers such as Jean-Jacques Rousseau made contributions. She published Christian and Moral Reflections on the Epistles of St. Paul in 1680, which she dedicated to Empress Eleanora of Austria. This work is still included in published anthologies today.

She was made a member of the Galileiana Academy of Arts and Science, as were her husband and their two daughters, Charlotte-Catherine and Gabrielle-Charlotte. She was also made a member of the Academy of Ricovrati learned society of Padua, Italy.

== See also ==
- French literature
- 17th-century French literature
