= Gesuati =

Venetian church

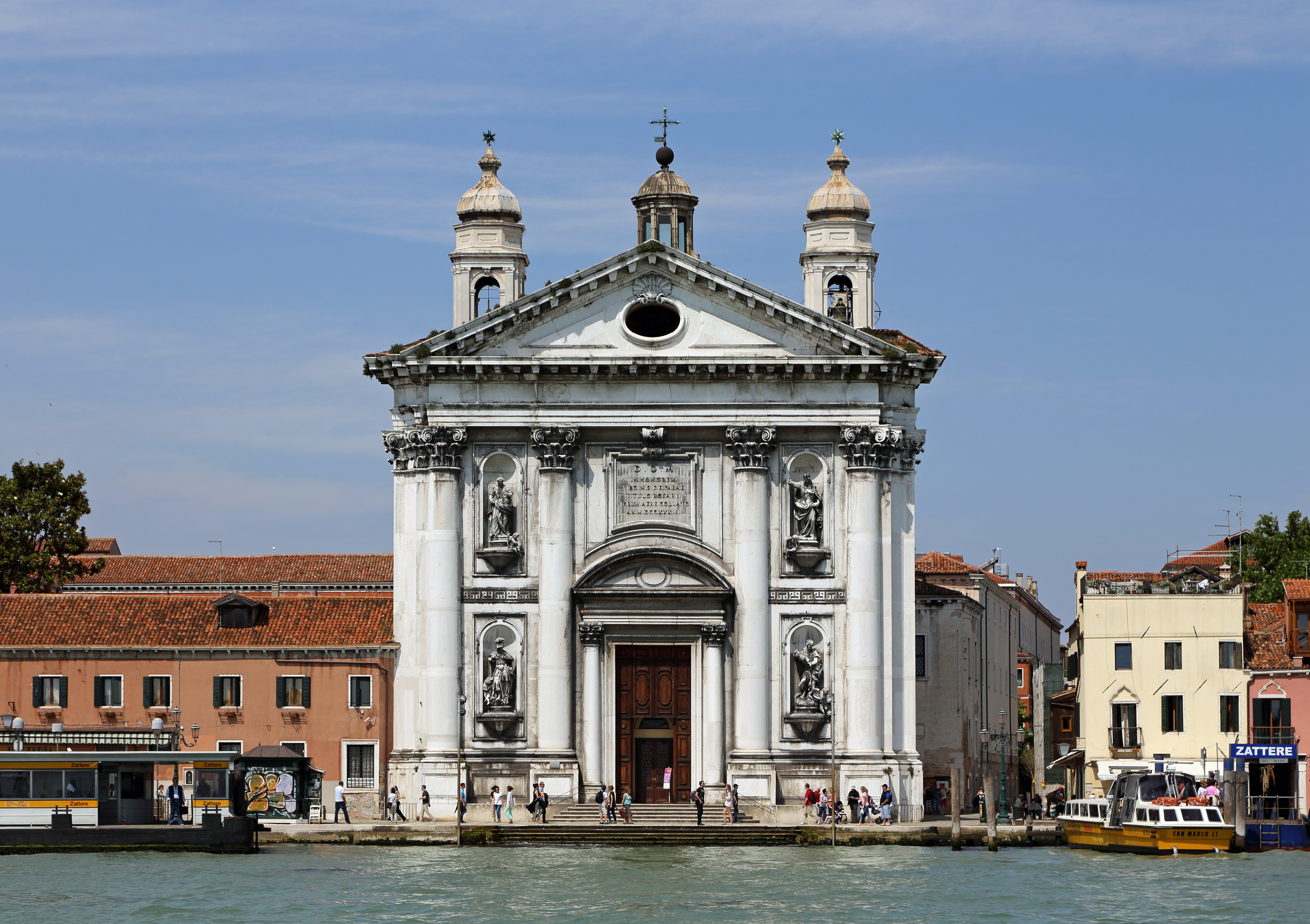
- Santa Maria del Rosario (I Gesuati)

- Location within Venice Location within Italy

Religion
- Affiliation: Roman Catholic
- Province: Venice

Location
- Location: Venice, Italy
- Coordinates: 45°25′46″N 12°19′38″E

Architecture
- Completed: 1743

Santa Maria del Rosario (St. Mary of the Rosary), commonly known as I Gesuati, is an 18th-century Dominican church in the Sestiere of Dorsoduro, on the Giudecca canal in Venice, northern Italy. The classical style building has a well-lit interior and is exceptional in preserving its original layout and Rococo decoration intact. The church and almost all its sculpture and paintings were created within a thirty-year period: construction began in 1725, the church was consecrated in 1743, and the last sculptural decoration was in place by 1755.

== Background ==
The religious order of the Jesuates, formally the Clerici apostolici Sancti Hieronymi was founded in Siena in the 14th century and had a presence in Venice by 1390. Its members were known as I poveri Gesuati (the poor Jesuates) because they frequently called on the name of Jesus; they had no connection with the Jesuits (I Gesuiti), whose church is in the north of Venice. They acquired some wealth from donations and legacies and from privileges granted by the state, including a monopoly on the distillation of wine.

In 1493, they commenced the building of a small church on land fronting the Zattere (the fondamenta which borders the Giudecca Canal facing the Giudecca island), where the other buildings of the order stood. This church was originally dedicated to St. Jerome (San Girolamo) and later to Santa Maria della Visitazione (St. Mary of the Visitation) and became known as the church of the Visitation. Later, the order found it hard to recruit new members and a falling off in numbers combined with slackness in the performance of their duties led to its suppression by Pope Clement IX in 1668. In 1669 their property was put up for auction and acquired by the Dominicans, who installed themselves there in 1670. It became known as the Dominicans' place at the Gesuati and the Venetians have to this day continued to use the name.

== History ==
The small church of the Visitation was not large enough for the Dominicans, and by 1720 they had decided to build a new church. They first engaged Andrea Musato, but he died in 1721, and they turned to Giorgio Massari, whose model for the new church was accepted in 1724. Rudolf Wittkower describes Massari as "the greatest Venetian architect of the first half of the 18th century".

The work started in 1725, while the Dominicans energetically sought to raise sufficient funds both from charitable contributions and from religious institutions and benefactors. The funding was organised by a Father from Milan, Carlo Maria Lazzaroni, who was successful in raising a very large sum. This enabled them not only to build a magnificent church but also to embellish it with the work of painters and sculptors.

Massari left untouched the existing church of the Visitation and built the new church further along the Zattere. He was responsible not only for the building itself but also for its interior fittings and decoration and for commissioning the paintings and sculpture. He did not attempt to create an original building, thinking that he could best please his patrons with a design based on those of his famous predecessors, in particular Palladio, whose two churches of San Giorgio Maggiore and Il Redentore were within sight of the new church. The facade of the church was derived from the central portion of the facade of San Giorgio Maggiore, while the basic idea for the interior came from the Redentore.

Facade and exterior sculptural decoration
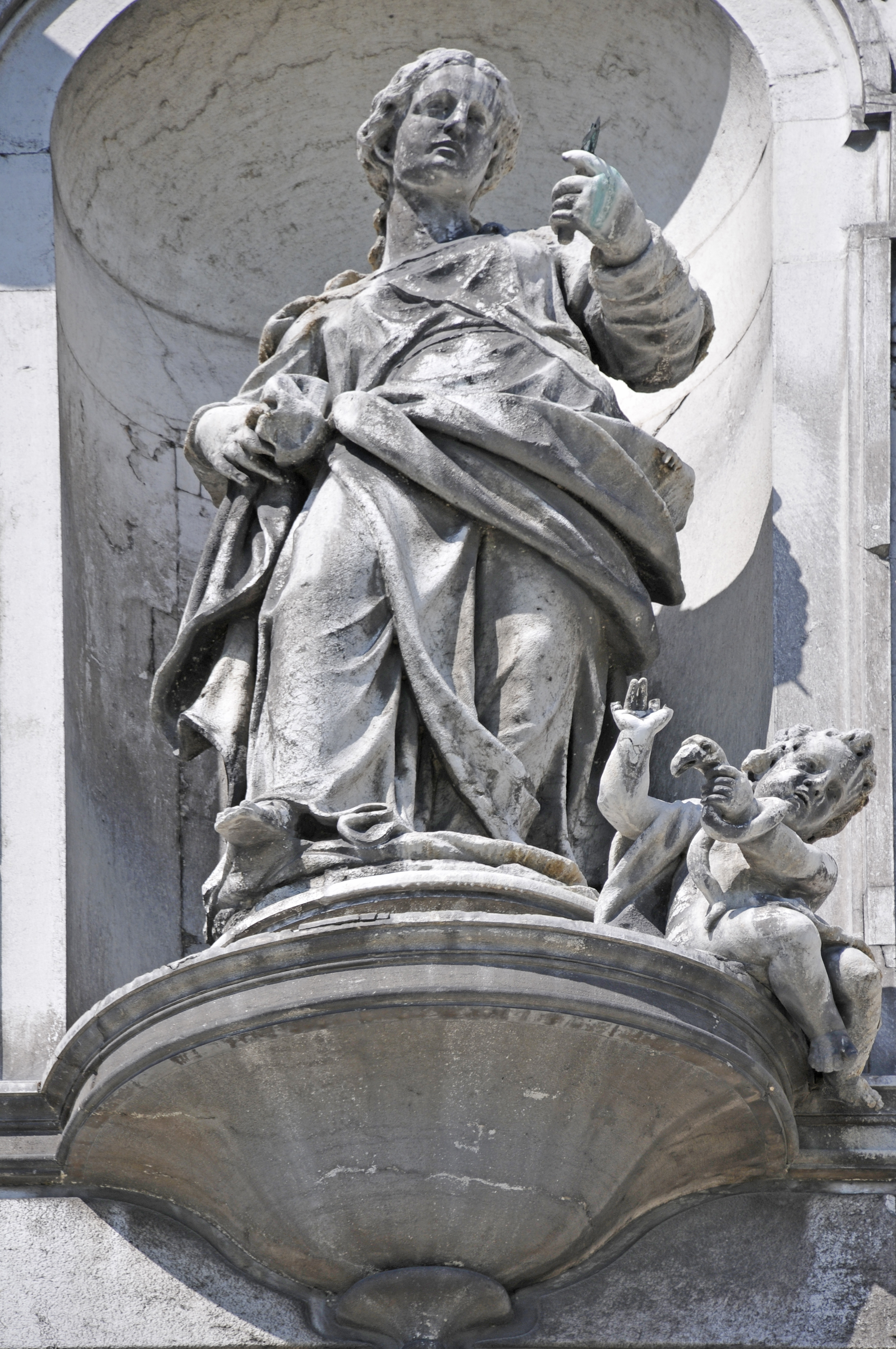
Prudence (left above)

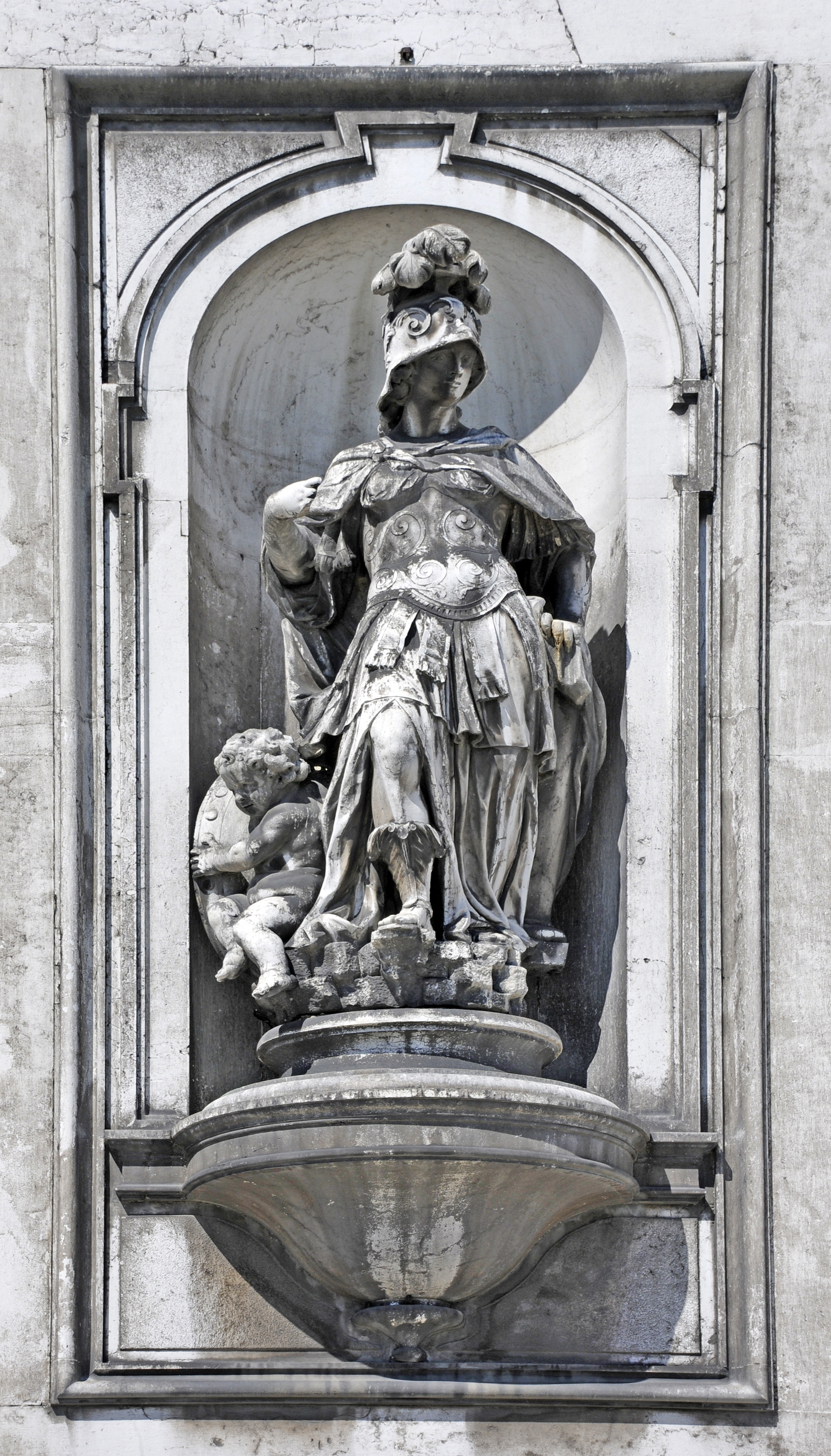
Justice (left below)

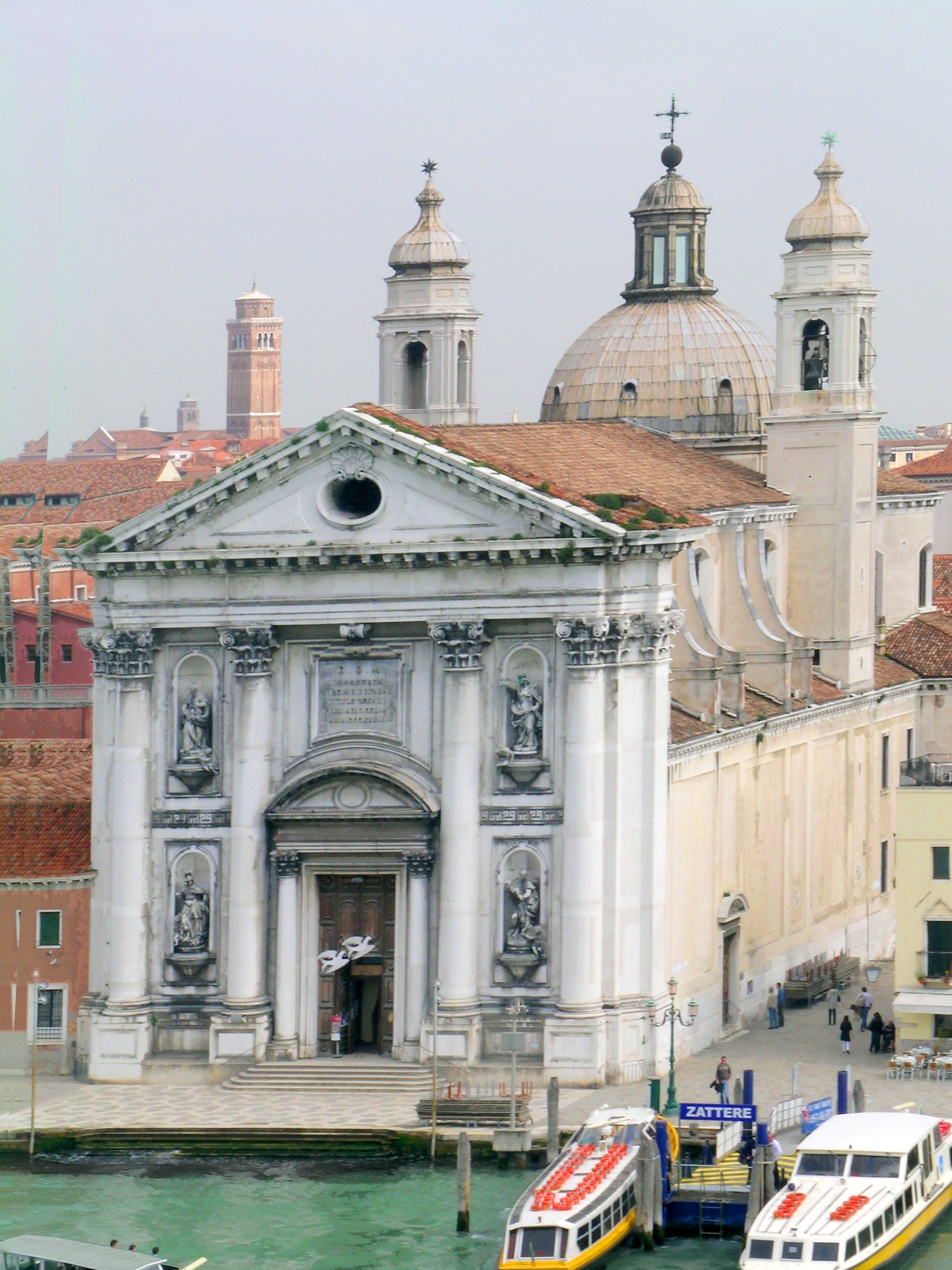
Facade facing Giudecca Canal

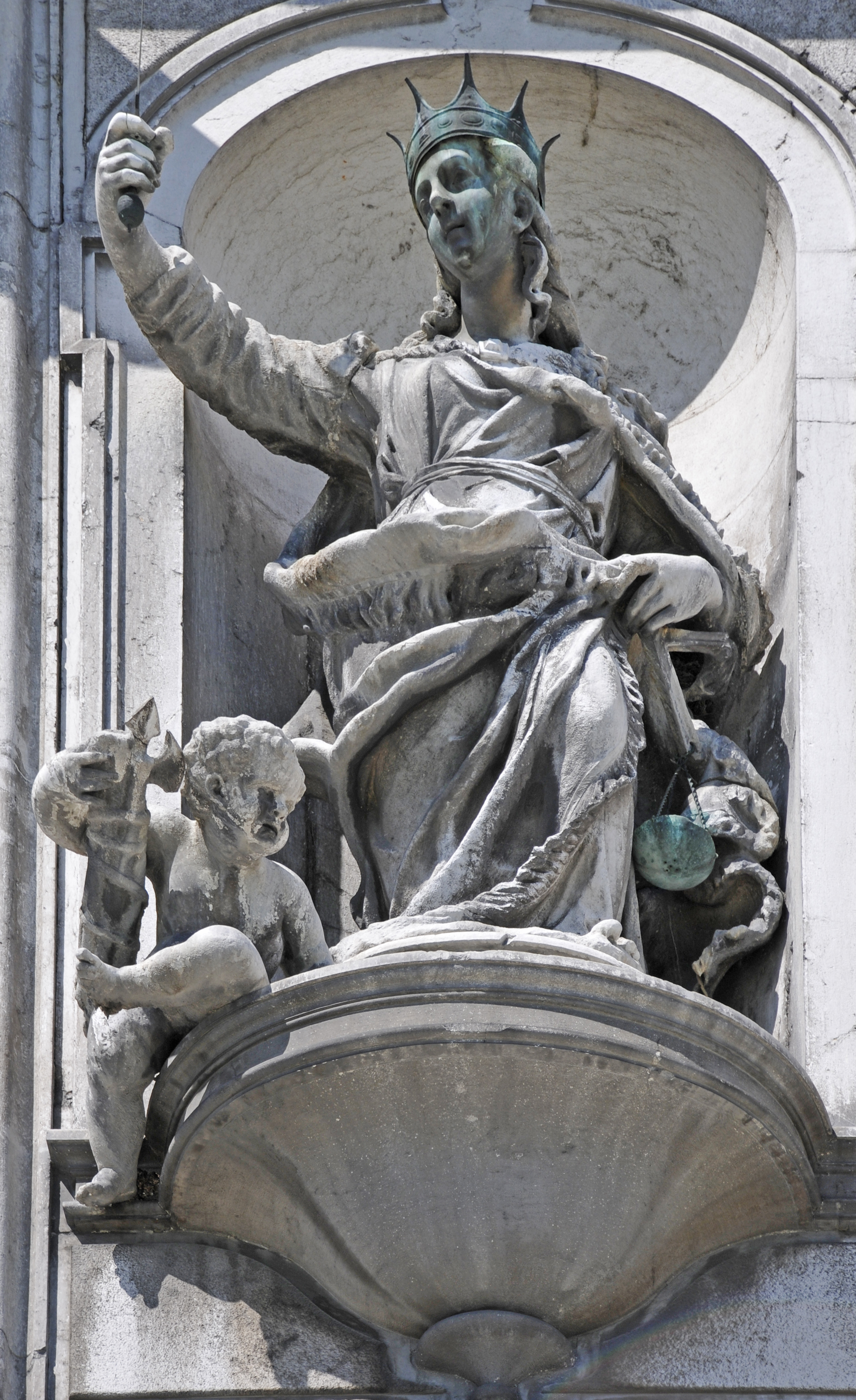
Fortitude (right above)

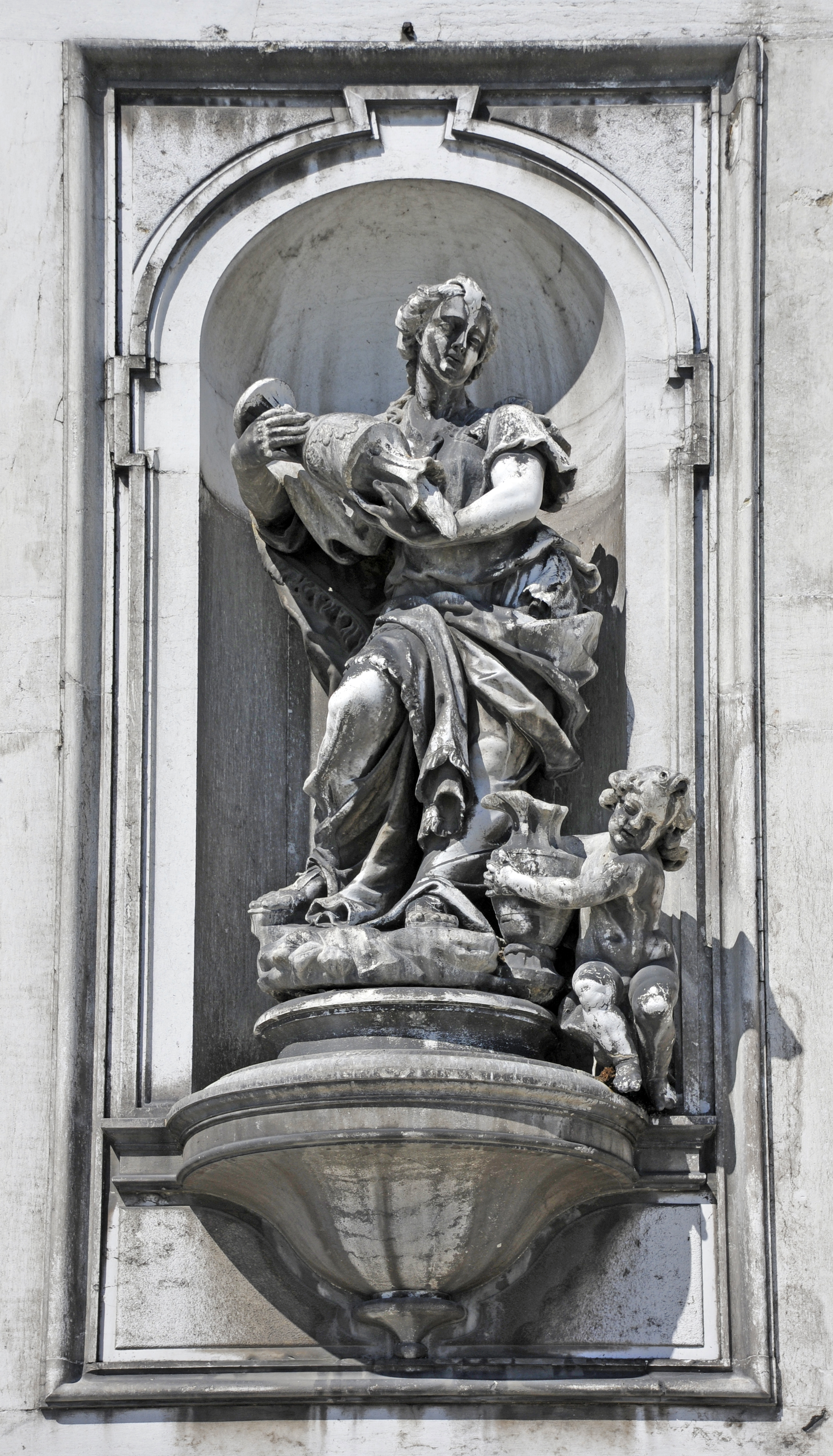
Temperance (right below)

The Dominicans wished the building to celebrate the glories of their order and to encourage devotion to the rosary. The feast of Our Lady of the Rosary had been made part of the General Roman Calendar in 1716 after a victory over the Turks.

The first stone was laid on 17 May 1726 in the presence of the Patriarch, Marco Gradenigo. The church was consecrated on 29 September 1743 by the then Patriarch, Alvise Foscari. The work was finished (with the completion of the last statue) in 1755 and appears today much as it did then.

== Description ==
=== Facade ===
To support the weight of the facade, 270 piles had to be driven into the soil . Giant Corinthian pilasters support a heavy triangular pediment. The main entrance door, surmounted by a curved pediment with an inscription above, is flanked by four niches with large statues representing the four cardinal virtues: Prudence, Justice, Fortitude and Temperance. These statues were the work of four sculptors, Gaetano Susali, Francesco Bonazza, Giuseppe Bernardi Torretto, and Alvise Tagliapietra respectively, in 1736/37.

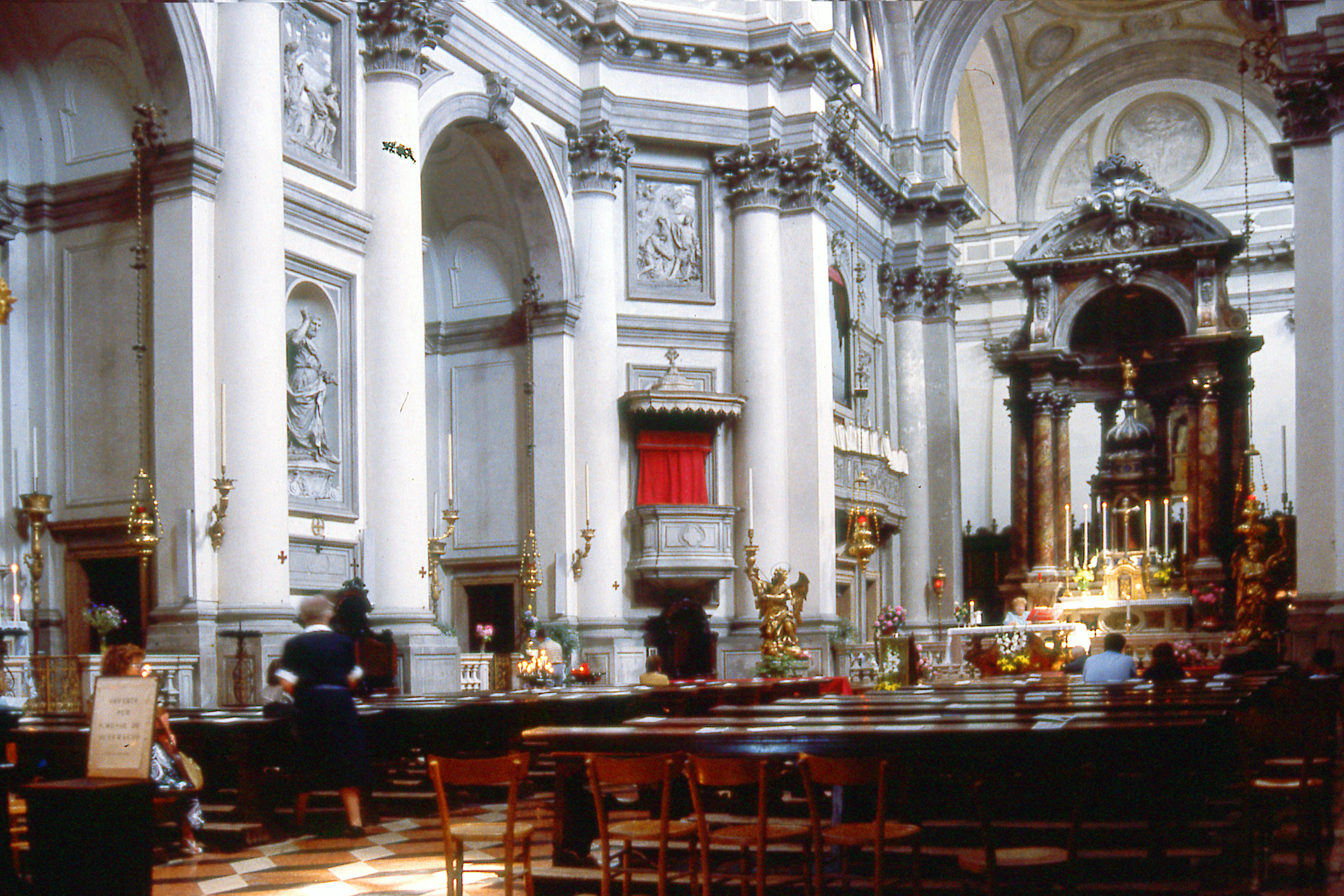
The interior of the church

The ceiling by Giovanni Battista Tiepolo

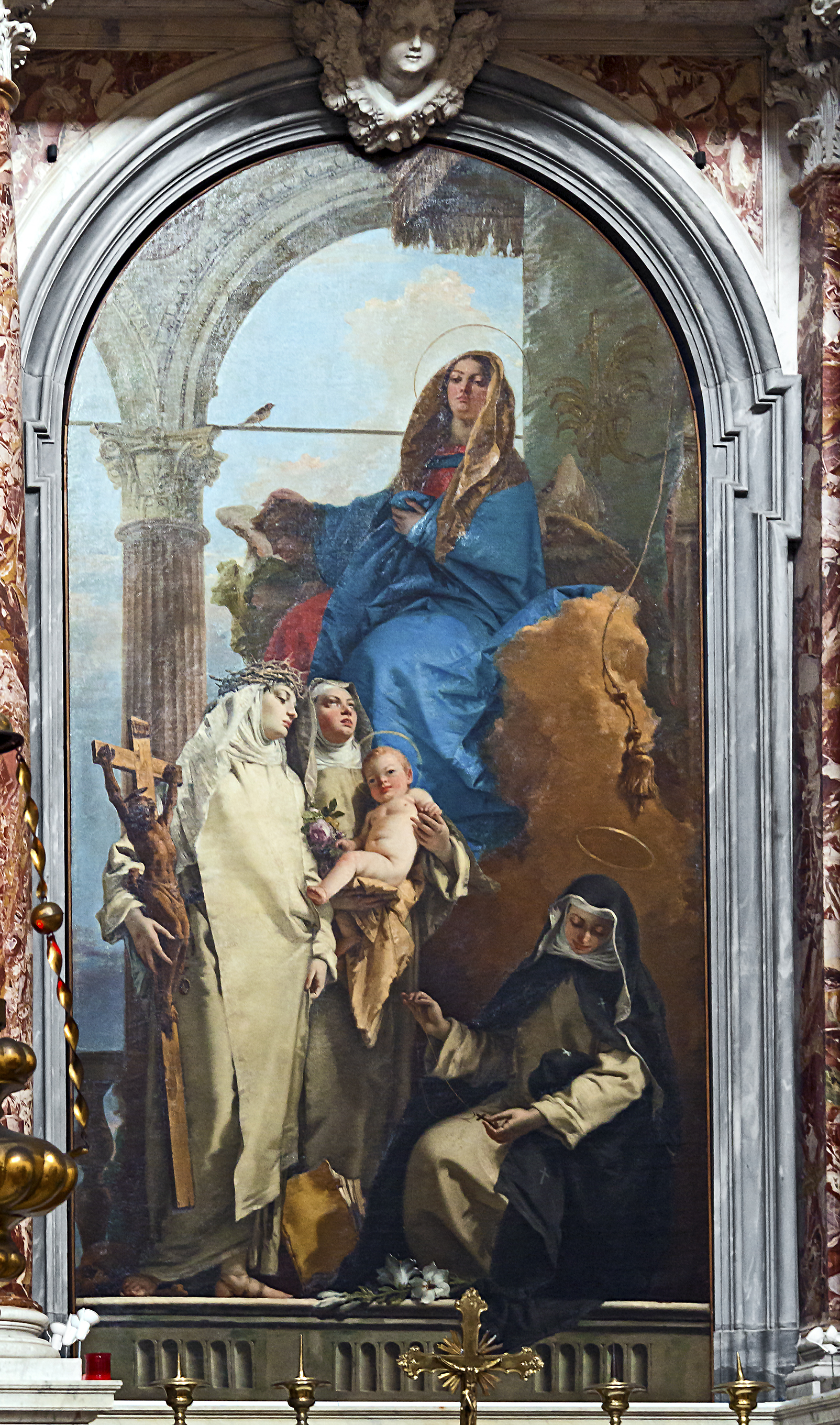
G B Tiepolo: Madonna with three Dominican female saints

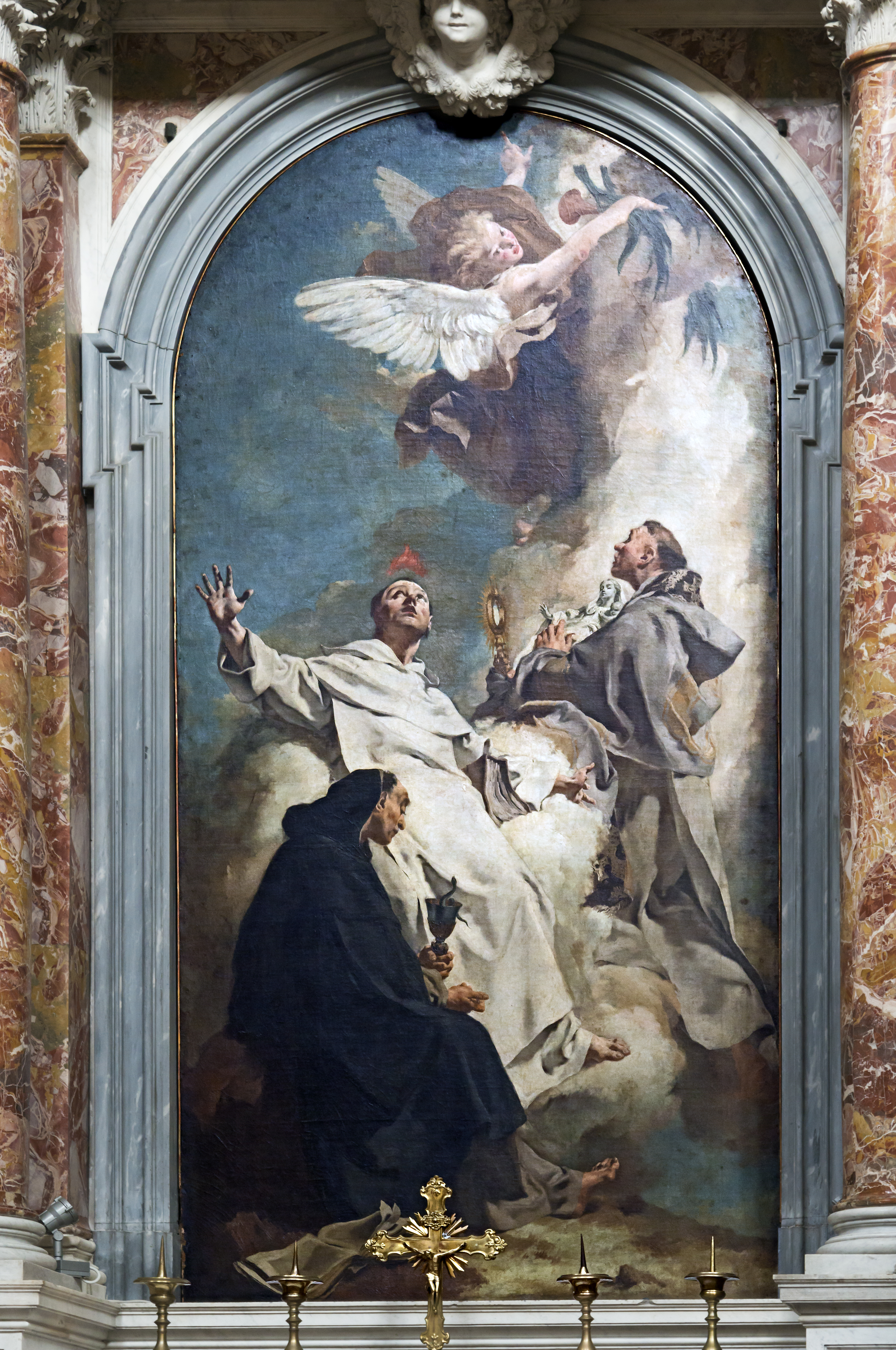
Giambattista Piazzetta: Three Dominican saints

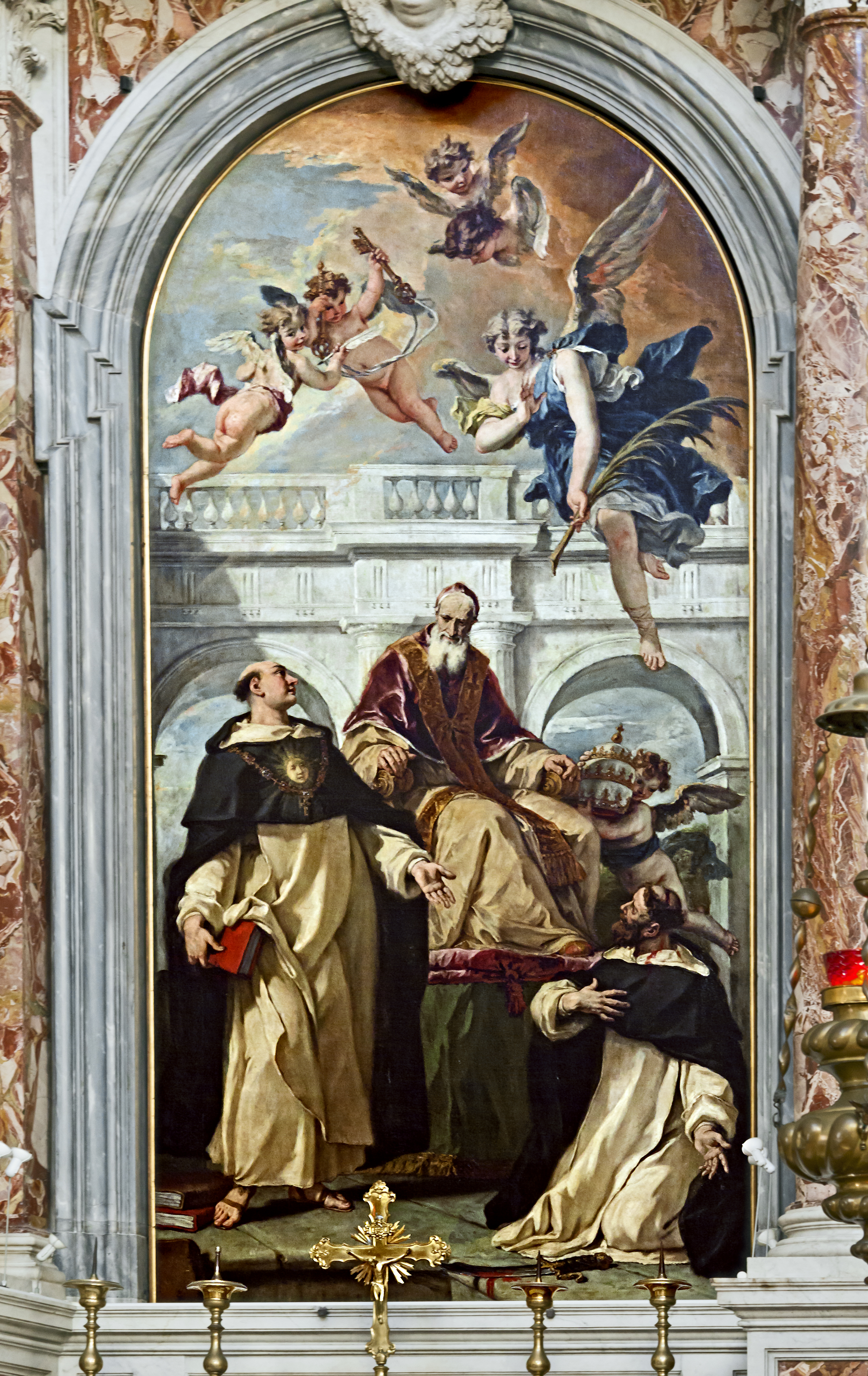
Sebastiano Ricci: Pope Pius V, Thomas Aquinas, St Peter Martyr

=== Interior ===
The decoration of the interior commenced in 1736, ten years after building started.

Although the outside walls make a plain rectangle, the interior of the nave (surrounded by Corinthian columns supporting an entablature with rounded corners) has the apparent shape of an ellipse. There are three altars set behind the line of the pillars on each side.

The nave is well lit on both sides by large high windows, which show off the contrasting tones of the white walls and grey stone.

=== Ceiling decoration ===
The ceiling decoration was entrusted to Giovanni Battista Tiepolo who signed a contract with the Dominicans in May 1737. It was completed by 1739. There are three frescos in the ceiling. Nearest the entrance is the Glory of St. Dominic (his assumption into heaven) and nearest the altar is the Appearance of the Virgin to St. Dominic, while in the centre is a large fresco, a great masterpiece, representing the Institution of the Rosary. The Virgin, in a blue sky with clouds, angels and cherubs, is supporting the Christ child who holds out the rosary to St Dominic. The saint stands at the top of a long flight of marble steps from which he is making the rosary available to the people, both rich and poor, including a doge and a pope. At the bottom, the darkest part of the painting, damned souls (heretics) tumble out of the picture frame. This was one of Tiepolo's first large fresco commissions.

There are also monochrome paintings on the ceilings and other high parts of the interior of the church. These were designed by Tiepolo but painted with help from assistants, though evidently tightly controlled by the master as it is impossible to attribute any of them to another hand. One of the monochrome paintings on the ceiling, near the High Altar, shows St. Dominic, kneeling, blessing a Dominican friar. Lorenzetti suggests that this may be Fra Paolo, the Dominican who was largely responsible for the building of the church.

=== Paintings ===
The paintings and sculptures in the nave are described in sequence from the main entrance door.

==== First altar on right ====
An oil painting on canvas by G.B. Tiepolo is above the first altar on the right. Although the canvas had been prepared by December 1739, the finished painting was not installed in the church until 1748.

It shows three female Dominican saints:

- St Catherine of Siena standing on the left, holding a cross with the crucified Christ.
- St Rose of Lima, standing on the right, holding the Christ child, who is holding a rose.
- St Agnes of Montepulciano (who had only been canonised in 1726), seated and holding a small cross.

Seated behind and above the three saints is the Madonna, seeming detached from and unnoticed by them.

==== Second altar on right ====
The second altar on the right bears a sculpture of angels carved in marble by Giovanni Maria Morlaiter (the first work he executed for the church; 1739) surrounding a small half-length painting of St Dominic (1743) by Giambattista Piazzetta.

==== Third altar on right ====
Above the third altar is an oil on canvas depiction of three male Dominican saints, by Giambattista Piazzetta, a topic chosen by the Dominicans to illustrate the missionary activities of their order. Despite the rich Rococo treatment of the subject, Michael Levey writes that the "real triumph of the painting is in its memorably austere tonality."

In black, in the foreground is St. Louis Bertrand, a Spanish saint who went as a missionary to the Caribbean, where a native priest was said to have tried to poison him (symbolised by the serpent in the chalice which he is holding). Beyond him, in white, is St Vincent Ferrer, who was said to have appeared to the former in a vision.

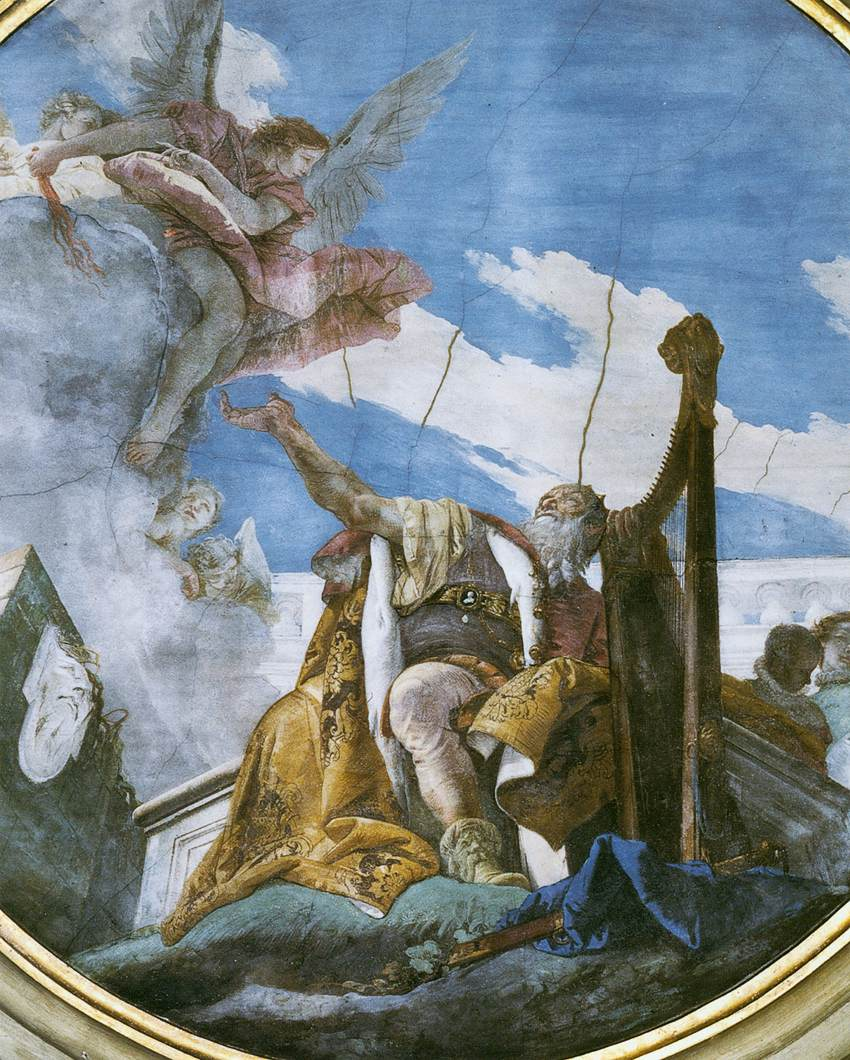
Giovanni Battista Tiepolo - King David Playing the Harp

The third saint is Saint Hyacinth, who went as a missionary to the East. He is holding his attributes, a monstrance and an image of the virgin and child, which he was said to have carried with him into the raging torrent of the Dneister from which he was miraculously saved.

==== First altar on left ====
On the left side of the nave, the altarpiece above the first altar is an oil painting by Sebastiano Ricci (1659–1734), celebrating three of the most famous Dominicans, Pope Pius V, Thomas Aquinas, and St Peter Martyr. Above them are three angels, one carrying a palm. It was the first work commissioned especially for the new building and was one of the last works of the artist, who died in 1734. It was painted in 1732–33.

Pope Pius V (who had been canonised in 1712) was a dedicated opponent of Protestantism. He greatly revered Thomas Aquinas (1225–1274), who is the figure on the left, and had made him a Doctor of the Church. He is identified by the Sun on his breast and by the book, his Summa Theologica, which he carries in his right hand.

St Peter Martyr, on the right, was another Dominican whose zeal had led to his assassination in 1252. He is more usually shown with the cleaver, with which he was killed, protruding from his head. Ricci shows it lying on the ground in front of him.

==== Second altar on left ====
The second altar has a statue by Antonio Rosa of the Madonna of the Rosary (1836). This replaced an earlier work which was thought inadequate.

==== Third altar on left ====
The third altar has a painting of the Crucifixion (circa 1560) by Tintoretto. This is the oldest painting inside the church (except for those in the sacristy). It was brought to the new church from the Church of the Visitation. It was in poor condition and the Dominicans arranged for it to be restored by Piazzetta in 1743.

=== Sculpture ===
Almost all the sculpture in the church is the work of Giovan Maria Morlaiter, a sculptor from over the Alps, whom Hugh Honour describes as "one of the ablest sculptors in eighteenth century Venice" and Semenzato as "the most brilliant interpreter of the rococo in Venetian sculpture", adding that "His work shows great dynamism" and "an inexhaustible felicity of invention". There is more of his work in the church than anywhere else in Venice.

Sculptures by Gian Maria Morlaiter

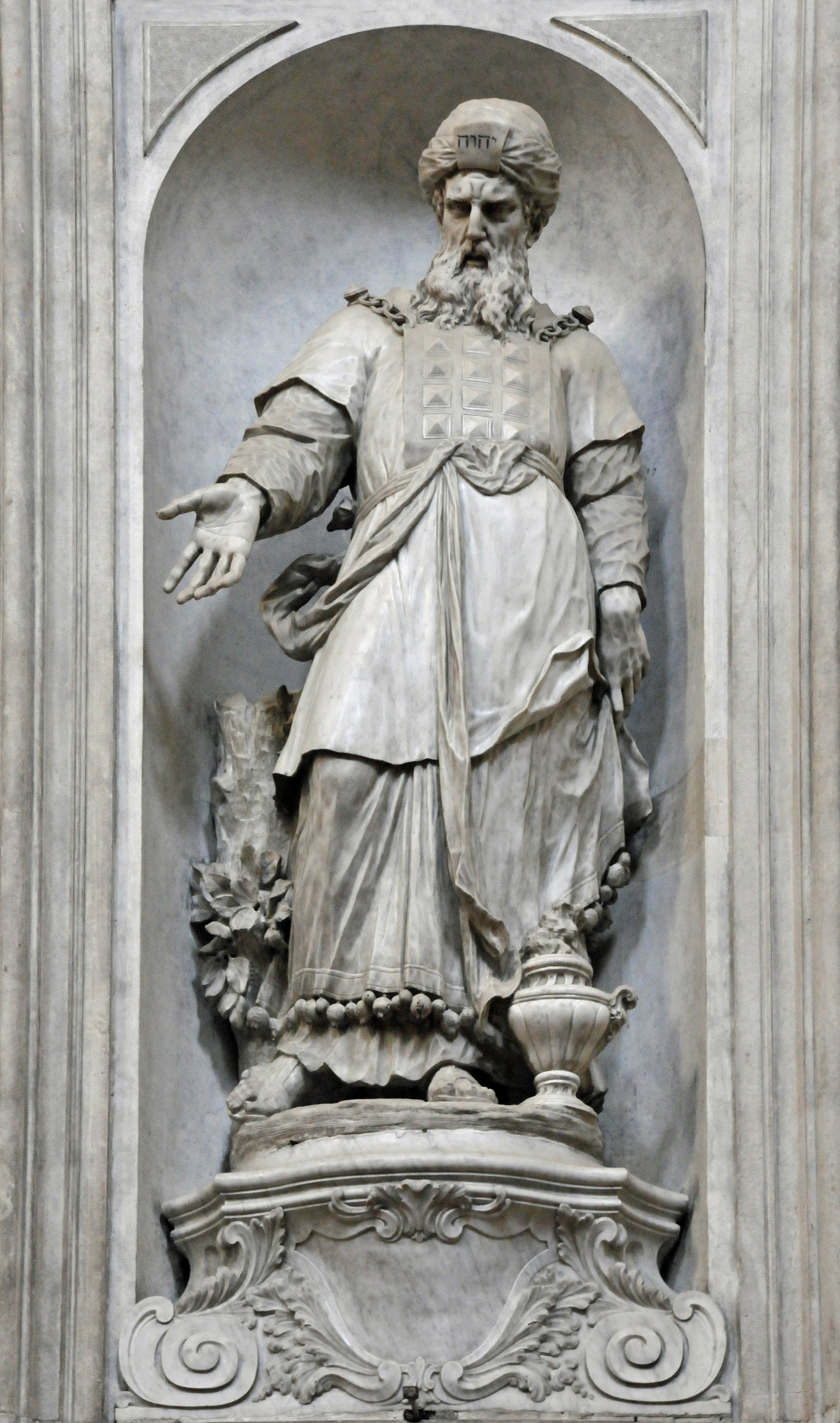
Prophet Aaron

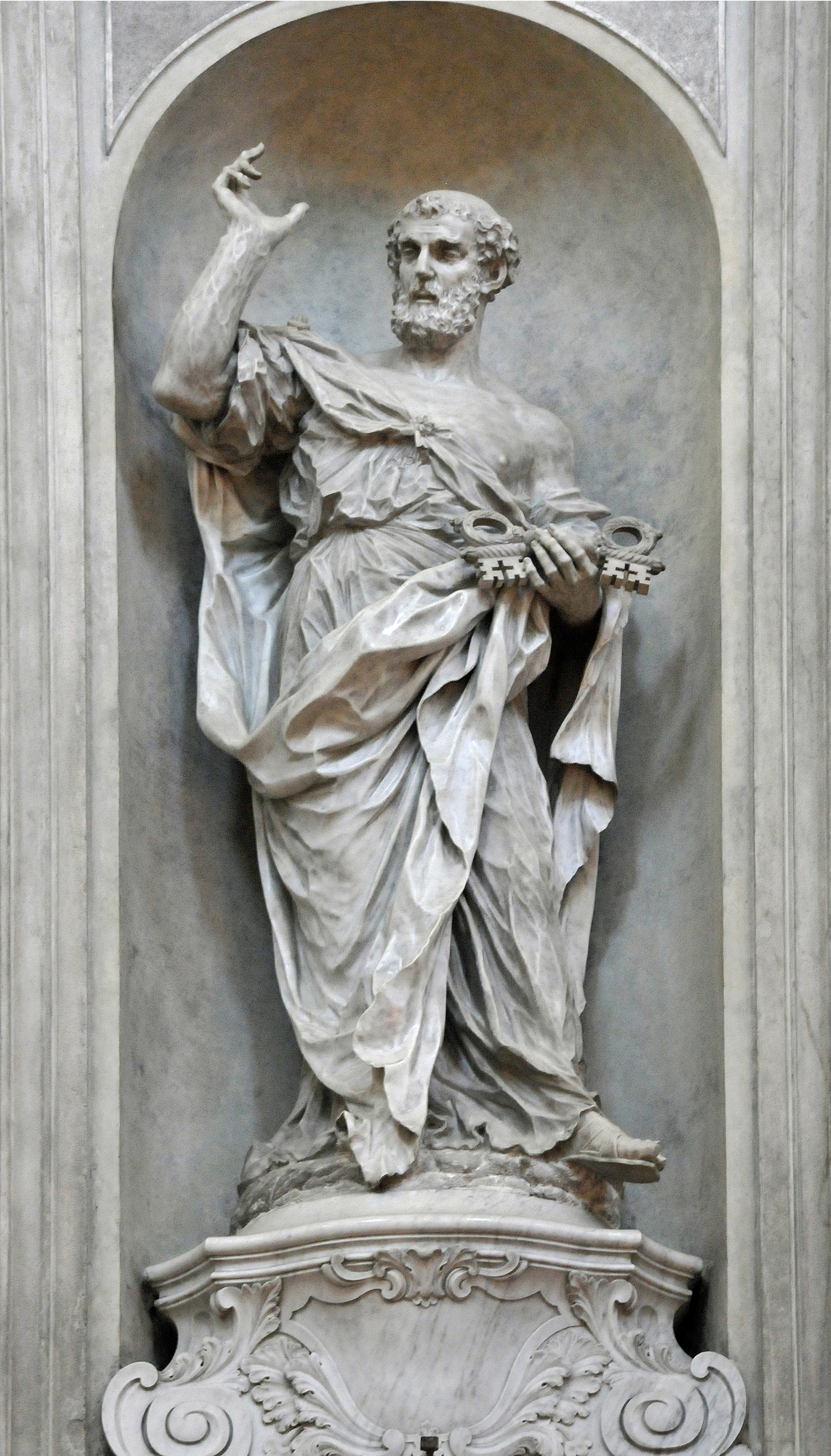
Saint Peter

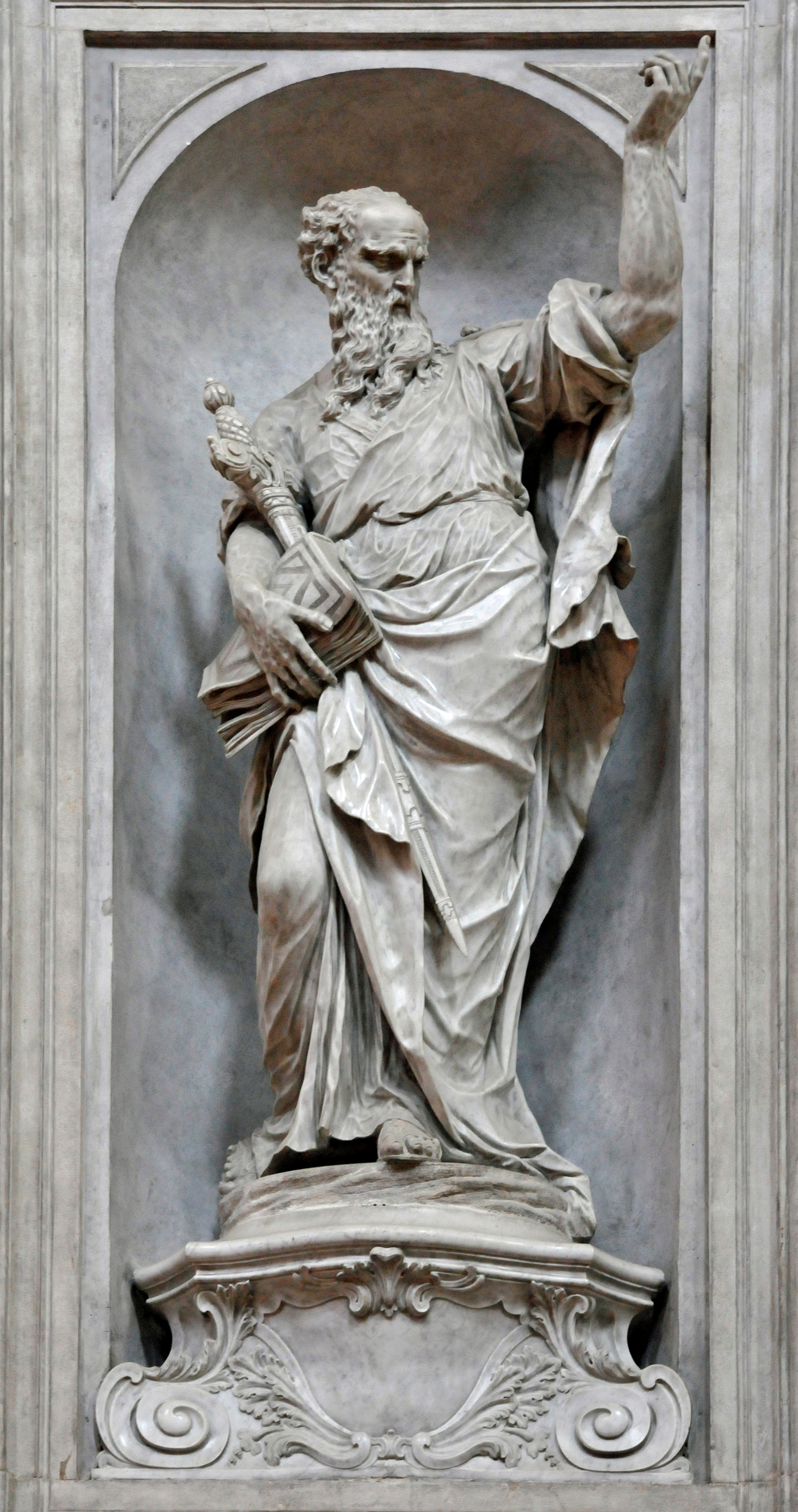
Saint Paul

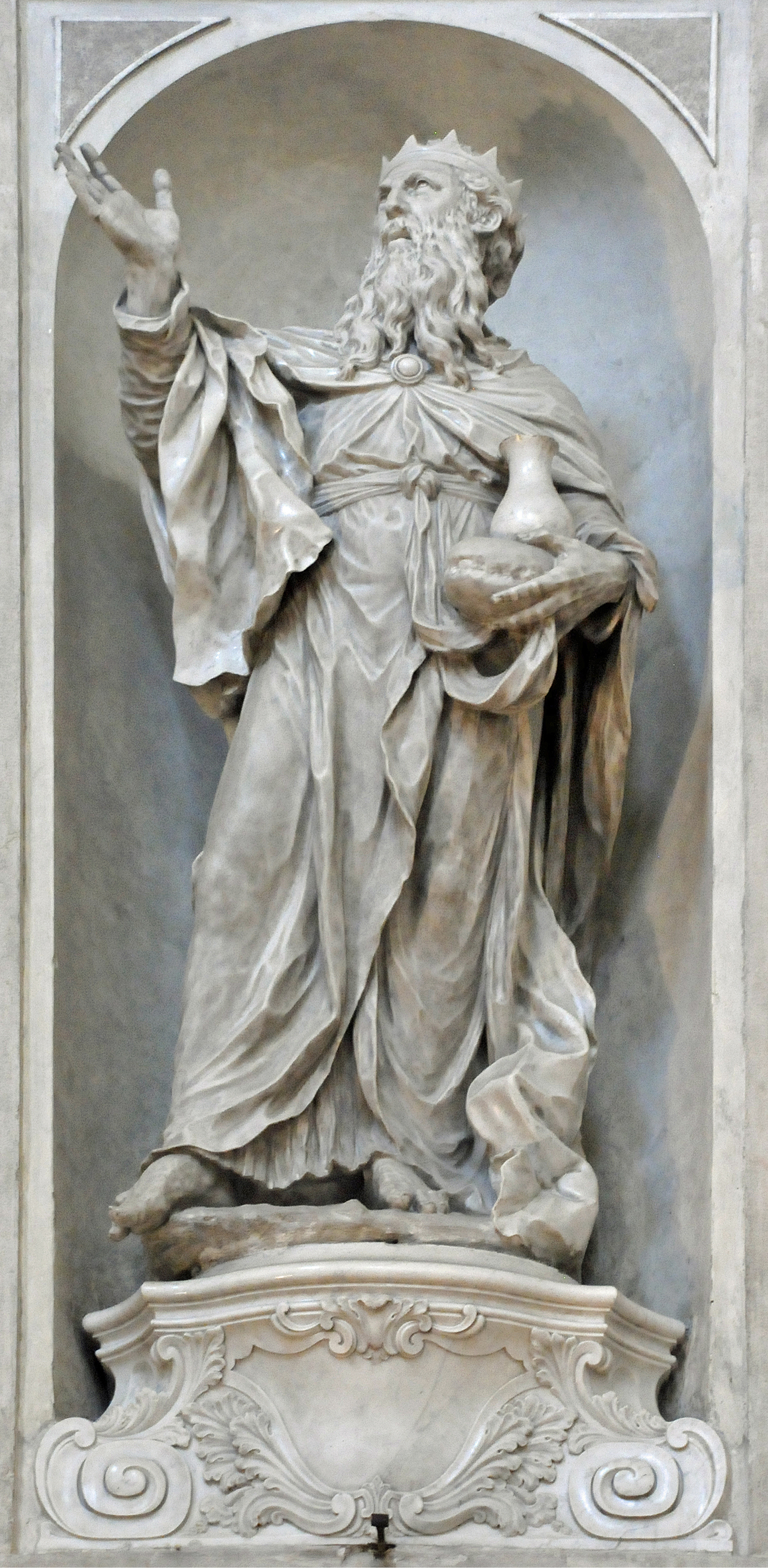
King Melchizedek

His first work for the church was the Glory of Angels on the second altar on the right (1738) and after this Massari engaged him for all the other principal works of sculpture, ending with the statue of Melchisedek in 1755.

These comprise:

- First altar on left – two cherubs
- Marble decoration of the High Altar
- Statues (with description – in brackets – of the bas reliefs above each of them):
  - First niche right: Abraham (Centurion begs Jesus to save his son)
  - Second niche right: Aaron (Healing of the blind man)
  - Third niche right: St Paul (Christ with the Magdalen)
  - First niche left: Melchisedek (St Peter walks on the water)
  - Second niche left: Moses (Healing of the paralytic)
  - Third niche left: St Peter (Christ and the Samaritan)

=== Organ, presbytery and high altar ===
On the left of the High Altar is the organ. The present organ (by the Bazzari brothers) was substituted in 1856 for the original organ of 1740.

On the right of the High Altar is the presbytery with a small early painting of the Madonna and Child on a gold ground. This is by Stefano di Sant'Agnese and is thought to date from 1375–80. It probably came from the former church of St. Agnes, which was nearby and is in International Gothic style. The church of St. Agnes was suppressed in 1810.

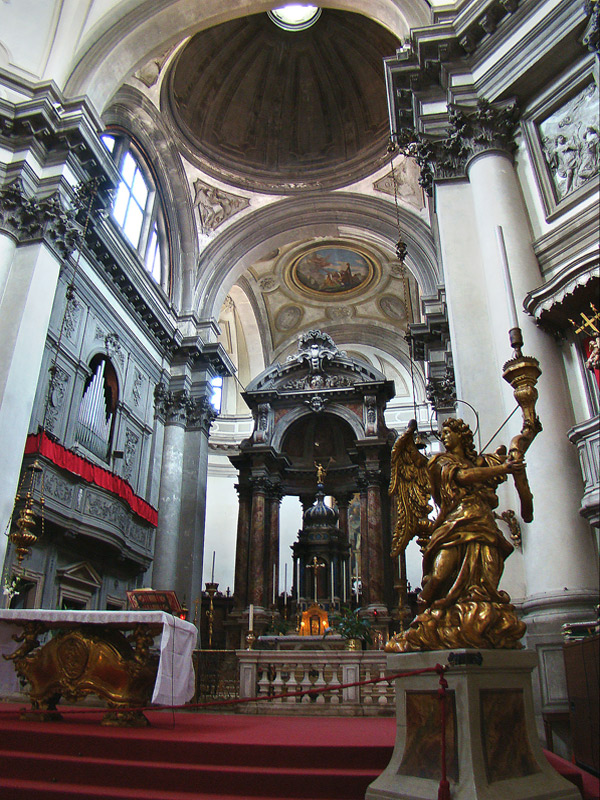
The high altar

The High Altar stands at the top of five steps under an architectural canopy supported by columns, underneath the cupola. The altar beneath is in a rococo style with coloured marbles and carved shells, heads of angels and reliefs of roses, ears of corn and grapes.

=== Choir ===
The choir, behind the main altar, has carved wooden stalls dating from between 1740 and 1744 and a ceiling painting by Tiepolo, of David playing the harp.
