= Charles Patin =

French physician and numismatist

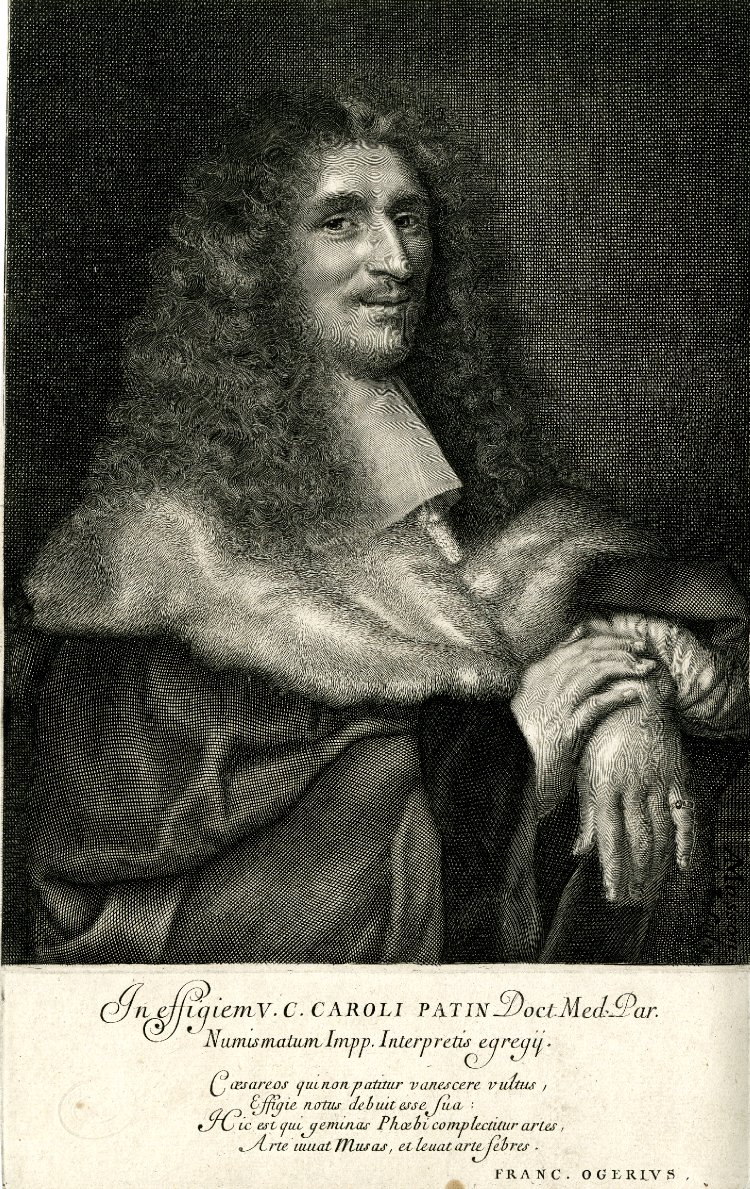
Charles Patin by Antoine Masson, 1685

Charles Patin (23 February 1633 – 10 October 1693) was a French physician and numismatist. He was the son of Guy Patin, dean of the school of medicine in Paris, and a friend of Jacob Spon. Trained first by his father, he obtained a law degree and then chose to study medicine. He became best known for his numismatic work. He married the moralist author Madeleine Hommetz: their daughter Gabrielle-Charlotte Patin became a painter and numismatist, and their daughter Charlotte-Catherine Patin became a writer.
