= Accademia Galileiana =

Coordinates: 45.4076°N 11.8710°E

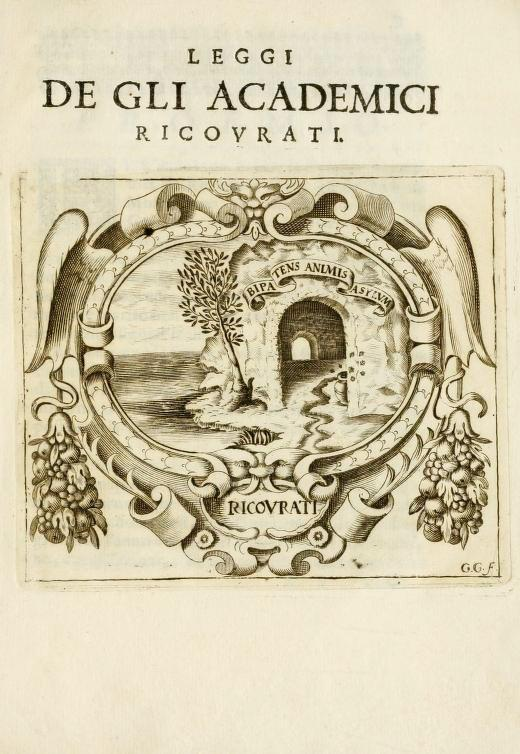
Title page of the Leggi de gli Academici Ricovrati (1648) with the emblem of the bipatens animis asylum

The Accademia Galileiana ('Galilean academy') is a learned society in the city of Padua in Italy. The full name of the society is Accademia galileiana di scienze, lettere ed arti in Padova ('Galilean academy of science, letters and the arts in Padova'). It was founded as the Accademia dei Ricovrati in Padua in 1599, on the initiative of a Venetian nobleman, Federico Cornaro. The original members were professors in the University of Padua such as professor Georgios Kalafatis; one of its original members was Galileo Galilei. In 1779 the academy merged with the Accademia di Arte Agraria (founded in 1769) and became the Accademia di Scienze Lettere e Arti; in 1949 it became the Accademia Patavina di Scienze, Lettere ed Arti; its name was changed to Accademia Galileiana di Scienze, Lettere ed Arti in Padova in 1997, in honor of Galileo. The academy is lodged in the Carraresi Palace in Padua.

== The "Ricovrati" ==
The name "ricovrati" literally means 'sheltered' and the academy took its name from a line from Boethius, "Bipatens animis asylum" (Latin, 'a sanctuary of the soul open at both ends'), related to a scene by Homer (Odyssey, book 13) describing a cave, open at both ends, and sheltered by an olive tree. This image was used in their heraldic badge.

== Female members ==
At the end of the 17th century, the Academy of the Ricovrati was one of the few in Europe which had female members. These included the first woman in Europe to receive a university diploma, Elena Cornaro Piscopia. Other female members included Anne Dacier, Madeleine de Scudéry, Maria Selvaggia Borghini, and Marie-Catherine de Villedieu. Female membership in this period was only honorary and female members did not have the right to vote or occupy administrative posts in the academy. Of the 25 women admitted to the society between the 17th and 18th century, only four were Italian; the others were French and did not attend meetings.

== The Enlightenment ==
Antonio Vallisneri became president of the academy in 1722, and proceeded to enact a series of reforms based on the principles of the Enlightenment. He also instigated a series of debates on the education of women and their inclusion in such academies.

== Notable members ==
Galileo Galilei • Cesare Cremonini • Fortunio Liceti • Elena Cornaro Piscopia •Clemente Sibiliato • Antonino Valsecchi • Antoinette Deshoulières • Anne-Marie du Boccage • Marie-Jeanne L'Héritier de Villandon • Catherine Bernard • Marie-Catherine d'Aulnoy • Marie-Catherine de Villedieu • Charlotte-Rose de Caumont La Force • Anne Dacier • Madeleine Patin • Madeleine de Scudéry • Maria Selvaggia Borghini • Georgios Kalafatis (professor)
