= Saint-Rémy-du-Val =

- Commune
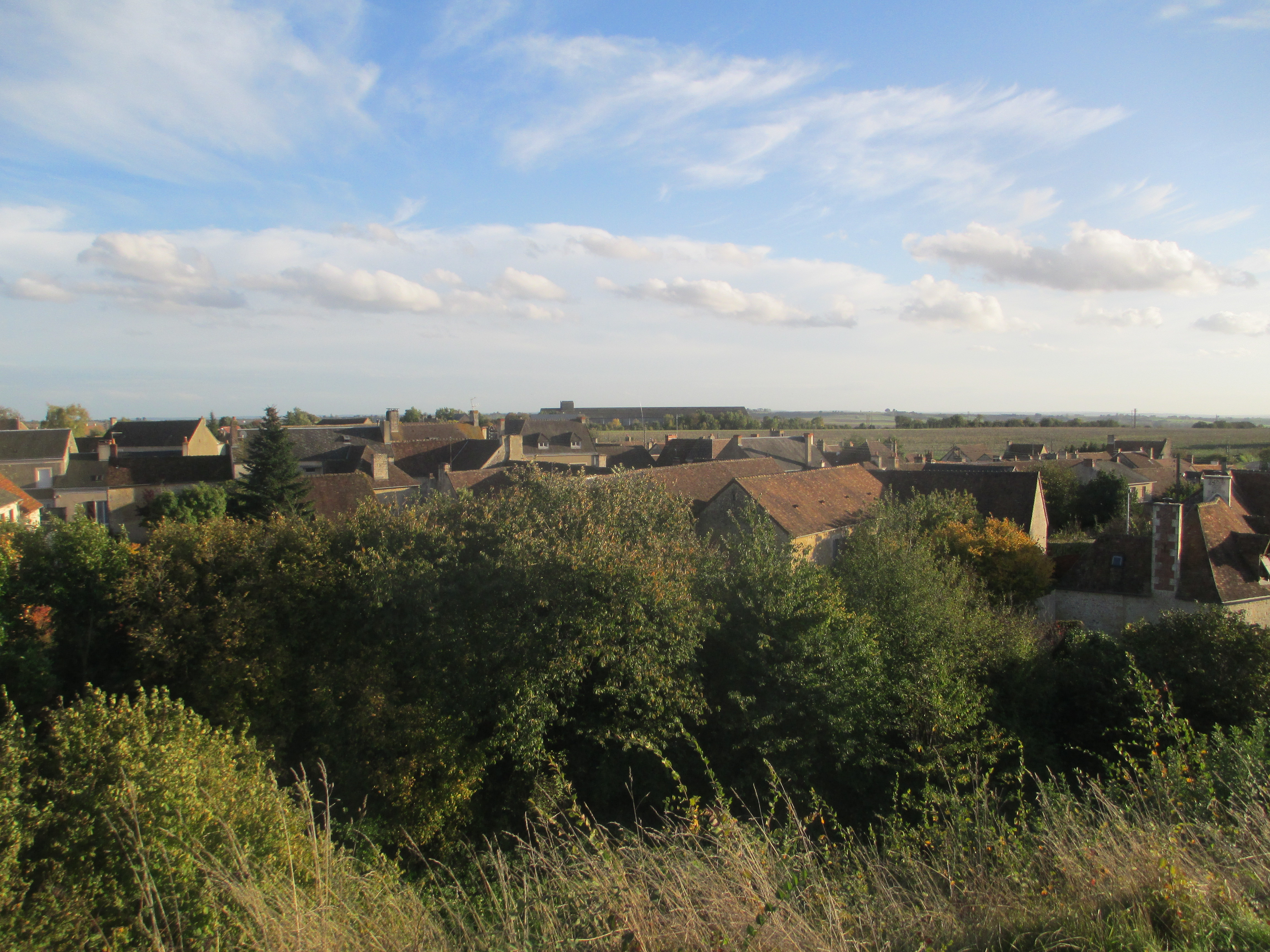
- Saint-Rémy-du-Val seen from the ruins of the chateau

- Coat of arms
- Location of Saint-Rémy-du-Val
- Location within France Location within Pays de la Loire
- Coordinates: 48°20′59″N 0°15′17″E
- Country: France
- Region: Pays de la Loire
- Department: Sarthe
- Arrondissement: Mamers
- Canton: Mamers
- Intercommunality: Maine Saosnois

Government
  - Mayor (2020–2026): Fabienne Ménager
- Area^{1}: 16.54 km^{2} (6.39 sq mi)
- Elevation: 160 m (520 ft)
- Highest elevation: 210 m (690 ft)
- Lowest elevation: 98 m (322 ft)
- Population (2023): 493
  - Density: 29.8/km^{2} (77.2/sq mi)
- Time zone: UTC+01:00 (CET)
  - Summer (DST): UTC+02:00 (CEST)
- INSEE/Postal code: 72317 /72600
- ^{1} French Land Register data, which excludes lakes, ponds, glaciers > 1 km^{2} (0.386 sq mi or 247 acres) and river estuaries.

Saint-Rémy-du-Val (French pronunciation: [sɛ̃ ʁemi dy val]) is a commune in the Sarthe department in the region of Pays de la Loire in north-western France.

== See also ==
- Communes of the Sarthe department
- Parc naturel régional Normandie-Maine
