= Maria Selvaggia Borghini =

Italian poet and translator (1656–1731)

Maria Selvaggia Borghini (1656–1731) was an Italian poet and translator.

== Works ==
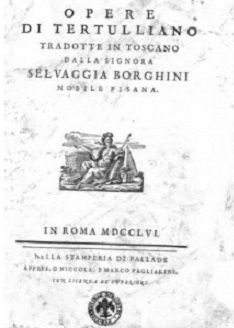
Opere di Tertulliano

- Rime della Signora Lucrezia Marinella, Veronica Gambara and Isabella della Morra, con giunta di quelle fin’ora [sic] raccolte della Signora Maria Selvaggia Borghini, Napoli: Bulifon 1693
- Rime di cinquanta illustri poetesse di nuovo date in luce da Antonio Bulifon, Napoli: Bulifon 1695
- Componimenti poetici delle più illustri rimatrici raccolti da Luisa Bergalli, Venezia, Mora 1726
- Raccolta del Recanati, Venezia 1716
- Raccolta del Redi
- Opere di Tertulliano tradotte in Toscano dalla Signora Selvaggia Borghini, Nobile Pisana, Roma, Pagliarini 1756
- Saggio di Poesia, a cura di Domenico Moreni, Firenze, Margheri 1827
- Lettera e sonetto di Maria Selvaggia Borghini finora inediti, a cura di Emilio Bianchi, Pisa, Nistri 1872
- Per le nozze del sig. cav. conte Alfredo Agostini Venerosi Della Seta patrizio pisano colla nobile donzella Teresa contessa Marcello patrizia veneta, Pisa, 1882
- Il Canzoniere di Maria Selvaggia Borghini, a cura di Agostino Agostini, Alessandro Panajia, Pisa, ETS 2001
