= Guy Patin =

French doctor and man of letters

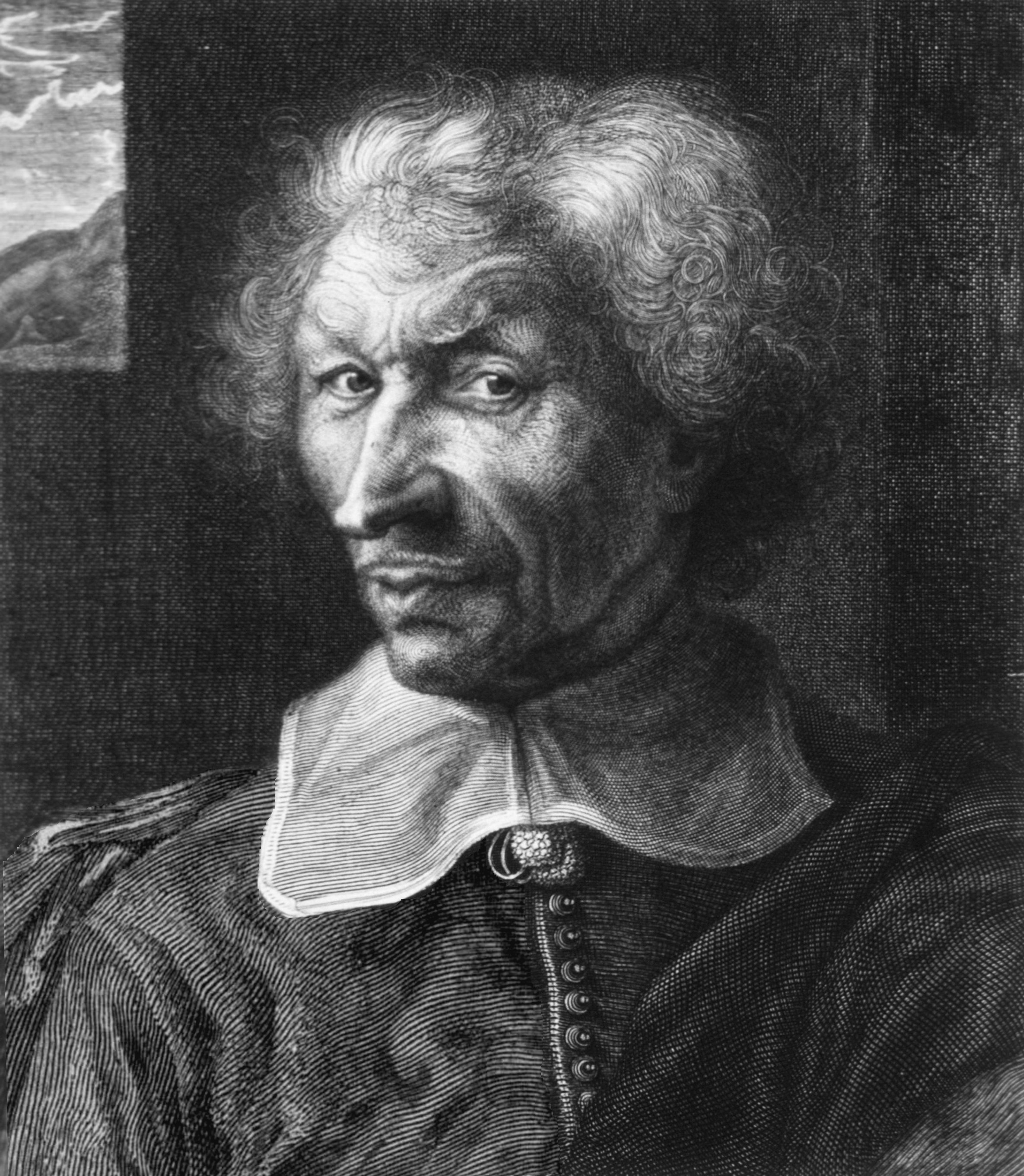
Guy Patin by Antoine Masson

Guy (or Guido) Patin (1601 in Hodenc-en-Bray, Oise – 30 August 1672 in Paris) was a French physician and man of letters.

Patin was doyen (or dean) of the Faculty of Medicine in Paris (1650–1652) and professor in the Collège de France starting in 1655. His scientific and medical works are not considered particularly enlightened by modern medical scholars (he has sometimes been compared to the doctors in the works of Molière). He is most well known today for his extensive correspondence: his style was light and playful (he has been compared to early 17th century philosophical libertines), and his letters are an important document for historians of medicine. Patin and his son Charles were also dealers in clandestine books, and Patin wrote occasional poetry (such as a quatrain to honor Henric Piccardt (1636–1712).

On 22 March 1648, Patin wrote a famous letter commenting on the new rage of tea drinking in Paris, calling it "the impertinent novelty of the century", and mentioning the new book by Dr. Philibert Morisset titled Ergo Thea Chinesium, Menti Confert (Does Chinese Tea Increase Mentality?), which praises tea as a panacea:

One of our doctors, named Morisset, who is much more of a braggart than a skilful man ... caused a thesis on tea to be published here. Everybody disapproved of it; there were some of our doctors who burned it, and protests were made to the dean for having approved the thesis.

Naudaeana et Patiniana, ou, Singularitez Remarquables, recording conversations between Patin and his great friend Gabriel Naudé, librarian of the Bibliothèque Mazarine, was edited by Jean-Aymar Piganiol de La Force and published in Paris, 1701; a revised edition with a Preface by Pierre Bayle appeared in Amsterdam, 1703.

== See also ==
- Fibrodysplasia ossificans progressiva

== Sources ==
- Gustave Vapereau, Dictionnaire universel des littératures, Paris, Hachette, 1876, p. 1554.
- Thèse de l’École des chartes de Laure Jestaz (2001)
- Françoise Waquet, Guy et Charles Patin, père et fils, et la contrebande du livre à Paris au XVIIe siècle in Journal des savants, 1979, n°2. pp. 125–148.
- Loïc Capron, Correspondance française de Guy Patin, édition critique en ligne sur le site de la Bibliothèque interuniversitaire de Santé
