= Collective 18th-century biographies of literary women =

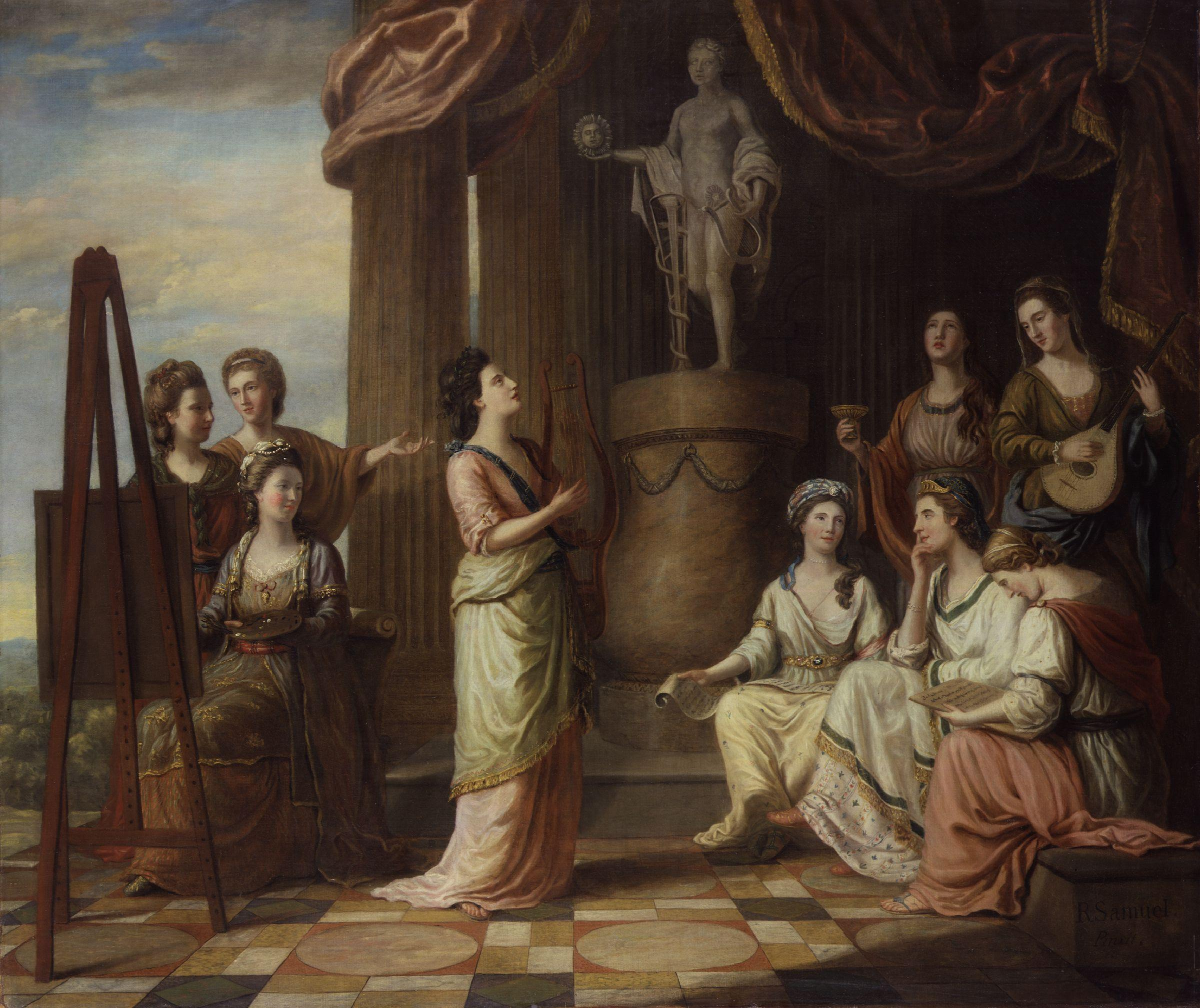
Portraits in the Characters of the Muses in the Temple of Apollo by Richard Samuel, 1778, include Elizabeth Carter, Angelica Kauffman, Anna Laetitia Barbauld, Catharine Macaulay, Elizabeth Montagu, Elizabeth Griffith, Hannah More, Elizabeth Ann Sheridan and Charlotte Lennox. Use a cursor to see who is who.

During the eighteenth century, there were several attempts to describe a "women's literary tradition." This table compares six eighteenth-century collections of notable women: George Ballard's Memoirs of several ladies of Great Britain (1752), John Duncombe's The Feminead (1754), the Biographium Faemineum (Anon., 1766), Mary Scott's The Female Advocate (1775), Richard Polwhele's The Unsex'd Females (1798), and Mary Hay's Female Biography (1803).

== Collective 18th-century biographies of literary women ==
As the focus of this chart is British literary figures, broadly defined, two of the texts have been treated selectively because of their wider range. Three of these texts are collective biographies, while three of them are more pointed political interventions in contemporary debates about women's roles. Three are poems and three are dictionaries, but they all list, and comment on, literary women and their accomplishments.

NB: In the columns, readers can find subjects' names or pseudonyms as presented in the text. A number in front of a name indicates the relative position of that name in the text. Users may reorder some elements of the table.

Subject	Dates	Ballard's Memoirs (1752)	Duncombe's Feminead (1757)	Biographium (1766)	Scott's Female advocate (1775)	Polwhele's Unsex'd females (1798)	Hays's Female Biography (1803)
Anon.	1773 (fl.)	—	—	—	"A lady"	—	—
Aragon, Catherine of	1485–1536	Queen Catherine	—	"Queen Catherine, Queen of Henry VIII"	—	—	—
Armine, Mary	1676 (death)	—	—	—	—	—	Lady Mary Armyne
Arundell, Mary	1557 (death)	Mary Countess of Arundel	—	Countess of Arundel	—	—	Mary, Countess of Arundel
Ascham, Margaret	1528–1592	Margaret Ascham	—	Margaret Ascham	—	—	Margaret Ascham
Askew, Anne	1521–1546	Anne Askew, Alias Kyme	—	Anne Askew	—	—	Anne Askew
Astell, Mary	1666–1731	Mary Astell	—	"Mary Astell, an Ingenius Writer"	—	—	Mary Astell
Bacon, Ann	1528–1610	Lady Bacon	—	"Lady Anna Bacon, Governess to Edward VI"	11. "Mores, Seymours, Cokes, a bright assemblage" (l. 83)	—	Lady Bacon
Barbauld, Anna Laetitia	1743–1825	—	—	—	43. Aiken	02. "veteran BARBAULD"/Miss Aiken	—
Barber, Mary	1685–1755	—	—	—	23. "HIBERNIA'S other fav'rite name" (l. 195)	—	—
Basset, Mary	1523 – 1572	Mary Roper	—	"Mary Roper, [grand]Daughter of Thomas More"	07. "Mores, Seymours, Cokes, a bright assemblage" (l. 83)	—	Mary Roper
Baynard, Ann	1672–1697	Anne Baynard	—	Anne Bayard	—	—	Ann Baynard
Beauclerk, Diana	1734–1808	—	—	—	—	18. BEAUCLERK	—
Beaufort, Margaret	1443–1509	Margaret Countess of Richmond and Derby	—	Margaret, Countess of Richmond and Derby	—	—	Margaret Beaufort
Behn, Aphra	1640–1689	—	06. Behn	Afra Behn	—	—	Aphara Behn
Berners, Juliana	1388 (birth)	Juliana Barnes, Alias Berners	—	"Juliana Barnes, A Prioress"	—	—	Juliana Berners, or Barnes
Bland, Elizabeth	1681–1712 (fl.)	Elizabeth Bland	—	—	—	—	Elizabeth Bland
Boevey, Catherina	1669–1726	Catherine Bovey	—	Catherine Bovey	—	—	Catherine Bovey
Bradstreet, Anne	1612–1672	—	—	"Anne Broadstreet, A Poetess of New England"	—	—	Anne Broadstreet
Brooke, Frances	1724–1789	—	17. CÆLIA/Mrs. Brooke	—	—	—	—
Burnet, Elizabeth	1661–1709	Elizabeth Burnet	—	Elizabeth Burnet	—	—	Elizabeth Burnet
Burney, Frances	1752–1840	—	—	—	—	16. BURNEY	—
Burrell, Sophia	1753–1802	—	—	—	—	lady Burrell	—
Bury, Elizabeth	1644–1720	Elizabeth Bury	—	"Elizabeth Bury, Versed in all the Sciences"	—	—	Elizabeth Bury
Carter, Elizabeth	1717–1806	—	16. ELIZA/Miss Eliza C---	—	—	11. CARTER	—
Cavendish, Elizabeth	1626–1663	Elizabeth Countess of Bridgwater	—	Countess of Bridwater	—	—	—
Cavendish, Margaret	1624-1674	Margaret Dutchess of Newcastle	—	Margaret, Dutchess of Newcastle	16. NEWCASTLE	—	Margaret Cavendish, duchess of Newcastle
Celesia, Dorothea	1738–1790	—	—	—	39. "INDOLENCE"	—	—
Centlivre, Susannah	1669–1723	—	05. Centlivre	Susannah Centlivre	—	—	Susannah Centrelivre
Chandler, Mary	1687–1745	—	—	Mary Chandler	24. CHANDLER	—	Mary Chandler
Chapone, Hester	1727–1801	—	21. DELIA	—	Mrs. Chapone	12. CHAPONE	Mrs. Chapone
Chidley, Katherine	1616–1653 (fl.)	Katherine Chidley	—	Katherine Chidleigh	—	—	—
Chudleigh, Mary	1656–1710	Lady Chudleigh	—	Lady Mary Chudleigh	21. CHUDLEIGH	—	Lady Mary Chudleigh
Clement, Margaret	1508–1570	Margaret Clement	—	Margaret Clement	—	—	Margaret Clement
Clifford, Anne	1590–1676	Anne Countess of Pempbroke	—	Anne, Countess of Pembroke	—	—	Anne Clifford, countess of Pembroke, Dorset and Montgomery
Clinton, Elizabeth	1570–1638	Elizabeth Countess of Lincoln	—	Elizabeth Lincoln	—	—	Elizabeth, countess of Lincoln
Cockburn, Catharine Trotter	1679–1749	—	03. COCKBURN	Catherine Cockburn	—	—	Catherine Cockburn
Cooke, Mildred	1526–1689	Lady Burleigh	—	Mildred Burleigh	13. "Mores, Seymours, Cokes, a bright assemblage" (l. 83)	—	Lady Mildred Burleigh
Cooper, Elizabeth	1698–1761	—	—	—	27. "Thou who did'st pierce the shades of gothic night" (l. 235)	—	—
Craven, Elizabeth	1750–1828	—	—	—	—	Margravine of Ansbach	—
Crewe, Emma	1780–1850	—	—	—	—	09. EMMA CREWE	—
Dauncey, Elizabeth	1506–1564	Elizabeth Dancy	—	—	05. "Mores, Seymours, Cokes, a bright assemblage" (l. 83)	—	Elizabeth Dancy
Davies, Eleanor	1590–1652	Lady Eleanor Davies	—	Lady Eleanor Davies	—	—	Lady Eleanor Davies
Dobson, Susannah	1742–1795	—	—	—	—	Mrs. Dobson	—
Du Bois, Dorothea	1728–1774	—	—	—	—	—	Dorothea Dubois
Duncombe, Susanna	1725–1812	—	20. EUGENIA	—	—	—	—
Elstob, Elizabeth	1683–1756	—	—	—	—	—	Elizabeth Elstob
Fane, Elizabeth	1568 (death)	Lady Elizabeth Fane	—	Lady Elizabeth Fane	—	—	Lady Elizabeth Fane
Fielding, Sarah	1710–1768	—	—	—	28. FIELDING	—	Sarah Fielding
Finch, Anne	1661–1720	Anne Countess of Winchelsea	02. WINCHELSEA	Countess of Winchelsea	—	—	Anne Finch, countess of Winchilsea
FitzAlan, Mary	1540–1557	Lady Mary Howard	—	"Lady Mary Howard, Wife of Thomas Duke of Norfolk"	—	—	—
Gethin, Grace	1676–1697	Lady Gethin	—	Lady Grace Gethia	—	—	Lady Grace Gethin
Greville, Frances	1724–1789	—	—	—	33. GREVILLE	—	—
Grey, Katherine	1540–1568	—	—	—	Lady Catherine Grey	—	—
Grey, Jane	1537–1554	Lady Jane Gray	—	Lady Jane Gray	02. "beauteous Dudley" (l. 37)	lady Jane Gray	Lady Jane Gray
Grierson, Constantia	1705-1732	Constantia Grierson	—	"Constantia Grierson, an Irish Lady"	22. CONSTANTIA	—	Constantia Grierson
Griffith, Elizabeth	1727–1793	—	—	—	31. "another SAPPHO with a purer mind" (l. 280)	—	—
Halkett, Anne	1623–1699	Lady Halket	—	Anna Halket	—	—	Lady Anna Halket
Harcourt, Harriet Eusebia	1705–1745	—	—	Harriot Eusebia Harcourt	—	—	Harriet Eusebia Harcourt
Hastings, Elizabeth	1682–1739	—	—	Lady Elizabeth Hastings	—	—	Lady Elizabeth Hastings
Hays, Mary	1759–1843	—	—	—	—	07. "flippant HAYS"	—
Haywood, Eliza	1693–1756	—	—	—	—	—	Elizabeth Haywood
Heron, Cecily	1507 (birth)	Cecilia Heron	—	"Cecilia Heron, Daughter of Sir Thomas More"	06. "Mores, Seymours, Cokes, a bright assemblage" (l. 83)	—	Cecilia Heron
Hopton, Susanna	1627–1709	Susanna Hopton	—	Susanna Hopton	—	—	Susanna Hopton
Howard, Jane	1537–1593	Jane Countess of Westmoreland	—	Jane, Countess of Westmoreland	—	—	—
Inglis, Esther	1570-1624	Esther Inglis	—	"Esther Inglis, famous for Fine Writing"	—	—	Esther Inglis
Ingram, Anne	1696–1764	—	12. IRWIN	—	—	—	—
Jebb, Ann	1735–1812	—	—	—	—	"a Jebb"	—
Jones, Mary	1707–1778	—	—	—	25. JONES	—	—
Kauffman, Angelica	1741–1807	—	—	—	—	08. "classic KAUFFMAN"	—
Kempe, Margery	1373-1440	Margery Kempe	—	Margery Kempe	—	—	—
Killigrew, Anne	1660–1685	Anne Killigrew	—	Anne Killigrew	17. "illustrious KILLIGREW" (l. 93)	—	Anne Killigrew
Killigrew, Catherine	1530-1583	Katherine Killigrew	—	Katharine Killigrew	14. "Mores, Seymours, Cokes, a bright assemblage" (l. 83)	—	Katherine Killigrew
Leapor, Mary	1722–1746	—	15. Young LEAPOR	—	—	—	Mary Leapor
Legge, Elizabeth	1580–1685	Elizabeth Legge	—	Elizabeth Legge	—	—	Elizabeth Legge
Lennox, Charlotte	1730–1804	—	—	—	30. LENOX	—	—
Lucar, Elizabeth	1510–1537	Elizabeth Lucar	—	Elizabeth Lucar	—	—	Elizabeth Lucar
Lumley, Jane	1537–1578	Lady Joanna Lumley	—	"Joanna Lumley, Wife of John Lord Lumley"	—	—	Joanna, lady Lumley
Macaulay, Catharine	1731–1791	—	—	—	35. MACAULAY	"a Macaulay"	Catherine Macaulay Graham
Madan, Judith	1702–1781	—	14. CORNELIA	—	—	—	—
Manley, Delarivier	1663–1724	—	04. "modern Manley"	—	—	—	—
Marie de France	1160–1215 (fl.)	—	—	—	—	—	"Mary, an Anglo-Norman poetess"
Masham, Damaris Cudworth	1658–1708	Lady Masham	—	Lady Damaris Mashain	—	—	Damaris, lady Masham
Masters, Mary	1698–1761	—	—	—	26. "ingenious MASTERS" (l. 223)	—	—
Monck, Mary	1677–1715	Honourable Mrs. Monk	—	"Mrs. Hon. Monk, Daughter of Lord Molesworth"	20. MIRANDA	—	Mrs. Monk
Montagu, Elizabeth	1718–1800	—	—	—	38. MONTAGU	10. MONTAGU	—
More, Hannah	1745–1833	—	—	—	Miss More	21. MORE	—
North, Dudleya	1675–1712	Honourable Mrs. Dudleya North	—	"Hon. Mrs. Dudley North, a Daughter of Lord North and Grey"	—	—	Honorable Mrs. Dudley North
Norton, Frances	1640–1731	Lady Norton	—	—	—	—	Lady Frances Norton
Norwich, Julian of	1343–1443	Juliana, Anchoret of Norwich	—	Juliana, Anchoret of Norwich	—	—	Juliana (anchoret of Norwich)
Pakington, Dorothy	1623–1679	Lady Pakington	—	"Dorothy Pakington, Wife of Sir John Pakington"	—	—	Dorothy, Lady Pakington
Parr, Catherine	1512–1548	Queen Katherine Parr	—	"Catherine Parr, Queen of Henry VIII"	01. "Illustrious Parr" (l. 32)	—	—
Parry, Blanche	1508-1589	Blanch Parry	—	"Blanch Parry, Maid of Honour to Queen Elizabeth"	—	—	—
Peckard, Martha	1729–1805	—	18. CLIO	—	—	—	—
Pennington, Elizabeth	1732–1759	—	19. FLAVIA	—	—	—	—
Pennington, Sarah	1720–1783	—	—	—	37. PENNINGTON	—	—
Philips, Katherine	1631–1664	Katherine Philips	01. "[T]he chaste ORINDA"	"Katherine Phillips, the Famous Orinda"	18. "our fair ORINDA" (l. 101)	—	Katherine Phillips
Phillips, Teresia Constantia	1709–1765	—	07. Philips	—	—	—	—
Pilkington, Laetitia	1709–1750	—	08. Pilkington	"Mrs. Loetitia Pilkington of Ireland"	Mrs. Pilkington	—	Laetitia Pilkington
Pix, Mary	1666–1709	—	—	—	—	—	Mrs. Pix
Pye, Jael	1737–1782	—	—	—	42. "THOU" (l. 415)	—	—
Radcliffe, Ann	1764–1823	—	—	—	—	17. RADCLIFFE	—
Rich, Mary	1625–1678	—	—	—	—	—	Mary, countess of Warwick
Roberts, Rose	1730–1788	—	—	—	41. "THOU" (l. 407)	—	—
Robinson, Maria Elizabeth	1775–1818	—	—	—	—	"her (Mary Robinson's) beautiful daughter"	—
Robinson, Mary	1757–1800	—	—	—	—	03. ROBINSON	—
Roper, Margaret	1505–1544	Margaret Roper	—	"Margaret Roper, Daughter of Sir Thomas More"	04. "Mores, Seymours, Cokes, a bright assemblage" (l. 83)	—	Margaret Roper
Rowe, Elizabeth Singer	1674–1737	—	10. ROWE	Elizabeth Rowe	—	Mrs. Rowe	Elizabeth Rowe
Rowlett, Margaret	1558 (death)	(brief mention)	—	—	15. "Mores, Seymours, Cokes, a bright assemblage" (l. 83)	—	—
Russell, Elizabeth	1528–1609	Lady Russel	—	Lady Elizabeth Russel	12. "Mores, Seymours, Cokes, a bright assemblage" (l. 83)	—	Lady Russel
Russell, Lucy	1580–1627	—	—	—	—	—	Lucy Haerin
Russell, Rachel	1636–1723	—	—	—	19. RUSSELL	—	Lady Rachel Russel
Seward, Anna	1742–1809	—	—	—	—	13. SEWARD	—
Seymour, Anne	1538–1588	Lady Anne Seymour	—	Anne Seymour	08. "Mores, Seymours, Cokes, a bright assemblage" (l. 83)	—	Ladies Anne, Margaret, and Jane Seymour
Seymour, Frances	1699 (birth)	—	11. SOMERSET	—	—	—	—
Seymour, Jane	1541–1561	Lady Jane Seymour	—	—	10. "Mores, Seymours, Cokes, a bright assemblage" (l. 83)	—	Ladies Anne, Margaret, and Jane Seymour
Seymour, Margaret	1540 (birth)	Lady Margaret Seymour	—	—	09. "Mores, Seymours, Cokes, a bright assemblage" (l. 83)	—	Ladies Anne, Margaret, and Jane Seymour
Sheridan, Frances	1724–1766	—	—	—	—	—	Frances Sheridan
Sidney, Mary	1561–1621	Mary Countess of Pembroke	—	Mary Sydney Pembroke	The Countess of Pembroke	—	Mary Sydney, countess of Pembroke
Smith, Charlotte Turner	1749–1806	—	—	—	—	04. "charming SMITH"	—
Spencer, Dorothy	1617–1684	—	—	—	—	—	Dorothy, countess of Sunderland
Steele, Anne	1717–1778	—	—	—	32. "Theodosia"	—	—
Stuart, Arabella	1575–1615	Lady Arabella Seymour	—	Arabella Seymour	—	—	Lady Arabella Seymour
Stuart, Mary	1542–1587	Mary Queen of Scotland	—	Mary of Scotland	—	—	Mary, queen of Scots
Talbot, Catherine	1721–1770	—	—	—	40. TALBOT	—	—
Thomas, Elizabeth	1675 – 1731	—	—	Corinna Thomas	—	—	Mrs. Thomas
Piozzi, Hester Thrale	1740–1821	—	—	—	—	14. "gay PIOZZI"	—
Tishem, Catherine	1595 (death)	Catherine Tisthem	—	"Catherine Tishen, a Great Linguist"	—	—	Catherine Tishem
Fielding, Elizabeth	1694–1754	—	—	—	29. "charming TOLLETT" (l. 266)	—	Elizabeth Tollet
Tudor, Elizabeth	1533–1603	Queen Elizabeth	—	Queen Elizabeth	03. Eliza	—	Elizabeth, queen of England
Tudor, Mary	1516–1558	Queen Mary	—	"Queen Mary, daughter of Henry VIII"	—	—	—
Vane, Frances Anne	1715–1788	—	09. Vane	—	—	—	—
Walker, Elizabeth	1623–1690	Elizabeth Walker	—	Elizabeth Walker	—	—	—
Weston, Elizabeth Jane	1581–1612	Elizabeth Jane Weston	—	Elizabeth Jane Weston	—	—	Elizabeth Jane Weston
Wharton, Anne	1659–1685	Anne Wharton	—	Anna Wharton	—	—	Anne Wharton
Whateley, Mary	1738–1825	—	—	—	34. "Daughter of SHENSTONE" (l. 305)	—	—
Wheatley, Phillis	1753–1784	—	—	—	Phillis Wheateley	—	—
Williams, Anna	1706–1783	—	—	—	36. ANNA	—	—
Williams, Helen Maria Williams	1759–1827	—	—	—	—	05. HELEN	—
Wollstonecraft, Mary	1759–1797	—	—	—	—	01. Wollstonecraft	—
Wright, Mehetabel Wesley	1697–1750	—	13. WRIGHT	—	—	—	—
Wroth, Mary	1587–1653	—	—	Lady Mary Wroth	—	—	—
Yearsley, Ann	1753–1806	—	—	—	—	06. YEARSELEY	—

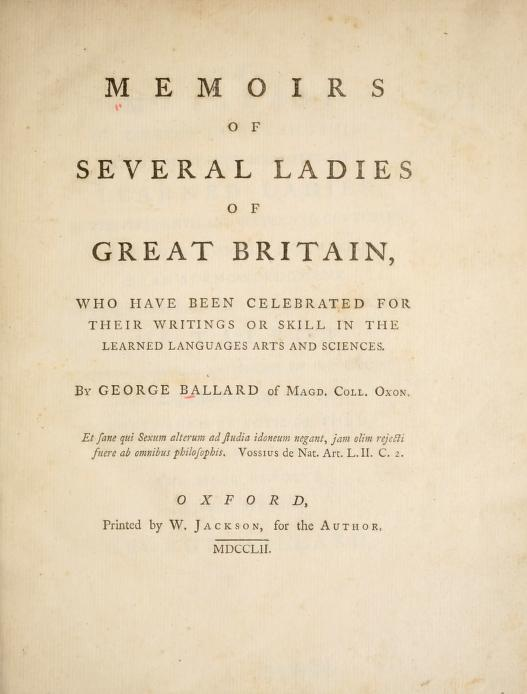
Title page of George Ballard's Memoirs of several ladies of Great Britain (Oxford, 1752)

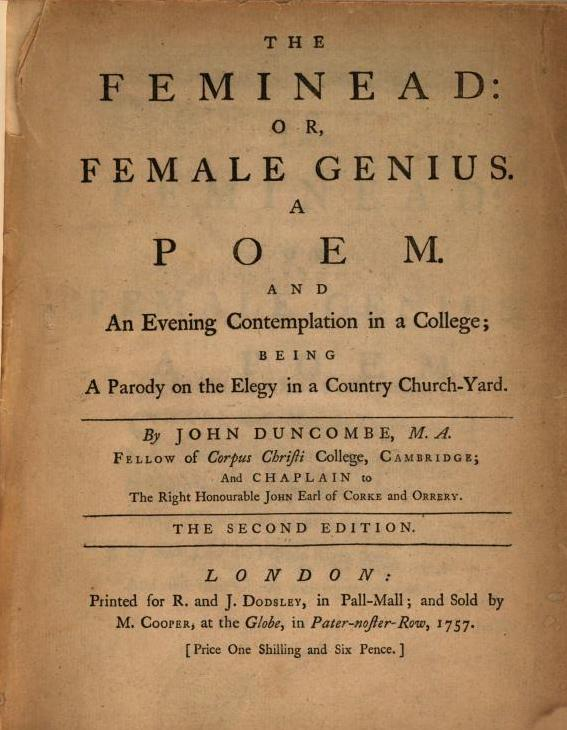
Title page of John Duncombe's The Feminead 2nd edition (London, 1754; rpt. 1757)

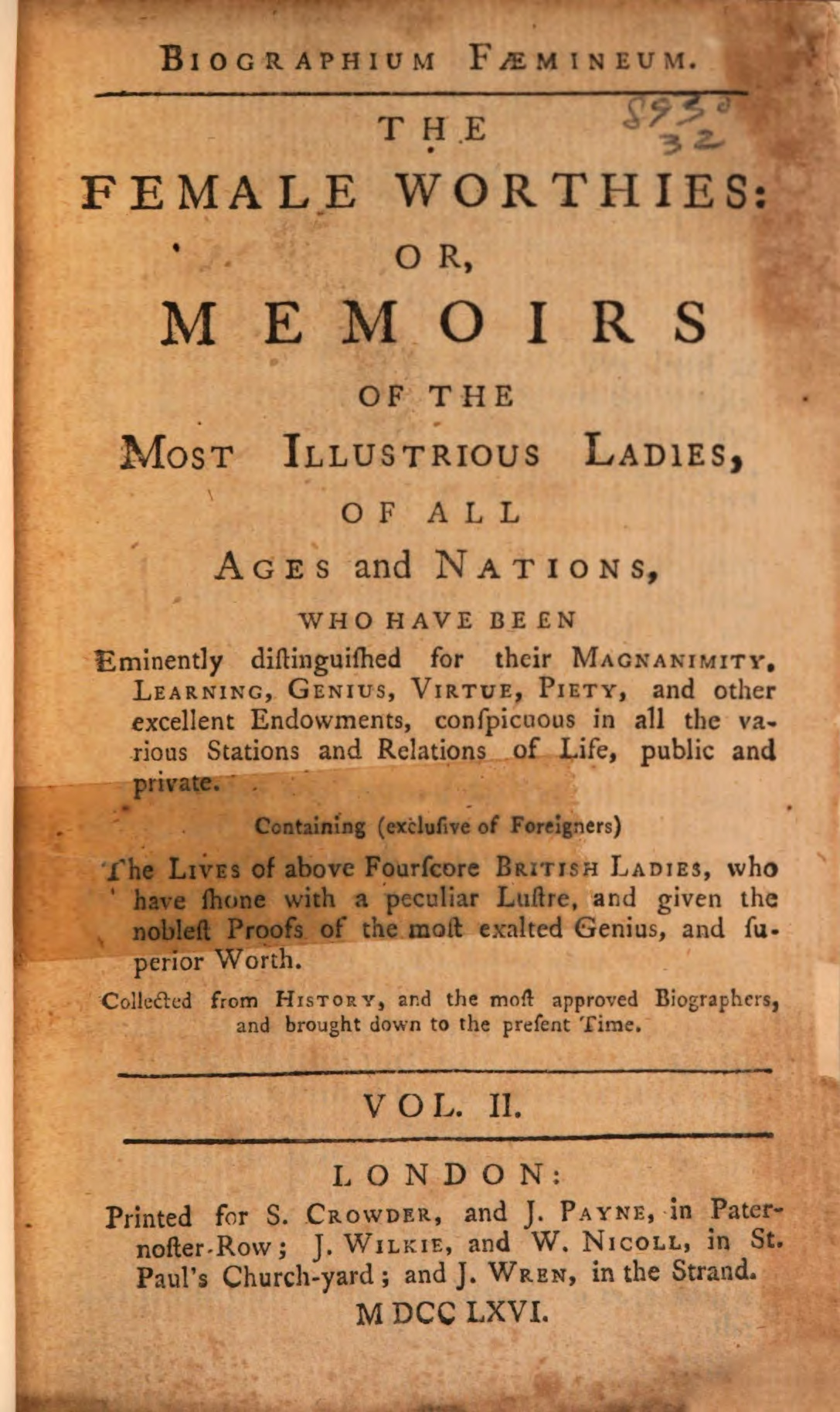
Title page of Biographium Faemineum Vol. II (Anon., London, 1766)

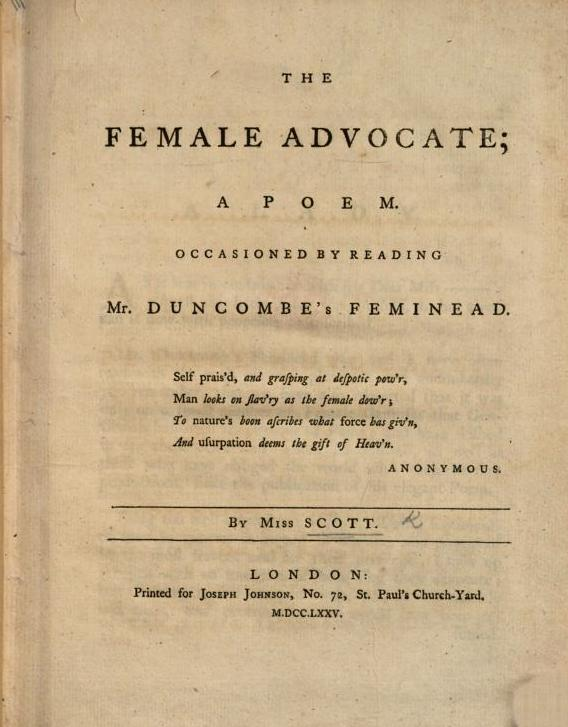
Title page from Mary Scott's The Female Advocate (London, 1775)

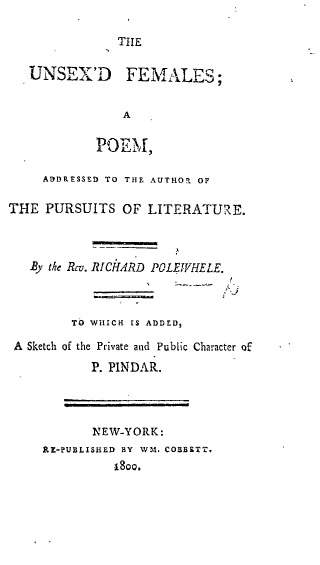
Title page of Richard Polwhele's The Unsex'd Females (London 1798; rpt. New York, 1800)

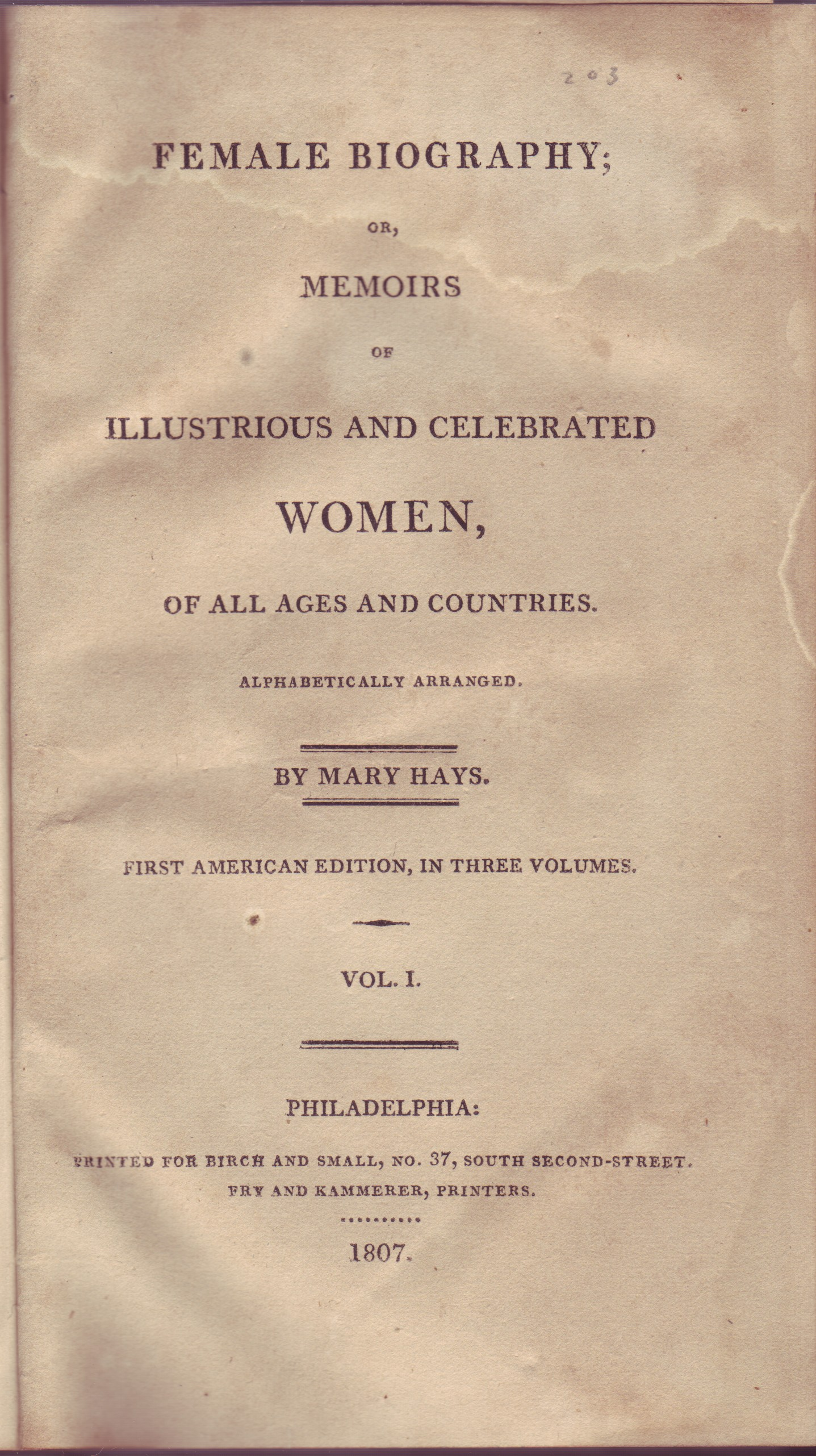
Title page of Mary Hays's Female Biography or, Memoirs of Illustrious and Celebrated Women (London 1803; rpt. Philadelphia, 1807)

== Texts ==
- Anon (1766). Biographium faemineum: the female worthies, or, Memoirs of the most illustrious ladies, of all ages and nations, who have been eminently distinguished for their magnanimity, learning, genius, virtue, piety, and other excellent endowments. London: S. Crowder.. Vol. II is available online at HathiTrust.
- Ballard, George (1752). Memoirs of several ladies of Great Britain, who have been celebrated for their writings, or skill in the learned languages, arts and sciences. Oxford: W. Jackson. hdl:2027/njp.32101071964751.
- Duncombe, John (1757). The Feminead. Or, female genius. A poem. London: M. Cooper.
- Hays, Mary (1803). Female Biography, or Memoirs of Illustrious and Celebrated Women of All Ages and Countries. London: R. Phillips.
- Polwhele, Richard (1798). The Unsex'd Females: a poem, addressed to the author of the Pursuits of Literature. London: Cadell and Davies.
- Scott, Mary (1775). The Female Advocate; a poem occasioned by reading Mr. Duncombe's Feminead. London: Joseph Johnson.

== See also ==
- Biography
- List of biographical dictionaries of women writers in English
- Women's writing (literary category)
- Wikisource: Biographical dictionaries
