= George Ballard (biographer) =

English antiquary and biographer

George Ballard (c. 1706 – June 1755) was an English antiquary and biographer, the author of Memoirs of Several Ladies of Great Britain (1752).

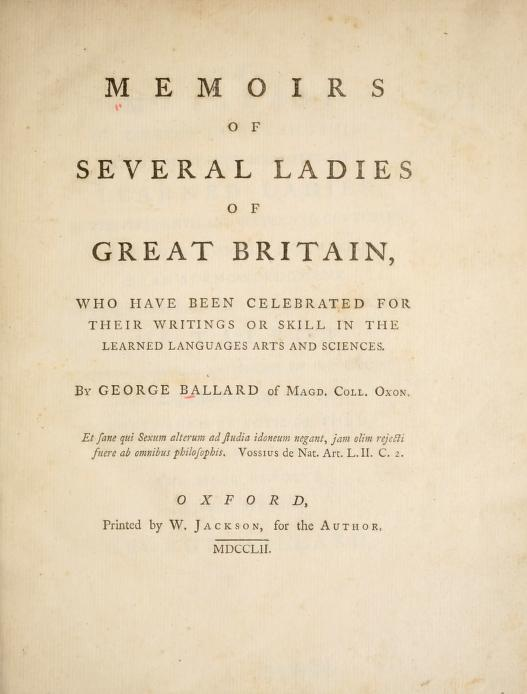
Title page of George Ballard's Memoirs of several ladies of Great Britain (Oxford, 1752)

== Life ==
Ballard was born at Chipping Campden, Gloucestershire. Self-educated, Ballard taught himself Anglo-Saxon while working in a habit-maker's shop, and attracted the attention of the Saxon scholar Elizabeth Elstob. Lord Chedworth and other local gentlemen provided him with an annuity of £60 a year, enabling Ballard to move to Oxford to use the Bodleian Library. Dr. Jenner appointed him a clerk of Magdalen College, Oxford, and he subsequently became a university beadle.

Ballard died young, and his only printed publication was Memoirs of several ladies of Great Britain, who have been celebrated for their writings, or skill in the learned languages, arts and sciences (Oxford: W. Jackson, 1752). This quarto volume was published by subscription, and dedicated to Sarah Talbot of Kineton, the wife of the clergyman William Talbot of Kineton who had helped him receive patronage as a young man, and Mary Delany. The first woman treated by Ballard's Memoirs is Julian of Norwich; the last is Constantia Grierson (1704/5–1732).

Ballard left a large manuscript collection, and his substantial correspondence, to the Bodleian.

== Subjects of Memoirs of Several Ladies of Great Britain ==
In the Memoirs, Ballard arranged his sixty-five essays chronologically. This list is alphabetical, and names have been modernized to reflect current practices.

- Catherine of Aragon (1485–1536), queen consort
- Margaret Ascham (née Harleston; then Howe; c. 1528 – c. 1592), writer and editor
- Anne Askew (later Kyme; 1521–1546), poet and preacher
- Mary Astell (1666–1731), writer and philosopher
- Ann Bacon (née Cooke; 1528–1610), writer and scholar
- Mary Basset (née Roper; also Clarke; c. 1523 – 1572), translator and classicist
- Ann Baynard (1672–1697), natural philosopher
- Margaret Beaufort (1443–1509), politician and patron
- Juliana Berners (b. 1388), writer and nun
- Elizabeth Bland (fl. 1681 – 1712), Hebraist
- Catherina Boevey (née Riches; 1669–1726), philanthropist
- Elizabeth Burnet (née Blake; 1661–1709), philanthropist and religious writer
- Elizabeth Bury (née Lawrence; 1644–1720), diarist
- Elizabeth Cavendish (1626–1663), writer
- Margaret Cavendish (née Lucas; c. 1624-1674), writer and philosopher
- Katherine Chidley (fl. 1616–1653), Puritan activist and Leveller
- Mary Chudleigh (née Lee; 1656–1710), poet and intellectual
- Margaret Clement (née Giggs; 1508–1570), scholar
- Anne Clifford (1590–1676), autobiographer and patron
- Elizabeth Clinton (née Knyvet(t); c. 1570–1638), noblewoman and writer
- Mildred Cooke (1526–1689), scholar and translator
- Elizabeth Dauncey (née More; 1506–1564), daughter of Thomas More
- Eleanor Davies (1590–1652), prophet
- Elizabeth Fane (d. 1568), writer and literary patron
- Anne Finch (1661–1720), poet
- Mary FitzAlan (1540–1557), translator
- Grace Gethin (née Norton; 1676–1697), essayist
- Jane Grey (1537–1554), scholar
- Constantia Grierson (née Crawley; c. 1705-1732), classicist, editor, and poet
- Anne Halkett (née Murray; c. 1623 – 1699), religious writer and autobiographer
- Cecily Heron (née More; born 1507–?), Latinist and daughter of Thomas More
- Susanna Hopton (née Harvey; 1627–1709), religious writer
- Jane Howard (1537–1593), noblewoman
- Esther Inglis (née Langlois; 1570/71-1624), calligrapher and miniaturist
- Margery Kempe (c. 1373 - c. 1440), pilgrim and writer
- Anne Killigrew (1660–1685), poet and painter
- Catherine Killigrew (c. 1530-1583), gentlewoman and scholar
- Elizabeth Legge (1580–1685), linguist & poet
- Elizabeth Lucar (née Withypoll; 1510–1537), calligrapher
- Jane Lumley (née Fitzalan; 1537–1578), classicist
- Damaris Cudworth Masham (1658–1708), philosopher theologian
- Mary Monck (née Molesworth; 1677? – 1715), poet
- Dudleya North (1675–1712), orientalist, linguist, and classical scholar
- Frances Norton (née Freke; 1640–1731), writer
- Julian of Norwich (1343–1443), anchorite and writer
- Dorothy Pakington (née Coventry; 1623–1679), religious writer
- Catherine Parr (1512–1548), queen consort
- Blanche Parry (1508-1589), antiquary
- Katherine Philips (née Fowler; (1631/2 – 1664), poet
- Margaret Roper (née More; 1505–1544), scholar, translator, and daughter of Thomas More
- Margaret Rowlett (née Cooke; d. 1558), sister of Ann Bacon, Mildred Cooke, Elizabeth Russell
- Elizabeth Russell (née Cooke; 1528–1609), gentlewoman and poet
- Anne Seymour (later Dudley; 1538–1588), poet
- Jane Seymour (1541–1561), poet
- Margaret Seymour (b. 1540), poet
- Mary Sidney (later Herbert; 1561–1621), poet
- Arbella Stuart (later Seymour; 1575–1615), noblewoman
- Mary Stuart (1542–1587), Queen of Scotland
- Catherine Tishem (died 1595), classical scholar
- Elizabeth Tudor (1533–1603), Queen of England and Ireland
- Mary Tudor (1516–1558), Queen of England and Ireland
- Elizabeth Walker (née Sadler; 1623–1690), diarist and pharmacist
- Elizabeth Jane Weston (bap. 1581?, d. 1612), scholar & linguist
- Anne Wharton (née Lee; 1659–1685), poet and dramatist
