= Elizabeth Dauncey =

English courtier

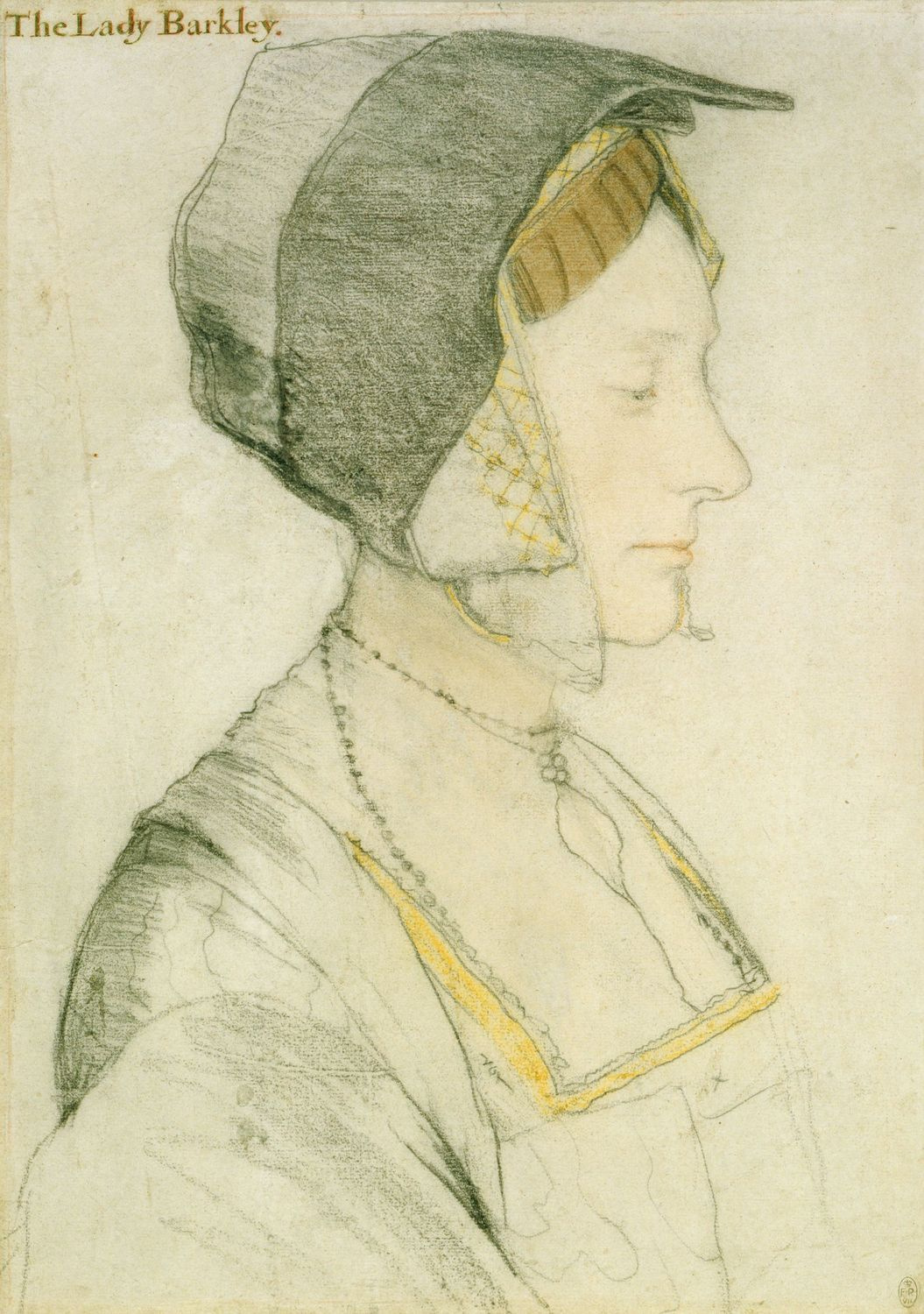
- Portrait study of Elizabeth Dauncey, 21 years, by Hans Holbein the Younger, c.1527
- Born: Elizabeth More; 1506; Bucklersbury, London St Stephen Walbrook parish
- Died: 1564 (aged 58)
- Spouse: William Dauncey
- Parents: Thomas More (father); Jane Colte (mother)
- Relatives: Margaret Roper (sister); Cecily Heron (sister)

Elizabeth Dauncey (née More; 1506–1564), one of Thomas More's daughters, was part of a circle of exceptionally educated and accomplished women who exemplified "learned ladies" for the next two centuries.

== Early life and education ==
Elizabeth More was the second child of Thomas More and his first wife, Jane Colte (1488–1511). Margaret (later Roper; 1505–1544) was the eldest; Cecily (later Heron; 1507-?) and John (1509–1547) were younger. Shortly after the death of his first wife, Thomas More married Alice Middleton and the family expanded to include her daughter Alice (1501–1563), as well as two young women whom Thomas More adopted: Margaret Giggs (who eventually married John Clement, a sometime tutor to the family) and Anne Cresacre (1511–1577; Cresacre eventually married Elizabeth's brother John). Elizabeth and her siblings were educated in the humanist tradition by More, their tutor, William Gunnell, and a series of notable intellectuals within Thomas More's orbit such as Nicholas Kratzer (1487? – 1550). The More household was a lively intellectual hub of activity, "a model of humanistic interests" and a "magnet" for Erasmus. "She was educated in the learned languages, and most of the sciences, by ... great masters ... in which she was a very great proficient," according to biographer George Ballard. "She corresponded with Erasmus, who applauds her for her pure Latin style, and genteel way of writing."

Eighteenth-century poet Mary Scott wrote that the three More sisters "were all women of great talents and learning." Thomas More insisted upon giving his daughters the same classical education as his son, an unusual attitude at the time. He wrote that girls were "equally suited for those studies by which reason is cultivated and becomes fruitful like a ploughed land on which the seed of good lessons has been sown." And Margaret More, in particular, is considered to have been one of the most learned women in sixteenth-century England. Thomas More's humanistic ideas about the education of girls did not oppose existing ideas about gender roles, however, as he still felt that women should remain within the private sphere.

Elizabeth married William Dauncey, son of Sir John Dauncey, Privy Councillor and Knight of the Body to Henry VIII, on 29 September 1525.

Elizabeth and William had seven children: John (b.1525), Thomas, Bartholomew, William, Germain, Alice, and Elizabeth. They lived at Canons Park, Middlesex, and in London, then (after 1543) at Cassiobury, Hertfordshire.

In 1543, her husband, brother, and their relative John Heywood (c. 1497 – c. 1580) were implicated in the Prebendaries' Plot, an attempt to oust Thomas Cranmer from the office of archbishop of Canterbury. They were later pardoned.

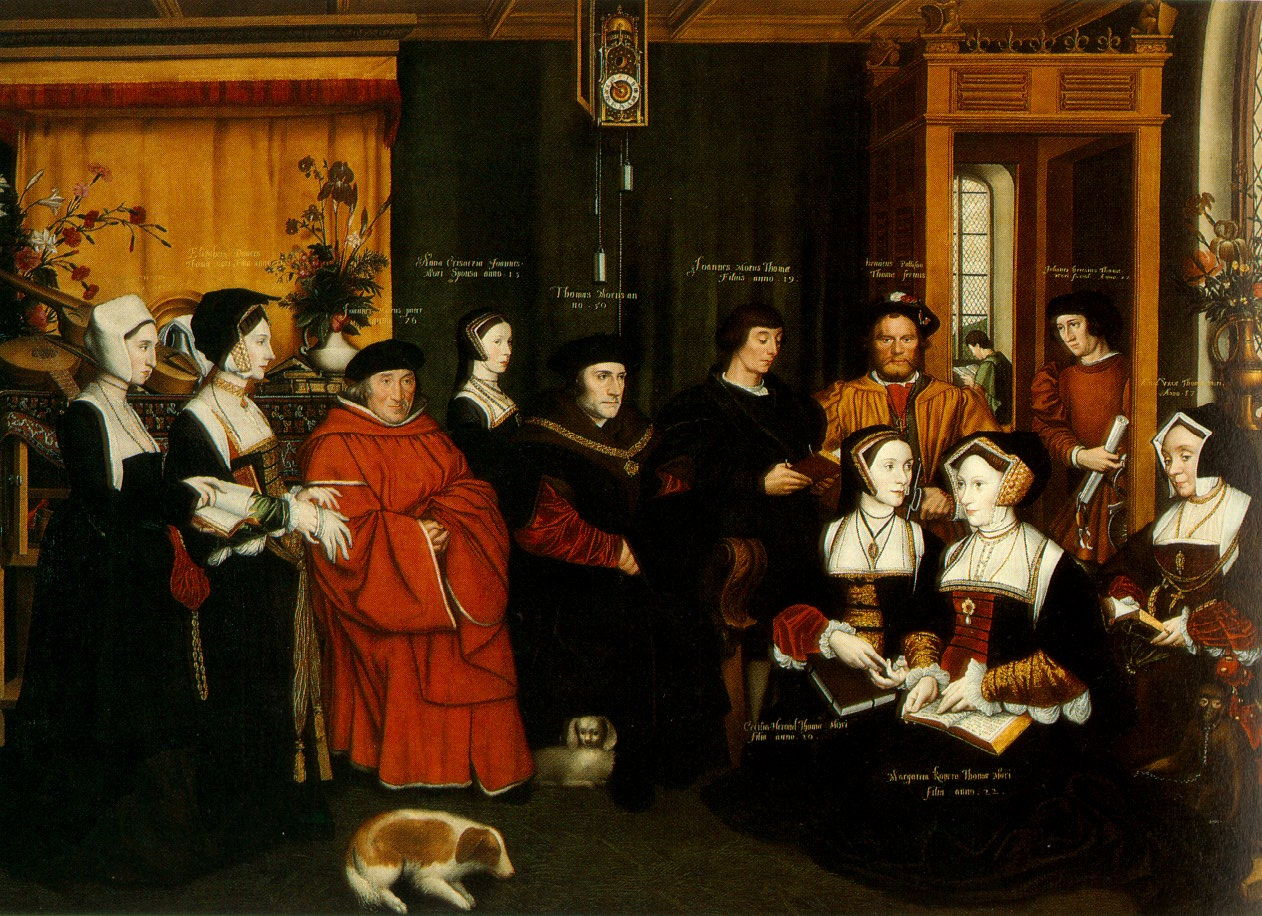
Rowland Lockey (1565–1616), after Hans Holbein the Younger, Thomas More and his family (1592)

== Legacy ==
A family portrait by Hans Holbein the Younger, Sir Thomas More and Family (c. 1527), was destroyed in a fire in 1752, though Rowland Lockey (1565–1616) had been commissioned to paint one of several copies in 1592. In Lockey's painting we see the embodiment of More's vision of the family as humanistic intellectual hub. Studies by Holbein for the larger portrait still exist, including one of Elizabeth Dauncey.

Dauncey and her sisters are included in George Ballard's Memoirs of several ladies of Great Britain (1752), and Mary Hays's Female Biography, or Memoirs of Illustrious and Celebrated Women of All Ages and Countries (1803). Mary Scott, in her laudatory poem The Female Advocate (1775), collectively described the women of the More, Seymour, and Cooke families as "a bright assemblage."

== See also ==
- Collective 18th-century biographies of literary women
- List of women in Female Biography
