= Margaret Clement (prior) =

English prioress

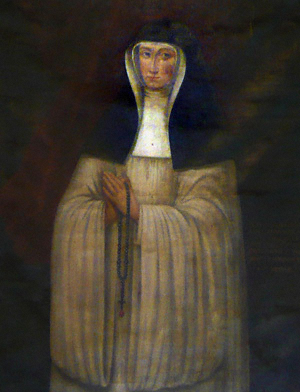
- Born: 1539; Kingdom of England
- Died: 20 May 1612 (aged 72–73); Leuven

Margaret Clement (1539 – 20 May 1612) was an English prioress of St Ursula's convent in Leuven.

== Life ==
Margaret Clement was born in England. Her Catholic parents were the physician John Clement who died in 1572 and Margaret Clement, the adopted daughter of Thomas More. Her father taught Greek and Latin and both her parents taught her. In 1549 the family went into exile during the reign of the protestant Edward VI, and in 1551, Margaret and her sister Helen were sent to school, the school chosen being one attached to the Flemish Augustinian convent in Leuven known as St Ursula's. The school may have been chosen because Elizabeth Woodford had been a nun there since 1548. Elizabeth had been a nun in England and had stayed with her father after her English convent was suppressed in 1549.

In 1554 Margaret Clement's family moved back to England and while there, Margaret told them of her desire to become a nun. Her parents supported her request and paid for her to join Syon Abbey, but their daughter was set upon entering St Ursula's. Her parents stayed only six years in England before returning to exile in Mechelen after the accession of Elizabeth I.

Margaret Clement was later to head St Ursula's convent. In the canonical ballot, she was elected by only one vote. However, there was an impediment to her taking charge, since Tridentine legislation required Prioresses to be more than forty years old. In the event, the nun who had come second in the ballot was ten years older than Margaret and could perhaps have been given the post, but the Bishop of Louvain instead supported Margaret's election. St Ursula's was a Flemish monastery but the house attracted many English women who wanted to become nuns. Between 1569 and 1606, 28 women escaping persecution in the then Protestant England entered the convent and this was generally considered to be owing to Margaret's being in charge.

== Death and legacy ==
In 1606 Clement retired and the new elected prioress was Flemish. A group of six nuns, unhappy that their candidate, Mary Wiseman, had not been elected, decided to establish an English house. Elizabeth Shirley was chosen as the person who would organise the new house.

Clement died in Leuven in 1612.

In 1616 or 1626 Elizabeth Shirley wrote what is now thought to be the first biography of a woman, by a woman in English. She chose to record Clement's life and how she led St Ursula's convent in Leuven.
