= Cecily Heron =

English courtier

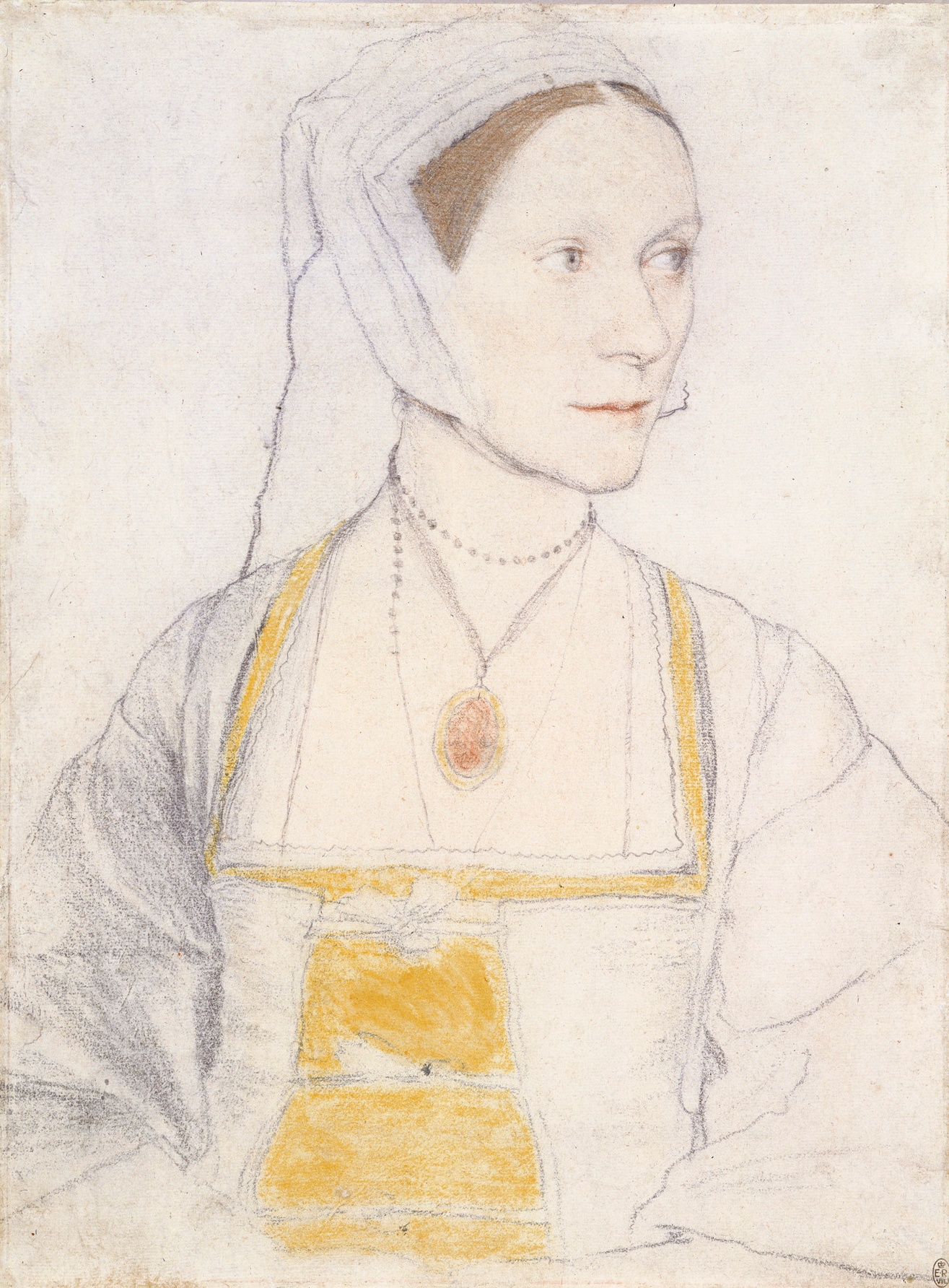
- Portrait study of Cecily Heron at 20-years-old, pregnant with her first child, drawn by Hans Holbein the Younger, c.1527
- Born: Cecily More; 1507; Bucklersbury, London St Stephen Walbrook parish
- Spouse: Giles Heron
- Father: Thomas More
- Relatives: Margaret Roper (sister); Elizabeth Dauncey (sister)

Cecily Heron (née More; 1507–?), one of Thomas More's children, was part of a circle of exceptionally educated and accomplished women who exemplified "learned ladies" for the next two centuries.

== Early life and education ==
Cecily More was the third child of Thomas More and his first wife, Jane Colte (1488-1511). Margaret (later Roper; 1505–1544) was the eldest; followed by Elizabeth (later Dauncey; 1506–1564), Cecily, and then John (1509-1547). Shortly after the death of his first wife, Thomas More married Alice Middleton and the family expanded to include her daughter Alice (1501-1563), as well as two young women whom Thomas More adopted: Margaret Giggs (who eventually married John Clement, a sometime tutor to the family) and Anne Cresacre (1511–1577; Cresacre eventually married Thomas More's son John). Cecily and her siblings were educated in the humanist tradition by More, their tutor, William Gunnell, and a series of notable intellectuals within Thomas More's orbit such as Nicholas Kratzer (1487? – 1550). The More household was a lively intellectual hub of activity, "a model of humanistic interests" and a "magnet" for Erasmus. "She was educated in almost all kinds of learning in her father's house," according to biographer George Ballard. "She was a perfect mistress of the Latin tongue."

Eighteenth-century poet Mary Scott wrote that the three More sisters "were all women of great talents and learning." Thomas More insisted upon giving his daughters the same classical education as his son, an unusual attitude at the time. He wrote that girls were "equally suited for those studies by which reason is cultivated and becomes fruitful like a ploughed land on which the seed of good lessons has been sown." And Margaret More, in particular, is considered to have been one of the most learned women in sixteenth-century England. Thomas More's humanistic ideas about the education of girls did not oppose existing ideas about gender roles, however, as he still felt that women should remain within the private sphere.

Cecily married Giles Heron (by 1504 – August 1540), a former ward of her father's, in 1525. The couple had two sons and a daughter. Heron was a landowner and Member of Parliament for Thetford but politics under the Tudors were precarious and he was hanged for treason in 1540. Their eldest son, Thomas, was eventually able to reclaim part of the estate. Not much else is known of the latter part of Cecily Heron's life.

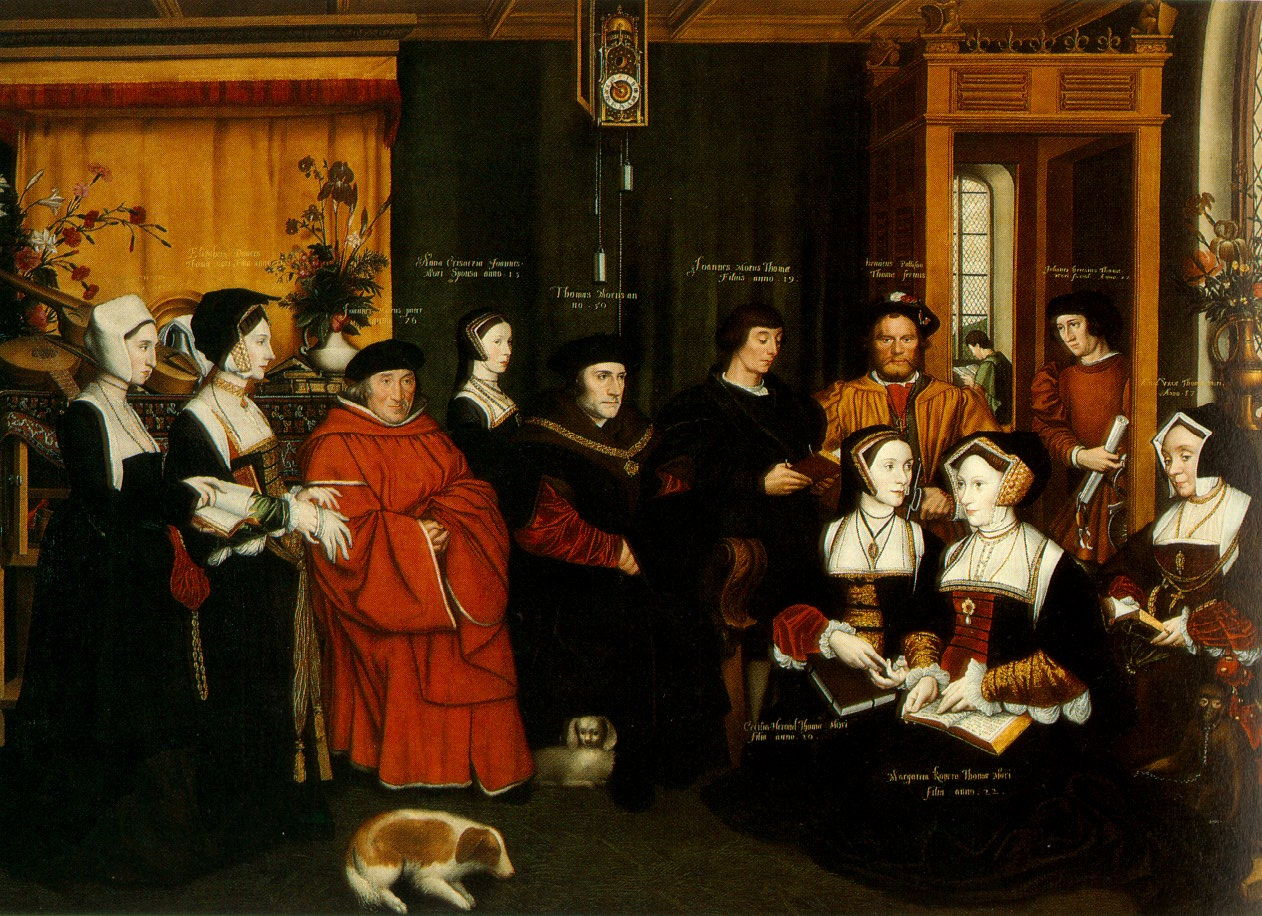
Rowland Lockey (1565–1616), after Hans Holbein the Younger, Thomas More and his family (1592)

== Legacy ==
A family portrait by Hans Holbein the Younger, Sir Thomas More and Family (c. 1527), was destroyed in a fire in 1752, though Rowland Lockey (1565–1616) had been commissioned to paint one of several copies, in 1592. In Lockey's painting we see the embodiment of More's vision of the family as humanistic intellectual hub. Studies by Holbein for the larger portrait still exist, including one of Cecily Heron, drawn when she was pregnant. The piece was on display in 2020 at the London Foundling Museum in an exhibition entitled "Portraying Pregnancy: From Holbein to Social Media": "When Holbein drew Cecily Heron, Thomas More’s third and youngest daughter, during her first pregnancy in 1527, the fitted bodice of her square-necked gown, loosened to accommodate her bulging stomach, told its own story."

Cecily and her sisters are included in George Ballard's Memoirs of several ladies of Great Britain (1752), and Mary Hays's Female Biography, or Memoirs of Illustrious and Celebrated Women of All Ages and Countries (1803). Mary Scott, in her laudatory poem The Female Advocate (1775), collectively described the women of the More, Seymour, and Cooke families as "a bright assemblage."

== See also ==
- Collective 18th-century biographies of literary women
- List of women in Female Biography
