= William Rastell =

16th-century English printer and judge

William Rastell (1508 – 27 August 1565) was an English printer and judge.

== Life ==
Rastell was born in London, a son of John Rastell and his wife Elizabeth More, sister of Sir Thomas More. At the age of seventeen he went to the University of Oxford, but did not take a degree, being probably called home to superintend the printing business of his father.

He was MP for Hindon in October 1553 and for Ripon in April 1554 and for Canterbury in 1555.

His office was in Fleet Street in St Bride's churchyard. He became a student at Lincoln's Inn on 12 September 1532, and gave up the printing business two years later. In 1547 he was appointed Reader. On account of his Catholic convictions he left England for Leuven; but upon the accession of Mary he returned, and was made Sergeant-at-law and Treasurer of Lincoln's Inn in 1555. His patent as judge of the Queen's Bench was granted on 27 October 1558. Rastell continued on the bench until 1562, when he retired to Leuven without the queen's licence. By virtue of a special commission issued by the barons of the Exchequer on the occasion an inventory of his goods and chattels was taken. This inventory furnishes an idea of the modest nature of the law library (consisting of twenty-four works) and of the chambers of an Elizabethan judge.

Rastell died in Leuven, Duchy of Brabant in 1565.

== Works ==
The first work which bears Rastell's own imprint was A Dyaloge of Sir Thomas More (1531), a reprint of the edition published by his father in 1529. He also brought out a few law-books, some poetry, an edition of Fabyans Cronycle (1533), and The Apologye (1533) and The Supplycacyon of Soulys of his uncle Sir Thomas More.

== Family ==
Rastell's wife was Winifred, daughter of Margaret Giggs Clement, who was the foster daughter of Sir Thomas More, and John Clement, who was tutor to Sir Thomas More's children.
