= Elizabeth Shirley =

English Augustinian nun and author

- Born: 1564
- Died: 1 September 1641 (aged 76–77); Leuven
- Occupation: Nun

Elizabeth Shirley (1564 – 1 September 1641) was an English Augustinian nun and author. Born in England she died in Leuven at a convent she had helped create. She may have written the first biography of a woman, by a woman, in English.

== Life ==
Shirley was born in 1564, probably in Leicestershire. She was one of eight children of Sir John Shirley. She went to live in Staunton Harold in Leicestershire to look after her unmarried brother, Sir George Shirley. George was a Catholic and he tried to convert his sister to his faith. At first, she resisted but was later persuaded by stories, books and her vision of the Holy Ghost.

Her brother eventually married and Elizabeth was no longer required at Staunton Harold. Her options included getting married or becoming a nun. She opted to become a nun although at the time, owing to government persecution in England, the convents were all located abroad. She joined the monastery of Augustinian canonesses at Leuven known as St Ursula's and there made profession on 10 September 1596. This was a Flemish monastery but it was headed by Margaret Clement, an Englishwoman, whose presence attracted many English women wanting to become nuns. Between 1569 and 1606, 28 women escaping persecution in England had joined the house. In 1606 Margaret Clement retired and the nun who succeeded her as prioress was Flemish. A group of six nuns, unhappy that their candidate, Jane Wiseman's daughter, Mary Wiseman, had not been elected, decided to leave and found an English house. The new house was also established in Leuven and it was named St Monica's. This was Shirley's creation as she had been elected to be take charge of the financial aspects of the foundation. She governed the new house, established on 10 February 1609, for its first nine months. In the November another nun was elected prioress and Elizabeth Shirley received the role of sub-prioress.

In 1616 or 1626 she wrote what is now thought to be the first biography of a woman, by a woman in English. She chose to record the life of Margaret Clement who had led St Ursula's convent in Leuven.

Shirley resigned as sub-prioress in 1637 and later died at St Monica's, where she was also buried.
