= Giles Heron =

16th-century English politician

Giles Heron (by 1504 – August 1540) was an English politician.

== Life ==
He was born in Hackney, Middlesex the son of the wealthy landowner and courtier Sir John Heron. While he was a minor, his father died in 1521 and Heron came under the wardship of Sir Thomas More. He later married Sir Thomas's daughter, Cecily, with whom he had two sons and a daughter.

He was educated at Cambridge University and in 1529 he became Member of Parliament for Thetford. In 1532 he was appointed to the bodyguard of Henry VIII and same year he and three of his brothers were pardoned of offences against forestry laws. In 1536 he sat on the Middlesex grand jury which found a true bill against Anne Boleyn. He inherited much of his father's wealth, and enjoyed a comfortable life as a landowner.

However a dispute with a tenant led to his eventual downfall, as he was accused and found guilty of treason. He was hanged at Tyburn in 1540. In 1554, during the reign of Queen Mary, part of his lands were repatriated to his eldest son, Thomas, with the help of Sir Ralph Sadler.
