= Elizabeth Legge =

- Born: 1580
- Died: 1685 (aged 104–105)
- Occupation: Writer
- Parent(s): Edward Legge; Mary Walsh
- Family: William Legge

Elizabeth Legge (1580 – 1685) was a learned Englishwoman and alleged centenarian during the Elizabethan era.

She was born in 1580, the eldest daughter of Edward Legge and Mary Walsh. Edward Legge was the father of William Legge and grandfather of George Legge, 1st Baron Dartmouth.

Elizabeth Legge appears in George Ballard's biographical work Memoirs of Several Ladies of Great Britain (1752). According to Ballard's account, Legge knew at least five languages and wrote poetry. Her practice of reading and writing by candlelight apparently led to the eventual loss of her eyesight. She died unmarried at the age of 105. Biographies of Legge appear in a number of other biographical works, likely based on Ballard's original, including Biographium Femineum (1766) and Mary Hay's Female Biography (1803).
