= Thomas Edwards (orientalist) =

Thomas Edwards (1652–1721) was a Welsh divine and orientalist.

== Life ==
Edwards was born at Llanllechid, near Bangor, Carnarvonshire, in 1652. He was educated at St John's College, Cambridge, where he took the two degrees in arts, the B.A. in 1673, and the M.A. in 1677. In the early part of his life he lived with Dr Edmund Castell, and in 1685 he was engaged by Dr John Fell, dean of Christ Church and bishop of Oxford, to assist in the impression of the New Testament in Coptic, almost finished by Dr Thomas Marshall. At the same time he became chaplain of Christ Church. He was presented to the rectory of Aldwinckle All Saints, Northamptonshire, in 1707, and died in 1721.

== Works ==
Edwards left a Coptic lexicon ready for the press. He also published:

- A Discourse against Extemporary Prayer, 8vo, London, 1703. Edmund Calamy referred to this book in support of his charge of apostasy against Theophilus Dorrington (Defence of Moderate Nonconformity, 1703, pt. i. p. 257).
- Diocesan Episcopacy proved from Holy Scripture; with a letter to Mr. Edmund Calamy in the room of a dedicatory epistle, 8vo, London, 1705. (Edwards' reply to Calamy)
