= John Heron (courtier) =

English courtier

Sir John Heron (1470 – 1522) was an English courtier. He was born in Hackney, Middlesex.

He came to prominence as Treasurer of the Chamber under Henry VII and Henry VIII between 1492 and 1521. He was also Chamberlain of the Exchequer from 1495 to 1522.

Heron was involved in financing the English army at the battle of Flodden in 1513. and in 1520 was in charge of the financial arrangements for the Field of the Cloth of Gold, a huge diplomatic initiative to celebrate peace between England and France.

His son, Sir Giles Heron, entered Parliament in 1529 when he married Cecily, the daughter of Sir Thomas More. He was later executed for treason in 1540.
