= John Jones (martyr) =

Welsh Franciscan friar and Catholic martyr (c. 1530 – 1598)

Saint John Jones O.F.M
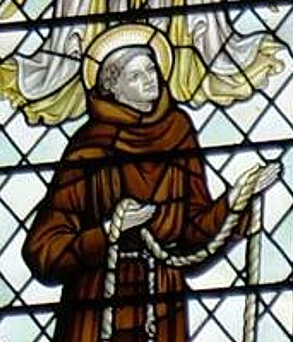
- A detail from a stained glass depiction of Franciscan Saints above the high altar at the former Chilworth Friary of the Holy Ghost

Martyr
- Born: c. 1530; Clynnog Fawr, Wales
- Died: 12 July 1598; Southwark, England
- Venerated in: Roman Catholic Church
- Beatified: 15 December 1929 by Pope Pius XI
- Canonized: 25 October 1970 by Pope Paul VI
- Major shrine: Pontoise
- Feast: 12 July, 25 October (with the Forty Martyrs of England and Wales)
- Attributes: rope, Franciscan habit, martyr's palm

John Jones O.F.M (c. 1530 - 12 July 1598), also known as John Buckley, John Griffith, Godfrey Maurice (in religion), or Griffith Jones, was a Franciscan priest and martyr. He was born at Clynnog Fawr, Caernarfonshire (Gwynedd), Wales, and was executed 12 July 1598 at Southwark, England. He is one of the Forty Martyrs of England and Wales.

== Life ==
John Jones was born at Clynnog Fawr, Caernarfonshire (Gwynedd), Wales. He came from a recusant Welsh family, who had remained faithful Roman Catholics throughout the Protestant Reformation. He was ordained a diocesan priest and was imprisoned in the Marshalsea under the name Robert Buckley from 1582 to about 1585 for administering the sacraments. By summer 1586 he was out on bond, but in 1587 confined at Wisbech Castle.

He left England, either escaped or exiled, in 1590 and at the age of sixty joined the Conventual Franciscans at Pontoise. Afterwards he went to Rome, where he lived among the Observant Friars of the Ara Coeli. After a time he was sent back by his superiors to the English mission; and before leaving Rome he had an audience of Pope Clement VIII who embraced him and gave him his blessing.

Jones reached London about the end of 1592, and stayed temporarily at the house which John Gerard, had provided for missionary priests, which house was managed by Anne Line. Jones ministered to Catholics in the English countryside until his arrest in 1596.

In 1596 the 'priest catcher' Richard Topcliffe was informed by a spy that Jones had visited two Catholics and had said Mass in their home. It was later shown that the two Catholics were actually in prison when the alleged offense took place. Regardless, Jones was arrested, severely tortured and scourged. Topcliffe then took Jones to his house where he was further tortured, "To him (Topcliffe) was granted the privilege, unique in the laws of England, or, perhaps, of any country, of maintaining a private rack in his own home for the more convenient examination of prisoners."

Following his torture, Jones was imprisoned for nearly two years. During this time Jones helped sustain John Rigby in his faith, who later also became one of the Forty Martyrs of England and Wales. His own leg injury was healed by Jane Wiseman, who was also a prisoner, in December 1595. On 3 July 1598 Jones was tried on the charge of "going over the seas in the first year of Her majesty's reign (1558) and there being made a priest by the authority from Rome and then returning to England contrary to statute". He was convicted of high treason and sentenced to be hanged, drawn and quartered.

A not entirely unsympathetic account of the executions of John Bodey and John Slade in 1583 was written by someone with the initials "R.B.". Historian John Hungerford Pollen suggests that it was written by a Catholic and further suggests that "R.B" could be Robert Barnes, who was convicted and hung fifteen years later for harboring John Jones. Also arrested for allegedly sheltering priests was Mrs. Jane Wiseman, who had two sons who were Jesuits. Like Margaret Clitherow, Wiseman refused to enter a plea and was therefore condemned to the peine forte et dure, although she was eventually pardoned.

=== Execution ===
As by this time the people had grown tired of these butcheries, the execution was arranged for an early hour in the morning. The place was St. Thomas's Watering, a small bridge over the Neckinger crossing the Old Kent Road, at the site of the junction of the old Roman road to London with the main line of Watling Street. This marked the boundary of the City of London's authority; it was also a place of gibbets. The execution was delayed by about an hour because the hangman forgot to bring a rope. Jones used the time to preach to the people and answer their questions. When the time came to draw away the cart, the hangman whipped the horses; but they were held back by three or four fellows till Jones had finished what he was saying.

John Jones' dismembered remains were fixed atop poles on roads leading to Newington and Lambeth (now represented by Tabard Street and Lambeth Road respectively). His remains were later reputedly removed by at least two Catholic Englishmen, one of whom suffered a long imprisonment for this offense. One of the relics eventually reached Pontoise, where Jones had taken his religious vows.

== Veneration ==
John Jones was named Venerable by Pope Leo XIII and beatified in 1929 by Pope Pius XI with a feast day of 12 July. He was canonized on 25 October 1970 by Pope Paul VI as one of the Forty Martyrs of England and Wales, who are commemorated on that date.
