= Theophilus Dorrington =

Theophilus Dorrington (1654–1715) was a Church of England clergyman. Initially a nonconforming minister, he settled at Wittersham in The Weald, an area with many Dissenters, particularly Baptists. He became a controversialist attacking nonconformity. He also warned that the Grand Tour could create Catholic converts, by aesthetic impressions.

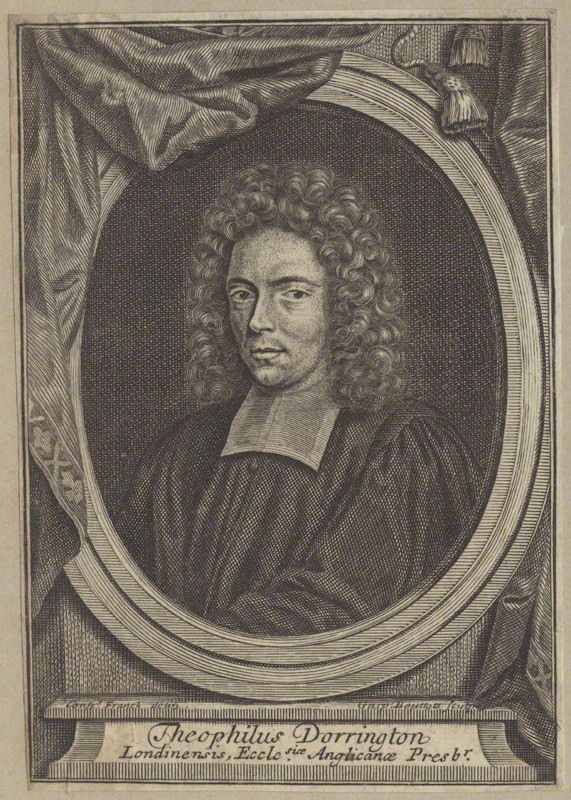
Theophilus Dorrington, 1703 engraving by Gaspar Bouttats

== Life ==
The son of nonconformist parents, Dorrington was educated for the ministry. In 1678 he ran, with three other young nonconformist ministers (Thomas Goodwin, the younger, James Lambert and John Shower), evening lectures at a coffee-house in Exchange Alley, London, which attended by merchants in the City of London. On 13 June 1680 he entered himself as a medical student at Leiden University.

John Williams, the bishop of Chichester, encouraged Dorrington to take be ordained in the Church of England. In 1698 he travelled in Holland and Germany, and in 1699 published an account of his journeys. In November 1698 he was presented by Archbishop Thomas Tenison to the rectory of Wittersham, in Kent. He was awarded a Master of Arts degree at Magdalen College, Oxford on 9 March 1710.

Dorrington died on 30 April 1715 at Wittersham.

== Works ==
Dorrington was a prolific author and controversialist. His publications included:

- The Right Use of an Estate: A Sermon (on 1 Cor. vii. 31), London, 1683.
- Reform'd Devotions London, 1687 (fourth edition, reviewed, London, 1696; sixth edition, London, 1704; ninth edition, London, 1727). These were based on the writings of the Catholic layman John Austin. It contained versions of medieval hymns, among others Lauda Sion, Vexilla Regis, and Veni Sancte Spiritus. Mark Noble wrongly ascribed to Dorrington the authorship of Devotions in the Ancient Way of Offices. … Reformed by a Person of Quality, and published by George Hickes, D.D. London, 1701. Another derivative work from Austin, it was by Susanna Hopton. Both these works printed variants of hymns by Samuel Crossman and Richard Baxter.
- The Excellent Woman described by her True Characters and their opposites [dedication signed T. D.], 2 pts., London, 1692–5. This was a translation of L'Honneste femme (1665) of Jacques du Bosc.
- Family Devotions for Sunday Evenings 4 vols. London, 1693–5 (third edition, revised, 4 vols. London, 1703).
- A Familiar Guide to the Right and Profitable Receiving of the Lord's Supper, London, 1695 (seventh edition, London, 1718; a French version was published, London, 1699).
- The Honour Due to the Civil Magistrate, 1796. A High Church polemic. The subtitle Stated and Urg'd in a Sermon Compos'd for the Day of Thanksgiving for the happy Discovery of the late Horrid and Excrable Conspiracy against His Majesties Sacred and Person and Government refers to the Jacobite assassination plot 1696.
- Observations concerning the Present State of Religion in the Romish Church, with some reflections upon them made in a journey through some provinces of Germany in the year 1698; as also an account of what seemed most remarkable in those countries, London, 1699.
- A Vindication of the Christian Church in the Baptizing of Infants, drawn from the Holy Scriptures, London, 1701. It was answered in 1705 in A Discourse of Baptism, by P. B., "a minister of the church of England".
- The Dissenting Ministry in Religion censured and condemned from the Holy Scriptures, London, 1703. This attack on former colleagues drew a reply from Edmund Calamy, in a postscript at the end of part i. of his Defence of Moderate Nonconformity, 1703 (pp. 239–61). Calamy charged Dorrington with apostasy, referring to the Discourse against Extemporary Prayer (1703) of Thomas Edwards.
- A Discourse on Singing in the Worship of God, London, 1704.
- Family Instruction for the Church of England, offer'd in several practical discourses, London, 1705.
- The Regulations of Play proposed and recommended, in a Sermon [on Prov. x. 23], London, 1706 (another edition appeared the same year).
- Devotions for Several Occasions, London, 1707.
- A Discourse [on Eph. vi. 18] on Praying by the Spirit in the use of Common Prayers, London, 1708.
- The Dissenters represented and condemned by themselves (anon.), London, 1710.
- The Worship of God recommended, in a Sermon [on Matt. iv. 10] preach'd before the University of Oxford … April 8th, 1711. With an Epistle in Defence of the Universities, Oxford, 1712.
- The True Foundation of Obedience and Submission to His Majesty King George stated and confirm'd, and the late Happy Revolution vindicated, London, 1714.
- The Plain Man's Preservative from the Error of the Anabaptists, showing the Professors of the Establish'd Religion how they may defend the Baptism they receiv'd in their Infancy against them. … Second edition, London 1729.

Dorrington translated from the Latin of Samuel Pufendorf The Divine Feudal Law, London, 1703, which is based on the late work Ius feciale divinum (1695); and a new edition under the variant title A View of the Principles of the Lutheran Churches, London, 1714, which had a second edition in the same year. The subtitle of the first work goes further than Pufendorf's original, and shows that Dorrington was in 1703 angling at the Hanoverian succession, in stressing unity between Anglicans and Lutherans. Some Jacobites took him to be proposing that the Lutheran church of Hanover should join the Church of England.
