= Catherine Tishem =

Catherine Thysmans alias Tishem (died 1595) was an erudite woman from Antwerp who educated her son, the celebrated scholar Jan Gruter, while in exile in England. She was the one woman in England under the bourgeoisie to be known as a classical scholar.

The principal source for Catherine Tishem's life is a worshipful tribute to her son, Jan Gruter, written by one of his pupils, Balthasar Venator. According to Venator, Tishem was a remarkably erudite woman, fluent in Latin, Greek, French, Italian, and English and able to read Galen's original text.

In 1558 in Antwerp, Tishem married a widowed and wealthy merchant and juror, Wouter Gruter (also "Walterus", "de Gruytere", etc.), originally from Breda. They had four children, Jan being born in December 1560. Her husband co-signed the Compromise of Nobles in 1566, and to flee prosecution in the Spanish Netherlands, they moved to the Dutch Calvinist exile community of Norwich. Some biographies of Jan Gruter claim that Tishem was originally from Norwich herself, though Thijsmans/Thysmans was a regular Flemish patronymic. When their son enrolled at the new Leiden University in Holland in 1578/1579, Catherine and Wouter returned to Antwerp, but the Siege of Antwerp in 1584 made them flee again, this time to Lübeck and then Gdańsk. Wouter Gruter died in Gdańsk in 1588, and, according to Peter Fuchs, Catherine died in 1595.
