= Elizabeth Walker (pharmacist) =

British druggist

Elizabeth Walker (12 July 1623 – 23 February 1690) was an English druggist known for her charity and piety. She kept a journal which was published and commented on posthumously by her husband, Anthony Walker, entitled, "The vertuous wife: or, the holy life of Mrs. Elizabeth Walker, late wife of A. Walker, D.D. sometime Rector of Fyfield in Essex: Giving a modest and short account of her exemplary piety and charity. Published for the glory of God, and provoking others to the like graces and vertues. With some useful papers and letters writ by her on several occasions."

== Early life ==
Elizabeth Walker (née Sadler) was born in Bucklersbury, London, on 12 July 1623. She was the eldest child of John and Elizabeth Sadler. Her father worked as a druggist in London and was quite successful selling tobacco products and other drugs. Elizabeth was born some five years into their marriage, at a time when they despaired of ever having children. This led to her parents being rather indulgent of her, and so she never wanted for much.

She claims that her mother trusted her more than her sisters, sending her places where the other children might get into trouble. At an early age Elizabeth recognized a certain level of piety and obedience, traits that would become some of her best-known characteristics as an adult.

These traits are exemplified in what Elizabeth's husband later called her "greatest fault [he] ever knew her guilty of". When Elizabeth was around fifteen, she got in trouble with a superior. Naturally her father was told, and when he confronted her about it, Elizabeth was so ashamed she denied the accusations. This lie would haunt her for the rest of her life, and her husband claims she never told another lie again.

Sometime during her young adult life, Elizabeth became depressed. She began to question her faith, and was overall discontent. Through a series of contacts and family friends Elizabeth was sent out to the country to live with John Beadle, an elderly minister. With time she was able to temporarily overcome her troubles. Unfortunately depression, or 'afflictions' as she called them, continued to trouble her throughout much of her life. Although her depression was not completely cured, Mr. Beadle would introduce her to her future husband, Anthony Walker. Shortly after her return from the country, Elizabeth and Anthony were married.

== Personal life ==
=== Marriage ===
Elizabeth was married to Anthony Walker on 23 July 1650, at the age of 27. While not overly old for marriage – most women in the early modern period married in their twenties – this is notably later than usual. Mr. Walker was a religious man, chaplain to the Earl of Warwick, and later the Rector of Fyfield.

Love appeared to be of most importance to her happy marriage, for in his commentary Anthony writes:

"She would often come into my Study to me, and when I have asked her what she would have, she would reply, Nothing, My Dear, but to ask thee how thou dost, and see if thou wantest any thing; and then with an endearing Smile would say, Dost thou love me? To which when I replied, Most dearly; I know it abundantly, would she answer, to my Comfort, but I love to hear thee tell me so."

Walker dutifully recorded every instance her husband fell ill, described the illness to the best of her ability, and wrote a few prayers alongside. His sickness was of perhaps great interest to her as a pharmacist – though she never hesitated to call in a doctor if need arose.

=== Children ===
Walker gave birth to her first child, a daughter, on 12 July 1651. Over the next 14 years she carried eleven pregnancies to full term. Of the six sons and five daughters, three were stillbirths – two boys and a girl – giving the Walkers eight children in total. Walker kept meticulous notes in her journal of each child's "merciful deliverance from God" and other details, such as her health around delivery.

"The twelfth of July, 1651, God mercifully Deliver'd me of my first Child. In 1652, I being big with-Child, had an high Fever, and was after a great and very hot fit delivered of a Daughter, Aug. 29. Being Lord's Day, between four and five in the Morning, my Fever turned to an Ague, and held me ten Weeks, and brought me very low, yet God in his Mercy graciously spared me, and restored my Health, I bless him for it."

As was tradition, Walker was the primary teacher for her children. She kept her children with her, and hired dancing, singing, and writing instructors to fill in what gaps she could not. She taught them to read herself, instructed them in prayer as soon as they could walk, and had them memorize scriptures when they could read on their own.

She gave special attention to the teachings of her daughters, addressing them specifically in her notes. She reminded them of the duties of a "virtuous woman": that they should work hard, help those in need, and obey their husbands. In her writings, Walker included pages worth of scripture and prayers she deemed noteworthy for her children. She often utilized her daughters as scribes, to transcribe her best recipes.

Despite her medical knowledge, most of her children did not make it to adulthood. In her journal, Walker described the death of two of her daughters, Mary, and Elizabeth.

Mary was six years old at the time of her death in 1669. Walker writes of her:

"My sweet Child, and dearly beloved Daughter Mary, a sweet tender hearted obedient Child, of great Prudence, and early Piety, and exemplary Inclination to the knowledge of God, and concerns of a better Life; she fell suddenly ill of a Sore Throat, Jan. 17. 1669. and after four Days illness, sweetly fell asleep in Jesus Christ, Jan. 21."

Some five or six years later tragedy again struck the Walker house when her daughter, also named Elizabeth, died of smallpox. She was sixteen.

Her only daughter to make it to marriage was Margaret, who gave birth to a son later the same year she married. The son lived; Margaret contracted a fever, and died shortly after.

Apart from the few mentioned in her book, it is difficult to know exactly when her other children died, but in her journal she writes, "Lord I bless thee that of Eleven, for whom I Praise thee, thou hast yet spared me two [...]". It can be surmised that one of those children was Margaret, and the other an unnamed son, however sources are unclear as to whether that son later died as well. It is entirely possible Walker witnessed the death of all eleven children.

== Work and charity ==
Walker was perhaps most well known as being a druggist like her father. Her afternoons were filled with helping sick neighbors, preparing medicines, and counseling the poor. She "[...] distilled Waters, Syrups, Oils, Ointments, Salves, &c. or distribute them out, or apply them to those who needed [...]" She sought out other recipes for medicines and treatments actively, often enlisting the help of her brother in law, a licensed physician. She was skilled as both a physician and a surgeon, and when she wasn't reading scripture, read and studied the works of doctors.

No mention is made of a license, so it is likely Walker was one of the many unlicensed medical practitioners of the time. That she chose to deal in drugs and medicines is mildly unusual – of the small number of women in the medical field at that time, most were midwives. Even the health of women wasn't entirely a women's field – men were uncomfortable with women practitioners in any part of the field, and they routinely tried to get laws passed that would prevent women from practicing.

Along with crafting medicines and helping others, Walker also had duties involving the running of her household. As well as teaching her children to read and write, she taught her own servants, and instructed them to follow in her pious ways. She was careful to maintain a balance, never being too harsh a mistress, but also never too liberal, never too frugal, or too lavish. Her days were kept as meticulous as her bookkeeping, rising early and praying until six in the morning, when she would begin the rest of her day. Her fragility as a child and depression as a young woman never left her, and she was often struck by ill health or depressive episodes.

=== Writings ===
"The vertuous wife: or, the holy life of Mrs. Elizabeth Walker" was a collaboration between Elizabeth and her husband, Anthony. She wrote the journal while she lived, and forbade her husband from reading it until she died. Upon her death, Anthony published her work and commented on it himself, often reflecting on their relationship. Her journal entries describe events such as the Great Plague of London in 1665, the Great Fire of London in 1666, and her own more personal accounts of her eleven pregnancies.

For the time, the publishing of any female writings, particularly diaries and memoirs, was still rather new, and Anthony Walker was unique in his long quotes and pages devoted to Walker's writings.

Apart from her journal, Walker is credited as a source for a "Receipt for the eyes" in a manuscript formerly owned by the Duke of Norfolk.

Walker may also have been consulted or included in a receipt book written by Mary Rich, Countess of Warwick, and her sister, Lady Katherine Ranelagh, though it is difficult to discern what she wrote or influenced.

== Death ==
In February 1690, Walker fell ill with a combination of pneumonia and erysipelas, a bacterial infection of the skin. After a few days the illness worsened, and on 23 February she died. Perhaps a true sign of her piety, some of the last words she spoke to her husband were, "A short Prayer my Dear before thou goest." She was buried on 27 February. Her death was followed by her husband's two years later, in 1692.

=== Legacy ===
It is unknown as to whether anyone continued with Walker's work after she died. Ideally, her daughters would have continued for her, but with all of them dead this wasn't an option. No mention was made of her ever taking on an apprentice, which was a common practice for the time. Walker's legacy carries on in her writings published by her husband, and those other receipt books she may have been a part of.

== See also ==
List of female scientists before the 21st century
