= Susanna Hopton =

Susanna Hopton née Harvey (1627–1709) was an English devotional writer.

== Life ==
Largely self-educated, she married Richard Hopton of Kington, Herefordshire, a barrister, and judge. In the early 1650s she became a Catholic convert through the influence of Father Henry Turberville.

Later Hopton's husband brought her back to the Church of England after theological study in William Laud, Thomas Morton, and William Chillingworth. There were no children of the marriage, and her husband died in 1696, leaving her in comfortable circumstances. She continued to live at Kington. Two close friends among the nonjuring clergy were George Hickes and Nathaniel Spinckes, both of whom published accounts of her life.

Before her last illness Hopton moved from Kington to Hereford, where she died of a fever on 12 July 1709, aged 81. She was buried at Bishops-Frome, near her husband.

== Works ==
Hopton's works were all of a devotional character, and were for the most part published anonymously. They drew on unpublished work of Thomas Traherne; Hopton may have known him, given that her niece Susanna Blount married Philip Traherne, and the Hoptons lived for some time at Gattertop, Hope under Dinmore, not far from Credenhill. They include:

- Daily Devotions, consisting of Thanksgiving, Confessions, and Prayers, by an Humble Penitent, 1673.
- Devotions in the Antient Way of Offices, 1701. It was published by George Hickes, who revised it and added a preface. He explained that the work had already had four editions in a Roman Catholic version (that of John Austin), and five as it was revised by Theophilus Dorrington, while this was the second in a new version. The work contains psalms, hymns, and prayers for every day in the week, and for every holy day in the year.
- A Hexameron, or Meditations on the Six Days of Creation. After each day's meditations there are verses on it of some poetical merit.
- Meditations and Devotions on the Life of Jesus Christ. The last two, together with the Daily Devotions, were published after her death in one volume by Nathaniel Spinckes, under the title of A Collection of Meditations and Devotions, in Three Parts, 1717.
- A Letter to Father Turberville was published posthumously by Hickes for Hopton in 1710, i.e. 49 years after it was written, in his second volume of Controversial Letters.

Hopton left poems in manuscript.

== Notes ==
Attribution

This article incorporates text from a publication now in the public domain: Lee, Sidney, ed. (1891). "Hopton, Susanna". Dictionary of National Biography. Vol. 27. London: Smith, Elder & Co.
