= Jane Wiseman (recusant) =

English recusant & priest harbourer (??–1610)

- Born: Jane Vaughan
- Died: 1610
- Known for: Recusancy, harbouring of Catholic priests
- Spouse: Thomas Wiseman
- Children: 8
- Parent(s): Cuthbert Vaughan and Elizabeth Raydon or Roydon

Jane Wiseman (née Vaughan; died 1610) was an English recusant and priest harbourer. She narrowly avoided becoming a Catholic martyr after being sentenced to Peine forte et dure. Her daughter Mary Wiseman (born Jane) was the founding prioress of St Monica's Convent of Augustinian canonesses regular in Leuven (Louvain).

== Life ==
Her parents are said to be the soldier Cuthbert Vaughan who was the second of the three husbands of Elizabeth Raydon or Roydon. Her mother was said to be related to Tudor royalty. Her father died in the 1560s and her mother on 19 August 1595.

Jane was said to have had over thirty men who wanted to marry her before she settled on Thomas Wiseman. Their household, Braddocks, was known for allegiance to the Catholic religion.

When her husband died, her eldest son William inherited the property. She consulted John Gerard who became the family's chaplain in 1591 and with little persuasion she created a new household, Bullocks, complete with chaplain. Her son was to work with Gerard, asking him for help in proofreading some of his writing. Gerard would go on to become a Catholic hero.

Jane would become renowned for her obstinate recusancy towards the Protestant religion, which led to her being fined and losing properties in Debden and Wimbish. She attended an illegal mass at Braddocks in September 1592 and she was indicted in January 1593. The authorities knew that she had not only been harbouring priests but she had sent all four of her daughters abroad to become nuns. She was formally arrested on 12 January 1594, indicted at the Essex Assizes, and imprisoned in the London Gatehouse where she would spend the next two years. In order to secure sufficient evidence to convict her, Richard Topcliffe arranged for Jane to be entrapped through a minor Gatehouse official asking her to tend to the injuries of another prisoner; what Jane did not know was that this prisoner was, in fact, the Franciscan friar John Jones. For this, and for her earlier activities, she was charged with "receiving, comforting, helping and maintaining priests"; she refused to be tried by a jury, and thus to enter a plea. Jane was fully aware of the penalty of peine forte et dure, or being pressed to death, that was imposed on those who refused to plead but, reportedly being influenced by Margaret Clitherow's example, was prepared to become a martyr. On 30 June 1598, in line with peine forte et dure, Jane was sentenced to be stripped naked "except for a linen cloth about the lower part of her body", given "the worst bread and water of the prison next her" on alternating days (i.e. she could not drink on the day she ate nor could she eat on the day she drank), and pressed by "stones and iron" until she either entered a plea or died. While John Gerard reported that Jane left the court "rejoicing that she had not been thought unworthy to suffer for Jesus' sake the form of death she had hoped would be hers", the Chronicle of Saint Monica's Convent, Louvain states that her son William, upon hearing of the sentence, "by bribes [...] got one to speak a good word unto the Queen [Elizabeth I] in his mother's behalf", with the Queen being reported to have criticised the cruelty of Jane being sentenced to peine forte et dure "for so small a matter" and to have decreed that she should remain alive. In any event, Jane's sentence was indeed commuted to one of indefinite imprisonment and she would spend the next five years in prison, "deprived of all she possessed" according to John Gerard, before being released in 1603 following the accession of James I to the English throne and the subsequent pardoning of Catholic prisoners. She initially returned to her Bullocks residence and continued to harbour two Jesuit priests, before later moving to Louvain where, in the same Saint Monica's Convent that her daughter Mary was prioress of, she would die peacefully in 1610.

== Private life ==
Jane and Thomas had eight children whose names are known but their birth dates are not clear. William was born in the 1550s, Jane in about 1570, John in 1571, and Thomas in 1572. The others were Robert, Anne, Barbara and Bridget. All four daughters would become nuns, with Anna and Barbara joining the exiled Bridgettines in Portugal and Jane and Bridget joining the Canonesses of Saint Augustine in Louvain; Jane would later become prioress of the Saint Monica's convent in 1609, by which point she was now known under the religious name of Mary Wiseman. As for their sons, John and Thomas intended to become Jesuit priests but died before they could be ordained, while Robert fought against Protestant factions during the Eighty Years' War, leaving William to protect the family's religious and material interests back in England.
