= Margaret Clement =

English mathematician

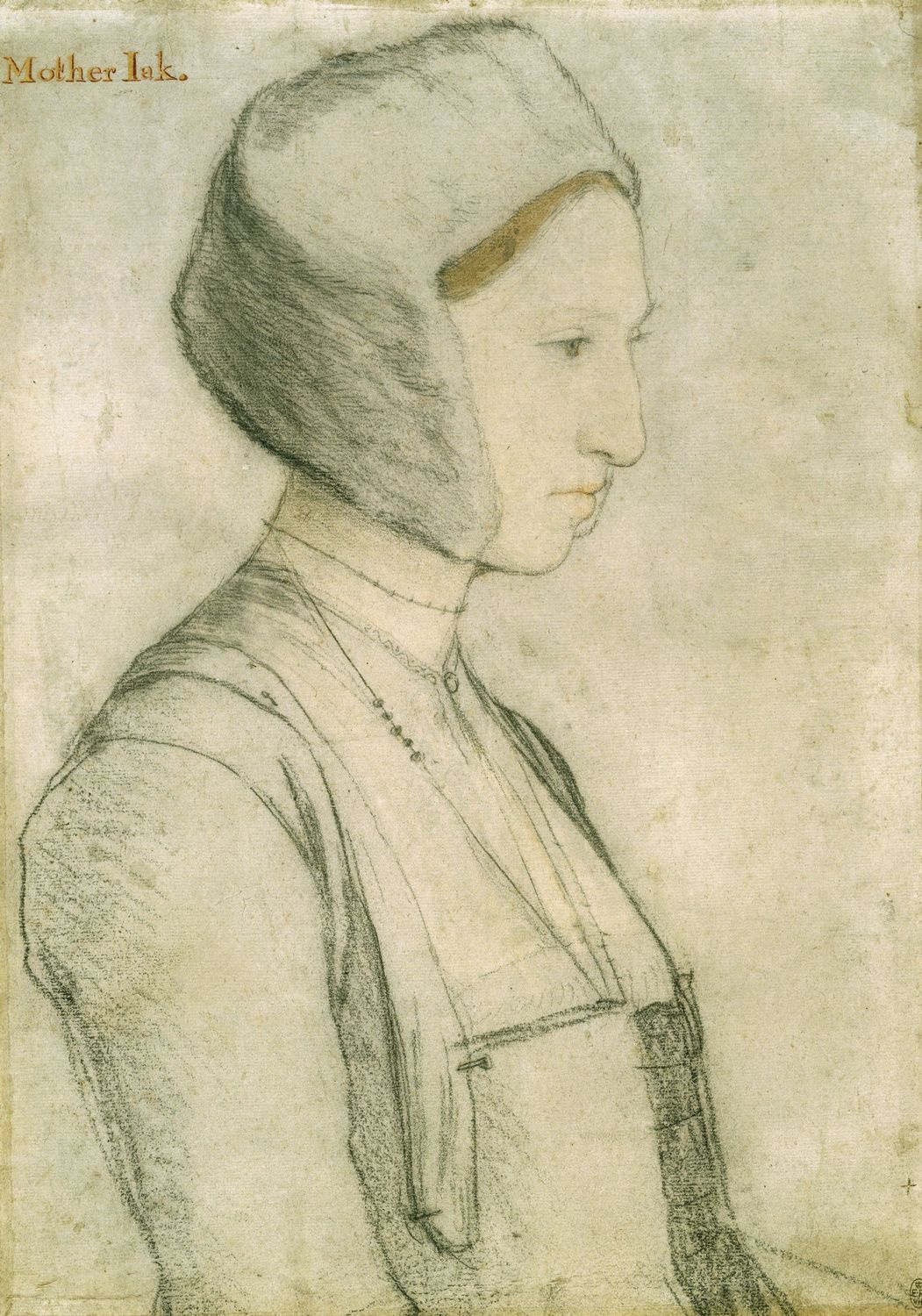
- Born: Margaret Giggs; 1508
- Died: 6 July 1570 (aged 61–62); Mechelen
- Spouse: John Clement (m. 1526)
- Children: 11, including: Winifred Clement Rastell; Thomas Clement; Dorothy Clement; Margaret Clement

Margaret Clement or Clements (1508–1570), née Giggs, was one of the most educated women of the Tudor era and the ward and, in effect, the adopted daughter of Sir Thomas More.

== Biography ==
Clement's maiden name was Giggs. She was born in 1508, the daughter of a gentleman of Norfolk. She became the ward of Sir Thomas More, who brought her up from childhood together with his own daughter, who was also named Margaret.

Algebra was probably her special study and More had an "algorisme stone" of hers with him in the Tower of London during his imprisonment, which he sent back to her the day before his execution in 1535. In devotion to her Catholic faith and to its adherents, she risked her life to aid the Carthusian Martyrs, monks starved to death in prison for refusal to renounce the Faith. She obtained the shirt in which Thomas More suffered and preserved it as a relic. Sir Thomas Elyot had conveyed to her and her husband the indignation felt by Emperor Charles V, Catherine of Aragon's nephew, at More's resignation, but William Roper, writing years later, had the emperor talking about More's execution; as R. W. Chambers points out, Elyot was not ambassador to the imperial court when More died.

== Education ==
The young Margaret received a humanist education from More, in spite of the frequent educational restrictions on girls still common in the English society of the day. She excelled in mathematics and medicine, yet was also educated in liberal studies such as philosophy and theology. As was noted by the Spanish scholar Juan Luis Vives, she also had an outstanding command of Greek.

While More himself provided extensive personal tutoring to Margaret, he also enlisted the help of numerous other scholars, including John Clement and Nicholas Kratzer.

== Personal life ==
In 1526, Giggs married her tutor in Ancient Greek, John Clement. She had eleven children between 1527 and 1540. Her eldest daughter, Winifred, married William Rastell, More's nephew, who became a judge. Another daughter, also called Margaret Clement, became the superior of a religious convent in Leuven. Her daughter Dorothy Clement likewise entered religious life. She had a son named Thomas, after Thomas More.

== Death ==
She remained a staunch Catholic, and died in exile on 6 July 1570 at Mechelen, in the Duchy of Brabant, part of the Habsburg Netherlands. Her husband outlived her by two years.

== See also ==
- Carthusian Martyrs
- English Reformation
- Henry VIII
- Forty Martyrs of England and Wales
