= John Clement (physician) =

John Clement (born in Yorkshire about 1500; died 1 July 1572, in the Blocstrate, St. John's parish, Mechlin, Duchy of Brabant) was an English Roman Catholic physician and humanist. He was tutor to Thomas More's children, and became President of the College of Physicians.

== Life ==
Clement was educated at St. Paul's School and Oxford. Thomas More admitted Clement as one of his household to help in the education of his children and to assist him in linguistic studies.

In 1521, Clement was at Corpus Christi College, Oxford, when Cardinal Thomas Wolsey constituted him the Rhetoric Reader in the university; later he became professor of Greek there. About 1526 he married the daughter of a Norfolk gentleman, Margaret Giggs, who lived and studied with More's family; she had been adopted by More.

Applying himself to the study of medicine, he was admitted a Fellow of the College of Physicians (1 February 1528), and was chosen by Henry VIII to attend Wolsey when the latter was dangerously ill at Esher (1529). He was consiliarius of the college from 1529 to 1531, in 1547, and again from 1556 to 1558. He held the office of president in 1544, and that of censor in 1555.

After the accession of Edward VI he retired to Louvain to escape persecution for his Catholicism; he was exempted from the general pardon granted by Edward. He returned to England in Mary Tudor's reign and practised his profession in Essex, but fled abroad again when Elizabeth I came to the throne.

Mechlin was his last place of exile. He lies buried in the cathedral church of St. Rumbold in that city.

== Works ==
He wrote: "Epigrammatum et aliorum carminum liber"; and also translated from Greek into Latin:

- (1) "The Epistles of St. Gregory Nazianzen";
- (2) "The Homilies of Nicephorus Callistus concerning the Greek Saints";
- (3) "The Epistles of Pope Celestine I to Cyril, Bishop of Alexandria".
