= List of early-modern British women poets =

This is an alphabetical list of female poets who were active in England and Wales, and the Kingdom of Great Britain and Ireland before approximately 1800. Nota bene: Authors of poetry are the focus of this list, though many of these writers worked in more than one genre.

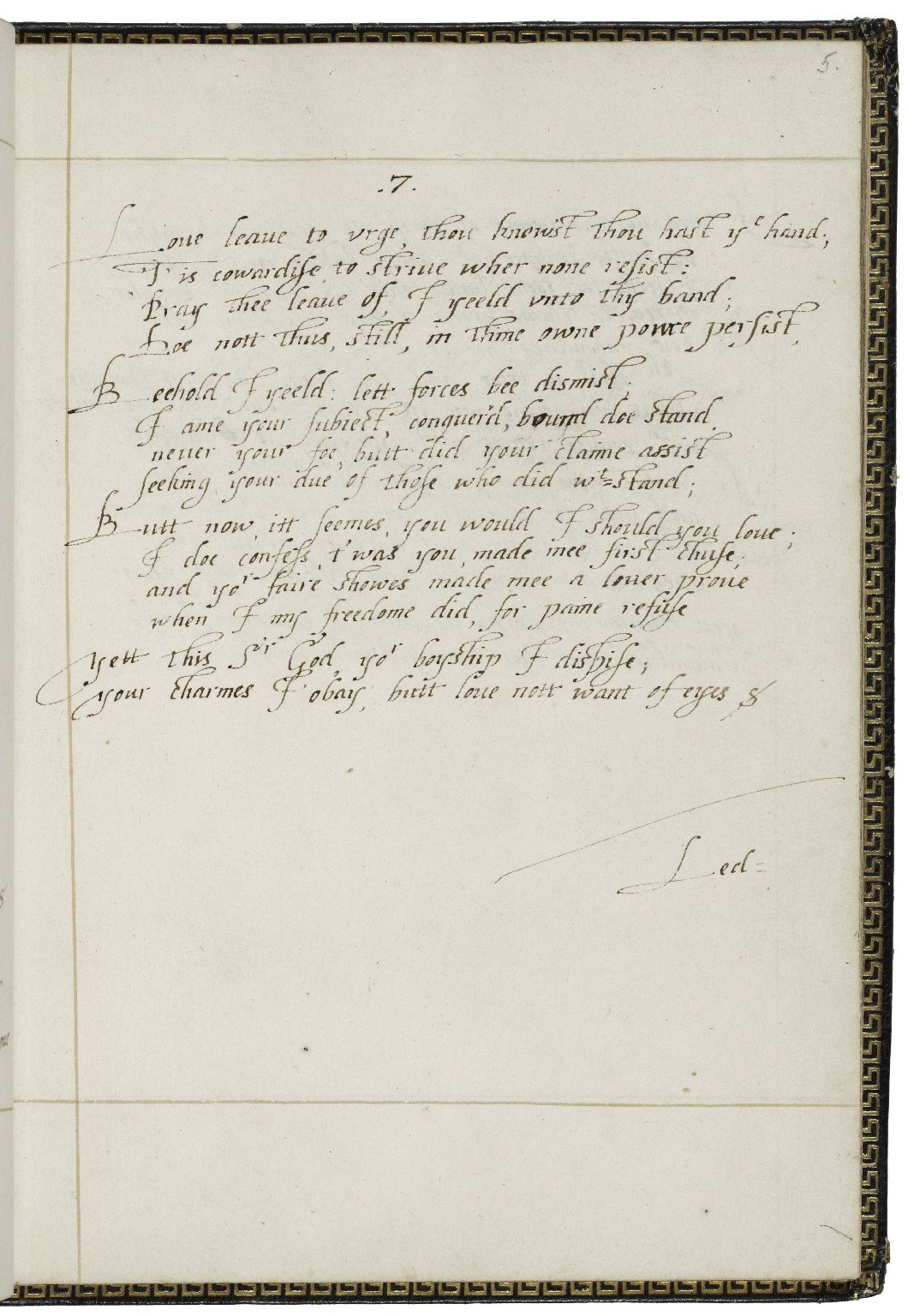
The seventh sonnet of Mary Wroth's Pamphilia to Amphilanthus, from a manuscript in Wroth's own hand, c. 1620

== Poets ==
=== A ===
- Eliza Acton (1799–1859)
- Jean Adam (1704–1765)
- Lucy Aikin (1781–1864)
- Mary Alcock (c. 1742 – 1798)
- Elizabeth Amherst (c. 1716–1779)
- Anne Askew (1521–1546)
- Mary Astell (1666–1731)
- Penelope Aubin (c. 1658 – 1731)
- Katherine Austen (1629 – c. 1683)

=== B ===
- Grizel Baillie (1665–1746)
- Joanna Baillie (1762–1851)
- Anne Bannerman (1765– 1829)
- Anna Laetitia Barbauld (1743–1825)
- Mary Barber (c. 1690 – 1757)
- Jane Barker (1652–1732)
- Anne Barnard (née Lindsay; 1750–1825)
- Maria Barrell (née Weylar; died 1803)
- Elizabeth Bath (fl. 1806)
- Henrietta Battier (c. 1751–1813)
- Aphra Behn (1640–1689)
- Benvenida Cohen Belmonte (fl. 1720)
- Elizabeth Benger (1775–1827)
- Elizabeth Bentley (1767–1839)
- Matilda Betham (1776–1852)
- Charlotte Beverley (fl. 1792)
- Margaret Bingham (1740–1814)
- Susanna Blamire (1747–1794)
- Annabella Blount (née Guise; fl. 1700–1741)
- Elizabeth Blower (c. 1757/1763 – after 1816)
- Frances Boothby (fl. 1669–1670)
- Jane Bowdler (1743–1784)
- Elizabeth Boyd (c. 1710 – 1745)
- Anne Bradstreet (c. 1612 – 1672)
- Barbarina Brand (1768–1854)
- Hannah Brand (1754 – 1821)
- Charlotte Brereton (b. c. 1720)
- Jane Brereton (1685–1740)
- Frances Brooke (1724–1789)
- Anne Bryton (fl. 1780)
- Frances Burney (1752–1840)
- Sophia Burrell (1753–1802)
- Phillipina Burton / Phillipina Hill (fl. 1768–1787)

=== C ===
- Mary Carey (née Jackson, later Peyler; c. 1609 – c. 1680)
- Rebekah Carmichael (later Hay; fl. 1790–1806)
- Christian Carstairs (fl. 1763–1786)
- Elizabeth Carter (1717–1806)
- Elizabeth Cary (née Tanfield; 1585–1639)
- Jane Cave (1754?–1812)
- Elizabeth Cavendish (1626–1663)
- Georgiana Cavendish (née Spencer; 1757–1806)
- Jane Cavendish (1620/21–1669)
- Margaret Cavendish (1623–1673)
- Dorothea Celesia (bap. 1738, d. 1790)
- Susannah Centlivre (1667–1723)
- Anna Chamber (d. 1777)
- Mary Chandler (1687–1745)
- Hester Chapone (1727–1801)
- Mary Chudleigh (1656–1710)
- Emily Frederick Clark (fl. 1798–1833)
- Elizabeth Cobbold (née Knipe; 1767–1824)
- Alison Cockburn (1713–1794)
- Mary Collier (c. 1688 – 1762)
- An Collins (fl. 1653)
- Elizabeth Cooke (Lady Russell, formerly Hoby; 1528–1609)
- Maria Susanna Cooper (1737–1807)
- Hannah Cowley (1743–1809)
- Frances Maria Cowper (née Madan; 1726–1797)
- Helen Craik (c. 1751 – 1825)
- Ann Batten Cristall (1769–1848)

=== D ===
- Charlotte Dacre (1782–1841)
- Alicia D'Anvers (1667–1725)
- Eleanor Davies (1590–1652)
- Mary Davys (1674–1732)
- Eliza Day (fl. 1734–1814)
- Maria De Fleury (fl. 1773–1791)
- Anne Dick (died 1741)
- Sarah Dixon (1671–1765)
- Katherine Doyley Dyer (d. 1654)
- Dorothea Dubois (née Annesley; 1724–1774)
- Anne Dutton (1692–1765)

=== E ===
- Elizabeth Egerton (1626–1663)
- Sarah Fyge Egerton (1670–1723)
- Jean Elliot (1727–1805)
- Elizabeth Elstob (1683–1756)
- Ephelia (fl. 1679)
- Mary Evelyn (1665–1685)

=== F ===
- Mary Fage (fl. 1637)
- Maria and Harriet Falconar (fl. 1788–1791)
- Catherine Maria Fanshawe (1765–1834)
- Sarah Farrell (fl. 1792)
- Anne Finch (1661–1720)
- Martha Fowke (1689–1736)
- Anne Francis (née Gittins) (1738–1800)
- Elizabeth Freke (1641–1714)
- Caroline Fry (1787–1846)

=== G ===
- Jean Glover (1758–1801)
- Janet Graham (1723–1805)
- Catherine Gray, Lady Manners (1766–1852)
- Frances Greville (c. 1727 – 1789)
- Jane Grey (1537–1554)
- Constantia Grierson (c. 1705 – 1732)
- Ann Griffiths (née Thomas, 1776–1805)
- Elizabeth Grimston (c. 1563 – c. 1603)

=== H ===
- Anne Halkett (1623–1699)
- Elizabeth Hamilton (1756 or 1758 – 23 July 1816)
- Elizabeth Hands (1746–1815)
- Susannah Harrison (1752–1784)
- Margaret Harvey (1768–1858)
- Lucy Hastings (1613–1679)
- Susanna Hawkins (1787–1868)
- Mary Hays (1759–1843)
- Eliza Haywood (1693–1756)
- Felicia Hemans (1793–1835)
- Mary Heron (fl. 1786–1792)
- Susanna Highmore (1689/90–1750)
- Margaret Holford (1757–1834)
- Margaret Holford (1778–1852)
- Anne Hughes (fl. 1784–1790)
- Anna Hume (fl. 1644)
- Anne Hunter (1742–1821)
- Lucy Hutchinson (1620–1681)

=== I ===
- Anne Ingram (c. 1696 – 1764)

=== J ===
- Anna Brownell Jameson (1794–1860)
- Catherine Jemmat (née Yeo; 1714–1766)
- Mary Jones (1707–1778)

=== K ===
- Isabella Kelly (c. 1759 – 1857)
- Anne Killigrew (1660–1685)
- Sophia King (later Fortnum; born c. 1781)
- Henrietta Knight (Baroness Luxborough; née St John; 1699–1756)

=== L ===
- Caroline Lamb (1785–1828)
- Mary Lamb (1764–1847)
- Laetitia Elizabeth Landon (1802–1838)
- Aemilia Lanier (1569–1645)
- Mary Latter (1725–1777)
- Mary Leapor (1722–1746)
- Helen Leigh (fl. 1788)
- Charlotte Lennox (1720–1804)
- Mrs Letches (fl. 1792)
- Esther Lewis (1716–1794)
- Anne Ley (née Norman; c. 1599 – 1641)
- Anne Lindsay (1750–1825)
- Mary Linskill (1840–1891)
- Janet Little (1759–1813)
- Mary Locke (later Mary Mister, 1768–1816)
- Maria Logan (fl. 1793)
- Agnes Lyon (1762–1840)

=== M ===
- Judith Madan (1702–1781)
- Bathsua Makin (1600 – c. 1675)
- Delarivier Manley (1663 or c. 1670 – 1724)
- Mary Masters (1694?–1759?)
- Elizabeth Melville, Lady Culross (fl. 1598–1631)
- Mary Russell Mitford (1787–1855)
- Mary Mollineux (née Southworth; c. 1651 – 1696)
- Mary Monck (née Molesworth; 1677? – 1715)
- Mary Wortley Montagu (c. 1689 – 1762)
- Elizabeth Moody (1737–1814)
- Jane Elizabeth Moore (born 1738)
- Hannah More (1745–1833)
- Arabella Moreton (after 1690 – 1727)
- Sydney Owenson Morgan (1783–1859)
- Celia Moss Levetus (1819–1873)
- Martha Moulsworth (née Dorsett; 1577 – c. 1646)
- Ann Murry (1750 – after 1818)

=== N ===
- Frances Norton (née Freke; 1644–1731)
- Manuela Nuñez de Almeida

=== O ===
- Margaret Ogle (fl. 1742)
- Adelaide O'Keeffe (1776–1865)
- Carolina Oliphant (Lady Nairne; 1766–1845)
- Henrietta O'Neill (1758–1793)
- Amelia Opie (1769–1853)
- Mary Oxlie (fl. 1616)

=== P ===
- Catherine Parr (c. 1512 – 1548)
- Elizabeth Pennington (1732–1759)
- Anne Penny (née Hughes; 1729–1784)
- Katherine Philips (1631–1664)
- Amelia Pickering (fl. 1788)
- Sarah Piers (1697–1714)
- Laetitia Pilkington (c. 1708 – 1750)
- Hester Lynch Piozzi (1740–1821)
- Mary Pix (1666–1709)
- Annabella Plumptre (1769–1838)
- Anne Plumptre (1760–1818)
- Priscilla Pointon (later Pickering; c. 1740 – 1801)
- Anna Maria Porter (1780–1832)
- Diana Primrose (fl. 1630)
- Hester Pulter (1605–1678)
- Jael Pye (née Mendez) (c. 1737 – 1782)

=== R ===
- Ann Radcliffe (1764–1823)
- Clara Reeve (1729–1807)
- Henrietta Rhodes (fl. 1811–1814)
- Catherine Eliza Richardson (née Scott; 1777–1853)
- Elizabeth Richardson (1576/77–1651)
- Maria Banks Riddell (née Woodley; 1772–1808)
- Eliza Roberts (fl. 1780–1788)
- Rose Roberts (1730–1788)
- Mary Robinson (1757–1800)
- Elizabeth Rolt (fl. 1768)
- Elizabeth Singer Rowe (née Singer; 1674–1737)
- Hannah Rowe (fl. 1785)
- Susanna Rowson (née Haswell; 1762–1824)
- Elizabeth Ryves (1750–1797)

=== S ===
- Maria Grace Saffery (1773–1858)
- Charlotte Sanders/Charlotte Saunders (fl. 1787–1803)
- Mary Savage (fl. 1763–1777)
- Anna Sawyer (fl. 1794–1801)
- Mary Scott (1752–1793)
- Anna Seward (1742–1809)
- Frances Seymour(née Thynne; 1699–1754)
- Elizabeth Sara Sheppard (1830–1862)
- Elizabeth Ann Sheridan (1754–1792)
- Mary Sidney Herbert (1561–1621)
- Charlotte Smith (1749–1806)
- Elizabeth Smith (1776–1806)
- Joanna Southcott (1750–1814)
- Rachel Speght (b. c. 1597)
- Mariana Starke (c. 1762 – 1838)
- Anne Steele (1717–1778)
- Mary Stockdale (1774–1854)
- Agnes Strickland (1796–1874)
- Elizabeth Stuart, Queen of Bohemia (1596–1660)
- Helen D'Arcy Stewart (née Cranstoun; 1765–1838)

=== T ===
- Catherine Talbot (1721–1770)
- Ann Taylor (1782–1866)
- Elizabeth Taylor (d. 1708)
- Ellen Taylor (fl. 1792)
- Emily Taylor (1795–1872)
- Jane Taylor (1783–1824)
- Elizabeth Teft (b. 1723)
- Ann Thomas (fl. 1784—1795)
- Elizabeth Thomas (1675–1731)
- Elizabeth Thomas (1770/71–1855)
- Mary Tighe (1772–1810)
- Elizabeth Tipper (1660–1698)
- Elizabeth Tollet (1694–1754)
- Elizabeth Sophia Tomlins (1763–1828)
- Margaret Turner (fl. 1790–1810)
- Anna Trapnel (fl. 1654–1660)
- Catherine Trotter (1679–1749)
- Elizabeth Tudor (1533–1603)

=== V ===
- Anne Vavasour (c. 1560 – c. 1650)

=== W ===
- Hannah Wallis (fl. 1787)
- Octavia Walsh (1677–1706)
- Catherine George Ward (born 1787)
- Elizabeth Wardlaw (1677–1727)
- Anna Weamys (fl. 1651)
- Jane West (1758–1852)
- Elizabeth Jane Weston (1581 or 1582 – 1612)
- Anne Wharton (1659–1685)
- Mary Whateley (1738–1825)
- Isabella Whitney (b. c.1540, fl. 1566–1573)
- Anna Williams (1706–1783)
- Helen Maria Williams (c. 1761 – 1827)
- Anne Wilson (fl.1778)
- Jane Wiseman (c. 1682 – 1717)
- Dorothy Wordsworth (1771–1855)
- Frances Wright (1795–1852)
- Mehetabel Wesley Wright (1697–1750)
- Maria Weylar (fl. 1770)
- Mary Wroth (1587–1652)

=== Y ===
- Ann Yearsley (née Cromartie; c. 1753 – 1806)
- Mary Julia Young (fl. 1787–1810; died 1821)

== See also ==
- List of 18th-century British working-class writers
- List of biographical dictionaries of women writers in English
- List of early-modern British women novelists
- List of early-modern British women playwrights
- List of female poets
- List of feminist poets
- List of poets
- List of women rhetoricians
- List of women writers
- Lists of writers
- Oxford period poetry anthologies
- Women Writers Project
- Women's writing (literary category)

== Resources ==
- Blain, Virginia, et al., eds. The Feminist Companion to Literature in English. New Haven and London: Yale UP, 1990. (Internet Archive)
- Buck, Claire, ed.The Bloomsbury Guide to Women's Literature. Prentice Hall, 1992. (Internet Archive)
- Greer, Germaine, ed. Kissing the Rod: an anthology of seventeenth-century women's verse. Farrar Straus Giroux, 1988.
- Lonsdale, Roger ed. Eighteenth Century Women Poets: An Oxford Anthology. New York: Oxford University Press, 1989.
- Oxford Dictionary of National Biography. Oxford: OUP, 2004.
- Robertson, Fiona, ed. Women's Writing, 1778–1838. Oxford: OUP, 2001. (Internet Archive)
- Schlueter, Paul, and June Schlueter. An encyclopedia of British women writers. Rutgers University Press, 1998. (Internet Archive)
- Todd, Janet, ed. British Women Writers: a critical reference guide. London: Routledge, 1989. (Internet Archive)
- Todd, Janet, ed. A Dictionary of British and American women writers, 1660-1800. Totowa, N.J.: Rowman & Allanheld, 1985. (Internet Archive)
