= Eighteenth Century Women Poets: An Oxford Anthology =

1989 poetry anthology

Eighteenth century women poets: an Oxford anthology
- Author: Roger Lonsdale
- Language: English
- Genre: Poetry
- Publisher: Oxford University Press
- Publication date: 1989
- Publication place: United Kingdom
- Media type: print
- Pages: xlvii, 555 pages; 23 cm
- ISBN: 9780198117698
- OCLC: 19122764
- LC Class: PR1177.V47 1989

Eighteenth century women poets: an Oxford anthology is a poetry anthology edited by Roger Lonsdale and published in 1989 by the Oxford University Press. In the introduction, Lonsdale notes that while the featured writers may have flourished, to one degree or another, during the eighteenth century, by the time he came to collect their work, many of them had "disappeared from view." Scholars since have credited Lonsdale's "unprecedented" work for opening up new avenues for teaching and research. The collection comprises three hundred and twenty-three separate poems by one hundred and seven different poets, fifteen of whom remain anonymous. The entries are arranged chronologically, and each includes a biographical note.

== Poets represented ==
- Jean Adam
- Mary Alcock
- Elizabeth Amherst
- Anonymous
- Anonymous
- Anonymous (“the amorous lady”)
- Anonymous (“Eliza”)
- Anonymous (“a female hand”)
- Anonymous (“a lady”)
- Anonymous (“a lady”)
- Anonymous (“a lady”)
- Anonymous (“a lady”)
- Anonymous (“a lady”)
- Anonymous (“a lady”)
- Anonymous (“a lady”)
- Anonymous (“Ophelia”)
- Joanna Baillie
- Anna Laetitia Barbauld
- Mary Barber
- Matilda Betham
- Susanna Blamire
- Annabella Blount
- Elizabeth Boyd
- Charlotte Brereton
- Jane Brereton
- Frances Burney
- Sophia Burrell
- Rebekah Carmichael
- Christian Carstairs
- Elizabeth Carter
- Jane Cave
- Georgiana Cavendish
- Susannah Centlivre
- Mary Chandler
- Hester Chapone
- Mary Chudleigh
- Alison Cockburn
- Mary Collier
- Hannah Cowley
- Frances Maria Cowper
- Ann Batten Cristall
- Mary Davys
- Sarah Dixon
- Dorothea Dubois
- Sarah Fyge Egerton
- Jean Elliot
- Maria and Harriet Falconar
- Anne Finch
- Martha Fowke
- Anne Francis
- Frances Greville
- Constantia Grierson
- Elizabeth Hands
- Anne Hunter
- Anne Ingram
- Catherine Jemmat
- Mary Jones
- Isabella Kelly
- Henrietta Knight
- Mary Latter
- Mary Leapor
- Helen Leigh
- Charlotte Lennox
- Esther Lewis
- Anne Lindsay
- Janet Little
- Mary Locke
- Maria Logan
- Judith Madan
- Mary Monck
- Mary Wortley Montagu
- Elizabeth Moody
- Hannah More
- Arabella Moreton
- Ann Murry
- Henrietta O'Neill
- Anne Penny
- Laetitia Pilkington
- Hester Lynch Piozzi
- Annabella Plumptre
- Priscilla Pointon
- Ann Radcliffe
- Clara Reeve
- Mary Robinson
- Elizabeth Singer Rowe
- Mary Savage
- Anna Sawyer
- Mary Scott
- Anna Seward
- Frances Seymour
- Charlotte Smith
- Ellen Taylor
- Elizabeth Teft
- Ann Thomas
- Elizabeth Thomas
- Elizabeth Tollet
- Miss W——
- Hannah Wallis
- Octavia Walsh
- Jane West
- Mary Whateley
- Anna Williams
- Helen Maria Williams
- Anne Wilson
- Jane Wiseman
- Mehetabel Wesley Wright
- Ann Yearsley

== Etext ==
- Lonsdale, Roger, ed. Eighteenth century women poets: an Oxford anthology. OUP, 1989. Open access from the Internet Archive.
