= List of early-modern British women playwrights =

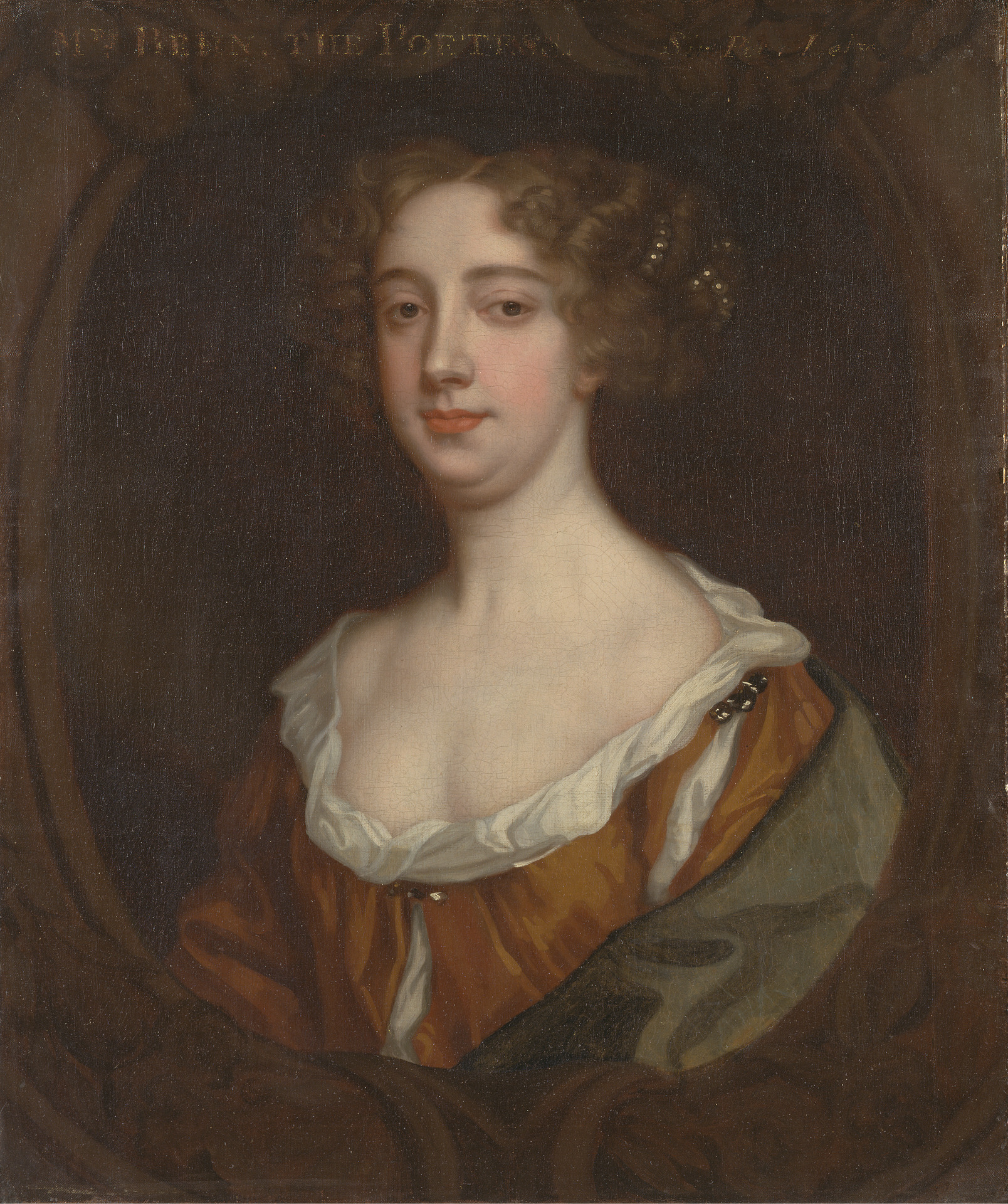
Aphra Behn, Restoration playwright, by Peter Lely

This table lists women playwrights who were active in England and Wales, and the Kingdom of Great Britain and Ireland, before the Victorian era, with a brief indication of productivity or other significant information. The entries may be reordered to browse by name or date. Authors of dramatic works are the focus of this list, though many of these writers worked in more than one genre.

== Playwrights ==
Playwrights
Name	Dates	Notes
Abington, Frances	1737–1815	actor who wrote two plays, only one produced
Amherst, Elizabeth Frances	1716?–1779	poet and naturalist whose Dramatick pastoral was produced in 1762
Ariadne	1694-95 (fl.)	pseudonym of unknown author of She Ventures and He Wins
Aubin, Penelope	1679? – 1731?	primarily a novelist; one play produced
Baillie, Joanna	1762–1851	prolific playwright
Balfour, Mary E.	1789–1810 (fl.)	one play produced, Belfast
Barrell, Maria (née Weylar)	1803 (death)	born in West Indies; poet, playwright, and writer for periodicals
Barrymore, Mrs. W[illiam?]	1823 (fl.)	one play produced
Behn, Aphra	1640–1689	usually credited with being the first female professional playwright in English
Berry, Mary	1763–1852	one play produced, one in manuscript
Boaden, Caroline	1821–1839 (fl.)	author of at least six plays; daughter of James Boaden
Booth, Ursula Agnes	1740–1803	actor who wrote at least one farce
Boothby, Frances	1669–1670 (fl.)	author of the first original play by a woman to be produced in London
Bourchier, Rachel (Countess of Bath; née Fane)	1613–1680	wrote masques
Bowes, Mary (Countess of Strathmore and Kinghorne)	1749–1800	published one play
Boyd, Elizabeth	1710?– 1745?	one play; wrote primarily in other genres
Brand, Barbarina	1768–1854	published four plays, one produced
Brand, Hannah	1754–1821	published playwright
Brooke, Charlotte	1740–1793	one play published but not produced
Brooke, Frances	1723–1789	primarily a novelist; wrote comic opera
Browning, Elizabeth Barrett	1806–1861	primarily a poet; one closet drama and one translation
Burgess, Mrs.	1779–1780 (fl.)	one comedy, produced in Canterbury
Burke, Miss	1793 (fl.)	one comic opera/burletta
Burney, Frances	1752–1840	primarily a novelist; author of several plays, only one produced in her lifetime
Burney, Frances	1776–1828	niece of Frances Burney; wrote two tragedies which were published but not produced
Burrell, Sophia	1753–1802	author of two tragedies
Carstairs, Christian	1763—1786 (fl.)	poet who wrote a short theatrical
Cary, Elizabeth (Viscountess Falkland; née Tanfield)	1585–1639	first woman known to have written and published an original play in English
Cavendish, Jane	1620?–1669	co-authored a pastoral masque with her sister, Elizabeth Egerton
Cavendish, Margaret (Duchess of Newcastle)	1623–1673	author of closet dramas
Celesia, Dorothea	1738 (baptised); d. 1790	translated Voltaire's Tancrède
Centlivre, Susannah	1667?–1723	successful playwright
Chambers, Marianne	1799–1812 (fl.)	English playwright
Charke, Charlotte	1713–1760	playwright/actor/manager
Cibber, Susannah	1714–1766	actor who had at least one masque produced
Clive, Catherine	1711–1785	actor; wrote farces with some success
Collier, Jane	1714–1755	The Cry (1754), co-authored with Sarah Fielding
Cooper, Elizabeth (née Price)	1698?–1761?	actor, playwright, and poet
Corbett sisters, Walterina Cunningham (d. 1837) and Grace Corbett (c. 1765–1843)	1765?– 1837	novelists, playwrights, and anthologists
Cornelys, Margaret	1723–1797	author of two comedies and a ballad opera; only one produced (Dublin 1781)
Cowley, Hannah	1743–1809	playwright and poet
Craven, Elizabeth	1750–1828	writer of farces and pantomimes
Cullum, Mrs.	1775 (fl.)	one drama, not produced
Cuthbertson, Catherine	1793 (fl.)	novelist who wrote one play
Davys, Mary	1674–1732	novelist; produced one play; had another published
De Humboldt, Charlotte	1821–1838 (fl.)	poet and author of the tragedy Corinth (1821)
Deverell, Mary	1731–1805	author of two plays, neither performed
Dubois, Dorothea	1728–1774	wrote musical entertainments
Edgeworth, Maria	1768–1849	widely read novelist who also wrote comic dramas; published but not performed
Edwards, Anna Maria	1783–1787 (fl.)	one play, produced in Dublin
Edwards, Christian	1776–1787 (fl.)	one play, published but not produced
Egerton, Elizabeth	1626–1663	co-authored a pastoral masque with her sister, Jane Cavendish
Egleton, Jane	1734 (death)	actor who wrote a ballad opera
Fielding, Sarah	1710–1768	The Cry (1754), co-authored with Jane Collier
Finch, Anne (Countess of Winchilsea)	1661–1720	primarily a poet; also wrote verse dramas
Forsyth, Elizabeth	1784–1789 (fl.)	author of The Siege of Quebec
Francis, Ann	1738–1800	poetic dramatization of The Song of Solomon (1781)
Fraser, Susan	1809–1816 (fl.)	author of one poetic tragedy, Comala (1809)
Gardner, Sarah (née Cheney)	1763–1795 (fl.)	comedic actor and playwright
Geisweiler, Maria	1799–1800 (fl.)	author of dramas, unproduced
Goldsmith, Mary	1800–1804 (fl.)	author of two comic pieces
Gore, Catherine	1799–1861	eleven plays produced
Green, Mrs.	1756 (fl.)	author of one play
Griffith, Elizabeth	1727?–1793	playwright
Gunning, Elizabeth	1769–1823	a tragicomedy, not produced
Harlow, Elizabeth	1789 (fl.)	bookseller; author of one comedy
Harrison, Elizabeth	1724–1756 (fl.)	The Death of Socrates in Miscellanies on moral and religious subjects (1756)
Harvey, Margaret	1768–1858	English poet, scholar, and playwright
Haywood, Eliza	1693–1756	long career writing in many genres
Helme, Elizabeth	1743–1814	educational writer who translated two children's plays
Hemans, Felicia	1793–1835	primarily a poet; some verse drama
Hill, Philippina (née Burton)	1768-87 (fl.)	poet and author of one produced play
Hofland, Barbara	1770–1844	prolific writer who published one volume of dramas for children
Holcroft, Frances	1780–1844	poet, novelist, translator of plays
Holford, Margaret (the elder)	1757–1834	one play produced
Holford, Margaret (the younger)	1778–1852	one play, neither published nor produced
Hook, Harriet Horncastle	1784 (fl.)	author of one comic opera
Hoper, Rachael	1742–1760 (fl.)	three plays produced
Hornby, Mary	1819–1820 (fl.)	two plays, neither produced
Hughes, Anne	1784–1797 (fl.)	novelist and poet who wrote Moral dramas intended for private representation (1790)
Hull, Elizabeth Edmead	1786–1832 (fl.)	The Events of the Day (prod. Norwich, 1795)
Inchbald, Elizabeth	1753–1821	widely published in various genres
Isdell, Sarah	1805–1825 (fl.)	two plays produced but not printed
Kemble, Maria Theresa	1774–1838	actor, singer, dancer, and comic playwright
Kennedy, Grace	1782–1825	writer on religious subjects who wrote one drama, not performed
Killigrew, Anne	1660–1685	"A Pastoral Dialogue" published in Poems (1686)
La Roche-Guilhem, Anne de	1644–1707	wrote Rare on tout (1677), a masque for Charles II
Latter, Mary	1725–1777	one tragedy produced
Lawrence, Rose D'Aguilar	1799–1836 (fl.)	poet and author of one play, not performed
Leadbeater, Mary	1758–1826	Irish Quaker author whose work included dramatic dialogues
Leapor, Mary	1722–1746	English poet who wrote one tragedy, not produced
Le Fanu, Alicia Sheridan	1753–1817	Irish author of one comedy
Lee, Harriet	1757–1851	playwright
Lee, Sophia	1750–1824	playwright
Lennox, Charlotte (née Ramsay)	1730?–1804	Scottish novelist, playwright, and poet
Lumley, Jane	1537–1578	first translator of Euripides into English
Macauley, Elizabeth	1785?–1837	actor and author
Manley, Delarivier	1670?–1724	playwright
Marishall, Jean (Jane Marshall)	1765–1788 (fl.)	one play
McCarthy, Charlotte	1745-1768 (fl.)	Irish novelist and religious writer who wrote one dramatic dialogue
Metcalfe, Catherine	1790 (death)	one tragedy
Minton, Ann	1785 (birth)	A Wife to be Lett; or, The Miser Cured (1802)
Mitford, Mary Russell	1787–1855	playwright
Montagu, Mary Wortley (Lady Mary)	1689–1762	prolific writer whose comedy, Simplicity, was not produced
More, Hannah	1745–1833	playwright; published in many genres
M'Taggart, Ann Hamilton	1753?–1834	published playwright, none produced
Nooth, Charlotte	1807–1816 (fl.)	poet who published one play
O'Brien, Mary	1785–1790 (fl.)	Irish poet and playwright
Opie, Amelia	1769–1853	English abolitionist and writer, mainly of novels and poetry
Owenson, Olivia (Lady Clarke)	1785–1845	Irish poet and dramatist
Owenson, Sydney (Lady Morgan)	1781?–1859	Irish writer known mainly for novels
Parsons, Eliza	1739–1811	prolific Gothic novelist; one play produced
Penny, Anne (née Hughes)	1729–1784	Welsh poet and author of one dramatic entertainment
Philips, Katherine	1631–1664	poet; author of two plays (one unfinished)
Pilkington, Laetitia	1709–1750	Anglo-Irish poet; one play produced
Pinchard, Elizabeth (née Sibthorpe)	1791–1820 (fl.)	novelist; wrote dramatic dialogues for young readers
Piozzi, Hester Thrale	1741–1821	author and patron; two unpublished plays
Pix, Mary	1666–1709	playwright
Plowden, Francis	1827 (death)	author of one comic opera
Plumptre, Annabella	1769–1838	collaborated with her sister, Anne Plumptre
Plumptre, Anne	1760–1818	wrote primarily in other genres; translated dramas
Polack, Elizabeth	1830–1838 (fl.)	author of five plays, three extant
Polwheele, Elizabeth	1651?–1691?	two plays extant
Pope, Jane	1744–1818	English actor; one comedy produced, 1767
Porter, Anna Maria	1778–1832	poet and novelist whose The Fair Fugitives was produced in 1803
Porter, Jane	1776–1850	two plays
Pye, Jael (née Mendez)	1737?–1782	published four works, each in a different genre
Richardson, Elizabeth	1779 (death)	author of The double deception; or, lovers perplex'd
Richardson, Sarah Watts	1824 (death)	poet, novelist, playwright
Robe, Jane	1723 (fl.)	author of The Fatal Legacy (1723)
Roberts, Rose	1730–1788	translator, poet, and writer of sermons who wrote at least one drama
Robertson, Fanny	1765–1855	actor-manager, author of at least two plays
Robinson, Mary	1757–1800	wrote primarily in other genres; one play produced
Ross, Anna	1773 (birth)	performer; wrote comic opera
Rowson, Susanna (née Haswell)	1762–1824	British-American novelist, poet, playwright
Ryves, Elizabeth	1750–1797	Irish poet, dramatist, novelist, journalist, and translator
Sanders, Charlotte Elizabeth	1787–1803 (fl.)	wrote plays for young readers
Satchell, Elizabeth (later Kemble)	1763–1841	actor; one pastoral produced
Scott, Jane	1779–1839	theatre manager, actor, and prolific playwright
Serres, Olivia (née Wilmot)	1772–1834	published Flights of Fancy: Consisting of Miscellaneous Poems. With the Castle of Avola, an Opera, in Three Acts. London: J. Ridgway, 1805.
Sheridan, Elizabeth	1758–1837	wrote one play, since lost
Sheridan, Frances	1724–1766	playwright
Short, Mrs. C.	1792 (fl.)	Dramas for the Use of Young Ladies (1792)
Sidney, Mary	1561–1621	translated one play
Smith, Charlotte	1749–1806	novelist and poet; one comedy attributed to her
Starke, Mariana	1761–1838	author of four plays, not all produced; mainly a travel writer
Stratford, Agnes	1794–1795 (fl.)	one tragedy, published but not produced
Sutton, Katherine of	1358–1376 (fl.)	abbess who rewrote several mystery plays; considered England's first woman playwright
Tollet, Elizabeth	1694–1754	Susanna; or innocence preserved, in Poems on several occasions (1755; not produced)
Trimmer, Sarah	1741–1810	prolific educational writer; author of The little hermit; or, the rural adventure (1788; not produced)
Trotter, Catherine	1679–1749	playwright
Turner, Margaret	1790–1810 (fl.)	pastoral
Wallace, Eglantine (née Maxwell)	1803 (death)	comedies and tragedy
West, Jane	1758–1852	wrote primarily in other genres
Wharton, Anne (née Lee)	1659–1685	poet and verse dramatist
Whitlock, Elizabeth (née Kemble)	1761–1836	known mainly for acting
Wilson, Ann	1778–1812 (fl.)	Jephthah's daughter (1783; not produced)
Wiseman, Jane	1682?–1717 (fl.)	author of one produced play
Wroth, Mary (Lady Mary)	1587–1652	primarily a poet; one drama extant
Yearsley, Ann	1753?–1806	primarily a poet; produced and published one play
Yorke, Elizabeth (Countess of Hardwicke; née Lindsay)	1763–1858	playwright

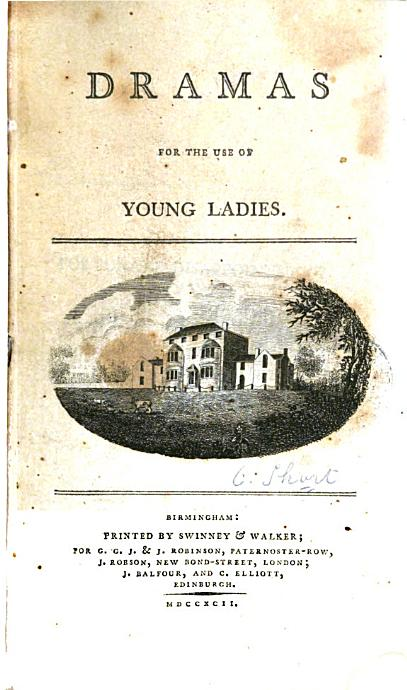
Title page of Dramas for the Use of Young Ladies by Mrs C. Short (1792) (Etext, Google)

== See also ==
- List of biographical dictionaries of women writers in English
- List of early-modern British women novelists
- List of early-modern British women poets
- List of female poets
- List of feminist poets
- List of playwrights
- List of playwrights by nationality and date of birth
- List of women rhetoricians
- List of women writers
- Women Writers Project
- Women's writing (literary category)

== Notes and references ==
=== References ===
- Blain, Virginia, et al., eds. The Feminist Companion to Literature in English. New Haven and London: Yale UP, 1990. (Internet Archive)
- Buck, Claire, ed.The Bloomsbury Guide to Women's Literature. Prentice Hall, 1992. (Internet Archive)
- Chadwyck-Healey Database of English Prose Drama (through 1750) and (1750–1939)
- Mann, David (1996). Women Playwrights in England, Ireland, and Scotland, 1660-1823. Bloomington: Indiana University Press. ISBN 0-253-33087-4.
- Oxford Dictionary of National Biography. Oxford: OUP, 2004.
- Robertson, Fiona, ed. Women's Writing, 1778–1838. Oxford: OUP, 2001. (Internet Archive)
- Schlueter, Paul, and June Schlueter. An encyclopedia of British women writers. Rutgers University Press, 1998. (Internet Archive)
- Todd, Janet, ed. British Women Writers: a critical reference guide. London: Routledge, 1989. (Internet Archive)
