= Women's writing =

Women's writing may refer to a variety of topics related generally to women writers or women's literature:

- Chick lit, popular fiction targeted at younger women
- Écriture féminine, postmodern feminist literary theory
- Feminist literary criticism
- Women in speculative fiction, including science fiction
- Women's page, newspaper section for topics presumed to interest women
- Women's script (disambiguation), variation of syllabic characters in some writing systems
- Women's writing (literary category), academic discipline within literary studies

Lists

- List of biographical dictionaries of women writers
- List of biographical dictionaries of women writers in English
- List of early-modern British women novelists
- List of early-modern British women playwrights
- List of early-modern British women poets
- List of female rhetoricians
- List of women anthologists
- List of women writers
