= Elizabeth Frances Amherst =

Elizabeth Frances Amherst may refer to:

- Elizabeth Amherst Hale (1774–1826), British-born Canadian watercolourist
- Elizabeth Frances Amherst (poet) (c. 1716–1779), British poet and amateur naturalist
