= Manuel Núñez =

Manuel Núñez may refer to:

- Manuel Núñez Asencio (born 1957), Dominican historian
- Manuel Ángel Núñez Soto (born 1951), Mexican politician
- Manuel Núñez Pérez (born 1933), Spanish politician
- Manuel Núñez Tovar (1872–1928), Venezuelan naturalist

== See also ==
- Chema (footballer, born 1997), José Manuel Núñez Martín, Spanish footballer
- Cristian Núñez (footballer, born 1980), Cristian Manuel Núñez, Argentine footballer
- Dom Núñez (born 1995), Dominic Manuel Núñez, American baseball player
- Manuela Nuñez de Almeida, 18th-century British Jewish poet
- Xosé Manoel Núñez Seixas (born 1966), Spanish historian
