= List of women writers =

The list of women writers has been split into two lists:

- List of women writers (A–L)
- List of women writers (M–Z)

== Other lists ==
- List of biographical dictionaries of female writers
- List of early-modern British women novelists
- List of early-modern British women playwrights
- List of early-modern British women poets
- List of female detective/mystery writers
- List of female poets
- List of female rhetoricians
- List of feminist literature
- List of women anthologists
- List of women cookbook writers
- List of women electronic literature writers
- List of women hymn writers
- List of women sportswriters
- Lists of women writers by nationality

== See also ==
- Chawton House Library: Women's Novels
- Collective 18th-century biographies of literary women
- Eighteenth century women poets: an Oxford anthology
- Feminist literary criticism
- Feminist science fiction
- Feminist theory
- Gender in science fiction
- Mothers of the Novel: 100 Good Women Writers Before Jane Austen
- Norton Anthology of Literature by Women
- Sophie (digital lib)
- Women in science fiction
- Women Writers Project
- Women's writing in English
