= 1779 in poetry =

Nationality words link to articles with information on the nation's poetry or literature (for instance, Irish or France).

== Events ==
- Phillis Wheatley advertises six times in the Boston Evening Post & General Advertiser for subscribers to a volume of poetry she proposes to publish, but the volume never appears, apparently for lack of support; United States

== Works published ==
=== United Kingdom ===
- William Cowper and John Newton, Olney Hymns, 66 by Cowper (marked "C" to distinguish them from Newtown's), another 282 by Newton; the work was popular, with many editions published
- Robert Fergusson, Poems on Various Subjects, Part 2 of Poems 1773
- William Hayley, Epistle to Admiral Keppel, published anonymously
- Samuel Johnson, Prefaces, Biographical and Critical, to the Works of the English Poets (published from this year through 1781), in 10 volumes, with later editions titled Lives of the English Poets; 52 critical biographies
- Ann Murry, Poems on Various Subjects

=== United States ===
- Philip Freneau, "The House of Night" (expanded, 1786)
- Jonathan Odell, "Word of Congress"
- Charles Henry Wharton, A Poetical Epistle to His Excellency George Washington

== Births ==
Death years link to the corresponding "[year] in poetry" article:

- January 20 – Adam Oehlenschläger (died 1850), Danish poet
- March 3 – Matthäus Casimir von Collin (died 1824), Austrian poet
- March 30 – Antoine Ó Raifteirí (died 1835), Irish poet, "last of the wandering bards"
- May 28 – Thomas Moore (died 1852), Irish-born poet, singer, songwriter and entertainer
- July 15 – Clement Moore (died 1863), American credited as the author of "A Visit from St. Nicholas" (more commonly known today as "Twas the Night Before Christmas")
- August 1 – Francis Scott Key (died 1843), American lawyer, writer and amateur poet, author of the words to the United States' national anthem, "The Star-Spangled Banner"
- November 5 – Washington Allston (died 1843), American poet and painter

== Deaths ==
Birth years link to the corresponding "[year] in poetry" article:

- March 4 – Heinrich Leopold Wagner (born 1747), German writer and poet
- April 1 – John Langhorne (born 1735), English poet and clergyman
- April 20 – Thomas Penrose (born 1742), English poet and clergyman
- July 29 – Peter Wilhelm Hensler (born 1742), German
- August 3 – Kenrick Prescot (born 1703), English scholar and poet
- September 7 – John Armstrong (born 1709), Scottish-born poet and physician
- Also:
  - Elizabeth Amherst (born c. 1716), English poet and amateur naturalist

== See also ==
- List of years in poetry
- List of years in literature
- 18th century in poetry
- 18th century in literature
- French literature of the 18th century
- Sturm und Drang (the conventional translation is "Storm and Stress"; a more literal translation, however, might be "storm and urge", "storm and longing", "storm and drive" or "storm and impulse"), a movement in German literature (including poetry) and music from the late 1760s through the early 1780s
- List of years in poetry
- Poetry
