= David Ramsay Hay =

Scottish artist and interior decorator (1798–1866)

- portrait by George Harvey
- Born: March 1798; Edinburgh
- Died: 10 September 1866; Edinburgh
- Occupations: Painter, interior architect, decorator, author, artist
- Mother: Rebekah Carmichael
- Awards: Fellowship of the Royal Society of Edinburgh

David Ramsay Hay FRSE (March 1798, Edinburgh – 10 September 1866) was a Scottish artist, interior decorator, and colour theorist.

== Life ==
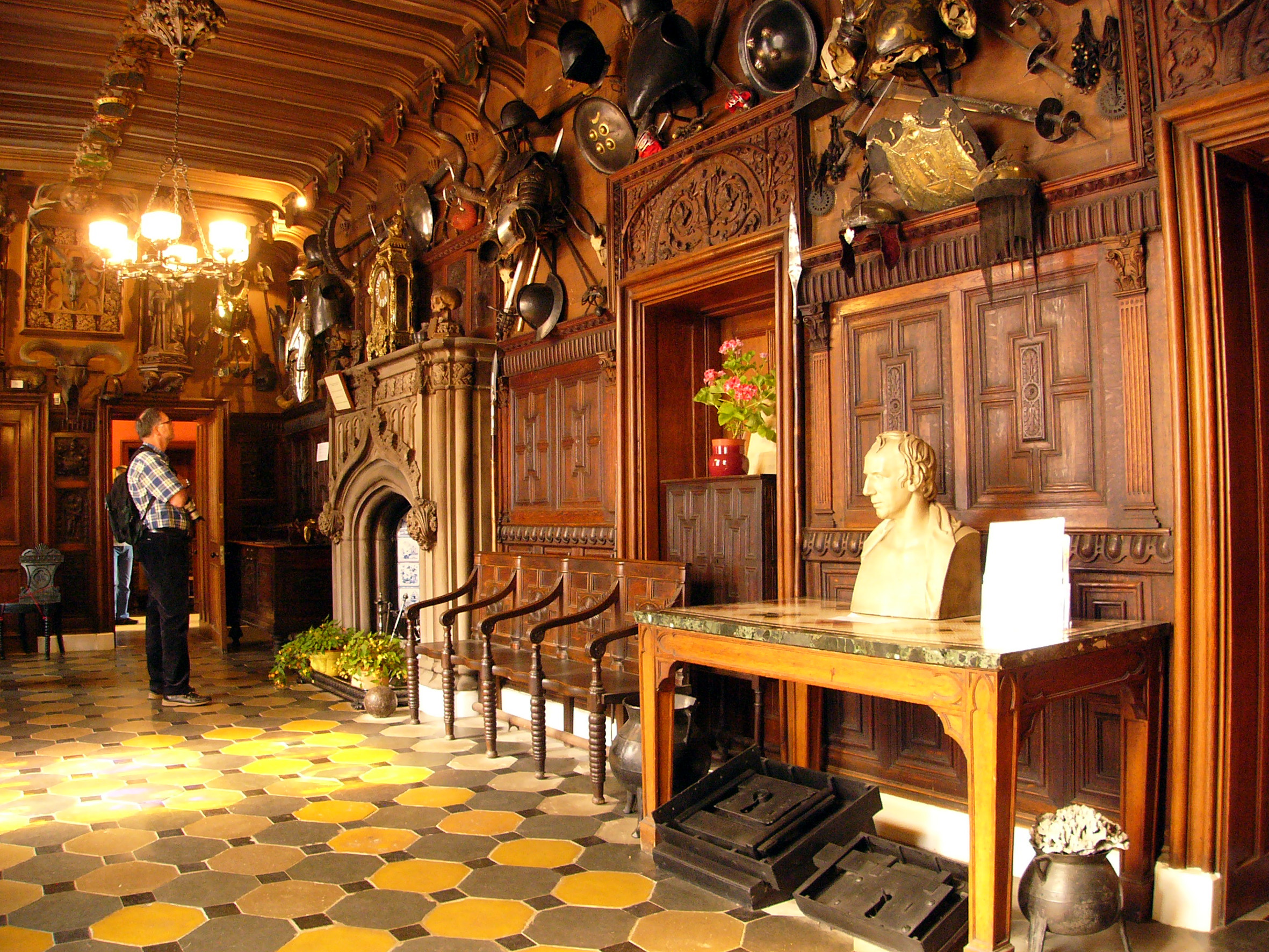
Entrance Hall at Abbotsford, decorated by David Ramsay Hay, 1824

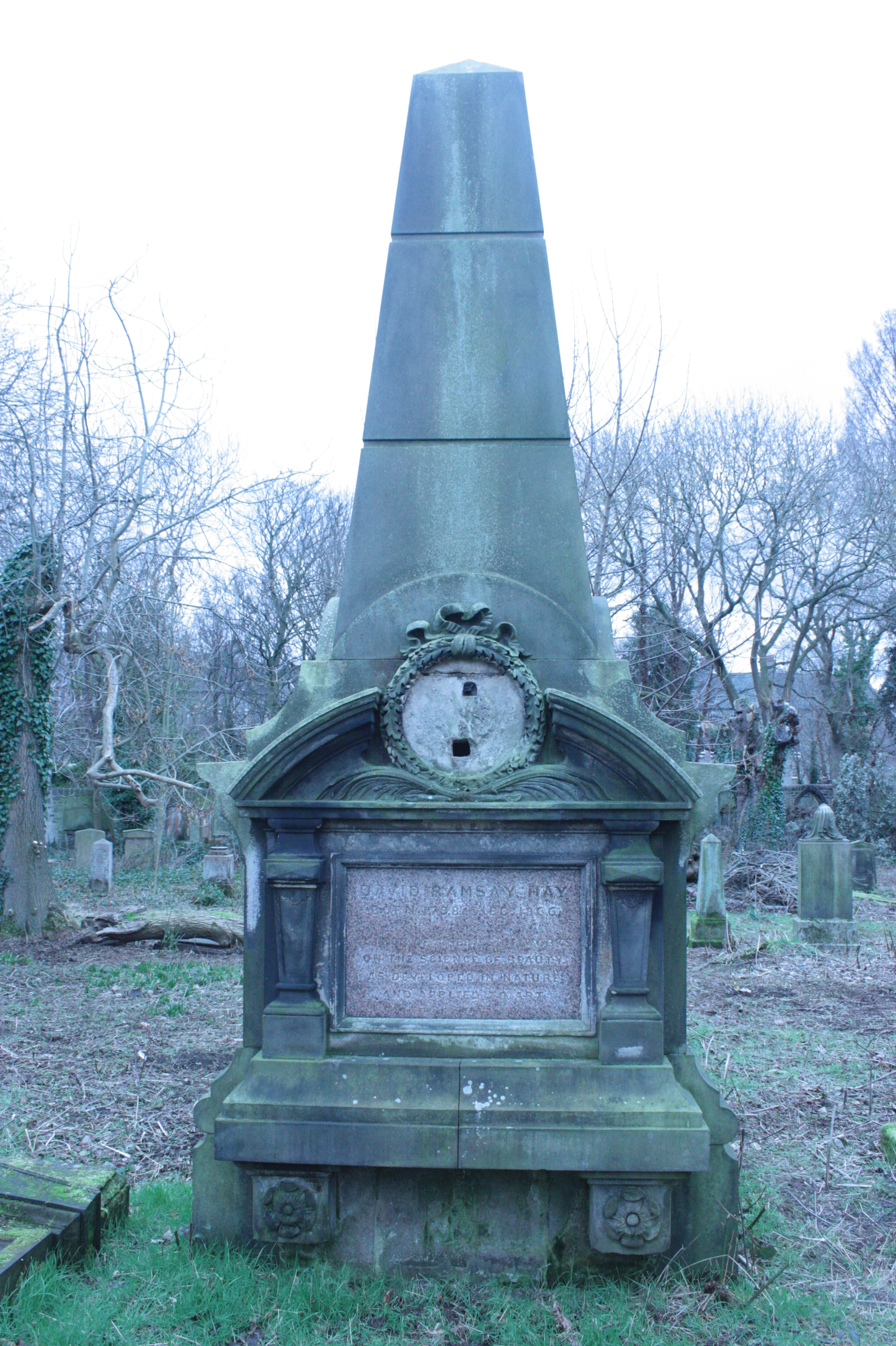
The grave of David Ramsay Hay, Warriston Cemetery, Edinburgh

David Ramsay Hay was the son of Rebekah or Rebecca Carmichael, a published poet and friend of Robert Burns. They lived at the foot of Monteith's Close off the Royal Mile in Edinburgh. After her husband died prematurely and penniless, David was educated at the expense of her brother, David Ramsay, a banker and owner of the Edinburgh Evening Courant, then apprenticed as a reading-boy in Ramsay's printing office in Edinburgh. Instead though (around 1813), Hay moved to join Gavin Beugo (son of John Beugo) a decorative artist, based on West Register Street in Edinburgh's New Town. His fellow-apprentice was his friend, the topographical artist David Roberts. In April 1820 he commenced work at Abbotsford for Walter Scott. In 1850 he decorated Holyroodhouse for Queen Victoria. In the 1920s, Queen Mary had these decorative schemes painted over, but watercolours commissioned by Victoria in 1863 give some idea of their appearance.

Hay was an advocate of imitative finishes such as graining and marbling, and textured paints to imitate brocade fabrics. From 1828, he developed his theory of colour harmony over six successive editions of his book, The Laws of Harmonious Colouring Adapted to Interior Decorations. Hay wrote about his experience decorating Abbotsford for Walter Scott in the sixth edition of his Harmonious Colouring.

In his final years he had exclusive premises at 90 George Street in the centre of Edinburgh's New Town.

He died in Edinburgh on 10 September 1866. He is buried in Warriston Cemetery in the north of the city. The substantial tombstone stands to the south-west of the sealed eastern entrance. The monument is vandalised and the original bronze bas-relief sculpture of his profile has been stolen.

== Publications ==
- The Laws of Harmonious Colouring in House Painting (1828)
- The Natural Principles and Analogy of the Harmony of Form (1842)
- Proportion: or the Geometric Principle of Beauty Analysed (1843)
- First Principles of Symmetrical Beauty (1846)
- The Science of Beauty (1856)
- "A Nomenclature of Colours" (1845)
