= Women's script =

Women's script or women's writing may refer to:

- Nüshu (女書 or 女书, 'women's script'), a syllabic script used to write the Chinese language Xiangnan Tuhua
- Hiragana, a Japanese syllabary sometimes called onnade (女手), 'women's writing'
- The Korean alphabet, sometimes pejoratively called amgeul (암글) or amkeul (암클), 'women's script'
- Vaybertaytsh (װײַבערטײַטש, 'women's taytsh') or vaybershrift (װײַבערשריפֿט, 'women's writing'), a semi-cursive script typeface for the Yiddish alphabet

== See also ==
- Women's writing (disambiguation)
