= Mary Fage =

Mary Fage (fl. 1637) was a middle-class English poet known only through her one book, Fames Roule, published in 1637. Fames Roule is a collection of over four hundred acrostic verses, each one an anagram addressed to a noble person in the early Stuart court, in the order of legal precedence.

== Family ==
The only identification we have of Mary Fage is on the title page of Fames Roule, where she writes: "By Mistris Mary Fage, wife of Robert Fage the younger, Gentleman." Betty S. Travitsky's research into Mary Fage's genealogy through Essex parish records has led to a tentative connection to a Robert Fage in Doddinghurst parish, Essex, and an Edward Fage of the same parish (presumably Mary's father). If this is the case, Mary Fage was native to Doddinghurst, and one of the rare women during that time that did not change their surname. The little documentation about this Mary and Robert Fage allude to the birth of one son in 1637 and of the death of another son 1638. This Robert Fage did some translations, although it is not clear whether or not he can be connected to several other original publications under the same name.

Being married to this Robert Fage would make Mary Fage connected to the Caroline court through her husband's extended family. While there is no evidence that Mary or Robert had any direct relation with the court, Robert Fage's father was a well-trained lawyer and related (by marriage) to a local family of lawyers, the Barkers. One of the Barkers had sat in the previous two parliaments, and another was the serjeant-at-law.

== Her work: Fames Roule ==
=== Overview ===
In Fames Roule, Mary Fage uses the fashion of acrostic poetry to honour those most powerful in the early Stuart court. Word play was fashionable among the upper-class in Renaissance England. In 1589, George Puttenham described the anagram, or "Poesie Transposed" as an appropriate pastime and exercise of wit for women, seeing no loss or gain in the practice. The acrostic was a lighter form of wordplay that had been adopted by contemporary poets as a form of patterned poetry. In 1637, when Fames Roule was published, the acrostic was a major feature of the literary culture.

The title Fames Roule is itself a play on words – it can be read as either "Fame’s Rule" or "Fame’s Roll." This collection of over 400 complimentary acrostic poems follows the legal hierarchy of the court, beginning with King Charles I. The only women included in the collection are the queen, Henrietta Maria, and her daughters, making this a realistic depiction of the power relations during the Caroline era.

Most scholars who have written anything about Mary Fage's Fames Roule have read it as merely a solicitation for money or gifts. Margaret J. M. Ezell argues that as such, Fames Roule was a rare piece of openly professional writing from a woman during the 17th century. Ezell writes, "Mary Fage lays claim to being, if not the first female professional writer, then the one most blatant in her search for patronage." To do so, Fage calls on not only the tradition of acrostics, but also a tradition of cataloguing. Her appropriation of catalogue techniques for personal gain shows Fage's skill with language. Yet Travitsky suggests that a monetary analysis of Fage's motives for writing Fames Roule is limiting. Viewed in the context of the political climate in which it was published, Fames Roule can be read as Mary Fage's effort to align herself with the Stuart regime.

=== Context ===
Fames Roule was published during the reign of Charles I, whose unpopular reign ended in his execution in 1649. Many of his English subjects opposed his actions, specifically the collection of royal taxes without parliamentary consent and his interference with the churches of England and Scotland. Within the same year Fames Roule was published, Charles I faced uprisings in Scotland after he attempted to institute a high-church liturgy and prayer book. These riots led to the formation of the National Covenant in Scotland, and became the precursor to the First Bishops' War. By lauding Charles I, and his subsequent court, Mary Fage took a political stance with her publication.

Additionally, Fames Roule's attention to rank follows the tone of the English court under Charles I. In an attempt to establish government and order in the kingdom, Charles led a court that emphasised ritual and formality. The details of rank provided a guide through which to address the court with decorum. In court, Charles held the Order of the Garter in particularly high esteem, and that is reflected in a separate set of poems within Fames Roule titled "Sainct George His Knights."

The printing history surrounding Fames Roule also suggests Fage aligned with the crown. Charles I was especially sensitive to critical publications. In 1637, the same year of Fames Roule's publication, Charles passed the Star Chamber decree – a document censoring publications against the crown. While somewhat ineffectual, the passage of the document signals that the court felt threatened. Fames Roule was printed under John Crouch, a publisher who was connected with royalist writings, so it was likely to have been an acceptable piece to the crown. To a court threatened by critiques, Fames Roule might have provided a necessary reassurance of its greatness.
