= Susanna Hawkins =

Scottish poet

- Born: 1787; Ecclefechan, Scotland
- Died: March 1868 (aged 80–81)
- Occupation: Poet
- Known for: The Poems and Songs of Susanna Hawkins

Susanna Hawkins (1787–1868) was a Scottish poet.

== Early life ==
Susanna Hawkins was born in 1787, close to Ecclefechan, in Scotland. Her father was a blacksmith. Early in her life Hawkins was a domestic servant, during this time she managed to obtain some elementary education, which allowed her to begin writing poems.

== Major works ==
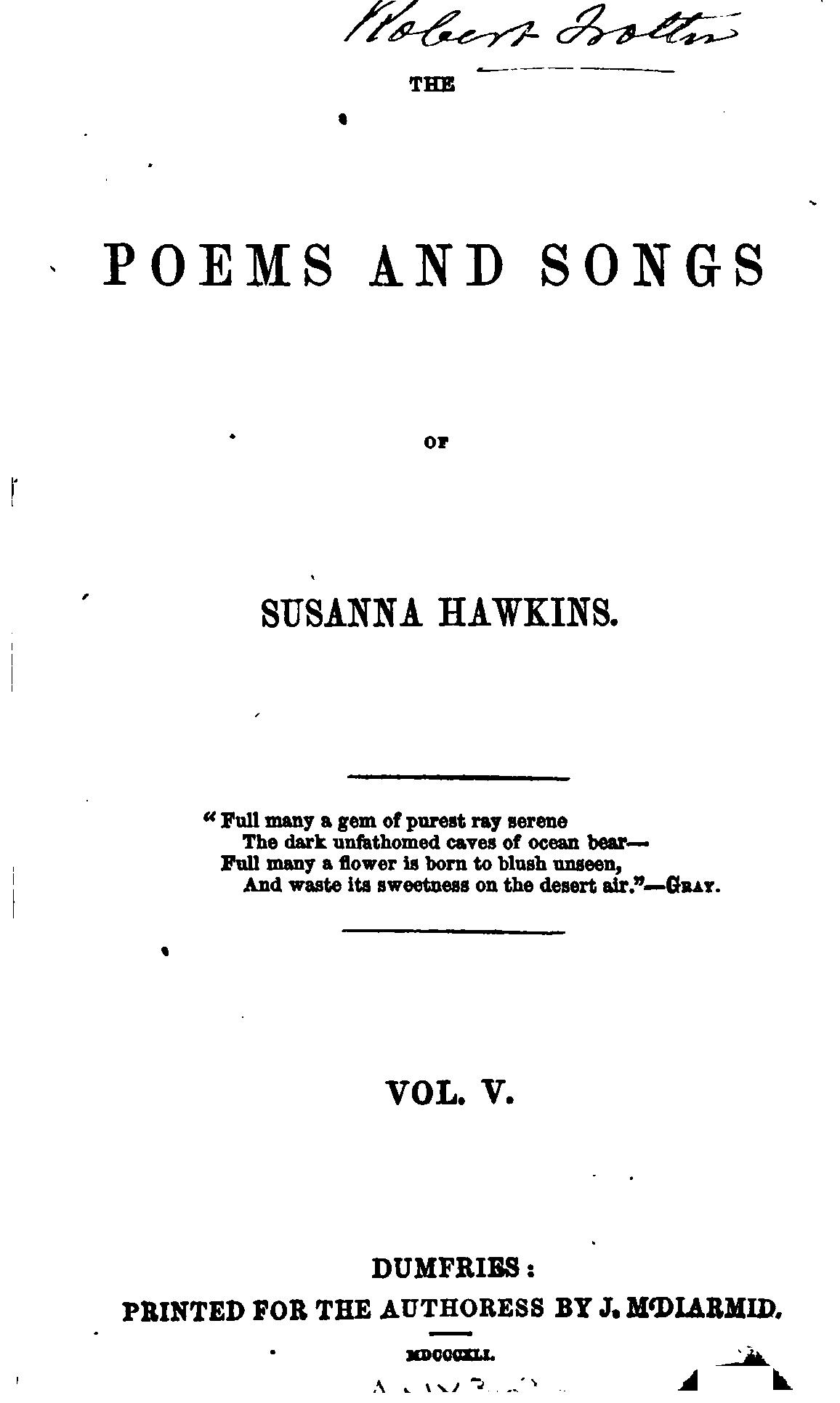
Title page Poems and Songs volume 5

Hawkins began to publish her poems around 1826. One of her major works, known as The Poems and Songs of Susanna Hawkins, which was first published in 1838, and the first edition consisting of sixty pages. Her poems were often published in small volumes that had paper covers. With nine volumes in total, Hawkins would go to the doors of many homes in an attempt to sell her work. Hawkins was supported by the patronage of Dowager marchioness of Queensberry and her books were printed pro bono by the owner of the Dumfries Courier. Hawkins' last volume was published in 1861, before her death in March 1868.

== Major themes ==
Overall, Hawkins' poems emphasized the concern she had for men and women belonging to the middle and upper class. Specifically, in her poem, "Lines of a Gentleman's Son," she portrayed her emotions for a child who was a part of the upper-class. These poems alternate between her sentiment for people in society and the royal family and moral values which she depicted in rural scenes. Additionally, some of her poems are written about specific individuals, like To Lady Christian Douglas, To Mrs. Hogg, and Letter to a Young Lady.

== See also ==
- Margaret Harvey, 18th/18th-century English woman poet
- Mary Linskill, 19th-century English woman poet, novelist and short-story writer
