= Elizabeth Teft =

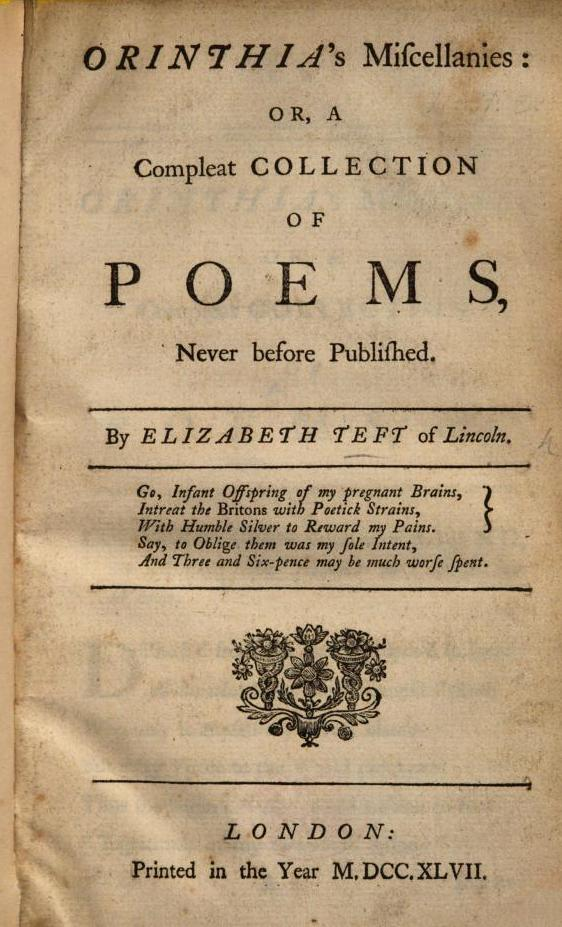
- Title page of Orinthia's Miscellanies; or, A Compleat Collection of Poems, Never Before Published. By Elizabeth Teft of Lincoln (London, 1747)
- Born: 1723/1724; Rothwell, Lincolnshire, England
- Died: after 1747
- Occupation: writer
- Relatives: Joshua Teft (father)
- Writing career
- Pen name: Orinthia
- Language: English
- Years active: 1741—1747
- Notable work: Orinthia's Miscellanies (1747)

Elizabeth Teft (fl. 1741—1747) was the author of a miscellany of occasional, topical, and political poetry. Although little is known of her life, her work has garnered scholarly interest.

== Life ==
Not much is known about Teft other than what can be read or inferred from her writing. The editors of one modern anthology generally describe her as "an Anglican from the middling ranks." Various researchers have sought to identify her more specifically. There is a record of an Elizabeth Teft having been born in Rothwell, Lincolnshire in 1723, usually considered to be the writer, but that Elizabeth Teft seems to have died in infancy in 1724. It is possible that Elizabeth Teft, the writer, was born subsequently to the parents of the deceased Elizabeth and given the same name, a not uncommon practice at that time of high infant mortality. Orlando identifies her father as one Joshua Teft; Roger Lonsdale identified a John Teft, cleric, as a probable relative.

== Writing ==
The mystery surrounding Teft's life has not prevented readers from engaging with her work, then and now. One commentator has written that her work "suggests considerable independence of mind." In "On Learning. Desired by a Gentleman," she criticizes the traditional education of girls and women:

Well, Ignorance, the cause is yet unknown
Why thou'rt confined unto my sex alone.
Why are not girls, as boys, sent forth when young
To learn the Latin, Greek, and Hebrew tongue? (ll. 1—4)

In other poems, Teft writes about friendship, politics, and popular literature: in "To the Unjust Author of Pamela in High Life," she rebukes Samuel Richardson for giving the heroine of his bestselling novel Pamela, or Virtue Rewarded the "harsh reward" (l. 22) of marriage to her adversary-turned-lover, Mr. B. Some poems are topical, such as "On hearing the Duke of Cumberland had defeated the Rebels." She often writes with humour, as when in "On Viewing Herself in a Glass," she asks "Was Nature angry when she formed my clay?/Or, urged by haste to finish, could not stay?" (ll. 1—2).

Teft's poems have been anthologized in Eighteenth-century women poets: an Oxford anthology (1989) and British women poets of the long eighteenth century (2009). A facsimile of Orinthia's Miscellanies was published in 2013.

== Works ==
- "Orinthia's Request to the Gentlemen of Fortune," Gentleman's Magazine (1741)
- Orinthia's Miscellanies; or, A Compleat Collection of Poems, Never Before Published. By Elizabeth Teft of Lincoln (London, 1747)

== Etexts ==
- Orinthia's Miscellanies; or, A Compleat Collection of Poems, Never Before Published. By Elizabeth Teft of Lincoln (London, 1747) (Open Access at Google Books)
