= Benvenida Cohen Belmonte =

English poet

Benvenida Cohen Belmonte (fl. c. 1720) was a British Jewish poet, who lived in London at the beginning of the eighteenth century.

Her mother Manuela Nuñez de Almeida was a poet before her, as was her brother, Mordecai Nuñez de Almeyda. She was among those who sang the praise of Daniel Israel López Laguna's Espejo fiel de vidas (London, 1720). She also wrote a panegyric poem in honour of Captain Samuel Nassy of Suriname.
