= Roger Lonsdale =

British writer (1934–2022)

Roger Harrison Lonsdale DPhil, FBA, FRSL (6 August 1934 – 28 February 2022) was a British literary scholar and academic born in Hornsea, East Riding of Yorkshire, and educated at Hymers College, Hull (1945–1952). He was a Fellow and Tutor at Balliol College Oxford from 1963 to 2000, and Professor of English Literature at the University of Oxford from 1992 to 2000. He was elected a Fellow of the Royal Society of Literature in 1989 and a Fellow of the British Academy in 1991. Lonsdale died at home in Oxford on 28 February 2022, at the age of 87. He was married to the archaeologist Nicoletta Momigliano.

== Bibliography ==
- Dr Charles Burney: A literary Biography (Clarendon Press, 1965)
- Editor. The Poems of Gray, Collins and Goldsmith (Longmans, Green and Company, 1969)
- Editor. William Beckford's Vathek (OUP, 1970)
- Editor. History of literature in the English language. 4: the Augustans. (Barrie and Jenkins, 1970–75)
- Editor. Dryden to Johnson. (Barrie and Jenkins, 1971)
- Editor. The New Oxford Book of Eighteenth Century Verse (OUP, 1984)
- Editor. Eighteenth century women poets: an Oxford anthology (OUP, 1989)
- Editor. The Lives of Most Eminent English Poets by Samuel Johnson (OUP, 2006)
