= Ellen Taylor =

Irish author

- Occupations: servant, schoolteacher, poet
- Writing career
- Language: English
- Years active: 1792
- Notable works: Poems by Ellen Taylor, the Irish Cottager (1792)

Ellen Taylor (fl. 1792) was an Irish author notable for being the only known example of a rural labouring-class Irish poet writing in English in this period.

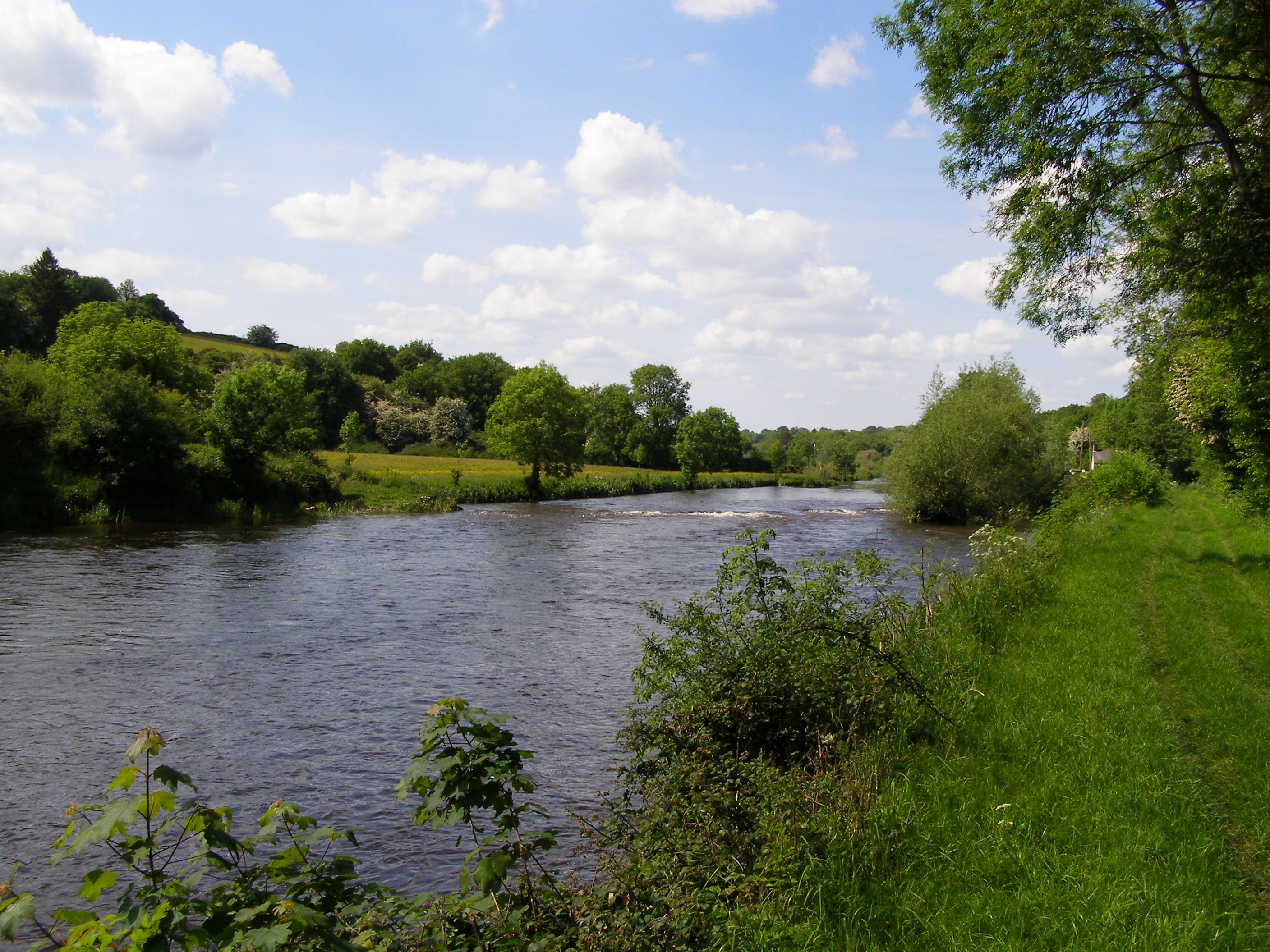
River Barrow, 2006.

== Life ==
According to the anonymous editor of her poems, Taylor's father was an "indigent cottager," in Queen’s County (now County Laois) in the north-west part of Ireland and the source of the River Barrow, referred to in her poem "Written by the Barrow side." Another poem laments a late brother. From the title of her "To a Gentleman who had lent her some books," it can be inferred that she was an autodidact whose access to education was dependent upon the goodwill of others: the "gentleman" addressed in the poem who introduced her to the writing of Milton was apparently a house guest of her then-employer. In "Written by the Barrow side, where she was sent to wash Linen," the poet laments that in having to endure "Servitude" (l. 7) but having learnt "the pleasing sense" (l. 30) from reading, she lives in the worst of both worlds. Of books, the poet writes:

I can but from them learn to know
What misery's complete,
And feel more sensibly each blow
Dealt by relentless fate. (ll. 13—16)

At one time Taylor worked as a servant, though she had been dismissed from that position and was running a small school by 1792. According to her editor, she lived in "extreme poverty." Little else is known of her life.

== Writing ==
Taylor published some of her poetry in newspapers though the collection for which she is known was arranged by an anonymous editor, according to them without her knowledge, in an effort to "assist Genius when sinking under poverty and distress." Poems was published by George Draper in Dublin in 1792, and while the list of subscribers contained only forty names, among them were "two countesses, three viscountesses, an archbishop and the Solicitor General. The remainder are almost exclusively members of the Dublin gentry."

Her work has been anthologized in Eighteenth century women poets (1989), Eighteenth-Century English Labouring-Class Poets (2003), and Romantic-Era Irish Women Poets in English (2021).

== Works ==
- Poems by Ellen Taylor, the Irish Cottager (Dublin: George Draper, 1792)

== See also ==
- List of 18th-century British working-class writers
