= Rebekah Carmichael =

- Born: 1766?
- Died: 1823 Edinburgh
- Occupation: poet
- Period: 1790–1806

Rebekah Carmichael, also spelled Rebecca, later Hay (1766?–1823) was a British poet. Most of her works are sonnets and short lyrical poems.

== Biography ==
Rebekah Carmichael was most likely born in London, to James and Sarah Carmichael and was baptized at the church of St. Martin-in-the-Fields on 24 May 1766, although according to some sources, she may have been born and raised in Edinburgh, Scotland. If she was born in London, her reason of her moving to Scotland is unknown. Her parents died when she was young. In 1793, she married John Hay in Edinburgh, with whom she had four children, including the well-regarded artist and writer David Ramsay Hay.

As a published writer, she was active in the years 1790–1806. Much of her poetry work contains themes of love, loss, and beauty. She appears to have had significant connections in Scotland; in 1787, Robert Burns gave her a book of poetry by Robert Fergusson, in which he wrote: "This copy of Ferguson's Poems is presented as a mark of esteem, friendship, and regard to Miss R. Carmichael, poetess". In 1790, she published in Edinburgh a collection of her works under the title Poems, signed with her birth name of Carmichael. The book was dedicated to David Stuart Moncreiff and was published by subscription; Burns was among the recipients. The topics of the poems were varied, ranging from love to musings on nature. One of her subscribers includes physician to King George II, Dr Carmichael Smyth of London.

In 1806, she published in a single sheet "Extempore, on seeing Sir William Forbes's Funeral" under her married name.

Records show that Carmichael became severely impoverished when her husband, John Hay, died in 1806. A letter attached to her poem "Extempore, on Seeing Sir William Forbes Funeral" addressed to Archibald Constable begs him for a loan. She died in 1823 due to an unknown accident and is buried at Canongate, a street in Edinburgh.

Her poetry was included in such anthologies as Eighteenth Century Women Poets: An Oxford Anthology (1989) and Scottish Poetry, 1730-1830 (2023).

Carmichael's poetry style is similar to those of many other romantic poets of the era. She was influenced by poet Anna Laetitia Barbauld, who promoted exploring personal feelings in literature. Carmichael incorporates vivid imagery and sincerity in her poetry.
