= Mary Locke (writer) =

Mary Locke, later Mary Mister, (1768 – 1816) was an English poet and children's author. She was orphaned as a child and brought up by her educated uncle Edward Taylor in the Oxfordshire countryside.

She published subjective and melancholic verses in the Gentleman's Magazine from 1791, with twenty items appearing up to 1796. On the death of her uncle in 1797 she appeared to stop writing altogether. She inherited substantial property from him at Steeple Ashton in Wiltshire, and at Middle Barton.

In 1808, she married a Welshman, William Mister. She then published under her married name a series of children's books. Mary Mister was long believed to be a separate author until historic research revealed the two to be the same person in 1989.
