= Hannah Brand =

English actress, poet and playwright

Hannah Brand (1754–1821) was an English actress, poet and playwright. After a brief theatrical career, she became a governess.

== Life ==
Hannah Brand was born in Norwich, where she ran a "young Ladies Boarding School, No. 18, St. Giles's Broad-street" with her sister, Mary, until she turned to the stage. At the Miss Brands' Academy for Young Ladies, day and boarding students were taught English, needlework, writing, arithmetic, drawing, music, dancing and French. Her historical tragedy Huniades, or, The siege of Belgrave, was first produced in John Brunton's Theatre-Royal, Norwich in April 1791 and performed on at least three nights and was, according to the Norwich Mercury, "well received" by "a genteel audience".

Brand was due to appear at the Haymarket on 14 January, but did not on account of a sudden indisposition. A subsequent performance by the Drury-Lane company at the Haymarket on 19 January 1792, however, in which she appeared (despite a cold) as the heroine, was not successful. The play was performed again the next evening. She shortened the play, retitled it Agmunda after her character, and remounted it the following month; it enjoyed a small success. She then left London to pursue a middling acting career in the provinces. It was reported, 'On 29 March 1792 in The Battle of Hexham the part of Queen Margaret was attempted by local playwright Hannah Brand at Norwich. On 28 May for her benefit night in Norwich, she portrayed Euphrasia to Brunton's Evander in The Grecian Daughter. On 31 July she appeared as Alicia in Jane Shore in Norwich. She performed in Agimunda in Yorkshire on 21 May 1794.

An invitation for subscribers was published:

BETHEL-STREET, NORWICH, APRIL 9, 1796. This Day were Published, PROPOSALS for Publishing by Subscription, one Volume, in Octavo, of PLAYS and POEMS, by Miss HANNAH BRAND. ' CONDITIONS. This work will be printed woven paper, made on purpose, and .with an entire new type, cast by Fry. The price to subscribers will be Six Shillings, in boards the money to be paid at the time subscription;. After the subscription is closed the Price will be Seven Shilling. The volume will contain HUNIADES or, the SIEGE of BELGRADE, a Tragedy. THE CONFLICT; or, LOVE, HONOUR, and PRIDE, a Heroic Comedy. ADELINDA, a Comedy.. AND various Poems. The work is ready for the press, and will be published as soon as a sufficient number of subscribers is obtained. Miss H. BRAND most respectfully entreats those who intend to honour her with their patronage, to favour her with their names as soon as possible, that the subscription may closed, and the book sent to the press. The names of the subscribers will printed.

This volume of Plays, and Poems (Norwich: Beatniffe and Payne) was published in 1798; she included Huniades and adaptations of works by Corneille and Destouches, respectively: The conflict, or, Love, honour, and pride a heroic comedy and Adelinda, a comedy. Neither were performed.

She subsequently gave up the stage and became a governess to a family in Woodbridge, though her arrival triggered "much unpleasantness between husband and wife".

== Poem ==
"Ode To Youth"

Sweet Morn of Life! all hail, ye hours ease!
When blooms the cheek with roseate, varying dyes;
When modest grace exerts each power to please,
And Streaming lustre radiates in the eyes.
Thy past hours innocent, thy present gay,
Thy future, halcyon Hope depicts without allay.
Day spring of life! oh, stay thy fleeting hours!
Thou fairy reign of ev'ry pleasant thought!
Fancy, to cheer thy path, strews all her flowers,
And in her loom thy plan of years is wrought.
By thee for goodness each heart caress'd.
The world, untried, judg'd by that within thy breast.
Sweet state of Youth! O harmony of foul!
Now chearful dawns the day, noon brightly beams,
And evening comes serene, nor cares controul,
And night approaches with soft infant dreams
Circling, the morn beholds th' accustom'd round,
Life's smiling charities awake and joys abound.
From Poems by Miss Hannah Brand. Published in The Scots Magazine – September 1799.

== Death ==
When she died, she left small bequests to family members and the bulk of her estate, £200, to Mary Ware, a widow.

== Bibliography ==
- British Women Playwrights Around 1800
- Chandler, David. "'The Conflict': Hannah Brand and Theatre Politics in the 1790s." Romanticism On the Net 12 (November 1998) [22 December 2006].
- Knight, Joseph. "Brand, Hannah (1754–1821)." Rev. K. A. Crouch. Oxford Dictionary of National Biography. Ed. H. C. G. Matthew and Brian Harrison. Oxford: OUP, 2004. 21 November 2006.
