= Jael Pye =

18th-century English writer

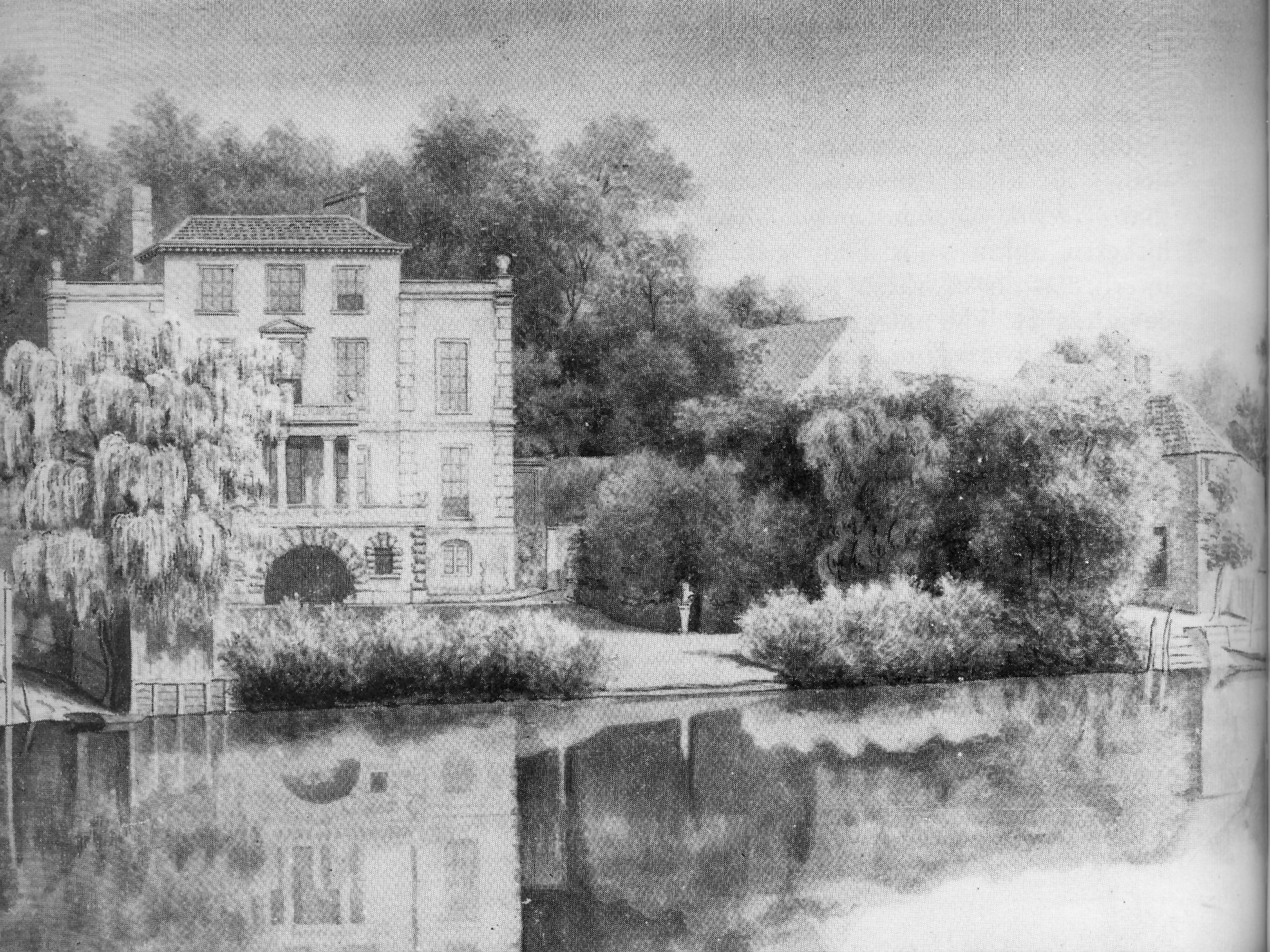
Pope's villa, described in Pye's Short Account.

Jael Henrietta Pye (Note: Sometimes rendered 'Joel' or 'Joel-Henrietta'.) (c. 1737 – 1782), born Jael Mendez, was an English writer. She is known to have authored four works, all of different genres: a piece of garden writing, a collection of poetry, a play, and a two-volume novel. She is perhaps best known for A Short Account, of the Principal Seats and Gardens, in and about Twickenham (1760), an account of the Twickenham homes of various Georgian eminences.

== Life ==
Her father was a merchant and lived in Red Lion Square, Holborn, London. Weintraub reports that his name was Solomon Mendes (or Mendez), a 'wealthy and literary-minded businessman known to the Disraelis'. Her first husband, John Neil Campbell, was a lawyer. In 1766, she married her second husband, Robert Hampden Pye, whose father—Henry Pye (not to be confused with Henry James Pye, Robert's brother)—was an MP for Faringdon, then part of Berkshire.

Pye was born Jewish, although a letter of Horace Walpole suggests that she later converted to some form of Christianity. Hodes states that 'Mendez identifies a Jewish family of Portuguese or Spanish origins'.

She was a correspondent of David Garrick and an acquaintance of Marie Jeanne Riccoboni.

Pye lived in France from 1774 to at least 1779. On 9 November 1774, she paid a visit to Voltaire in Paris. She died in France.

== Writing ==
In her Short Account (1760), Pye describes the homes and gardens of notable Twickenhamites including Hannah Pritchard, Kitty Clive, Horace Walpole, Alexander Pope, and others. She observes critically that visits to Twickenham were 'commonly the only travels permitted to our sex, and the only way we have of becoming at all acquainted with the progress of the arts'. Walpole disparaged the book in a letter to William Cole, calling it a 'silly little book' and referring to Pye derisively as a 'Jewess'.

Garrick produced her play A Capricious Lady, described as a 'farce', in 1771. It was not subsequently published.

Mandal describes her Theodosius and Arabella (published posthumously in 1786) as a 'sentimental novel'.

== Works ==
- A Short Account, of the Principal Seats and Gardens, in and about Twickenham (1760). Later titled A Peep into the Principal Seats and Gardens at and about Twickenham (1775).
- Poems, by a Lady (1767). Later Poems, by Mrs. Hamden Pye (1772).
- A Capricious Lady (play, c. 1771).
- Theodosius and Arabella (novel, 2 volumes, 1786). Published posthumously.
