= Manuela Nuñez de Almeida =

British Jewish poet

Manuela Nuñez de Almeida was an eighteenth-century British Jewish poet.

== Biography ==
She was born in London into a family of Sephardic origin. She was the matriarch of a learned family, whose members formed part of a literary circle surrounding Haham David Nieto. Her son Mordecai Nuñez de Almeida was the patron of the Spanish poet Daniel Israel López Laguna. Together with her two daughters, Benvenida Cohen Belmonte and Sara de Fonseca Pina y Pimentel, wife of Manuel Fonseca Pina, she wrote Spanish verses prefacing Laguna's work.
