= Maria Barrell =

Writer, poet and playwright

- Born: Maria Weylar
- Died: 1803; Newgate Prison
- Known for: Poet; Playwright
- Notable work: British Liberty Vindicated; The Captive
- Criminal charges: Debt; Passing bad coin
- Spouses: Theodore Barrell; James Makitterick Adair

Maria Barrell née Weylar (died 1803) was a poet, playwright and writer of periodicals. Whilst confined in debtors' prison she wrote about the plight of bankruptcy and campaigned to Parliament for legislative reform. Having faced financial issues for much of her life, she died in Newgate Prison awaiting deportation to Australia.

== Biography ==
Maria Barrell claimed to have been born in the West Indies but appears to have spent her early life in England. She moved to Grenada in 1763 and ten years later married Theodore Barrell. Together they had a son, William, and a daughter, whose name is unknown. In 1777, Maria and Theodore were in America and were accused of having loyalist sympathies during the American Revolutionary War. They were forced to separate when Maria was allowed to leave Boston to see her daughter in England, but was not allowed to return.

In 1782, Barrell was living in London. Whilst in the city, she contributed to periodicals as 'Maria'.

Barrell was imprisoned for debt in the 1780s. She submitted compensation claims in 1784 and 1790 for losses due to the American War, but these were unsuccessful.

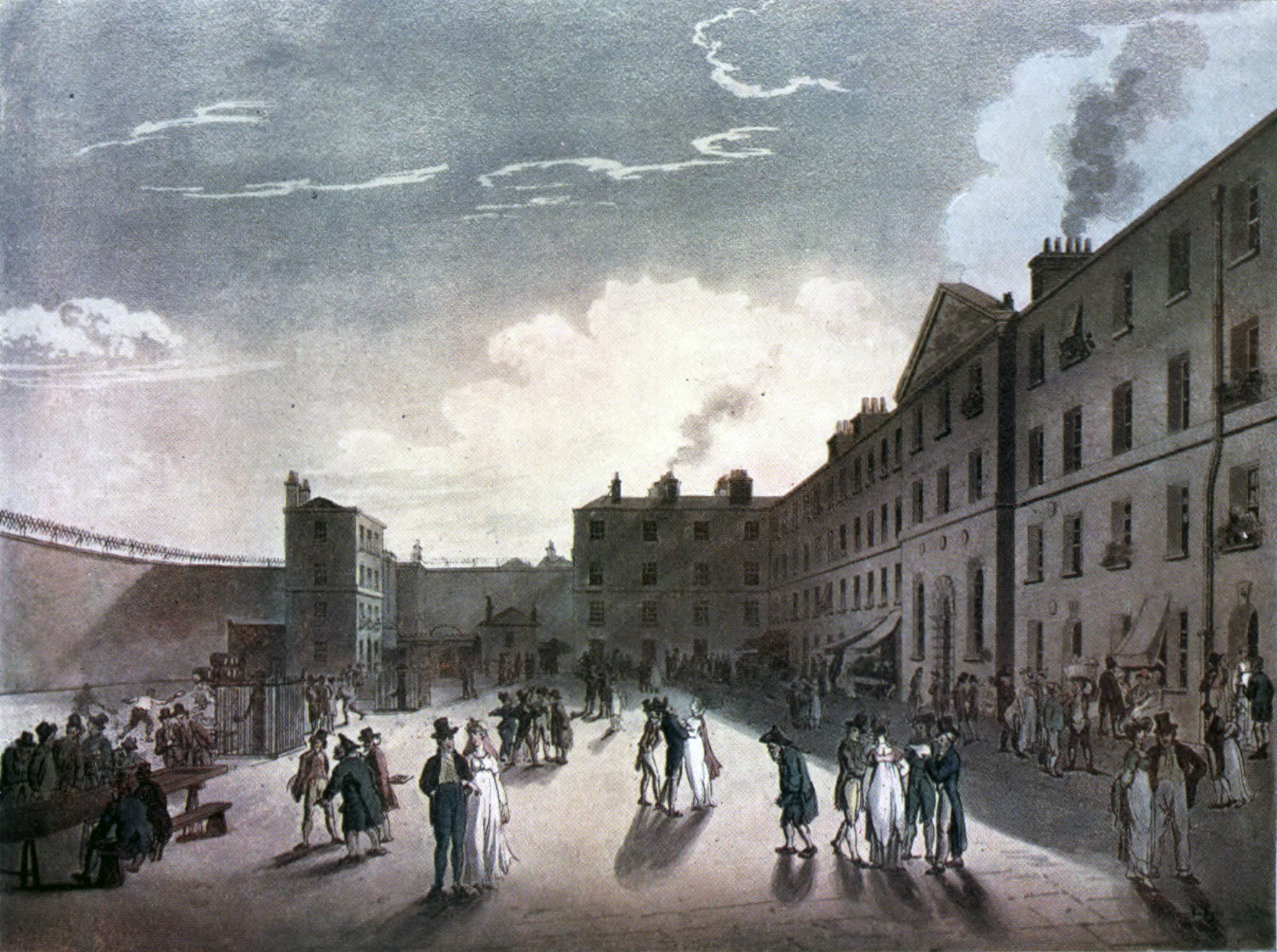
King's Bench Prison

British Liberty Vindicated is a prose tract written in 1788 whilst Barrell was a prisoner in the King's Bench. In an introduction preceding the poem she describes herself as an "unfortunate loyalist" facing "perpetual imprisonment". The poem praises British liberty but appeals to the right of debtors and explores the futility of imprisoning them.

Barrell's play The Captive was written in 1790 and is dedicated to the Prince of Wales. Her address was again given as the Kings Bench, and in the preface she states that she is writing from "the gloomy walls of a prison". Barrell compares the Storming of the Bastille to how she feels like a captive in her own country. She encourages readers to petition Parliament for reform so that debtors can work to repay their debt. She also condemns long-term imprisonment, claiming a person will find it hard to work after such a confinement. The plot focusses on a soldier starving to death in prison and his wife on the outside who cannot help. The play explores how bankruptcy is treated as the worst of crimes, despite it arising from bad luck. The play was never performed, but it demonstrates how play-writing was a potential method of income for women in desperate need of money, or as a way to attract a patron.

Barrell married James Makitterick Adair in 1791, but the marriage was short-lived and Adair remarried the following year. In 1801, Barrell was convicted of passing counterfeit coin in Fleet Street and was sentenced to one year in prison. She was convicted of counterfeit again in 1803 and faced the death penalty, but received a royal pardon. Her punishment was reduced to transportation to New South Wales. Barrell died in Newgate Prison before she could leave.

== Works ==
- Reveries du Coeur: Or, Feelings of the Heart. Attempted in Verse (1770)
- British Liberty Vindicated; or, a Delineation of the King's Bench (1788)
- The Captive (1790)
