= Mary Chandler =

British writer

Mary Chandler (1687–1745) was an English poet. George Crabb writes that she left several poems, "the most esteemed of which was her Bath."

== Life ==
Born at Malmesbury, Wiltshire, she was the eldest daughter of Henry Chandler, a dissenting minister, later at Bath, Somerset. Her mother was a Miss Bridgman of Marlborough, and Samuel Chandler was one of her brothers. In her youth her spine became crooked, and her health suffered, but she set up a milliners shop in Bath about 1705, when not yet out of her teens, and wrote rhyming riddles and poems to friends. Despite her deformity and class station, she was on familiar terms with a variety of Bath society, among them Mrs. Boteler, Mrs. Moor, Lady Russell, and the Duchess of Somerset. Jonathan Swift's friend Mary Barber was her neighbour, and she was also a friend of Elizabeth Rowe and Frances Seymour, Countess of Hertford. Alexander Pope knew of and praised her poetry. She died on 11 September 1745.

== Works ==
The first edition of her most famous work, A Description of Bath (1733), was described as 'a letter to a friend' and dedicated to her physician, Dr Oliver. The second edition appeared the following year, newly inscribed to the Princess Amelia, with the original panegyric verses on Dr Oliver excised and replaced. The loss was made good in the third edition, issued in 1736, which included a poem 'To Doctor Oliver, who corrected my Bath poem'. A fourth edition followed in 1738, and a fifth in 1741. A wealthy gentleman, of sixty, struck with one of her poems, travelled eighty miles to see her, and, after buying a pair of gloves from her, offered to make her his wife. Miss Chandler turned the incident into verse, and a sixth edition of her book being called for in 1744, it appeared with a sub-title, ‘To which is added a True Tale, by the same Author.’ After her retirement from business, she began a poem ‘On the Attributes of God,’ but left it unfinished at her death.

A seventh edition of her poems was issued in 1755, and an eighth in 1767. She dedicated her book to her brother John, and her 'Life', in Theophilus Cibber's Lives of the Poets, was written by her brother Samuel.
