= Margaret Harvey =

English poet and scholar

- Born: 1768; Newcastle upon Tyne, England
- Died: 18 June 1858 (aged 89–90); Bishopwearmouth, England
- Citizenship: United Kingdom
- Occupations: Writer; Poet; Playwright
- Writing career
- Language: English

Margaret Harvey (1768–1858) was an English poet and scholar from Newcastle, England. Her father was a surgeon from nearby Sunderland; however, she did not live with him. Harvey was known to have a "remarkable energy of character" through both her writing and overall being. She is most known for her poetry, although she did write plays as well. Harvey died on 18 June 1858 at 27 Villiers Street in Bishop Wearmouth.

== Early life ==
Harvey was born in Newcastle-on-Tyne and lived with their aunt, Miss Ilderton and two sisters, Ann and Jane. After her aunt's death in 1812, Harvey and her sisters all moved to a house at the White Cross in the same city. During this time, it is "likely" that Harvey attended Dame Allan’s School where she "developed her interest in local history, intensified, undoubtedly, by the presence of the nearby bona fide Gothic castle." Around the age of 36 Harvey wrote her first poem. Soon after, Harvey decided to move away from her sisters because she realized she needed to be on her own. Once she moved to New Castle, Harvey became the headmistress of a local girl's boarding school. It was here that Harvey adopted conservative values that would later be seen in her writing.

== Major works ==
Harvey began writing poetry at age 36. Her first major piece, The Lay of the Minstrel's Daughter, was published in Newcastle in the year 1814. This poem is made of six cantos, which were based on the history of the Percy family and Alnwick Castle and it was dedicated to Hugh Percy, 2nd Duke of Northumberland. She then published another poem titled Monody on the Princess in 1818. In terms of her most well-known play, Harvey based this on her most famous poem, The Lay of the Minstrel's Daughter, and the history of England to create her melodramatic piece, Raymond de Percy,. This melodrama was also known as The Tenant of the Tomb and it was published in April 1822 in Sunderland, where it was claimed to be the first "historical Gothic Melodrama" to be performed that was written by a woman. This melodrama was written in verse and prose. In the play, the villain of the story desires the hero's loved one and he is tormented by a certain ghost from a tomb. This play is written in a conservative, traditional way that emphasizes a woman's inability to act "without the assistance of a man."

Her major works include:

- The Lay of the Minstrel's Daughter
- Monody on the Princess
- Raymond de Percy
- The Grave of Hope: An Elegy
- Sensibility, the Stranger, and other poems

== See also ==
- Susanna Hawkins, 19th-century English woman poet
- Mary Linskill, 19th-century English woman poet, novelist and short-story writer
