= Arabella Moreton =

British poet

Arabella Moreton (after 1690 – 1727) was a British poet. Moreton was the daughter of Matthew Ducie Moreton who was the MP for Gloucestershire between 1708 and 1713, and between 1715 and 1720. She died unmarried in May 1727.

Moreton's poem A Humble Wish appeared in several of the anthologies of polite verse that were popular in the 18th century. It was printed in A New Miscellany under the name "B-ll M-rt-m". After her death, it appeared anonymously in Cowper's Norfolk Poetical Miscellany. It is included in Roger Lonsdale's 1989 anthology Eighteenth-Century Women Poets.
