= Maria and Harriet Falconar =

Teenage English or Scottish sisters jointly publishing poems

- Born: 1771 (Maria); 1774 (Harriet)
- Occupation: Poets
- Genre: Poetry, social commentary
- Notable works: Poems (1788); Poems on Slavery (1788); Poetic Laurels (1791)

Maria and Harriet Falconar were English or Scottish sisters who published joint collections of poems while in their teens in the late 1780s. They then disappeared from the historical record and little is known of their origins or later lives.

== Lives and authorship ==
Maria Falconar is stated to have been born in 1771 and Harriet in 1774. They may have been the daughters of Magnus Falconar, who published medical texts in the 1780s. Maria appeared in print first with two poems published in the European Magazine and London Review in 1786. Another possibility is that they were the children of the Scottish poet William Falconer (1732–1769) and his wife Jane, née Hicks. However, such a date for their father's death and the wording of the "condescending, laudatory introduction" would question their declared ages of 16 and 14. Furthermore, they were living in London.

The sisters' joint volume of Poems appeared in 1788. The subscribers to the volume were headed by the Duke of Northumberland and included two Falconer names based in Nairn and Inverness. Elizabeth Carter, Catharine Macaulay and Helen Maria Williams were also among them. The poems were on such themes as Remorse and Fancy.

Another volume about the ethics of slavery entitled, On Slavery, followed in the same year. This survives in the British Library. They were ostensibly 17 and 14 at the time of its publication. The publisher was Egertons, Murray, and Johnson, of Whitehall, London.

In 1791, aged 20 and 17, they authored a volume called Poetic Laurels, addressed to the Prince of Wales (later George IV of the United Kingdom). The content of this suggests they were preparing for marriage and were aware it might limit their freedom to write. It is thought possible that they continued to write under their married names and future research may reveal more work by them.

== Bibliography ==
- Maria and Harriet Falconar: Poems (1788)
- Maria and Harriet Falconar: Poems on Slavery (1788) text held in The British Library, shelfmark: 1164.e.23
- Maria and Harriet Falconar: Poetic Laurels (1791)
