= Anne Francis (author) =

English scholar and poet (1738–1800)

Anne Francis, née Gittins (1738 – 7 November 1800) was an English classical scholar and poet. She is notable for a poetic translation of the Bible's Song of Songs that focuses on the dramatic action of the song, rather than its Christian allegorical interpretation.

== Biography ==
Anne Gittins was born in 1738 as the daughter of the Rev. Daniel Gittins, rector of South Stoke, near Arundel, Sussex. She was educated by her father in the classics and Hebrew. She married the Rev. Robert Bransby Francis, rector of Edgefield, near Holt, Norfolk.

Though she lacked formal classical training, Anne Francis was in contact with the leading Old Testament scholars of the time: her Poetical Translation of the Song of Songs was dedicated to John Parkhurst, and other subscribers included Robert Lowth and Benjamin Kennicott. The Poetical Translation focused on what she saw as the direct dramatic action of the song, rather than its Christian allegorical interpretation. Taking a cue from Thomas Harmer, Francis distinguished the voice of an "Egyptian Spouse" from that of a "Jewish Queen": in this love triangle, Solomon's marriage to the daughter of Pharaoh being resented by an earlier wife.

Francis's translation has not received much continuing attention. Yet in the verdict of one recent commentator, Francis's "insistence on bringing together learning and feeling, what she knew as male and female worlds, makes her Song of Songs an outstanding feminist monument."

In 1787, Francis changed publishers to raise her voice in response to Goethe's "Charlotte to Werther. A Poetical Epistle". Throughout the 1790s, she further strengthened the reactionary side of the political divide by periodically publishing work.

Despite Francis's lack of formal education, she aided in efforts to adapt French and German playscripts, as did various other female writers.

Anne Francis died on 7 November 1800, at the age of 62.

== Selected works ==
- A Poetical Translation of the Song of Solomon from the original Hebrew, with a preliminary Discourse and Notes, historical and explanatory, 1781, 4to.
- The Obsequies of Demetrius Poliorcetes: a Poem, 1785, 4to.
- A Poetical Epistle from Charlotte to Werther, 1788, 4to.
- Miscellaneous Poems, 1790, 12mo.
