= Octavia Walsh =

English poet

- Born: c. 1676; Worcestershire
- Died: 1706; Worcestershire
- Occupation: noblewoman
- Writing career
- Genre: poetry

Octavia Walsh (1676? – 1706) was an English poet. Her book of poetry is in the Bodleian Library.

== Life ==
Walsh was the last of eight children born to Joseph and Elizabeth Walsh of Abberley Hall. She was christened Octavia on New Years Day 1677. Her parents' second child, her elder brother William Walsh would be a poet.

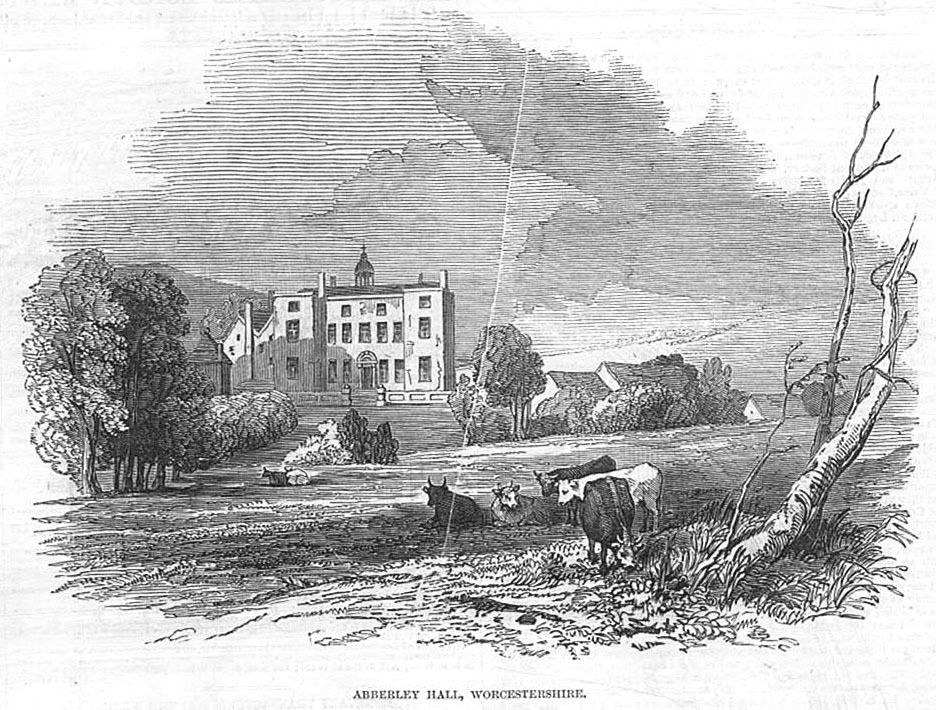
Abberley Hall in 1846

Her brother attended Oxford University but without result. It is supposed that Walsh never went outside her county and she had to rely on her brother for access to other poets. The book that creates her reputation is bound in vellum and it has 165 pages. Walsh had written from one end and then reversed the book and she then wrote from that end. The book is mostly poetry but it does have some recipes. A portrait of her seems to have been stuck in and annotated by another hand. Versions of two of the poems were published by her brother in 1721 and are presumably by him.

Walsh died of smallpox in 1706 and it would appear that her book and one poem in particular, The Princely Persian lead his warlike Host, were left unfinished by her illness. She has a memorial tablet in Worcester Cathedral. Her poetry was not published in her lifetime. The first is in a book by a bishop.
