= Anne Penny =

British poet and translator

- Born: Anne Hughes; 6 January 1729; Bangor, Wales
- Died: 17 March 1784 (aged 55); Bagshot, England
- Occupations: Poet, translator
- Spouses: Thomas Christian (1746–51); Peter Penny (1750s–1779)
- Children: Hugh Cloberry Christian
- Writing career
- Language: English; Welsh
- Notable work: An Invocation to the Genius of Britain

Anne Penny (née Hughes; 6 January 1729 – 17 March 1784) was a British poet and translator, born in Wales to a vicar and his wife. She married a privateer who owned an estate in Oxford, but was left widowed at the age of 22 with a son, Hugh Cloberry Christian. She then started writing poetry. She married a French customs officer, again with a maritime history, and the couple moved to London. There she published a number of works, including her most significant poem An Invocation to the Genius of Britain, a patriotic piece written at the start of the Anglo-French War. She also published a number of translations of Welsh poems.

Penny was an adherent of Welsh nationalism, and wrote a number of nationalistic poems. Though her work was criticised for its poor grammar, it attracted prominent subscribers, such as Samuel Johnson and Horace Walpole.

== Biography ==
Penny was born Anne Hughes in Bangor and baptised on 6 January 1729. Her father was Bulkeley Hughes, the vicar of Edern and previously the vicar of Bangor, and her mother was Mary Hughes. She married Thomas Christian in 1746, a privateer captain with a letter of marque. Christian had captured several Spanish galleons, allowing him to purchase an estate at Hook Norton in Oxfordshire. In 1747 the couple had a son, Hugh Cloberry Christian, who went on to follow his father's maritime traditions and became a rear admiral in the Royal Navy.

Thomas Christian died in 1751, leaving Penny widowed at the age of twenty-two. She turned to writing and published her first work, Cambridge: a poem in 1756, which she published under the name Ann Christian. She married Peter Penny (or Penné), a French customs officer who had lost his leg whilst in the navy. The couple moved into a house in Bloomsbury Square, where Penny carried on her writing and translating poetry. She learned Welsh as child and it may have been her first language. Peter Penny died around 1779, so Penny published her works to raise money. Anne Penny died in London on 17 March 1784.

== Poetry ==
Penny's most important poem was An Invocation to the Genius of Britain (1778), written in rhyming couplets and dedicated to the Duchess of Devonshire. Composed at the start of the Anglo-French War, it defends imperialism and glorifies the Royal Navy.

Penny also maintained an interest in Thomas Gray's Celtic work. Her collection Poems, with a Dramatic Entertainment (1771) includes a number of nationalistic poems about Wales, as well as translations of Taliesin's Poem to Prince Elphin and An Elegy on Neest by Evan Evans.

Although Penny's work was criticized for poor grammar, often linked by commentators to her social standing, it was subscribed to by Samuel Johnson, the Duchess of Bedford, the Duke and Duchess of Marlborough, and Horace Walpole. She was also commissioned to write poems by the Marine Society.
