= Elizabeth Tollet =

Elizabeth Tollett (March 11, 1694 – February 1, 1754) was a British poet. Her surviving works are varied; she produced translations of classical themes, religious and philosophical poetry and poems arguing for women's involvement in education and intellectual pursuits such as natural philosophy. Unusually, for a woman of her time, her poetry also includes Newtonian imagery and ideas. Some of her poetry imitates the Latin verse of Horace, Ovid, and Virgil. In some of her poems, Tollett paraphrases the Psalms.

She was the daughter of George Tollett who, observing her intelligence, gave her a thorough education in languages, history, poetry and mathematics. Tollett was fluent in Italian, and French and she achieved a proficiency in Latin that was unconventional for women of her time. The Tolletts' social circle included Isaac Newton, who also encouraged her to pursue her education.

Tollett grew up in the Tower of London where her father lived as a commissioner of the British Navy. She refers to the Tower in several of her poems and expresses her confinement and frustration with it. Tollett remained unmarried her whole life. Her mother likely died while she was young and Tollett, being the eldest daughter, would have been expected to stay at home and care for her siblings.

In 1724 she published Poems on Several Occasions, which included her Hypatia, now seen as a feminist protest poem.

On Newton's death in 1727 Tollett produced an elegy, On the Death of Sir Isaac Newton.

She died in 1754 in the village of Westham, Essex (now known as West Ham) and is buried at All Saints church there.
