= Christian Carstairs =

British author

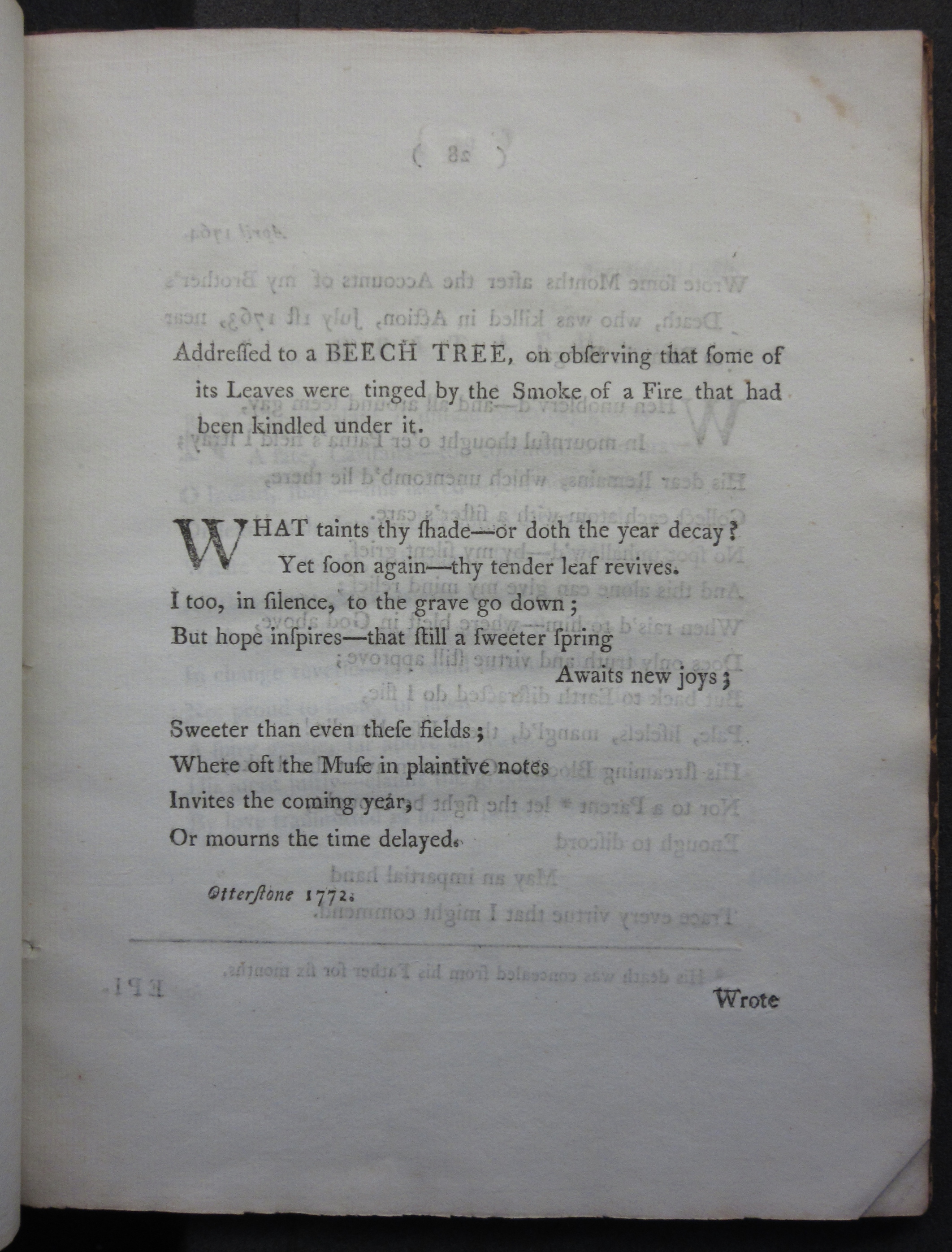
- "Addressed to a Beech Tree" by Christian Carstairs. Original Poems. By a Lady. Edinburgh, 1786.
- Occupations: governess; author
- Relatives: James Bruce Carstairs (father)
- Writing career
- Pen name: "a Lady"
- Language: English
- Years active: 1763—1786
- Notable work: Original Poems. By a Lady

Christian Carstairs (fl. 1763—1786) was a Scottish poet who published anonymously.

== Biography ==
Christian Carstairs was the daughter of James Bruce Carstairs (died 1768) of Kinross, Fife. The little that is known about her life may be found in her writing. One poem indicates she had a brother who died in military action in Bengal. Various of her poems are dated and refer to places in Scotland. She likely worked as a governess, and may also have sought to open a school for milliners. It has been speculated that she was a Mrs Grizel Carstairs who died in 1794.

== Writing ==
Carstairs's collection of poetry, Original Poems. By a Lady, Dedicated to Miss Ann Henderson. A Tribute to Gratitude and Friendship, was published anonymously by subscription in Edinburgh in 1786. At ninety-six names the subscription list was small, but nearly a quarter of them were aristocratic or otherwise well-connected. In addition to the poetry collection, her other known publication was a short theatrical, The Hubble-Shue, "an inconsequential farce of obscure purpose" that has generally bemused critics, though it was anthologized in Plays by Scots 1660-1800 (1974). Pamela Perkins has argued that Carstairs's work is of more historical than literary interest:

Carstairs, with striking enthusiasm, wrote on just about every fashionable topic of the day, and her volume of poems is an index of the literary tastes of her era. As a result, the volume's contents — and perhaps even the simple fact of its publication — give some insights into women's place in the late eighteenth-century Scottish literary world.

== Works ==
- Original Poems. By a Lady, Dedicated to Miss Ann Henderson. A Tribute to Gratitude and Friendship. Edinburgh: Andrew Shortrede, 1786.
- The Hubble-Shue. Preface by James Maidment. Edinburgh, 1833.

== Etexts ==
- "Christian Carstairs." Eighteenth-century Poetry Archive.
- The Hubble-Shue. Preface by James Maidment. Edinburgh, 1833. Full text at Project Gutenberg.
