= Mary Latter =

English poet, essayist and playwright

- Born: 1725; Henley-on-Thames
- Died: 28 March 1777 (aged 51–52); Reading
- Writing career
- Period: 1740-1771

Mary Latter (1725 – 28 March 1777) was an English poet, essayist and playwright of the 18th century.

== Biography ==
Mary Latter, the daughter of a country attorney, was born at Henley-on-Thames in 1725. She settled in Reading, Berkshire, where her mother, a milliner, died in 1748.

Her income was quite low, and she indulged a propensity for witty and satiric poetry, winning at least one comparison with Swift. Among her early attempts were some verses which were descriptive of the persons and characters of several ladies in Reading, which she thought was proper to disown in a rhymed advertisement inserted in the Reading Mercury, 17 November 1740. In 1759, she published, by subscription – The Miscellaneous Works, in Prose and Verse, of Mrs. Mary Latter, in three parts, consisting respectively of epistolary correspondence, poems, and soliloquies, and (part iii.) a sort of prose poem, prompted by a perusal of Edward Young's Night Thoughts, and entitled A Retrospective View of Indigence, or the Danger of Spiritual Poverty. A short appendix deals with temporal poverty, and describes the writer as a resident who is "not very far from the market-place, immersed in business and in debt; sometimes madly hoping to gain a competency; sometimes justly fearing dungeons and distress". The work is inscribed to Mrs. Loveday – wife of John Loveday, antiquarian of Caversham.

In 1763, she published a tragedy entitled The Siege of Jerusalem by Titus Vespasian, to which was prefixed An Essay on the Mystery and Mischiefs of Stagecraft. The play had previously been accepted by John Rich, the owner of the Theatre Royal at Covent Garden, who took Latter under his protection, desiring her "to remain in his house in order, as he kindly said, that by frequenting the theatre she might improve in the knowledge of it". Rich died before the play could be produced, but it was subsequently performed at Reading (1768) and proved a failure.

She died in Reading on 28 March 1777 and was buried in the churchyard of St. Lawrence in that town. Sage notes, especially, her perseverance in continuing to write despite economic hardship.

== Works ==
In addition to the works noted above, Mrs. Latter wrote:

1. A Miscellaneous Poetical Essay in three parts, 1761, 8vo.
2. A Lyric Ode on the Birth of the Prince of Wales, 1763, 8vo.
3. Liberty and Interest: a Burlesque Poem on the Present Times, London, 1764, 4to
4. Pro and Con, or the Opinionists, an ancient fragment, 1771, 8vo.

== Notes ==
- This article incorporates text from a publication now in the public domain: Seccombe, Thomas (1892). "Latter, Mary". In Lee, Sidney (ed.). Dictionary of National Biography. Vol. 32. London: Smith, Elder & Co.
