= Ann Murry =

English children's educational writer and poet

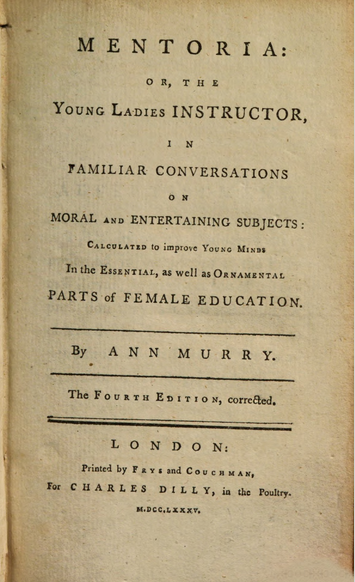
Mentoria was Murry's most popular title, going through 12 editions by 1823

Ann Murry (1750 – after 1818) was an English children's educational writer and poet who discussed geography, grammar, virtue and etiquette, arithmetic, religion, and history.

== Life ==
Ann Murry was born in 1750 in London, to Isaac and Elizabeth Murry, and christened at St. Mary-at-Hill. Her father was a wine merchant who focused on supplying her with a solid education, which she cultivated with natural talent and curiosity. She earned her primary living as a private tutor and teacher and became well-known through Mentoria: or, The Young Ladies Instructor (1778). In 1785, she opened a boarding school for young girls in Hampstead with the involvement of two of her sisters and Charles Dilly, a noted London bookseller. Additionally, many of her books were printed for Dilly and the two were well-acquainted. At some point after the opening of her boarding school, Murry moved on to more private tutoring work, working for famous figures such as Sir William Pulteney's daughter, Laura, and the Princess Royal. Murry continued to be active in teaching and writing through the end of the 18th century and into the 19th. Her date of death is unknown, but her last recorded writing was in 1818, an introduction to An Abridgement of the History of France.

== Career ==
Over her career, Murry wrote six books, mostly for the education of her pupils. Her first and by far most famous book was Mentoria: or, the Young Ladies Instructor, first published in 1778. This book presents itself as a conversation between a teacher, called Mentoria, and her pupils. Murry covers many subjects in this book, including history, grammar, religion, arithmetic, and proper conduct. Before its publication, Murry requested and received the Princess Royal's approval, which she also did with Mentoria's sequel in 1799. Murry was also involved in poetry. She composed a poetry book of her own in 1779 and filled Mentoria with her own poetry and that of other famous poets, including John Milton, James Thomson, and Alexander Pope.

Her works were fairly well-received during her era, with positive reviews of her books frequently appearing in literary journals of the period. Additionally, she had many famous subscribers to her books, including the Duchess of Bedford and David Garrick.

Murry's works strongly displayed her moral and social ideology, especially Mentoria. She supported the American Rebellion, detested the practice of slavery, encouraged virtuous behavior in young ladies, and displayed great amounts of religious devotion. However, she harshly condemned Roman Catholicism, Islam, and Judaism, believing them to be misguided.

== Full list of works ==
- Mentoria: or, the Young Ladies Instructor,1778
- Poems on Various Subjects, 1779.
- A Concise History of the Kingdoms of Israel and Judah, 1783. 2 vols.
- The Sequel to Mentoria; or, the Young Ladies Instructor, 1799.
- Mentorian Lectures on Sacred and Moral Subjects, 1809. 8 vols.
- An Abridgement of the History of France, c. 1815
