= Ann Yearsley =

English poet and writer (1753–1806)

Coordinates: 51.45408°N 2.61448°W

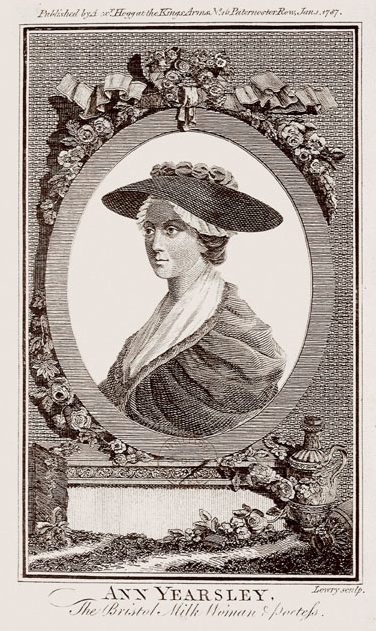
- Ann Yearsley, 1787
- Born: 8 July 1753; Bristol, England
- Died: 6 May 1806 (aged 52); Melksham, England
- Resting place: Clifton, Bristol
- Other name: Lactilla
- Occupations: Milkmaid; Poet
- Years active: 1784–1796
- Known for: Poetry

Ann Yearsley, née Cromartie (8 July 1753 – 6 May 1806), also known as Lactilla, was an English poet and writer from the labouring class, in Bristol. The poet Robert Southey wrote a biography of her.

== Early life ==
Born in Bristol to John and Anne Cromartie, Ann worked in childhood as a milkwoman, like her mother. She received no formal education, but her brother taught her to write. She married John Yearsley, a yeoman, in 1774. A decade later the family was rescued from destitution by the charity of Hannah More and others.

Yearsley was known as "Lactilla", a name given to her by Horace Walpole. She was also referred to as "the poetic milkwoman of Bristol.

Yearsley read John Milton's Paradise Lost and Night Thoughts by Edward Young as part of her informal education; Milton was a significant influence on her work.

Yearsley was among the noted Bristol women to campaign against the Bristol slave trade. In other respects her politics have been described as conservative.

Yearsley's husband died in 1803. She died in 1806 at Melksham near Trowbridge, Wiltshire. Her grave can be found in Birdcage Walk, Clifton, Bristol.

== Writings ==
Hannah More called her first encounter with Yearsley positive, saying her writing "excited [her] attention" as it "breathed the genuine spirit of poetry, and [was] rendered still more interesting by a certain natural and strong expression of misery that seemed to fill the head and mind of the author." More organised subscriptions for Yearsley to publish Poems, on Several Occasions (1785), but its success led to a quarrel between them over access to the trust in which its profits were held. Yearsley included her account of the quarrel in an "autobiographical narrative" appended to a fourth, 1786 edition of the poems.

Now supported by Frederick Hervey, 4th Earl of Bristol, Yearsley published Poems, on Various Subjects in 1787. A Poem on the Inhumanity of the Slave-Trade appeared in 1788. The latter was seen by many critics to rival a similar poem by her ex-patron Hannah More, entitled "Slavery: A Poem".

Yearsley then turned to drama, with Earl Goodwin: an Historical Play (performed in 1789; printed in 1791) and to fiction, with The Royal Captives: a Fragment of Secret History, Copied from an Old Manuscript (1795). Her final poetry collection, The Rural Lyre, appeared in 1796.

== Southey's biography ==
Robert Southey wrote a biography of Ann Yearsley in 1831, calling it an "introductory essay on the lives and works of our uneducated poets". It describes the first encounter that Hannah More had with Ann Yearsley and her general impressions of her capacity as a writer and poet.

As Southey notes, Yearsley based her style, grammar and spelling on the limited amounts of literature she had read, which included some Shakespeare plays, Paradise Lost, and Night-Thoughts. More describes Yearsley as not even having seen a dictionary or knowing anything of grammatical rules, and being bound to "ignorant and vulgar" syntax, yet using language full of metaphor, imagery and personification. More described herself as striving to save Yearsley from the vanity of fame, and was more concerned about providing food for her than making her known. Their eventual disagreement over money left the two estranged. According to the critic Jonathan Rose, More was repeatedly startled when the milkmaid drew on classical sources for a work. Plebeian poets were usually confined to a ghetto of folk poetry in a period of strong class prejudice.

Southey described Yearsley as a writer "gifted with voice", yet she "had no strain of her own whereby to be remembered." He also stated that for a time before her death she was reported to be deranged, though there is no corroboration of this.

== Works ==
- Poems, on Several Occasions (1st edition, with a preface by Hannah More, 1785) (Etexts)
- Poems, on Several Occasions (4th edition, with a new preface by Yearsley, 1786)
- Poems, on Various Subjects (1787)
- A Poem on the Inhumanity of the Slave Trade (1788) (Etext)
- Stanzas of Woe (1790)
- Earl Godwin: An Historical Play (performed 1789; printed 1791)
- The Royal Captives: a Fragment of Secret History, Copied from an Old Manuscript (4 vols., 1795)
- The Rural Lyre: a Volume of Poems (1796)

== See also ==
- List of 18th-century British working-class writers
