= Sophia Burrell =

English poet and dramatist

Sophia, Lady Burrell (née Raymond; 11 April 1753 – 20 June 1802) was an English poet and dramatist.

== Biography ==
She was born Sophia Raymond, eldest daughter of Charles Raymond of Valentines, Essex, and Sarah Webster. Her father was a prominent East India Company Captain. On 13 April 1773 she married William Burrell, Member of Parliament for Haslemere and came into possession, it is said, of 100,000 pounds, then an exorbitant amount of money. A baronetcy was granted to her father in 1774, the year after her marriage, with remainder to her husband and her male issue by him.

== Writings ==
From 1773 to 1782 Lady Burrell's pen was employed on vers de société, varied by such heavier matter as Comala, from Ossian, in 1784. Lady Burrell published two volumes of collected poems in 1793, and also the Thymriad from Xenophon, and Telemachus. In 1800, Lady Burrell wrote two tragedies. The first was Maximian, dedicated to William Lock, the second Theodora, dedicated by permission to Georgiana Cavendish, Duchess of Devonshire. In 1814 Lady Burrell's tragedy Theodora was reprinted in The New British Theatre (vol. i.), a collection of rejected dramas.

== Later life ==
In 1787 her husband's health failed, and they retired to a seat at Deepdene. In 1796 William Burrell died, Lady Burrell having had two sons and two daughters by him. On 23 May 1797 she was remarried at Marylebone Church to the Reverend William Clay, a son of Richard Augustus Clay of Southwell, Nottinghamshire.

Lady Burrell and William Clay retired to Cowes, Isle of Wight, where she died in 1802, aged 52.
