= List of women rhetoricians =

The following is a timeline of contributions made to the field of rhetoric by women.

== Before Common Era ==
- Aspasia (c. 410 BC) was a Milesian woman who was known and highly regarded for her teaching of political theory and rhetoric. She is mentioned in Plato's Memexenus, and is often credited with teaching the Socratic method to Socrates.
- Diotima of Mantinea (4th century BC) is an important character in Plato's Symposium. It is uncertain if she was a real person or perhaps a character modelled after Aspasia, for whom Plato had much respect.

== 14th century ==
- Julian of Norwich (1343–1415) English mystic who challenged the teachings of medieval Christianity in regard to women's inferior role in religion.

- Revelations of Divine Love

- Catherine of Siena (1347–1380) Italian who was influential through her writings to men and women in authority, where she begged for peace in Italy and for the return of the papacy to Rome. She was canonized in 1461 by Pope Pius II.

- "Letter 83: To Mona Lapa, her mother, in Siena" (1376)

- Christine de Pizan (1365–1430) Venetian who moved to France at an early age. She was influential as a writer, rhetorician and critic during the medieval period, and was Europe's first female professional author.

- The Book of the City of Ladies (1404)

- Margery Kempe (1373–1439) British woman who could neither read nor write, but dictated her life story The Book of Margery Kempe after receiving a vision of Christ during the birth of the first of her fourteen children. From the 15th century Kempe was viewed as a holy woman after her book was published in pamphlet form with any thought or behavior that could be viewed as nonconforming or unorthodox removed. When the original was rediscovered in 1934, a more complex self-portrait emerged.

- The Book of Margery Kempe (1436)

== 15th century ==
- Laura Cereta (1469–1499) Italian humanist and feminist who was influential in the letters she wrote to other intellectuals. Through her letters she fought for women's right to education and against the oppression of married women.

- Letter to Bibulus, Sempronius, Defense of the Liberal Instruction of Women (1488)

== 17th century ==
- Margaret Fell (1614–1702) British founding member of the Religious Society of Friends, and was popularly known as the "mother of Quakerism". She was persecuted and imprisoned for speaking her mind. She is credited with many essential changes within the Quaker church which brought more freedom for women in religious, social, and political areas.

- Women's Speaking Justified, Proved and Allowed by the Scriptures (1666)

- Margaret Cavendish, Duchess of Newcastle (c. 1623–1673) British novelist, playwright, philosopher, poet, and rhetorician. Recent critics—most notably Christine Sutherland and Jane Donawerth—have explored her rhetorical theory and practice. Key works in this vein include:

- sections of The Worlds Olio (1655)
- Orations of Divers Sorts (1662)
- The Female Academy in Playes (1662)

- Sor Juana Inés de la Cruz (1651–1695) Mexican who entered a convent to dedicate her life to scholarship. She took part in the elite intellectual circles of her time, and many see her as the first feminist of the New World. She wrote poetry, essays, and religious treatises, and argued for a more holistic role for women in society.

- La Respuesta (1691)

- Mary Astell (1668–1731) regarded by many as the first English feminist writer. In her anonymous publications, Astell vigorously supported equal education opportunities for women.

- A Serious Proposal to the Ladies (1694)
- A Serious Proposal to the Ladies, Part II (1697)
- Some Reflections Upon Marriage (1700)

== 18th century ==
- Mary Wollstonecraft (1759–1797) British writer who wrote abundantly across the disciplines. In her brief writing career she advocated women's equality and argued against the male birthright as a necessity for political rights. Today, she is celebrated as an essential force in the history of feminism.

- A Vindication of the Rights of Woman (1792)

== Nineteenth century ==
- Susan B. Anthony (1820–1906)

- The United States of America v. Susan B. Anthony (1873)

- Anna Julia Cooper (1858–1964)

- The Higher Education of Women (1892)

- Kate Chopin (1850–1904)

- The Awakening (1899)

- Margaret Fuller (1810–1850) American journalist, critic and women's rights activist, a contributor to the "first wave" of feminism in the US. Her idea of gender equality rested upon the transcendental notion of the universal one, the fact that female and male form a whole and require one another.

- Woman in the Nineteenth Century (1845)

- Charlotte Perkins Gilman (1860–1935) prominent American author, artist, lecturer, and feminist social reformer. She is best known for her short story The Yellow Wallpaper, which she based on her own experience with mental illness and misguided medical treatment.

- The Yellow Wallpaper (1892)
- Women and Economics (1898)

- Sarah Grimke (1792–1873) American who was influential in her work in the abolitionist movement during the Civil War and also for writings and lectures she made in support of President Abraham Lincoln. Since Grimke was prohibited from receiving formal education, she educated herself to become the orator she had always wanted to be. She also taught her personal slave to read even though it was against the law for her to do so. Grimke noted that fighting for abolition was as important as fighting for women's rights.

- "Letter to Theodore Weld" (1837)

- Frances Harper (1825–1911)

- We Are All Bound Up Together (1866)

- Elizabeth Cady Stanton (1815–1902) involved in the 19th century temperance and the abolitionist movements. Stanton and Lucretia Mott were the primary organizers of the 1848 Women's Rights Convention in Seneca Falls, New York. Stanton drafted a "Declaration of Sentiments" for the convention, in which she declares that men and women are created equal. She also proposed a resolution demanding the right to vote be extended to include women. That resolution was voted upon at the convention and carried. Stanton went on to write many important documents and speeches of the women's rights movement.

- Declaration of Sentiments (1848)
- The Solitude of Self (1892)

- Maria W. Stewart (1803–1879) African American public speaker, abolitionist, and feminist. Her speeches addressed the plight of Northern black people and drew arguments from the Scriptures. She became the first woman to speak in front of a mixed audience, both male and female, black and white.

- "Lecture Delivered at the Franklin Hall" (1832)

- Sojourner Truth (1797–1883) American abolitionist. A former slave, she became an important rhetorical figure for the women's rights movement. Truth could neither read nor write, but had powerful oratory skills, which she used to challenge white Americans to live up to their own ideals.

- Ar'n't I a Woman? (1851)

- Ida B. Wells (1862–1931) was born into slavery, researched and rallied campaigns against systematic lynching in the South at the end of the 1800s. After much personal tragedy, she expanded her activism to Europe. Wells was known for her strong belief in logos and her idea that the truth speaks for itself.

- Lynch Law in All its Phases (1893)

- Fannie Barrier Williams (1855–1944)

- The Intellectual Progress of Colored Women of the United States since the Emancipation Proclamation (1893)

- Sarah Winnemucca (1841–1891)

- Life Among the Piutes (1883)

== Twentieth century ==
- Gertrude Buck (1871–1922)

- The Present Status of Rhetorical Theory (1900)

- Margaret Sanger (1879–1966) founder of the American Birth Control League (currently called Planned Parenthood), a birth control activist, and an advocate of certain aspects of eugenics. Sanger eventually gained support of the public and courts for ideas giving women the right to decide when and how she will bear children even though the public and courts were fiercely opposed to them at first. Margaret Sanger was instrumental in opening the way to universal access to birth control.

- Letter to the Readers of The Woman Rebel (1914)

- Emma Goldman (1869–1940)

- Marriage and Love (1914)

- Alice Dunbar-Nelson (1875–1935)

- Facing Life Squarely (1927)

- Dorothy Day (1897–1980)

- Memorial Day in Chicago (1937)

- Virginia Woolf (1882–1941) British author who is considered, by many, to be one of the foremost modernist/feminist literary figures of the twentieth century. Woolf was a significant figure in London literary society and a member of the Bloomsbury Group between World War I and World War II.

- Professions for Women (1942)
- Mrs. Dalloway (1925)
- To the Lighthouse (1927)
- Orlando (1928)
- A Room of One's Own (1929)

- Zora Neale Hurston (1891–1960)

- Crazy for This Democracy (1945)

- Simone de Beauvoir (1908–1986)

- The Second Sex (1952)

- Rachel Carson (1907–1964)

- A Fable for Tomorrow (1962)

- Adrienne Rich (1929–2012)

- When We Dead Awaken: Writing as Re-Vision (1971)

- Hélène Cixous (1937– ) considered one of the three most famous feminists in France, being a professor of literature at the Universite de Paris VIII which she helped to found in 1968. She has written more than thirty books of fiction as well as numerous essays and plays. She urges women to reclaim their natural relationships with their bodies and become rhetorically expressive. Cixous's work sparked the French feminist theory of écriture feminine.

- Sorties (1975)
- The Laugh of the Medusa (1975)

- Julia Kristeva (1941– )

- Women’s Time (1979)

- Audre Lorde (1934–1992)

- The Transformation of Silence into Language and Action (1977)

- Merle Woo (1941– ) Asian American activist who brought two lawsuits against the University of California in the 1980s for race, gender, sexual orientation, and political bias. In her "Letter to Ma," she re-lives the silent relationship with her mother and addresses social issues such as racism, sexism, oppression and exploitation as underlying themes. Her letter resonates with the Asian American experience and reclaims power and pride for Asian American heritage.

- Letter to Ma (1980)

- Alice Walker (1944– )

- In Search of Our Mothers' Gardens (1983)

- Evelyn Fox Keller (1936– )

- A Feeling for the Organism (1983)

- Andrea Dworkin (1946–2005)

- I Want a Twenty-Four Hour Truce During Which There Is No Rape (1983)

- Paula Gunn Allen (1939–2008)

- Grandmother of the Sun: Ritual Gynocracy in Native America (1986)

- Gloria Anzaldua (1942–2004)

- Borderlands (1987)

- June Jordan (1936–2002)

- Don't You Talk About My Momma! (1987)

- bell hooks, born Gloria Jean Watkins (1952–2021), internationally recognized intellectual, speaker, writer, and social activist. She focuses on how race, class, and gender and their ability to produce and perpetuate systems of oppression and domination are interconnected. She is a recognized author and has published over thirty books and numerous scholarly and mainstream articles. She has also appeared in several documentary films, and participated in various public lectures. hooks addresses race, gender, and class in education, sexuality, feminism, history, art and the mass media through a black female perspective.

- Homeplace (a site of resistance) (1990)

- Nancy Mairs (1964– )

- Carnal Acts (1990)
- On Being a Cripple

- Terry Tempest-Williams (1955– )

- The Clan of One-Breasted Women (1991)

- Minnie Bruce Pratt (1946– )

- Gender Quiz (1995)

- Dorothy Allison (1949– )

- Two or Three Things I Know for Sure (1995)

- Nomy Lamm (1976– ) self-described “fat-ass bad-ass Jew dyke amputee.” She is also an award-winning musician (queer punk). She forces her audience, whether through her music or through her lectures, to consider the oppression of fat people. Because of this activism, she earned the title "Woman of the Year" from Ms. Magazine.

- It's a Big Fat Revolution (1995)

- Leslie Marmon Silko (1948– )

- Yellow Woman and a Beauty of the Spirit (1996)

- Ruth Behar (1962– ) was born in Cuba in 1962. Her parents moved Behar's family to the US where she became an accomplished poet, writer, filmmaker, and anthropologist. She is currently employed at the University of Michigan.

- Anthropology That Breaks Your Heart (1996)

- Gloria Steinem (1934–2026)

- Outrageous Acts and Everyday Rebellions(1983)
- Marilyn: Norma Jean (1986)
- Revolution from Within (1992)
- Moving beyond Words (1993)
- Supremacy Crimes (1999)

== Sources ==
- Available Means: An Anthology of Women's Rhetoric. Ed. Richie, Joy & Kate Ronald. Pittsburgh: University Press, 2001.
