= Elizabeth Frances Amherst (poet) =

English poet, naturalist (1716 – 1779)

Elizabeth Amherst Thomas
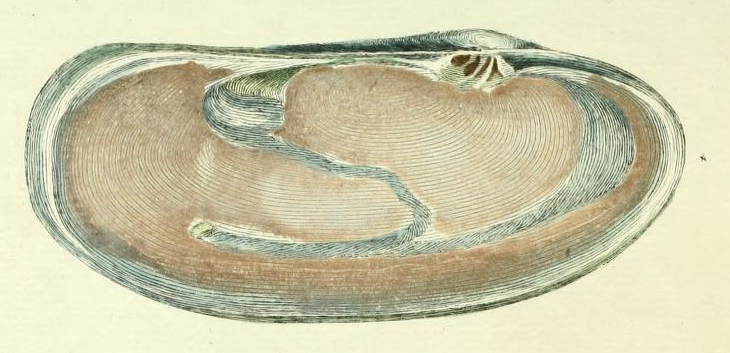
- Lutraria magna from Emanuel Mendes da Costa's Historia naturalis testaceorum Britanniæ (London, 1778: pl.17, fig.4). Da Costa was one of Amherst's scientific correspondents.
- Born: Elizabeth Amherst c. 1716
- Died: 1779; Newbold, Warwickshire
- Occupations: poet and naturalist
- Spouse: John Thomas
- Writing career
- Language: English

Elizabeth Frances Amherst (later Thomas; c. 1716 – 1779), was an English poet and amateur naturalist. Although she remained largely unpublished during her own lifetime, she has engendered interest among twentieth- and twenty-first-century critics.

== Biography ==
Amherst was born c.1716 to Elizabeth Kerrill and Jeffrey Amherst (1677–1750) of Kent, one of two girls and seven boys. She married John Thomas, of Welford, Gloucestershire, and rector of Notgrove, Cotswolds; the couple had no children of their own and adopted a son, the child of a brother-in-law. One of her brothers, Jeffery, became Baron Amherst in 1776 and later became a field-marshal in the British Army: he was Commander-in-Chief of the British armed forces when they took Montreal in 1760.

Amherst was an avid fossil collector and maintained an active correspondence on the subject both before and after her marriage. Her poems, often written in "lively octosyllabics and ballad metres" would seem to have circulated mainly in manuscript and within her own circle, though a few were printed anonymously in the 1760s.

Virtually unknown in the twentieth century until Roger Lonsdale included her work in his anthology in 1989, critics have since found her work to be of interest. Lonsdale describes her poems as "sprightly", and another commentator remarks on her "tone of tolerant amusement" in evoking village "types" in "The Welford wedding." Her "A prize riddle on herself when 24" is described by a third as "a wry self-portrait." A fourth assesses her writing as "often whimsical, witty, resisting stereotypes about women."

== Works ==
Much of her writing is known from the Bodleian Library manuscript, "The Whims of E.A./afterwards Mrs. Thomas," though there are items in other manuscript collections, as well as some published pieces.

=== Poems ===
- "A prize riddle on herself when 24"
- "A song for the single table on New Year's Day"
- "From a young woman to an old officer who courted her"
- "The Welford wedding"
- "Verses designed to be sent to Mr. Adams"
- "To William Shenstone, Esq; the Production of half an hour's leisure. By Cotswouldia."
- First lines of the forty-six (46) poems in "The Whims of E.A./afterwards Mrs. Thomas"

=== Plays ===
- A Dramatic Pastoral. By a Lady. (Gloucester, 1762)
