= Poems on Several Occasions =

Poems on Several Occasions may refer to:

- Poems on Several Occasions (Lady Mary Chudleigh) by Lady Mary Chudleigh, 1703
- Poems on Several Occasions (Matthew Prior) by Matthew Prior, 1707, 1709, 1718, 1721
- Poems on Several Occasions (Henry Carey) by Henry Carey, 1713
- Poems on Several Occasions (John Gay) by John Gay, 1720
- Poems on Several Occasions (Christopher Smart) by Christopher Smart, 1752
- Poems on Several Occasions (Michael Bruce) by Michael Bruce, 1770
- Poems on Several Occasions (James Graeme) by James Graeme, 1773
