= Elstob =

Elstob is a surname. Notable people with the surname include:

- Elizabeth Elstob (1683–1756), scholar
- Peter Elstob (1915–2002), British soldier, author, and entrepreneur
- Wilfrith Elstob (1888–1918), English recipient of the Victoria Cross
- William Elstob (1673–1715), English divine
