= Women in the Enlightenment =

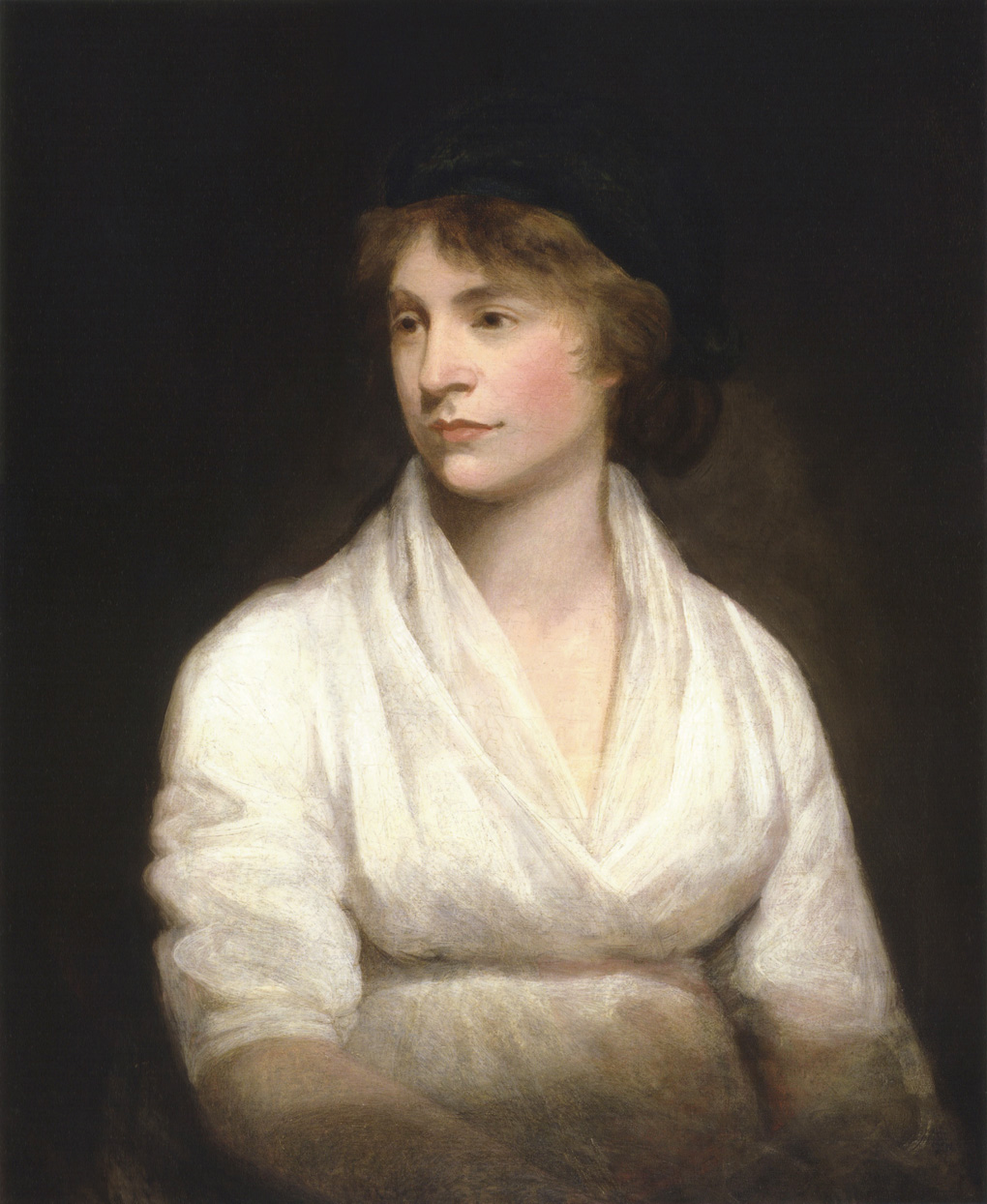
Author Mary Wollstonecraft

The role of women in the Enlightenment is often overshadowed by that of their male counterparts, however, more recent scholarship has focused on womens' writings and philosophies. It is acknowledged that women during this era were not considered of equal status to men, and much of their work and effort were suppressed. Even so, salons, coffeehouses, debating societies, academic competitions and print all became avenues for women to socialize, learn and discuss enlightenment ideas. For many women, these avenues furthered their roles in society and created stepping stones for future progress.

The Enlightenment came to advance ideals of liberty, progress, and tolerance. For those women who were able to discuss and advance new ideals, discourse on religion, political and social equality, and sexuality became prominent topics in the salons, debating societies, and in print. While women in England and France gained arguably more freedom than their counterparts in other countries, the role of women in the Enlightenment was typically reserved for those of middle and also the upper-class families, were then allowed and able to access money to join societies and the education to participate in debate. Therefore, the women in the Enlightenment only represented a small class of society and not the entire female sex.

== The Republic of Letters ==
Women were prolific writers. They did not work in isolation, rather, they corresponded and drew inspiration from each other through a system that would come to be called the Republic of Letters. Via the Republic, people who had never met could engage in intellectual discussions. Anna Maria van Schurman, a Dutch polyglot famed for her "erudite" mind, had an extensive network of women with whom she corresponded, including Marie le Jars de Gournay, Anne de Rohan, Princess Elisabeth of Bohemia, among others. The way women presented themselves differed from one another. Some, like Schurman, eschewed praise as a way to avoid negative receptions; humility, as a tool, provided a way for a learned women to limit their perceived intellectual threat to men. Others, such as de Gournay, faced intense ridicule for her stances on gender equality (The Equality of Men and Women) (1626), in addition to presenting herself, against the norms of the time, "...as an independent woman and proffesional writer". Furthermore, women used the stereoype of the "frivolous" women as a tool to circumvent critiques; by writing parodies, women were able to create a "...new powerful authorial feminine persona...". By engaging with so-called lower or frivolous genres, such as fairytales, women could explore new indentities and voices.

== Significant people and publications ==
The role of women in society became a topic of discussion during the Enlightenment. Influential philosophers and thinkers such as John Locke, David Hume, Adam Smith, Nicolas de Condorcet, and Jean-Jacques Rousseau debated matters of gender equality. Prior to the Enlightenment, women were not considered of equal status to men in Western society. For example, Rousseau believed that women were subordinate to men and women should obey men. Challenging the popular inequality, Locke believed that the notion that men are superior to women was created by man. Condorcet also challenged the existing gender inequality by advocating for female political equality. However, many philosophes of the Enlightenment relied heavily on the patronage and work of women to continue their work; women served not just as an audience to the work of philosophes, but as editors, like Donneau de Visé. Charles Perrault would say that to be a modern thinker, one must therefore think as a woman. Authors cited Queen Elizabeth, Empress Catherine of Russia, and Queen Maria Theresa of Austria as powerful women who were capable of intellect. In recent years the relationship between religion and Enlightenment, e.g. in the Catholic Enlightenment, in the works and lives of women writers has come to the attention of historians.

Prolific Enlightenment women philosophers and historians included Mary Wollstonecraft, Olympe de Gouges, Catherine Macaulay, Mary Astell, Judith Sargent Murray (under the pseudonym "Constantia"), Mary Chudleigh, and Louise d’Épinay. Macaulay's influential The Letters on Education (1790) advocated for the education of women. Wollstonecraft's A Vindication of the Rights of Woman (1792) used similar arguments, stating that women ought to have education commensurate with their position in society. Women's access to education gave rise to the potential to hasten the progress of society. De Gouges published the Declaration of the Rights of Woman and the Female Citizen (1791) as a testament to the political inequality of women and to challenge male authority in society. Fairytales were pioneered by women in the seventeenth century Enlightenment; prior to 1690, with Marie-Catherine d'Aulnoy's novel L'Histoire d'Hypolite, comte de Duglas, the genre of "literary fairytale" did not exist.

== Main topics of discussion ==
Most of these women in their discussions of women's rights and standing try to counteract major points brought up against women. Some of the major themes that they argued against was how religion and natural law proved women's inferiority. Mary Astell in her essay Some Reflections Upon Marriage brings up how two saints, St. Paul and St. Peter, don't bring up the law of nature as their reasoning for women submitting themselves to their husbands, but different reasons:

BUT the Scripture commands Wives to submit themselves to their own Husbands. True; for which St. Paul gives a Mystical Reason (Eph. v. 22, &c.) and St. Peter, a Prudential and Charitable one, (I Pet. iii.) but neither of them derive that Subjection from the Law of Nature. Nay, St. Paul, as if he foresaw and meant to prevent this Plea, giving Directions for their Conduct to Women in general, I Tim. ii. when he comes to speak of Subjection, he changes his Phrase from Women, which denotes the whole Sex, to Woman, which in the New Testament is appropriated to Wife.

Judith Sargent Murray also contracts general reading of scripture with her discussion of Adam and Eve in the garden of Eden, saying that Eve is the one less at fault for their being kicked out because of her lack of knowledge, and Adam, who had more knowledge about their situation, was not blindly lead to his own ruin as he is usually portrayed and thus more at fault for his being expelled.

There is also a proclivity among the women to argue with some of the major philosophers of their time who are arguing for women to stay in their subjugated positions. Some of them, including Catharine Macaulay and Mary Wollstonecraft, directly bring up Jean-Jacques Rousseau and his opinions on women to contradict them and show how they aren't applicable in a fully functioning society. Catharine Macaulay criticizes Rousseau's low opinion of women in multiple places, writing "... but never did enthusiasm and the love of paradox, those enemies to philosophical disquisition, appear in more strong opposition to plain sense than in Rousseau's definition of this difference," and "I am persuaded that Rousseau's understanding was too good to have led him into this error, had he not been blinded by his pride and his sensuality."

Education was another big topic of discussion among advocates and naysayers of women's rights. Mary Astell in Some Reflections Upon Marriage discusses how women didn't have the same opportunities as men due to the fact that they weren't given priority. She also brings up how women who are educated or 'naturally' smart get demoralized when they show their knowledge. Catharine Macaulay in her Letters on Education brings up the difficulties that arise in trying to come up with a better way to educate women that doesn't lead them down the path of moral depravity in a society that is set against them. Judith Sargent Murray brings up how women wouldn't be as prone to let their mind wander to such vices as imagination and that if women were given the same opportunities as men, that they would meet them at their level.

And if we are allowed an equality of acquirements, let serious studies equally employ our minds, and we will bid our souls arise to equal strength. We will meet upon even ground, the despot man; we will rush with alacrity to the combat, and, crowned by success, we shall then answer the exalted expectations which are formed.

Marriage was also a topic of discussion. In her Declaration of the Rights of Woman, de Gouges argued for the abolition of marriage, recommending it be replaced with a "Social Contract" in which men and women are equal partners; importantly, within these marriages, neither partner would have legal advantage. In her analyses of women, de Gouges argued that the vices and stereotypes attributed to women were rooted in a lack of education, and that when women were granted full political rights the "ruses of the weak" would end.

== Salons ==
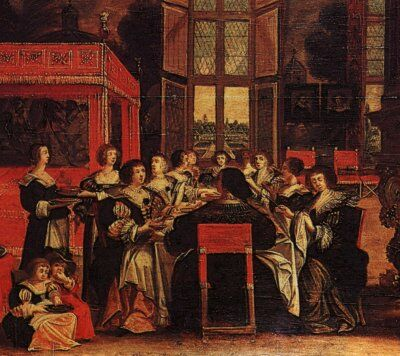
A salon depicted by French painter Abraham Bosse.

Salons were a forum in which elite, well-educated women could continue their learning in a place of civil conversation, while governing the political discourse and a place where people of all social orders could interact.

In the 18th century, under the guidance of Madame Geoffrin, Mademoiselle de Lespinasse, and Suzanne Curchod (Madame Necker), the salon was transformed from a venue of leisure into a place of enlightenment. In the salon, there was no formal class or education barrier to prevent attendees from participating in open discussion. Throughout the 18th century the salon served as a matrix for Enlightenment ideals. Women were important in this capacity because they took on the role of salonnieres.

Salons of France were assembled by a small number of elite women who were concerned with education and promoting philosophies of the Enlightenment. Salons were hosted in a private home or a hotel dining room. There was a meal, and discourse took place afterwards. During the meal, the focus would be on the discourse between patrons rather than the dining.

The salons had a hierarchical social structure where social ranks were upheld but under different rules of conversation designed to limit misunderstandings and conflict. Participants were often people from different societal ranks, allowing the commoners to interact with people with a higher status. Many people used fashionable opinions to move up social ladders.

Within the hierarchy of the salons, women assumed a role of governance. Initially an institution of recreation, salons became an active institution of Enlightenment. Madame Necker, wife to Louis XVI's financial minister, provides an example of how the salons' topics may have had a bearing on official government policy.

Some believe that the salons actually reinforced or only made the gender and societal differences bearable. The salons allowed people of varying social classes to converse but never as equals. Women in salons were active in ways similar to women in traditional court society as protectorates, or socially active as their presence is said to encourage civil activity and politeness. Additionally, salons were often not used for educational purposes, rather as a way to socialize and entertain. Others argue that Salons were places where individuals with little bearing on politics could extert influence; the Republic of Letters and the salons that supplied it had the capacity to challenge aristocratic norms from a distance. Women, whether they be hosts or active participants, existed within and had an impact on the politics of the seventeenth and eighteenth century, and importantly, salonnières did not see themselves as passive in their work.

== Coffeehouses ==
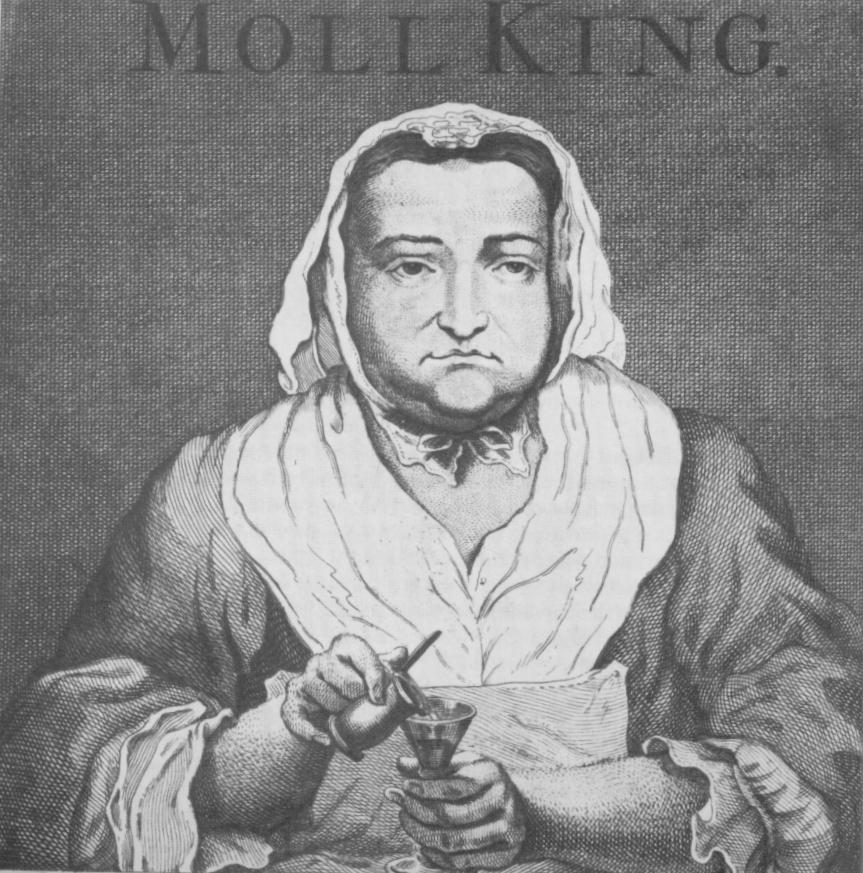
Moll King

A coffeehouse was a place where English virtuosi would gather to converse and educate in a civilized setting. People of all levels of knowledge gathered to share and debate information and interests. Coffeehouses brought people together to learn, but they were not associated with any university or institution. As informal practices of education, coffeehouses were often condemned and deemed improper by male scholars who were accustomed to completely male-dominated institutions.

Coffeehouses is where most all women were involved, like the one run by Moll King, were said to degrade traditional, virtuosic, male-run coffeehouses. King's fashionable coffeehouse operated into late hours of the night and catered to clientele very different from the virtuosi. Her coffeehouse shows that Enlightenment women were not always simply the timid gender, governors of polite conversation, or protectorates of aspiring artists.

== Debating societies ==
Debating societies were popular gatherings that included both education and recreation through state and social affairs. A hall was rented and attendees were charged an admission fee to discuss various topics in the public sphere. Debating societies were initially male-dominated, but they developed into mixed-gender organizations and women-only events. Unlike in salons, women were able to participate as equals, not as governors or protectors.

Debating societies, which prior to the Enlightenment were exclusively male, gained popularity in London in the 1750s. Women in England entered the conversation on Enlightenment ideals by joining the debating societies. Anyone who paid an admission fee would be able to enter and speak. Financial status was a barrier to some in the lower classes, but admission of women into debating societies opened up political and social discourse to a larger portion of society. The societies were the only outlet for lower and middle class individuals to express unorthodox views of the time. The women's only debating societies brought to public notice the burgeoning demand for equal education, equal political rights, and the protection of women's occupations. Women's attendance at debating societies was seen as an incursion on male space and drew considerable criticism. This criticism was a driver for the creation of women's only debating societies.

At the end of 1780, there were four known women-only debating societies: La Belle Assemblee, the Female Parliament, the Carlisle House Debates for Ladies only, and the Female Congress. The topics often dealt with questions of male and female relations, marriage, courtship, and whether women should be allowed to partake in the political culture.

Though women were asked to partake in debating societies, there were stipulations as to which societies they could be a part of and when they were permitted to attend. Women were only allowed to participate when no alcohol was present. Although women attended and participated in debating societies, they were often accused of not holding valid arguments and acting simply as puppets.

== Print ==
Women were more involved in publishing their writings than previously thought. In order to publish work during most of the Enlightenment, a married woman had to have written consent from her husband. As the Old Regime began to fail, women became more prolific in their publications. Publishers were no longer concerned about a husband's consent, and a more commercial attitude was adopted, publishing books that were going to sell. With the new economic outlook of the Enlightenment, female writers were granted more opportunity in the print sphere.

The opening up of the publishing world made it easier for women to make a living off of the profession. Writing was an ideal occupation as it was mentally fulfilling, could be done anywhere and was adaptable to life's circumstances. Many women who wrote did not depend on the money and often wrote for charities, while others wrote to get out of debt. Topics they chose often defied the gender roles of the day as there were few boundaries of self-expression.

Print culture became far more accessible to women in the 18th century. Through the production of cheap editions and through the expanding amount of books targeted toward a female readership, women were more able to access education. Prior to the 18th century, many women gained knowledge from correspondence with males because books were not as accessible to them. Social circles emerged around printed books. While the reading habits of men often revolved around silent study, many women used reading as a social activity and for political dialogue. Reading books in intimate gatherings became a mode that fostered discourse among women.

== Academic competitions ==
Some historians, such as Pieretti and John Iverson, say participation of women in academic competitions peaked during the time of King Louis XIV and slowly tapered off. Others, like Robert Darnton, fail to mention them at all. Jeremy Caradonna presents evidence to the contrary, showing that 49 of the over 2000 prize competitions were won by women. This number is a little misleading, however, because many of the women won on more than one occasion. The idea that women only won because the prize competitions were completely anonymous is dispelled by Caradonna as well.

Questions shifted from men-centric interests to questions regarding women's rights and education, encouraging female participation. The academy of Besançon was one to receive many female entries during the two years the competition was open. One of the members of the academy released a pamphlet reprimanding misogynist opinions. Though there were many women who participated, only winning a prize competition ensured publication.
