= Carlisle House =

Carlisle House may refer to:

in England

- Carlisle House, the site of one of London Debating Societies and one of just four places Women in the Enlightenment debated
- Carlisle House, Soho, either of two late seventeenth-century mansions in Soho Square, London
- Carlisle House, in Morpeth, Northumberland
- Carlisle House, Lambeth, a home of Samuel Bradford

in the United States

(by state then town or city)

- Kenworthy Hall, also known as the Carlisle-Martin House and Carlisle Hall, NRHP-listed, near Marion, Alabama
- Carlisle House (Milford, Delaware), listed on the NRHP in Sussex County, Delaware
- Knights of Pythias Pavilion, in Franklin, Tennessee, NRHP-listed, also known as Carlisle House
- Tubbs-Carlisle House, Lubbock, Texas, NRHP-listed

== See also ==
- Carlisle Castle, Cumbria, England
