= Judith Drake =

Judith Drake (fl. 1670s – 1723) was an English intellectual and author who was active in the last decade of the 17th century. She was part of a circle of intellectuals, authors, and philosophers which included Mary Astell, Lady Mary Chudleigh, Elizabeth Thomas, Elizabeth Elstob, Lady Mary Wortley Montagu, and John Norris. She was married to James Drake F.R.S., physician and Tory pamphleteer. She is remembered in the field of feminist literature for her 1696 essay, An Essay in Defence of the Female Sex.

== Women writers at the end of the 17th century ==
When Judith Drake and the other intellectuals of her circle began writing, they were still a minority and subject to much nay saying. Recently there had been a loosening of censorship of printed books. A few women took this opportunity to publish on gender relationships. Because of their efforts as well as the rise in female literacy, the literary world entered into the debate about women.

== An Essay in Defence of the Female Sex ==
The full name under which the Essay was first published is An Essay in Defence of the Female Sex, In Which are Inserted the Characters of a Pendant, a Squire, a Beau, a Vertuoso, a Poetaster, a City-Critick, &C., in a letter to a lady. Published in London by Roper and E[lizabeth] Wilkinson in 1696, the author was listed only as "a Lady." For many years, the work was attributed to Mary Astell, a contemporary of Drake and author of A Serious Proposal to the Ladies and other works. However, authorship is now decidedly attributed to Drake. Her name is listed in a Curll catalogue issued after 1741 as the author, and the second edition of the Essay included a poem dedicated to the author by James Drake.

The Essay is written in the form of a letter to a female friend. It purports to be inspired by a conversation between several gentlemen and ladies. Drake first constructed the rationalist framework used at that time to explain women's intellectual inferiority, especially using John Locke's An Essay Concerning Human Understanding. She then proceeded to show that this rationale was outdated, and in this modern time, women would benefit from a greater knowledge. Only two works using this kind of rationalist argument had been used for a feminist argument before, and only one of those was written in English. Besides her rational arguments, Drake also wrote sketches of various stereotypes among men: the Pedant, the Country Squire, the News-monger, the Bully, the City-Critick, and the Beau. She uses these pictures to remind her readers that men, also, had follies.

Drake's final argument involves the "new science" of the day. She spoke with physicians, who told her from their studies of anatomy and the workings of the human body that there was no physical difference between men and women in any part of the body that related to or influenced the mind. Drake also gave the example from nature of male and female animals that showed equal wisdom in their actions. From studying the differences of behaviour between classes, she added that socioeconomic level was more likely to make a difference in intelligence between two people than was gender. A man and a woman from the same background are more similar in ability than two men, one a wealthy gentleman and the other a poor farmer. From her conclusions about the capacity of the female intellect, Drake suggests that maybe women were created the weaker vessel because they are meant to think, while stronger men are meant for action. Why could women not do such jobs as accounting, that involved mental capacity and not physical labour? With her combination of Tory ideas and Lockean philosophy, Drake formed an early Enlightenment vision of social roles in which women could be of help in settling the uncertain society of the day.

Many of Drake's thoughts are similar to other feminist writers of her time. For example, Drake says in the Essay, "Women, like our Negroes in our western plantations, are born slaves, and live prisoners all their lives," a sentiment that was later echoed by Astell and Chudleigh. Within a marriage, a woman's role was often little more than a servant to her husband and his interests. Overall, her work joins women's primary concern of the time: education.

Drake was attacked by Swift, Centlivre, and Cibber. No other works by Drake are known to survive; however, it is possible that she might have published, as many women did, under other pseudonyms.
