= Elizabeth Thomas (poet, born 1675) =

British poet 1675–1731

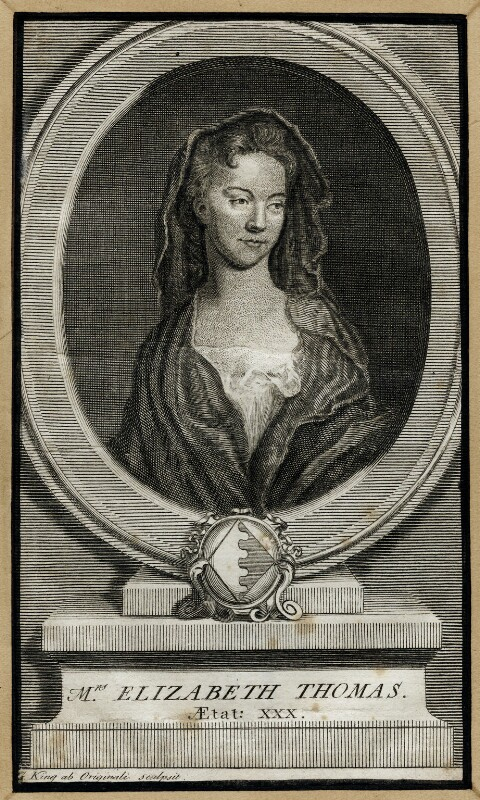
- Engraved portrait of Elizabeth Thomas by Giles King, circa 1730s. National Portrait Gallery, London.
- Born: 31 August 1675; London
- Died: 3 February 1731 (aged 55); London
- Resting place: St Bride's, Fleet Street
- Occupations: Poet and letter-writer
- Writing career
- Pen name: Corinna; Eliza; a young lady
- Language: English
- Notable work: Metamorphosis of the Town (1730)

Elizabeth Thomas (1675 – 1731) was a British poet and letter writer. She was part of an important artistic group in London and John Dryden named her "Corinna". However, she suffered from lifelong financial precarity, romantic disappointment, and latterly, health problems. Her reputation was damaged by Alexander Pope and she spent three years in a debtor's prison near the end of her life.

== Life and career ==
=== Early years ===
Elizabeth Thomas was born in London, the only child of Elizabeth Osborne (died 1719), aged 16, and lawyer Emmanuel Thomas (died 1677), aged 60. Her father died when she was an infant, leaving Osborne to take care of her. Osborne and Thomas faced many financial difficulties while living in Surrey, and after some time they returned to London to live in Great Russel Street. She was educated at home, was well read, and learned some French and Latin.

=== Mid-life ===
By her mid twenties, Thomas was a confident poet who shared her poetry with literary figures of the day. As an impoverished gentlewoman, she was dependent on others for patronage, and she was fortunate to be part of an illustrious artistic and literary circle which included Mary Chudleigh, Mary Astell, Judith Drake, Elizabeth Elstob, Mary Wortley Montagu, John Norris, and painter Sarah Hoadly, wife of Benjamin Hoadly. She sent John Dryden two poems not long before his death, and he responded, "your Verses were, I thought, too good to be a Woman's." Dryden then compared Thomas to the famous Katherine Philips. It was also John Dryden who gave her, at her request, a nom de plume: "Corinna". Her first known publication was an elegy, "To the Memory of the Truly Honoured John Dryden, Esq", published anonymously in the collection Luctus Britannici (1700).

Thomas was engaged for sixteen years to Richard Gwinnett (1675–1717). The couple was not in a financial position to get married until 1716 when Gwinnett finally came into an inheritance. Thomas then postponed the marriage in order to nurse her terminally ill mother. Gwinnett died of consumption the next year, and although he left Thomas a legacy, his family suppressed his will. After litigation, Thomas could not cover her legal costs. During their engagement they had maintained an extensive correspondence, much of which was published as Pylades and Corinna (1731–2) and The Honourable Lovers (1732; repr. 1736) after Thomas's death by Edmund Curll.

Thomas was active and had a reputation in London and Bath literary circles. She experimented with a wide range of literary forms including lyrics, panegyrics, pastorals, polemics, religious meditations, and satires. Much of her poetry dealt with women's issues, particularly women's right to education, as women were in her time "still deny'd th'Improvement of our Mind." In "On Sir J- S- saying in a Sarcastic Manner, My books would make me Mad. An Ode" (1722), the poet exposes the faulty logic of "Sir J– S–" and concludes that he and other men who would deny women access to learning are motivated by

an avaricious Soul,
Which would, with greedy Eyes, monopolize the whole:
And bars us Learning on the selfish Score:
That conscious of our native Worth,
Ye dread to make it more. (ll. 80—84)

Her work initially circulated in manuscript, but due to financial necessity she published Miscellany Poems on Several Subjects anonymously in 1722, and thereafter sought print publication.

=== Reputation ===
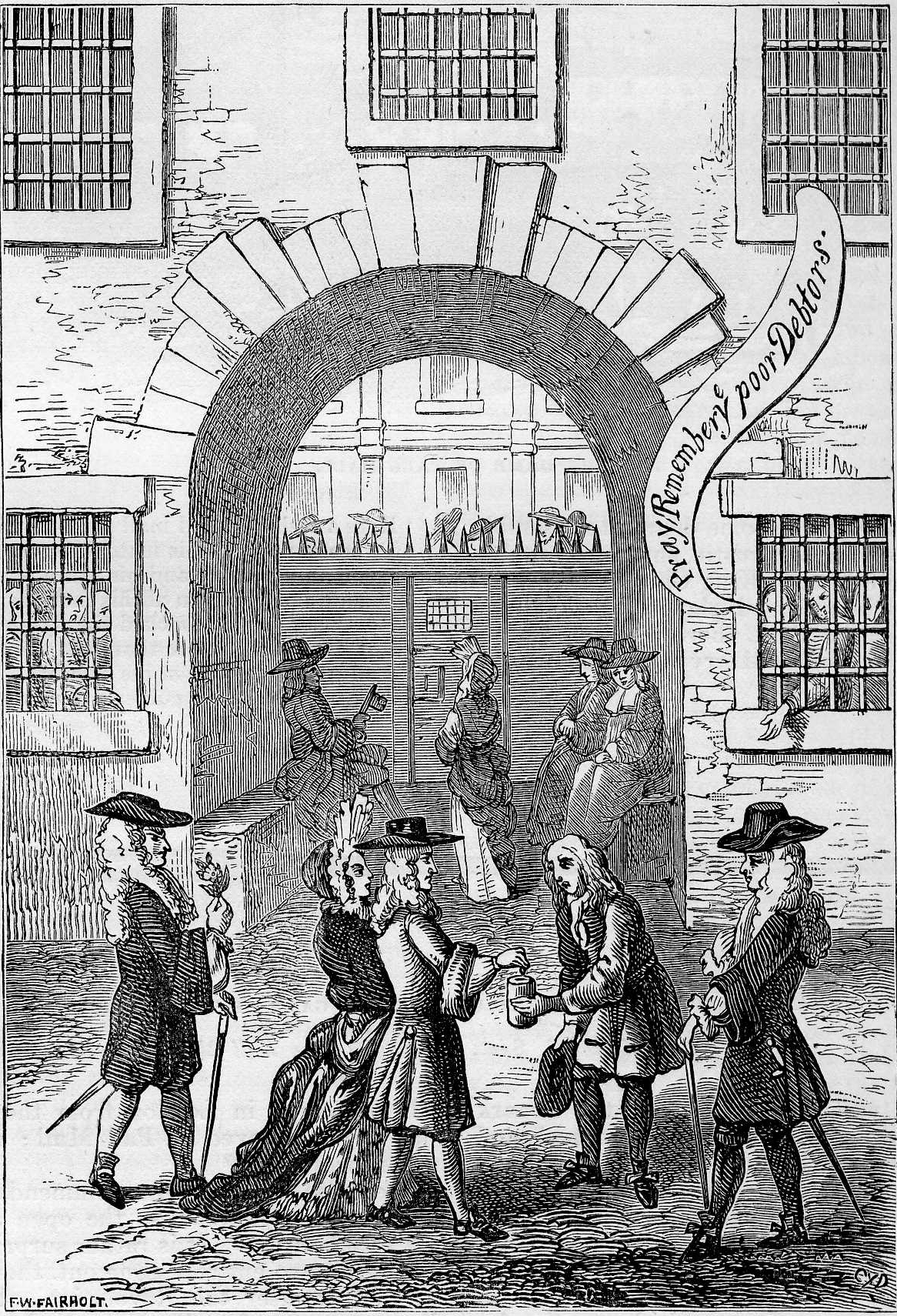
"Pray remember the poor debtors": Old Fleet Prison, 18th century, artist unknown

Her friend Henry Cromwell at one point gave Thomas some letters he had received from a young Alexander Pope. Impoverished, Thomas sold these letters to Edmund Curll in 1726. Curll promptly published the letters in Miscellanea in Two Volumes (1726), much to the irritation of Pope. For this infraction he lampooned Thomas in The Dunciad (1728) as "Curll's Corinna" (II 66):

Full in the middle way there stood a lake,
Which Curl's Corinna chanc'd that morn to make:
(Such was her wont, at early dawn to drop
Her evening cates before his neighbour's shop) (Bk. II, ll. 69—72)

These scatological lines are generally interpreted as referring to ongoing medical issues Thomas suffered — "a history of fluxes, purges, and Surgical and medical horrors" — after 1711. A minor revenge was attributed to her by Pope — the publication of Codrus, or, 'The Dunciad' Dissected (1728). Her reputation was severely damaged by the notoriety, and she was long believed to have been Cromwell's mistress though there is scant reason to believe she was.

=== Later life ===
Thomas continued to publish through the 1720s, but was unable to meet her debts and was jailed in the Fleet prison in 1727 for three years. However, she managed to put even that time to use and wrote from her cell. Within a year of her release, Thomas died and was buried at St Bride's, Fleet Street in 1731.

== Legacy ==
Her publishing history is complicated and as one commentator has it, "Her few authentic works have been upstaged by the many miscellaneous writings which survive in forms probably significantly changed from the way she left them." Another commentator describes Thomas's critical reputation until the twentieth century: "The poetry - often witty and lively, with sharp satiric insights into the social predicament of women - is predictably dismissed, though part of the fate of Rosalinda in Thomas's 'The Execration' is ironically borne out by the poet's own experience: 'To live reserved and free from blame, / And yet incur an evil fame' (l. 36).

Thomas's writing has been anthologized in Greer's Kissing the Rod: an anthology of seventeenth-century women's verse (1988) and Lonsdale's Eighteenth Century Women Poets: An Oxford Anthology (1989).

== Selected works ==
- "To the Memory of the Truly Honoured John Dryden, Esq", Luctus Britannici (anon., 1700)
- Miscellany Poems on Several Subjects (anon.; London: Tomas Combes, 1722); rpt. Poems on Several Occasions (London: Tomas Combes, 1726); rpt. Poems on Several Occasions. To John Dryden Esq; Hen. Cromwel Esq; Reverend Mr. Norris, Sir R. L'Estrange, Lord Hallifax, Anth. Henly Esq; Sir Samuel Garth, Lady Chudleigh, Lady Packington, And Mrs. Phillips, Written by a Lady. The Second Edition. (London: Thomas Astley, 1727)
- Codrus, or, ‘The Dunciad’ Dissected. Being the Finishing-Stroke. To which is added, Farmer Pope and his Son. A Tale. By Mr. Philips. (attrib.; pseud.; London: Edmund Curll, 1728)
- Metamorphosis of the Town; or, a View of the Present Fashions. A Tale: After the Manner of Fontaine. (anon.; London: J. Wilford, 1730; repr. 1731, 1732; posthumously under her own name, 1743)
- R. Gwinnett and E. Thomas, Pylades and Corinna: or, memoirs of the lives, amours, and writings of Richard Gwinnett Esq; Of Great Shurdington in Gloucestershire; and Mrs. Elizabeth Thomas Junr. Of Great Russel Street, Bloomsbury. Containing, the letters and other miscellaneous pieces, in Prose and Verse, which passed between them during a courtship of above sixteen years. Faithfully published from their Original Manuscripts. Attested By Sir Edward Northey, Knight. To which is prefixed, The life of Corinna. Written by her self. 2 vols. (London: Edmund Curll, 1731–2)
- The Honourable Lovers (1732; repr. 1736)
- "To Almystrea [Mary Astell], on Her Divine Works" RL

== Notes and references ==
=== References ===
- Blain, Virginia, et al., eds. "Thomas, Elizabeth." The Feminist Companion to Literature in English. New Haven and London: Yale UP, 1990. pp. 1075–1076.
- Brown, Susan, et al. "Elizabeth Thomas." Orlando: Women’s Writing in the British Isles from the Beginnings to the Present. Ed. Susan Brown, Patricia Clements, and Isobel Grundy. Cambridge University Press. Cambridge UP, n.d. 22 Mar. 2013. Accessed 14 Sept. 2022.
- Clarke, Norma. The rise and fall of the woman of letters. London: Pimlico, 2004.
- Greer, Germaine, et al., eds. "Elizabeth Thomas." Kissing the Rod: an anthology of seventeenth-century women's verse. Farrar Straus Giroux, 1988. pp. 429–438.
- Roger Lonsdale, ed. "Elizabeth Thomas." Eighteenth Century Women Poets: An Oxford Anthology. New York: Oxford University Press, 1989, pp. 32–33.
- McWhir, Anne. "Elizabeth Thomas and the Two Corinnas: giving the woman writer a bad name." ELH Mar 22, 1995. (Etext, The Free Library)
- Mills, Rebecca. "Thomas, Elizabeth (1675–1731)." Oxford Dictionary of National Biography. Ed. H. C. G. Matthew and Brian Harrison. Oxford: OUP, 2004. 13 May 2007.
- "Thomas, Elizabeth." The Women's Print History Project, 2019, Person ID 1422. Accessed 2022-09-12.
