= Carnwath =

Village in South Lanarkshire, Scotland

Coordinates: 55°42′02″N 3°37′30″W

Carnwath: Scottish Gaelic: A' Chathair Nuadh
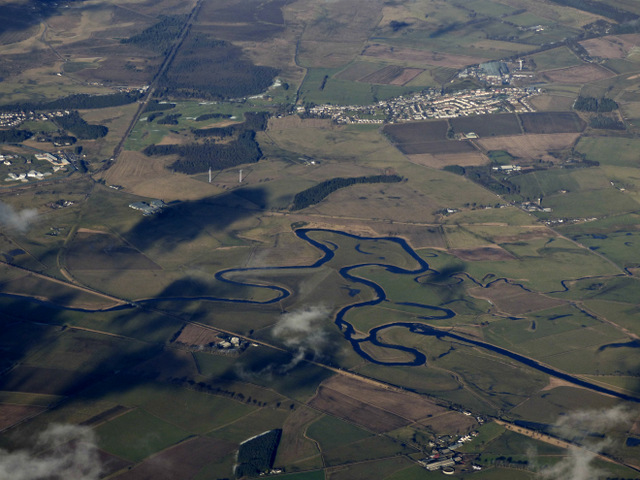
- The Carstairs meanders near Carnwath

- Location within South Lanarkshire
- Population: 1,360 (2020)
- OS grid reference: NS979464
- Council area: South Lanarkshire
- Lieutenancy area: Lanarkshire
- Country: Scotland
- Sovereign state: United Kingdom
- Post town: LANARK
- Postcode district: ML11
- Dialling code: 01555
- Police: Scotland
- Fire: Scottish
- Ambulance: Scottish
- UK Parliament: Dumfriesshire, Clydesdale and Tweeddale
- Scottish Parliament: Clydesdale
- Website: Visit Lanarkshire

Carnwath (Scottish Gaelic: A' Chathair Nuadh 'New Fort') is a moorland village on the southern edge of the Pentland Hills of South Lanarkshire, Scotland. The village lies about 30 mi (50 km) south of both Edinburgh and Glasgow. It is bounded by the North Medwyn and South Medwyn watercourses.

== History ==
Carnwath stands about a mile north of the old Roman road connecting forts in Tweeddale with those on the Clyde.

The former castle of Carnwath is believed to date to the mid 12th-century built under the orders of William de Sommerville (d. 1160). Nothing remains but the motte which is visible beside the Carnwath Golf Club (founded 1907), at the west end of the village; it has been described as "the most impressive Norman earthwork to survive in Lanarkshire", and is a scheduled ancient monument.

At the centre of Carnwath is Carnwath Cross, the mercat cross, set back a little where the Main Street widens to form the Market Square. This was erected by the 5th Lord Somerville in 1516 to celebrate the granting of burgh status to the village in 1514.

Carnwath collegiate church was established in 1386. The only surviving part of the original collegiate church is St Mary's Aisle, built in 1424 and funded by Thomas Somerville, 1st Lord Somerville (later used as a mausoleum for the Lord Somervilles). St Mary's Aisle is Category A listed. In 1869, a new parish church was built beside the earlier buildings to a design by the Scottish architect David Bryce. The church is Scottish baronial in style and is Category B listed. The church no longer functions as a place of worship.

In 1630, the Carnwath estate, then owned by the Earl of Mar was purchased by Sir Robert Dalzell, later to become Lord Dalzell. In 1639, his son, Robert the 2nd Lord Dalzell, was further elevated to become the Earl of Carnwath. The title was forfeit in 1716 when the 5th Earl of Carnwath, Robert Dalzell was attainted due to his support of the Jacobite cause during the Fifteen, however the titles were restored to the family in 1826. Writer, spy and politician, George Lockhart, inherited the Carnwath estates from his father, Sir George Lockhart, of the Lockharts of Lee, who had purchased them in 1681 from the Earls of Carnwath.

The Ordnance Gazetteer of Scotland (1882–1885) said the village was: "Long a dingy and disagreeable place, it has been greatly improved". In 1845 the area became a civil parish.

Other buildings of note in the village include the old primary school on Main Street, dated 1876 and abandoned since 2006.

=== A notable spell of cold weather ===
In January 1979 the temperature in Carnwath sank to −24.6 °C (−12.3 °F), which was the lowest temperature recorded anywhere in the British Isles in the 1970s.

== Climate ==
Climate data for Carnwath: 208 m (682 ft) 1991–2020 normals, extremes 1960–2006
Month	Jan	Feb	Mar	Apr	May	Jun	Jul	Aug	Sep	Oct	Nov	Dec	Year
Record high °C (°F)	12.0 (53.6)	13.5 (56.3)	18.9 (66.0)	25.8 (78.4)	26.6 (79.9)	30.1 (86.2)	29.4 (84.9)	29.8 (85.6)	27.0 (80.6)	21.7 (71.1)	17.2 (63.0)	13.0 (55.4)	30.1 (86.2)
Mean daily maximum °C (°F)	5.6 (42.1)	6.3 (43.3)	8.6 (47.5)	11.3 (52.3)	14.8 (58.6)	16.9 (62.4)	18.8 (65.8)	18.7 (65.7)	16.1 (61.0)	11.8 (53.2)	8.3 (46.9)	5.5 (41.9)	11.9 (53.4)
Daily mean °C (°F)	2.4 (36.3)	2.8 (37.0)	4.7 (40.5)	6.8 (44.2)	9.6 (49.3)	12.1 (53.8)	13.9 (57.0)	13.8 (56.8)	11.5 (52.7)	8.0 (46.4)	4.8 (40.6)	2.2 (36.0)	7.7 (45.9)
Mean daily minimum °C (°F)	−0.8 (30.6)	−0.7 (30.7)	0.7 (33.3)	2.2 (36.0)	4.4 (39.9)	7.4 (45.3)	9.0 (48.2)	8.8 (47.8)	6.9 (44.4)	4.1 (39.4)	1.3 (34.3)	−1.2 (29.8)	3.5 (38.3)
Record low °C (°F)	−24.8 (−12.6)	−21.2 (−6.2)	−19.7 (−3.5)	−9.0 (15.8)	−7.6 (18.3)	−3.8 (25.2)	−1.2 (29.8)	−2.2 (28.0)	−5.5 (22.1)	−9.9 (14.2)	−14.6 (5.7)	−20.0 (−4.0)	−24.8 (−12.6)
Average precipitation mm (inches)	86.7 (3.41)	73.3 (2.89)	64.0 (2.52)	57.9 (2.28)	54.0 (2.13)	61.7 (2.43)	71.1 (2.80)	77.8 (3.06)	71.1 (2.80)	100.3 (3.95)	89.4 (3.52)	89.0 (3.50)	896.3 (35.29)
Average precipitation days	15.1	13.4	12.6	12.4	11.1	11.7	12.1	12.3	12.1	14.6	15.9	14.1	157.4
Source 1: Météo Climat
Source 2: KNMI (extremes)

== Economy ==
There is a large production facility to the NE of the village belonging to BHC Building Merchants. In 2007, the company applied to extend the facility and an archaeological survey was completed beforehand.

The historic New/Wee Bush Inn was a former 18th century coaching inn that has been converted to housing. The inn buildings are category B listed. The Inn was damaged by fire in 2002 and was the last pub in Scotland to have a thatched roof. For insurance purposes it has had to be rebuilt with a slate roof. The Inn's former claim to fame was that actor Oliver Reed was a regular customer.

There are two bakeries (one with a cafe, called The Apple Pie Bakery), a deli, Chinese takeaway, a Co-op, Indian takeaway, hair dressers, a car garage, a post office and a community store. The village also has a Community and Business Enterprise Hub built in 2025 and due to open to local businesses and public in 2026.

== Transport ==
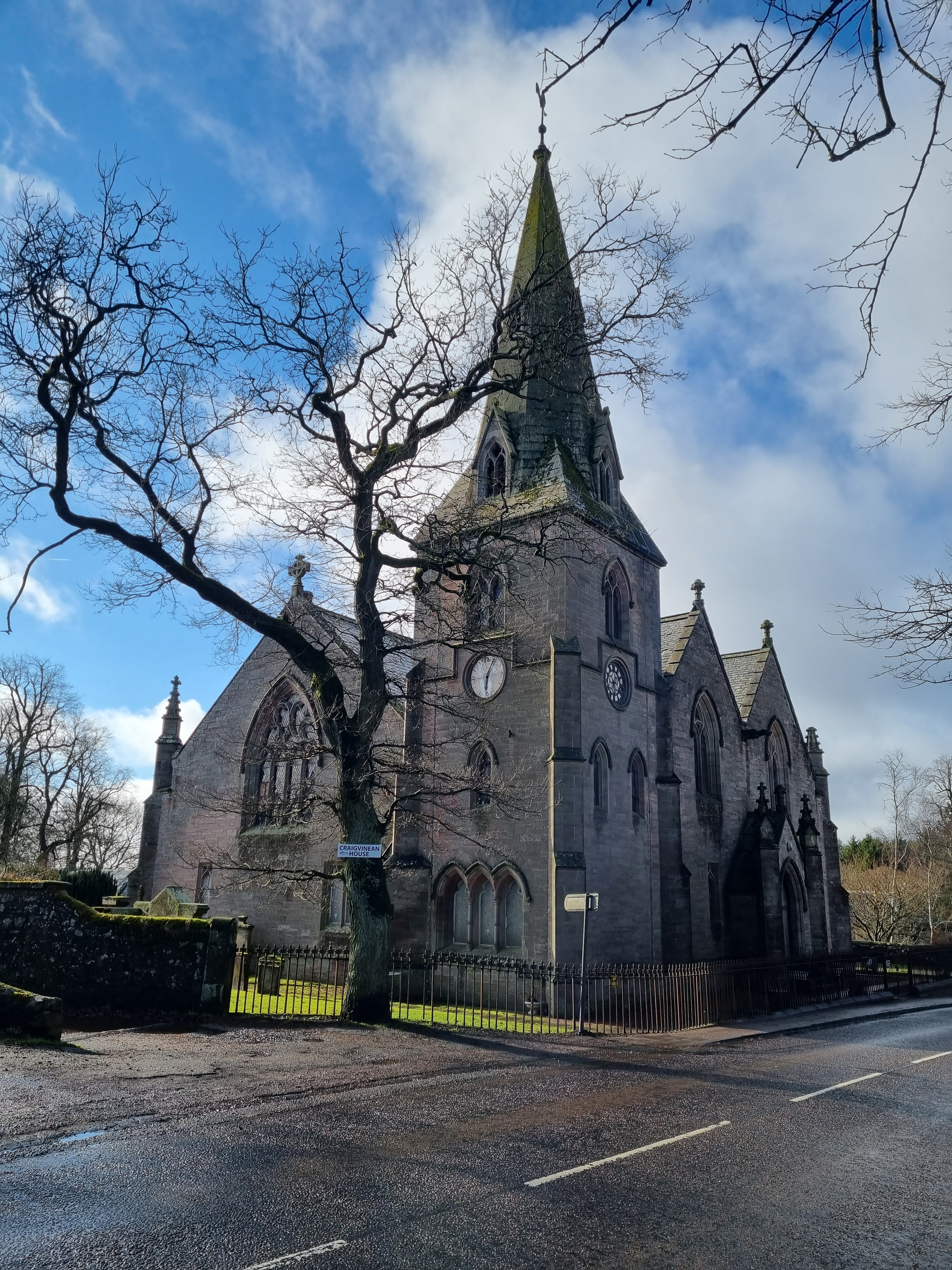
Carnwath Parish Church, built in 1869.

The A70 and A721 roads meet in the town.

Carnwath has no current rail access. Carnwath railway station was originally part of the Caledonian Railway, later the London, Midland and Scottish Railway and finally the Scottish Region of British Railways, was closed in the Beeching Axe of the 1960s. The nearest railway station is Carstairs railway station to the west of Carnwath.

== Education ==
There is a nursery school in the village which is part of the Biggar Learning Community, that includes the Biggar High School. A new primary school was built and opened in 2015.

== Culture and community ==
=== Red Hose 5 Mile Race ===
Carnwath hosts the Red Hose 5 Mile Race, the oldest customary foot race in Scotland, and possibly the world. It dates back to 13 March 1508. It has seen many changes over almost 500 years, but the running of The Red Hose is still a strong tradition in Carnwath. 'Hose' refers to stockings or long socks. Each year a foot race is run at Carnwath and the local Laird must provide a pair of red stockings as the prize.

=== Amenities ===
The "Sir John Mann" park is a public park and open space in the village (formerly Medwyn Park).

There is a playing field (King George's Field) with a sports pavilion in the village. The site was built in 1935 and is Category B listed. The site was formerly used by Carnwath Bowls Club.

=== In popular culture ===
Carnwath is mentioned twice in the traditional song We're No' Awa' Tae Bide Awa', also known as Carnwath Mill.

So we had a hauf an' anither hauf,
And then we had anither,
When he got fou' he shouted
"Hoo!
It's Carnwath Mill for ever."
For we're no' awa' tae bide awa' , etc.

And:-

So whenever friendly friens may meet,
Wherever Scots foregather,
We'll raise our gless, we'll shout
Hurroo,
It's Carnwath Mill for ever.

The allusion is obscure. Carnwath Mill is now a farm (and ruined mill) about 1 mile (1.5 kilometres) from Carnwath; alternatively, there was a lint mill at Carnwath erected in 1762; The song also alludes to Wilsontown, which was about 6 miles (10 kilometres) away.

== Notable people ==
Notable people from Carnwath include the first woman provost of Kirkintilloch, Jenny Coutts, the author and critic, Robert Anderson and the footballer, Tom Brownlee. The Ordnance Gazetteer remarks that: "the minor poet, James Graeme (1749–1772)" was a resident of the locality.

== See also ==
- Caledonian Amateur Football League, Balmore who form part of the league play at Carnwath Village Park
- Lanark Blue, a locally made sheep's milk cheese
- Clydesdale East (ward), local government electoral ward containing the village
- Cobbinshaw Reservoir, a Site of Special Scientific Interest (SSSI)
