= Ruth Perry (literary scholar) =

American literary scholar (born 1943)

Ruth Perry (born Ruth Ellen Opler April 5, 1943) is an American literary scholar who works on the literary and cultural history of eighteenth-century England and Scotland. She is known especially for her work on women’s writing. She is the Ann Fetter Friedlaender Professor of the Humanities Emeritus at the Massachusetts Institute of Technology (MIT) and past president of the American Society for Eighteenth-Century Studies.

== Education and career ==
Perry studied at Cornell University, double majoring in English and Social Psychology, and graduated Phi Beta Kappa and cum laude in 1963. She completed an MA in physiological psychology at Cornell in 1965. She began her academic career in 1964 at Ithaca College as a teaching assistant in child psychology. At the University of California, Santa Cruz, she received her PhD in 1974 in literature. In 1972, she took a job at MIT as a lecturer in literature; she was appointed an assistant professor in 1973, and an associate professor in 1980. After a contested tenure case in 1982, she became senior lecturer and Founding Director of the Women's Studies program (now Women and Gender Studies) in September 1984. In 1987, having published four books, Perry was appointed a full professor of literature with tenure at MIT. In 1992, she co-founded the Graduate Consortium in Women's Studies in Boston.

Perry conducts research on 18th century English literature and the role of socio-economic foundations in women's authorship. She has published on authors such as Jane Austen, Alexander Pope, Laurence Sterne, and Samuel Richardson. She has also published on contemporary authors such as Grace Paley and Mary Gordon. She rediscovered and wrote a major monograph on the early feminist Mary Astell. She edited a new edition of Charlotte Lennox's Henrietta. She has written a book on the 18th century Scottish ballad tradition bearer, Anna Gordon.

Perry has received a variety of grants, awards, and research funding, including a Woodrow Wilson Fellowship (1964). She received an award from the Bunting Institute (1978) and research funding from the National Endowment for the Humanities (1980) and the National Science Foundation (1984). She was a Guggenheim Fellow (1987) and won fellowships from the American Council of Learned Societies (1995), the Rockefeller Foundation in Bellagio (1999), the National Endowment for the Humanities (2007), and the Institute for Advanced Study in the Humanities in Edinburgh (2008). In 2000, she was elected President of the American Society for Eighteenth-Century Studies. In 2022, she received a Lifetime Achievement Award from the Eighteenth-Century Scottish Studies Society. She was a member of the advisory boards of PMLA (Publications of the Modern Language Association), The Women's Review of Books, and Tulsa Studies in Women's Literature. She is also a member of the Modern Language Association of America, American Society for Eighteenth-Century Studies, and the Eighteenth-Century Scottish Studies Society.

== Publications ==
=== Books ===
- The Ballad World of Anna Gordon, Mrs. Brown of Falkland. Oxford: Oxford University Press, 2025
- Novel Relations: The Transformation of Kinship in English Culture and Literature 1748-1818. Cambridge; New York: Cambridge University Press, 2004
- The Celebrated Mary Astell: An Early English feminist. Chicago: University of Chicago Press, 1986 Reviewed in the NYT
- Women, Letters, and the Novel. New York: AMS Press, 1980

=== Edited books ===
- A Life in Feminist Scholarship: Festschrift in Honour of Professor Janet Todd. Edited by Ruth Perry and Ros Ballaster. A special issue of Women’s Writing, 23, 3 (August 2016).
- Henrietta by Charlotte Lennox. Edited by Ruth Perry and Susan Carlile. Lexington: University of Kentucky Press, 2008.
- Ballads and Songs in the Eighteenth Century. A special issue of The Eighteenth Century: Theory and Interpretation 47, 2-3, (Summer/Fall 2006). Guest edited by Ruth Perry.
- Social Control and the Arts, ed. Susan Rubin Suleiman, Alice A. Jardine, Ruth Perry, Carla Mazzio. Cambridge: New Cambridge Press (1990).
- George Ballard, Memoirs of Several Ladies of Great Britain Celebrated for Their Skill in the Learned Language, Arts, and Sciences, ed. and intro. by Ruth Perry. Detroit: Wayne State University Press, 1985. With extensive bibliography.
- Mothering the Mind. Introduction by Ruth Perry and edited by Ruth Perry and Martine Brownley. New York: Holmes and Meier, 1984.
