= Jenny Coutts =

Scottish politician

- The inclusion of this photograph adds significantly to the article because the photo and its historical significance are the object of discussion in the article. Image from
- Born: 18 November 1909; Carnwath, Scotland
- Died: 18 March 2008 (aged 98); Kirkintilloch, Scotland
- Occupation: Politician
- Known for: Local Politics

Jenny Coutts (née Janet Maxwell Barclay) was the first female provost of Kirkintilloch.

== Early life and education ==
Janet Maxwell Barclay was both in Carnwath, Lanarkshire in 1909, the daughter of Gavin and Janet Barclay. She attended Lanark Grammar School, and later became a secretary, working in offices in Bath Street, Glasgow. She met her husband, Willie Coutts at the International Club. The couple and their two sons moved to Lenzie in 1949, where she became involved in local politics. Both Jenny and her husband were pacifists during World War II.

== Political career ==
She became an independent councillor for the area in 1958, by a majority of five votes. By 1964, she was provost of Kirkintilloch. in 1973, she was awarded an MBE for her services to social work. As a magistrate, she was known for her liberal approach to crime and punishment and was in favour of abstinence from alcohol. She believed that party politics had no place in local councils.
