= William Elstob =

English divine (1673–1715)

William Elstob (1673–1715), was an English divine and scholar.

== Life ==
Elstob was the son of Ralph Elstob, merchant of Newcastle upon Tyne, and was baptised at All Saints' Church, Newcastle, on 1 January 1673. The Elstob family claimed descent from ancient Welsh kings, and had long been settled in the diocese of Durham. Elstob was educated in Newcastle and at Eton. At the age of sixteen - on the advice of his uncle and guardian, Charles Elstob, prebendary of Canterbury from 1685 to 1721 - he was sent to Catharine Hall, Cambridge, "in a station below his birth and fortune". His health also suffered when at Catherine Hall, and so he left for Queen's College, Oxford, where he entered as a commoner and graduated B.A. in 1694. He was elected fellow of University College, Oxford on 23 July 1696, and took his M.A. degree on 8 June 1697. Hearne says that having failed of election to All Souls as a south country man, he 'became a northern man,' and was elected one of Skirlaw's fellows at University College. In 1702 he was presented by the dean and chapter of Canterbury, presumably through his uncle's influence, to the united parishes of St Swithin and St Mary Bothaw, London. Here he died, after a lingering illness, on 3 March 1714–15, and was buried in the chancel of St Swithin's. He was chaplain to Bishop Nicolson of Carlisle, who in February 1713 applied for Chief Justice Parker's influence for his appointment to the preachership at Lincoln's Inn.

Elstob was a linguist and antiquary, and especially skilled in Anglo-Saxon. He was a friend, probably a nephew, of the learned nonjuror, George Hickes, of Humphrey Wanley, Sir Andrew Fountaine, John Strype, and other men of learning. In 1701 he contributed a Latin translation of the homily of Lupus to the Dissertatio Epistolaris. Hickes wrote a preface to Elstob's Essay on the great Affinity and Mutual Agreement of the two professions of Divinity and Law, ... in vindication of the Clergy's concerning themselves in political matters. It is a defence of high-church principles. Sir Andrew Fountaine acknowledges Elstob's help in giving descriptions of Anglo-Saxon coins for the tables published by him in Hickes's Thesaurus. Elstob communicated to John Strype a copy of Sir John Cheke's Discourse upon Plutarch's Treatise on Superstition. This had been preserved in manuscript in the library of University College, and mutilated by Obadiah Walker. Elstob's version is appended to Strype's Life of Cheke. In 1703 Elstob published a new edition (much enlarged) of Roger Ascham's 'Letters'. In 1709 he contributed a Latin version of the Anglo-Saxon homily on the nativity of St Gregory to the edition of the original prepared by his younger sister Elizabeth Elstob. An Anglo-Saxon book of hours, with a translation by him, is appended to Letters between Hickes and a Roman Catholic priest. He made collections for a history of Newcastle and of "proper names formerly used in northern countries". He also made proposals for what was to be his great work, a new edition of the Anglo-Saxon laws already published by William Lambarde (1568) and Abraham Wheelocke (1644), with many additions, comments, prefaces, and glossaries. This design was stopped by his death, and afterwards executed bv David Wilkins, Leges Anglo-Saxoniæ, etc. (1721), who mentions Elstob's plan in his preface. Hickes also speaks of this plan in the dedication of his two volumes of posthumous sermons (1726). Elstob prepared a version of the Old English Orosius, which finally came into the hands of Daines Barrington. He printed a specimen of this at Oxford in 1699.

He also published two separate sermons in 1704 on the battle of Blenheim and the anniversary of the accession of Queen Anne. In Thomas Hearne's Collection of Curious Discourses by Eminent Antiquaries is a mock-heroic poem by Elstob upon the butler of University College.
