= The Ladies' Defence =

1701 book by Mary Chudleigh

The Ladies' Defence, Or, a Dialogue Between Sir John Brute, Sir William Loveall, Melissa, and a Parson, is an essay in verse published by Mary Chudleigh in 1701. The piece was written in response to a wedding sermon, The Bride-Woman's Counsellor, published by the minister John Sprint in 1700. The sermon insists that women's entire duty in life is to love, honor, and be obedient to a husband.

As an intellectual poet, Chudleigh felt that women were fit for nothing but subservience only because men held low expectations for them. In her feminist work, she advocates for increased educational opportunities for women and questions the psychological stifling that often happened as a result of women's near-servanthood in marriage.
