= Mary Chudleigh =

English feminist writer

Lady Mary Chudleigh
- Born: Mary Lee; August 1656
- Died: December 15, 1710; England
- Education: Self-educated
- Occupations: Poet, essayist
- Spouse(s): Sir George Chudleigh, 3rd Baronet (m. 1674)
- Children: At least 6
- Writing career
- Notable works: Poems on Several Occasions (1703); Essays Upon Several Subjects (1710)
- Movement: Early English feminism

Mary, Lady Chudleigh (née Mary Lee; August 1656 – September 15, 1710) was an English poet who belonged to an intellectual circle that included Mary Astell, Elizabeth Thomas, Judith Drake, Elizabeth Elstob, Lady Mary Wortley Montagu, and John Norris. In her later years she published a volume of poetry and two volumes of essays, all dealing with feminist themes. Two of her books were published in four editions during the last ten years of her life. Her poetry on the subject of human relationships and reactions has appeared in several anthologies. Her feminist essays are still in print.

== Biography ==
Mary Lee was born in Winslade, Devon, in August 1656, the daughter of Richard Lee and Mary Sydenham of Westminster. She was baptized in Clyst St George, a Devon parish, on 19 August 1656. She was the oldest of three siblings. Her mother came from the Sydenham family of Wynfold Eagle, Dorset. Lady Mary's uncle Colonel William Sydenham fought in the English Civil War on the side of Parliament. Her other uncle, Dr Thomas Sydenham, was known for his study of epidemic diseases and served as a physician to Anne Finch, Viscountess Conway. Her father was a man of property.

She married Sir George Chudleigh, 3rd Baronet (died 1718) of Ashton, Devon on 25 March 1674. Her biographers argue whether their marriage was happy; her references to marriage as a stifling trap for women suggest she may have had personal experience with an overbearing husband, yet he allowed her to publish several feminist works in his lifetime, and her unpublished work was saved by the family after her death. They had at least six children, including:

- Sir George Chudleigh, 4th Baronet (died 1738), eldest son and heir. He married Frances Davie (1697–1748.), a daughter and co-heiress of Sir William Davie, 4th Baronet (1662–1707) of Creedy House, Devon, by whom he had four daughters and co-heiresses.
- Col. Thomas Chudleigh, 2nd son, of Chelsea, London, whose son was Sir Thomas Chudleigh, 5th Baronet (died 1741) and whose daughter Elizabeth Chudleigh was wife of Augustus John Hervey, 3rd Earl of Bristol (1724–1779) and bigamous wife of Evelyn Pierrepont, 2nd Duke of Kingston-upon-Hull (1771–1773), who built "Chudleigh House" for her.
- Eliza Maria Chudleigh.

Like most women of her time, Mary Chudleigh had little formal education, but she read widely. and educated herself in theology, science, and philosophy. Little else is known of her life except that one daughter must have died young, as her grief is mentioned in her letters and some poetry. Mary Chudleigh died on 15 December 1710 of severe rheumatism.

== Literary works and reception ==
Critics had tended to read Chudleigh's work biographically, but that began to change in the 1990s, as new evidence on her life emerged. In her early career she could be called a Restoration poet of lyrics and satires, while later she became a philosophical essayist.

Heavily influenced by Mary Astell, Lady Mary Chudleigh was one of the first Englishwomen to recognize that as a social group, women faced unique challenges. She wrote overtly feminist works and argued strongly for marriage reform and women's education, believing women should cultivate reason, virtue and stoic integrity, despite living in a world full of misogyny. She also wrote significant poems in the retirement tradition, combining Platonic and Christian contemplation as a retreat from the vanities of life.

Chudleigh is no longer thought to have written the prose work The Female Advocate (1700), but expressed in her poetry praise for the "ingenious Pen" of the unknown, pseudonymous Eugenia who did so.

=== Individual works ===
The Ladies' Defence, Or, The Bride-Woman's Counsellor Answer'd: A Poem in a Dialogue Between Sir John Brute, Sir William Loveall, Melissa, and a Parson (London, 1701) analyses marriage from a woman's point of view. Not expecting men to give up their privilege, she urges women to avoid marriage and realize their self-worth.

Poems on Several Occasions (London, 1703): By dedicating this to Queen Anne, Chudleigh sought protection from potential backlash.

Essays Upon Several Subjects (London, 1710) urges women not to dwell on wealth, status, interest or ambition.

=== Collected works ===
- The Poems and Prose of Mary, Lady Chudleigh, ed. Margaret J. M. Ezell (New York: Oxford University Press, 1993).

=== Correspondence ===
- Elizabeth Thomas, Pylades and Corinna (London, 1731)
- The Poetical Works of Philip Late Duke of Wharton (London, 1731)
- British Library MSS Stowe 223, f. 398
- British Library MSS Stowe 224, f. 1

== Further information ==
=== Biography ===
- George Ballard, Memoirs of Several Ladies of Great Britain who have been Celebrated for their Writings or Skill in the Learned Languages, Arts and Sciences, ed. Ruth Perry (Detroit: Wayne State Univ. Press, 1985).

=== Anthologies ===
- Norton Anthology of Literature by Women: The Traditions in English, Sandra Gilbert and Susan Gubar, eds
- The First Feminists: British Women Writers, Moira Fergusson, ed. (Bloomington: Indiana University Press, 1985)
- Eighteenth Century Women Poets: An Oxford Anthology, Roger Lonsdale, ed. (New York: Oxford University Press, 1989)
- British Literature: An Anthology, Robert DeMaria, Jr, ed. (London: Blackwell, 1996)
