= James Graeme (poet) =

Scottish poet (1749–1772)

James Graeme (15 December 1749 – 26 July 1772) was a Scottish poet.

== Life ==
Graeme was born 15 December 1749, at Carnwath in Lanarkshire, the fourth and youngest son of William Graeme, a farmer of the middle class. As a child he was delicate, and his parents educated him for the ministry. After being taught to read in a dame's school, he was sent to the grammar schools of Carnwath, Libberton, and Lanark.

In 1767 he went to the University of Edinburgh, where he studied for three years. His friend and biographer, Robert Anderson (1750–1830), says that he excelled in classical learning, and made a special study of metaphysics, besides reading widely in general literature. In 1769 he was presented to a bursary at the University of St Andrews, but soon resigned it, and, returning to Edinburgh next year, entered the theological class. In 1771 he became tutor to the sons of Major Martin White of Milton, near Lanark. He died of tuberculosis at Carnwath on 26 July 1772.

== Works ==
His poems consisted of elegies and miscellaneous pieces. His poetical reputation is due to Anderson, who printed his friend's poems after his death, together with some of his own, in Poems on Several Occasions, Edinburgh, 1773. They reappeared in Robert Anderson's Poets of Great Britain, vol. xi., and in Richard Alfred Davenport's British Poets, vol. lxxi.; a selection is given in The Works of the British Poets, edited by Thomas Park, vol. v.
