= Gus Alexander =

Scottish footballer (1934–2010)

Personal information
- Full name: Angus Charles Alexander
- Date of birth: 10 January 1934
- Place of birth: Arbroath, Scotland
- Date of death: 1 January 2010 (aged 75)
- Place of death: Workington, England
- Height: 5 ft 9 in (1.75 m)
- Position: Wing half

Senior career*
Years	Team	Apps	(Gls)
1950–1957	Burnley	0	(0)
1957–1958	Southport	14	(1)
1958–1959	Workington	49	(4)
1959–1960	York City	7	(0)
- * Club domestic league appearances and goals

Angus Charles Alexander (10 January 1934 – 3 January 2010) was a Scottish footballer who played as a wing half.

He joined Burnley in 1950 as an amateur, signing as a professional a year later. He made no first team appearances for Burnley after leaving for Southport in 1957. After less than a year at Southport, he moved to Workington, where he made nearly 50 league appearances. A move to York City saw him finish his Football League career, where he made seven appearances. After retiring from football, Alexander worked in the steel industry for a number of years before retiring in the 1990s.

== Career ==
Born in Arbroath, Angus, Alexander started his career with Arbroath YC before joining Burnley as an amateur on 5 July 1950 and signing a professional contract on 25 January 1951. Although he was considered an understudy to Jimmy McIlroy, he made no first team appearances for Burnley, and served his National Service from 1952 to 1954 in Cyprus and Suez while playing football for the British Army. After completing his military service, he joined Southport for a four-figure fee in July 1957. He made 14 appearances and scored one goal in the league before the club placed him on the transfer list because he was dissatisfied with playing reserve team football. He signed for Workington in February 1958 in exchange for Tommy Kinloch, making 49 appearances and scoring four goals in the league.

Alexander joined York City in June 1959 as part of an exchange deal which saw Tom Brownlee move to Workington. After making seven appearances for York he left the club in 1960, and subsequently worked for the Distington Engineering Company. He had trials with his former club Workington in December 1961, but the club was unable to afford to sign him. He made no further professional appearances. After working in the steel industry for 14 years and then at a printing firm, he took early retirement in the early 1990s. He died in Workington on 3 January 2010 at the age of 75 after suffering from an illness.
