= Red Hose Run =

The Red Hose Run is a cross country running race that is held annually in Carnwath, South Lanarkshire in Scotland.

Held annually since 1508, the Red Hose is considered by Guinness World Records to be the oldest continuously run foot race in the world. The race has been held every year except during World War I, World War II, and the Foot and Mouth disease outbreaks in 1926 and 1952.

The requirement to hold the Red Hose is stipulated in a royal charter. The origin story says that James IV granted the lands of Carnwath under the stipulation that a pair of red hose must be granted to the fastest man to run from the east of Carnwath to Calla Cross. If the local laird wishes to cancel it, he must get the permission of the Lord Chamberlain.

The first prize is a pair of red hose, provided by the laird.

Names of winners were recorded beginning in 1830, while winning times were only recorded since 2003. Since 2003, the race distance has varied from 3 kilometres (1.9 mi) to 4.5 km. Separate women's winners were recorded since 2011.
