= Anna Gordon (ballad collector) =

Anna Gordon (24 August 1747 – 14 July 1810), also known as Mrs Brown or Mrs Brown of Falkland, was one of the most important British ballad sources.

== Life ==
The facts of Anna Gordon's life have been set out in a 2025 biography by Ruth Perry, titled The Ballad World of Anna Gordon, Mrs. Brown of Falkland. She was born in Old Aberdeen, youngest daughter to Lilias Forbes of Disblair and her husband Thomas Gordon (1714–1797), who was the professor of Humanity at King's College, Aberdeen. Educated to a high level by her father, she was a cultivated and well-read woman. On 13 December 1788 she married the Revd. Dr Andrew Brown (c. 1744–1805), who, following work as a chaplain in the army, became minister of Falkland, Fife (1784–1802), and then Tranent. Thus Anna Gordon is widely known among scholars as Mrs. Brown of Falkland.

However, Anna Gordon is famed as a foundational source of Scottish ballads. Thirty-five of her ballads, now considered to form the core of the Scottish ballad canon, were committed to paper sometime between 1782 and 1801; some were published by Sir Walter Scott in Minstrelsy of the Scottish Border (1802-3) and Robert Jamieson in Popular Ballads and Songs (1806). Anna Gordon supplied many of the ‘A’ texts in Francis James Child's magisterial English and Scottish Popular Ballads (1882–98).

Anna Gordon's repertoire raises important questions about the nature of learning, transmission, and personal creativity in a still-living traditional art form. She learned her songs in childhood from her mother, her mother's sister Anne Forbes (Mrs. Farquharson of Allanaquoich), and from a number of servants in Disblair and Allanaquoich. She later stated that she had never seen any of these ballads in print but had them all by oral-aural transmission. But at the same time, she had contact with much cultivated music-making. Her father was a playing member of the Aberdeen Musical Society where the works of Handel and Corelli were regularly performed. This was a separate world from the domestic and woman-centered context in which Anna Gordon learned her songs. Indeed, her father later expressed "surprise at his daughter's skill in balladry and confessed that the words and tunes were previously unknown to him (as they were to his correspondent, the antiquary William Tytler, 1711–1792)."

== Literary significance ==
The outstanding quality of Anna Gordon's ballads has long been recognized. The compressed power of the action, vividness of detail, dramatic juxtapositions, narrative coherence—all these have attracted attention. So their literary significance is undisputed, but its precise character has been a matter of considerable debate:

The ballad repertoire of Anna Gordon...has generated both admiration and controversy since the end of the eighteenth century, when the texts were first recorded...Francis James Child...gave her variants pride of place in The English and Scottish Popular Ballads as instances of the best the popular ballad tradition had to offer. In the twentieth century, the differences between her renditions of several specific ballads became the focus of scholarly attention—held up by Bertrand Bronson as examples of oral re-creation and subsequently used by other scholars as ammunition in the conflict over the applicability of oral-formulaic theory to European balladry.

According to Ruth Perry's biography, Anna Gordon's ballads are often framed from an explicitly female, indeed even feminist, perspective. Two-thirds of them are women's stories. Women have power and agency. Their intelligence and resourcefulness enable them to outwit powerful men. Sometimes the conflict turns on an inter-generational struggle between younger and more powerful older women. Even when men are protagonists their adversaries are frequently women wielding supernatural power; when men flout women's injunctions they get into trouble. In the ballad world of Anna Gordon, women have sexual encounters outside of marriage, become pregnant and have children, all without meeting disaster, or, indeed, much in the way of censure.

== Books and Editions ==
Ruth Perry, The Ballad World of Anna Gordon, Mrs. Brown of Falkland (Oxford: Oxford University Press, 2025) ISBN 9780198939092

The standard edition of Anna Gordon's ballads is The Ballad Repertoire of Anna Gordon, Mrs Brown of Falkland, ed. by Sigrid Rieuwerts, The Scottish Text Society, Fifth Series, 8 (Woodbridge: Boydell and Brewer, 2011) ISBN 978-1-89797-632-6.

== Sources ==
William Donaldson, ‘Gordon, Anna (1747–1810)’, Oxford Dictionary of National Biography (Oxford University Press, 2004): doi:10.1093/ref:odnb/55496.

Julie Henigan, review of The Ballad Repertoire of Anna Gordon, Mrs. Brown of Falkland, ed. by Sigrid Rieuwerts, The Scottish Text Society, Fifth Series, 8 (Woodbridge: Boydell and Brewer, 2011) ISBN 978-1-89797-632-6, in JFR: Journal of Folklore Research, An International Journal of Folklore and Ethnomusicology (2011), http://www.jfr.indiana.edu/review.php?id=1305.
