= Richard Gwinnett =

English dramatist

Richard Gwinnett (1675-1717) was an English dramatist.

Gwinnett was the son of George Gwinnett of Shurdington, Gloucestershire. He was a pupil of Francis Gastrell at Christ Church, Oxford. He remained there some seven years, when he proceeded to London, and took rooms in the Temple, although he was in no way connected with the legal profession. While in London he became engaged to Elizabeth Thomas, well known as Dryden's 'Corinna,' but owing to his consumptive tendencies the marriage was postponed, and he withdrew to his father's residence in Gloucestershire. During the next sixteen years (1700–16) much correspondence passed between the lovers, Mrs. Thomas writing as 'Corinna,' Gwinnett as 'Pylades.' Their letters were subsequently published in two volumes entitled 'Pylades and Corinna; or memoirs of the lives, amours, and writings of R. G. and Mrs. E. Thomas, jun.... containing the letters and other miscellaneous pieces in prose and verse, which passed between them during a Courtship of above sixteen years ... Published from their original manuscripts (by Philalethes) ... To which is prefixed the life of Corinna, written by herself.' In 1716, on the death of his father, Gwinnett returned to London to press his suit, but the wedding was again deferred owing to the illness of the lady's mother. Early in the following spring Gwinnett suffered a relapse, and died on 16 April 1717.

He was the author of a play entitled 'The Country Squire, or a Christmas Gambol,' first published in the second volume of 'Pylades and Corinna,' the collected correspondence of Gwinnett and Elizabeth Thomas, London, 1732. Another edition of the play appeared in 1734. Portraits of Gwinnett were engraved by Van der Gucht and G. King for the 'Pylades and Corinna' volumes.
