= Lanark Grammar School =

Coordinates: 55°40′09″N 3°46′16″W

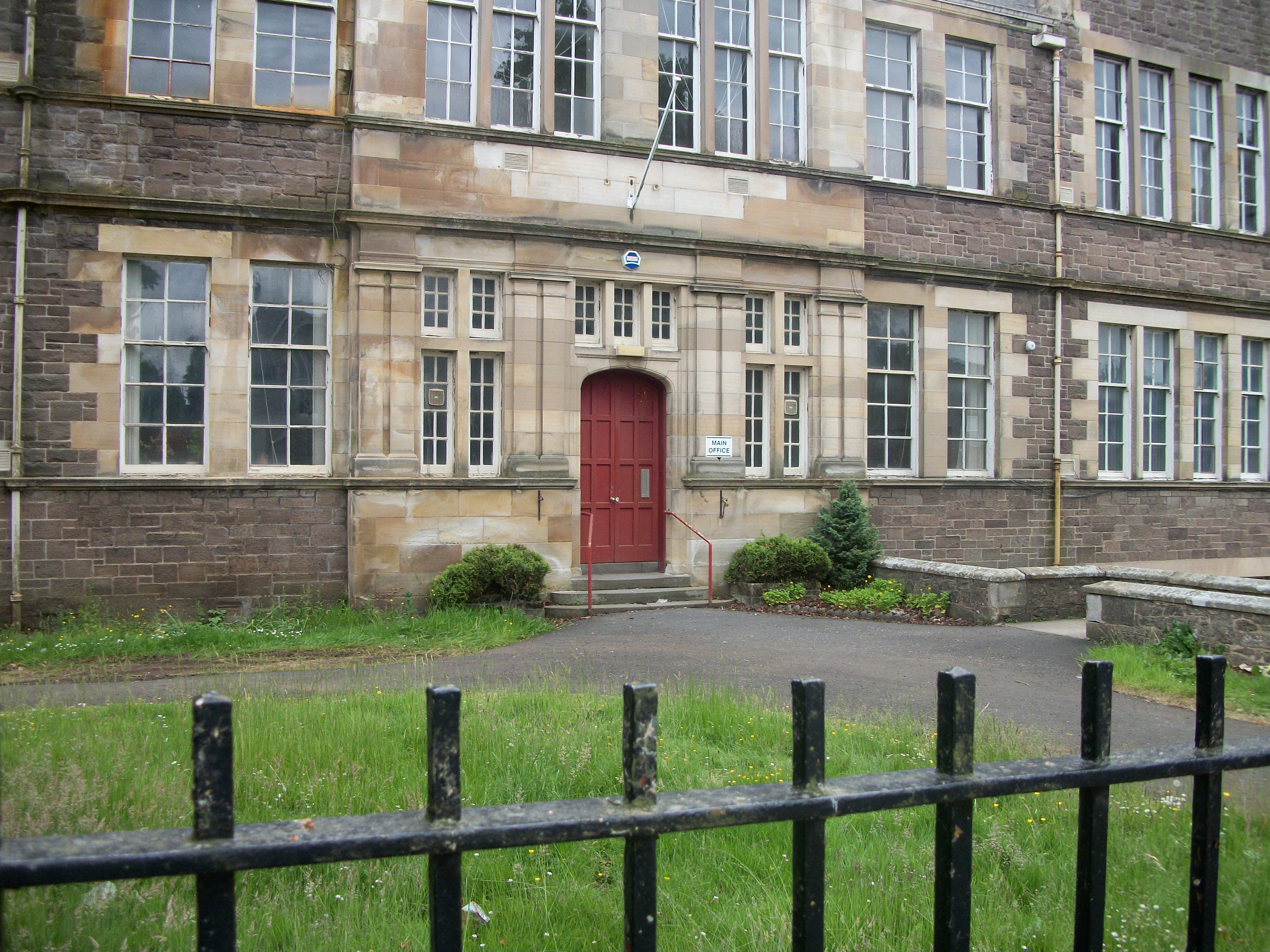
- Image of the previous Albany Drive building, since demolished.

Location
- Kirklands Road; Lanark, South Lanarkshire, ML11 9AJ; Scotland

Information
- Type: Secondary School
- Motto: Learning growing succeeding
- Established: 1183; 843 years ago
- Local authority: South Lanarkshire Council
- Head teacher: Jeff Warden
- Staff: 102.8 (on an FTE basis)
- Years: S1-S6
- Gender: Co-educational
- Age: 11 to 18
- Enrolment: 1142
- Houses: Hyndford , Braxfield , Jerviswood , Wallace , Lockhart and Clyde .
- Colours: Red, black, grey
- Accreditation: Scottish Qualifications Authority
- Website: www.lanark.s-lanark.sch.uk

Lanark Grammar School is a secondary school in Lanark, Scotland. It was founded in 1183, and celebrated its octocentenary in 1983, including a visit by The Princess Anne. The school draws its pupils from the town of Lanark and many villages in the local area, including Douglas, Carstairs and Braehead.

The Head Teacher is Jeff Warden, who took over in January 2022 following Mark Sherry who served 17 years in post.

The school has 6 houses: Lockhart, Jerviswood, Wallace, Hyndford, Braxfield and Clyde, pupils are sorted into these by tutor group upon the first day of term. There are around 100 teachers (FTE) and around 1100 students.

== History ==
Lanark Grammar School has a long history, being nearly 830 years old, making it one of the oldest schools in Scotland. Over the years, it has been housed in many buildings.

=== Parish Church (1183 – 15th century) ===
The town's Parish Church was used as the first school house. Until 1893, Lanark Grammar was a fee-paying school and until 1884 it was for boys only. From its beginnings in the Parish Church, the school would usually have only two teachers at a time until 1884. The only recorded exception to this was in the 1770s when Robert Thomson is reported to have a second assistant.

=== Bloomgate Building (15th century - 1650) ===
The Bloomgate building was the first building specifically erected for use as Lanark Grammar School. It was built in the 15th century and stood on the site of what is now the Clydesdale Hotel.

=== Lanark Horsemarket (1841–1884) ===
For a short spell in the 19th century, the Lanark Horsemarket was the home of Lanark Grammar. There are few records available related to this site.

=== Hyndford Road Building (August 1884 - December 2003) ===
The Hyndford Road building was opened in August 1884. This building was large enough to accommodate both girls and boys, and Lanark Grammar School became a co-educational facility. On 18 February 1888, the school "went up in flames" and was closed. Students were displaced to temporary accommodation while the school was rebuilt. Work was complete by the end of the summer holidays. During reconstruction, the school was expanded with room for ninety pupils of primary school age. The building was in use up until December 2003.

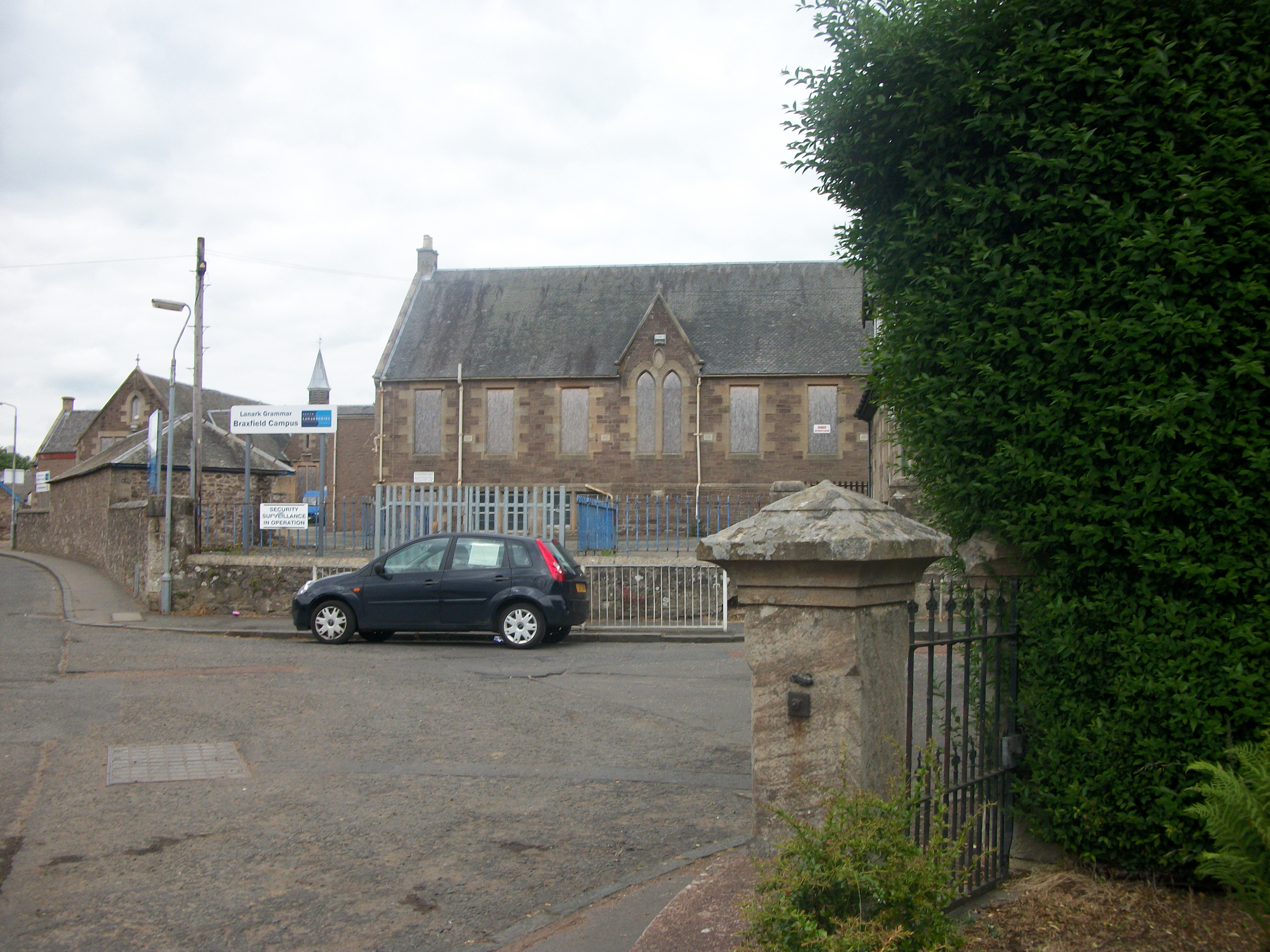
The Hyndford Road building, after the grounds were used to house the Braxfield Campus.

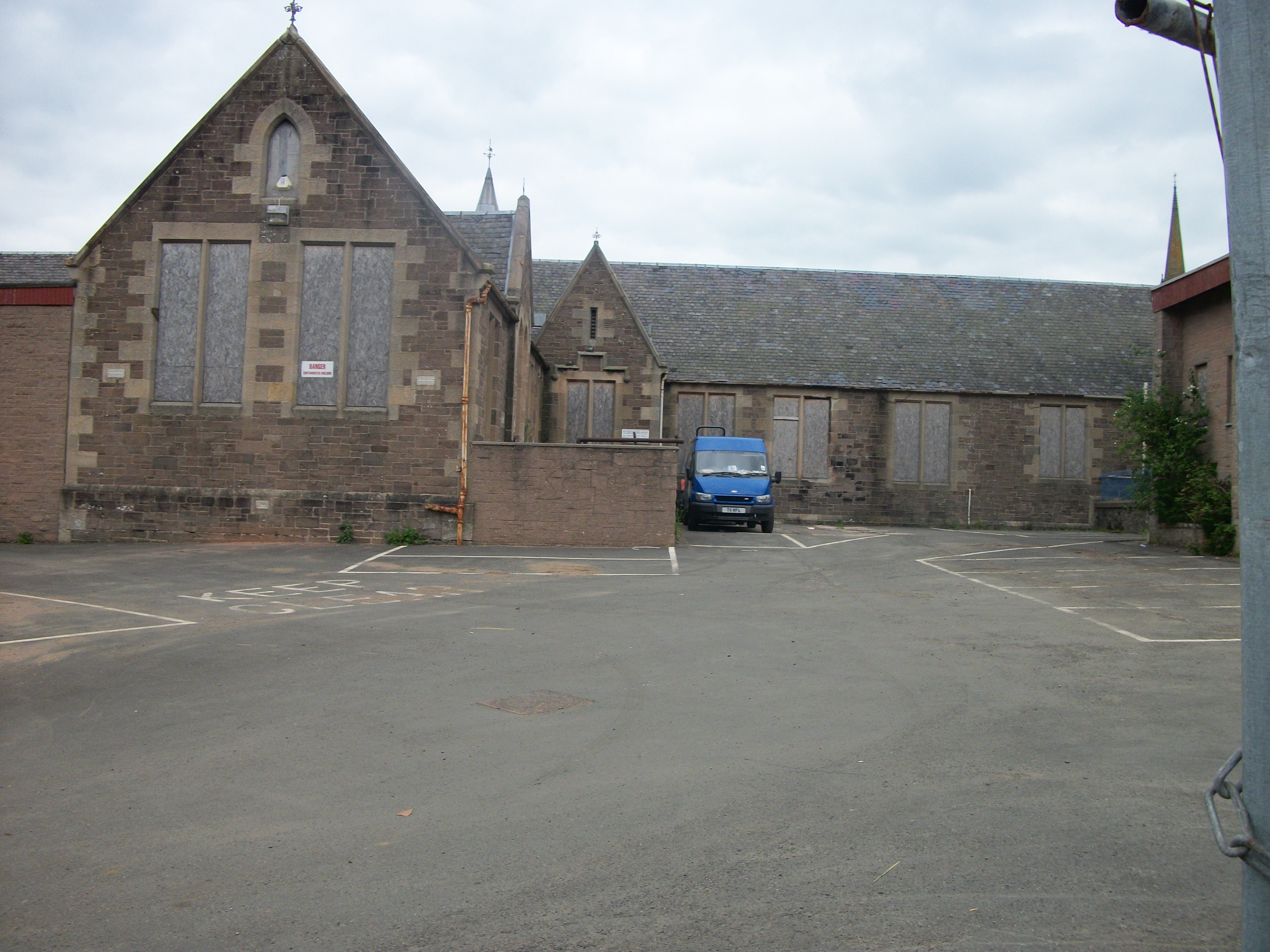
View of the building showing the old bike sheds and the car park of the Braxfield Campus.

=== Albany Drive Building (September 1914 - December 2009) ===
The Albany Drive building was opened on Wednesday 16 September 1914. It was in use for just over 95 years when it was closed on 22 December 2009.

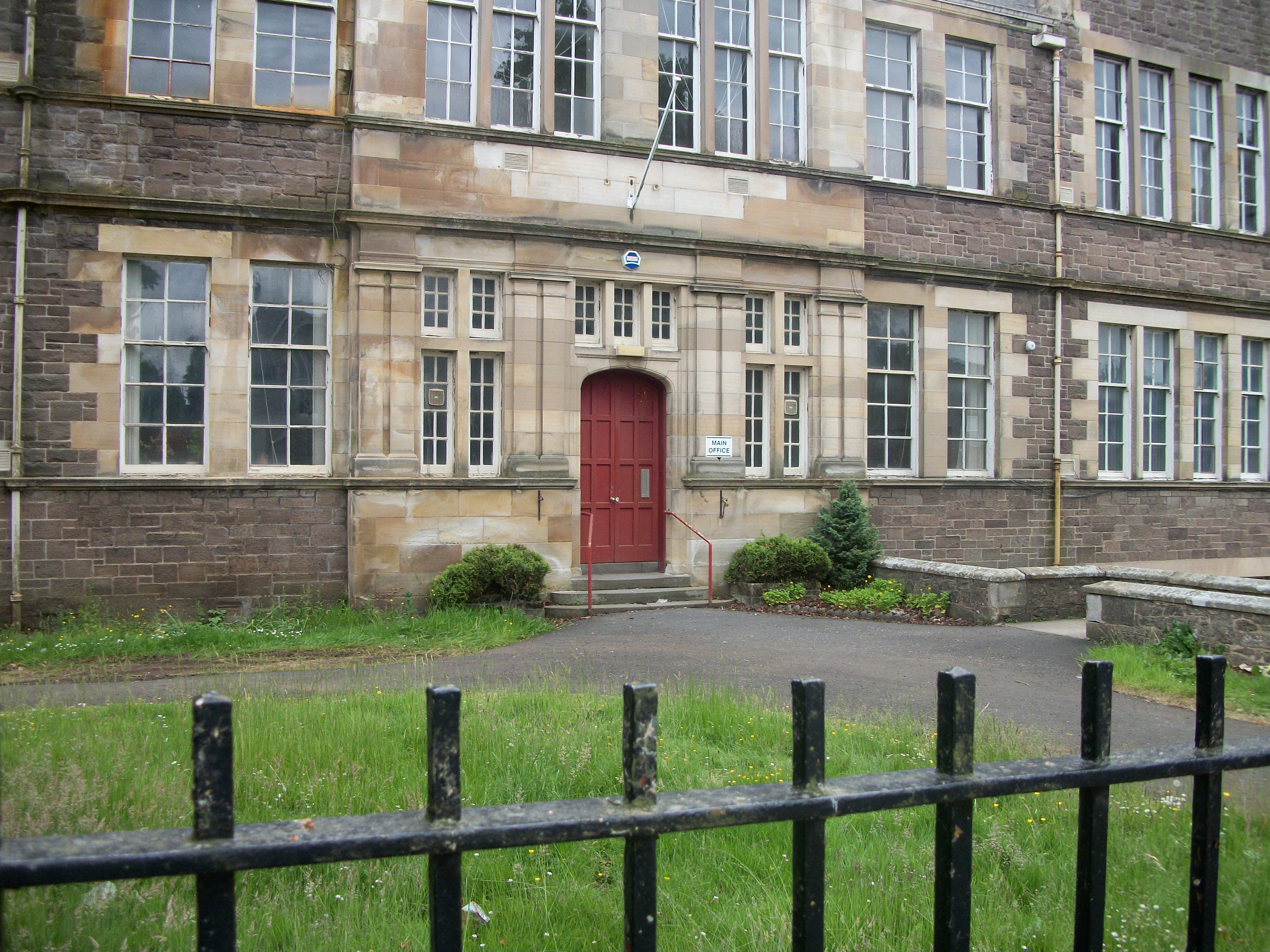
Front of the building, after its closure.

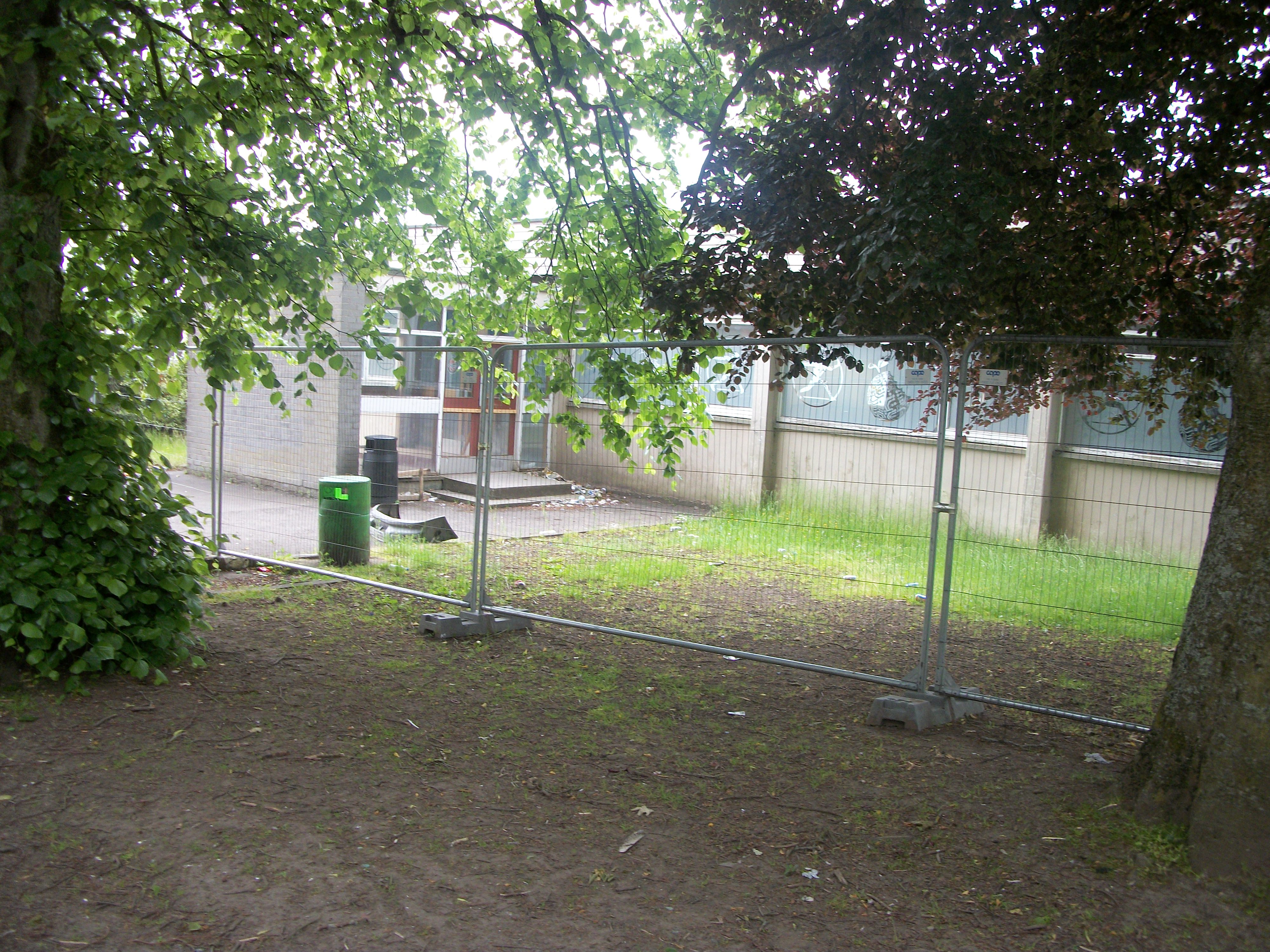
Canteen building of the Albany Drive Campus.

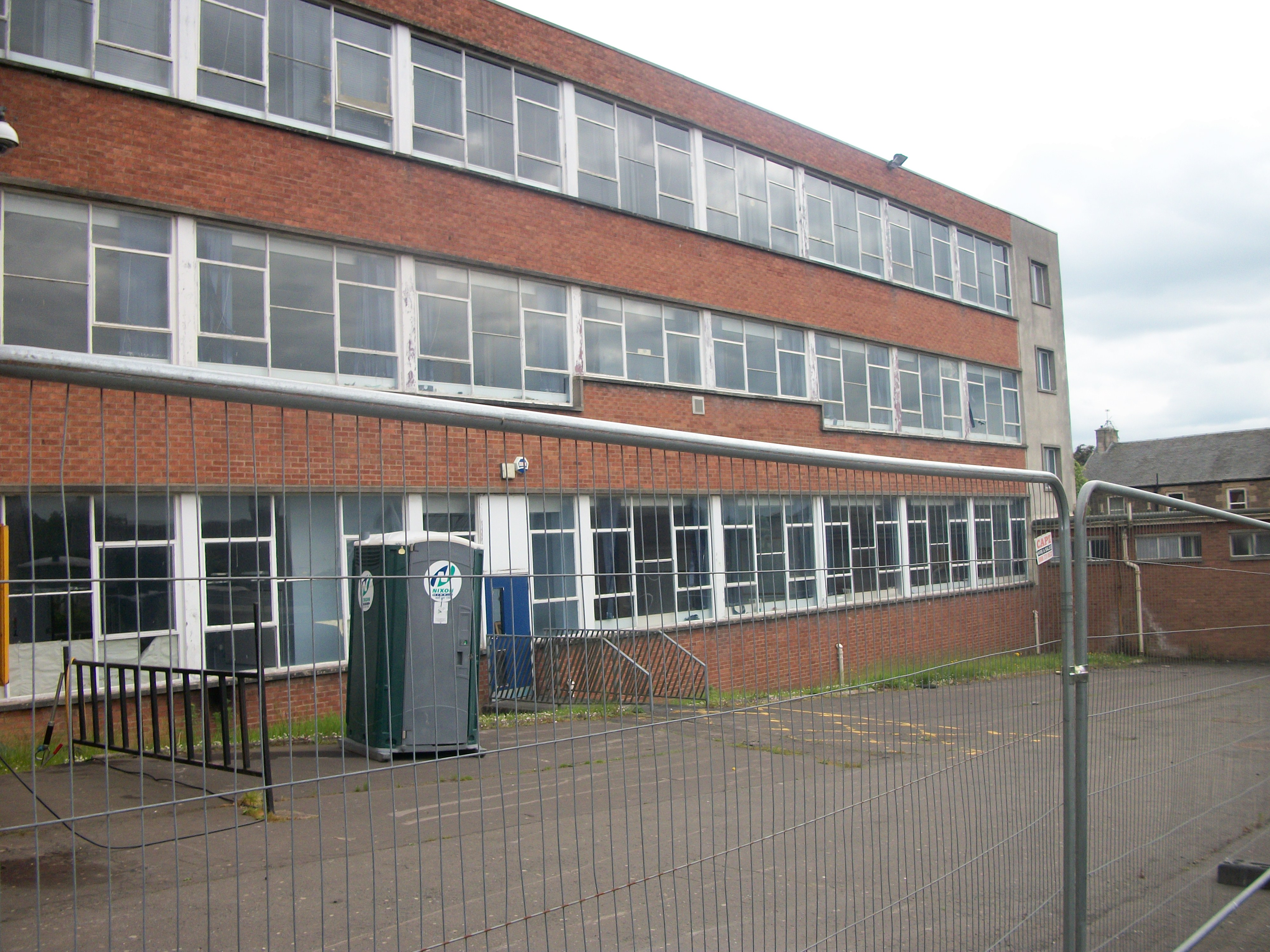
Science block, built in the 1970s.

=== Modular Village (August 2007 - December 2009) ===
During this period a modular village structure was constructed using portacabins around the recently condemned old science building that was deemed unsafe after it was discovered that it contained asbestos.

=== Kirklands Road Building (January 2010 - present) ===
This school was built by South Lanarkshire Council under their School Modernisation initiative. Many schools, including Robert Owen Memorial Primary School and Carluke High School have already been rebuilt as part of this programme. Prior to the project, many school buildings were becoming unsafe and others had been built when class sizes were much larger. Once complete, all schools in the area will have a similar design and will have facilities of the same standard.

The Lanark Grammar Project was completed between August and December 2009, and pupils and staff moved to the new building in January 2010 in order to minimise disruption as resources could be moved and unpacked during the holiday period. Staff returned to the building on Tuesday 5 January 2010. Pupils returned shortly thereafter.

Lanark Grammar now also contains an ASN wing in which pupils who have special teaching requirements can be educated. This has allowed for the integration of Lanark Grammar School with the pupils and staff of Craighead and Victoria Park, two special needs secondary schools.

== Notable former pupils ==
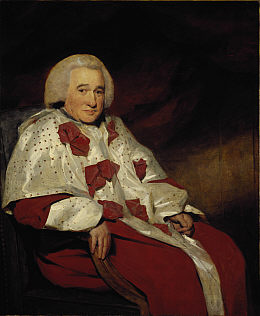
Lord Braxfield

- Jenny Coutts, first female provost of Kirkintilloch
- Robert McQueen, Lord Braxfield (18th Century) – a Lord Justice Clerk and expert in feudal law.
- William Smellie (18th century) – a famous obstetrician, often referred to as "the father of British midwifery".
- General William Roy (18th century) – contributor to the Ordnance Survey project
- John Glaister (19th century) – forensic scientist
- Colin McRae - World Rally Champion

== HMIe inspections ==
In 2004 Lanark Grammar School was inspected by HMIe and received mostly positive criticism. Its key strengths included:

- Staff were committed to the school and its pupils.
- The relations between teachers and pupils were good.
- There was a wide range of extra-curricular activities.
- Children with special education needs were integrated with the other pupils.
- The quality of support for learning.
- The senior managers, staff and pupils were involved in the school's self-evaluation process.

== See also ==
- List of the oldest schools in the United Kingdom
- List of the oldest schools in the world
