= Lanark Blue =

Semi-hard Scottish sheep's milk cheese

- Country of origin: Scotland
- Region, town: Lanarkshire, Carnwath
- Source of milk: Sheep
- Pasteurised: No
- Texture: Semi-Hard
- Aging time: ~3 months
- Named after: Lanark

Lanark Blue is a sheep milk cheese produced in Lanarkshire, Scotland.

Produced at Ogcastle near to the village of Carnwath by Humphrey Errington since 1985, it is a rich blue-veined artisan cheese. Made from the cheesemaker's own flock's produce, it is one of the first blue ewe's milk cheeses produced in Britain since the Middle Ages.

Using Penicillium roqueforti, to create the veining, it has a strong flavour that varies according to the time of year that the cheese is made.

== See also ==
- List of British cheeses
