= Tom Brownlee =

Scottish footballer (1935–2018)

Personal information
- Full name: Thomas Courtney Brownlee
- Date of birth: 21 May 1935
- Place of birth: Carnwath, Scotland
- Date of death: 16 December 2018 (aged 83)
- Position: Centre forward

Youth career
- Broxburn Athletic

Senior career*
Years	Team	Apps	(Gls)
1956	Alloa Athletic (trial)	1	(2)
1957–1958	Walsall	30	(14)
1958–1959	York City	9	(2)
1959–1961	Workington	25	(2)
1961–1964	Netherfield		
1964–1966	Bradford City	25	(15)
- Netherfield
Total		90	(35)
- * Club domestic league appearances and goals

Thomas Courtney Brownlee (21 May 1935 – 16 December 2018) was a Scottish professional footballer who played as a centre forward.

Brownlee's career started at Broxburn Athletic before he moved to England, with Walsall. His career then took him to York City, Workington in an exchange deal with Gus Alexander, non-league Netherfield and Bradford City, where he was the club's top goal-scorer in 1964–65 scoring 14 goals in just 18 games. After just seven games the following season he returned to Netherfield.

Brownlee was born in Carnwath, Scotland, in May 1935 and died in December 2018 at the age of 83.
