= Poems on Several Occasions (Lady Mary Chudleigh) =

Poem

Poems on Several Occasions was a poetry collection, published by the intellectual feminist, Lady Mary Chudleigh in 1703. The primary subject of the collection is the joys of friendship between women when that friendship is based on shared morals and shared intellectual pursuits; although, there are also poems on various other topics.
