= Mary Astell =

English feminist philosopher and writer (1666–1731)

- Born: 12 November 1666; Newcastle upon Tyne, England
- Died: 9 May 1731 (aged 64); Chelsea, London, England

Philosophical work
- Era: 17th-century philosophy
- Region: Western philosophy
- School: Rationalism
- Main interests: Social philosophy; Epistemology; Metaphysics; Pedagogy

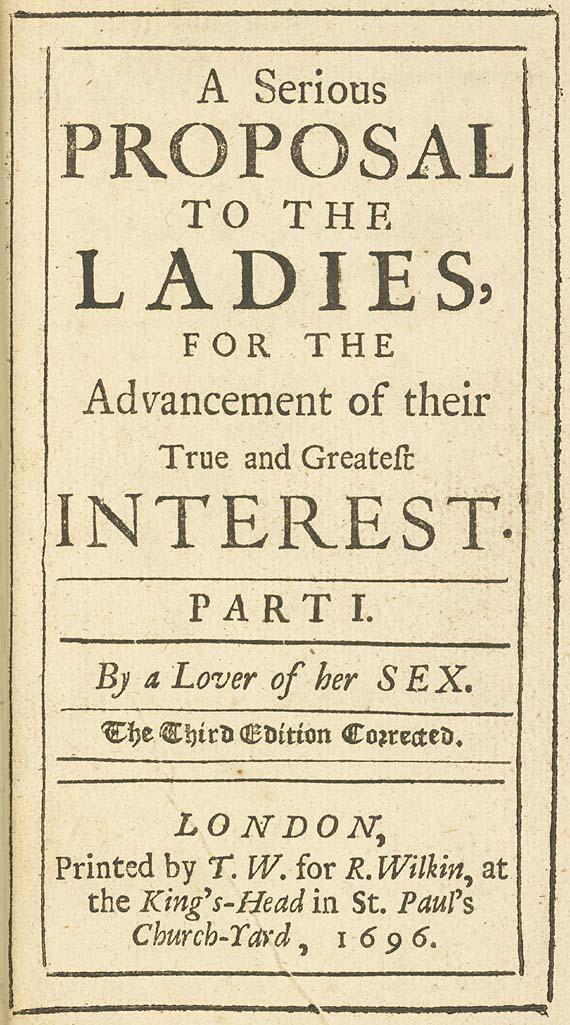
Title page from the third edition of A Serious Proposal

Mary Astell (12 November 1666 – 9 May 1731) was an English proto-feminist author, philosopher, and rhetorician who advocated for equal educational opportunities for women. Astell was born in a small city of the United Kingdom, called New Castle, and spent her adulthood in the capital city of United Kingdom, London. Astell is primarily remembered as one of England's inaugural advocates for women's rights and some commentators consider her to have been "the first English feminist". Through her philosophical writings, she challenged the assumption that women were intellectually inferior to men, arguing that women possessed the same capacity for reason and intellectual development. Her most influential work, A Serious Proposal to the Ladies (1694), proposed establishing an educational institution exclusively for women where they could develop their intellectual and moral abilities. She also criticized the inequalities within marriage in Some Reflections upon Marriage (1700), emphasizing the importance of education and reason in women's ability to make informed decisions. Her work helped establish an early philosophical foundation for arguments concerning women's intellectual equality and independence.

Astell's works, particularly A Serious Proposal to the Ladies and Some Reflections Upon Marriage, argue for the fundamental intellectual equality between men and women. Her philosophical writings are thought to have influenced subsequent generations of educated women, including the literary group known as the Bluestockings, whose discussions of literature, science, and philosophy often centred on issues related to women's education and equality. Astell, who never married, formed the majority of her close personal relationships with women. During the early 1700s, she withdrew from public life and dedicated herself to planning and managing a charitable school for girls. Astell viewed herself as self-reliant and took pride in advancing her mission to rescue her gender from oppression.

Despite Astell's contribution to the feminist cause, there is a notable tension in the broader body of scholarship when it comes to categorising her as the unequivocal "first English feminist". This discrepancy arises due to Astell's conflicting intellectual commitments. In addition to her belief in women's inherent intellectual potential and her thorough exploration of the perils of oppressive husbands, Mary Astell was a staunch High Tory, a conservative pamphleteer, and an advocate for the doctrine of passive obedience. Even during their initial publication, her strongest political views may have seemed outdated and out of touch with the prevailing beliefs of the time. Furthermore, her emphasis on the importance of religion to female friendship and feminist thought has rankled contemporary critics of her work.

== Early life ==
Few records of Mary Astell's life have survived. As biographer Ruth Perry explains: "As a woman she had little or no business in the world of commerce, politics, or law. She was born, she died; she owned a small house for some years; she kept a bank account; she helped to open a charity school in Chelsea: these facts the public listings can supply." Although Perry uncovered letters and manuscript fragments, she notes that if Astell had not written to wealthy aristocrats who could afford to pass down entire estates, very little of her life would have survived.

Astell was born in Newcastle upon Tyne on 12 November 1666, to Peter and Mary (Errington) Astell. Her parents had two other children, William, who died in infancy, and Peter, her younger brother. She was baptised in St John's Church in Newcastle. Her family was upper-middle class and lived in Newcastle throughout her early childhood. Her father was a coal merchant, a clerk within the Hostmen of Newcastle upon Tyne, and a conservative royalist Anglican. Mary's maternal grandfather was also a coal merchant and a member of the Hostmen guild. Due to her family's success in the coal business, her family had grown to achieve relative affluence. At the time of Mary's birth, her family was not part of the gentry. Within a year of Mary's birth her family would be elevated in status after an ancestor's augmentation. Mary received no formal education, although she did receive an informal education from her uncle Ralph Astell; he was a Cambridge graduate and a former clergyman whose alcoholism had prompted his suspension from the Church of England. Although suspended from the Church, he was affiliated with the Cambridge-based philosophical school that based its teachings around philosophers such as Aristotle, Plato, and Pythagoras. Her father died when she was 12 years old, leaving her without a dowry. With the remainder of the family finances invested in her brother's higher education, Mary and her mother moved to live with Mary's aunt.

After moving in with her aunt, little is known about Mary Astell's life until she was in her early twenties. It is possible that she continued to receive informal education from her uncle, but there is no concrete evidence. It is not known whether she had any close friends or was involved in any romantic relationships. It is unclear whether she was involved in any political or social causes during this time, although her later writings suggest an interest in issues related to women's education and equality.

== Career ==
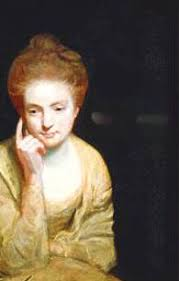
No portrait of Astell remains but Joshua Reynolds' study for the portrait of a young woman (c. 1760–65) in the Kunsthistorisches Museum, Vienna, was used as the cover illustration of The Eloquence of Mary Astell (2005) by Christine Mason Sutherland

Several years after the death of her aunt in 1684, Astell alone moved to London, possibly because of the political unrest that took place between 1686-1688 in Newcastle. In London, she became acquainted with a circle of literary and influential women, including Lady Mary Chudleigh, Elizabeth Thomas, Judith Drake, Elizabeth Elstob, and Lady Mary Wortley Montagu. These women helped develop and publish her work, as did William Sancroft, previously Archbishop of Canterbury. Bound by his previous oath to James II, he refused to swear allegiance to William III after the 1688 Glorious Revolution and became a Nonjuror. He provided financial support for Astell and an introduction to her future publisher. Astell later dedicated a collection of poetry to him.

During this time, it is believed that Astell may have spent some time at a convent in France, where she was exposed to ideas about education and independence for women. She was one of the first English women, following Bathsua Makin, to advocate the idea that women are as rational as men, and just as deserving of education. First published anonymously and signed "By a Lover of her Sex" in 1694, her A Serious Proposal to the Ladies for the Advancement of their True and Greatest Interest presents a plan for an all-female college where women could pursue a life of the mind. In 1697, she published part 2 to her A Serious Proposal "Wherein a Method is offered for the Improvement of their Minds".

In 1700, Astell published Some Reflections upon Marriage. She critiques the philosophical underpinnings of the institution of marriage in 1700s England, warning women of the dangers of a hasty or ill-considered choice. The Duchess of Mazarin is used as an example of "the dangers of an ill Education and unequal Marriage." Astell argues that education will help women to make better matrimonial choices and meet the challenges of the married state: "She has need of a strong Reason, of a truly Christian and well-temper'd Spirit, of all the Assistance the best Education can give her, and ought to have some good assurance of her own Firmness and Vertue, who ventures on such a Trial."

Astell warns that disparity in intelligence, character, and fortune may lead to misery, and recommends that marriage be based on lasting friendship rather than short-lived attraction. A woman should look for "a good Understanding, a Vertuous Mind, and in all other respects let there be as much equality as may be." Astell expanded on this theme in response to critics in the third edition of Some Reflections upon Marriage.

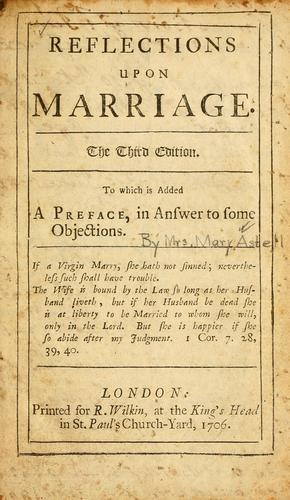
Cover page from 1706 edition of Reflections upon Marriage

She withdrew from public life in 1709 to become head of a charity school for girls in Chelsea, funded by two wealthy philanthropists, Lady Catherine Jones and Lady Elizabeth Hastings. Backed by the Society for the Propagation of Christian Knowledge, Astell designed the school curriculum and it is thought to be the first school in England with an all-women board of governors. When she was 60 years old, in 1726, Astell was invited to live with Lady Catherine Jones, with whom she resided until her death in 1731.

Astell died in London a few months after a mastectomy to remove a cancerous right breast. In her last days, she refused to see any of her acquaintances and stayed in a room with her coffin, thinking only of God; she was buried in the churchyard of Chelsea Church in London.

Astell is remembered for her ability to debate with both men and women, and for her groundbreaking methods of negotiating the position of women in society by engaging in philosophical debate (René Descartes was a particular influence) rather than basing her arguments in historical evidence as had been attempted. Descartes's theory of dualism, a separate mind and body, allowed Astell to promote the idea that women, as well as men, had the ability to reason, and subsequently, they should not be treated so poorly; "If all Men are born Free, why are all Women born Slaves?"

== Books ==
Mary Astell's works were published anonymously. Her two best-known books, A Serious Proposal to the Ladies, for the Advancement of Their True and Greatest Interest (1694) and A Serious Proposal, Part II (1697), outline her plan to establish a new type of institution for women to assist in providing women with both religious and secular education. She suggests extending women's career options beyond mother and nun. She felt that uneducated women were concerned with beauty and vanity, and the lack of education was the root of their inferiority to men, not that they were naturally inferior. Astell wanted all women to have the same opportunity as men to spend eternity in heaven with God, and she believed that for this they needed to be educated and to understand their experiences. The "nunnery" style education she proposed would enable women to live in a protected environment, without the influences of the external patriarchal society.

Her proposal was never adopted because critics said it seemed "too Catholic" for the English. Later her ideas about women were satirised in The Tatler by the writer Jonathan Swift. While the writer Daniel Defoe admired the first part of Astell's proposal, he believed that her recommendations were "impracticable." Patricia Springborg notes that Defoe's own recommendation for an academy for women (as detailed in his An Essay Upon Projects) did not significantly differ from Astell's original proposal. Despite this, she was still an intellectual force among the educated classes of London.

A few years later, Astell published the second part of A Serious Proposal, detailing her own vision of women's education for courtly ladies. She broke away from the contemporary rhetorical style of the period where orators spoke before an audience for learning, and instead she offered a conversational style of teaching "neighbors" the proper way of behaviour. She referred only to the Port-Royal Logic as a source of contemporary influence, although she still relied upon classical rhetorical theories when presenting her original concepts. In her presentation, she offered that rhetoric, as an art, does not require a male education to become a master, and she listed the means by which a woman could acquire the necessary skills from natural logic. This established Astell as a capable female rhetorician.

After reading Norris's Practical Discourses, upon several Divine subjects (1691), in the early 1690s Astell entered into correspondence with John Norris of Bemerton. The letters illuminate Astell's thoughts on God and theology. Norris thought the letters worthy of publication and with Astell's consent, he had them published as Letters Concerning the Love of God (1695). Her name did not appear in the book, but her identity was soon discovered and her rhetorical style was much lauded by contemporaries.

== Philosophy ==
=== Friendship ===
One of Astell's notable contributions to eighteenth-century ideas of a friendship between women rests on the political exigencies of forming alliances. Jacqueline Broad views Astell's bond of friendship as more Aristotelian, where alliances are formed for the sake of virtuous reciprocity. However, Nancy Kendrick does not accept Broad's viewpoint. She feels Astell's "theory of friendship is determinedly anti-Aristotelian". Although Astell embraced the Aristotelian friendship of moral virtue, Kendrick claims that Astell treated "virtuous friends as those who love one another for who they essentially are" and not just for the sake of reciprocity. Contrary to Aristotle, Astell contends that authentic virtuous friendship arose from the Divine Nature of God, thus becoming spiritual friendship. Furthermore, Astell, unlike Aristotle, saw this love in friendship extending toward one's enemies because Divine Love embraces all of mankind.

=== Education for women ===
Astell argued that women possessed the same rational abilities as men which drew on Cartesian philosophy and its distinction between mind and body. She emphasized that differences in physical characteristics did not indicate differences in intellectual capacity. These arguments challenged assumptions about women's inferiority and supported their rights to intellectual education. Furthermore, she thought that the limited educational opportunities for women at the time curtailed their ability to develop their rational faculties, causing them to be perceived as more ignorant. This ignorance translated into a perception of sin, which Astell thought could be countered if women were educated to be more virtuous. Therefore, she advocated for a comprehensive education that would enable women to participate in society, engage in intellectual discourse, and contribute to the public sphere. Astell thought that a proper education was crucial for women to attain social and intellectual independence, allowing them to break free from the constraints imposed by patriarchal society.

Astell believed that women should be educated in a spiritual, women-only environment, away from society. She felt that women should receive an education free of male influence because of how corrupt the world under male dominance was. To accomplish these aims, she suggested the establishment of a monastery-like institution where young women could receive an education and older women could retire. Astell held that this education should be composed of subjects traditionally dominated by men, such as philosophy and theology, along with a strong religious component.

=== Marriage ===
Astell's Some Reflections upon Marriage emphasises the importance of women's education for improving the state of marriage. She is remembered for her harsh but witty indictment of early modern marriage in her Some Reflections Upon Marriage (1700). She explains that if women were better educated, they would choose their partners more wisely and exhibit better behavior. She cites the example of Hortense Mancini, whose separation from her abusive husband led to a questioning of the role of choice by women in marriage. Astell asserts that marriage’s current state is far from its original sanctity as a holy institution established by God, because of widespread corruption and immoral behaviour. She encourages women to fortify their virtue and reason through education and to distance themselves from activities such as gambling and flirting. Although Astell's view of the roles women and men should adopt in marriage is largely conservative, encouraging women to submit to the will of their husbands, she affirms women's intellectual equality to men and warns women to choose husbands they can respect.

Scholars have suggested that Astell's Reflections contain a veiled political subtext challenging the Whig theorists of her time to extend the same authority granted to husbands in the domestic sphere to sovereigns in the state. By questioning the acceptance of submission and obedience to authority in the home, but not in the state, Astell presents an ironic challenge to Whig opponents, implying that Whig theorists should practise passive obedience to their political leaders.

Although Astell generally endorses marriage as "the Institution of Heaven" and a "great Blessing" for wives, she recognises that some women might not be inclined toward marriage. Astell never married, although she may have been engaged to a clergyman at one point in her life, as her eighteenth-century biographer George Ballard suggested. It is suspected that because of her family's financial state, she lacked the dowry expected for a match in the late seventeenth-century England. But because details of her life are scarce, it cannot be confirmed that Astell was ever engaged.

=== Religion and politics ===
Some have questioned how Astell could be both a feminist and a High-Church Tory given her disapproval of John Locke's political views and her opposition to Whig theories of liberty, resistance, and tolerance. At first glance, her support for a political party that fights freedom of conscience and other perceived dangers to the Anglican church seems in opposition with her advocacy for women's freedom of judgment. Scholars have seen that Astell's feminism is not founded on liberal political objectives but rather on intellectual premises, explaining why, at the time, she did not demand complete political equality for women.

Having been exposed in her youth to civil unrest and riots in the streets of Newcastle is probably what helped develop her interest in politics. She had idealised King Charles I and viewed his successors, William and Mary, as "illegitimate" rulers to the throne of England. Her unwavering support of Tory politics and the primacy of Anglicanism has caused her writings to be reevaluated in that context.

According to Astell's Anglican political theology, all subjects are required to adhere to the notion of passive obedience, which mandates that they must willingly surrender to political authority. When they are unable to do so openly, they must submit to the punishment for it. Even if the crown had dictatorial authority, Astell argued that political subjects were never entitled to oppose the monarch.

Locke criticised Astell's views on natural law and the right of resistance in his First Treatise, published in 1690. Astell maintains that while Locke considers self-preservation to be a fundamental right, it only involves preserving the immortal soul. Therefore, humans are only entitled to act in ways that will ensure the safety of their souls from judgment, in accordance with natural law.

== List of works ==
- A Serious Proposal to the Ladies for the Advancement of their True and Greatest Interest. By a Lover of Her Sex. 1694, 1695, 1696 1697 (two printings), 1701, 1703
- Some Reflections Upon Marriage, Occasioned by the Duke and Dutchess of Mazarine's Case; Which is Also Considered. London: Printed for John Nutt, near Stationers-Hall, 1700 1700, Also: 1703, 1706, 1730 (two editions)
- A Fair Way with Dissenters and their Patrons. Not writ by Mr. L – - – - – y, or any other Furious Jacobite, whether Clergyman or Layman; but by a very Moderate Person and Dutiful Subject to the Queen. 1704
- An Impartial Enquiry into the Causes of Rebellion and Civil War in this Kingdom: In an examination of Dr. Kennett’s sermon, 31 Jan. 1703/4. And Vindication of the Royal Martyr. 1704
- The Character of the Wisest Men. Re-printed and published by the Author’s Friends. 1704
- Moderation Truly Stated: or, a review of a late pamphlet, entitul’d Moderation a virtue, or the occasional conformist justify’d from the imputation of hypocricy. Wherein this justification is further consider’d, …. 1704
- Letters concerning the love of God, between the author of the proposal to the ladies and Mr. John Norris: Wherein his late Discourse, shewing, That it ought to be intire and exclusive of all other Loves, is further Cleared and Justified. Published by J. Noris, M. A. Rector of Bemerton near Sarum. The second edition, corrected by the authors, with some few things added. 1705, 1730
- Reflections upon marriage. The third edition. To which is added a preface, in answer to some objections. 1706
- The Christian religion, as profess’d by a daughter of the Church of England. 1705, 1717, 1730
- Bart’lemy Fair: or an enquiry after with: in which due respect is had to a letter concerning enthusiasm, to my Lord ***. By Mr. Wotton. 1709
- An enquiry after wit: wherein the trifling arguing and impious raillery of the late Earl of Shaftesbury, in his Letter concerning enthusiasm, and other profane writers, are fully answer’d and justly exposed. 1722
- (Attributed) An essay in defence of the female sex. : In which are inserted the characters of a pedant, a squire, a beau, a vertuoso, a poetaster, a city-critick, &c. in a letter to a lady. 1696 (two editions), 1697
- (Attributed) Six familiar essays upon marriage, death, crosses in love, sickness and friendship. 1696

== Legacy ==
Astell's ideas about women in education laid the foundation for later feminist movements, as they challenged social norms and paved the way for improved educational opportunities for women. Her work continues to inspire contemporary debates on gender equality and the importance of education in women's empowerment. Mary Astell's groundbreaking reflections on women's education continue to be a testament to her enduring legacy as a feminist philosopher and advocate for women's rights.

Astell had a significant personal library that was an unusual example of a late seventeenth- and early eighteenth-century book collection owned by a woman who was a published author. Her books bear the inscription of her name on the title page and her many annotations in her books. In 2021 a collection of 47 of Astell's books and pamphlets, many of which have her annotations, were identified in the Old Library at Magdalene College, Cambridge by Catherine Sutherland, the deputy librarian. These marginalia reveal, for the first time, the degree to which she was involved with the natural philosophy literature and discourse of her time. Other holdings are at the British Library and the Northamptonshire Record Office.

The Mary Astell Academy (formerly Linhope PRU) in Linhope Road, Newcastle upon Tyne, is named after her. In Germany, there is a street dedicated to her, Mary-Astell-Straße, in Bremen.

== Bibliography ==
- Almeroth-Williams, Tom (8 March 2021). "Ahead of her time: Magdalene College discovers a treasure trove of women's intellectual history". University of Cambridge.
- Astell, Mary. The Christian Religion, as Professed by a Daughter of the Church of England. Ed. Jacqueline Broad. Toronto: CRRS and Iter, 2013. ISBN 978-0-7727-2142-6.
- Astell, Mary. A Serious Proposal to the Ladies. Ed. Patricia Springborg. Peterborough: Broadview Press, 2002. ISBN 1-55111-306-6.
- Broad, Jacqueline. The Philosophy of Mary Astell: An Early Modern Theory of Virtue. Oxford: Oxford University Press, 2015. ISBN 9780198716815.
- Donawerth, Jane (2002). Rhetorical Theory by Women Before 1900: An Anthology. Rowman & Littlefield. ISBN 978-0742517165.
- Hill, Bridget. The First English Feminist: "Reflections Upon Marriage" and Other Writings by Mary Astell. Aldershot: Gower Publishing, 1986.
- Hill, Bridget. "A Refuge from Men: The Idea of a Protestant Nunnery". Past and Present 117 (1987): 107–30.
- James, Regina. "Mary, Mary, Quite Contrary, Or, Mary Astell and Mary Wollstonecraft Compared". Studies in Eighteenth Century Culture 5 (1976): 121–39.
- Perry, Ruth. The Celebrated Mary Astell: An Early English Feminist. Chicago: University of Chicago Press, 1986. ISBN 0-226-66093-1.
- Scott, Beatrice (1983). "Lady Elizabeth Hastings". The Yorkshire Archaeological Journal. 55.
- Smith, Florence M. Mary Astell. New York: Columbia University Press, 1916.
- Springborg, Patricia. Mary Astell (1666–1731), Political Writings. Cambridge: Cambridge University Press, 1996.
- Springborg, Patricia. "Mary Astell and John Locke," in Steven Zwicker (ed.), The Cambridge Companion to English Literature, 1650 to 1750. Cambridge: Cambridge University Press, 1998.
- Springborg, Patricia, Mary Astell: Theorist of Freedom from Domination (Cambridge, Cambridge University Press, 2005).
- Stone Stanton, Kamille. "'Affliction, the Sincerest Friend': Mary Astell’s Philosophy of Women’s Superiority through Martyrdom" Prose Studies: History, Theory, Criticism. ISSN 0144-0357 Special Issue: The Long Restoration. Vol. 29.1. Spring, 2007, pp. 104–114.
- "‘Capable of Being Kings’: The Influence of the Cult of King Charles I on the Early Modern Women's Literary Canon" New Perspectives on the Eighteenth Century. ISSN 1544-9009 Vol 5.1. Spring 2008, pp. 20–29.
- Sutherland, Christine. The Eloquence of Mary Astell. University of Calgary Press, 2005.
- Mary Astell: Reason, Gender, Faith. Edited by William Kolbrener and Michal Michelson. Aldershot, 2007, 230 pp.
