= Robert Anderson (editor and biographer) =

Scottish physician, author and critic

Robert Anderson (7 January 1750 – 20 February 1830) was a Scottish author and critic.

Son of David Anderson, W.S., he was born at Carnwath, Lanarkshire. He studied first divinity and then medicine at the University of Edinburgh, and subsequently, after some experience as a surgeon, took his M.D. at the University of St Andrews in 1778. He began to practise as a physician at Alnwick in Northumberland, but he became financially independent by his marriage with the daughter of John Gray, and abandoned his profession for a literary life in Edinburgh.

For several years his attention was occupied with his edition of The Works of the British Poets, with Prefaces Biographical and Critical (14 vols. 8vo, Edin., 1792–1807). His other publications were:

- The Miscellaneous Works of Tobias Smollett, M.D., with Memoirs of his Life and Writings (Edin., 1796)
- Life of Samuel Johnson, LL.D., with Critical Observations on his Works (Edin., 1815)
- The Works of John Moore, M.D., with Memoirs of his Life and Writings (Edin., 7 vols., 1820)
- The Grave and other Poems, by Robert Blair; to which are prefixed some Account of his Life and Observations on his Writings (Edin., 1826).

Anderson was elected a member of the American Antiquarian Society in 1816.

== Freemasonry ==
He was a Scottish Freemason, having been initiated in The Lodge of Holyrood House (St Luke's), No. 44, in 1781.
