= Old English Orosius =

Old English translation of Orosius's Historiae adversum paganos

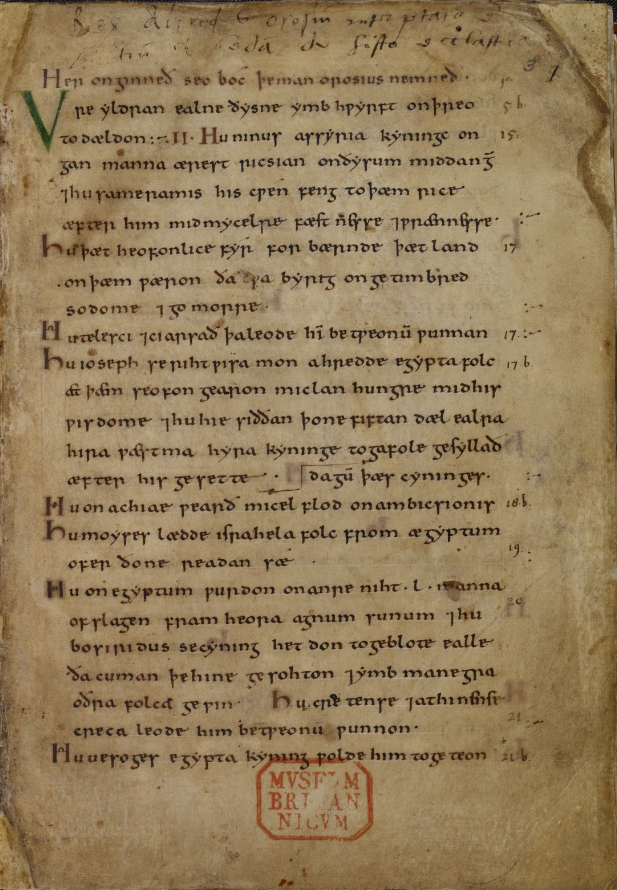
A page of the manuscript of Orosius in Old English.

Old English Orosius is the name usually given by scholars to an adaptation into Old English of the Latin Historiae adversus paganos by Paulus Orosius (fl. c. 400). Malcolm Godden's 2016 edition instead calls the text the Old English History of the World, emphasising the degree to which the Old English text selects, adapts, and abets Orosius's. Produced around the year 900 in the West-Saxon dialect, the Old English version was produced by an anonymous writer, possibly encouraged or inspired by King Alfred the Great. The translator actively transformed Orosius's narrative, cutting extraneous detail, adding explanations and dramatic speeches, and supplying a long section on the geography of the North European world.

The work is particularly noted in modern scholarship for including an account of the travels of a Norwegian traveller whom it calls Ohthere, which provides unique information about northern Europe around the late ninth century. It also describes the travels of Wulfstan of Hedeby.

== Editions and translations ==
- Orosius, Old English History of the World: An Anglo-Saxon Rewriting of Orosius, ed. and trans. Malcolm Godden, Dumbarton Oaks Medieval Library, 44 (Cambridge, MA: Harvard University Press, 2016), ISBN 978-0674971066.
- The Old English Orosius, ed. by Janet Bately, Early English Text Society (London: Oxford University Press, 1980).
- Orosius (c. 417), Alfred the Great; Barrington, Daines (eds.), The Anglo-Saxon Version, from the Historian Orosius, London: Printed by W. Bowyer and J. Nichols and sold by S. Baker (published 1773)
- Facsimile of the earliest surviving manuscript, London, British Library, Add MS 47967.
