= Elizabeth Elstob =

English linguist and feminist (1683–1756)

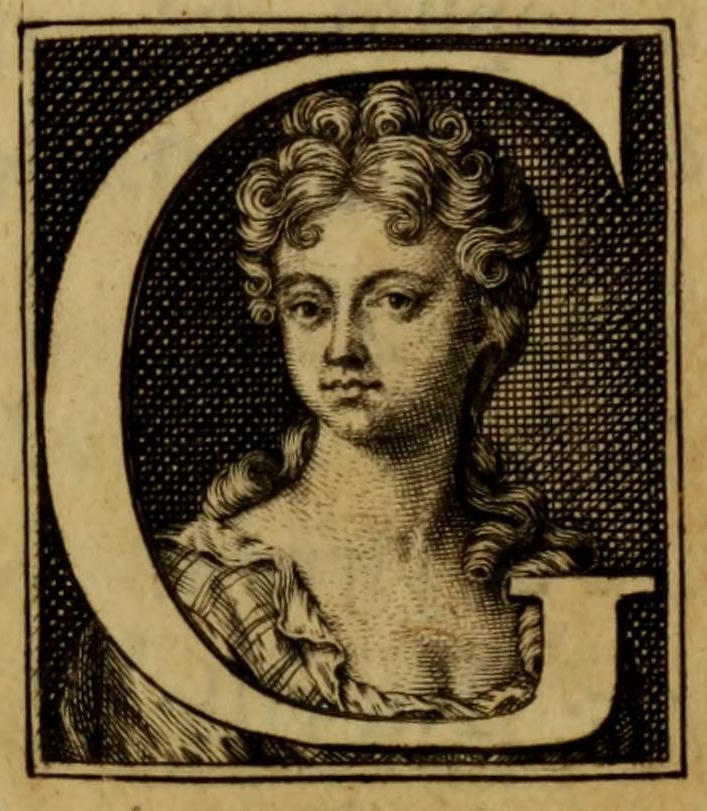
- Initial with Elizabeth Elstob's portrait from her English-Saxon Homily on the Birth-Day of St. Gregory (1709)
- Born: 29 September 1683; Newcastle upon Tyne, England
- Died: 30 May 1756 (aged 72); Bulstrode Park, Buckinghamshire, England
- Occupations: Anglo-Saxonist, Linguist, Historian, Author, Translator, Governess
- Known for: First scholar to publish Old English grammar in modern English

Academic work
- Notable works: Rudiments of Grammar for the English-Saxon Tongue (1715), English-Saxon Homily on the Nativity of St Gregory (1709), Translation of Madeleine de Scudéry's Essay upon Glory (1708)

Elizabeth Elstob (29 September 1683 – 30 May 1756), the "Saxon Nymph", was a pioneering scholar of Anglo-Saxon. She was the first person to publish a grammar of Old English written in modern English.

== Life ==
Elstob was born and brought up in the Quayside area of Newcastle upon Tyne, and, like Mary Astell of Newcastle, is nowadays regarded as one of the first English feminists. She was the daughter of Ralph, a merchant, and his wife Jane Elstob (née Hall). Elizabeth's father died when she was five, and her mother died three years later. She was the youngest of eight children. Before her mother died, she encouraged Elizabeth to become a scholar, for she was an admirer of learning especially for women. By the age of eight, Elizabeth had already mastered Latin grammar.

Elizabeth became proficient in eight languages, and was a pioneer in Anglo-Saxon studies, an unprecedented achievement for a woman in the period. Following the deaths of both of her parents, Elstob was an orphan, and was raised by her aunt and uncle Charles Elstob, a prebendary in Canterbury. He disdained female education, believing that "one tongue is enough for a woman", but her aunt enabled her to learn French. Doris Mary Stenton attributes the majority of Elstob's education to her brother William Elstob (1673–1715), who was sent to Eton and Cambridge and entered the Church. Like his sister, he was a scholar and edited Roger Ascham's Letters in 1703. Elizabeth lived with him at Oxford from 1696, and in London from 1702. As a teenager he introduced her to a small but enthusiastic circle of scholars who worked on Anglo-Saxon history and culture. He described Elizabeth as 'the delightful and tireless companion of my studies'.

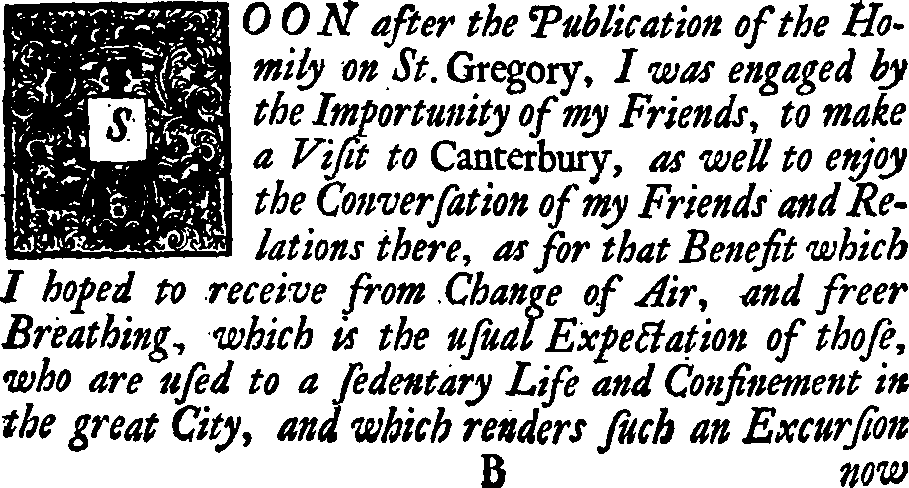
A fleuron (ornamental typography) from Elstob's Rudiments of Grammar

As part of her scholarly interest in early English, Elstob collaborated and corresponded with scholars like Humfrey Wanley and George Hickes. She was introduced to Hickes by her brother William. She worked with Wanley to design the typeface for her 1715 Rudiments of Grammar for the English-Saxon Tongue, and was a skilled scribe and facsimilist in her own right. Her facsimile of the Textus Roffensis is housed at the British Library under the shelfmark Harley MS 1866. Elstob was the first editor of the Old-English Orosius, a translation often attributed to Alfred the Great, of Paulus Orosius's Historiae adversus paganos (History against the Pagans). Orosius's History was written around 417 CE, probably in north Africa, at the request of Augustine of Hippo.

In London, Elstob translated Madeleine de Scudéry's Essay upon Glory in 1708, and an English-Saxon Homily on the Nativity of St Gregory in 1709 Both works are dedicated to Queen Anne, who is praised in feminist prefaces.

From 1702 Elstob was part of the circle of female intellectuals around Mary Astell, who helped to find subscribers for her Rudiments of Grammar for the English-Saxon Tongue (1715), the first such work written in English. The preface, "An Apology for the Study of Northern Antiquities", took issue with the formidable Jonathan Swift, and seems to have caused him to amend his views.

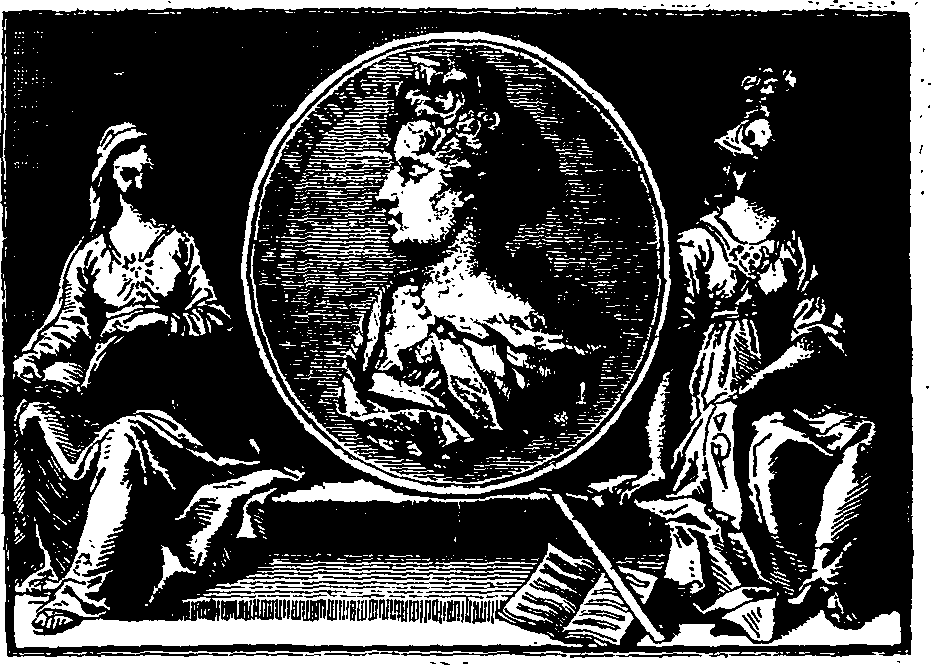
Fleuron (ornamental typography) from Elstob's The Rudiments of Grammar for the English-Saxon Tongue

After her brother's death in 1715, she was left without a home and plagued by debts he had incurred in financing their expensive publications. She tried to start a girls' school in Chelsea, but despite obtaining so many pupils that she had "scarcely time to eat", they only paid a groat (4d.) a week, and the school failed within six months. In 1718 she fled London and her creditors, leaving behind her books and a partial manuscript of Ælfric’s Catholic Homilies which she had translated. This was never published, and is now preserved at the British Library. She entrusted her papers to a friend who went to the West Indies, and the papers were lost.

Elstob ended up in Evesham in rural Worcestershire. She lived there for many years dependent on her friends, running a small dame school under the assumed name of Frances Smith. Her whereabouts were apparently unknown to anyone in the scholarly community until 1735.

In the autumn of 1738 Elstob was introduced to the wealthy Margaret Bentinck, Duchess of Portland, and was made governess to her children, remaining in her service until her death, at Bulstrode Park, Buckinghamshire, on 30 May 1756. In her last years she lived "surrounded by the congenial elements of dirt and her books". She wrote in a letter that "this is not an Age to hope for any encouragement to Learning of any kind".

She was buried in the churchyard of St Margaret's, Westminster on 3 June 1756.
