= List of presidents of Queens' College, Cambridge =

This is a list of presidents of Queens' College, Cambridge. While the head of most colleges are called masters, the head of Queens' College, Cambridge, has been called the president since 1448. Below is the list of presidents that have served the college:

| Name | Portrait | Dates | Notes |
|---|---|---|---|
| Andrew Dokett | | 1448–1484 | English churchman and academic |
| Thomas Wilkynson | | 1484–1505 | Vicar, Canon of Ripon |
| John Cardinal Fisher | | 1505–1508 | Catholic Bishop of Rochester; executed by Henry VIII for refusing to accept him as head of the Church of England in 1535, canonised in 1935. Namesake of the Fisher Building. |
| Robert Bekensaw | | 1508–1519 | English churchman and academic |
| John Jenyn | | 1519–1525 | Cleric |
| Thomas Forman | | 1525–1527 | Rector of All Hallows, London. Early Reformer. |
| William Frankleyn | | 1527–1529 | English churchman, dean of Windsor |
| Simon Heynes | | 1529–1537 | Theologian. Early reformer. |
| William May | | 1537–1553, 1559–1560 | Theologian and dean of St Paul's Cathedral; his report saved the Cambridge colleges from dissolution under Henry VIII |
| William Glyn | | 1553–1557 | Also Bishop of Bangor |
| Thomas Pecocke | | 1557–1559 | Theologian |
| John Stokes | | 1560–1568 | Also Archdeacon of York |
| William Chaderton | | 1568–1579 | Later Bishop of Chester and Bishop of Lincoln |
| Humphrey Tyndall | | 1579–1614 | Theologian, Dean of Ely and Archdeacon of Stafford |
| John Davenant | | 1614–1622 | Later Bishop of Salisbury |
| John Mansell | | 1622–1631 | Churchman, theologian, philosopher |
| Edward Martin | | 1631–1644, 1660–1662 | Sent the college silver to King Charles I; imprisoned in the Tower of London by Oliver Cromwell; restored to presidency under Charles II |
| Herbert Palmer | | 1644–1647 | Puritan and member of the Westminster Assembly; installed as president by Cromwell |
| Thomas Horton | | 1647–1660 | Theologian; removed by the restoration of the monarchy |
| Anthony Sparrow | | 1662–1667 | Later Bishop of Exeter and Bishop of Norwich |
| William Wells | | 1667–1675 | Archdeacon of Colchester |
| Henry James | | 1675–1717 | Theologian, Regius Professor of Divinity. |
| John Davies | | 1717–1732 | Clergyman and classicist. |
| William Sedgwick | | 1732–1760 | Clergyman and academic. |
| Robert Plumptre | | 1760–1788 | Clergyman and academic. |
| Isaac Milner | | 1788–1820 | Clergyman, mathematician, inventor, abolitionist. Lucasian Professor of Mathematics and Dean of Carlisle. |
| Henry Godfrey | | 1820–1832 | Clergyman and academic. |
| Joshua King | | 1832–1857 | Mathematician, Lucasian Professor of Mathematics. |
| George Phillips | | 1857–1892 | Clergyman, mathematician, scholar of Semitic languages. |
| William Magan Campion | | 1892–1896 | Clergyman and mathematician. |
| Herbert Edward Ryle | | 1896–1901 | Theologian, Hulsean Professor of Divinity. Later Bishop of Exeter, Bishop of Winchester and Dean of Westminster |
| Frederic Chase | | 1901–1906 | Theologian, Norrisian Professor of Divinity. Later Bishop of Ely. |
| Thomas Cecil Fitzpatrick | | 1906–1931 | Clergyman and physicist. Namesake of Fitzpatrick Hall in Cripps Court. |
| John Archibald Venn | | 1931–1958 | Economist and government advisor. Son of the logician John Venn. |
| Arthur Armitage | | 1958–1970 | Barrister and government advisor. Namesake of the Armitage Room above Fitzpatrick Hall. |
| Sir Derek Bowett | | 1970–1982 | International lawyer, Whewell Professor of International Law. |
| Lord Oxburgh | | 1982–1988 | Geologist and geophysicist |
| Sir John Polkinghorne | | 1988–1996 | KBE; FRS; physicist and theologian; extensive writer on science-faith relations; Templeton Prize 2002; member of General Synod |
| Lord Eatwell | | 1997–2020 | Economist, previously chief economic adviser to Neil Kinnock and chairman of the British Library; Opposition Spokesman for the Treasury in the House of Lords. |
| Mohamed A. El-Erian | | 2020–2025 | Economist, previously Chief Executive Officer at PIMCO |
| Dame Menna Rawlings | | 2025– | Diplomat |
