= Plumptre =

Plumptre is a surname. Notable people with the surname include:

- Adelaide Plumptre (1874–1948), Canadian activist, diplomat, and politician in Toronto
- Annabella Plumptre (1769–1838), English writer and translator
- Anne Plumptre (1760–1818), English writer and translator
- Ashleigh Plumptre (born 1998), Nigerian football player
- Edward Hayes Plumptre (1821–1891), English divine and scholar
- Frederick Charles Plumptre (1796–1870), Master of University College, Oxford
- Henry Plumptre Gipps (1813–1859), English lawyer and politician
- James Plumptre (1771–1832) English clergyman and dramatist
- John Pemberton Plumptre (1791–1864), British politician
