= William May (theologian) =

English cleric and academic (died 1560)

William May (died 1560), also known as William Meye, was dean of St Paul's. He was nominated Archbishop of York in 1560, but died before he could take office.

William May was the brother of John May, bishop of Carlisle. He was educated at Cambridge, where he was a fellow of Trinity Hall, and in 1537, president of Queens' College. May heartily supported the Reformation, signed the Ten Articles in 1536, and helped in the production of The Institution of a Christian Man. He had close connection with the diocese of Ely, being successively chancellor, vicar-general and prebendary. In 1545 he was made a prebendary of St Paul's Cathedral, and, in the following year, dean of St Paul's.

His favorable report on the Cambridge colleges saved them from dissolution. He was dispossessed during the reign of Queen Mary, but restored to the deanery on Elizabeth's accession. He died on the day he was elected Archbishop of York.

Academic offices
Preceded by Simon Heynes	President of Queens' College, Cambridge; 1537–1553	Succeeded by William Glynn
Preceded by Thomas Pecocke	President of Queens' College, Cambridge; 1559–1560	Succeeded by John Stokes
