= Walter Charleton =

English writer

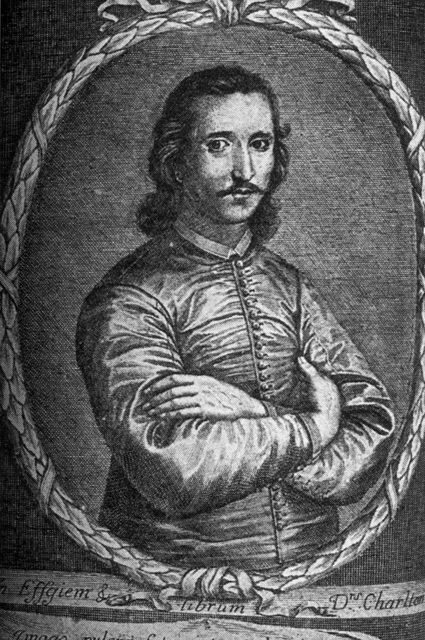
Walter Charleton

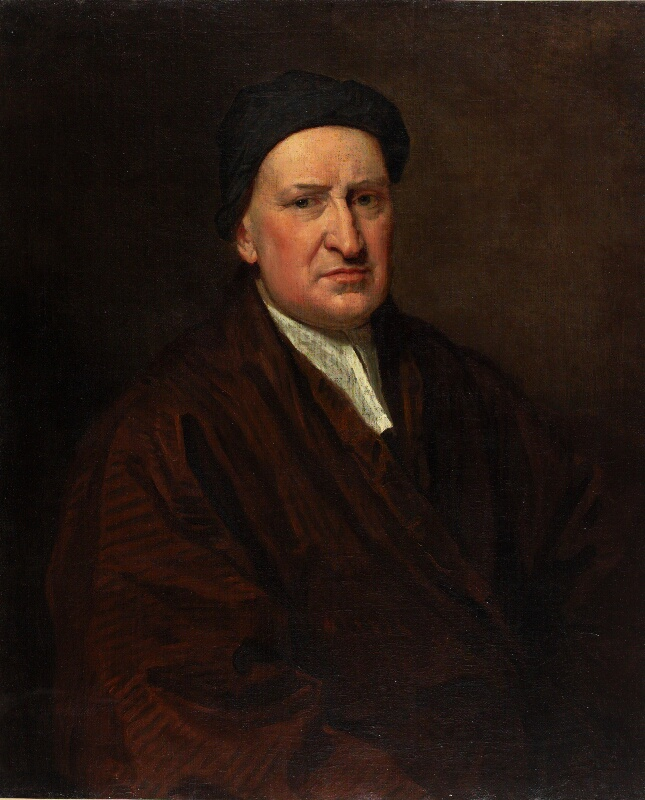
Walter Charleton

Walter Charleton (2 February 1619 – 24 April 1707) was a natural philosopher and English writer.

According to Jon Parkin, he was "the main conduit for the transmission of Epicurean ideas to England".

== Life ==
He was the son of the rector of Shepton Mallet in Somerset, where he was born 2 February 1619. He received his early education from his father, and when sixteen entered Magdalen Hall, Oxford, under the tuition of John Wilkins. At the early age of 22 (1641) he received the degree of M.D. and in the same year was appointed physician to Charles I, who was then at Oxford. In 1650 Charleton settled in London, and was on 8 April admitted a candidate of the College of Physicians. A royalist, he was appointed physician to the exiled king Charles II but remained in London writing, in Russell Street, Covent Garden.

He was continued in his office of physician at the Restoration, and was one of the first elected fellows of the Royal Society in 1663; on 23 January 1676 he was admitted a fellow of the Royal College of Physicians. He gave the first lectures delivered in the Cutlerian Theatre in Warwick Lane, in 1680 delivered the Harveian oration, and was president in 1689 and 1691. After his last year of presidency at the College of Physicians, Charleton left London and a dwindling medical practice. He retired to Nantwich; but returned to London, and was senior censor in the College of Physicians from 1698 to 1706, and delivered Harveian orations in 1680, 1702 and 1706, when he was also appointed Harveian librarian. He died 24 April 1707.

He had in early life read much in Van Helmont, and spent time in reading and composition, rather than with patients. Thomas Hobbes, Lord Dorchester, Sir Francis Prujean and George Ent were his friends.

== Work ==
He was a copious writer also on theology, natural history, and antiquities, and published Chorea Gigantum (1663) to prove that Stonehenge was built by the Danes. Charleton claimed it was used by them as a place of assembly, and of the inauguration of kings. The only argument is that similar stone works exist in Denmark, a fact supplied to Charleton by the Danish antiquary, Wormius, with whom he had corresponded on the book of Inigo Jones in which Stonehenge is said to be a Roman temple. The Chorea Gigantum had a poem by John Dryden written in its praise, the Epistle to Dr. Charleton, prefixed to the presentation copy given to the king.

He was one of the "character" writers, and in this kind of literature wrote an essay A Brief Discourse concerning the Different Wits of Men (1675).

== Publications ==
- Deliramenta Catarrhi (1650)
- The Darknes of Atheism Dispelled by the Light of Nature: a physico-theologicall treatise (1652)
- Physiologia Epicuro-Gassendo-Charletoniana, or a Fabrick of Science Natural, upon the Hypothesis of Atoms (1654; largely based on Pierre Gassendi's Animadversiones, 1649)
- Epicurus's Morals (1656)
- The immortality of the human soul demonstrated by the light of nature, London 1657.
- Dissertatio epistolica de ortu animae humanae, Lugd[uni] Batav[orum] 1658.
- Oeconomia Animalis (1659)
- Natural history of nutrition, life, and voluntary motion, London: Henry Herringman 1659.
- The Ephesian and Cimmerian Matrons, 1659.
- Chorea Gigantum (1663)
- Natural History of the Passions (1674; previously believed to be based on Jean-François Senault's De l'usage des passions, 1641)
- Two Discourses: 1. Concerning the Different Wits of Men, 2. Of the Mysterie of Vintners, London: William Whitwood 1669.
- Enquiries into human nature, London 1680.
- The Harmony of Natural and Divine Laws (1682)
- Three anatomic lectures, London: Walter Kettilby 1683.
