= Josh King =

Josh or Joshua King may refer to:

- Josh King (basketball) (born 1985), American basketball coach
- Josh King (rugby league) (born 1995), Australian rugby league footballer
- Joshua King (mathematician) (1798–1857), University of Cambridge professor
- Joshua King (footballer, born 1992), Norwegian footballer
- Joshua King (footballer, born 2007), English footballer
