= Robert Plumptre =

British priest and academic

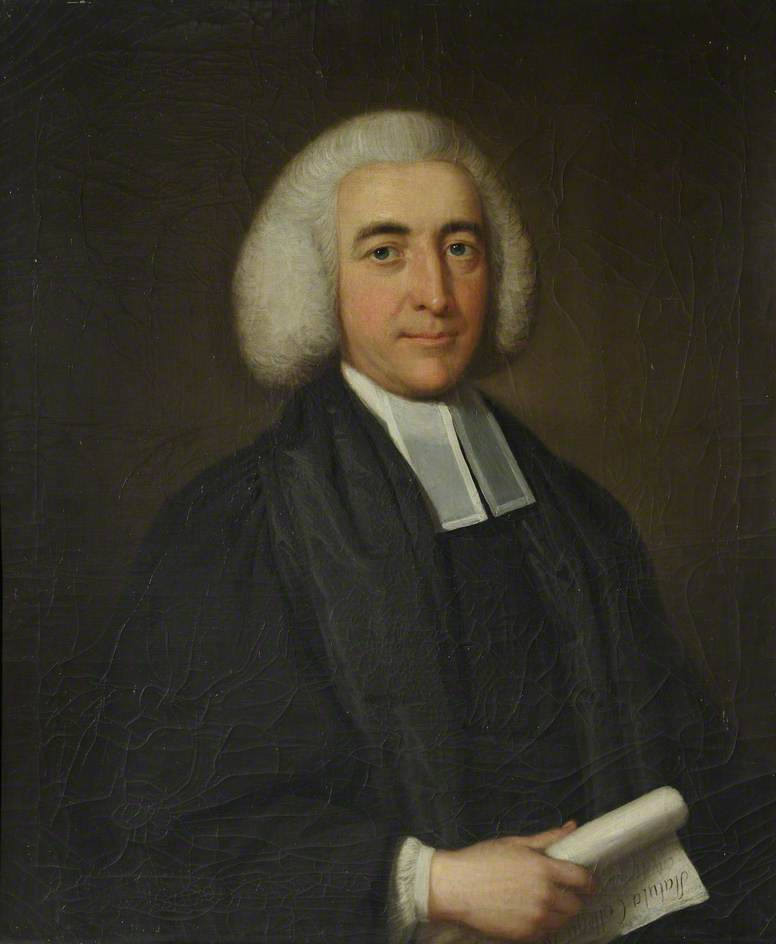
- Born: 1723; Nottinghamshire
- Died: 1788 (aged 64–65); Norwich
- Education: Queens' College
- Occupations: Academic, Priest
- Years active: 1744-1788
- Title: President of Queens' College
- Predecessor: William Sedgwick
- Successor: Isaac Milner
- Children: Annabella Plumptre; Anne Plumptre; James Plumptre

Robert Plumptre (1723–1788) was an English churchman and academic, who served as President of Queens' College, Cambridge from 1760 until his death in 1788.

== Life ==
He was the youngest of ten children of John Plumptre of Nottinghamshire and the grandson of Henry Plumptre. He was educated by Dr. Henry Newcome at Newcome's School in Hackney, and matriculated as a pensioner of Queens' College, Cambridge, on 11 July 1741. He proceeded to earn a B.A. (1744), M.A. (1748), and a D.D. (1761) from Queens.

On 21 March 1745, Plumptre was elected fellow of his college. In 1752 he was instituted to the rectory of Wimpole, Cambridgeshire, on the presentation of Philip Yorke, 1st Earl of Hardwicke; at the same time he held the vicarage of Whaddon. In 1756, Lord Hardwicke made him prebendary of Norwich Cathedral. He was elected president of Queens' College in 1760, and in 1769 he was given the senior professorship, Professor of Casuistry. He held these offices, together with his preferments, till his death. He was vice-chancellor from 1760-1761 and from 1777-1778.

Plumptre was interested in the history of his college, and he left some manuscript collections for historical records. He supported the movement inaugurated by John Jebb in favour of annual examinations. He was a member of the syndicate appointed on 17 February 1774 to devise a scheme for carrying them out, which was rejected on 19 April of the same year. He is also stated to have favoured granting relief to the clergy, who petitioned against subscription to the Thirty-nine Articles in 1772. He published a pamphlet called Hints Respecting some of the University Officers in 1782, of which a second edition appeared in 1802. His Latin poetry appears among the congratulatory verses published by the university in 1761 for the 1762 marriage of George III, on the birth of a Prince of Wales, and in 1763 on the restoration of peace. Plumptre died at Norwich on 29 October 1788. There is a tablet in his memory on the south side of the presbytery.

== Family ==
In September 1756, he married Anne, the second daughter of his former schoolmaster, Dr. Henry Newcome. He had ten children with her, including the author Anne Plumptre and dramatist James Plumptre. His daughter Annabella (or Bell) wrote the book Domestic Management; or, the Healthful Cookery-book: to which is prefixed, a treatise on diet (London: B. & R. Crosby, 1810), published several novels, and translated A. W. Iffland's play Die Jäger and other German works from German to English. (The Foresters. London: Vernor & Hood, 1799)

== Notes ==
Academic offices
Preceded by William Sedgwick	President of Queens' College, Cambridge; 1760–1788	Succeeded by Isaac Milner
