= Birkenshaw =

Birkenshaw may refer to:

== Places ==
- Birkenshaw, North Lanarkshire – near Uddingston
- Birkenshaw, West Yorkshire
  - Birkenshaw and Tong railway station
  - BBG Academy (formerly Birkenshaw Middle School)

== People ==
- Jack Birkenshaw (born 1940), English cricketer, umpire, coach and commentator
- Robert Birkenshaw (died 1526), English priest, Canon of Winchester

== See also ==
- John Birkinshaw
