= William Campion (mathematician) =

William Magan Campion
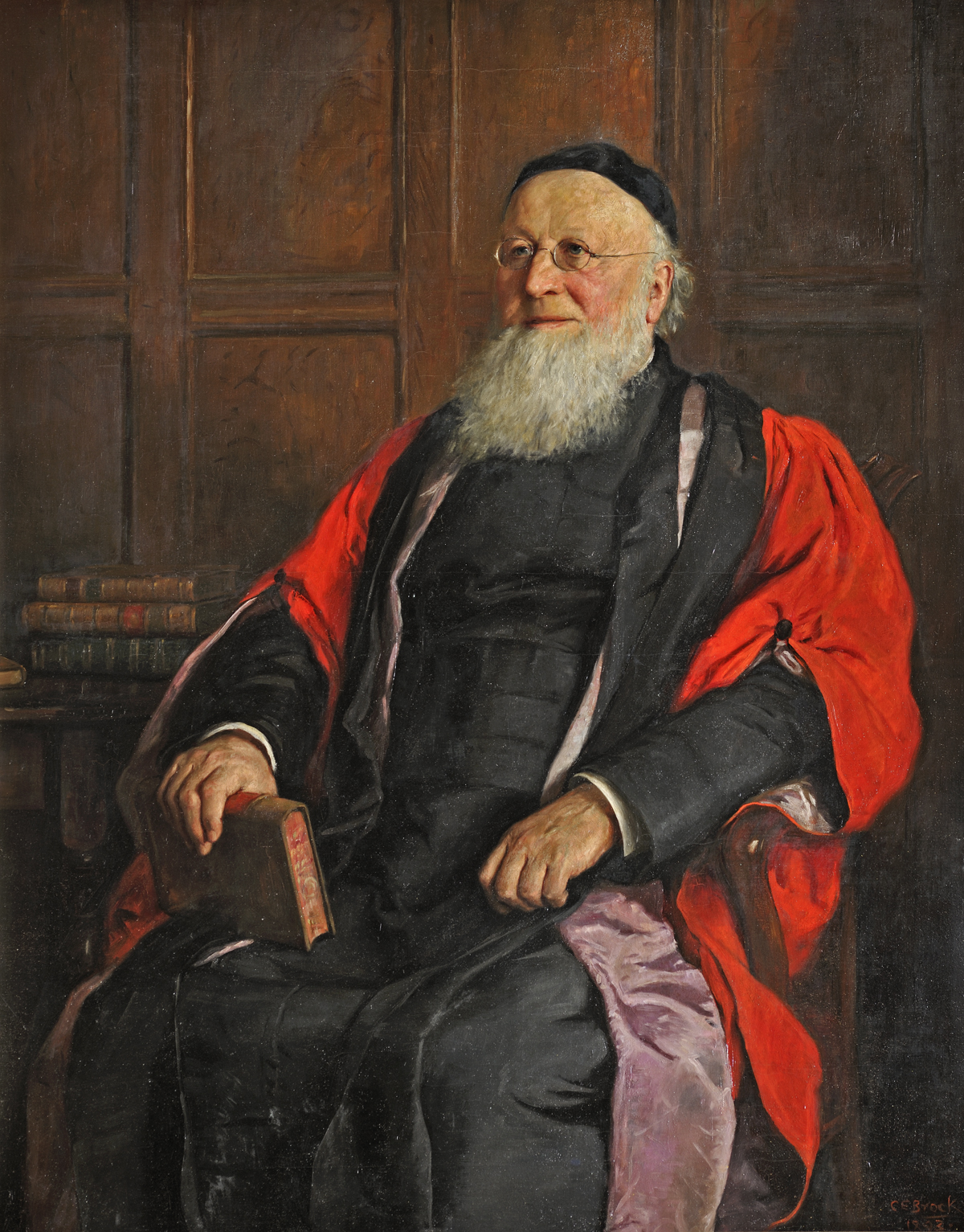
- Portrait of Campion by C. E. Brock, 1893
- Born: 28 October 1820; Ireland
- Died: 20 October 1896 (aged 75); Queens' College, Cambridge, England
- Education: Queens' College, Cambridge
- Occupation: Mathematician

William Magan Campion (1820–1896) was a lecturer in Mathematics and the President of Queens' College, Cambridge, from 1892 until his death.

== Life ==
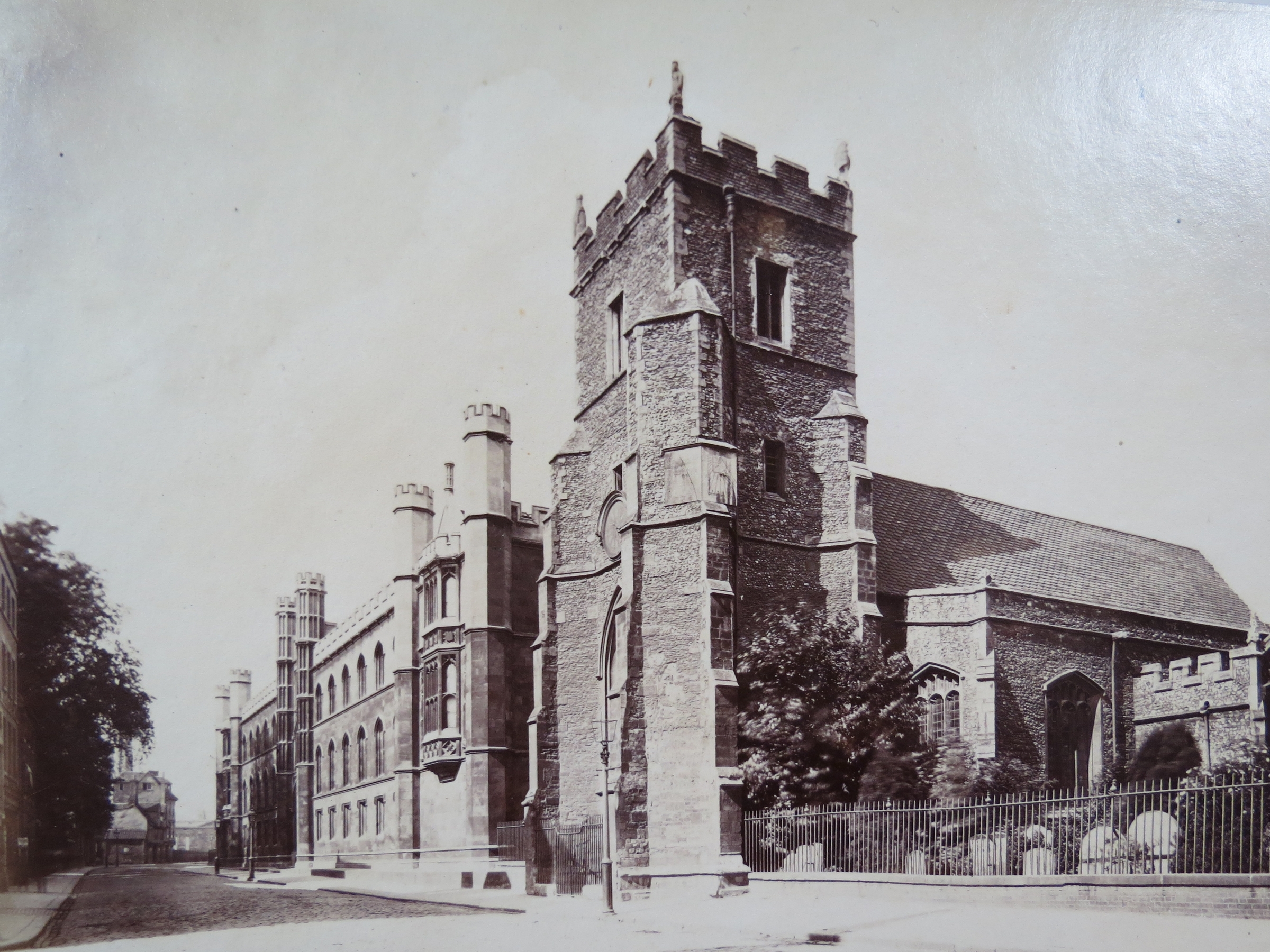
St Botolph's Church, Cambridge, c. 1870

Campion was born in Ireland on 28 October 1820, and was the second son of William Campion of Maryborough, County Laois. He was admitted as pensioner to Queens' College, Cambridge, in 1845 to read mathematics; he was 4th Wrangler. He was elected a Fellow of Queens' in 1850. Campion was considered too young for the presidency of the College in 1857 on the death of Joshua King, but was elected president in 1892 after the death of George Phillips when already old and in poor health.

Campion was a member of the first Council of the Senate, and its secretary in 1865. He was rector of the St Botolph's Church, Cambridge, 1862-1892, and a rural dean, 1870-1892, and honorary canon of Ely Cathedral, 1879-1896.

In conjunction with W. J. Beaumont, he wrote a learned yet popular exposition of the Book of Common Prayer, entitled The Prayer-Book Interleaved.

He died in the President's Lodge at Queens' College on 20 October 1896 and is buried in the Mill Road Cemetery, Cambridge.

Academic offices
Preceded by George Phillips	President of Queens' College, Cambridge; 1892–1896	Succeeded by Herbert Edward Ryle
