= Henry Plumptre =

English physician (died 1746)

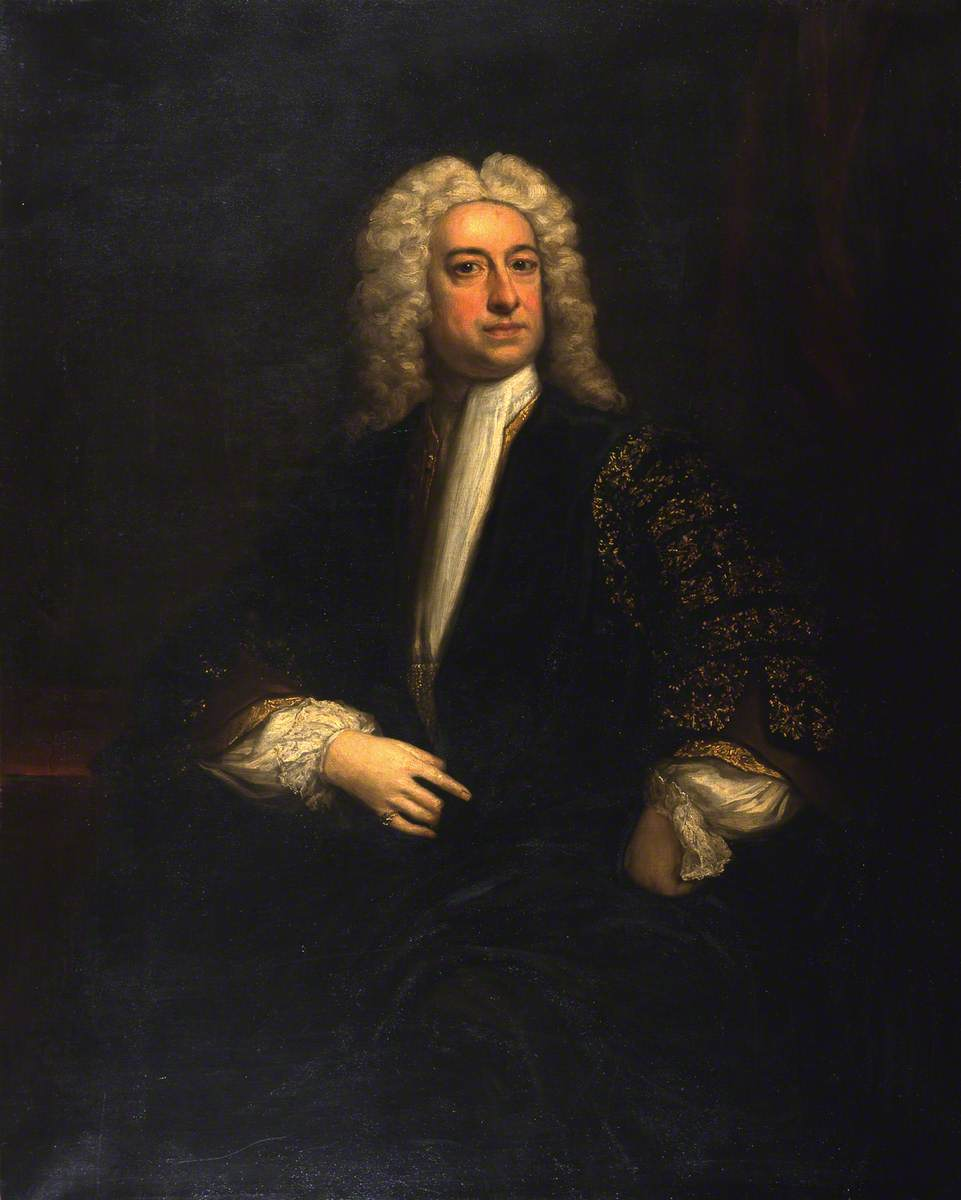
- Plumptre by Jonathan Richardson
- Born: Nottingham
- Died: 26 November 1746
- Occupation: Physician

Henry Plumptre (died 26 November 1746) was an English physician.

== Biography ==
Plumptre was the second son of Henry Plumptre of Nottingham, by his second wife, Joyce (d. 1708), daughter of Henry Sacheverell of Barton, and widow of John Milward of Snitterton, Derbyshire. His grandfather, Huntingdon Plumptre, graduated with a B.A. from Trinity Hall, Cambridge, 1622, M.A. 1626, and M.D. 1631, was ‘accounted the best physician at Nottingham,’ and was the author of a rare work, ‘Epigrammaton Opusculum duobus Libellis distinctum,’ London, 1629, 12mo, which he dedicated to Sir John Byron; one copy was presented to Francis Prujean, and another to the library of St. John's College, Cambridge. He also translated Homer's ‘Batrachomyomachia’ into Latin verse (Wood, Fasti, ii. 194; Memoirs of Colonel Hutchinson, ed. Firth, passim; Nichols, Lit. Anecdotes, viii. 389; Notes and Queries, 3rd ser. viii. 470). The father Henry was implicated in a disturbance that arose out of James II's proceedings against the charter of Nottingham corporation, and at the trial his name afforded Jeffreys an opportunity for one of his brutal pleasantries. His elder son John was father of Robert Plumptre.

Henry, born at Nottingham, was admitted a pensioner of Queens' College, Cambridge, on 19 Jan. 1697–8, and graduated B.A. in 1701–2, M.A. in 1705, and M.D. per literas regias in 1706. In the latter year he was one of those appointed by the university to carry a complimentary letter to the university of Frankfort on the occasion of its jubilee. On 15 February 1702–3 he was elected fellow of his college, but vacated the office by not taking orders on 4 July 1707. He was admitted a candidate of the College of Physicians on 22 Dec. 1707, and fellow on 23 Dec. 1708. He delivered the Gulstonian lectures in 1711, the Harveian oration in 1722, and on 19 March 1732–3 was appointed Lumleian lecturer. He was censor in 1717, 1722, 1723, and 1726, registrar from 1718 to 1722, treasurer on 13 July 1725, and consiliarius in 1735, 1738, and 1739. He was named an elect on 5 May 1727, and served as president for six years from 1740 to 1745. He was also physician at St. Thomas's Hospital, a post he resigned in 1736. He died on 26 November 1746 of an ulcer in his bladder. A portrait of Plumptre was presented by himself to the College of Physicians on 1 Oct. 1744. He was author of:

- ‘Dissertatio Medico-Physica de Carolinis Thermis,’ Magdeburg, 1695, 4to; another edition, 1705, 4to.
- ‘Oratio Anniversaria Harvæana,’ London, 1722, 4to.

He is also said to have written a pamphlet entitled ‘A serious Conference between Scaramouch and Harlequin,’ with reference to the controversy then raging between Dr. John Woodward and Dr. John Freind, and he devoted much time and energy to the fifth ‘Pharmacopœia Londinensis’ which appeared in 1746.

His son, Russell Plumptre (1709–1793), born on 4 January 1709, was admitted pensioner of Queens' College, Cambridge, on 12 June 1728, proceeded M.B. 1733, and M.D. 1738; he was admitted candidate of the College of Physicians on 30 September 1738, and fellow on 1 Octobter 1739. In 1741 he was appointed regius professor of physic at Cambridge. He died at Cambridge on 15 October 1793. His library was sold in 1796 (Mason's Gray, 1827, p. 328).
