= Mary Milner =

English writer and editor (1797–1863)

Mary Milner (née Compton, 1797 – 1863) was an English writer and editor.

She was born Mary Compton on 12 November 1797, the eldest daughter of Thomas Wilberforce Compton (a relative of William Wilberforce) and his wife Sarah. She was partly raised by her great-uncle Isaac Milner, President of Queens’ College, Cambridge, whose biography she later wrote. In February 1820 she married Joseph Milner, who became vicar of St Lawrence, Appleby, where she lived for the rest of her life. After eighteen years of raising their six children, Mary became a writer and editor of Christian and educational material as well as a prolific contributor to periodicals.

== Works ==
=== Author ===
- The Christian Mother, or, Maternal Duties Exemplified (1838)
- The Life of Dean Milner (1842)
- Sketches Illustrative of Important Periods in the History of the World (2 series, 1843 and 1846)
- The Garden, the Grove and the Field (1852)

=== Editor ===
- The Christian Lady’s Magazine, also called the Christian Mother’s Magazine and the Englishwoman’s Magazine (1844 – 1856), a monthly periodical inviting contributions on religion, scripture, broader arts and sciences, and female biography
- The People’s Gallery of Engravings (4 vols., 1848 – 50)
- An extension of Mrs Trimmer’s History of England to the marriage of Queen Victoria (1849)
- The Juvenile Scrap-Book (1850), co-edited with Bernard Barton and Agnes and Jane Strickland
- The Essentials of Christianity by Joseph Milner, her uncle (1855)
