= Isaac Milner =

British mathematician (1750–1820)

The Reverend Isaac Milner FRS
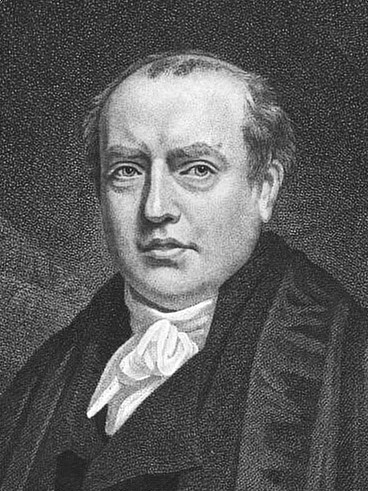
- Isaac Milner (1750–1820)
- Born: 11 January 1750; Mabgate, Leeds, England
- Died: 1 April 1820 (aged 70); Cambridge, England
- Education: University of Cambridge
- Known for: Chemical production of nitrous acid
- Relatives: Joseph Milner (brother)
- Scientific career
- Fields: Mathematician and chemist
- Workplaces: University of Cambridge

Isaac Milner FRS (11 January 1750 – 1 April 1820) was a mathematician, an inventor, the President of Queens' College, Cambridge and Lucasian Professor of Mathematics.

He was instrumental in the 1785 religious conversion of William Wilberforce and helped him through many trials and was a great supporter of the abolitionists' campaign against the slave trade, steeling Wilberforce with his assurance before the 1789 parliamentary debate:

If you carry this point in your whole life, that life will be better spent than in being prime minister of many years.

He was also a natural philosopher and the Dean of Carlisle.

== Biography ==
Milner was born on 11 January 1750 in Mabgate, Leeds. He began his education at a grammar school in Leeds in 1756, but this ended in 1760 with the death of his father. He was apprenticed as a weaver, reading the classics when time permitted, until his elder brother, Joseph Milner, provided him with an opportunity. Joseph was offered the mastership at Hull's grammar school and invited Isaac to become the institution's usher.

Through the patronage of his brother, Milner was subsequently freed from his duties in Hull and entered Queens' College, Cambridge, as a sizar in 1770. He graduated with a BA degree as senior wrangler in 1774, winning the first Smith's prize.

Shortly after he took his bachelor's degree he was ordained as deacon; in 1776 Queens' offered him a fellowship; in the following year he became a priest and college tutor; and in 1778 he was presented with the rectory of St Botolph's Church, Cambridge. However, he was a northerner at heart and thus was sent to reform the management of the Deanery of Carlisle. Taking a scientific approach to the Church of England's most northerly parishes he achieved success for the chapter and diocese. But Milner remained ambitious and seeking promotion he desired a return to Cambridge.

During these years his career as a natural philosopher began to take off. In 1776 Nevil Maskelyne hired him as a computer for the board of longitude, and two of his mathematical papers were presented to the Royal Society, of which he was elected fellow in 1780. In these papers Milner displayed three things: proficiency in mathematics, suspicion of French philosophy, and adherence to English Newtonian mechanics. In 1782 the Jacksonian professorship of natural philosophy was established and the syndicate selected Milner as the inaugural professor, a position he retained until 1792.

Besides lecturing, Milner also developed an important process to fabricate nitrous acid, a key ingredient in the production of gunpowder. His paper describing this process was published in the Royal Society's Philosophical Transactions in 1789 alongside an article of Joseph Priestley's, and the two corresponded on the subject. In later years Milner transferred his elaborate collection of chemical apparatus into the president's lodge at Queens' and performed experiments with E. D. Clarke, William Whewell, and the Wollaston brothers; he also collaborated with Humphry Davy and Joseph Banks in an attempt to cure gout.

Over the span of his forty-five-year career, Milner's scientific sentiments came to reflect his religious sentiments strongly. Although he never parted from the Anglican fold, he came to embrace the central evangelical doctrines of the late eighteenth century. Milner, with Charles Simeon, was largely responsible for the evangelical revival at Cambridge in post as Master of Queens' College. Indeed, throughout the years of his tenure he dramatically changed the entire complexion of the college. He was also responsible for the conversion of William Wilberforce, which occurred during their long continental tour of 1784–5. The act of Parliament of 1807 to abolish slavery owed much to their partnership. Milner's co-authorship of the seven-volume Ecclesiastical History of the Church of Christ (1818) with his brother Joseph also earned him nationwide renown.

After his death Milner was remembered for his astonishing intellect, his peculiar lifestyle, his tremendous physical bulk and his part in the rise in evangelicalism. Thomas De Quincey, in his preface to the Confessions of an English Opium-Eater, deemed Milner an 'eloquent and benevolent' opium user.

== See also ==
- Leeds Grammar School

== Sources ==
- Milner, Mary (1842). The Life of Issac Milner. 1862.

Academic offices
Preceded by Robert Plumptre	President of Queens' College, Cambridge; 1788–1820	Succeeded by Henry Godfrey
New office	Jacksonian Professor of Natural Philosophy; 1783–1792	Succeeded by Francis Wollaston
Preceded by Edward Waring	Lucasian Professor of Mathematics; 1798–1820	Succeeded by Robert Woodhouse
Church of England titles
Preceded by Jeffery Ekins	Dean of Carlisle; 1791–1820	Succeeded by Robert Hodgson
