= Great Gransden =

Village in Cambridgeshire, England

Coordinates: 52.184°N 0.143°W

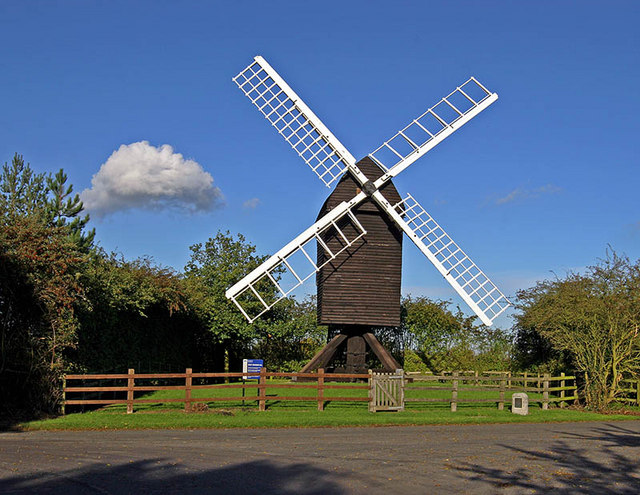
- Great Gransden Postmill

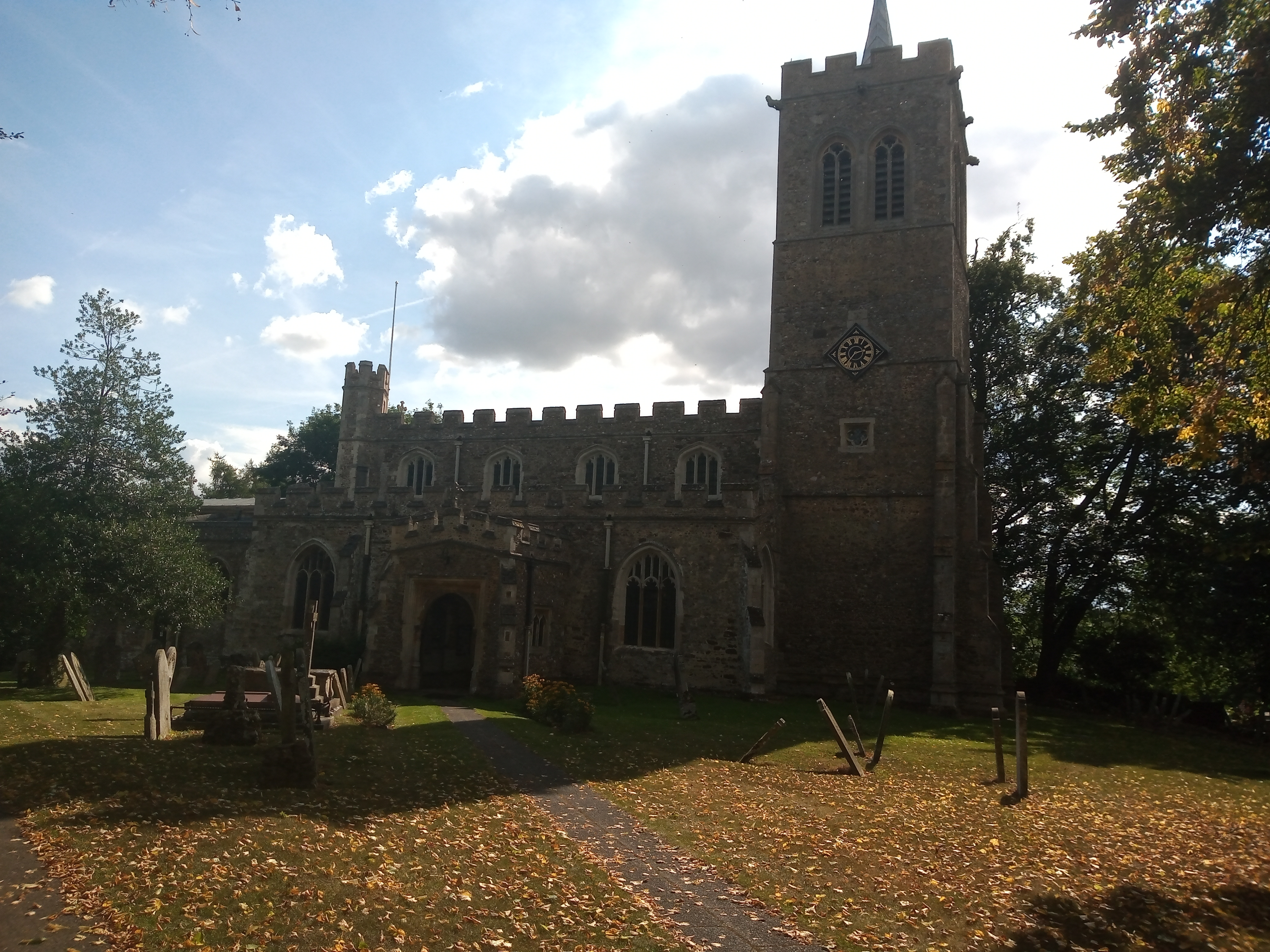
- St Bartholomew's Church, Great Gransden

- Location within Cambridgeshire
- Population: 1,023 (2011 Census)
- OS grid reference: TL276556
- District: Huntingdonshire
- Shire county: Cambridgeshire
- Region: East
- Country: England
- Sovereign state: United Kingdom
- Post town: SANDY
- Postcode district: SG19
- Dialling code: 01767
- Police: Cambridgeshire
- Fire: Cambridgeshire
- Ambulance: East of England
- UK Parliament: Huntingdon

Great Gransden is a civil parish and village in the Huntingdonshire district of Cambridgeshire, England. In 2001, the parish population was 969, which rose to 1,023 at the 2011 Census. It lies 16 miles (25 km) west of Cambridge and 13 miles (21 km) south of Huntingdon. It contains the oldest post mill in England.

== History ==
The village name translates as "valley of a man named Granta or Grante". It was spelled Grantandene in 973 and Grante(s)dene in the 1086 Domesday Book. Great Gransden was mentioned in 973 when its land was endowed to Thorney Abbey by Aethelwold, Bishop of Winchester. It already consisted of 33 households in 1086, with an annual rent of £30 being paid to the lord of the manor.

Great Gransden's older centre consists of cottages grouped round a 16th-century church, dedicated to Saint Bartholomew, whose tower dates from about 1390. The connection between the village and Clare College, Cambridge appears to date from 1346, when the advowson for Great Gransden church parish formed part of the college's original endowment.

=== School and founder ===
Barnabas Oley, Vicar from 1633, was a Fellow of Clare College who edited the works of the poet and orator George Herbert. Oley was one of the university's most active Royalists in the English Civil War. He was deprived of his fellowship and lodgings in 1644, but recovered them in 1660. From 1664 he lived mainly at Great Gransden and left many benefactions.

The village school Oley founded in 1670, now a Church of England primary school in Little Lane, still bears his name. His life is remembered each year on the school's Founder's Day, held in the parish church; leavers receive an "Oley Bible" from a Fellow of Clare College.

=== Notable people ===
In order of birth:

- Anne Dutton (1692–1765), religious tractarian and poet, and her clothier husband Benjamin, a Baptist minister, moved to the village and paid for a chapel to be built there.
- James Plumptre (1771–1832), dramatist, served as Vicar of Great Gransden church from 1812 until his death.
- Arthur Tozer Russell (1806–1874) hymn-writer, served as a curate of Great Gransden church in 1829–1830.

== Government ==
As a civil parish, Great Gransden has a parish council elected by the residents. The parish council has nine councillors and normally meets on the first Monday of the month in the Reading Room in Great Gransden.

Great Gransden was in the historic and administrative county of Huntingdonshire until 1965. From 1965, it was part of the new administrative county of Huntingdon and Peterborough, until the Local Government Act 1972 placed it in the county of Cambridgeshire in 1972.

The second tier of local government is Huntingdonshire District Council which is a non-metropolitan district of Cambridgeshire and has its headquarters in Huntingdon. Its 52 councillors represent 26 district wards. Great Gransden belongs to the district ward of Great Paxton, which has one councillor on the district council. The village's highest tier of local government is Cambridgeshire County Council, based in Alconbury Weald, It consists of 61 councillors representing 59 electoral divisions. where as part of the electoral division of St Neots East and Gransden, it is represented by one county councillor.

Great Gransden is in the parliamentary constituency of Huntingdon,. It has been represented in the House of Commons by Jonathan Djanogly (Conservative) since 2001. The previous member was Prime Minister John Major (Conservative), from 1997 to 2001.

== Geography ==
Great Gransden parish is 11 miles (18 km) west of the county town of Cambridge, 10 miles (16 km) south-east of Huntingdon and 47 miles (76 km) north of London. It covers an area of 3,402 acres (1,377 ha). The village stands on the B1046 road between Abbotsley, to the west, and Longstowe, to the east. Minor roads run south-west to Waresley and north-east to Caxton.

The parish ranges from 33 metres (108 ft), near its border with Abbotsley parish, to 75 metres (246 ft) above sea level on the disused airfield. The subsoil is Ampthill Clay with Lower Greensand. Streams in the parish include Waresley Dean, College Dean, Vicars Dean, Mandean and Gransden Brook; Home Dole Brook marks the border with Little Gransden parish and South Cambridgeshire.

== Demography ==
Between 1801 and 1901 the population of Great Gransden according to the ten-yearly censuses ranged between 412 (1801) and 713 (1871).

Parish	1911	1921	1931	1951	1961	1971	1981	1991	2001	2011
Great Gransden	470	458	395	396	476	520	666	814	1,019	1,023

All population census figures from report Historic Census figures Cambridgeshire to 2011 by Cambridgeshire Insight.

In 2011, the parish covered an area of 3,395 acres (1,374 hectares), giving it a population density in 2011 of 192.8 persons per square mile (74.5 per square km).

At the time of the 2001 census, Great Gransden parish had 363 households. 98.8 per cent of people described themselves as White, 0.3 per cent as Asian or Asian British, and 0.9 per cent as mixed; 77.6 per cent were Christians, 1.2 per cent followed another religion and 21.1 were not religious.

== Landmarks ==
Great Gransden boasts the oldest post mill in England, constructed around 1612 – though the claim is disputed by nearby Bourn. It has two storeys, with a flour-dressing machine, inscribed 1774 on the second floor. The mill ceased to operate about 1890. It was presented to the county council in 1950 and classified as an ancient monument in 1957. A restoration project was completed in 1984, and a more thorough restoration began in 2015. The mill still possesses its machinery. Newly constructed sails were installed by 2022. It can be viewed inside by appointment. A local legend claims a book of black magic entitled An Infidel's Bible was hidden in the mill in 1867, causing it to stop working. When the book was removed, the mill began to work again. If it is the oldest post mill in England, it is also the country's oldest surviving windmill to have sails, since it and the mill at Bourn are the oldest.

There are 53 other listed buildings in Great Gransden parish, including houses, barns and remains of a churchyard cross. The brick vicarage, north-west of the church, was built by Barnabas Oley, probably between 1660 and 1685.

A lychgate built in the churchyard in 1920 commemorates Great Gransden men who died in World War I.

== Church of St Bartholomew ==
The Grade I listed parish church dedicated to Saint Bartholomew the Apostle consists of a chancel with a 19th-century organ chamber, a vestry on the north side, nave, north aisle, south aisle, west tower and north and south porches. It was listed in the Domesday Book, but no remains of that time survive. The tower was built in the late 14th century, but the whole church rebuilt in the 15th. The organ chamber and vestry were added and the north porch rebuilt in 1873. A pulpit dating from 1600 and a rare clock, whose chime mechanism is said to date from 1683, are notable artefacts inside.

== Baptist chapel ==
The Providence Baptist Chapel in Sand Road is a Grade II listed building that dates from soon after 1734, when the tractarian Anne Dutton (see Notable people) and her husband moved here.

== Amenities ==
Great Gransden has a pub in West Street, the thatched Crown and Cushion, which also serves food. The village has a small general store with a sub-post office in Fox Street, and an antique shop in Hitchin Road. It also has a lawn tennis club, a bowls club, and a football team called the Gransden Chequers.

The first gardening allotments became available in 2008 through the Gransden Allotment Society. An orchard and "Greenfingers" micro-plots for children were added in 2009–2010, followed by a wildlife pond and a wildlife meadow in 2011. Tree-planting continues.

Gransden and District Agricultural Society Annual Show has been held most years since 1891, with exceptions including the Second World War and the COVID-19 pandemic. It takes place on the last Saturday of September.

== Transport ==
Great Gransden has occasional buses to and from St Neots and Cambridge. The nearest railway station is St Neots (7 miles, 11 km), which has regular services to Huntingdon and Biggleswade and peak-hour services to London King's Cross.

The village is 3 miles (5 km) from the main A428 road to Cambridge at Eltisley and 11 miles (18 km) from the A1 trunk road between London and the North at Wyboston.
