= George Phillips (orientalist) =

English churchman and academic

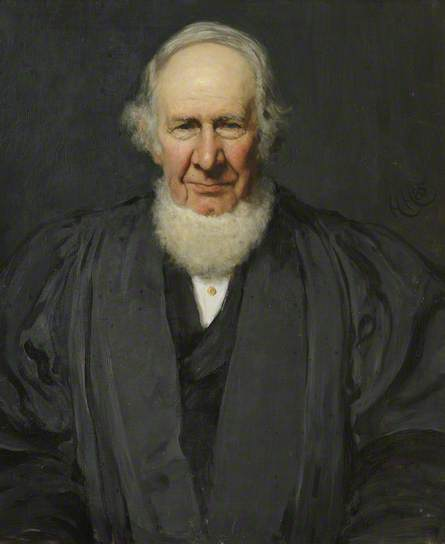
- Portrait of Phillips by Herman Herkomer, 1885.
- Born: 11 January 1804; Dunwich, Suffolk, England
- Died: 5 February 1892 (aged 87); Queens' College, Cambridge
- Education: Queens' College, Cambridge
- Occupation: Scholar
- Spouse: Emily Frances (m. 1848)

George Phillips (11 January 1804 – 5 February 1892), was an English churchman and academic, known as an orientalist and mathematician. He was also the Rector of Sandon, Essex, the President of Queens' College, Cambridge, from 1857 until his death and Vice-Chancellor of Cambridge University from 1861 to 1862.

== Early life and education ==
Born in Dunwich, Suffolk, he was the son of Francis Phillips, a farmer. After spending his early years in farm work, and acquiring a knowledge of mathematics in his spare time, Phillips became a master at the grammar school in Woodbridge, Suffolk, and later at that in Worcester. While at Worcester he published his first works, A Brief Treatise on the Use of a Case of Instruments (1823) and A Compendium of Algebra (1824).

In 1824 Phillips left Worcester in order to enter Magdalen Hall, Oxford, but after a short residence migrated to Queens' College, Cambridge, in October 1825. He won a scholarship in 1827 and graduated BA in 1829 with a first in mathematics.

== Career ==
In 1830 he was elected fellow of his college and subsequently became senior tutor. He was ordained deacon in 1831 and priest in 1832. On the death of Joshua King in 1852, he was elected president of Queens' where he lived for the rest of his life. In 1861–2 he was vice-chancellor of the University of Cambridge. As president of Queens' he was noted for his hospitality, and did much to promote the welfare of his college. He gave £1000 to found a scholarship in 1887 and made a generous donation towards building the new chapel in 1891.

As a fellow of Queens', Phillips had at first continued to study mathematics, but soon turned to Hebrew, which he began to teach in the college, although there was then little interest in the subject at Cambridge. He used his position to promote oriental studies in the university, and took a leading part in the establishment in 1872 of the Indian languages tripos and the Semitic languages tripos, examinations for which were first held in 1875. He published editions of several Syriac texts, and rewrote his earlier Elements as A Syriac Grammar (1866). Apart from his academic works, his only publication was Short Sermons on Old Testament Messianic Texts (1863).

== Personal life ==
He was a staunch conservative, unwilling to accept contemporary developments in biblical criticism.

In August 1848 he married Emily Frances (died 1898), daughter of Henry Pilkington, of Tore, County Westmeath, Ireland; they had no children. Phillips died at his residence in Queens' on 5 February 1892. His funeral service was held in the college on the 11th, but his body was buried at Mullingar in County Westmeath.

== Works ==
- Phillips, George (1864). Scholia on Passages of the Old Testament, by Mar Jacob, Bishop of Edessa. London and Edinburgh: Williams and Norgate.
- Phillips, George (1869). A Letter by Mār Jacob, Bishop of Edessa, on Syriac Orthography, also a Tract by the Same Author, and a Discourse by Gregory Bar Hebraeus on Syriac Accents. London and Edinburgh: Williams and Norgate.

== Sources ==
- J. W. Clark, ‘Phillips, George (1804–1892)’, rev. R. S. Simpson, Oxford Dictionary of National Biography, Oxford University Press, 2004 accessed 6 Nov 2014

Academic offices
| Preceded by Joshua King | President of Queens' College, Cambridge; 1857–1892 | Succeeded by William Magan Campion |
| Preceded by Latimer Neville | Vice-Chancellor of the University of Cambridge; 1861–2 | Succeeded by Edward Atkinson |
