= Henry Godfrey (academic) =

English clergyman and academic (1781–1832)

Henry Godfrey (1781 – 16 October 1832) was an English clergyman and academic, who served as President of Queens' College, Cambridge 1820–1832.

Henry Godfrey was the son of Henry Godfrey, a grocer of Newgate Street, London. He was admitted to St Paul's School, London in 1793, aged 12, and went to Queens' College, Cambridge with a St Paul's exhibition in 1798, graduating B.A. (13th Wrangler) 1802, M.A. 1805, B.D. 1813, D.D. 1822 (per lit. reg.).

He was ordained deacon in June 1802 and priest in December 1803, and was elected a Fellow of Queens' College in 1803.

Following the death of Isaac Milner, Godfrey was elected president of Queens' College on 9 April 1820. The election was challenged by two petitions to the Crown by Joshua King (then the junior fellow at Queens') and William Mandell (the defeated candidate). King argued that Godfrey was ineligible under the college statutes, and had not been admitted to the office in accordance with the statutes. Mandell's petition, signed by seven other fellows of Queens', argued that Mandell had won the election. In the first round of voting, Mandell had received the votes of 8 fellows out of 16. Mandell argued that Godfrey was not legally a fellow, as the college statutes mandated only one fellow from any county at the same time, and at the time of Godfrey's election as a fellow in 1803, there was already a fellow from Middlesex. Godfrey was therefore not eligible to participate in the election, and Mandell had won 8 votes out of 15, the requisite majority. The case was decided in the Court of Chancery by Lord Eldon, the lord chancellor, who ruled in favour of Godfrey.

Godfrey served as vice-chancellor of the University of Cambridge in 1822, and remained president of Queens' College until his death. He died on 16 October 1832, at the President's Lodge at Queens' College, and was buried in the crypt of Queens' College chapel. He was succeeded as president by Joshua King.
