= Joseph Milner (priest) =

English Anglican divine (1744–1797)

- Born: 1744; Leeds, England
- Died: 15 November 1797 (aged 52–53)
- Burial place: Holy Trinity Church
- Education: Leeds Grammar School, Catharine Hall, Cambridge
- Occupation: Anglican divine
- Notable work: History of the Church of Christ

Joseph Milner (1744–1797), an English evangelical divine, has a reputation particularly for his work on The History of the Church of Christ (1794–1809).

== Life ==
He was born at Leeds and educated at Leeds Grammar School and Catharine Hall, Cambridge. On graduation he went to Thorp Arch, West Yorkshire as assistant in a school kept by Christopher Atkinson, the vicar of the parish, received holy orders, and became Atkinson's curate. At Thorp Arch he made a lifelong friendship with the son of the vicar, Miles Atkinson, who subsequently became a leader of the evangelical party and vicar of St Paul's, Leeds.

Still in deacon's orders Milner left Thorp Arch to become headmaster of Hull Grammar School. There his pupils included William Dealtry, Samuel Marsden, George Pryme, Thomas Perronet Thompson, and Peter William Watson.

Milner was in 1768 elected afternoon lecturer at Holy Trinity Church, Hull. He now paid for the education of his brother Isaac Milner. In 1770 he became a follower of the rising evangelical school, suspected of Methodism, and the nature of his congregation at the High Church changed. He also undertook the charge of North Ferriby. Hull became a centre of evangelicalism.

Milner's chief friends were the Rev. James Stillingfleet (1741–1826) of Hotham, and the Rev. William Richardson of York, who both shared his religious views. In 1792 he had a severe attack of fever; in 1797 the mayor and corporation offered him the living of Holy Trinity, mainly through the efforts of William Wilberforce, but Milner fell ill and died on 15 November 1797. He was buried in Holy Trinity Church, and a monument to his memory was erected in it.

== Works ==
Milner's major work was the History of the Church of Christ (London, 1794–1809). He lived to complete the first three volumes, and two more were added by his brother, Isaac Milner (1750–1820), dean of Carlisle, who re-edited the whole work in 1810. John Scott (1777–1834) published a new continuation in three volumes (1826, 1829, and 1831). Samuel Roffey Maitland criticised Milner's history on the Waldenses (1832); the Rev. John King defended Milner, but Maitland published Strictures on Milner's Church History (1834). A controversy ensued, and the Milner's work had a new edition, published by the Rev. Thomas Grantham in 1847.

Other works published by Milner in his lifetime were:

- Gibbon's Account of Christianity considered, with some Strictures on Hume's Dialogues on Natural Religion, 1781.
- Some Remarkable Passages in the Life of William Howard, who died at North Ferriby on 2 March 1784, 1785.
- Essays on several Religious Subjects, chiefly tending to illustrate the Scripture Doctrine of the Influence of the Holy Spirit, 1789.

He published essays and numerous sermons. He also edited, with William Richardson, the Posthumous Works of Thomas Adam (1786).

After Milner's death many of his sermons were found, and these were published in four volumes under the title of Practical Sermons, (1800) with a memoir by the editor, Isaac Milner; and the second (1809), edited by the Rev. W. Richardson. These two were later republished together. A third volume (1823) was edited by the Rev. John Fawcett, and a fourth (1830), On the Epistles to the Seven Churches, the Millennium, the Church Triumphant, and the 130th Psalm, by Edward Bickersteth. In 1855 Milner's Essentials of Christianity, theoretically and practically considered, which had been left in manuscript, and had been revised by his brother, was edited for the Religious Tract Society by Mary Milner, the orphan niece of whom Joseph Milner had taken charge, and writer of her uncle Isaac's Life.

== Notes ==
Attribution:

- This article incorporates text from a publication now in the public domain: Lee, Sidney, ed. (1894). "Milner, Joseph". Dictionary of National Biography. Vol. 38. London: Smith, Elder & Co.
