= Simon Haynes (priest) =

English cleric, Dean of Exeter (died 1552)

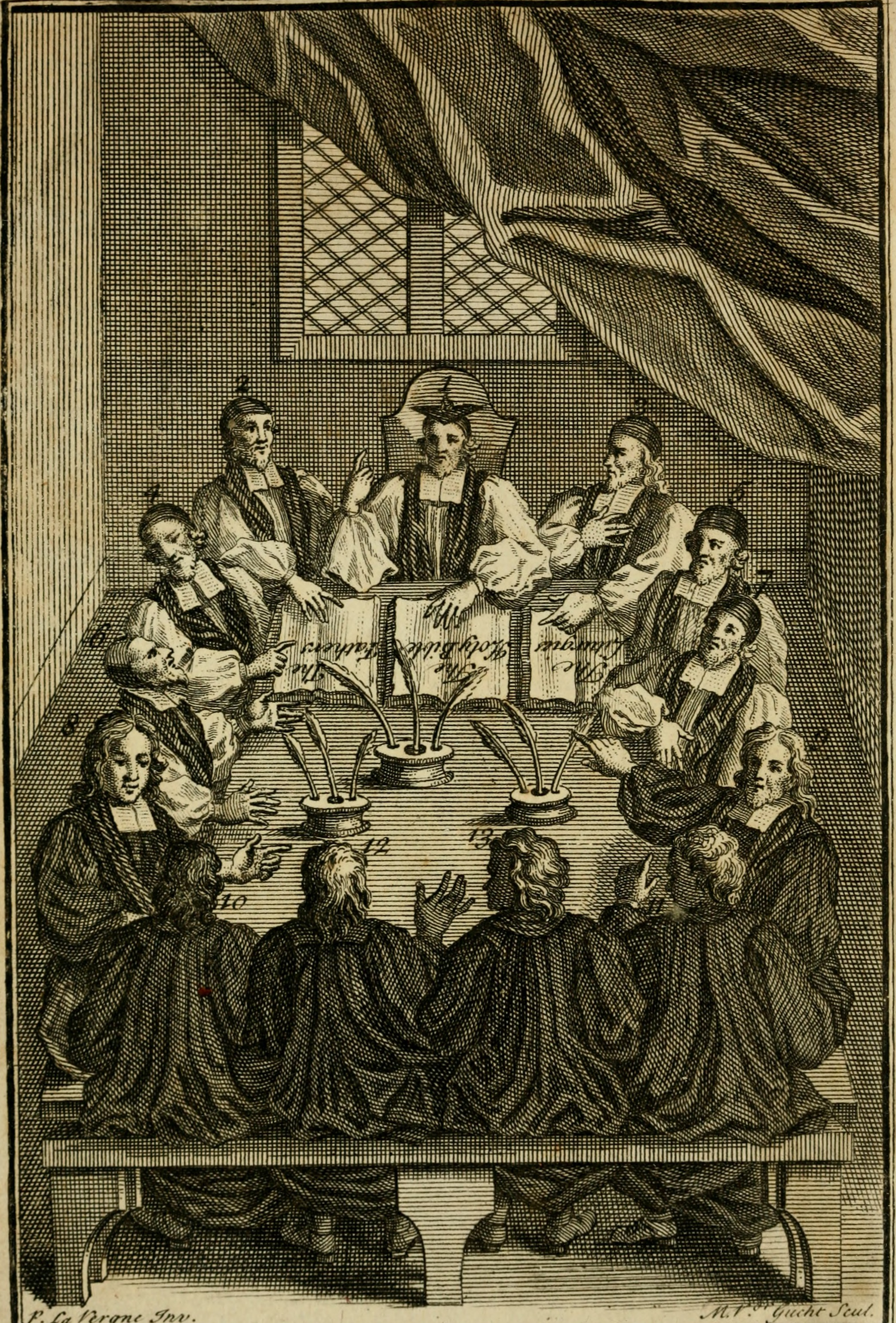
An exposition of the Book of Common Prayer, featuring Simon Heynes, at #12, Archbishop Thomas Cranmer, and others

Simon Haynes or Heynes (died 1552) was Dean of Exeter, Ambassador to France, and a signatory of the decree that invalidated the marriage of Henry VIII with Anne of Cleves. He became President of Queens' College at the University of Cambridge from 1529 to 1537, and toward the end of his life, was installed Canon of Windsor at Windsor Castle.

== Life ==
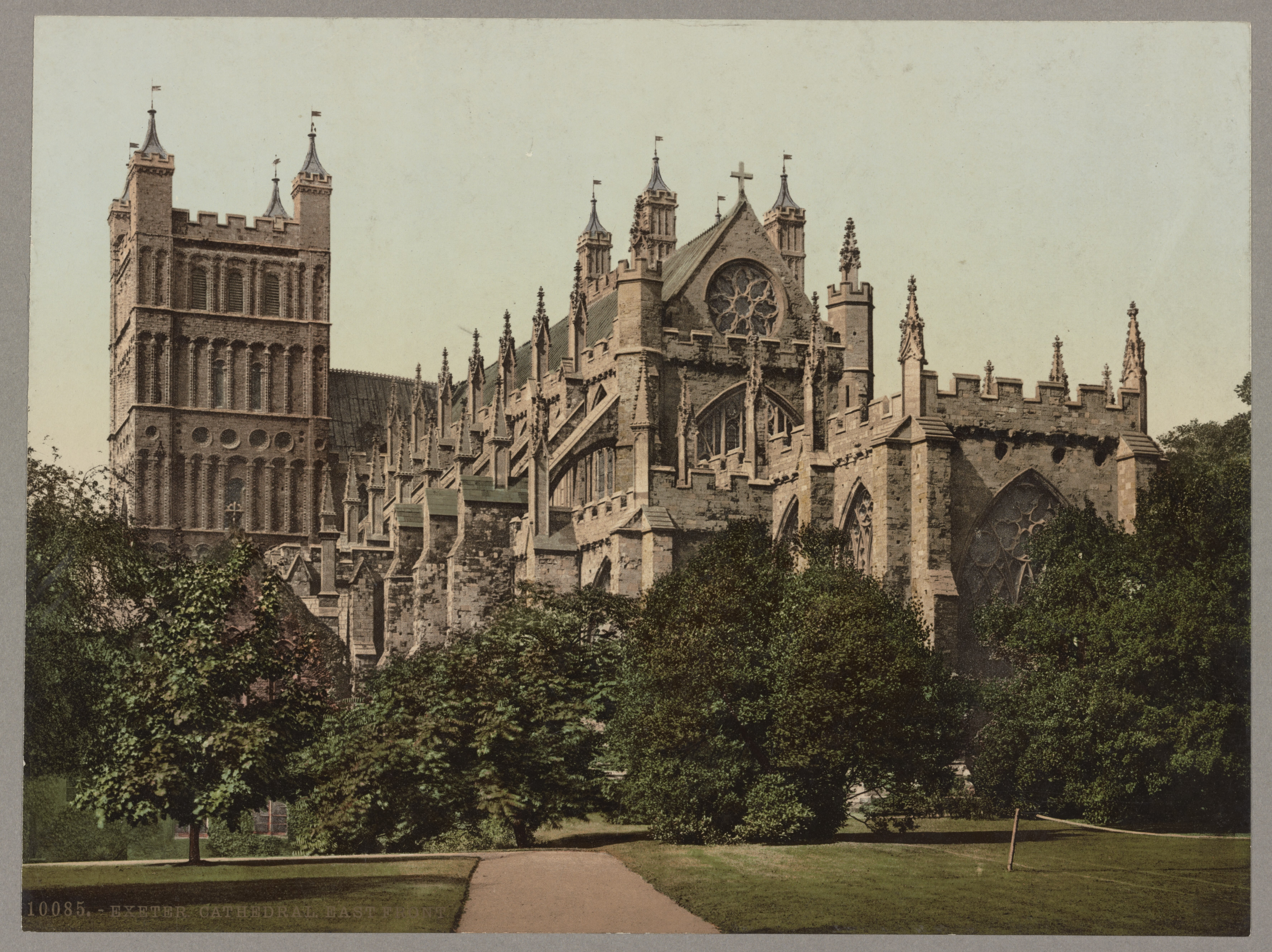
Exeter Cathedral, where Simon Heynes assumed the role of Dean of Exeter

Haynes was educated at Queens' College, Cambridge. He graduated B.A. in 1516, was elected fellow of his college in 1516, proceeded M.A. in 1519, and had a title for orders from Queens' College in February 1521. He took part in the expulsion of Dr. John Jennins from the presidency of Queens' in 1518, and in 1528 was himself elected president. Being empowered by the college to make bargains and covenants at his discretion, he alienated some of the estates belonging to the society.

On 28 November 1528 Haynes was instituted to the rectory of Barrow, Suffolk. He was one of the delegates appointed by the senate to make a determination as to the king's divorce in 1529–30; commenced D.D. in 1531, and in 1532–3 and 1533–4 served the office of Vice-chancellor. On 23 May 1533 he attested Archbishop Thomas Cranmer's instrument of divorce at Dunstable, implicating Catherine of Aragon, and in 1534 was admitted vicar of Stepney, Middlesex. During that year he and Bishop John Skip, the chaplain of Queen Anne Boleyn, were selected by the court to preach at Cambridge against papal supremacy.

In 1535, Henry VIII sent Haynes with diplomat Christoper Mount, an agent of Thomas Cromwell, to France as an Ambassador. The aim was to convince reformer Philip Melanchthon, a collaborator of Martin Luther, to come back to England. The mission eventually failed but they kept good contact. At the end of the same year he was instituted to the rectory of Fulham, Middlesex, and on 24 December was installed canon of Windsor at Windsor Castle.

On 16 July 1537 he was elected Dean of Exeter, and in that capacity he attended the baptism of Prince Edward Tudor; and soon afterwards resigned the presidency of Queens' College. A letter in condemnation of the bill of the Six Articles, addressed by him to a member of parliament, is printed in John Strype's Ecclesiastical Memorials.

In 1538 Haynes and Edmund Bonner, the Bishop of London, were sent to Spain, and joined Sir Thomas Wyatt, the Ambassador there. Offended by Wyatt's treatment of them, they later charged him with holding traitorous correspondence with Cardinal Reginald Pole and speaking disrespectfully of the king. Haynes signed the decree of 9 July 1540 invalidating the marriage of Henry VIII with Anne of Cleves, and on the following 17 Dec. the king made him one of the first prebendaries of Westminster.

Haynes was a visitor of the university of Oxford, the college of Windsor, and Exeter Cathedral, and one of the commissioners against the Anabaptists. He also assisted in the compilation of the first English liturgy. He died in October 1552, leaving by his wife Joan Waleron, daughter of Nicholas Waleron, (who then married Archbishop William May) two sons, Joseph and Simon.

== Notes ==
Attribution

This article incorporates text from a publication now in the public domain: Stephen, Leslie; Lee, Sidney, eds. (1891). "Heynes, Simon". Dictionary of National Biography. Vol. 26. London: Smith, Elder & Co.

Religious titles
| Preceded by Reginald Pole | Dean of Exeter; 1537–1552 | Succeeded by James Haddon |
