= Thomas Horton (Gresham College) =

English clergyman

Thomas Horton D.D. (died 1673) was an English clergyman, Professor of Divinity at Gresham College in London, and President of Queens' College, Cambridge.

== Life ==
A native of London, he was son of Laurence Horton, merchant, and a member of the Mercers' Company. He was admitted a pensioner of Emmanuel College, Cambridge, 8 July 1623, proceeding B.A. in 1626, was elected a Fellow of his college, and commenced M.A. in 1630. From 12 July 1638 until 28 November 1640 he was minister of St. Mary Colechurch, London, a donative of the Mercers' Company. He was elected professor of divinity in Gresham College, London, on 26 October 1641.

In 1644, Horton was one of the association of divines appointed by the parliament to ordain ministers in and near the city of London, and in the year following he subscribed the petition of the ministers of the province of London to the parliament, in which they prayed for the speedy establishment of the Presbyterian government in Congregational, classical, and national assemblies. He was a member of Gray's Inn, and from 18 May 1647 until 1657 was preacher there.

He was made President of Queens' College, Cambridge, in 1647. In 1649 he was created D.D. at Cambridge. In 1649 he was chosen vice-chancellor, and with the heads of houses carried new regulations for the government of the presses and printers of the university. About 1651 he married, and although he procured from the committee of parliament for reforming the universities an order that his marriage should not disqualify him for his professorship, the Gresham committee, acting in accordance with the founder's will, declared the place vacant. The committee did not proceed to a new election until 19 May 1656, when George Gifford was chosen, but Horton obtained a new dispensation from Cromwell, and remained in possession until the Restoration. Charles II granted him a temporary respite in 1660, but in 1661 Gifford took his place.

On 9 August 1652 Horton was incorporated D.D. at Oxford, and in 1658 he was nominated one of the triers or commissioners for the approbation of young ministers. In 1654 he was appointed by Oliver Cromwell one of the visitors of the university of Cambridge. On 5 November in that year he preached at St. Paul's Cathedral before the lord mayor and court of aldermen, and his sermon was printed.

At the Restoration (England), on 2 August 1660 he was removed from the presidency of Queens' College, Cambridge, to make room for Edward Martin, who had been ejected in 1644. Horton withdrew with good grace. When the Savoy Conference was appointed, Horton was nominated an assistant on the side of the Presbyterians, though, according to Richard Baxter, he never joined in the deliberations. He was one of the divines who were silenced by the Bartholomew Act in 1662, but he conformed soon afterwards, On 13 June 1666 he was admitted to the rectorship of Great St. Helen's in Bishopsgate Street, London, and held it until his death. He was buried in the chancel of that church (29 March 1673), leaving a widow, but no children.

His biographer, John Wallis, who had been under his tuition at Cambridge, says he was "a pious and learned man, an hard student, a sound divine, a good textuary, very well skilled in the oriental languages, very well accomplished for the work of the ministry, and very conscientious in the discharge of it".

== Works ==
He published eight single sermons and left many others prepared for the press. After his death were published: 1. Forty-six Sermons upon the whole Eighth Chapter of the Epistle to the Romans, London 1674, fol., edited by Dr. William Dillingham. 2. A Choice and Practical Exposition upon the 4, 47, 51, and 63 Psalms, London 1675, fol. 3. One Hundred Select Sermons upon Several Texts: Fifty upon the Old Testament, And Fifty on the New, London 1679, fol., with the author's life by John Wallis.

He and Dillingham prepared for press a treatise written by Dr. John Arrowsmith entitled Armilla Catechetica, Cambridge, 1659, 4to.

== Notes ==
Academic offices
Preceded by Richard Holdsworth	Gresham Professor of Divinity; 1641–1647	Succeeded by George Gifford
Preceded by Herbert Palmer	President of Queens' College, Cambridge; 1647–1660	Succeeded by Edward Martin
Preceded by Anthony Tuckney	Vice-Chancellor of the University of Cambridge; 1649–1650	Succeeded by Benjamin Whichcote
