= Anne Dutton =

English poet and religious writer (1692–1765)

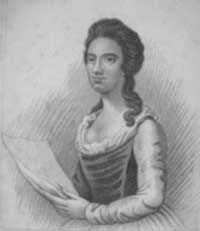
- Dutton from Letters on Spiritual Subjects 1884
- Born: 1692; Northampton, England, Kingdom of England
- Died: 1765 (aged 72–73)
- Burial place: Great Gransden, England, United Kingdom
- Spouse: Benjamin Dutton (died)

Anne Dutton (1692–1765) was an English poet and Baptist writer on religion. She published around 50 titles and corresponded with George Whitefield and John Wesley.

== Life ==
Born in Northampton, she survived a near-fatal childhood illness, from which "she acquired an acute sense of sin." Calvinistic doctrine influenced her upbringing, and thus, she was given a religious education.

At 22 she married a Mr Coles, living in London and Warwick, before being widowed five years later. She married again to Benjamin Dutton, a clothier who entered the Baptist ministry. They settled at Great Gransden, Huntingdonshire, in 1732, and paid for a chapel to be built there. A desire to give "service to the Cause of Christ" gradually overcame her ill health. In 1747, her husband travelled to America to raise money, but she became widowed again when his return ship was lost at sea.

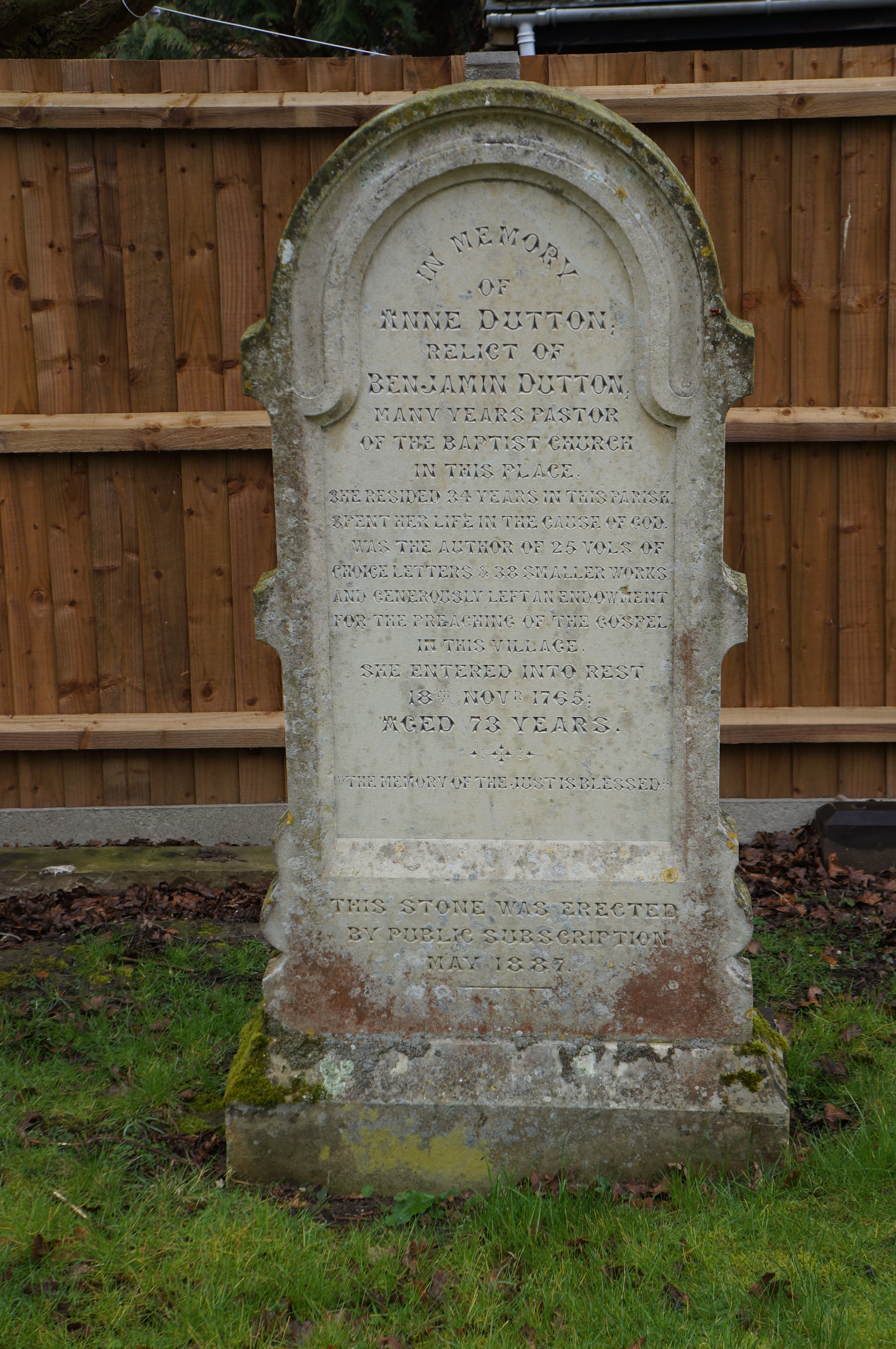
The Gravestone of Anne Dutton, Great Gransden, England

== Tracts ==
Dutton's Narration of the Wonders of Grace (1734) was a 1,500-line poem in heroic couplets, complete with marginal references to Scripture, reviewing redemption history from the point of view of Calvinist Baptists. (A modern scholar has called it "execrable verse, interesting only as testimony to the mental tilt of a particular kind of zealot".) In her correspondence with Wesley she differed with him over the question of Election. A Brief Account of the Negroes Converted to Christ in America was one of 13 tracts and letters she published in 1743 alone. George Whitefield was another recipient of her work.

Selections from her work were republished in six volumes in 2003–2009.

== Rhetoric in Dutton's Letters ==
Through letters, Dutton frequently debated with prominent theologians, George Whitfield and John Wesley. Dutton's use of rhetorical techniques is seen in her rebuttals to Wesley's beliefs about the doctrine of unconditional election – the idea that God specifically chooses particular individuals for eternal salvation. In one of these letters to Wesley, Dutton employs analogy – defined by Richard Whately as “'an argument ‘in which the instance adduced is somewhat more remote from that to which it is applied.'” She alludes to the well-known narrative of Jacob and Esau, identifying God's favor of one brother (Jacob) over the other (Esau). She then applies this idea of God's unconditional favor to persons of succeeding generations, rendering the two examples analogous.

In another letter to Wesley, Dutton uses a rhetorical device often seen in Old Testament writing: parallelism. Coupled words and phrases in her letter include: “blame” and “wrath,” along with, “set them before thee” and “bring them safe to Glory.” In doing so, Dutton combines Greco-Roman (logos, ethos, and pathos) as well as Jewish rhetorical techniques (parallelism) to refute Wesley’s claim that unconditional election is not grounded in scripture. Dutton references Scripture numerous times in her letters to Wesley and shows a thorough command of Biblical prose. She employs covenant language which also acts as rhetorical strategy used to sway Wesley away from his opposition to the truth of the Gospels. Such covenantal language includes an allusion to Genesis 43:9 when Judah offers his word to Jacob that he will not only safely take Benjamin to Egypt, but safely bring him home. Her use of covenant language aligns with the idea that "G/d is the master-rhetorician." Together, these elements illustrate Dutton’s consistent use of classical and biblical rhetorical strategies in her correspondence with Wesley.

== Works ==
- A narration of the wonders of grace in verse. Divided into six parts. I. Of Christ the Mediator, as set up from Everlasting in all the Glory of Headship. II. Of God's Election and Covenant-Transactions concerning a Remnant in his Son. III. Of Christ's Incarnation and Redemption. IV. Of the Work of the Spirit, respecting the Church in general, throughout the New Testament Dispensation, from Christ's Ascension to his second Coming. V. Of Christ's glorious Appearing and Kingdom. VI. Of Gog and Magog; together with the last Judgment. To which is added, A poem on the special Work of the Spirit in the Hearts of the Elect. As also, sixty one hymns composed on several Subjects. With An Alphabetical Table, 1734
- A discourse upon walking with God in a letter to a friend. Together with Some Hints upon Joseph's Blessing, Deut. 33. 13, &c. As also a brief Account how the Author was brought into Gospel-Liberty, 1735
- A discourse concerning God's act of adoption To which is added, a discourse upon the inheritance of the Adopted Sons of God, 1737
- A discourse concerning the new-birth to which are added two poems; the one on salvation in Christ, by free-grace, for the chief of sinners: the other on a believer's safety and duty, 1740
- A letter to all the saints : on the general duty of love: humbly presented, by one that is less than the least of them all, and unworthy to be of their happy Number, 1742
- A letter to the Reverend Mr. John Wesley In vindication of the doctrines of absolute, unconditional election, particular redemption, special vocation, and final perseverance, 1742
- A letter from Mrs. Anne Dutton, to the Reverend Mr. G. Whitefield, 1743
- A Letter to Such of the Servants of Christ, who May have any Scruple about the Lawfulness of PRINTING any Thing written by a Woman, 1743
- Letters on spiritual subjects, and divers occasions, sent to relations and friends. By one who has tasted that the Lord is gracious, 1743
- A brief account of the gracious dealings of God with a poor, sinful... creature, 1750
- Divine, moral, and historical Miscellanies, 1761
