= Edward Martin (Queens') =

English clergyman

Edward Martin, D.D. (died 1662) was an English clergyman, ejected President of Queens' College, Cambridge, and at the end of his life Dean of Ely.

== Life ==
A native of Cambridgeshire, he matriculated in the University of Cambridge, as a sizar of Queens' College, 5 July 1605. He graduated B.A. in 1608–9, M.A. in 1612, was elected a Fellow of his college 11 March 1617, and proceeded B.D. in 1621.

In 1627 he was chaplain to Archbishop William Laud, and he offended the Puritan party by licensing a book by Thomas Jackson, called An Historical Narration, and also by preaching a sermon at St Paul's Cross against Presbyterianism. He became vicar of Oakington in 1626 and rector of Conington, Cambridgeshire, in 1630. He was elected President of Queens' College 16 October 1631, being in the same year created D.D. by royal mandate. He was also rector of the Church of St Peter and St Paul, Uppingham, Rutland, from 1631 to 1637, where he was succeeded by Jeremy Taylor. In 1638 he was instituted to the rectory of Houghton Conquest, Bedfordshire, and soon afterwards to that of Doddington, Cambridgeshire.

In August 1642 he sent the college plate to the king. Oliver Cromwell thereupon surrounded several colleges with soldiers, and took away by force the masters of Queens', Jesus College, and St John's College, and hurrying them to London, incarcerated them in the Tower of London by order of parliament. Martin was afterwards removed to Lord Petre's house in Aldersgate Street, where he drew up the mock petition, entitled his Submission to the Covenant. Subsequently, he was remanded to Ely House and other places of confinement for more than five years. In the meanwhile he was ejected from the presidency of Queens' College, and lost all his other preferments.

About August 1648 he effected his escape, and went to Thorington, Suffolk, where he resided with Henry Cooke, who had been a member of his college. He assumed the name of Matthews, but was discovered by some soldiers from Great Yarmouth, was brought to London, and on 23 May 1650 was committed to the Gatehouse Prison by John Bradshaw, president of the council of state. Ultimately, by some interest with Colonel Wanton, he obtained his release and a pardon for breaking prison. He then returned to Suffolk and resumed his own name; but subsequently he went abroad for seven or eight years, during most of which time he lived at Paris with Christopher Hatton, 1st Baron Hatton. In 1656 he was resident at Utrecht with many other royalists.

Returning to England at the Stuart Restoration, he was formally restored to the presidency of Queens' College, on 2 August 1660. He was one of the managers of the Savoy Conference. In February 1662 he was nominated to the deanery of Ely, and was installed by proxy, 25 April 1662. He died three days afterwards on 28 April 1662, and was buried in the college chapel.

Academic offices
Preceded by John Mansell	President of Queens' College, Cambridge; 1631–1644	Succeeded by Herbert Palmer
Preceded by Thomas Horton	President of Queens' College, Cambridge; 1660–1662	Succeeded by Anthony Sparrow
