= William John Beamont =

English clergyman and author (1828–1868)

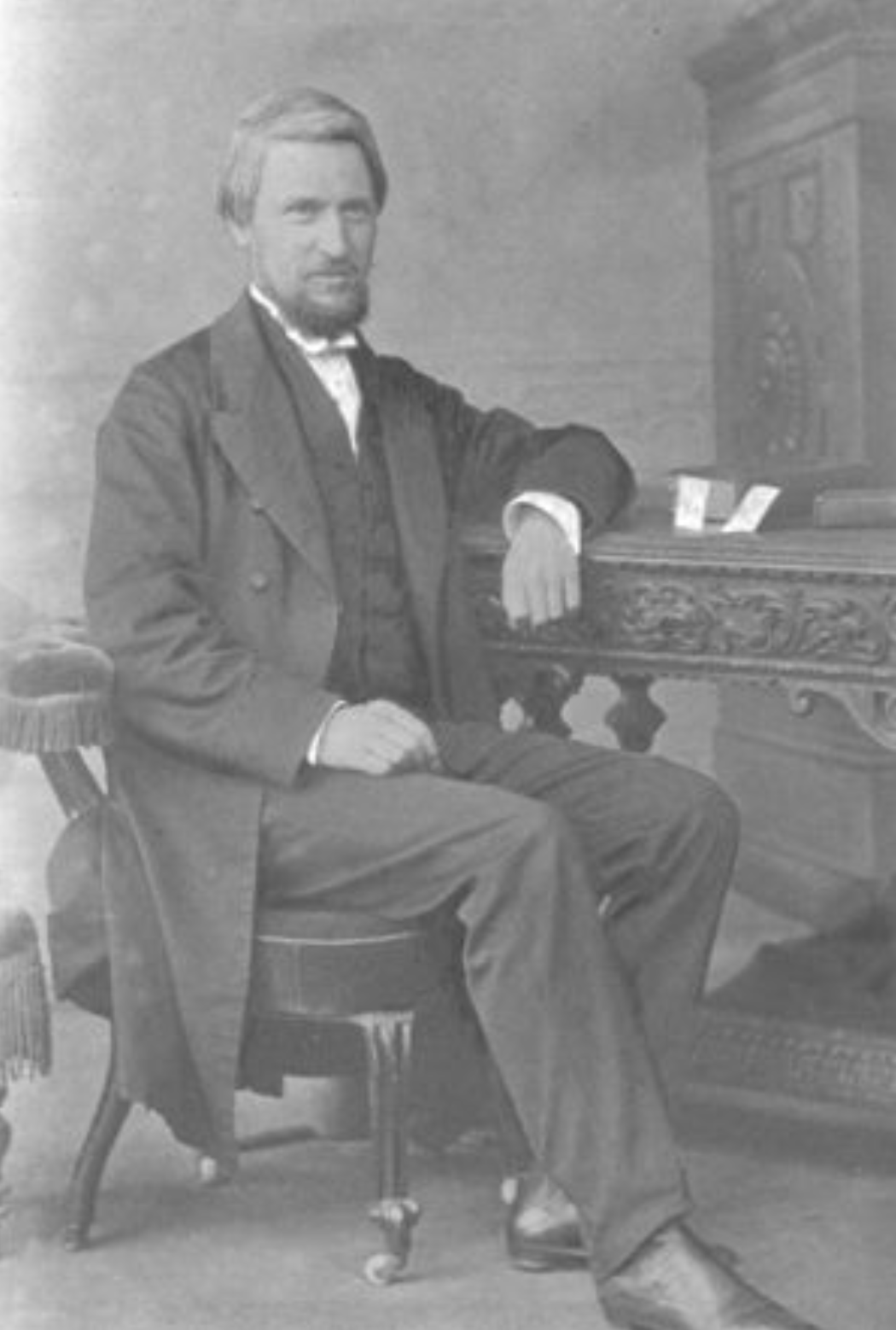
William John Beamont.

William John Beamont (1828–1868) was an English clergyman, founder of the Cambridge School of Art, current Anglia Ruskin University, and author.

== Early life and education ==
Beamont was born at Warrington, Lancashire, 16 January 1828, being the only son of William Beamont, solicitor and author of Annals of the Lords of Warrington, and other works. After attending Warrington grammar school for five years, in 1842 he was removed to Eton College, where he remained till 1846, winning Prince Albert's prize for modern languages, the Newcastle medal and other prizes. He entered Trinity College, Cambridge, in 1846, took high honours, gained the chancellor's medal, and was awarded a fellowship in 1852. He graduated B.A. in 1850, and M.A. in 1853.

== The Arab Tour ==
After his election as fellow of Trinity he commenced a tour in Egypt and Palestine, and on being ordained in 1854 he spent some time at Jerusalem, where he engaged earnestly in the education of intending missionaries to Abyssinia, in Sunday school work, and in preaching not only to the English residents but to the Arabs in their own tongue.

== Crimean War ==
He afterwards acted as chaplain in the camp hospitals of the British Army before Sevastopol, Russia next to the Black Sea during the Crimean War. The United Kingdom, France, and the Ottoman Empire fought against the Russian Empire from 1853 until 1856.

== Vicarage in Cambridge ==
In 1855 Beamont returned home, and became curate of St. John's, Broad Street, Drury Lane, London, in which parish he worked with great zeal until 1858, when he accepted the vicarage of St. Michael's, Cambridge.

== Founding father ==
Beamont's life was one of unremitting self-denying usefulness, and in addition to his successful parochial labours and his pioneer efforts for church extension in Barnwell and Chesterton, he was the main instrument of founding the Cambridge School of Art (1858) and the Church Defence Association (1859). The Cambridge School of Art created the foundation for Anglia Ruskin University (ARU). He was also the originator of the Church Congress (1861), in the foundation of which he was aided by his friend, R. Reynolds Rowe, F.S.A.

== Death ==
He died at Cambridge, 6 Aug. 1868, at the age of forty, his death being hastened by a fever caught in the East. He was buried in Trinity College Chapel.

== Works ==
- Catherine, the Egyptian Slave, 1852.
- Concise Grammar of the Arabic Language, 1861.
- Cairo to Sinai and Sinai to Cairo, in November and December 1860, 1861.

In conjunction with Canon W. M. Campion he wrote a learned yet popular exposition of the Book of Common Prayer, entitled The Prayer-Book Interleaved, 1868. Among his pamphlets are the Catechumen's Manual, Paper on Clergy Discipline, and Fine Art as a Branch of Academic Study
