= Thomas Adam =

English clergyman and religious writer

Thomas Adam (25 February 1701 – 31 March 1784) was a Church of England clergyman and religious writer.

== Biography ==
He was born at Leeds, West Yorkshire, on 25 February 1701: his father Henry Adam was a solicitor and town clerk of the Leeds Corporation, his mother Elizabeth, daughter of Jasper Blythman. They had six children, of whom Thomas was the third.

Adam received his first education at Leeds Grammar School, then under Thomas Barnard; later he was transferred to Queen Elizabeth Grammar School, Wakefield. He matriculated at Christ's College, Cambridge in 1720, where he was for two years. He then moved to Hart Hall, Oxford, through the influence of Richard Newton. He took the degree of B.A., but took no further degree on account of certain scruples in Newton's book on "Pluralities". In 1724 he was presented, through the interest of an uncle, to the living of Winteringham, in the Lincolnshire (now North Lincolnshire). He was then under age ecclesiastically, and it was held for a year for him. Here he remained for 58 years, never wishing to change. His income rarely exceeded £200 per annum.

Adam died on 31 March 1784, in his 84th year.

== Works ==
Adam experienced an evangelical conversion around 1748. He published:

- Practical Lectures on the Church Catechism (1753, nine or ten editions), which influenced William Romaine.
- Evangelical Sermons
- Paraphrase and Annotations on the First Eleven Chapters of St. Paul's Epistle to the Romans.
- Paraphrase and Annotations on the Four Gospels (posthumously published and reprinted, 1837).

Adam's Posthumous Works (1786) were edited by James Stillingfleet (1741–1826), with his close clerical associates Joseph Milner and William Richardson of York. A selection of diary entries from these Posthumous Works, entitled Private Thoughts on Religion, is now the best-known work by Adam. Coleridge's annotated copy of this short volume from 1795 is in the British Library. Reginald Heber, Thomas Chalmers, and John Stuart Mill, and others have found it interesting.

== Family ==
Adam married in 1730 Susan Cooke, daughter of James Cooke (died 1727), vicar of Roxby cum Risby nearby. She died in 1760. They had one daughter only, who died young.
