= Peter William Watson =

English merchant and botanist (1761–1830)

Peter William Watson (1761–1830) was an English merchant and botanist.

== Life ==
He was born at Kingston upon Hull in 1761, and baptised at Holy Trinity Church there on 26 August. Educated at Hull grammar school under Joseph Milner, he went into trade as a merchant.

Watson's interests included botany, entomology, chemistry, and mineralogy, and he was a landscape-painter. He traversed the East Riding in his gig, systematically botanising, and in 1812 was involved in setting up the Hull botanic garden. He was elected a fellow of the Linnean Society in 1824.

Watson died at Cottingham, near Hull, on 1 September 1830.

== Works ==
In 1824–5 Watson issued, in twenty-four parts, Dendrologia Britannica; or Trees and Shrubs that will live in the Open Air of Britain throughout the year (London, 2 vols. 1825). John Claudius Loudon described this work as "the most scientific work devoted exclusively to trees which has hitherto been published in England." It contained an introduction to descriptive botany, and 172 coloured plates of exotic trees and shrubs, accompanied by technical description.
