= Robert Birkenshaw =

English priest (died 1526)

Robert Birkenshaw (also Bekensall and Bekensaw) D.D. (d. 1526) was a Canon of Windsor from 1512 to 1525.

== Career ==
He was appointed:

- President of Queens' College, Cambridge 1508 - 1519
- Rector of Revesby, Lincolnshire until 1505
- Vicar of Croxton 1505
- Rector of St Michael the Archangel's Church, Chagford, Devon 1510
- Rector of Bradwell-super-Mare, Essex 1512
- Treasurer of Lincoln 1513
- Chaplain and Almoner to Catherine of Aragon
- Dean of Stoke-by-Clare 1517
- Prebendary of Lincoln 1523

He was appointed to the first stall in St George's Chapel, Windsor Castle in 1512, and held the stall until 1525.
