= John Stokes (archdeacon of York) =

English theologian (died 1568)

John Stokes (died 29 April 1568) was Archdeacon of York and President of Queens' College, Cambridge.

Stokes was educated at The King's School, Canterbury and Queens' College, Cambridge, graduating B.A. 1540/1, M.A. 1544, B.D. 1549, D.D. 1564. He was a Fellow of Queens' College 1543–1560, and was also appointed one of the founding Fellows of Trinity College in 1546. He served as University chaplain and librarian (both 1556–1568), President of Queens' College 1560–1568, and Vice-Chancellor of the University of Cambridge 1565–66.

In the church, Stokes was Archdeacon of York 1560–1568, Prebendary of Southwell Minster 1564–1568, and Vicar of Mexborough.

He died on 29 April 1568, and was buried in Queens' College chapel.
