= Jean-François Senault =

French Augustinian philosopher

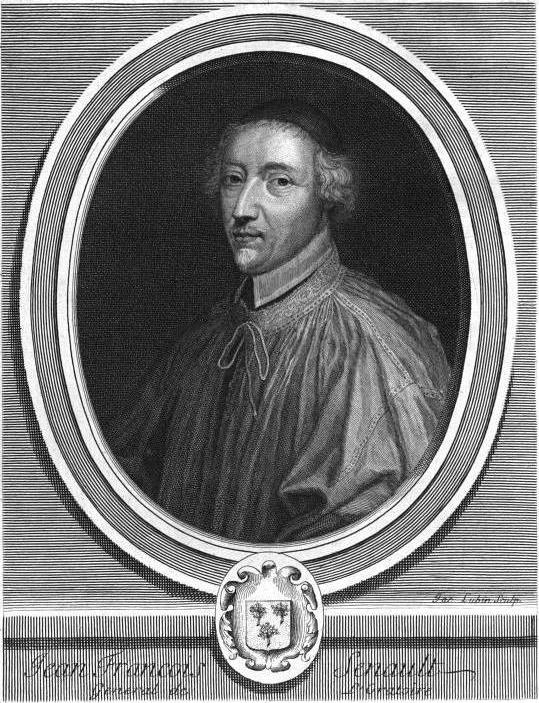
Jean-François Senault.

Jean-François Senault (1599–1672) was a French Augustinian philosopher.

== Works ==
- Paraphrase Svr Iob (1637)
- De l'usage des passions (1641)
- Le Monarque, ou Le Devoir du Souverain (1661)
