= James Plumptre =

English clergyman and playwright (1771–1832)

The Reverend James Plumptre
- Portrait by Hepburn Mitchelson
- Born: 2 October 1771; President's Lodge, Queens' College, Cambridge, England
- Died: 23 January 1832 (aged 60); Great Gransden, Huntingdonshire, England
- Resting place: St Bartholomew's Church
- Education: Newcome's School; Queens' College, Cambridge; Clare College, Cambridge
- Occupations: Clergyman; playwright; writer
- Notable work: The Lakers (1798); The English Drama Purified (1812); Three Discourses on the Case of the Animal Creation, and the Duties of Man to Them (1816)
- Spouse: Elizabeth Robinson (m. 1815)
- Father: Robert Plumptre
- Relatives: Anne Plumptre (sister); Annabella Plumptre (sister)

James Plumptre (2 October 1771 – 23 January 1832) was an English Anglican clergyman, playwright and writer. He wrote plays, sermons and religious works, and advocated the moral reform of the theatre. His publications on the treatment of animals included Three Discourses on the Case of the Animal Creation, and the Duties of Man to Them (1816), which incorporated a sermon delivered before the University of Cambridge in 1796.

Plumptre also kept journals of eight tours through Britain between 1790 and 1800. Selections were published in 1992 as James Plumptre's Britain: The Journals of a Tourist in the 1790s.

== Life and career ==
Plumptre was born at the President's Lodge, Queens' College, Cambridge, on 2 October 1771, the third son and tenth child of Robert Plumptre, president of Queens' College, and his wife, Anne Newcome. His elder sisters Anne Plumptre and Annabella Plumptre were both writers.

He attended Newcome's School in Hackney, where he participated in amateur theatrical productions and developed an interest in drama. He entered Queens' College in 1788, matriculated in 1789 and transferred to Clare Hall in December 1790. He graduated B.A. in 1792, M.A. in 1795 and B.D. in 1808, and was elected a fellow of Clare in 1794. He was ordained deacon in 1794 and priest in 1796.

Plumptre became involved in literary and theatrical circles in Enfield and Norwich. In 1791, he acted in Amelia Alderson's play Adelaide and wrote its prologue. His comedy The Coventry Act was performed privately in Norwich in 1792 by Plumptre, his sisters and their friends, before being staged professionally at the Norwich Theatre Royal and published in 1793. He subsequently wrote the tragedy Osway (1795) and the comic opera The Lakers (1798).

Plumptre regarded drama as a means of moral instruction and sought to make theatrical performances compatible with Christian morality. His writings on the subject included Four Discourses on Subjects Relating to the Amusement of the Stage (1809) and The English Drama Purified (1812), a three-volume collection of plays from which he had removed or altered passages he considered objectionable.

Between 1790 and 1800, Plumptre undertook eight tours through England, Scotland and Wales, recording his observations in travel journals. His journey in 1799 lasted four and a half months and covered 2,236 miles, much of it on foot. He prepared a three-volume account for publication, but it remained unpublished during his lifetime. Selections from his journals were edited by Ian Ousby and published in 1992 as James Plumptre's Britain: The Journals of a Tourist in the 1790s.

From 1797 to 1805, Plumptre was responsible for the parish of Hinxton, formally as sequestrator and effectively as curate in charge. Working with Edward Green, a local landowner, he established a friendly society, promoted Edward Jenner's smallpox vaccine and organised gardening competitions. Following Green's death in 1805, Plumptre returned to Cambridge. In May 1812, he became vicar of Great Gransden, Huntingdonshire, where he remained until his death.

Plumptre married Elizabeth Robinson in Cambridge on 6 June 1815. He died at Great Gransden on 23 January 1832 and was buried in the chancel of St Bartholomew's Church. Elizabeth continued living at Great Gransden until her death in 1836. Plumptre's remains were later moved to a grave beside hers, outside the church wall.

== Animal protection and theology ==
Frontispiece to Plumptre's The Experienced Butcher (1816)

Plumptre was among the English clergymen who addressed human obligations towards animals in sermons during the late eighteenth century. On 8 May 1796, he preached "The Duties of Man to the Brute Creation" before the University of Cambridge, with Prince William of Gloucester among the congregation. Drawing extensively on biblical texts, Plumptre argued that humans had religious duties towards animals. He cited the biblical requirement that cattle, as well as people, should rest on the Sabbath, describing the use of horses on Sundays as a "national sin".

The sermon was poorly received. Plumptre later recalled that many listeners had regarded the treatment of animals as a trivial subject, unsuitable for a university pulpit. He attributed his decision to preach on the subject to repeated readings of William Cowper's poem The Task. Literary scholar David Perkins discusses the sermon alongside those of James Granger and Humphry Primatt in his account of eighteenth-century religious arguments concerning the treatment of animals.

Plumptre's travel journals also document changes in his attitude towards animals. In 1790, he participated in hare coursing, but by 1800 he expressed regret about birds he had previously shot and had abandoned blood sports. Ousby relates this change to Plumptre's reading of Cowper and James Thomson, as well as the Evangelical movement's campaign for moral reform.

In 1816, Plumptre published his 1796 sermon together with two further sermons in Three Discourses on the Case of the Animal Creation, and the Duties of Man to Them. In the preface, he observed that public concern about the treatment of animals had increased since the original sermon.

That year, he also published The Experienced Butcher, which discussed the butcher's trade, including the religious considerations of slaughter, relevant laws and practical advice for butchers. His advocacy of humane treatment did not extend to opposition to killing animals for food. Ousby notes that Plumptre addressed arguments for vegetarianism advanced by Joseph Ritson and others in The Experienced Butcher and Three Discourses.

Plumptre also gave the Association for Promoting Rational Humanity towards the Animal Creation a manuscript titled The Natural History of the Cat, intended to be sold to raise funds for the organisation. The Association's prospectus of 1836 listed the manuscript as still unsold.

== Works ==
Plumptre's publications included:

- The Coventry Act: A Comedy (1793)
- Osway: A Tragedy (1795)
- Observations on Hamlet (1796)
- The Lakers: A Comic Opera (1798)
- A Collection of Songs, Moral, Sentimental, Instructive, and Amusing (1805)
- The Plague Stayed (1805)
- Four Discourses on Subjects Relating to the Amusement of the Stage (1809)
- The Vocal Repository (from 1809)
- An Inquiry into the Lawfulness of the Stage (1812)
- The English Drama Purified, 3 vols. (1812)
- The Experienced Butcher (1816)
- Three Discourses on the Case of the Animal Creation, and the Duties of Man to Them (1816)
- Original Dramas (1818)
- A Selection from Fables by John Gay (1823)
- Fables in Verse for the Female Sex (1825)
- One Hundred Fables in Verse, by Various Authors (1825)
- Robinson Crusoe, revised and corrected by Plumptre (1826)
- A Popular Commentary on the Bible, 2 vols. (1827)

== Papers ==
Plumptre's papers are held by Cambridge University Library. The collection includes drafts of plays, travel journals, diaries, correspondence, notes on Great Gransden and other manuscripts. The library also holds a separate manuscript of his 1825 bowdlerised version of the Chester Mystery Plays.

== See also ==
- Christianity and animal rights
- History of animal rights
