= Herbert Palmer (Puritan) =

English Puritan clergyman

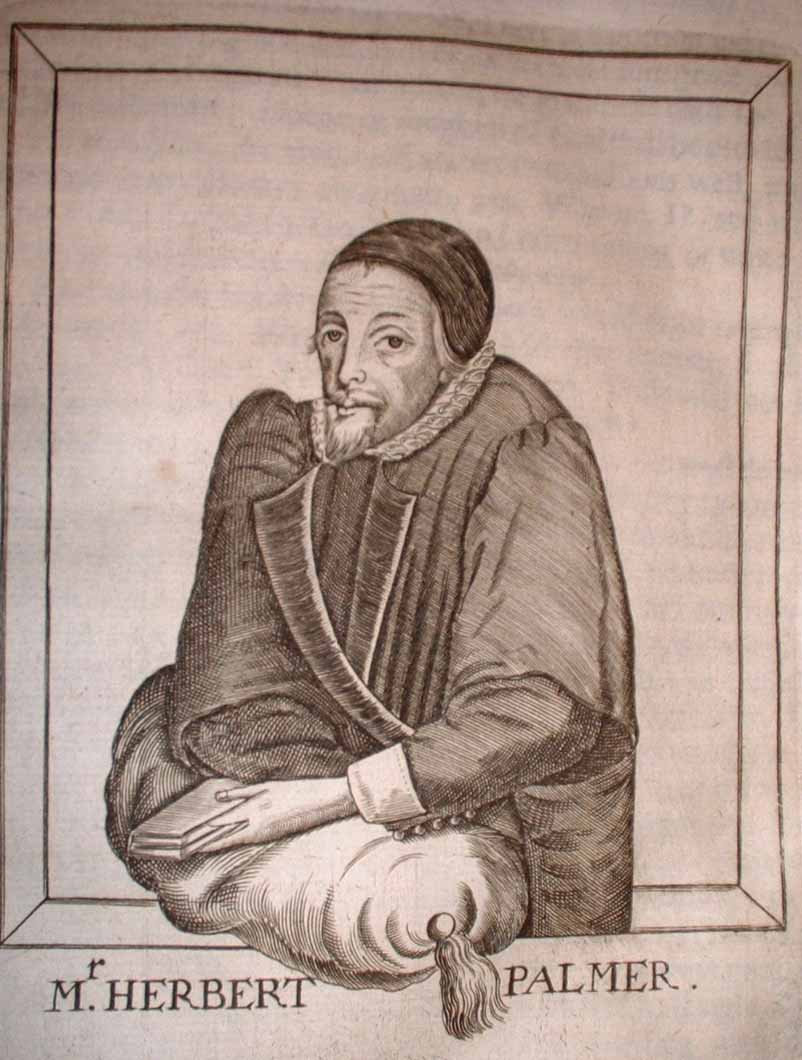
Herbert Palmer

Herbert Palmer (1601–1647) was an English Puritan clergyman, member of the Westminster Assembly, and President of Queens' College, Cambridge. He is now remembered for his work on the Westminster Shorter Catechism, and as a leading opponent of John Milton's divorce tracts.

== Early life ==
He was a younger son of Sir Thomas Palmer, knt. (d. 1625), and grandson of Sir Thomas Palmer (1540–1626) of Wingham, Kent. He was born at Wingham in 1601, and baptised on 29 March. His mother was the eldest daughter of Herbert Pelham of Crawley, Sussex. He learnt French almost as soon as English, and always spoke it fluently.

On 23 March 1616, he was admitted fellow-commoner in St. John's College, Cambridge; he graduated B.A. 1619, M.A. 1622, and was elected fellow of Queens' College, Cambridge on 17 July 1623. He took holy orders in 1624, and proceeded B.D. in 1631. In 1626, on his way to visit his brother, Sir Thomas Palmer, Bart. (d. 1666), at Wingham, he preached at Canterbury Cathedral. The report of his sermon reached the ears of Philip Delme, minister of the French church at Canterbury, who made his acquaintance at Wingham, got him to preach again at St. George's, Canterbury, and made efforts to procure his settlement as lecturer. He was licensed by Archbishop George Abbot for a Sunday afternoon lectureship at St. Alphage's, Canterbury. He acted as a spiritual adviser, and did much religious visiting, though without pastoral charge. Occasionally he preached to the French congregation.

== Political career ==
While strongly opposing the separatist party, he resisted the innovations favoured by William Laud. He was articled for his puritanism, but the prosecution proved abortive. About 1630 the dean, Isaac Bargrave, put down his lectureship, on the ground that he had gone beyond his office by catechising and that his lecture drew 'factious persons' out of other parishes; the lecture was revived in consequence of an influentially signed petition to Abbot. His friends, headed by Thomas Finch, twice tried without success to secure for him a prebend at Canterbury.

On the resignation of Thomas Turner, Laud, then Bishop of London, presented Palmer, at the instance of 'a great nobleman' to the rectory of Ashwell, Hertfordshire, in 1632. Laud, at his trial a decade later, referred to this among other evidences of his impartial patronage of merit; he declined the religious ministrations of Palmer during his imprisonment in the Tower and at the block. In 1632 also, Palmer was made university preacher at Cambridge. At Ashwell he matured his system of catechising, giving prizes of bibles to those who could read, and 5s. to illiterates, on their reaching a proficiency which fitted them for admission to communion. Robert Baillie reckoned Palmer 'the best catechist in England.' He originated the method of breaking up the main answer into preparatory questions, to be answered by 'yes' or 'no.' In 1633 he refused to read the Book of Sports. He got his parishioners to bind themselves against compact against drunkenness and sabbath-breaking. He took in sons of noblemen and gentry as boarders, under a resident tutor. Preaching a visitation sermon at Hitchin in 1638, he spoke freely against 'innovations'.

On 19 July 1642 he was appointed by the House of Commons one of fifteen Tuesday lecturers at Hitchin; and then was appointed an original member of the Westminster Assembly by the ordinance of 12 June 1643. He moved to London, placing Ashwell in charge of John Crow, his half-brother, who became his successor (28 September 1647), and was ejected in 1662. On 28 June 1643 he preached a political sermon before the House of Commons, whose thanks he received through Sir Oliver Luke. He became preacher at St. James's, Duke Place, and afterwards at the 'new church' in the parish of St. Margaret's, Westminster (represented since 1843 by Christ Church, Westminster). He was also one of the seven morning lecturers at Westminster Abbey. On 11 April 1644 he was appointed by Edward Montagu, 2nd Earl of Manchester as Master of Queens' College, Cambridge, in place of Edward Martin. At the same time the entire fellowship of the college, strongly royalist, was expelled: Martin was already in the Tower of London. Manchester recruited nine new Fellows, seven being from Emmanuel College, Cambridge. In his capacity as President Palmer was a disciplinarian, helped refugee students from Germany and Hungary, and gave benefactions to the college library.

In the Westminster Assembly, of which he was one of the assessors pro tempore in January 1646 and September 1646, he had much to do with the drawing up of the 'directory,' and was anxious for a clause about pastoral visitation, which was not inserted. As regards ordination, he differed both from presbyterians and independents, holding (with Richard Baxter) that any company of ministers may ordain, and that designation to a congregation is unnecessary. He joined John Lightfoot in pleading for private baptism. His chief work was in connection with the assembly's Shorter Catechism, though he did not live till its completion. To him was due the method by which each answer forms a substantive statement, not needing to be helped out by the question.

He died in August or September 1647; he was unmarried. A portrait, in Samuel Clarke's Lives of Thirty-two English Divines (1677) shows an emaciated visage, sunk between his shoulders; he wears moustache and thin beard, skull-cap and ruff with academic gown, and leans on a cushion. Symon Patrick, a friend at college, calls him "a little crooked man", but says he was revered. He left a benefaction for poor scholars at Queens' College.

== Works ==
Since a book by Alexander Grosart in the nineteenth century, a work on the "Christian Paradoxes" has usually been attributed to Palmer; formerly it was considered to be by Francis Bacon. It was printed in 1645 as The Characters of a believing Christian, in Paradoxes and seeming Contradictions. Also from 1645 is a sabbatarian work with Daniel Cawdry.

- Lord Bacon not the author of "The Christian paradoxes
  - https://archive.org/details/lordbaconnotauth00palmer
  - https://archive.org/details/lordbaconnotauth00palm OL 6621071M LCCN 19-26018 LCC BV4500 .P3 1865
  - https://archive.org/details/lordbaconnotauth00palmiala OL 7169599M
  - https://archive.org/details/ldbaconnotauthor00palmiala OL 7044907M LCCN 20-13257 LCC BV4500 .P3 1864
  - (1865) https://archive.org/details/lordbacon00palmuoft OL 7237141M

== Notes ==
Academic offices
Preceded by Edward Martin	President of Queens' College, Cambridge; 1649–1652	Succeeded by Thomas Horton
