= Andrew Dokett =

English churchman and academic (died 1484)

Andrew Duckett (died 4 November 1484) was an English churchman and academic, who became the first President of Queens' College, Cambridge.

== Life ==
He was principal and owner of St. Bernard's Hostel, of which he may have been the founder.

== Career in the church ==
Before 1439 he was presented by Corpus Christi College to the vicarage of St Botolph's Church, Cambridge, of which, on the restoration of the great tithes, he became rector 21 October 1444. He resigned the rectory in 1470. Subsequently, he was made one of the canons or prebendaries of the royal chapel of St Stephen's, Westminster, a preferment he exchanged in 1479 with Dr Walter Oudeby for the provostship of the collegiate church of Cotterstock, near Oundle. In July 1467 Duckett was collated to the prebend of Ryton in Lichfield Cathedral, which he exchanged for the chancellorship of Lichfield in 1470, an office which he resigned 6 July 1476.

== College head ==
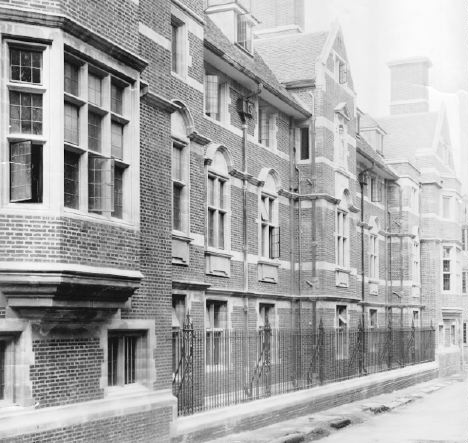
Newly built Dokett Building, in 1912.

The major work of Duckett's life was the foundation of the college. By prudent administration and adroitness in securing the patronage of the sovereigns, he developed it from small beginnings into a well-endowed society, Queens' College, Cambridge. The foundation of King's College by Henry VI took place in 1440. In December 1446 Duckett obtained a royal charter for a college, to consist of a president and four fellows. Eight months later, Duckett having in the meanwhile obtained a better site for his proposed buildings, this charter was cancelled at his own request, and a second issued by the king 21 August 1447, authorising the refoundation of the college on the new site, under the name of ‘the College of St. Bernard of Cambridge.’ Duckett secured the protection of the young Queen Margaret of Anjou for his college, which was refounded by her as ‘the Queen's College of St. Margaret and St. Bernard.’ Henry VI granted £200 to it, and the names of some of the Queen's court appear on the roll of benefactors.

The foundation-stone was laid for the Queen by Sir John Wenlock, her chamberlain, on 15 April 1448, and the quadrangle was approaching completion when the outbreak of the Wars of the Roses put a temporary stop to the undertaking. Later Duckett became a Yorkist, and persuaded the new Queen Elizabeth Woodville to support the college. The prosperity of the college was due to her influence with her husband, and she gave it the first statutes in 1475; the college was henceforth known as ‘Queens' College,’ in the plural.

Duckett also succeeded in ingratiating himself with the King's brother, Richard, and obtained his patronage. As Duke of Gloucester, Richard founded four fellowships, and as King Richard III increased the emoluments of the college by grants of lands belonging (in right of her mother) to his Queen Anne, who had accepted the position of foundress and patroness of this college. These estates were, however, lost to the college on the accession of Henry VII.

The endowments were also augmented by Duckett's offer to place the names of deceased persons on the bede-roll of the college in return for a gift of money.

== Death and legacy ==
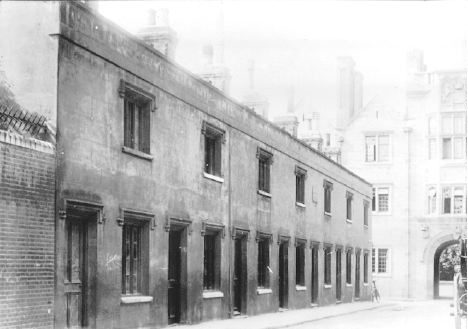
The almshouses on Queens' Lane, Cambridge, which were maintained by his benefaction to the college

Duckett governed his college for 38 years, having lived long enough to see a foundation of four fellows grow into a society of 17. He died 4 November 1484. His will, dated 2 November of that year, was printed by William George Searle in his history of the college. He was buried in the choir of his college chapel, ‘where the lessons are read.’ His gravestone with the matrix of his incised effigy existed in William Cole's time (c. 1777), but has now disappeared.

== Works ==
He made a catalogue of the library of his college, consisting of 299 volumes, in 1472, and also an inventory of the chapel furniture in the same year.

== Notes ==
Attribution

This article incorporates text from a publication now in the public domain: Stephen, Leslie, ed. (1888). "Doket, Andrew". Dictionary of National Biography. Vol. 15. London: Smith, Elder & Co.
