= Anne Plumptre =

English writer and translator (1760–1818)

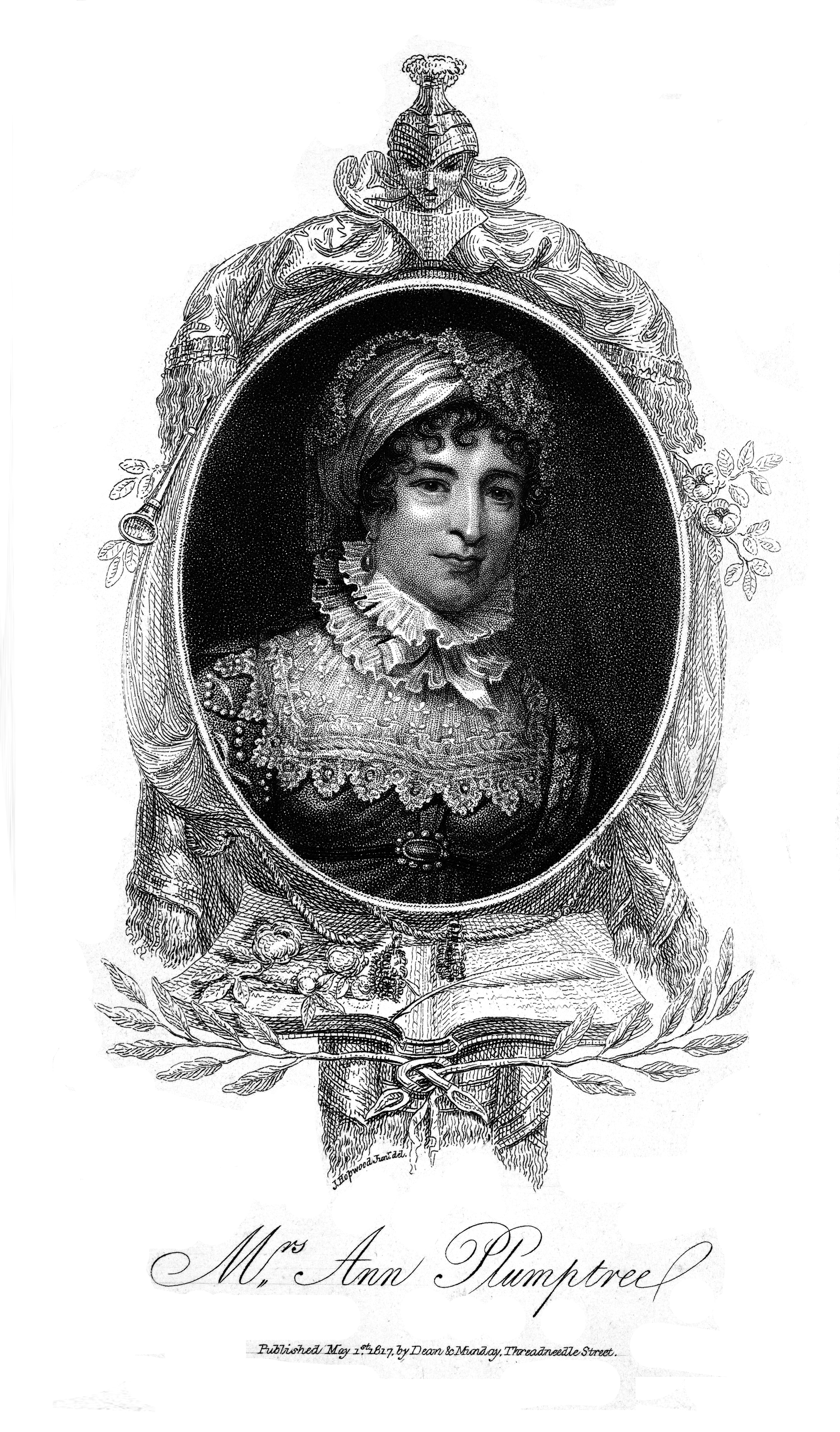
Portrait, 1817

Anne Plumptre (22 February 1760 – 20 October 1818) was an English writer and translator sometimes collaborating with her sister Annabella Plumptre. She translated several German works into English.

== Life ==
Anne was born in Norwich. She was the second daughter of Robert Plumptre who became President of Queens' College, Cambridge and Anne née Newcome. Along with her younger sister Annabella [Bell] Plumptre (1769–1838) she received an excellent education and became active in the Enfield circle, a local group of literati. Her brother James Plumptre was known as a dramatist. Later she became involved in politics during the period of the French Revolution. She published her own fiction, travel writing and political enquiry, as well as many translations of letters, travel writing, drama, and other genres.

She was well educated in French, Italian, Spanish and especially German. She began writing articles in periodicals. The freethinking Alexander Geddes encouraged her. Her first book, a novel in two volumes, entitled Antoinette, was published anonymously, but was acknowledged in a second edition.

Anne was one of the first to make German plays known in London, and in 1798 and 1799 translated many of the dramas of Kotzebue, following up this work with a Life and Literary Career of Kotzebue, translated from the German and published in 1801. From 1802 to 1805 she resided in France, and published her experiences in 1810 in the Narrative of a Three Years’ Residence in France (3 vols.) Lucy Brightwell states that she accompanied John Opie and Amelia Opie to Paris in August 1802. She became well known as a supporter of Napoleon; in 1810 she declared that she would welcome him if he invaded England, because he would do away with the aristocracy and give the country a better government.

In 1814–15 she visited Ireland, and recorded her experiences in the Narrative of a Residence in Ireland, published in 1817. It was ridiculed by John Wilson Croker in the Quarterly Review. Her other contributions to literature consist mainly of translations of travels from the French and German. Helen Maria Williams, the poet, was a close friend. She died in Norwich on 20 October 1818, at the age of 58, after a "productive and for the most part successful literary career" (Shaffer).
