= Thomas Pecocke =

Thomas Peacock (also Pecocke) (died in or after 1581) was an English cleric and college head.

== Life ==
Peacock was born at Cambridge, about 1516, the son of Thomas Peacock, a burgess of Cambridge. He was admitted a fellow of St John's College, Cambridge, in 1534, and graduated B.A. 1534–5, M.A. 1537, and B.D. 1554.

Peacock's religious views were Roman Catholic; and during the disturbances in St John's College leading to the visitation by Thomas Goodrich, Bishop of Ely, on 5 April 1542, Peacock was one of the "appellants" opposed to John Taylor. On 1 April 1555 he signed the Roman Catholic articles promoted by Dr. Atkynson and others, and on 25 October Thomas Thirlby, Bishop of Ely, whose chaplain he was, presented him to the rectory of Downham, Cambridgeshire.

On the occasion of Cardinal Pole's visitation of the university (11 January 1556–7) Peacock preached in Latin before the visitors in St Mary's Church, against heresy. On 31 January 1558 he was presented by the bishop of Ely to the rectory of Barley, Hertfordshire; and on 23 November of the same year was elected President of Queens' College, Cambridge.

Refusing to comply with the religious changes at the accession of Elizabeth I, Peacock lost all his preferments. He resigned the presidency of Queens' College on 1 July 1559, in order to avoid expulsion.

== Notes ==
Attribution

This article incorporates text from a publication now in the public domain: Lee, Sidney, ed. (1895). "Peacock, Thomas (1516?-1582?)". Dictionary of National Biography. Vol. 44. London: Smith, Elder & Co.
