= Francis Prujean =

English physician

Sir Francis Prujean (also Pridgeon) M.D. (1593–1666) was an English physician.

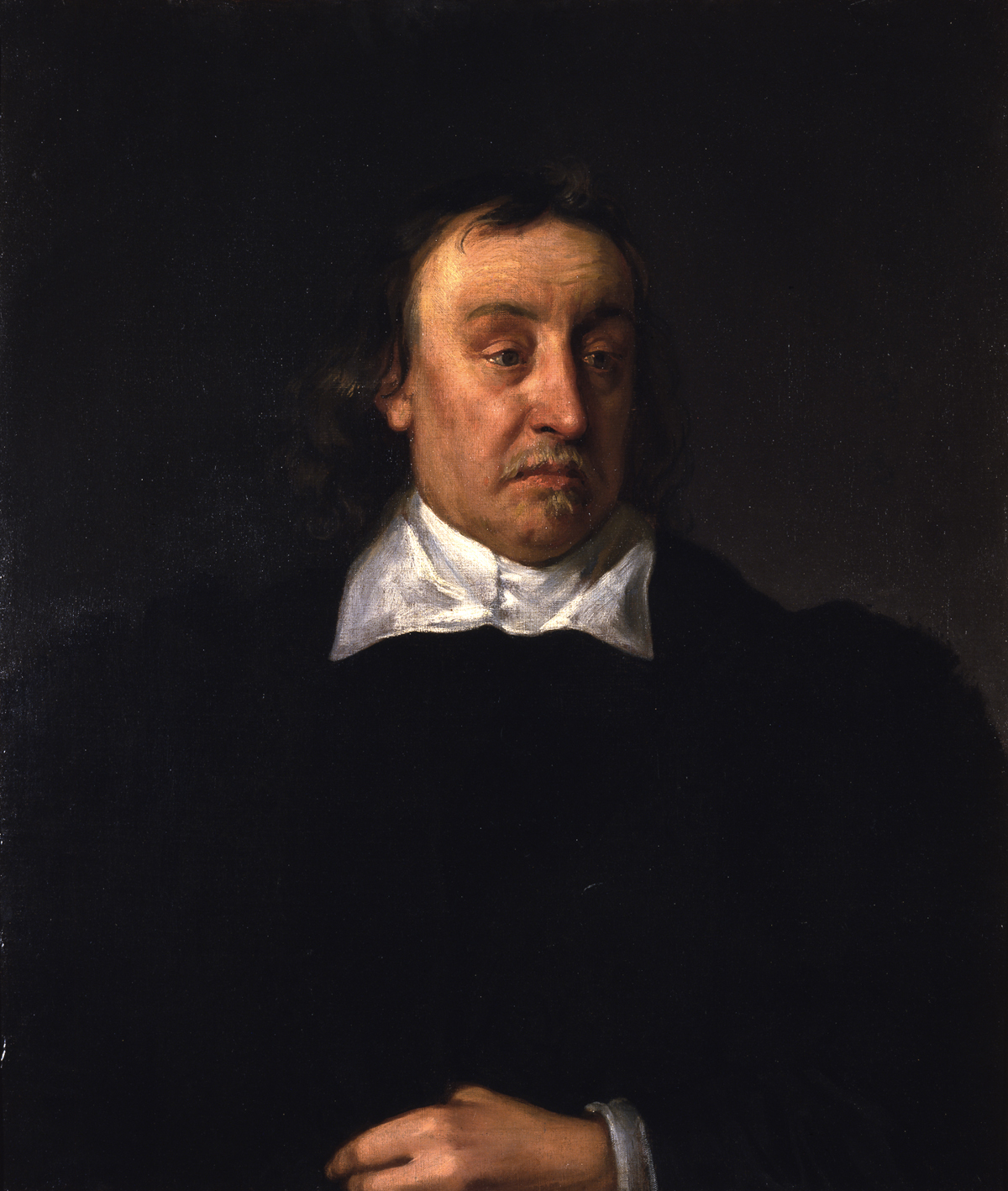
Francis Prujean, portrait by Robert Streater

== Life ==
The son of Francis Prujean, rector of Boothby, Lincolnshire, (Note: There are at least two places in Lincolnshire named Boothby: Boothby Graffoe and Boothby Pagnell. The current sources do not provide enough information to determine which one is meant.) he was born at Bury St Edmunds, and educated by his father. He entered Caius College, Cambridge as a sizar, on 23 March 1610, and graduated M.B. in 1617, and M.D. in 1625. He became a licentiate of the College of Physicians of London on 22 December 1621, and was elected a fellow in 1626.

Prujean practised in Lincolnshire till 1638, and then settled in London. In 1639 he was elected a censor at the College of Physicians, and again from 1642 to 1647. He was registrar from 1641 to 1647, and president from 1650 to 1654, in the last of which years he was chosen, on the recommendation of William Harvey who declined the post. He was treasurer from 1655 to 1663.

Prujean had a large practice, and was knighted by Charles II on 1 April 1661. When Queen Catherine of Braganza had typhus fever in October 1663, he attended her, and her recovery was attributed to a cordial he prescribed. John Evelyn described his laboratory and collection of pictures, and mentions that he played on the "polythore", a musical instrument combining features of the harp, lute and theorbo. Prujean also had some dealings with patients who were considered mad or of "weak understanding". Rochester Carre of Lincolnshire, the younger brother of Sir Robert Carre baronet of Aswarby, who was declared a lunatic in 1637, lived with him under treatment for upwards of twenty years and he also dealt with Sir Robert himself when his mental state was questioned by Parliament in 1646.

Prujean died on 23 June 1666, and was buried at Hornchurch in Essex. Baldwin Hamey the younger composed a Latin epitaph. Prujean lived near the Old Bailey, and the place was named Prujean Square after him. Samuel Pepys called him a man of great judgment but who sadly left no written works behind him.

== Family ==
Prujean was married twice: first to Margaret Leggatt (died 1661), and secondly, on 13 February 1664, to Margaret, the widow of Sir Thomas Fleming, and daughter of Edward Gorges, 1st Baron Gorges of Dundalk. Samuel Pepys records that his second wife brought him a great fortune. By his first wife, he had an only son, Thomas Prujean, who graduated M.D. at Cambridge in 1649.
