= Annabella Plumptre =

English writer and translator (1769–1838)

- Born: 1769; Norwich
- Died: 1838 (aged 68–69)
- Other name: Bell Plumptre

Annabella "Bell" Plumptre (1769–1838) was an English writer and translator. She sometimes collaborated with her sister Anne Plumptre.

== Life ==
Plumptre was born in Norwich in 1769. Her father was Robert Plumptre and her siblings were the cleric James Plumptre and fellow writer Anne Plumptre. She and Anna were given a good education which included foreign languages. They wrote as part of what became known as the "Enfield Group". A friend was the writer Amelia Opie (then Alderson) who wrote a play, Adelaide, that they both acted in when it was performed privately. Their brother James wrote the prologue. The two sisters began to translate plays from German including those of the playwright August von Kotzebue.

Plumptre was known for her writings associated with the politics of food production. She published work between 1794 and 1818. In 1810 she published a cookery book to which was associated her thoughts on food, diet and politics. She argued against the use of food production as an economic tool.
