= Joshua King (mathematician) =

English mathematician (1798–1857)

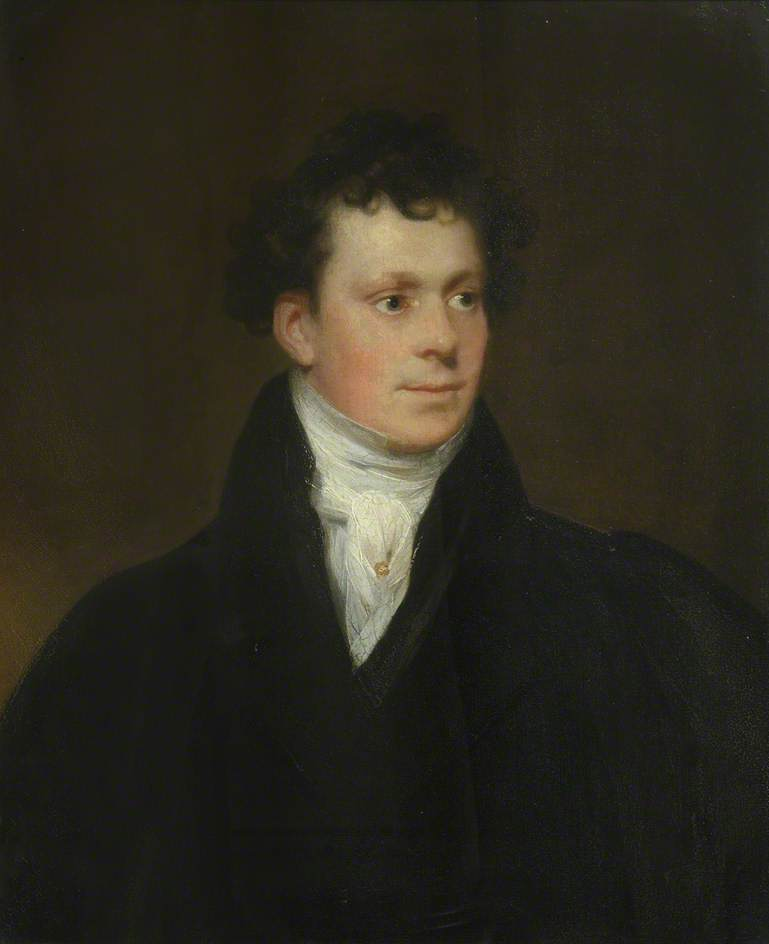
- Joshua King by William Beechey
- Born: 16 January 1798; Lowick, Ulverston, Lancashire, England
- Died: 1 September 1857 (aged 59); President's Lodge, Queens' College, Cambridge, England
- Education: Queens' College, Cambridge
- Awards: Smith's Prize (1819); Senior Wrangler; Lucasian Professor of Mathematics
- Scientific career
- Workplaces: University of Cambridge

Joshua King (16 January 1798 – 1 September 1857) was the Lucasian Professor of Mathematics at the University of Cambridge from 1839 to 1849. He was also the President of Queens' College, Cambridge, from 1832 until his death and Vice-Chancellor of Cambridge University from 1833 to 1834.

== Education ==
Educated at Hawkshead Grammar School, Joshua King went first to Trinity College, Cambridge in 1815 but moved to Queens' College in February 1816 as a sizar (i.e. a student receiving some financial assistance), and graduated Senior Wrangler in 1819.

== Career ==
He was elected a Fellow of the Queens’ in 1820, and served as its president from 1832 to his death – the first person not in holy orders to be so elected. In the university, he was Lucasian Professor of Mathematics from 1839, resigning because of ill-health in 1849 having given no lectures and published only one paper. His interests seemingly shifted from mathematics to law and politics, although he declined to stand as Tory candidate for Parliament for either the town or the university. He served on many committees, and was Vice-Chancellor in 1833/34. He died on 1 September 1857 aged 59, and was buried in the antechapel of the college.

"Joshua King came to Cambridge from Hawkshead Grammar School. It was soon evident that the school had produced someone of importance. He became Senior Wrangler, and his reputation in Cambridge was immense. It was believed that nothing less than a second Newton had appeared. They expected his work as a mathematician to make an epoch in the science. At an early age he became president of Queens’; later, he was Lucasian Professor. He published nothing; in fact, he did no mathematical work. But as long as he kept his health, he was an active and prominent figure in Cambridge, and he maintained his enormous reputation. When he died, it was felt that the memory of such an extraordinary man should not be permitted to die out, and his papers should be published. So his papers were examined, and nothing whatever worth publishing was found."

Academic offices
Preceded by Henry Godfrey	President of Queens' College, Cambridge; 1832–1857	Succeeded by George Phillips
