= Motherhood studies =

Motherhood studies is a recognized field of study coined by Dr. Andrea O'Reilly. It is related to maternal feminism.

== Definition ==
The idea of motherhood studies was influenced by Adrienne Rich’s Of Woman Born: Motherhood as Experience and Institution in 1976. It consists of three interconnected categories of inquiry: motherhood as institution, motherhood as experience, and motherhood as identity or subjectivity. Motherhood studies is often referred to as a feminist practice. Feminist mothering critiques the sexist and patriarchal values that contemporary society upholds. Part of feminist mothering is maternal activism. Feminist mothering also involves mothers reinventing or reconstructing their own mothering practice to minimize inequality in the domestic division of labor, to increase their autonomy, leisure, waged work as well as paid and unpaid leave. Like maternal feminism, feminist mothering also involves a feminist politics of birth, breastfeeding and embodied attachment to children. It is the extension of an ethic of care to children and beyond that to society.

== History ==
Samira Kawash argues that "the marginalization of motherhood in feminist thought was not only a political rejection of maternalist politics construed as a conservative backlash to feminism".

One of the leading portals of mother studies is The m/other voices foundation, a non-profit organization in The Netherlands. It emerged in 2014 from Deirdre M. Donoghue's research project (m)other voices: the maternal as an attitude, maternal thinking and the production of time and knowledge at Witte de With Centre for Contemporary Art. The project's purpose was to initiate discourse and the doing of maternal theory within arts and other fields of cultural production and to reflect on the maternal figure as a thinker and a producer of knowledge.

More and more organized initiatives within academic communities are starting such as the Motherhood Initiative for Research and Community Involvement, a feminist scholarly and activist organization on mothering-motherhood based in Toronto, Canada.

The Journal of the Motherhood Initiative re-launched in 2010 as a continuation of the Journal of the Association for Research on Mothering that started in 1999.

== Key texts ==
- Bueskens, Petra. "Modern Motherhood and Women's Dual Identities: Rewriting the Sexual Contract". Routledge, 2018.
- Kinser, Amber, ed. Mothering in the Third Wave. Toronto: Demeter Press, 2008.
- Rich, Adrienne. Of Woman Born: Motherhood as Experience and Institution, 1976.
- Ross Haller Baggesen, Lise. Mothernism.
- Umansky, Laurie. Motherhood Re- conceived, 1996.
- Hays, Sharon. The Cultural Contradictions of Motherhood, 1996.
- Krishnaraj, Maithreyi (ed).Motherhood in India : Glorification without Empowerment. UK: Routledge, 2010.
- Mitra, Zinia.(ed). The Concept of Motherhood in India :Myths Theories and Realities. U.K: Cambridge Scholars Publishing, 2020.

== See also ==
- International Association of Maternal Action + Scholarship
- Museum of Motherhood
- Manifesto for Maintenance Art, 1969
- Mary Kelly
- Maternal Feminism
