= List of feminist rhetoricians =

This is a list of the major works of feminist women who have made considerable contributions to and shaped the rhetorical discourse about women. It is the table of contents of Available Means: An Anthology of Women's Rhetoric(s), edited by Joy Ritchie and Kate Ronald and published by University of Pittsburgh Press (2001).

== Aspasia ==
(c. 469 – c. 406 BCE) Aspasia was the mistress of the statesman Pericles, and after he divorced his wife (this may or may not be true) they lived together as if they were married. Their home was a communal meeting place for a wide variety of people. It was a place of conversation and culture which people from all over contributed to rhetoric. Aspasia's writings do not remain, but she is mentioned by writers such as Plato in regard to her contributions to rhetoric. She also said to have taught other women how to carry themselves and speak to groups of people intelligently. Aspasia was a great rhetor and was said to have written the famous speech given at Pericles' funeral.

Aspasia's rhetoric and social contributions were seen through a gendered lens.

- Plato's Menexenus

== Diotima ==
Socrates references Diotima in Plato's Symposium, as a seer or priestess who taught him "the philosophy of eros" when he was young. It is not known whether she was a real person, or a character he developed.

- Plato's Symposium (c. 360 BCE)

== Hortensia ==
- "Letter I. Heloise to Abelard" (1132)

== St. Catherine of Siena ==
(1347–1380) St. Catherine of Siena was the daughter of a poet and had no formal education. She devoted her life to Christ, and wrote hundreds of letters to individuals in authority and to the Pope. Over three hundred of these letters still exist and are viewed as a major work of early Tuscan literature.

- "Letter 83: To Mona Lapa, her mother, in Siena" (1376)

== Christine de Pizan ==
(1364–1430) Christine de Pizan had a writing career that spanned approximately thirty years. During that time, she wrote numerous pieces (41 known works) and was considered as Europe's first professional writer. She is seen as a feminist who challenged the misogyny of male writers.

- The Book of the City of Ladies (1404)

== Laura Cereta ==
(1469–1499) Laura Cereta's main writing consisted of letters to other scholars. She believed in women's right to education and fought against the oppression marriage brought to women.

- "Letter to Bibulus, Sempronius, Defense of the Liberal Instruction of Women" (1488)

== Margery Kempe ==
(c. 1373–after 1438) Margery Kempe's book, possibly the first autobiography in English, gives readers a glimpse of a woman's life in the Middle Ages.

- The Book of Margery Kempe (1436)

== Margaret Fell ==
(1614–1702) Margaret Fell was one of the founding members of the Religious Society of Friends. The meetings held by the Society were frequently held in her home and, as an educated individual, she wrote many of the epistle. She remained an active Quaker throughout her life.

- Womens Speaking Justified, Proved and Allowed by the Scriptures (1666)

== Sor Juana Ines de la Cruz ==
(1651–1695) There is question on the year of Sor Juana Ines de la Cruz's birth, but no one questions that she was a self-taught Mexican scholar and writer who lived in a viceroy's court until entering the convent to become a nun in 1668. Her writing focused on freedom in regard to race and gender.

- "La Respuesta a sor Filotea de la Cruz" ("Reply to the Most Illustrious Sister Filotea de la Cruz") (1691)

== Mary Astell ==
(1666–1731) Mary Astell was an advocate of equal educational opportunities for women. She was educated informally by her uncle, who had been suspended by the church.

- A Serious Proposal to the Ladies (1694)

== Mary Wollstonecraft ==
(1759–1797) Mary Wollstonecraft had a short lived, but important writing career. It lasted only nine years, but covered a wide span of genres and topics. She is recognized for her early advocacy of women's rights.

- A Vindication of the Rights of Woman (1792)

== Maria W. Stewart ==
(1803–1897) Orphaned early, Maria W. Stewart was a servant in a minister's home and received her education there. Due to the religious nature of her education, many of her speeches and written work held deeply religious tones. She was known as a women's rights advocate that spoke to African-American women about rights and social justice.

- "Lecture Delivered at the Franklin Hall" (1832)

== Sarah Grimke ==
(1792–1873) Sarah Grimke was the southern born daughter of a planter. She was self-educated, and became an attorney and a judge in South Carolina, US. Her belief in education brought her to teach her personal slave how to read, contrary to the laws of the time. After becoming a Quaker, she fought for women's rights and against slavery.

- "An Epistle to the Clergy of the Southern States" (1836)
- "Letters on the Equality of the Sexes and the Condition of Women" (1838)

== Margaret Fuller ==
(1810–1850) Margaret Fuller was an editor, critic, journalist, and women's rights activist. She was active in the field of journalism all of her life, and held discussion groups for women regarding arts, education, and other issues deemed important to women.

- Woman in the Nineteenth Century (1845)

== Sojourner Truth ==
(c. 1797–1883) A slave and then a domestic servant, Sojourner Truth was a noted activist in regard to abolition and women's rights. She is best known for her speech "Ain't I a Woman".

- "Speech at the Woman's Rights Convention, Akron, Ohio" (1851)

== Frances Ellen Watkins Harper ==
(1825–1911) Frances Ellen Watkins Harper was an African American born to free parents. Her education came about while she was a servant in a Quaker household and given access to the family's library. She was known as a writer (both books and poetry), lecturer, and political activist. She held office in several organizations that promoted abolition, civil rights, and women's rights.

- "We Are All Bound Up Together" (1866)

== Susan B. Anthony ==
(1820–1906) Susan B. Anthony, the daughter of a Quaker, was well educated. She was a teacher and activist who worked tirelessly in regard to abolition, temperance, and women's rights. Anthony traveled extensively with Elizabeth Cady Stanton promoting women's rights and equality.

- The United States of America v. Susan B. Anthony (1873)

== Sarah Winnemucca ==
(c. 1841–1891) Sarah Winnemucca was a Paiute who wrote an autobiographical account of her people's early experiences with white settlers and the government. She is the first Native American woman to copyright and publish a text in English. The book is considered controversial and some members of her tribe saw her as selling out to the white man. She became a noted speaker and activist.

- Life Among the Piutes (1883)

== Anna Julia Cooper ==
(1858–1964) Anna Julia Cooper was born into slavery, but had no memory of it. She taught until she married when she was forced to leave her post temporarily, until his death two years after their marriage. Her book about Southern black woman was considered the first feminist work by an African-American woman.

- "The Higher Education of Women" (1892)
- A Voice from the South by a Black Woman of the South

== Elizabeth Cady Stanton ==
(1815–1902) Elizabeth Cady Stanton was an activist in the anti-slavery movement and one of the leading figures of the early women's rights movement. She was friends with both Susan B. Anthony and Frederick Douglass, a former slave, abolitionist, and noted author.

- "The Solitude of Self" (1892)

== Fannie Barrier Williams ==
(1855–1944) Fannie Barrier Williams was an African-American educator and political activist.

- "The Intellectual Progress of Colored Women of the United States since the Emancipation Proclamation" (1893)

== Ida B. Wells ==
(1862–1931) Ida B. Wells (also known as Ida Wells-Barnett) was an African-American woman who was a journalist and public speaker. She adamantly stood against lynching and worked for women's suffrage and rights.

- "Lynch Law in All its Phases" (1893)

== Charlotte Perkins Gilman ==
(1860–1935) Charlotte Perkins Gilman was a prominent American short story writer, novelist, lecturer, and feminist activist. She wrote the short story "The Yellow Wallpaper", which addresses mental illness in women and its treatment. It is the story she is most recognized for today.

- Women and Economics (1898)

== Gertrude Buck ==
(1871–1922) Gertrude Buck was born on July 14, 1871, in Michigan where she lived for the first half of her life. She was among a new generation of privileged white women who were able to attend college. Buck received three degrees from the University of Michigan, her bachelor’s at age 13, master’s at age 24, and doctorate in rhetoric at age 27. After receiving her doctorate, Buck went on to teach English and Rhetoric at Vassar College in New York for about 25 years. While there, she was active not only in teaching, but in administration duties and community social issues as well.

She lived in Poughkeepsie with colleague and lover Laura Wylie and they even thought about adopting a child, but they never did. Buck and Wylie took to relevant issues of the community with their membership in the Equal Suffrage League of Poughkeepsie and at the Women's City and County Club. Buck herself was a member of the Socialist Party of New York. She also founded the Poughkeepsie Community Theater as a way to encourage collaboration between social classes. Her textbooks were written for female students and encouraged them in learning and in the participation of politics.

While at Vassar, Buck wrote a number of poems, plays, essays, and textbooks, however her goal was not to become widely published but rather she put her focus on restructuring the Vassar curriculum. "The Present Status of Rhetorical Theory" (1900) documents Buck's ideas against Sophist rhetoric, calling it "socially irresponsible" because it only developed around the idea of persuasion not action. Buck's writings developed around the idea of incorporating individuals with the social community in pursuit of truth.

- "The Present Status of Rhetorical Theory" (1900)

== Mary Augusta Jordan ==
(1855–1941) Mary Augusta Jordan was a professor of English at Smith College from 1884 to 1921. Born to Augusta Woodbury Ricker and Edward Jordan, she and her sisters were provided with the best educational opportunities; namely, Jordan's father sent her to college in 1872 instead of her brother when finances allowed him to send only one child. She graduated in 1876, becoming a Vassar Librarian before earning her Master's of the Arts in English in 1878. In 1884, the Smith College President L. Clark Seelye lured her away from Vassar to his college: she became an assistant professor in rhetoric and Anglo-Saxon; she was able to maintain her teaching positions until she retired in 1921 because she never married, as was custom at that time.

In 1906, she became a full professor at Smith College, as well as the head of the English Department while also serving as an informal adviser to three Smith presidents. As a professor, she was known to encourage honesty and freedom of expression and motivated student self-criticism without loss of self-confidence.

In 1910, she was presented with a Smith College honorary doctorate of Humane Letters, and in 1921, she was then presented with a Syracuse University doctorate of Pedagogy. In that same year, she retired from her teaching position and went to New Haven. In 1922, a house on the east side of the Smith College Quadrangle was named for her. She eventually died in 1941.

As for her writings, Jordan encouraged an understanding of "proper" usage of English grammar, but she acknowledged that writing and speaking embodied different aspects of the English language. "Proper" English was, according to her, whatever one interpreted it to be and how one proceeded to use it.

- Correct Writing and Speaking (1904)
- Shakespeare and the Presumptions
- Assets and Liabilities of Present-Day English
- Nobless Oblige
- Spacious Days at Vassar

== Margaret Sanger ==
(1879–1966) Margaret Sanger was a women's activist in regard to birth control. She was the founder of what is now Planned Parenthood (originally called the American Birth Control League).

- "Letter to the Readers of The Woman Rebel" (1914)

== Emma Goldman ==
(1869–1940) Emma Goldman was a part of an anarchist movement and was considered part of what is known as the first-wave feminist movement.

- "Marriage and Love" (1914)

== Alice Dunbar Nelson ==
(1875–1935) Alice Dunbar Nelson was married to another poet named Paul Laurence Dunbar. She was a poet, journalist and political activist.

- "Facing Life Squarely" (1927)

== Dorothy Day ==
(1897–1980) Dorothy Day was a journalist and social activist known for her defense of the poor and homeless.

- "Memorial Day in Chicago" (1937)

== Virginia Woolf ==
(1882–1941) Virginia Woolf was a member of the Bloomsbury Group and noted for her feminist works. One of her most famous works is Mrs. Dalloway.

- "Professions for Women" (1942)

== Zora Neale Hurston ==
(1891–1960) Zora Neale Hurston was an African-American author and part of the Harlem Renaissance. Her best known work is the novel Their Eyes Were Watching God.

- "Crazy for This Democracy" (1945)

== Simone de Beauvoir ==
(1908–1986) Simone de Beauvoir was a French philosopher, novelist, and essayist who was educated first in a Catholic girls' school, and then studied philosophy at the Sorbonne. She taught philosophy until she was dismissed by the Nazis in 1943. Her most widely known feminist work was The Second Sex, published in 1949.

- The Second Sex (1952)

== Rachel Carson ==
(1907–1964) Rachel Carson was a zoologist and marine biologist who was prominent in the global environmental movement and is credited with helping change the pesticide policy in the United States.

- "A Fable for Tomorrow" (1962)

== Betty Friedan ==
(1921–2006) With the publication of The Feminine Mystique that defined "the problem that has no name" for generations of women, Betty Friedan became a leading force in second wave feminism. She was elected as the first president of the National Organization of Women (NOW) in 1966.

- The Feminine Mystique (1963)

== Adrienne Rich ==
(May 16, 1929 – March 27, 2012) Adrienne Rich was an American feminist, poet, teacher, and writer who has been given awards, and turned some of them down. She is most recognized for her work in the women's movement, but is also involved in the social justice movement.

- "When We Dead Awaken: Writing as Re-Vision" (1971)

== Hélène Cixous ==
(born June 5, 1937) Hélène Cixous is a professor, feminist writer, poet, playwright, philosopher, and rhetorician. She is well known for her work analyzing language and sex.

- "Sorties" (1975)

== Julia Kristeva ==
(born 24 June 1941) Julia Kristeva was born in Bulgaria. She is a philosopher, psychoanalyst, and feminist who added novelist to the list of her accomplishments.

- "Women's Time" (1979)

== Audre Lorde ==
(1934–1992) Audre Lorde was a poet and activist involved in the civil rights, antiwar, and feminist movements.

- "The Transformation of Silence into Language and Action" (1977)

== Merle Woo ==
- "Letter to Ma" (1980),This Bridge Called My Back: Writings by Radical Women of Color, by Cherríe Moraga and Gloria Anzaldúa (Kitchen Table Women of Color Press)
- "Home Movies: A Dramatic Monologue", Three Asian American Writers Speak Out on Feminism, by Mitsuye Yamada, Merle Woo, and Nellie Wong (Radical Women Publications)
- Yellow Woman Speaks: Selected Poems, by Merle Woo (Radical Women Publications)

== Alice Walker ==
(born February 9, 1944) Alice Walker, an African-American author and feminist, wrote the novel The Color Purple. It was awarded both the Pulitzer Prize and the American Book Award. She is well known as an outspoken individual regarding women's rights, race, sexuality, and the importance of culture.

- "In Search of Our Mother's Gardens" (1983)

== Evelyn Fox Keller ==
- A Feeling for the Organism (1983)

== Andrea Dworkin ==
(1946–2005) Andrea Dworkin was an anti-war activist during the Vietnam War. She was also a nationally recognized feminist who stood adamantly against pornography and violence against women.

- "I Want a Twenty-Four Hour Truce During Which There Is No Rape" (1983)

== Paula Gunn Allen ==
(born in 1939) Paula Gunn Allen is a Native American poet, literary critic, activist and novelist. One of her focuses has been the role of women in the Native American culture.

- "Grandmother of the Sun: Ritual Gynocracy in Native America" (1986)

== Gloria Anzaldúa ==
(1942–2004) Gloria Anzaldúa was a feminist and lesbian who was also writer, poet, scholar and activist who focuses on issues of race in both her writing and studies.

- Borderlands (1987)

== June Jordan ==
(1936–2002) June Jordan was an activist, writer, poet, and teacher. She was born to Jamaican immigrants, and after her family moved to Brooklyn, New York, US, she was the only black student attending her high school.

- "Don't You Talk About My Momma!" (1987)

== Trinh T. Minh-Ha ==
(born in Vietnam, 1952) Trinh T. Minh-Ha immigrated to the United States in 1970. She studied music and literature at the University of Illinois, where she received her Master of Fine Arts and PhD degrees. Currently, she is both the Chancellor's Distinguished Professor of Women's Studies at the University of California, Berkeley, and an associate professor of cinema, San Francisco State University. She is a filmmaker, writer, literary theorist, and composer who focuses much of her work around identity.

- Women, Native, Other: Writing Postcoloniality and Feminism (1989)

== bell hooks ==
(born September 25, 1952) bell hooks was born Gloria Jean Watkins and is a social activist who is internationally known. Her works focus on race, class, and gender and the oppression by, and of, each.

- "Homeplace (a site of resistance)" (1990)

== Nancy Mairs ==
- Carnal Acts (1990)

== Terry Tempest-Williams ==
- "The Clan of One-Breasted Women" (1991)

== Minnie Bruce Pratt ==
- "Gender Quiz" (1995)

== Dorothy Allison ==
(born April 11, 1949) Dorothy Allison is a writer, speaker, and professor. Her works focus on themes surrounding women: class struggle, child and sexual abuse, women, lesbianism, feminism, and family. She is well known for her first novel Bastard Out of Carolina, which was published in 1992.

- Two of Three Things I Know for Sure (1995)

== Nomy Lamm ==
- "It's a Big Fat Revolution" (1995)

== Leslie Marmon Silko ==
(born Leslie Marmon on March 5, 1948) Leslie Marmon Silko is a mix of Native American, European American, and Mexican American ancestry, and is recognized as a Laguna descent writer. She was raised on the edge of a reservation and attended a Catholic school. She associates most strongly with her Laguna ancestry.

- "Yellow Woman and a Beauty of the Spirit" (1996)

== Ruth Behar ==
(born 1962) Ruth Behar is a feminist, anthropologist, poet, writer, and professor. She currently teaches at the University of Michigan.

- "Anthropology That Breaks Your Heart" (1996)

== Gloria Steinem ==
(1934–2026) Gloria Steinem was probably the most recognized American feminist. She was a journalist and spokeswoman for women's rights. After working as an assistant editor, she became a freelance journalist. Eventually, she founded Ms. magazine.

- "Supremacy Crimes" (1999)

== Cheryl Glenn ==
Cheryl Glenn is a Distinguished Professor of English and Women’s Studies at Pennsylvania State University. Her research focuses on the history of women’s rhetoric and writing practices, feminist theories and practices, inclusive rhetorical practices and theories, and the teaching of writing.

Glenn has received much praise for her contributions to the rhetorical field. In 2009, she received the Rhetorician of the Year Award. In 2019, she received the Exemplar Award from the Conference on College Composition and Communication (CCCC), where she served as Chair of the CCCC in 2008. She has held many of leadership positions and has held lectures and workshops worldwide.

Glenn has published a number of books, articles, and essays. One of her notable works includes “The language of rhetorical feminism, anchored in hope.” In this essay, Glenn defines rhetorical feminism, discusses the importance of hope, and relates how this could revolutionize traditional democratic and rhetorical practices. Marginalized groups have been excluded from traditional practices, which has led to the creation of rhetorical feminism. Rhetorical feminism promotes inclusivity, human rights, and justice by redefining who can be a rhetor and who audiences are. Hope serves as the foundation of rhetorical feminism. Glen writes, “Anchored in (1) hope, rhetorical feminism offers ways to (2) disidentify with hegemonic rhetoric; (3) be responsible to marginalized people even if we ourselves are marginalized; (4) establish dialogue and collaboration; (5) emphasize understanding; (6) accept vernaculars, emotions, and personal experiences; and (7) use and respect alternative rhetorical practices.” She includes excerpts from theorists and “disidentifying women” such as Gearheart and bell hooks. Glenn notes that understanding, listening (especially to and from marginalized groups), and creating space for conversation and collaboration are important rhetorical feminism practices. In doing so, the hope is that all voices can be uplifted.
