= Laura Wylie =

Laura Wylie may refer to:

- Laura Wylie (novelist), pen name used by American writer Patricia Matthews
- Laura Johnson Wylie (1855–1932), college professor, head of the English department at Vassar College
- Lollie Belle Wylie (1858–1923), American poet and composer, also known as Laura Isabelle Wylie
