= On Lies, Secrets and Silence =

1979 book by Adrienne Rich

- First edition
- Author: Adrienne Rich
- Language: English
- Genre: Feminist
- Publisher: W. W. Norton & Company
- Publication date: 1979
- Pages: 310
- ISBN: 0393012336
- OCLC: 32886500

On Lies, Secrets and Silence (ISBN 0393312852) is a 310-page, non-fiction book written by Adrienne Rich and published by W. W. Norton & Company in 1979. The book follows the author, Adrienne Rich telling and informing the readers about themes and aspects of her life and work. Other topics which the book cover include the politics of language, racism and history.
