= The Dream of a Common Language =

1976 poetry book by Adrienne Rich

The Dream of a Common Language is a work of poetry written by award-winning author and activist Adrienne Rich.

The book is divided into three sections: first "Power"; second "Twenty One Love Poems"; third "Not Somewhere Else, But Here".

The collection of poems was the first book Rich published after she came out as a lesbian in 1976. In it, she explores the concept of a common language, to be achieved through poetry, art, and feminist ideas. The book is an integration of the author's personal life and social and political beliefs.

The section, "Power," contains poems about noted accomplishments of individual women, that she relates to all women. The poem, "Power," discusses Marie Curie's discovery of two elements, polonium and radium, which made her powerful but eventually led to her death. The eight poems in this section comment on the need for the nature of power to be redefined, in order to include women in a way that does not destroy them. The poems show a necessary change in ideologies to achieve the common language.

The section, "Twenty-one Love Poems," is a group of lesbian love poems that aim to present the power of love between two women and the need to change the cultural values that do not recognize this as a kind of love. The love poems comment on how women involved in lesbian relationships are alienated because their love is not recognized by the world. The relationship that the poems are about disintegrates by the end because societal and cultural forces prevented it from lasting. The poem, "XVII," mentions these forces working "within us and against us, against us and within us."

The section, "Not Somewhere Else, But Here," continues to discuss female relationships, now in relation to nature. The poem, "Natural Resources," presents common elements in the lives of women, compared to the elements in nature. The poem, "Transcendental Etude," celebrates the power of women to create on a large scale from ordinary materials. These and the other eight poems in the section show the power that women have in order to convey how the nature of language should be changed, how ideologies must change, how masculine definitions of power must be redefined, to create a common language.

== Critical Analysis ==
Critics of The Dream of a Common Language assert that, while written as a way to process her lesbian freedom, Rich also wrote for other women in hopes that they would also learn to accept their identities. Meredith Benjamin, in her own critical analysis of Rich, wrote that one of Rich's aims in publishing The Dream of a Common Language was to show women that they could live outside of the parameters set for them by men. Not a complete optimist, Rich tried to stay realistic about what she saw as possible in her sex's future, but she wrote as if she also knew that there could be joy in it. In an article for the Women's Studies journal, Benjamin wrote that Rich felt that women would have to step away from the identity they carried with them for the sake status quo and embrace their true and brave identity. Other critics, Soghra and Pourgiv, wrote that Rich was writing for her fellow women to accept and love their feminine bodies. For example, the section of Common Language titled "Twenty One Love Poems" is devoted to love between women and love for the feminine self. Rich wrote in hopes that women reading her poetry would see a bit themselves reflected back and learn to live boldly.

Genre: Poetry
Publisher: W. W. Norton & Company (April 17, 1993)
Paperback: 96 pages
Language: English

Genre: Poetry
Publisher: W. W. Norton & Co.; First Edition/First Printing/Foxing edition (1 April 1978)
Paperback: 77 pages
Language: English
