= Gertrude Buck =

American rhetorician

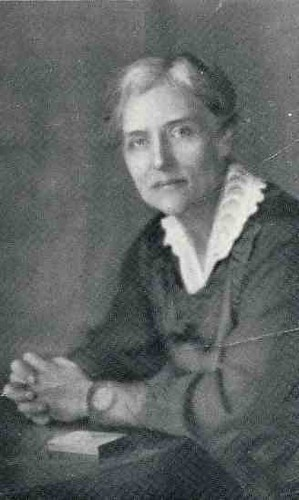
Gertrude Buck

Gertrude Buck (July 14, 1871 – January 8, 1922) was one of a group of powerful female rhetoricians of her time. She strived to inspire young women to take on leadership roles within the democracy using the written word. She wrote many books, plays, articles, and poems relating to her cause. Buck dedicated her life to "challenging the patriarchal paradigm with her reformist views of pedagogy and rhetoric".

== Early life ==
Buck was born in Kalamazoo, Michigan. Her parents were Judge M. Buck and Annie Buck.

As part of a new generation of women that had the opportunity to attend college, Buck graduated from the University of Michigan with a bachelor of science in 1884, a Master of Science in 1895, and a PhD in Rhetoric and Composition in 1898. Buck was the first student of Michigan's Fred Newton Scott to receive a PhD in this field.

Gertrude Buck's thesis, completed for her master's degree, was on the metaphor. Her approach is mostly psychological, describing metaphors as a result of primitive human behavior that confuses different things as the same. However, she states that the civilized human is able to immediately distinguish between the two items. The poetic metaphor, then, is a representation of the primitive perception of two different items as the same which are known to be inherently different.

== Career ==
During the time before receiving her PhD, Buck taught composition classes at Indianapolis High School and Detroit Normal Training School before taking a position at Vassar College in 1897. At Vassar, Buck taught a variety of courses including rhetorical theory, literary criticism, composition, argument, poetics, English lyric poetry, and drama. She published a thesis on the psychology of rhetoric, a dissertation on the metaphor, several textbooks on composition for use in her classes, a book on literary criticism, a variety of articles on rhetoric and other topics, and many poems and plays. In her many years as a scholar and teacher, she developed specific views on language, the composing process, and the implications of psychology on the study of rhetoric. Buck taught at Vassar for twenty four years leading up to her death in 1922.

Buck felt strongly about the contemporary trends in the teaching of language and writing. She criticized the way grammar was taught to students - especially sentence structure. She believed that the way in which sentence structure was taught did not take into account the mental processes of the listener and speaker. Buck was known for her, as worded by Gerald Mulderig, her amoeba and tree diagrams - diagrams that described the process of composition in reference to the splitting of amoebas in individual sentences and the creation of complex sentences as branches of a tree. It is important to recognize that Buck rejected sentence structuring and diagramming, and believed the creation of sentences was a natural and organic, based on the mental processes of the creator. She stressed the importance of the rhetorical situation as "a real occasion for writing and a real audience to be addressed". Students, she thought, become more focused on following the rules of sentence diagramming than genuinely communicating - thus, Buck attempted to guide students away from the rules that govern their day-to-day thinking so they might be free to discover language as communication.

Although her published contributions were significant, Buck's main goal was the reconstruction of pedagogy within the English Department at Vassar College. She rejected the educational traditions of the time such as grammar rules and sentence structure and advocated for a "student-centered pedagogy" which emphasized individuality in order to create intelligent students who could ably participate in democracy. Buck's ideas of contemporary pedagogy began during her days at Detroit Normal Training School, where she worked closely with Harriet M. Scott to enforce a curriculum that catered to the interests of individual students rather than premeditated themes and topics. As she continued her teaching career at Vassar College, Buck, with the accompaniment of Laura Wylie, embraced women's rights and attempted to empower female students to take on roles in leadership and thinking through her own pedagogical ideals.

== Reform movements ==
Naturally, Buck contributed to other movements aside from educational reform such as the suffrage and Little Theater movements. She "prompted Vassar students to consider women in a positive and powerful light and to envision themselves in ways that extend beyond the domestic sphere". Plus, she believed participation in theater prepared female students for participation in democracy. In light of this, Buck initiated the dramatic workshop at Vassar College, which is said to be one of her most substantial accomplishments. The dramatic workshop eventually became the Poughkeepsie Community Theatre in 1920. Buck's own plays were sometimes performed there and often brought to attention the gender and class assumptions of society and featured strong female characters.

Buck was also a member of the Socialist Party of New York.

== Contribution to rhetoric ==
Gertrude Buck's ideas on rhetoric and pedagogy paved the way for today's New Rhetoricians. Although her contributions may have been historically overlooked, her ideas about education and a student-centered approach to teaching are fundamental to the way in which we educate students today.

Buck was famous for her short essay "The Present Status of Rhetorical Theory." Interpreting the insights by pre-Socratic sophists, Buck denoted sophistic rhetoric as violent and manipulative with less regard to listeners as she called it as “purely predatory-primitive aggression to the weak." The art of rhetoric is the art of war.” Buck echoed rhetoric as “a real communication between speaker and hearer, to the equal advantage of both, and thus a real function of the social organism." Buck's notion was aligned with the idea of Platonic for imposing the egalitarian position of a speaker and hearers to reach their communicative goals. Buck’s works are groundbreaking for the establishment for ethics in feminist rhetoric as they interrupted the western tradition which has been dominated by male cultural practices and the binary concepts of “argument as male and narrative as female." This essentialism of women characteristics becomes antithetical to democratic values that Buck attempted to break in her era which became the beginning of Feminism move.

== Personal life and death ==
Buck lived out most of her life after college in Poughkeepsie, New York with close friend and colleague, Laura Johnson Wylie. The two were rumored to be lovers. She never married or had any children.

Buck died at her Poughkeepsie home on January 8, 1922.

== See also ==
- List of feminist rhetoricians
- Fred Newton Scott
- Michigan Women's Hall of Fame
