= Split at the Root: An Essay on Jewish Identity =

1982 essay by Adrienne Rich

- Author: Adrienne Rich
- Media type: Essay
- Subject: Jewish identity

Split at the Root: An Essay on Jewish Identity is a 1982 essay by American poet and activist Adrienne Rich. The essay explores Rich's patrilineal Jewish heritage and her maternal Protestant heritage, as well as issues of Jewish identity, antisemitism, racism, whiteness, class, The Holocaust, and Jewish assimilation.

== About ==
The essay explores Rich's complicated identity as the daughter of a white Jewish father of Ashkenazi and Sephardi heritage and a white Episcopalian mother, both of whom had Southern roots. Rich acknowledges that she cannot be considered Jewish according to traditional halakha (Jewish religious law) nor would she be considered Jewish under her own lesbian-feminist theory that places primacy on maternal inheritance, but nonetheless refers to herself as a Jewish lesbian "raised to be a heterosexual gentile". The term "Split at the root" comes from a 1960 poem she wrote where she refers to herself as "Split at the root, neither Gentile nor Jew,/Yankee nor Rebel." Her father was born in Birmingham, Alabama and her mother was a "white Southern Protestant" from Wilmington, North Carolina.

== See also ==
- Who is a Jew?
- Jewish adjacent
- Patrilineal Jew
