= Of Woman Born: Motherhood as Experience and Institution =

1976 book by Adrienne Rich

Of Woman Born: Motherhood as Experience and Institution is a 1976 book by American poet, scholar, and essayist Adrienne Rich that examines motherhood from the lens of personal experience, anthropology, and feminist theory. Rich researched and wrote the book over a 4 year period because she felt that motherhood “was a crucial, still relatively unexplored, area for feminist theory.” It has been described by the Los Angeles Times as a landmark work in the literature of motherhood.

== Summary ==
Of Woman Born begins with a foreword describing one of the book’s central aims: to begin to fill in the gap between the universal experience of motherhood and what is known about it: “We know more about the air we breathe, the seas we travel, than about the nature and meaning of motherhood.” The foreword also describes the book’s aim to create a distinction between motherhood as an experience, which Rich defines as “the potential relationship of any woman to her powers of reproduction and to children” and motherhood as an institution—the social and political systems that define, limit, and control the experience of motherhood.

=== Anger and Tenderness ===
Using entries from her journal, Rich illustrates the conflicting feelings she experienced as a young mother of three in the 1950’s: tenderness and anger, ambition and weariness, power and powerlessness. She describes how, from an early age, she struggled to bridge the gap between the feminine ideals of the 1950’s, and her own vision of herself as a serious, independent poet. She describes the outline of her young adult life: married to a Cambridge academic at the age of 22, three children by the age of 29, her decision to be sterilized after her third child, her struggle to write while raising young children. Rich then examines the many assumptions her younger self had accepted as inevitable: that her experience as a mother was simply “the human condition;” that motherhood and child care had always looked this way; that mothers acted on instinct alone; that the only person developing in the mother-child relationship was the child. Rich ends the chapter citing her hope and belief that culture will come to see female biology “as a resource, rather than a destiny.”

=== The Sacred Calling ===
Rich traces the shifting roles of women in the United States and England over the 19th century, and illustrates how women went from essential, widely-skilled, productive members of their homesteads in pre-industrial eras to isolated individuals whose role was limited to “the specialization of motherhood.” She describes how the growth of factories in the Industrial Revolution separated the home from the “man’s world” of wage-earning, ambition, and power, and created the ideal of the home as the “woman’s sphere” of refuge and retreat, a relatively recent concept in human history. “The home thus defined had never before existed. It was a creation of the Industrial Revolution, an ideal invested with the power of something God-given, and its power as an idea remains unexpunged today.” She identifies the repercussions of this shift for women and mothers: isolation, loneliness, powerlessness, and a narrow definition of a woman’s capacities.

=== The Kingdom of the Fathers ===
In this chapter, Rich explores the roots, characteristics, and consequences of patriarchy, which she defines as “the power of the fathers.” She identifies the advent of private property and inherited wealth as key foundations of patriarchal order, and a tendency to think in “positive-negative polarities”—rational/irrational, powerful/powerless—as key characteristics. Power itself, Rich states, and power over others, “is a primal relationship under patriarchy,” most often exemplified through a man’s control over his wife and children. Monotheism, in which an all-powerful, usually male god, causes this patriarchal power structure to become “internalized as ‘conscience,’ ‘tradition,’ ‘the moral law within.” Rich discusses how women have mostly experienced power as a negative force. She identifies the renewed interest in matriarchal and pre-patriarchal cultures that characterized feminist and counter-culture movements of the 1960’s and 1970’s as efforts “to reintegrate what has been named the unconscious, the subjective, the emotional with the structural, the rational, the intellectual.”

=== The Primacy of the Mother ===
Rich examines how the field of anthropology has opened an awareness of other societies not based on patriarchal order or lineage, either in the form of pre-patriarchal or matriarchal societies. She cites the importance of this work to women and to feminist studies: “If women were powerful once, a precedent exists; if female biology was ever once a source of power, it need not remain what it has since become: a root of powerlessness.” She cites the work of JJ Bachofen and Robert Briffault as foundations for early feminist anthropological works like Helen Diner’s Mothers and Amazons and Elizabeth Gould Davis’ The First Sex. Noting that the existence of a “true universal matriarchy” is impossible to prove, Rich reflects instead on woman-centered or “gynocentric” periods of human culture “when Woman was venerated in several aspects, the primal one being maternal.” Rich argues that in these periods, women’s essential roles in the survival and thriving of human communities—through fertility, child nurturance, food production and preservation—were highly valued as “the transformations necessary for the continuation of life.” Rich identifies this “transforming power,” versus “power over others” as hallmarks of women-centered versus male-centered societies.

=== The Domestication of Motherhood ===
Expanding on the previous chapter, Rich lays out several theories that attempt to explain how human societies shifted from female-centered to male-centered over time. She examines Friedrich Engels’ theory of private ownership and patrilineal inheritance, theories that posit the early protective role of human males as an origin of male dominance, and the work of psychologists Erich Neumann and Karen Horney, that cite the life-giving powers of females as a source of both reverence and fear. Taking up early religion and mythology, Rich traces the shift from mother-goddess to male-centered monotheism in Egypt and Greece, the disappearance of female figurines as objects of worship, and a shift in the image of the divine family—the mother figure changing from the all-giving, self-sustaining “Great Mother” to an unequal, subordinate role increasingly limited to the domestic and maternal.

=== Hands of Flesh, Hands of Iron ===
Turning to the history of childbirth, Rich points out that, until the 18th century, “childbirth was overwhelmingly the province of women.” She identifies several reasons for this: women’s extensive first-hand experience with childbirth and female anatomy; cultural taboos against men’s involvement in the labor process; the perception of midwifery as beneath the dignity of male physicians, who were brought into childbirth cases only in emergencies. She examines how the establishment of Christianity in the Middle Ages created impediments to safe childbirth practices on several fronts: by viewing midwifery, attached to the female body and its reproductive organs, as an unclean profession; by prioritizing the baptism of the infant, even in utero, over the life and health of the mother; and by a limited understanding of female anatomy due to the Church’s prohibition of cadaver dissection. Rich traces the beginning of obstetrics as a male profession to 1663, when a court physician attended to the birth of a favorite mistress of Louis XIV, creating demand in the upper classes for the man-midwife, a lucrative profession that relied on the knowledge and practices of female midwives. Rich relates the controversial history of the forceps, invented in England in the 1600’s by man-midwife Peter Chamberlen, whose family kept the device a closely-guarded secret until 1721. The growing use of forceps in the late 1700’s set off a debate in the midwife community, who claimed the tool was overused, misused, and often harmful to the mother of the infant, as argued by Elizabeth Nihell in her 1760 Treatise on the Art of Midwifery. >Rich closes the chapter with a history of puerperal fever, often called “childbirth fever,” which reached epidemic proportions over the 18th and 19th centuries, as childbirth moved from home births guided by midwives to hospital births attended by physicians who did not yet understand the link between bacteria and infection. Rich notes that even the male physicians who investigated the deadly impact of contagion on mothers giving birth—Alexander Gordon, Oliver Wendell Holmes, and Ignaz Philipp Semmelweis—were ignored or attacked by the male obstetric community until the end of the 19th century, when bacterial infection became widely understood.

=== Alienated Labor ===
In this chapter, Rich examines the ways women have been alienated from the process of childbirth over the course of history. She notes that most male-dominated societies have framed childbirth as a woman’s most important contribution to the family, lineage, or society, and how this emphasis has led many modern women to view the choice as “an inescapable either/or: motherhood or individuation.” Rich discusses how negative cultural attitudes around pregnancy, childbirth, and pain—as punishment for original sin, as physical defilement, as fear of death—further remove women from a healthy relationship to the process. She examines the physical and psychological repercussions of the introduction of anesthesia in childbirth in the late 19th century, the backlash from the midwife community, and the subsequent evolution of modern natural childbirth practices. Rich describes her personal experience giving birth under general anesthesia for all three of her pregnancies in the 1950’s, lamenting the ways medical technology—from artificial induction to anesthesia—often create a cascading effect of complications that require further intervention. She argues for a perspective that views birth not as “a sudden crisis to be handled by others,” or the central event of a woman’s life, but “as a continuum, interwoven inextricably with the entire spectrum of a woman’s life”, and one event in the unfolding of a woman’s evolving relationship to her body, sexuality, and strength.

=== Mother and Son, Woman and Man ===
Through examples from literature, psychology, religion, and popular culture, Rich argues that the mother-son relationship has often been regarded as either overly sentimental or toxic, characterized by control, suffering, and guilt. She explores the long shadow cast by Freud over the psychology of the mother-son relationship, a framework she argues is reductive, narrowly biological, and regressive. She looks at changes in perspective on mother-son relations led by developments in psychology and the women’s movement of the 1970’s, and the difficult questions faced by feminist mothers raising boys in a male-dominated culture. She argues against the assumption that feminists hate men, stating “it is absurd to think that women on the path of feminism wish to abandon their sons, emotionally or otherwise.” On the path of individuation from child to man, Rich imagines a choice for sons that is broader than aggression and defense over fear and feeling, instead offering the chance to realize “that strength and vulnerability, toughness and expressiveness, nurturance and authority, are not opposites, not the sole inheritance of one sex or another.” Taking up the question of what women who are beginning to challenge the values of patriarchy truly want for their sons, she concludes that the answer is “to discover new ways of being men even as we are discovering new ways of being women.” To that end, she urges an end to the separation of a public “male” world and a private “female” one, and a refusal of “the traditional separation between ‘love’ and ‘work.”

=== Motherhood and Daughterhood ===
Rich begins the chapter with a description of her relationship with her own mother, a talented concert pianist and composer who sacrificed her career to marry and raise children according to her husband’s strict rules, and the anger she felt towards her mother for not protecting her from her father’s overbearing demands. She then explores the physical and psychological bonds that can lead to “the deepest mutuality and the most painful estrangement”< between mothers and daughters, citing Virginia Woolf, Emily Dickinson, and Sylvia Plath as examples. She defines matrophobia as the fear of becoming one’s mother, and explains the cultural and economic issues that make this fear prevalent. She describes the loss of the mother-daughter bond as “the essential female tragedy,” as illustrated by the Greek myth of Demeter and Kore and the subsequent importance of the Eleusinian mysteries of ancient Greece. She discusses how women who have felt “unmothered” may look for mother-figures in their own lives, or by mothering others in various helping professions. She maintains that although the intense bond between mothers and daughters can be destructive, “there is no reason why it is doomed to be.” She argues that the nurture of daughters requires “trust and tenderness” and “courageous mothering”, and that a mother’s “primary bequest to her daughter” is the quality of her own life, “because a woman who can believe in herself, who is a fighter, and who continues to struggle to create livable space around her, is demonstrating to her daughter that these possibilities exist.” She closes the chapter with a discussion of the reasons women may choose not to have children, their important contributions to the lives of women, and the equal importance of non-biological mother figures in a woman’s life.

=== Violence: The Heart of Maternal Darkness ===
Using a 1974 case of infanticide as an example, Rich explores the history of infanticide, from legal infanticide practiced as population control in Sparta, Rome, Japan, and China, to infanticide by mothers who faced excommunication or execution due to religious laws against unwed mothers, and infanticide in response to poverty. Rich argues that infanticide, rather than being exclusively an act of psychosis, is often a response to depression, lack of reproductive choice, and desperate economic conditions. On abortion, Rich argues that abortion laws across the globe have fluctuated in keeping with a country’s economic and military needs, citing the Soviet Union, Japan, and China as 20th century examples, and advocates for safe, widely available, effective birth control. In her closing arguments, Rich urges women to examine the forces that shape the experience of motherhood, and to distinguish between what is natural and what is imposed by society. “The institution of motherhood cannot be touched or seen,” she states, arguing that economic dependence, laws limiting reproductive choice, lack of social benefits for mothers and adequate childcare, unequal pay, and the isolation of full-time motherhood are “connecting fibers of this invisible institution, and they determine our relationship to our children whether we like to think so or not.” Rich sees hope in what women have managed to maintain for themselves and their children—“the tenderness, the passion, the trust in our instincts, the evocation of a courage we did not know we owned, the detailed apprehension of another human existence, the full realization of the cost and precariousness of life.” In closing, she argues that these qualities can and should effect positive change in the world at large: “The mother’s battle for her child—with sickness, with poverty, with war, with all the forces of exploitation and callousness that cheapen human life—needs to become a common human battle, waged in love and in the passion for survival.”

== Legacy ==
Of Woman Born has been described by the Los Angeles Times as a landmark work in the literature of motherhood. Writing in 2018, literary critic Sandra Gilbert stated that Of Woman Born "was, and is, a groundbreaking feminist study that brilliantly exemplifies the innovative scholarship energized by what has come to be called the 'second wave' of the women's movement."

In a 2021 essay for Ploughshares, scholar Cynthia R. Wallace noted that, "When Of Woman Born came out, Rich had already been a widely acclaimed poet for a quarter of a century, but this book received more attention than any of her previous publications and polarized reviewers. It's hard to overstate how influential the book was among readers, activists, and later, scholars."

== Reception ==
=== Critical response ===
Writing in the New York Review of Books in 1976, the critic Helen Vendler labeled Of Woman Born as "partisan writing" that often lapsed into "a rhetoric of sentimentality," while acknowledging that "the book has a certain cumulative force, not so much on account of its theorizing as because of its undeniable feelings and its inarguable social facts." In The New York Times Book Review, Francine Du Plessix Gray wrote "Of Woman Born is almost two books, one moving, one maddening," praising the book's autobiographical writing while criticizing its "unoriginal muddled polemics against patriarchy." In The Village Voice, Jane Lazarre called the book "compelling and compassionate," and "the best analysis I have seen of what we mean when we speak of patriarchy." The 1976 Kirkus review predicted that "Dynamic, woman-centered, frequently persuasive and even disarming, this is certain to spark controversy for its uncompromising stance and its more surprising documented findings."

=== Public response ===
On its publication in October 1976, Of Woman Born sold well, was translated into numerous foreign languages, and was released as a mass-market paperback in 1977. A tenth anniversary edition was released by Norton in 1986 with a new introduction by Rich, and re-issued in 1995. A new edition was released by Norton in 2021, with a new foreword by author Eula Biss and an introduction by author Dani McClain.
