= Laura Johnson Wylie =

American academic

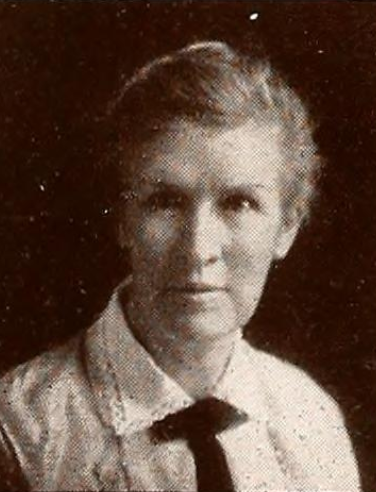
- Laura Johnson Wylie, from the 1917 yearbook of Vassar College
- Born: December 1, 1855; Milton, Pennsylvania, U.S.
- Died: April 2, 1932 (age 76); Poughkeepsie, New York, U.S.
- Occupation(s): Professor of English, suffragist
- Partner: Gertrude Buck

Laura Johnson Wylie (December 1, 1855 – April 2, 1932) was a college professor. She was one of the first women to earn a Ph.D. at Yale University, in 1894. She taught English at Vassar College from 1895 to 1924; she was head of the English department for most of her tenure there.

== Early life and education ==
Wylie was born in Milton, Pennsylvania, the daughter of William Theodorus Wylie and Sarah Murray Johnson Wylie. Her father was a Presbyterian minister; her mother died Wylie was four years old, and her father remarried twice. She graduated from Vassar College in 1877, as valedictorian of her class. She was one of the first women admitted to a graduate program at Yale University, where she completed doctoral studies in 1894; her thesis was the first thesis by a woman published by Yale.

== Career ==
Wylie taught Latin and English at Packer Collegiate Institute in Brooklyn from 1884 to 1892, while she was in graduate school. English at Vassar College from 1895 to 1924, and was head of the English department beginning for most of that time. She and her colleague Lucy Maynard Salmon co-founded Vassar's Equal Suffrage League in 1909, and she was president of the league and its successor organization, the Women's City and County Club, until 1928. She served on the board of the Poughkeepsie Community Theatre, and left $10,000 to the theater in her will. In retirement, she taught at the Bryn Mawr Summer School for Women Workers, and spoke to community groups about literature.

== Publications ==
Wylie wrote two textbooks. She edited a collection of Gertrude Buck's poems and plays, and school editions of The Winter's Tale and Adam Bede.

- Studies in the Evolution of English Criticism (1894)
- Social Studies in English Literature (1916)
- "What Can Be Done About It?" (1918)

== Personal life ==
Wylie's partner was fellow Vassar professor Gertrude Buck. They shared a house on Market Street in Poughkeepsie, and hosted suffrage meetings and other groups there. Wylie died in 1932, at the age of 76. Eleanor Roosevelt contributed to Miss Wylie of Vassar (1934), a tribute book of essays about Wylie.
