= When We Dead Awaken: Writing as Re-Vision =

Essay by Adrienne Rich

When We Dead Awaken: Writing as Re-Vision, originally published in College English in the fall of 1972, is an essay by American feminist, poet, teacher, and writer Adrienne Rich (1929–2012). It discusses several concepts needed by women writers to enable them to overcome the conditioning of a patriarchal sense of literary aesthetics and history. The essay, originally a lecture delivered by Rich at a women's writer convention, emphasizes the need for re-visioning of old texts, renaming of the various aspects of women which have been distorted by a male point of view, and developing a new form of writing that is free of the haunting male gaze, of convention and propriety and of the ‘male’ language and its implications.

Rich says that the act of re-visioning would help women to analyze and to act on “how we live, how we have been living, how we have been led to imagine ourselves, how our language has trapped as well as liberated us, how the very act of naming has been till now a male prerogative, how we can begin to see and name – and therefore live – afresh.”

== Motivations behind the essay ==
The essay by Rich was written to support her gender, to let women know that they need to break from the roles which society places upon them. “Until we can understand the assumptions in which we are drenched we cannot know ourselves.” Rich stood up for the fact that women had a chance to no longer be afraid to embrace who they are, their individuality; the person that they were other than when they were conforming to societal norms. Rich invested in the term, “fresh eyes” with which she wanted women to see the world; with “fresh eyes,” or seeing the world with a new outlook. An outlook where women do not have to be dominated by men, an outlook where women have a voice and have control as well. Finally, writing the essay was an attempt for Rich's own self-knowledge, in which she works to find her own self-identification. Although she wanted to motivate women in a male-dominated society, she was also motivating herself to refuse self-destructiveness in the male-dominated world.

== Literary connections ==
The title of the essay is from the play When We Dead Awaken by Henrik Ibsen. The theme of Ibsen's play is the desire and appreciation of life. The play surrounds Irene, a former model and mysterious character, and her idea that although they have been alive, they have not been living. “When we dead awaken we find that we have never lived.”.

The theme of living as opposed to just being alive can be connected to Rich's theme about women being degraded by society. Although the women that she writes for have been alive, they have not been fully living their lives. Her essay's goal is to motivate women, including herself, to stand up for their rights as human beings: to be equal to the men in a society ruled by men. As Ibsen did in his play, Rich encourages women to “live,” breaking out of their closed shells to do what they want, rather than following what society tells them they must do.

== Personal context: gender and creativity ==
Adrienne Rich was married and had three children during the 1950s. Rich described the fifties as a time when “middle-class women were making careers of domestic perfection”. After having her third child, Rich feared she lost touch with whomever she had been prior to assuming the traditional gender role of wife and mother. The wife-mother role according to Rich required a “putting aside” of the imaginative activity necessary in creative writing. This imaginative activity requires a “freedom of the mind” that transcends and transforms daily experiences by questioning, challenging and conceiving alternatives in regards to reality. Rich states that being “a female human being trying to fulfill traditional female functions in a traditional way is in direct conflict with the subversive functions of the imagination.”

Rich desired time to think and to write, but she felt that there was never enough time due to the full-time job of being a mother and a wife. The fifties and the early sixties were "years of revelations" for Rich and she needed to think for herself and about her relationship to the ideas of “pacifism and dissent and violence, poetry and society”. Rich was beginning to feel that politics was not simply external, but also internal and “of the essence of her condition. She then began to write directly about her experiences as a woman whenever she had the time. It was at this point that Rich noticed the "fragments and scraps" had “a common theme and a common consciousness” that she had been unwilling to put on paper before, as she had been taught that poetry had to be "universal". This “universal” style meant "nonfemale" and connected to Rich's previous acknowledgment of her style as having been formed at first by male poets. Before this, she tried hard not to identify herself as a female poet. The common themes she found in her work at this time included resistance and rebellion regarding gender roles and stereotypes.

== The "reawakening" ==
Rich believed that the anger felt by women throughout the ages was necessary for creativity and change to flourish. The "victimization and anger experienced by women are real", according to Rich, "and have real sources, everywhere in the environment, built into society, language, the structure of thought."

Rich speaks of "a new generation of women poets" moving towards the "new space" on the boundaries of patriarchy. Women, according to Rich, are "speaking to and of women due to a newly unleashed courage to name, to love each other, to share risk and grief and celebration." Rich ends the essay by stating that women have much to do, as the "creative energy of patriarchy is running out, leaving only its self-generating energy for destruction."
