= Adrienne Rich =

American poet, essayist and feminist (1929–2012)

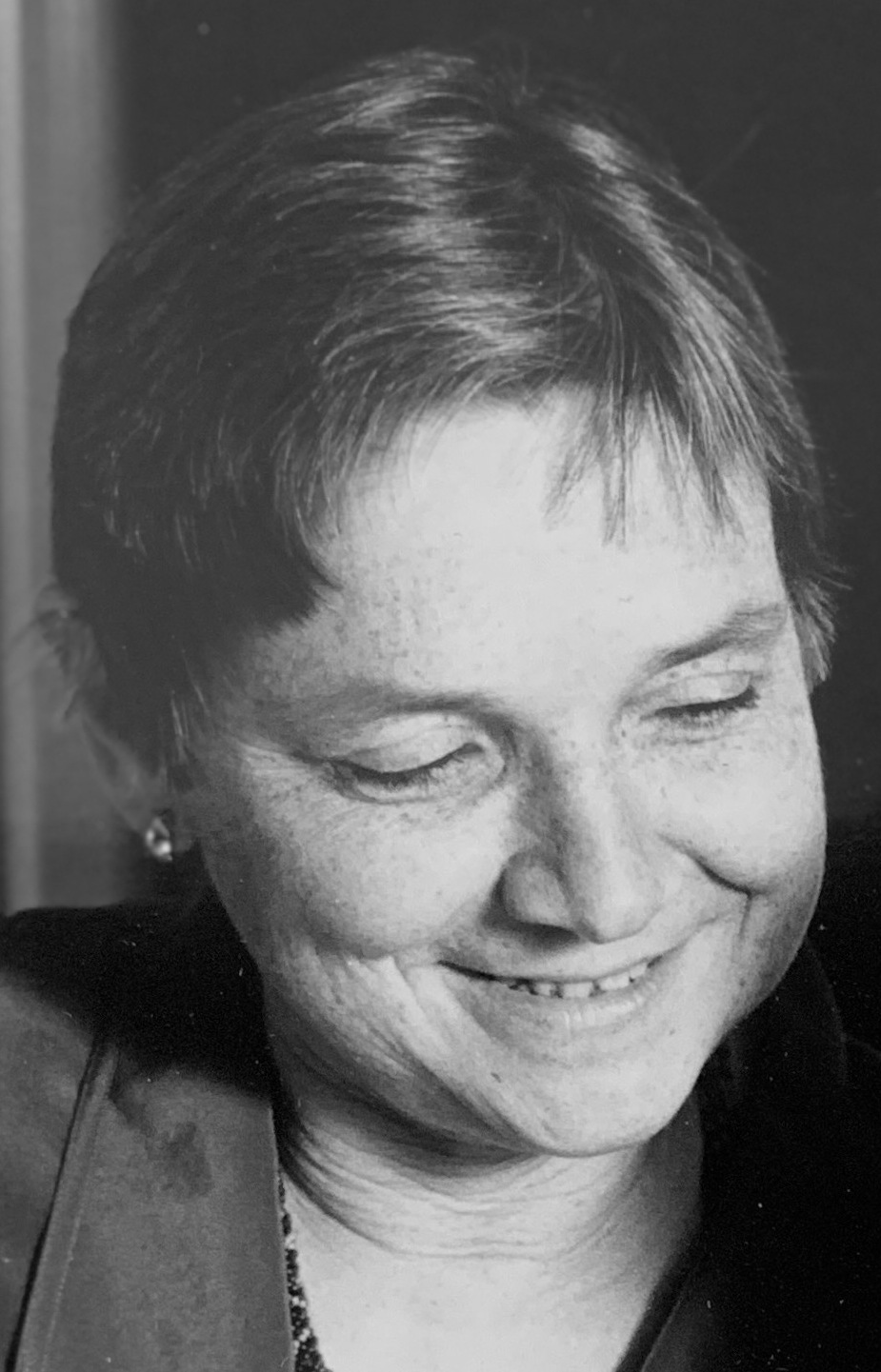
- Rich in 1983
- Born: Adrienne Cecile Rich; May 16, 1929; Baltimore, Maryland, U.S.
- Died: March 27, 2012 (aged 82); Santa Cruz, California, U.S.
- Education: Radcliffe College (BA)
- Occupations: Poet; non-fiction writer; essayist
- Spouse: Alfred Haskell Conrad (m. 1953; died 1970)
- Partner: Michelle Cliff (1976–2012)
- Children: 3
- Writing career
- Genres: Poetry, non-fiction
- Notable work: Diving Into the Wreck
- Notable awards: National Book Award; 1974; Bollingen Prize; 2003; Griffin Poetry Prize; 2010

Adrienne Cecile Rich (/ˈædriɛn/; May 16, 1929 – March 27, 2012) was an American poet, essayist and feminist. She was called "one of the most widely read and influential poets of the second half of the 20th century", and was credited with bringing "the oppression of women and lesbians to the forefront of poetic discourse". Rich criticized the rigid identities that are sometimes created by feminism, called for feminism that is flexible and open to being transformed, and drew attention to the existing current of solidarity and creativity among women, which she named the "lesbian continuum."

Her first collection of poetry, A Change of World, was selected by W. H. Auden for the Yale Series of Younger Poets Award. Auden went on to write the introduction to the book. Rich famously declined the National Medal of Arts to protest House Speaker Newt Gingrich's vote to end funding for the National Endowment for the Arts.

== Early life and education ==
Adrienne Cecile Rich was born in Baltimore, Maryland, on May 16, 1929, the elder of two sisters. Her father, pathologist Arnold Rice Rich, was the chairman of pathology at The Johns Hopkins Medical School. Her mother, Helen Elizabeth (Jones) Rich, was a concert pianist and a composer. Her father was from a Jewish family, and her mother was a Southern Protestant; the girls were raised as Christians. Her paternal grandfather Samuel Rice was an Ashkenazi immigrant from Košice in the Austro-Hungarian Empire (present day Slovakia), while her paternal grandmother was a Sephardic Jew from Vicksburg, Mississippi. Samuel Rice owned a successful shoe store in Birmingham, Alabama.

Adrienne Rich's early poetic influence stemmed from her father, who encouraged her to read but also to write poetry. Her interest in literature was sparked within her father's library, where she read the work of writers such as Ibsen, Arnold, Blake, Keats, Dante Gabriel Rossetti, and Tennyson. Her father was ambitious for Adrienne and "planned to create a prodigy". Adrienne Rich and her younger sister were home schooled by their mother until Adrienne commenced public education in the fourth grade. The poems Sources and After Dark document her relationship with her father, describing how she worked hard to fulfill her parents' ambitions—moving into a world in which excellence was expected.

In later years, Rich went to Roland Park Country School, which she described as a "good old fashioned girls' school [that] gave us fine role models of single women who were intellectually impassioned." After graduating from high school, Rich earned her diploma at Radcliffe College of Harvard University, where she focused on poetry and learning the writing craft, encountering no women teachers at all.

In 1951, her senior year at college, Rich's first collection of poetry, A Change of World, was chosen by the poet W. H. Auden for the Yale Series of Younger Poets Award. He went on to write the introduction to the published volume. Following graduation, Rich received a Guggenheim Fellowship to study at Oxford for a year. After visiting Florence, she chose not to return to Oxford, and spent her remaining time in Europe writing and exploring Italy.

== Early career: 1953–1975 ==
In 1953, Rich married Alfred Haskell Conrad, an economics professor at Harvard University she had met as an undergraduate. She said of the match: "I married in part because I knew no better way to disconnect from my first family. I wanted what I saw as a full woman's life, whatever was possible." They settled in Cambridge, Massachusetts, and had three sons. In 1955, she published her second volume, The Diamond Cutters, a collection she said she wished had not been published, saying "a lot of the poems are incredibly derivative", and citing a "pressure to produce again... to make sure I was still a poet". That year she received the Ridgely Torrence Memorial Award from the Poetry Society of America. Her three children were born in 1955 (David), 1957 (Pablo) and 1959 (Jacob).

We are, I am, you are
by cowardice or courage
the one who find our way
back to this scene
carrying a knife, a camera
a book of myths
in which
our names do not appear.

— From "Diving into the Wreck"
Diving into the Wreck: Poems 1971–1972 (1973)

The 1960s began a period of change in Rich's life: she received the National Institute of Arts and Letters award (1960), her second Guggenheim Fellowship to work at the Netherlands Economic Institute (1961), and the Bollingen Foundation grant for the translation of Dutch poetry (1962).

In 1963, Rich published her third collection, Snapshots of a Daughter-in-Law, which was a much more personal work examining her female identity, reflecting the increasing tensions she experienced as a wife and mother in the 1950s, marking a substantial change in Rich's style and subject matter. In her 1982 essay "Split at the Root: An Essay on Jewish Identity", Rich states: "The experience of motherhood was eventually to radicalize me." The book met with harsh reviews. She comments, "I was seen as 'bitter' and 'personal'; and to be personal was to be disqualified, and that was very shaking because I'd really gone out on a limb ... I realised I'd gotten slapped over the wrist, and I didn't attempt that kind of thing again for a long time."

Moving her family to New York in 1966, Rich became involved with the New Left and became heavily involved in anti-war, civil rights, and feminist activism. Her husband took a teaching position at City College of New York.

In 1968, she signed the "Writers and Editors War Tax Protest" pledge, vowing to refuse tax payments in protest against the Vietnam War. Her collections from this period include Necessities of Life (1966), Leaflets (1969), and The Will to Change (1971), which reflect increasingly radical political content and interest in poetic form.

From 1967 to 1969, Rich lectured at Swarthmore College and taught at Columbia University School of the Arts as an adjunct professor in the Writing Division. Additionally, in 1968, she began teaching in the SEEK program in City College of New York, a position she continued until 1975. During this time, Rich also received the Eunice Tietjens Memorial Prize from Poetry Magazine. Rich and Conrad hosted anti-war and Black Panther fundraising parties at their apartment. Rising tensions began to split the marriage, and Rich moved out in mid-1970, getting herself a small studio apartment nearby. Shortly afterward, in October, Conrad drove into the woods and shot himself, widowing Rich.

In 1971, she was the recipient of the Shelley Memorial Award from the Poetry Society of America and spent the next year and a half teaching at Brandeis University as the Hurst visiting professor of creative writing. Diving into the Wreck, a collection of exploratory and often angry poems, split the 1974 National Book Award for Poetry with Allen Ginsberg, The Fall of America. Declining to accept it individually, Rich was joined by the two other feminist poets nominated, Alice Walker and Audre Lorde, to accept it on behalf of all women "whose voices have gone and still go unheard in a patriarchal world." The following year, Rich took up the position of the Lucy Martin Donnelly Fellow at Bryn Mawr College.

== Later life: 1976–2012 ==
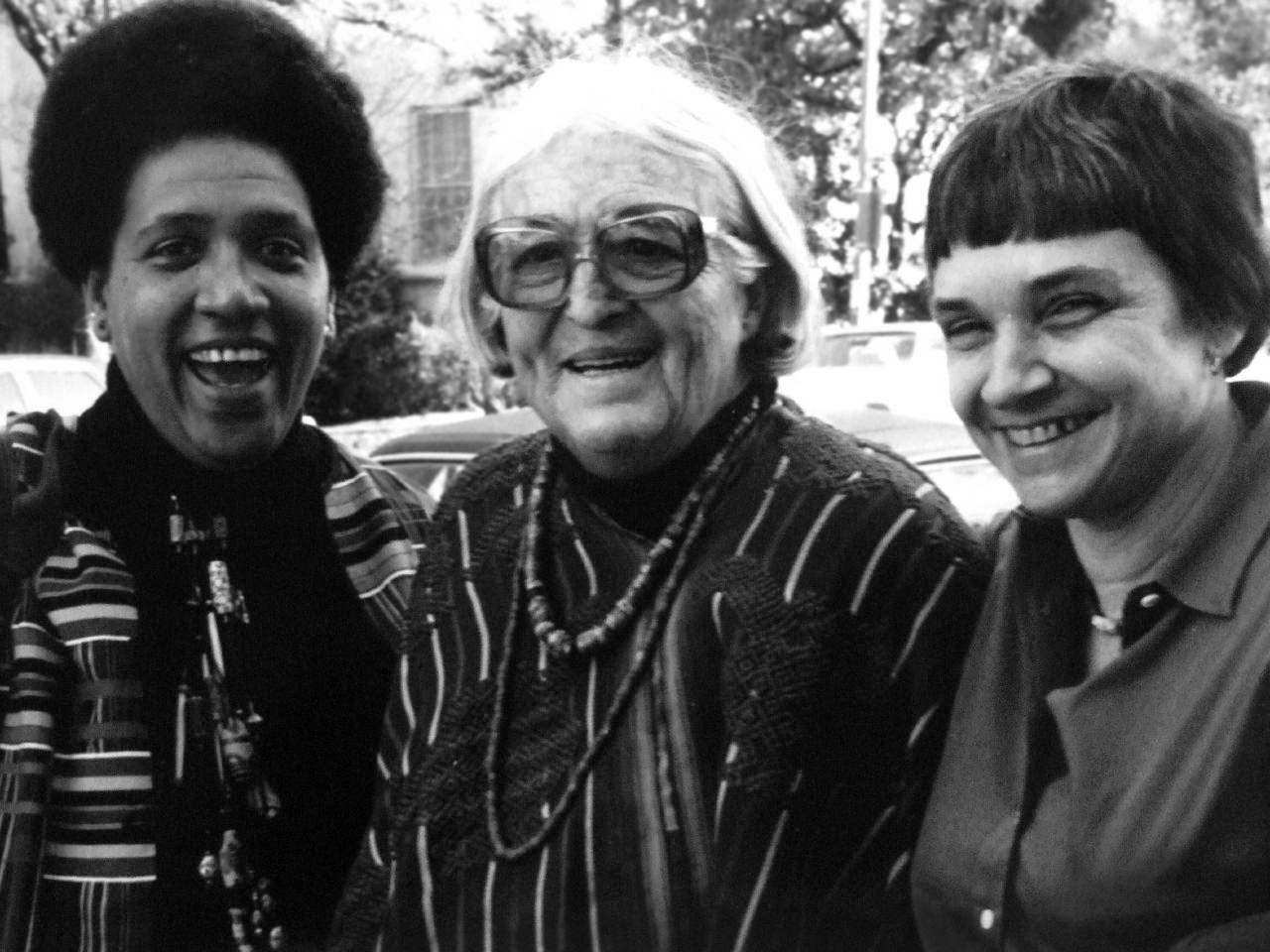
Rich (right), with writers Audre Lorde (left) and Meridel Le Sueur (middle) in Austin, Texas, 1980

In 1976, Rich began her same-sex partnership with Jamaican-born novelist and editor Michelle Cliff, which lasted until her death. In her controversial work Of Woman Born: Motherhood as Experience and Institution, published the same year, Rich acknowledged that, for her, lesbianism was a political as well as a personal issue, writing, "The suppressed lesbian I had been carrying in me since adolescence began to stretch her limbs." The pamphlet Twenty-One Love Poems (1977), which was incorporated into the following year's Dream of a Common Language (1978), marked the first direct treatment of lesbian desire and sexuality in her writing, themes which run throughout her work afterwards, especially in A Wild Patience Has Taken Me This Far (1981) and some of her late poems in The Fact of a Doorframe (2001). In her analytical work Adrienne Rich: the moment of change, Langdell suggests these works represent a central rite of passage for the poet, as she (Rich) crossed a threshold into a newly constellated life and a "new relationship with the universe". During this period, Rich also wrote a number of key socio-political essays, including "Compulsory Heterosexuality and Lesbian Existence," one of the first to address the theme of lesbian existence. In this essay, she asks "how and why women's choice of women as passionate comrades, life partners, co-workers, lovers, community, has been crushed, invalidated, forced into hiding." Some of the essays were republished in On Lies, Secrets and Silence: Selected Prose, 1966–1978 (1979). In integrating such pieces into her work, Rich claimed her sexuality and took a role in leadership for sexual equality.

From 1976 to 1979, Rich taught at City College and Rutgers University as an English professor. In 1979, she received an honorary doctorate from Smith College and moved with Cliff to Montague, MA. Ultimately, they moved to Santa Cruz, where Rich continued her career as a professor, lecturer, poet, and essayist. Rich and Cliff took over editorship of the lesbian arts journal Sinister Wisdom (1981–1983). Rich taught and lectured at UC Santa Cruz, Scripps College, San Jose State University, and Stanford University during the 1980s and 1990s. From 1981 to 1987, Rich served as an A.D. White Professor-At-Large for Cornell University. Rich published several volumes in the next few years: Your Native Land, Your Life (1986), Blood, Bread, and Poetry (1986), and Time's Power: Poems 1985–1988 (1989). She also was awarded the Ruth Paul Lilly Poetry Prize (1986), the Elmer Holmes Bobst Award in Arts and Letters from NYU, and the National Poetry Association Award for Distinguished Service to the Art of Poetry (1989).

In 1977, Rich became an associate of the Women's Institute for Freedom of the Press (WIFP). WIFP is an American nonprofit publishing organization. The organization works to increase communication between women and connect the public with forms of women-based media.

Janice Raymond, in the foreword of her 1979 book The Transsexual Empire, thanked Rich for "constant encouragement" and cited her in the book's chapter "Sappho by Surgery." The book has been criticized by a number of LGBT and feminist writers for its anti-trans stance, and many have criticized Rich for her involvement in and support of its production. While Rich never explicitly disavowed her support for Raymond's work, Leslie Feinberg cites Rich as having been supportive during Feinberg's writing of Transgender Warriors.

By the early 1980s, Rich was using canes and wheelchairs due to rheumatoid arthritis. Diagnosed with the condition at age 22, Rich kept her disability quiet for decades. The cold air in New England motivated Rich and Cliff to settle in California. A 1992 spinal operation required Rich to wear a metal halo screwed into her head.

In June 1984, Rich presented a speech at the International Conference of Women, Feminist Identity, and Society in Utrecht, Netherlands titled Notes Toward a Politics of Location. Her keynote speech is a major document on politics of location and the birth of the concept of female "locatedness." In discussing the locations from which women speak, Rich attempts to reconnect female thought and speech with the female body, with an intent to reclaim the body through verbalizing self-representation. Rich begins the speech by noting that while she speaks the words in Europe, she has searched for them in the United States. By acknowledging her location in an essay on the progression of the women's movement, she expresses her concern for all women, not just women in Providence. Through widening her audience to women across the world Rich not only influences a larger movement but she invites all women to consider their existence. Through imagining geographical locations on a map as history and as places where women are created, and further focusing on those locations, Rich asks women to examine where they were created. In an attempt to try to find a sense of belonging in the world, Rich asks the audience not to begin with a continent, country, or house, but to start with the geography closest to themselves — which is their body. Rich, therefore, challenges members of the audience and readers to form their own identity by refusing to be defined by the parameters of government, religion, and home. The essay hypothesizes the women's movement at the end of the 20th century. In an encouraging call for the women's movement, Rich discusses how the movement for change is an evolution in itself. Through de-masculinizing and de-Westernizing itself, the movement becomes a critical mass of many different voices, languages and overall actions. She pleads for the movement to change in order to experience change. She further insists that women must change it. In her essay, Rich considers how one's background might influence their identity. She furthers this notion by noting her own exploration of the body, her body, as female, as white, as Jewish and as a body in a nation. Rich is careful to define the location in which her writing takes place. Throughout her essay, Rich refers back to the concept of location. She recounts her growth towards understanding how the women's movement grounded in Western culture and limited to the concerns of white women, then incorporated verbal and written expression of black United States citizens. Such professions have allowed her to experience the meaning of her whiteness as a point of location for which she needed to take responsibility. In 1986, she published the essay in her prose collection Blood, Bread, and Poetry.

Rich's work with the New Jewish Agenda led to the founding of Bridges: A Journal for Jewish Feminists and Our Friends in 1990, a journal for which Rich served as editor. This work explored the relationship between private and public histories, especially in the case of Jewish women's rights. Her next published piece, An Atlas of the Difficult World (1991), won both the Los Angeles Times Book Award in Poetry and the Lenore Marshall/Nation Award as well as the Poet's Prize in 1993 and Commonwealth Award in Literature in 1991. During the 1990s Rich joined advisory boards such as the Boston Woman's Fund, National Writers Union and Sisterhood in Support of Sisters in South Africa. On the role of the poet, she wrote, "We may feel bitterly how little our poems can do in the face of seemingly out-of-control technological power and seemingly limitless corporate greed, yet it has always been true that poetry can break isolation, show us to ourselves when we are outlawed or made invisible, remind us of beauty where no beauty seems possible, remind us of kinship where all is represented as separation." In July 1994, Rich won the MacArthur Fellowship, the "Genius Grant" for her work as a poet and writer. Also in 1992, Rich became a grandmother to Julia Arden Conrad and Charles Reddington Conrad.

There's a place between two stands of trees where the grass grows uphill
and the old revolutionary road breaks off into shadows
near a meeting-house abandoned by the persecuted
who disappeared into those shadows.

I've walked there picking mushrooms at the edge of dread, but don't be fooled
this isn't a Russian poem, this is not somewhere else but here,
our country moving closer to its own truth and dread,
its own ways of making people disappear.

— From "What kinds of times are these?"

In 1997, Rich declined the National Medal of Arts in protest against the House of Representatives' vote to end the National Endowment for the Arts as well as policies of the Clinton Administration regarding the arts generally, and literature in particular, stating that "I could not accept such an award from President Clinton or this White House because the very meaning of art, as I understand it, is incompatible with the cynical politics of this administration ... [Art] means nothing if it simply decorates the dinner table of the power which holds it hostage." Her next few volumes were a mix of poetry and essays: Midnight Salvage: Poems 1995–1998 (1999), The Art of the Possible: Essays and Conversations (2001), and Fox: Poems 1998–2000 (2001).

In the early 2000s, Rich participated in anti-war activities, protesting against the threat of war in Iraq, both through readings of her poetry and other activities. In 2002, she was appointed a chancellor of the newly augmented board of the Academy of American Poets, along with Yusef Komunyakaa, Lucille Clifton, Jay Wright (who declined the honor), Louise Glück, Heather McHugh, Rosanna Warren, Charles Wright, Robert Creeley, and Michael Palmer. She won the 2003 Yale Bollingen Prize for American Poetry and was applauded by the panel of judges for her "honesty at once ferocious, humane, her deep learning, and her continuous poetic exploration and awareness of multiple selves." In October 2006, Equality Forum honored Rich's work, featuring her as an icon of LGBT history.

In 2009, despite initially having reservations about the movement, Rich endorsed the call for a cultural and academic boycott of Israel, denouncing "the Occupation's denial of Palestinian humanity, destruction of Palestinian lives and livelihoods, the 'settlements,' the state's physical and psychological walls against dialogue."

Rich died on March 27, 2012, at the age of 82 in her Santa Cruz, California, home. Her son, Pablo Conrad, reported that her death resulted from long-term rheumatoid arthritis. Her last collection was published the year before her death. Rich was survived by her sons, two grandchildren and her partner Michelle Cliff.

== Views ==
=== On feminism ===
Adrienne Rich wrote several pieces that address the rights of women in society. In Snapshots of a Daughter-in-Law she offered a critical analysis of the life of being both a mother and a daughter-in-law, and the impact of their gender in their lives. Diving Into the Wreck was written in the early 1970s when her tone began to darken as she wrote about feminism and other social issues. In particular, she wrote openly about her outrage at the patriarchal nature of the greater society. In doing so, she became an example for other women to follow in the hope that continued work against sexism would eventually counteract it.

Her poems are also known for their feminist elements. One such poem is "Power", about Marie Curie (a female icon of the 20th century) and her relationship to power and feminism. Curie was slowly succumbing to the radiation that she absorbed in her research; Rich refers to that radiation as Curie's source of power, while exploring the concept of power from a woman's particular point of view.

Besides poems and novels, Rich also wrote nonfiction books that tackled feminist issues, including Of Woman Born, Motherhood as Experience and Institution, and Blood, Bread and Poetry. Blood, Bread, and Poetry is a collection of essays, including "Compulsory Heterosexuality and Lesbian Existence". Some of Rich's writing is included and discussed in Feminism and Community, edited by Penny A. Weiss and Marilyn Friedman.

Her works, interviews, and documentaries demonstrated Rich's in-depth perspective on feminism and society.

Rich commented on the use of the term "feminism". She preferred "women's liberation", thinking that "feminism" was more likely to induce resistance from women of the next generation. She also feared that the term would amount to nothing more than a label if used extensively. She viewed "women's liberation" as finally being free from factors that can be seen as oppressive to women's rights.

Rich also wrote in depth about "white feminism" and the need for intersectionality within the feminist movement. In Blood, Bread, and Poetry, Rich wrote that "feminism became a political and spiritual base from which I could move to examine rather than try to hide my own racism, recognize that I have anti-racist work to do continuously within myself". She went on to write that "so long as [feminists] identify only with white women, we are still connected to that system of objectification and callousness and cruelty called racism". Rich implored white feminists to consider the fact that "[they], as victims of objectification, have objectified other women" through their role as the oppressor, and through the white privilege they inherently possess under a racist regime.

Rich's views on feminism are evident in her works. She says in Of Woman Born that "we need to understand the power and powerlessness embodied in motherhood in patriarchal culture". She also speaks regarding the need for women to unite in On Lies, Secrets and Silence:

"Women have often felt insane when cleaving to the truth of our experience. Our future depends on the sanity of each of us, and we have a profound stake, beyond the personal, in the project of describing our reality as candidly and fully as we can to each other."

Given the conditions for feminism from the 1950s through the 1970s, it can be said that Rich's works on feminism were revolutionary. Her views on equality and the need for women to maximize their potential can be seen as progressive for the time. Her views strongly coincided with feminist thinking during that period. According to Rich, society was founded on patriarchy, and limits the rights of women. She believed that for equality to be achieved between the sexes, the prevailing notions must be readjusted to accommodate the female perspective.

=== On racism ===
Rich wrote at length on the topic of white feminism and intersectionality within the feminist movement. Citing such prominent black feminist activists and academics as Gloria T. Hull, Michele Russel, Lorraine Bethel, and Toni Morrison in her works, Rich dedicated several chapters of her book Blood, Bread, and Poetry to the subject of racism. Of her essay Of Woman Born, Rich wrote that it "could have been stronger had it drawn on more of the literature by Black women toward which Toni Morrison's Sula inevitably pointed me."

Touching on the privilege conferred to her as a white feminist author, Rich wrote in Blood, Bread, and Poetry that she "is probably going to be taken more seriously in some quarters than the Black woman scholar whose combined experience and research give her far more penetrating knowledge and awareness than mine. I will be taken more seriously because I am white, [..] and because the invisibility of the woman of color who is the scholar/critic or the poet or the novelist is part of the structure of my privilege, even my credibility."

In 1981, Rich co-presented the keynote address for the National Women's Studies Association Convention in Storrs, Connecticut, along with Audre Lorde, delivering her speech entitled "Disobedience is What NWSA is Potentially About." The theme of the convention was "Women Respond to Racism", and Rich noted the homophobia and racism that still existed "in the enclave of Women's studies itself, where lesbians are still feared and women of color are still ignored". Rich went on to say that "women of color who are found in the wrong place as defined at any given time by the white fathers will receive their retribution unseen: if they are beaten, raped, insulted, harassed, mutilated, murdered, these events will go unreported, unpunished, unconnected; and white women are not even supposed to know they occur, let alone identify with the sufferings endured." Rich asked the audience: "how disobedient will Women's Studies be in the 1980s; how will this Association address the racism, misogyny, homophobia of the university and of the corporate and militist society in which it is embedded; how will white feminist scholars and teachers and students practice disobedience to patriarchy?" Rich implored the audience to rid themselves of the idea that "by opposing racist violence, by doing anti-racist work, or by becoming feminists white women somehow cease to carry racism within them", asserting that white women are never absolved of their white privilege and must continually commit to anti-racist work while they are still in the role of the oppressor.

In 2009, Rich came forward with a statement in support of the U.S. Campaign for the Academic and Cultural Boycott of Israel (USACBI), criticizing Israeli occupation and expressing her “continued solidarity with the Palestinian people’s long resistance.”

== Selected awards and honors ==
Each year links to its corresponding "[year]() in poetry" article:

- 1950: Yale Younger Poets Award for A Change of World.
- 1952: Guggenheim Fellowship
- 1960: National Institute of Arts and Letters Award
- 1970: Shelley Memorial Award
- 1974: National Book Award for Poetry (a split award) for Diving into the Wreck
- 1979: Honorary Doctorate Smith College
- 1986: Inaugural Ruth Lilly Poetry Prize
- 1989: Honorary doctorate from Harvard University
- 1989: National Poetry Association Award for Distinguished Service to the Art of Poetry
- 1990: Bill Whitehead Award for Lifetime Achievement (for gay or lesbian writing)
- 1991: Common Wealth Award of Distinguished Service
- 1991: Fellow of the American Academy of Arts and Sciences
- 1992: Lenore Marshall Poetry Prize
- 1992: Poets' Prize for Atlas of the Difficult World
- 1992: Frost Medal
- 1992: Academy of American Poets Fellowship
- 1994: MacArthur Fellowship
- 1996: Wallace Stevens Award
- 1997: National Medal of Arts (refused)
- 1999: Lifetime Achievement Award from the Lannan Foundation
- 2006: National Book Foundation Medal for Distinguished Contribution to American Letters
- 2006: David R Kessler Award for LGBTQ Studies, CLAGS: The Center for LGBTQ Studies
- 2010: Lifetime Recognition Award from the Griffin Poetry Prize
- 2017: Finalist, Pulitzer Prize for Poetry (posthumous)
- 2019: In June 2019, Rich was one of the inaugural fifty American "pioneers, trailblazers, and heroes" inducted on the National LGBTQ Wall of Honor within the Stonewall National Monument (SNM) in New York City's Stonewall Inn. The SNM is the first U.S. national monument dedicated to LGBTQ rights and history, and the wall's unveiling was timed to take place during the 50th anniversary of the Stonewall riots.

== Literary works ==
=== Nonfiction ===
- 1972: When We Dead Awaken: Writing as Re-Vision. College English.
- 1976: Of Woman Born: Motherhood as Experience & Institution. Norton. 1995. ISBN 978-0-393-31284-3.
- 1979: On Lies, Secrets and Silence: Selected Prose, 1966–1978
- 1986: Blood, Bread, and Poetry: Selected Prose, 1979–1985 (Includes the noted essay: "Compulsory Heterosexuality and Lesbian Existence")
- 1993: What Is Found There: Notebooks on Poetry and Politics
- 1995: If Not with Others, How? pp. 399–405 in Weiss, Penny A.; Friedman, Marilyn (1995). Feminism and community. Philadelphia: Temple University Press. ISBN 9781566392761.
- 2001: Arts of the Possible: Essays and Conversations. W.W. Norton. 2001. ISBN 978-0-393-05045-5.
- 2007: Poetry and Commitment: An Essay
- 2009: A Human Eye: Essays on Art in Society, 1997–2008
- 2018: Essential Essays: Culture, Politics, and the Art of Poetry, W.W. Norton, 2018 ISBN 9780393652369

=== Poetry ===
==== Collections ====
- 1951: A Change of World. Yale University Press.
- 1955: The Diamond Cutters, and Other Poems. Harper.
- 1963: Snapshots of a daughter-in-law: poems, 1954–1962. Harper & Row.
- 1966: Necessities of life: poems, 1962–1965. W.W. Norton.
- 1967: Selected Poems. Chatto & Hogarth P Windus.
- 1969: Leaflets. W.W. Norton. 1981 [1969]. ISBN 978-0-03-930419-5.
- 1971: The Will to Change: Poems 1968-1970. Norton. 1971.
- 1973: Diving into the Wreck. W.W. Norton. 1994. ISBN 978-0-393-31163-1.
- 1975: Poems: Selected and New, 1950-1974. Norton. 1974. ISBN 978-0-393-04392-1.
- 1976: Twenty-one Love Poems. Effie's Press.
- 1978: The Dream of a Common Language. Norton. 1978. ISBN 978-0-393-04502-4.
- 1982: A Wild Patience Has Taken Me this Far: Poems 1978-1981. W. W. Norton & Company, Incorporated. 1981. ISBN 978-0-393-31037-5. (reprint 1993)
- 1983: Sources. Heyeck Press.
- 1984: The Fact of a Doorframe: Poems Selected and New, 1950-1984. W. W. Norton & Company, Incorporated. 1994. ISBN 978-0-393-31075-7.
- 1986: Your Native Land, Your Life: Poems. Norton. 1986. ISBN 978-0-393-02318-3.
- 1989: Time's Power: Poems, 1985-1988. Norton. 1989. ISBN 978-0-393-02677-1.
- 1991: An Atlas of the Difficult World: Poems 1988-1991. Norton. 1991. ISBN 978-0-393-03069-3.
- 1993: Collected Early Poems, 1950-1970. W. W. Norton & Company, Incorporated. 1993. ISBN 978-0-393-31385-7.
- 1995: Dark Fields of the Republic: Poems, 1991-1995. W.W. Norton. 1995. ISBN 978-0-393-03868-2.
- 1996: Selected poems, 1950-1995. Salmon Pub. January 1996. ISBN 978-1-897648-78-0.
- 1999: Midnight Salvage: Poems, 1995-1998. Norton. 1999. ISBN 978-0-393-04682-3.
- 2001: Fox: Poems 1998-2000. W W Norton & Co Inc. March 17, 2003. ISBN 978-0-393-32377-1. (reprint 2003)
- 2004: The School Among the Ruins: Poems, 2000-2004. W. W. Norton & Co. 2004. ISBN 978-0-393-32755-7.
- 2007: Rich, Adrienne Cecile (2007). Telephone Ringing in the Labyrinth: Poems 2004–2006. W.W. Norton. ISBN 978-0-393-06565-7.
- 2010: Rich, Adrienne (2011). Tonight No Poetry Will Serve: Poems 2007-2010. W. W. Norton & Company. ISBN 978-0-393-07967-8.
- 2016: Rich, Adrienne (2016). Collected Poems 1950-2012. W.W. Norton. ISBN 978-0-393-28511-6.

== See also ==
- American philosophy
- List of American philosophers
- Lesbian Poetry
