= Mildred Cooke =

English noblewoman and translator

The Right Honourable The Lady Burghley
- Effigies of Mildred, Lady Burghley, and her daughter, Anne, Countess of Oxford, in Westminster Abbey
- Born: 1526
- Died: 4 April 1589 (aged 62–63); Cecil House, Strand, London
- Burial place: Westminster Abbey, London
- Known for: translator
- Title: Lady Burghley
- Spouse: William Cecil, 1st Baron Burghley (m. 1546)
- Children: Francisca Cecil; Anne Cecil, Countess of Oxford; William Cecil; William Cecil (again); Robert Cecil, 1st Earl of Salisbury; Elizabeth Cecil
- Parent(s): Sir Anthony Cooke; Anne Fitzwilliam

Mildred Cecil, Baroness Burghley (née Cooke; 1526 – 4 April 1589) was an English noblewoman and translator. She was the wife of William Cecil, 1st Baron Burghley, the most trusted adviser of Elizabeth I, and the mother of Robert Cecil, 1st Earl of Salisbury, adviser to James I.

== Family ==
Mildred Cooke, born in 1526, was the eldest of the five daughters of Sir Anthony Cooke (d. 11 June 1576), son of John Cooke (d. 10 October 1515), esquire, of Gidea Hall, Essex, and Alice Saunders (d. 1510), daughter and coheiress of William Saunders of Banbury, Oxfordshire by Jane Spencer, daughter of John Spencer, esquire, of Hodnell, Warwickshire. Her paternal great-grandparents were Sir Philip Cooke (d. 7 December 1503) and Elizabeth Belknap (died c. 6 March 1504). Her paternal great-great-grandparents were Sir Thomas Cooke, a wealthy member of the Worshipful Company of Drapers and Lord Mayor of London in 1462–3, and Elizabeth Malpas, daughter of Philip Malpas, Master of the Worshipful Company of Drapers and Sheriff of London.

Mildred Cooke's mother was Anne Fitzwilliam, the daughter of Sir William Fitzwilliam, Master of the Worshipful Company of Merchant Taylors and Sheriff of London, by his first wife, Anne Hawes, daughter of Sir John Hawes.

She had four brothers, Anthony, Sir Richard, Edward and William, and four sisters, three of whom were also known for their scholarship: Anne Cooke, who married, as his second wife, Sir Nicholas Bacon; Catherine Cooke, who married Sir Henry Killigrew; Elizabeth Cooke, who married firstly Sir Thomas Hoby and secondly John, Lord Russell (c.1553–1584), second son of Francis Russell, 2nd Earl of Bedford and first wife Margaret St John (1533–1562), daughter of Sir John St John (great-grandson of Margaret Beauchamp of Bletso) and Margaret Walgrave.

== Career ==
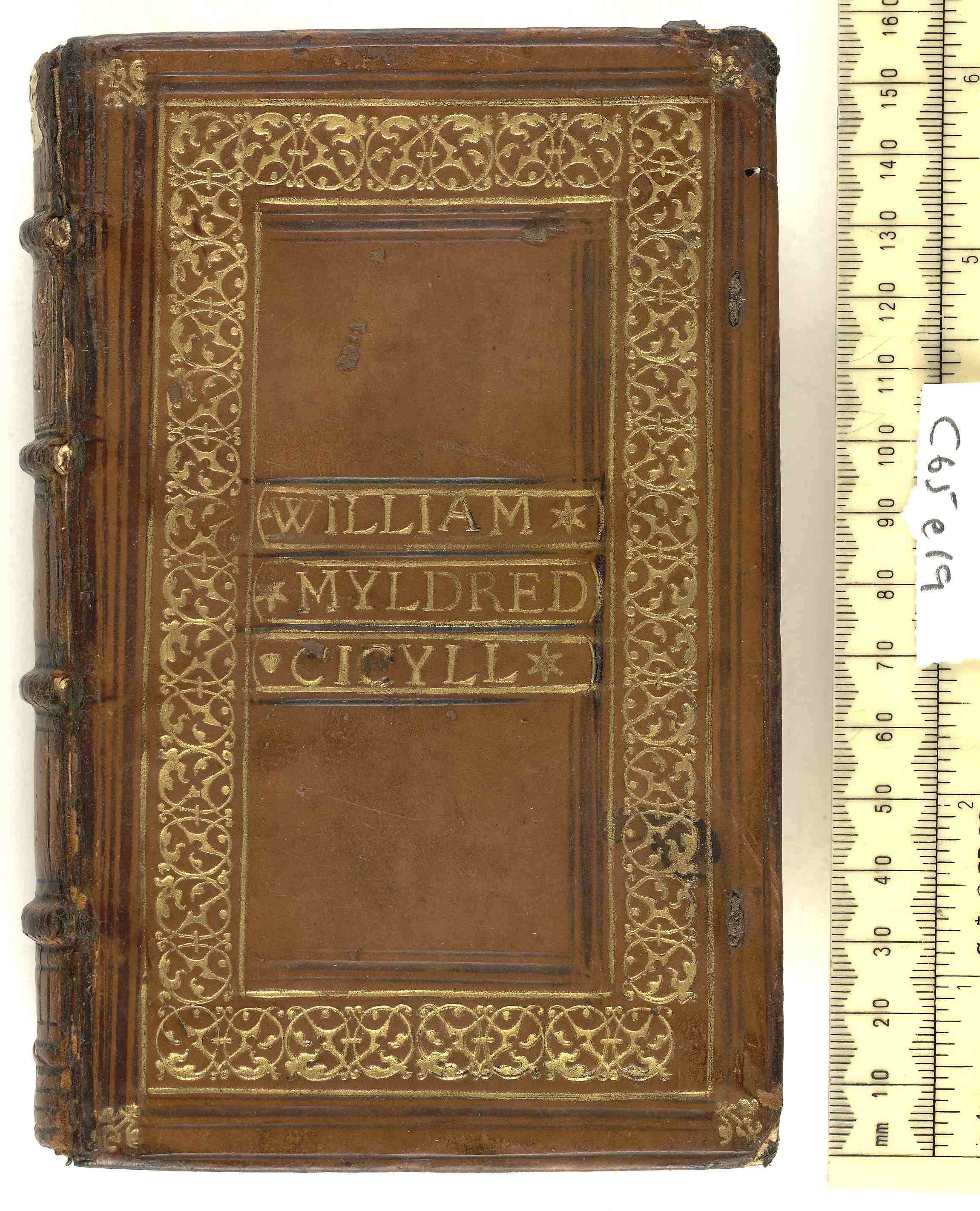
Basilii Magni et Gregorii Nazanzeni in the British Library - this copy belonged to Lord and Lady Burghley, the names 'William. Myldred Cicyll' are stamped on the cover and the titlepage bears the autograph 'Mildred: Cecili'

According to Caroline Bowden, she was educated at home by her father, Sir Anthony Cooke, who provided his five daughters with an education equal to that afforded to his sons. In 1559 William Bercher attested to their learning in his Nobility of Women. John Strype lauded her ability to speak Greek as easily as English, and Roger Ascham, tutor to the future Elizabeth I, ranked Mildred Cooke and her sisters alongside Lady Jane Grey for their erudition.

She served briefly at court as a lady of the privy chamber when Elizabeth I came to the throne in 1558.

She had charge of her children's education, as well as that of the various royal wards for whom her husband was responsible, including Edward de Vere, 17th Earl of Oxford, whom her daughter Anne eventually married. Robert Devereux, 2nd Earl of Essex was the ward of William Cecil. The Burghley household was one in which learning was valued:

Unlike Dudley [Cecil] was a scholar, a lover of books, and a man of great intellectual curiosity. He and his wife Mildred...had their children tutored to a high degree of erudition, and in their house Classical studies, philosophy and science, and at least certain kinds of poetry and music could seek refuge. Indeed, Cecil House was England’s nearest equivalent of a humanist salon since the days of More.

Lord Burghley went on to become Elizabeth I's most trusted adviser, and he and Lady Burghley entertained the queen on several occasions at their residences, including Theobalds. As the wife of the queen's chief adviser, Lady Burghley exercised influence in various ways, a circumstance that was recognized by the Spanish ambassador Guzman da Silva in 1567. While negotiations were ongoing for a marriage between the queen and Charles II, Archduke of Austria, Guzman wrote to Philip II that:

Cecil desires this business so greatly that he does not speak about the religious point, but this may be deceit as his wife is of a contrary opinion, and thinks that great trouble may be caused to the peace of the country through it. She has great influence with her husband, and no doubt discusses the matter with him; but she appears a much more furious heretic than he is.

In 1560 three Scottish leaders corresponded with her regarding the Treaty of Edinburgh then being negotiated. In 1573 she wrote in Latin to her cousin, Sir William Fitzwilliam, Lord Deputy of Ireland, offering advice. In 1580 she was given £250 for having acted as an intermediary for a suitor petitioning her husband.

Three books were dedicated to her during her lifetime:

- Thomas Drant's A Medicinable Moral, that is, Two Books of Horace His Satires (London, 1566)
- Ulpian Fulwell's The First Part of the Eighth Liberal Science Entitled Ars Adulandi (London, 1576)
- Christopher Ockland's Eirenarchi siue Elizabetha (London, 1582)

Lady Burghley did not publish her own translations, however, and few survive in manuscript. One that is extant is her translation dating from about 1550, circulated in manuscript, of Basil the Great's sermon on Deuteronomy, which she dedicated to Anne, Duchess of Somerset, in whose household she had served before her marriage. She also translated a work by John Chrysostom, which has not survived.

In his will Lady Burghley's father, Sir Anthony Cooke, left her only three books; however she built up 'an impressive library mainly in Latin and Greek', described by Bowden as 'one of the finest private libraries of the day'. More than thirty books inscribed with her name are still extant, seventeen of them at Hatfield House. Her library included works in Greek, Latin, French, and English on a wide range of topics including history, literature, medicine, and theology, many of them printed on the continent.

In 1580 she presented a polyglot Bible to St John's College, Cambridge, according to one source accompanied by a letter in her own hand written in Greek. In 1587 she presented eight volumes by Galen, five in Greek and three in Latin, to Christ Church, Oxford. She later gave two books to St John's College, Oxford, and two books to Westminster School.

She provided an exhibition for two scholars and four quarterly sermons at St John's College, Cambridge, Lord Burghley's old college.

Lady Burghley died on 4 April 1589 after 43 years of marriage. She was buried with her daughter, Anne Cecil, Countess of Oxford, in Westminster Abbey, where an enormous Corinthian tomb 24 feet high was erected. Lady Burghley is depicted lying on a sarcophagus. At her head are her three granddaughters, Elizabeth de Vere, Bridget de Vere, and Susan de Vere, and at her feet her only son, Robert Cecil. In a recess is the recumbent figure of her daughter Anne, Countess of Oxford. In the upper storey Lord Burghley is depicted kneeling in his robes. A long Latin inscription composed by Lord Burghley describes his eyes dim with tears for those who were dear to him beyond the whole race of womankind. Lord Burghley lay in state here, but was buried at St Martin's Church, Stamford.

After her death, Lord Burghley wrote a Meditation of the Death of His Lady, which is among the Lansdowne manuscripts at the British Library (C III 51), recounting, among other things, the charitable works which she had kept secret from him during her lifetime.

There are two known portraits of Lady Burghley, both at Hatfield House; one shows her during a pregnancy, probably that of 1563. The artist has been called "the Master of Mildred Cooke", but both portraits have recently been attributed to Hans Eworth.

== Marriage and issue ==
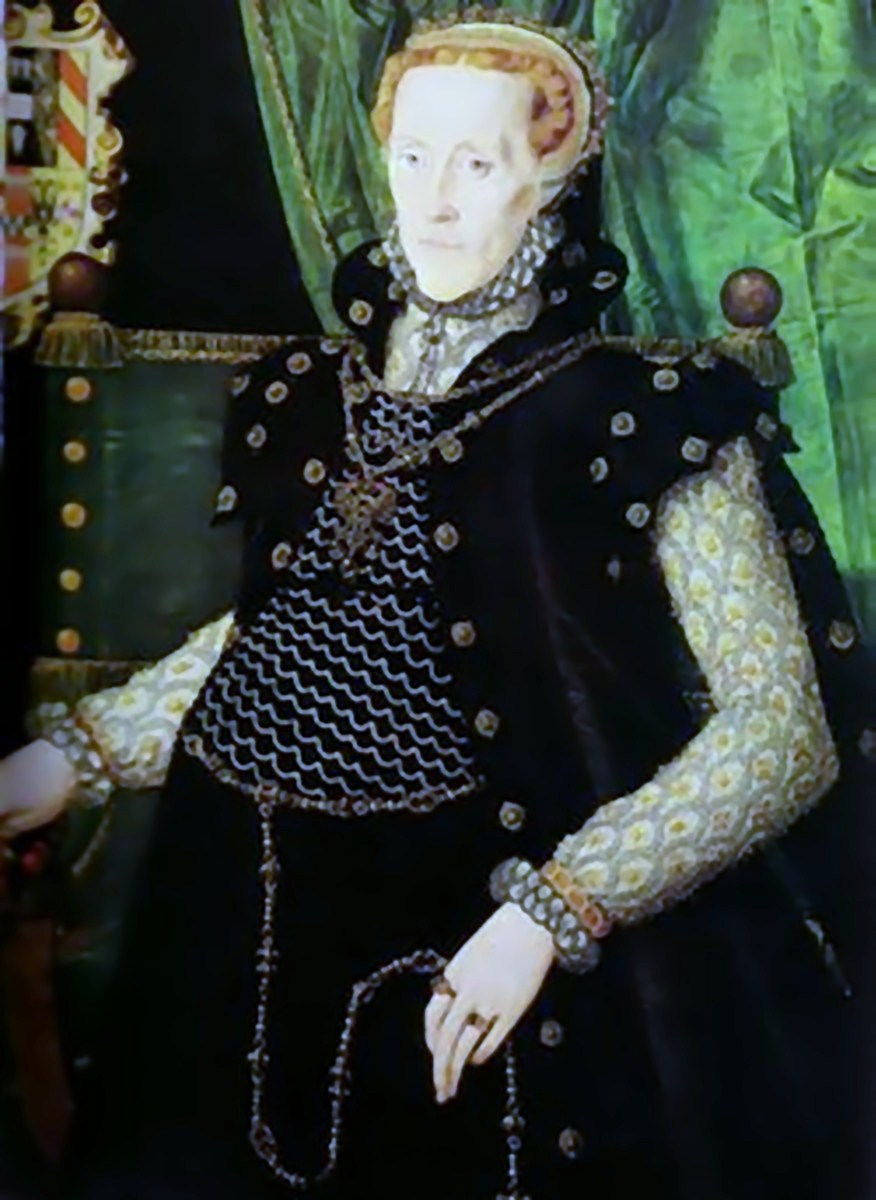
Portrait of Mildred Cooke Cecil (pregnant with Robert), by Hans Eworth, 1563, Hatfield House

In December 1545 she married William Cecil as his second wife. Their first child, a daughter, Francisca, was born in 1554, nine years after their marriage, but did not long survive. A second daughter, Anne, was born in 1556, and married, as his first wife, Edward de Vere, 17th Earl of Oxford. Two sons, both named William, died shortly after their respective births in 1559 and 1561. In 1563 a third son was born, Robert, who succeeded his father at court and was created Earl of Salisbury by James I. Another daughter, Elizabeth (born 1 July 1564), who married William Wentworth of Nettlestead (c. 1555–1582), eldest son of Thomas Wentworth, 2nd Baron Wentworth, but both she and her husband died shortly afterward without issue.

Lady Burghley died 1589 and is buried alongside her daughter Anne, Lady Oxford, in Westminster Abbey.
