= Richard Cooke (MP for Lymington) =

English politician

Sir Richard Cooke (1561 in Great Linford, Buckinghamshire – 1616), was an English-born politician who spent most of his career in Ireland. He was Chancellor of the Exchequer of Ireland, Secretary of State for Ireland, a Privy Councillor and a Member of Parliament.

He was the son of William Cooke and Frances Grey, daughter of Lord John Grey and Mary Browne, and grandson of Sir Anthony Cooke, of Gidea Hall and Anne Fitzwilliam. Educated at Oxford University, his rise in politics was mainly due to his family connection to William Cecil, 1st Baron Burghley, who had married his aunt, Mildred Cooke. He sat in the Parliament of 1584 as a member for Lymington. As an MP he was embarrassed by a lawsuit brought against him in the Court of Chancery by Margery Dyke, but he was able to plead Parliamentary privilege to defeat her claim. Margery later apologised to Cooke for making an unfounded claim.

He was granted 2,000 acres of escheated lands in County Wexford and the Manor of Dunshaughlin in County Meath. His descendants lived mainly at Sleanagrane, County Wexford, which they renamed Cookestown.

He first came to Ireland in about 1595, and became Chancellor of the Exchequer the following year. In 1602 he complained that Patrick Segrave, a Baron of the Court of Exchequer (Ireland), had tried to bribe him: Segrave was found guilty of corruption and removed from office. Cooke became Secretary of State the following year. By 1608 Cooke was considered to be a leading figure in the Irish administration. Notwithstanding his important role in Government, he preferred to live in England, where he spent most of the years 1612–1614. He only returned to Ireland under threat of removal from office. In 1615 he was writing to the London government complaining about the maladministration of Ireland, and urging that the Irish Parliament be dissolved. He died a year later. His will has not survived.

He married Anne, daughter and co-heiress of Sir Christopher Peyton (d. 1612), Auditor-General of Ireland, and his first wife Anne Palmer. After his death Anne remarried Sir Henry Colley (d. 1637), of Castle Carbury, grandson of Sir Henry Colley. Cooke was the father of Sir Walsingham Cooke of Tomduffe, High Sheriff of Wexford, and a younger son William.

His descendants included the writer and businessman John Walsingham Cooke Meredith (1809-1881). His widow and her second husband were ancestors of the Duke of Wellington.

Political offices
| Preceded by Philip Williams | Chief Secretary for Ireland; 1594–1597 | Succeeded by Philip Williams |
