= Anne Bacon =

English scholar (1528 – 1610)

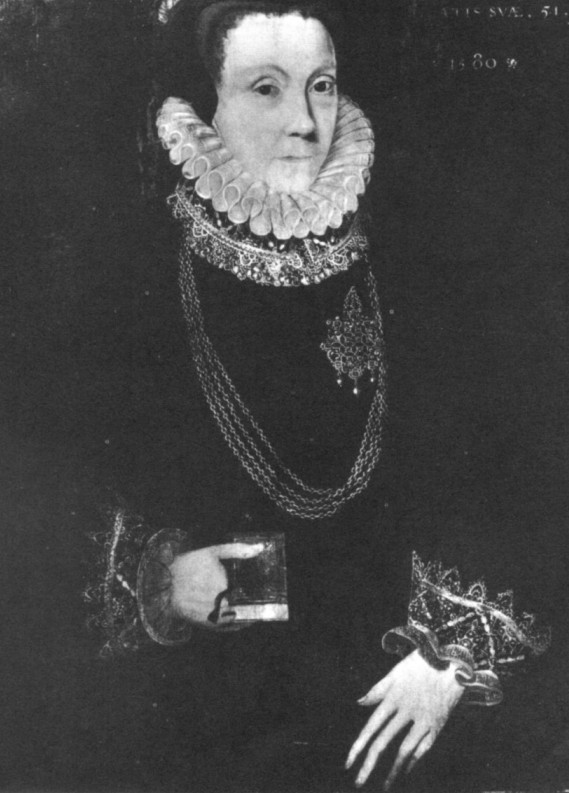
- Portrait of Lady Anne Bacon, 1580. Attributed to George Gower
- Born: c. 1528; Gidea Hall, Essex, England
- Died: 27 August 1610
- Burial place: St Michael's Church, St Albans, Hertfordshire, England
- Spouse: Nicholas Bacon (m. 1553)
- Children: Anthony Bacon, Francis Bacon
- Father: Anthony Cooke
- Relatives: William Cooke (died 1589) (brother); Mildred Cooke (sister); Elizabeth Cooke, Lady Russell (sister); Lady Catherine Killigrew; Richard Cooke) (brother)

Anne, Lady Bacon (née Cooke; 1528 – 27 August 1610) was an English lady and scholar. She made a lasting contribution to English religious literature with her translation from Latin of John Jewel's Apologie of the Anglican Church (1564). She was the mother of Francis Bacon.

== Early life ==
Anne or Ann Bacon (née Cooke) was an English translator and lady of the British court. Though Anne's exact date of birth is not known, it is presumed she was born in or around 1528. Anne was born at Gidea Hall in Essex, England. She was one of the five daughters of Anthony Cooke, tutor to Henry VIII's only son Edward, and his wife Mary, a daughter of a London merchant tailor Sir William Fitzwilliam.

Being an educator, Anthony ensured that all of his four sons and five daughters received a humanist education, with in-depth studies in languages and the classics. From the success of not just Anne, but Anthony's other daughters, this thorough education is quite evident. Anne was trained in Latin, Italian, French, Greek, and possibly Hebrew. Her sister the Lady Elizabeth Hoby was trained in languages and is also well known for similar translations and texts. Her family's social status was high, in part because her father worked so closely with the Tudor royal family, and were large landowners as a result. They had an association of some sort with Stratford though what precisely this association was remains unspecified.

=== Adult life ===
A deeply religious woman, Anne's main works are religious centred. Anne was passionate about her religion, which can be seen in the letters she wrote to her sons, Anthony Bacon and Sir Francis Bacon. Due to her education, she wrote many letters to clergymen and debated theology with them as well, however, the letters to her sons are more concerned with their well-being both in mind, body, and spirit. At twenty-two, she translated Bernardino Ochino's sermons from the Italian. Her 1564 translation from the Latin of Bishop John Jewel's Apology for the Church of England was a significant step in the intellectual justification of Protestantism in England. The work was a clarification of the differences between Anglicanism and Roman Catholicism, and was critical to the support of Elizabeth I's religious policies.

== Marriage ==
Anne Cooke married Sir Nicholas Bacon, Queen Elizabeth's Keeper of the Great Seal, in February 1553. They had two sons, Anthony and Francis Bacon, the latter later becoming a philosopher and a pioneer of the Scientific Revolution.

When Edward VI died, Anne Bacon rode to Kenninghall in Norfolk as a show of support for Mary I. The couple conformed to Mary's revival of the Roman Catholic religion. She attended the Royal Entry at Mary's coronation, listed as "Mrs Bacon" riding among the gentlewomen, maids, and chamberers. For a while, Anne Bacon was a leading Lady-in-Waiting to Elizabeth I. Her religious views remained strongly Puritan, and she called for the eradication of all Popery in the Church of England.

Anne wrote many letters, fervent with her passion for her Protestant beliefs. Many of her later letters were addressed to her sons, Anthony and Francis. Her letters to her sons are said to express "the jealousy with which she regarded her authority over them long after they had reached manhood", and being concerned with their spiritual welfare. In the letters she also demands they follow her wishes, scorns them when they disregard her wishes, and expects her sons to update her quite thoroughly on their day-to-day lives. Though these demands she makes are true, sources agree, her main concern was their spiritual welfare, and their religious lives. She also sent medical advice, recommending the use of leeches for gout.

In a letter from Anne to Francis Bacon, she addresses her views of the church and government, speaking knowledgeably and elegantly. She addresses her son, and though the letter is quite formal and written in flowery vocabulary, her emotions and love for her religion and her son come through. She expresses her desires that he be a good man. She wrote to clergymen, including Anglican Bishop Godfrey Goodman. In her letters she quoted classical Greek and Latin authors.

Long after her death, Bishop Goodman wrote that Anne was "little better than frantic in her age", and so it seems she lived out of the spotlight before her death in 1610. This is a portion of Anne's life where we can find little information. Her later years seem to be somewhat of a mystery, as she wrote few letters, and participated in few events at court.

On 27 August 1610, Francis Bacon wrote to his mother's friend Sir Michael Hicks, inviting him to her funeral. Her exact date of passing is not precisely known. She died at about the age of 82 and was entombed in St Michael's Church in St Albans. Her second son, Sir Francis Bacon is buried there as well, per his request to be near his mother.

== Works ==
- Sermons of Barnardine Ochyne, (to the number of 25.) concerning the predestination and election of god: very expedient to the setting forth of his glory among his creatures.
- An apologie or answere in defence of the Churche of Englande, with a briefe and plaine declaration of the true religion professed and used in the same.
