= Romford Garden Suburb =

Housing estate in London, England

Coordinates: 51°35′24″N 00°11′33″E

- Romford Garden Suburb map, 1910

- Location within Greater London
- London borough: Havering
- Ceremonial county: Greater London
- Region: London
- Country: England
- Sovereign state: United Kingdom
- Post town: LONDON
- Postcode district: RM2
- Dialling code: 01708
- Police: Metropolitan
- Fire: London
- Ambulance: London
- UK Parliament: Romford
- London Assembly: Havering and Redbridge

Romford Garden Suburb (otherwise known as the Gidea Park Exhibition Estate), is a late-Edwardian housing development in Gidea Park, in the London Borough of Havering. The object of the new suburb, which was built on land belonging to Gidea Hall, then occupied by the Liberal politician Herbert Raphael, was, according to his parliamentary colleague John Burns, to "provide families with a well-built, modern home regardless of class or status" and "to bring the towns into the country and the country into the towns".

The garden suburb was conceived to be an example of early 20th-century domestic architecture and town planning. They were popular in Edwardian England; Hampstead Garden Suburb, established by Henrietta Barnett in 1906, was one example. The garden suburb at Romford comprised 159 fully-furnished houses and cottages each funded by the architects who designed them, in either the Arts and Crafts or Art Nouveau styles. Upon completion an exhibition was organised to showcase the dwellings for prospective buyers and a competition was held to find the best building, with a first prize of £250 and a gold medal being awarded to the winning architect. The best detached houses were awarded Class I status, which would allow the property to be sold for £500, while Class II buildings were marketed for £375. The buildings were judged on their utility and economy of management and maintenance.

One hundred architects and urban planners took part in the Gidea Park development, including William Curtis Green, Philip Tilden, Raymond Unwin, Richard Barry Parker, Clough Williams-Ellis, George Val Myer, Geoffry Lucas and Baillie Scott. The exhibition opened in the spring of 1911 and with it came the establishment of several roads, including Balgores Lane, Squirrels Heath Avenue and Crossways to the south of Hare Street (now Main Road) and Heath Drive, Meadway, Reed Pond Walk, Heaton Grange Road, Risebridge Road and Parkway to the north. In 1934, using land left over from the first competition, a second exhibition was held, this time hosted by Raphael's nephew, Major Ralph Raphael MC. These houses were designed in the English vernacular style, the dominant architectural fashion for low density housing. Six of the 1911 exhibition houses were later designated as Grade II listed buildings by Historic England. The suburb was designated as a conservation area in 1970. The winner of the 1934 competition, 64 Heath Drive, by Francis Skinner, a founding member of Berthold Lubetkin's Tecton Group, was also listed at Grade II in 1997.

== History ==
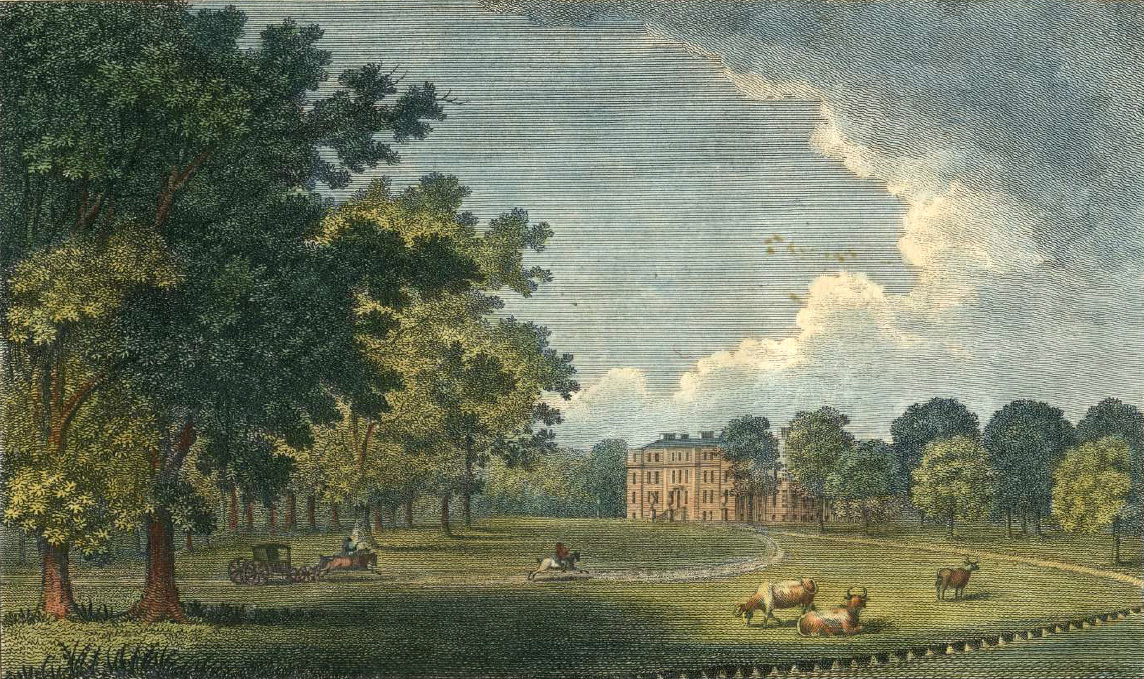
An engraving of the Gidea Hall estate, by Humphrey Repton, 1797

Thomas Cooke, a Yorkshireman who became London Mayor in 1462, was granted a Royal Charter for Havering-atte-Bower. This enabled him to build a country house, which he named "Geddy Hall". The word "geddy" derived from the lake and its livestock; ged, meaning pike, and ea (water). The house remained unfinished for at least a century because of his numerous incarcerations within the Tower of London for High Treason. Upon his death in 1478, the estate was passed down through the Cooke family and eventually to his great-grandson, Anthony Cooke, tutor for Edward VI, in October 1579.

After a brief period abroad, Anthony returned to Havering-atte-Bower and completed the building of Geddy Hall, which became Gidea Hall. In 1657, the hall and its grounds were sold to Richard Emes, a local businessman, for £9,000. Upon the Restoration in 1660, the estate was bought back by the Crown and passed through the ownerships of various nobilities; it was eventually sold through public auction, before the Coronation of Queen Victoria. Gidea Hall sold to the Black family in 1802 under whose ownership it remained until 1883 when it was bought for redevelopment by a company that was associated with Jabez Balfour. The company was unsuccessful in its plans and in 1893, Gidea Hall was again put up for sale.

The English landscape designer Humphry Repton designed a small hamlet in Gidea Park and lived there in the early 1800s in a small cottage, out of which he worked, adjacent to Balgores Lane at the junction of, what was then, Hare Street. The cottage survived until the 1960s when it was demolished to make way for a bank.

== Planning ==
Sir Herbert Raphael, vice-president of the Romford Garden Suburb House and Cottage Exhibition Committee, and upon whose land the garden suburb was built

The Liberal Member of parliament, Herbert Raphael, purchased Gidea Hall, Romford, in 1897. It came set within 150 acres (610,000 m^{2}) and Raphael purchased a further 480 acres (1,900,000 m^{2}), which he divided up, giving 20 acres (81,000 m^{2}), which included a lake, for use as a public park; Raphael lent his name to it in 1904. He formed the idea for a garden suburb after the construction of Hampstead Garden Suburb, which was established by Henrietta Barnett in 1906 on land purchased from Eton College. Barnett had set up the Hampstead Garden Suburb Trust Ltd and appointed Barry Parker and Raymond Unwin as its chief architects.

Raphael decided to capitalise on the success seen at Hampstead and other garden suburbs, such as at Ealing, Tottenham and Tooting, and set about organising an exhibition at Gidea Park. In 1909 Raphael enlisted the help of John Tudor Walters, an architect and surveyor, and Charles McCurdy, who had been a director for the Hampstead Garden Suburb Trust, to set up the Gidea Hall Development Company, (Note: The Gidea Hall Development Company later became Gidea Park Ltd.) the head office for which was based at 33 Henrietta Street, in Covent Garden, London. Raphael designated 450 acres (1,800,000 m^{2}) to the building of the garden suburb, on the west side of the Gidea Hall estate; to the east, 90 acres (360,000 m^{2}) was used to establish a golf course. Each acre within the suburb area was to contain no more than six dwellings.

=== House and Cottage Exhibition Committee ===
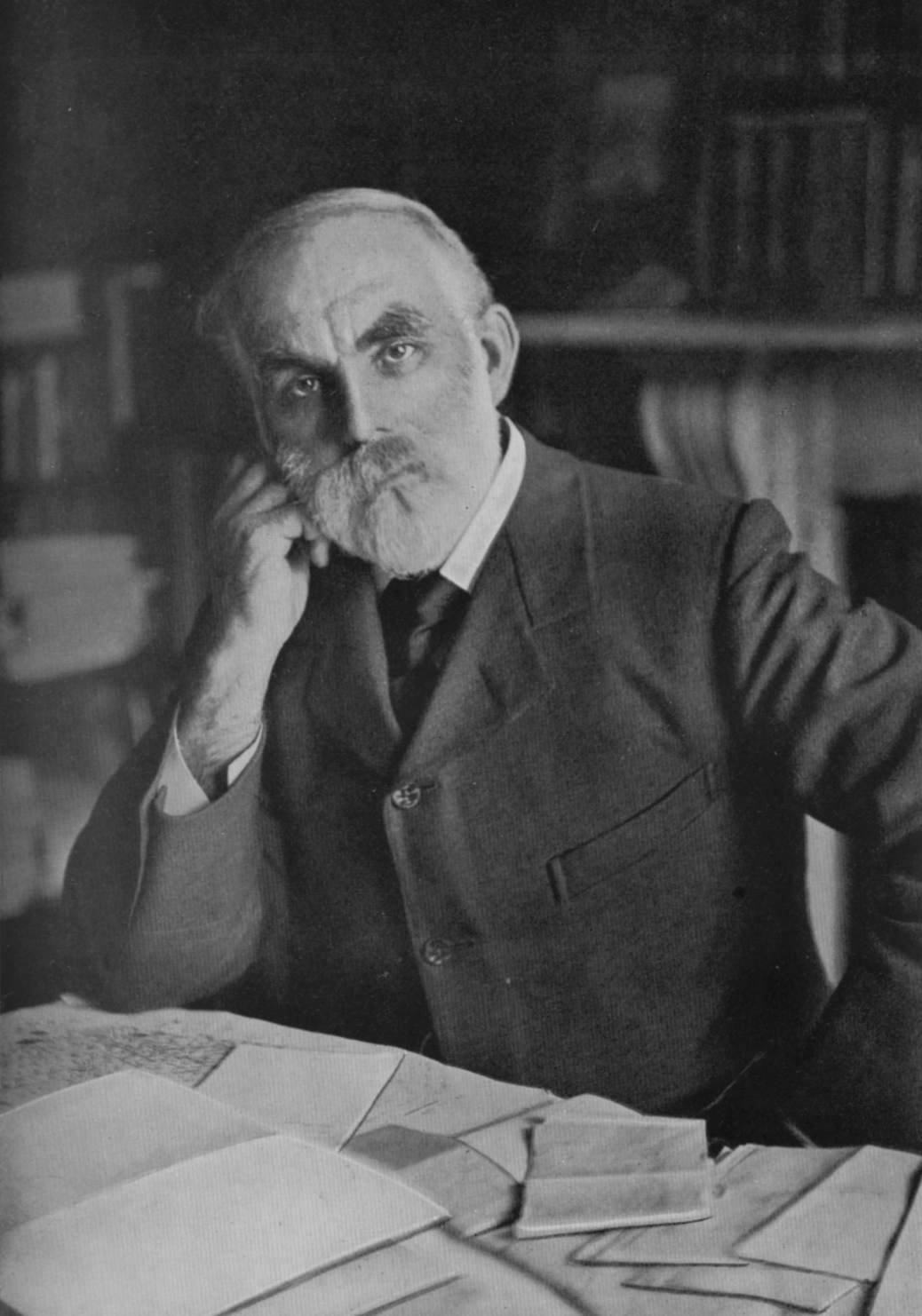
John Burns, president of the House and Cottage Exhibition Committee

For the suburb layout, the judges handled 323 plans from architects all over the country who wished to take part. First prize and £100 was awarded to W. Garnett Gibson and Reginald Dann. For the dwellings, they received 2000 applications from interested architects, with 100 being selected by the judges, Guy Dawber, H. V. Lanchester, and Mervyn Macartney. The object of the new suburb, according to the Liberal Member of parliament John Burns, who was then the president of the Local Government Board, was "to provide families with a well-built, modern home, regardless of class or status", and "to bring the towns into the country, and the country into the towns". Raphael's plan was to give the working classes a chance to enjoy a new home on land that had previously been occupied and enjoyed only by the "few in splendid isolation".

President

- Sir John Burns

Honorary secretary

- Michael Bunney

Vice-presidents

- Archbishop of Canterbury
- Archbishop of Westminster
- Robert Crewe-Milnes, 1st Marquess of Crewe
- Francis Greville, 5th Earl of Warwick (Lord Lieutenant of Essex)
- Daisy Greville, Countess of Warwick
- The Bishop of London
- The Bishop of St Albans
- John Lubbock, 1st Baron Avebury
- George Curzon, 1st Marquess Curzon of Kedleston
- John William Strutt, 3rd Baron Rayleigh
- Maurice Towneley-O'Hagan, 3rd Baron O'Hagan
- Lord Claude Hamilton
- Sir Edward Clarke
- Sir Alganon West
- Walter Long, 1st Viscount Long
- Amelius Lockwood, 1st Baron Lambourne
- Sir William Chance
- Sir James Fortescue Flannery
- Sir Hiram Maxim
- Sir Edward Poynter
- Sir Herbert H. Raphael
- Sir Frederick Treves, 1st Baronet
- Sir Lawrence Alma-Tadema
- Robert Baden-Powell, 1st Baron Baden-Powell
- John Bethell, 1st Baron Bethell
- Sir David Bruce
- Sir George Gibb
- Sir Oliver Lodge
- John Simon, 1st Viscount Simon
- Sir Aston Webb
- Charles Wyndham, 3rd Baron Leconfield
- Henry Scott Holland
- Edward Lyttelton
- Alfred Austin
- Arnold Bennett
- A. C. Benson
- George Cadbury
- Hall Caine
- Walter Crane
- Theodore Andrea Cook
- Alfred Hoare Powell
- Henry Arthur Jones
- Arthur Keen
- Benjamin Kidd
- Alfred Marshall

Note: For a complete list, see the source for the House and Cottage Exhibition Committee The Book of the Exhibition of Houses and Cottages, Romford Garden Suburb, Gidea Park, pp. 8–9.

=== Design and construction ===
The finishing touches being made to 36 and 38, Reed Pond Walk. The houses were designed by the Arts and Crafts architect, Baillie Scott.

43 Heath Drive, designed by William Curtis Green (to the right of the picture), nearing completion

Building for the new suburb started in 1909 when Raphael commissioned the construction of a new railway station which he intended to assist with accessibility for prospective buyers at the Exhibition. The station was to be served by the Great Eastern Main Line. The foundation stone was laid on the first dwelling on 28 July 1910. by Burns, The stone, part of the front elevation of 16 Heath Drive, is now only visible from inside the garage at the address.

By the late spring of 1911 the project was complete, and featured 140, fully furnished houses and small cottages, in the Arts and Crafts style. The entire development cost £60,000 (Note: £60,000 in 1910 equals (£6,110,520 in 2025 adjusted for inflation)) with a further £20,000 (Note: £20,000 in 1910 equals (£2,036,840 in 2025 adjusted for inflation)) being put aside for the building of roads, pavements and street furniture. The landscaping was carried out by William Barron & Son, Ltd.

To visualise what each house would look like, Raphael took inspiration from Henrik Ibsen's The Master Builder, which used the motto "Houses for people to live in" and from Francis Bacon's The Essayes Or Covnsels, Civill and Morall, of Francis Lo. Vervlam, Viscovnt St. Alban, which carried the phrase "A house is to live in, not to look at". Bacon's link to Gidea Park – his grandfather, Sir Anthony Cooke, occupied Gidea Hall in the 16th century – was used to advertise the new suburb. The Book of the Exhibition of Houses and Cottages: Romford Garden Suburb, Gidea Park was written to accompany the Exhibition and to detail each building for the benefit of prospective buyers. A number of important people were asked for their opinion on what made the perfect house and how modern day living could be improved, including Thomas Hardy, Sir Edward Poynter, Millicent Fawcett and Arnold Bennett.

The interiors were designed to make domestic living as economic as possible. There was much tiling throughout, especially in the kitchen and scullery, where surfaces could be cleaned easily. Some of the dwellings were furnished by the architect, and others by leading companies of the day, including Heal & Son who were based in Tottenham Court Road. The construction of each house was either funded solely by the architect or in partnership with the builder.

== Competition ==
Upon completion, a competition was held in the summer of 1911 to find the best building, an event that was witnessed by Raphael, Walters, McCurdy, and Sir Frederick Treves, among others. A first prize of £250 and a gold medal was awarded to the winning architect and builder. The judges, Guy Dawber, Henry Vaughan Lanchester and Mervyn Macartney, gave the best detached houses a Class I status, which would allow the property to be sold for £500. The best detached cottages were given a Class II status which allowed them to be marketed for £375. Smaller prizes were given for best internal decoration, best town plan, best garden design, drawings, and excellence in craftsmanship and construction. Admission to the public, and prospective buyers, was free. A sales office was opened at 75 Main Road, opposite Balgores Lane, in 1913 to cope with purchase enquiries and viewings. The building was thought by Nikolaus Pevsner to have been originally built for the Japan–British Exhibition in White City, but was relocated to its current site. (Note: 75 Main Road survives and is now an accountancy office.) Balgores House, which was built in the 1850s, since renamed to Gidea Park College, served as the exhibitions refreshments room.

=== Categories, prizes and winners ===
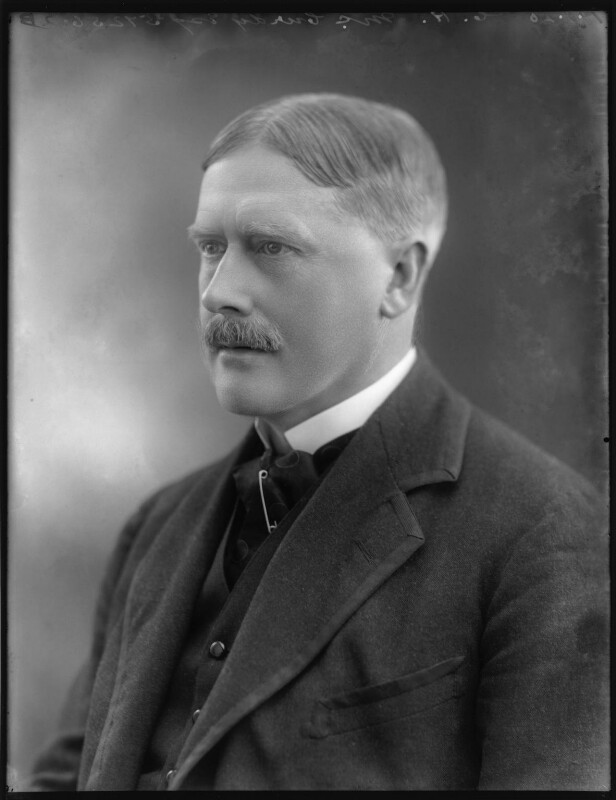
Charles McCurdy (top) and Tudor Walters, co-founders of the Gidea Hall Development Company, and judges in the exhibition

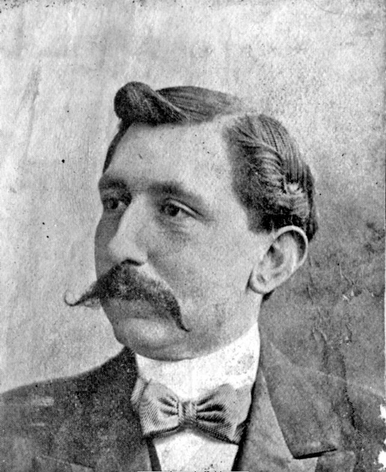

| Class | Open to architects | First prize | Second prize |
|---|---|---|---|
| I | A detached house to cost £500. First prize of £250 and a gold medal. Second prize of £100. | Plot 208, Parkway; by Geoffrey Lucas | Plot 240, Parkway; by Reginald T. Longden |
| II | A detached cottage to cost £375. First prize of £200 and a gold medal. Second prize of £100. | Plot 273, Meadway; by C. M. Crickmer | Plot 291, Meadway; by Herbert. A Welch |
| III | For the best internally fitted house in Classes I or II. First prize only, of £50. | Plot 348, Heaton Grange Road; by Stanley P. Schooling | Plot 282, Meadway; by Ernest Willmott |
| IV | For the best town plan of Gidea Park. First prize of £100. Second prize of £50. | W. Garnett Gibson and Reginald Dan | Geoffrey Lucas and T. A. Lodge |
| V | A garden design for either a House or Cottage, Class I or Class II. First prize of £25. Second prize of £10. | Plot 43, Heath Drive by William Curtis Green | Plot 208, Parkway by Geoffrey Lucas |
| VI | A prospective drawing, suitable for reproduction, of a House or Cottage entered for competition in Classes I or II. First prize of £10. Second prize of £5. | H. S. East | R. Mauchlen |
| Class | Open to builders | First prize | Second prize |
| VII | For excellence of workmanship and construction in the erection of a house or cottage in Classes I and II. First prize of £100 and a gold medal. Second prize £50. | Plot 43 Heath Drive; Faulkner & Sons | Plots 241 & 242, Reed Pond Walk; F. W. Jarvis |
| VIII | For wholly or partly furnished houses using furniture that is considered by the judges to be affordable and of suitable quality. A Gold and Silver medal will be awarded as a prize. | Heal & Son, Tottenham Court Road, London | Waring & Gillow, Oxford Street, London |
| IX | For improvements in materials used in house building, including tiles, bricks, partition walls, wall and ceiling coverings, etc. | Plot 244, Reed Pond Walk; for the use of silver grey bricks, supplied by S. & E. Collier of Reading, Berkshire | Plot 256, Meadway; for the use of wood burnt brown bricks, supplied by the Sussex Brick Company of Warnham |
| X | For improvements in fittings used in house building, including sanitary and domestic fittings, baths, stoves, cooking ranges. For improvements in lighting and heating, window and door dressings, etc. | The B. K range, exhibited by the Coalbrookdale Company Ltd. of Berners Street, West End of London | The Interoven Stove, exhibited by the Interoven Patent Stove Company of Kingsway, London |

=== Judges ===
Two interiors that featured in the furnished house VIII class. The bottom picture shows the living room interior, designed by Hindley & Wilkinson, of 201 Parkway, a house in the Class I category

- Charles Allom
- Walter Cave
- Guy Dawber
- Henry Vaughan Lanchester
- Halsey Ricardo
- Charles McCurdy
- Eden Phillpotts
- E. G. Pretyman
- J. W. Robertson Scott
- Leonard Stokes
- John Strachey
- Tudor Walters
- H. G. Wells
- Thomas McKinnon Wood
- Lawrence Weaver

Note: For a complete list, see the source for the House and Cottage Exhibition Committee The Book of the Exhibition of Houses and Cottages, Romford Garden Suburb, Gidea Park, pp. 8–9.

=== Architects and buildings ===
A request was made by the committee in the building press for architects to take part in the exhibition which would give them the chance to showcase their talents. The response was good with 100 architects signing up, with some completing several houses on the development. Of the notable architects, William Curtis Green, who had established his office just ten years previously, designed two properties, as did Baillie Scott, who was long established. Others included Robert van 't Hoff, Philip Tilden, Norman Jewson, and Raymond Unwin and Richard Barry Parker, who were both instrumental in the design of the garden suburb at Hampstead.

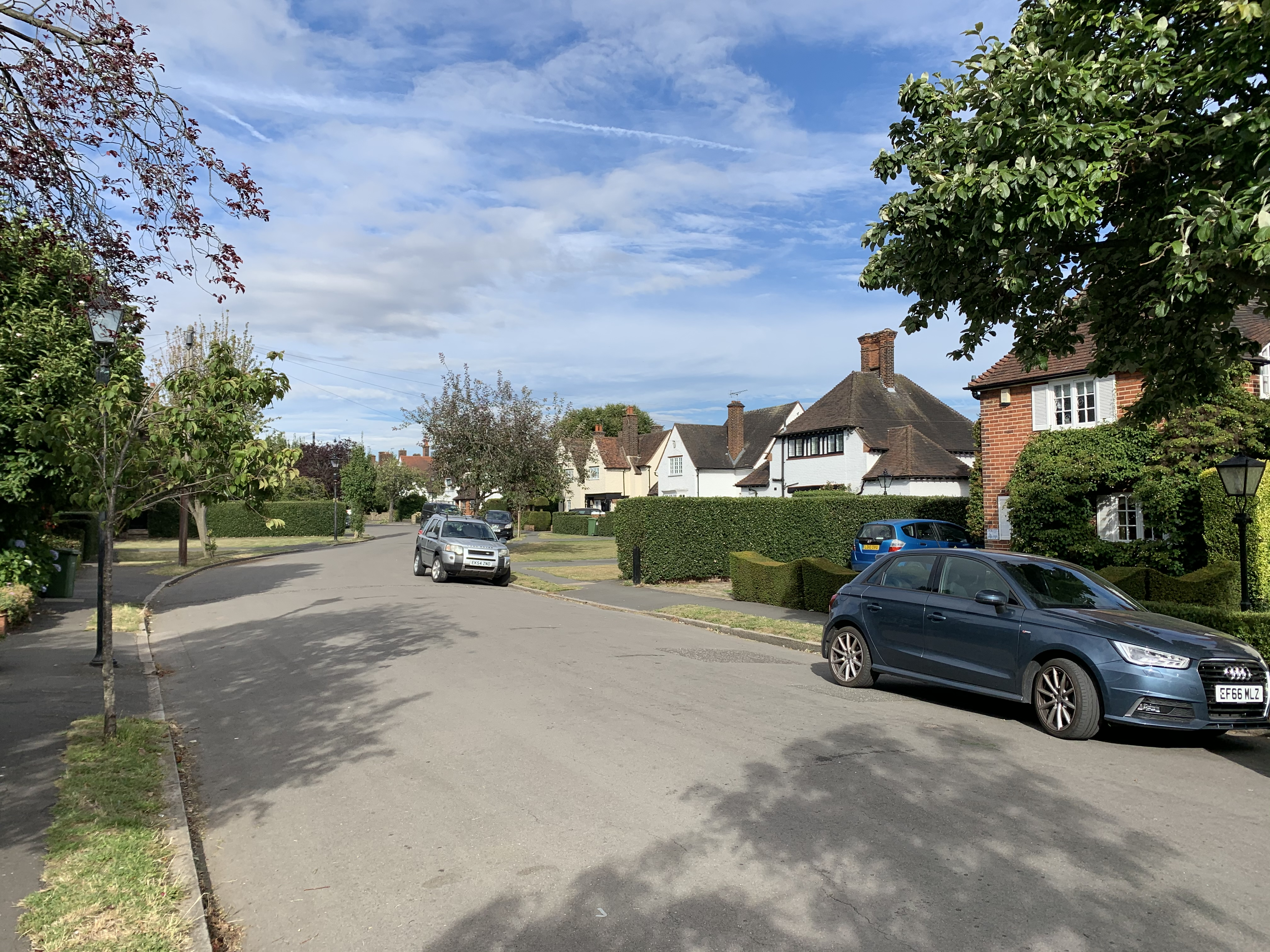
Meadway pictured in August 2020

Of the 159 dwellings that were built, six were designated as Grade II listed buildings by Historic England. On 14 September 1979, 16 and 27 Meadway; 36 and 38, Reed Pond Walk; and 43, Heath Drive, were added to the national register of protected buildings. 41 Heath Drive was added on 30 June 2000.

=== Purchasing ===
The first plot sold in July 1910, soon after the exhibition opened; on another plot, the first house was being built, at a cost of £850. (Note: £850 in 1910 equals (£86,566 in 2025 adjusted for inflation)) By the following year, 153 plots had been sold and £63,000 had already been invested in house building. Interested buyers were offered a special deal on the plots in the summer of 1911 by the Gidea Hall Development Company. The deal would include complete funding of the plot and dwelling in exchange for a £5 upfront payment followed by monthly or quarterly payments over a 7-year period. The purchaser could either choose the plot to invest in, or live in the house themselves. Each plot was sold for £100 (Note: £100 in 1911 equals (£10,184 in 2025 adjusted for inflation)) with the promise of the land being worth a lot more by the time the instalment term had expired.

The directors of the Gidea Hall Development Company agreed to pay the conveyancing costs, including the tax, and a Deed of Conveyance certificate was given to the purchaser on completion. Building on the plots was not a requirement; advice was given that the space could be used for plantation, until such a time when the purchaser wished to build a dwelling. Funding for a house was also offered by the company, in exchange for monthly payments over a 10, 15, or 20-year term. The offer included a 4% discount that would be applied to each purchase and should the purchaser die during the contract, all monies would be paid back to the deceased's estate.

== Gidea Park Modern Homes Exhibition ==
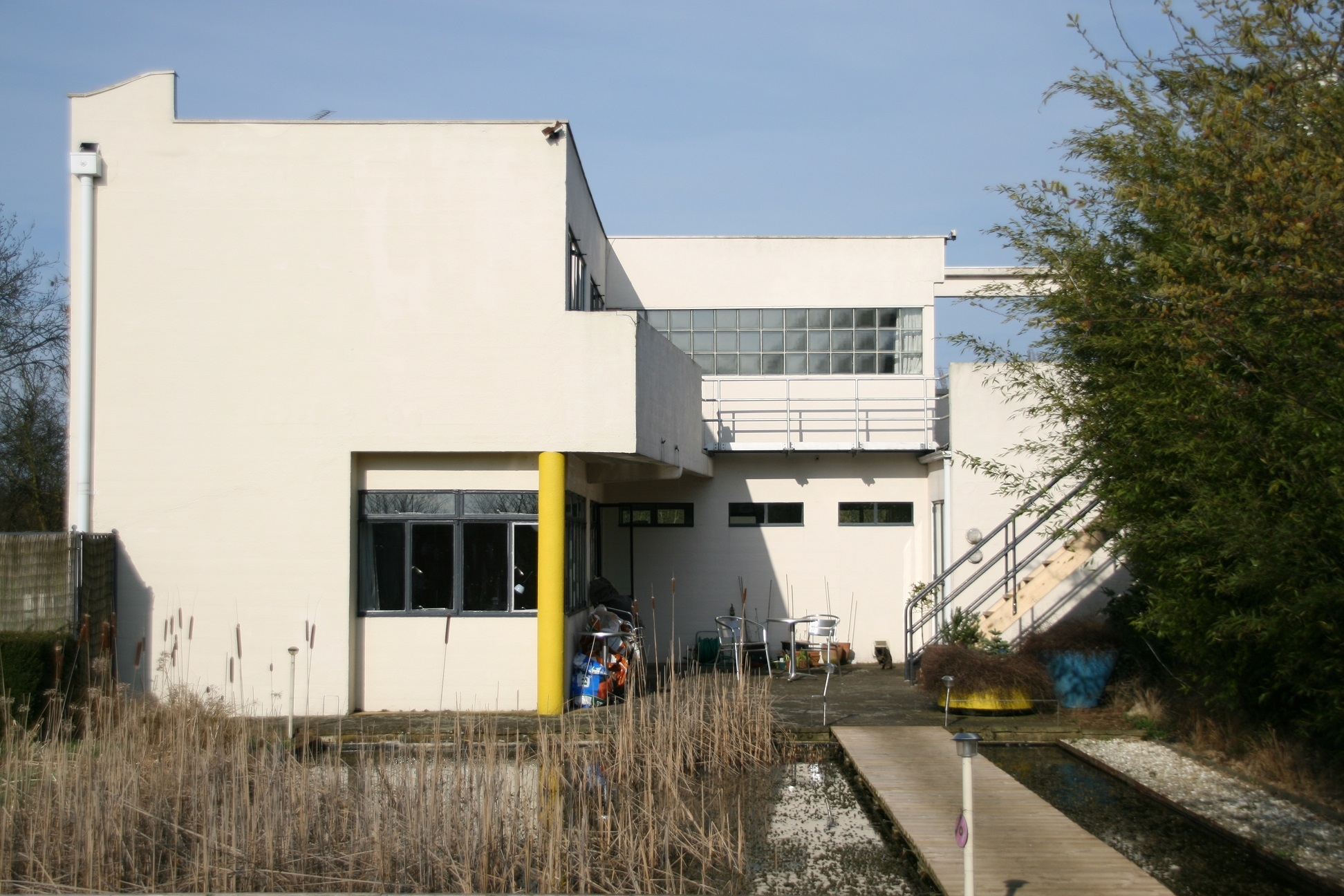
64 Heath Drive, the winning design from Francis Skinner for the Gidea Park Modern Homes Exhibition in 1934

A second competition, separate from the first, was held in Romford Garden Suburb between 31 July and 20 August 1934 and was called the Gidea Park Modern Homes Exhibition. It was the idea of Raphael's nephew, Major Ralph Raphael MC, who shared his uncle's 1911 vision; to build affordable, economical housing which benefited from the concept of rational design by competing architects. 35 houses were built and each were marketed from between £650 and £1,475.

The exhibition was opened by the Earl of Crawford and was visited by the Prince of Wales. It ran for 18 days but failed to achieve the kind of success that the 1911 exhibition did. The competition was won by Francis Skinner, then aged 26, who had been articled to Berthold Lubetkin two years previously and who was a founding member of Lubetkin's Tecton Group. The dwelling, 64 Heath Drive, was built at a cost of £900 (Note: £900 in 1934 equals (£55,691 in 2025 adjusted for inflation)) and was one of Tecton's first designs.

The suburb was made a conservation area by Havering Council in June 1970. On 24 March 1997, 64 Heath Drive was designated as a Grade II listed building by English Heritage.

== Notes and references ==
Notes

== Sources ==
- Cherry, Bridget; O'Brien, Charles; Pevsner, Nikolaus (2005). The Buildings of England: London 5: East. London: Penguin Books. ISBN 978-0-3001-0701-2.
