= Grace Bantebya Kyomuhendo =

Ugandan academic

- Born: October 2, 1963 (age 63); Hoima District
- Citizenship: Ugandan
- Education: Makerere University, Cambridge University, Hull University
- Employer: Makerere University
- Known for: Advocate for gender equality and Women Rights

Grace Bantebya Kyomuhendo (born October 2, 1963) is a Ugandan professor of Women and Gender Studies, advocate for gender equality, social transformation and respect for women's rights. She is also a social anthropologist, feminist and social norms researcher and a lecturer at Makerere University. She and Marjorie Keniston McIntosh co-authored a book called Women, Work and Domestic Virtue in Uganda 1900-2003 which won the Aidoo-Snyder Prize.

== Early life and education ==
Bantebya was born in Hoima District. She earned a Bachelor of Arts degree from Social Sciences Makerere University in Kampala in 1997, a Master of Philosophy in Social Anthropology from Cambridge University in 1990 and a PhD in Sociology and Social Anthropology from Hull University United Kingdom in 1997.

== Publications ==
Bantebya was the principal investigator on the “Whole University Approach: Kicking Sexual Harassment out of Higher Education Institutions in Uganda”. She was also a principal investigator of the International Development Research Centre Growth Opportunities for Women project. She was also a co-principal investigator of the Eastern African Social and Gender Norms Learning Collaborative Network hosted by Makerere University, School of Women and Gender Studies and Care International Uganda.

She published Transforming the Lives of Girls and Young women in Uganda, Viet Nam, Ethiopia and Nepal; Strengthening Linkages between Poverty Reduction Strategies and Child Protection Initiatives and both projects were commissioned by the Overseas Development Institute United Kingdom, Shame, Social Exclusion and the Effectiveness of Anti-poverty Programme supported by Economic and Social Research Council (ESRC). She also published Theory of change and impact policy evaluation in cross-national settings, and the recent one Prevention of Sexual Harassment in Higher Education Institutions in Uganda.

== Career ==
Bantebye is a member of the vice-chancellor’s one hundred eminent member Committee for investigating Sexual Harassment at Makerere University. She has chaired a number of Sexual Harassment allegations against staff to their conclusion. She is one of the International Sexual Exploitation and abuse investigator under Care International Uganda office. She also spearheaded the project called Strengthening the Resilience and Empowerment of Women Smallholder Farmers in Uganda. She was also the Chairperson Uganda Women’s Network and patron of Women agriculturalist and environmentalist association. She also served on the Uganda civil society capacity Building Committee funded by European Union and chairperson National Quality Assurance Certification Mechanism Council.

== Books and journal articles ==
- Grace Bantebya Kyomuhendo & Marjorie Keniston McIntosh (2006), Women, Work & Domestic Virtue in Uganda: 1900 – 2003. Jointly published by James Currey . ‐ Oxford Ohio University Press ‐ Athens and Fountain Publishers
- Grace Bantebya Kyomuhendo (2005) (Ed), Women’s Health, National and International Perspective. Published by Women and Gender Studies Makerere University, Makerere University Printery
- The shame of poverty.
- Low use of rural maternity services in Uganda: impact of women's status, traditional beliefs and limited resources
- Problem drinking and physical intimate partner violence against women: evidence from a national survey in Uganda
- Poverty in global perspective: is shame a common denominator?
- Social institutions as mediating sites for changing gender norms: Nurturing girl’s resilience to child marriage in Uganda.
- Eight: ‘Food that cannot be eaten’: the shame of Uganda's anti-poverty policies.
- Reflections on a collaborative experience: Using ICT in a trans-cultural women's health module.
- Culture, pregnancy and childbirth in Uganda: surviving the women's battle.
