= Patricia Phillippy =

American-born professor (born 1960)

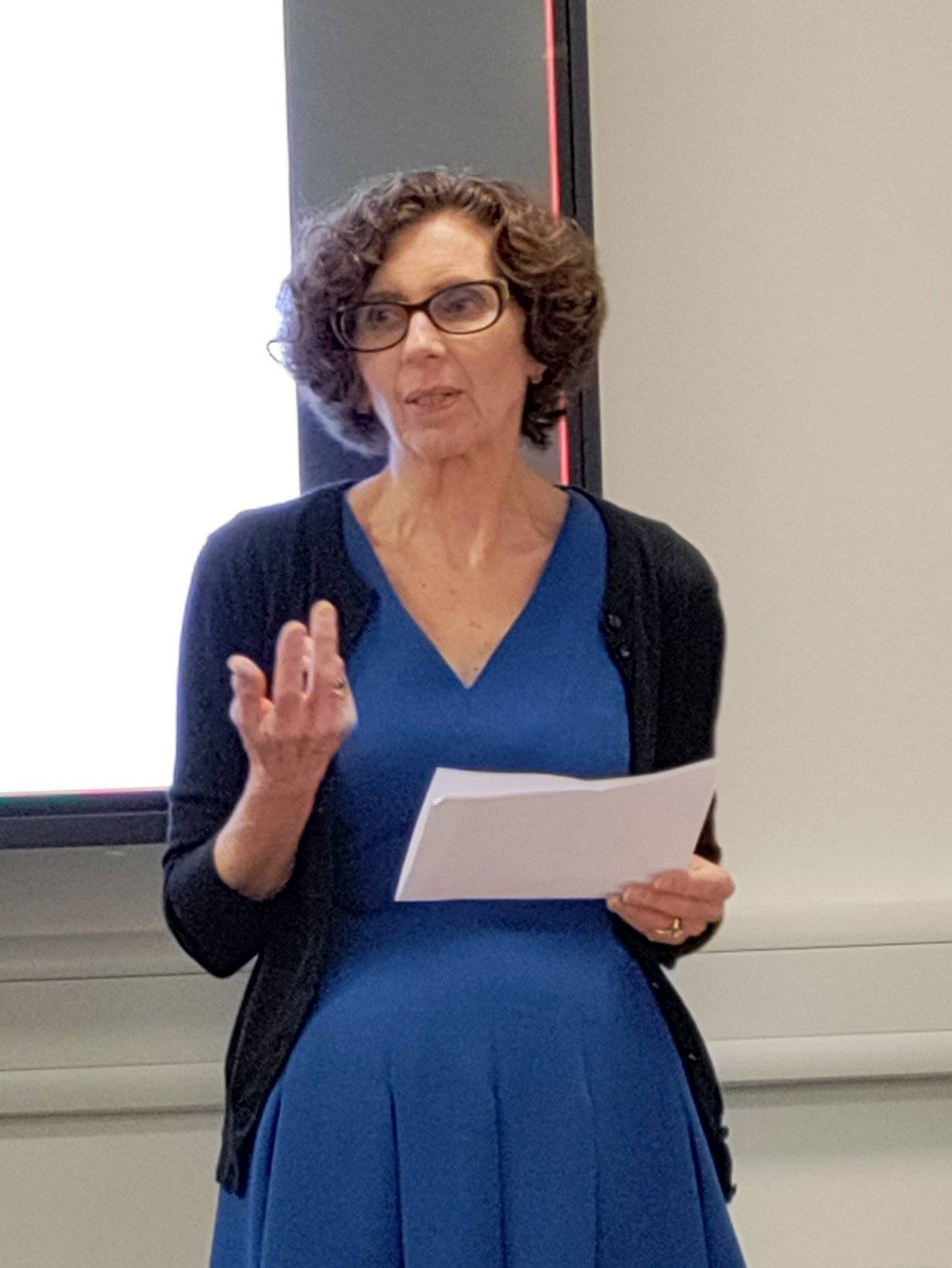
- Born: 1960
- Occupation: Academic staff
- Employer: Coventry University (2020–)
- Awards: Fellow of the Royal Historical Society
- Website: pureportal.coventry.ac.uk/en/persons/phillippy-phillippy

Patricia Berrahou Phillippy, FRHistS, (b. 1960) is Professor of Material and Cultural Memories and Executive Director of Centre for Arts, Memory, and Communities at Coventry University. She is an expert in early modern English literature and culture, particularly early modern formulations of gender and identity.

== Education ==
Phillippy was awarded a BA and an MA from The Johns Hopkins University. She received her PhD from Yale University in 1988. Her doctoral thesis was entitled Love's Remedies: Palinodic Discourse in Renaissance Literature.

== Career ==
From 1989 to 2010 Phillippy was a faculty member at Texas A&M University, as an Assistant, Associate, and full Professor. She joined Kingston University in 2010. She became Senior Editor of the Sixteenth Century Journal in 2012. She received a Leverhulme Trust Research Fellowship to complete her book Shaping Remembrance from Shakespeare to Milton, published by Cambridge University Press in 2018. She was appointed as Professor at Coventry University in 2020. She gave her inaugural lecture, 'Memory and Matter: Lady Anne Clifford’s “Life of Mee"', on 3 November 2020 on memory and materiality in the archive of Lady Anne Clifford (1590–1676).

She is a Fellow of the Royal Historical Society.

== Bibliography ==
- (ed.) A History of Early Modern Women's Writing (Cambridge: Cambridge University Press, 2018)
- Shaping Remembrance from Shakespeare to Milton (Cambridge: Cambridge University Press, 2018)
- (ed., trans. by J. Goodrich) Elizabeth Cooke Hoby Russell: The Writings of an English Sappho (Toronto: Centre for Reformation and Renaissance Studies, 2011)
- Painting Women: Cosmetics, Canvases, and Early Modern Culture (Baltimore: Johns Hopkins University Press, 2005)
- Women, Death and Literature in Post-Reformation England (Cambridge: Cambridge University Press, 2002)
- Love's Remedies: Recantation and Renaissance Lyric Poetry (Cranbury: Bucknell University Press, 1995)
