= Thomas Drant =

English clergyman & poet (c.1540–1578)

Thomas Drant (c.1540–1578) was an English clergyman and poet. Work of his on prosody was known to Sir Philip Sidney and Edmund Spenser. He was in the intellectual court circle known as the 'Areopagus', and including, as well as Sidney, Edward Dyer, Gabriel Harvey, and Daniel Rogers. He translated Horace into English, taking a free line in consideration of the Roman poet's secular status; but he mentioned he found Horace harder than Homer. Drant's translation was the first complete one of the Satires in English, in fourteeners, but makes some radical changes of content.

== Life ==
The son of Thomas Drant, he was born at Hagworthingham in Lincolnshire. He matriculated as pensioner of St John's College, Cambridge, 18 March 1558, proceeded B.A. 1561, was admitted fellow of his college 21 March 1561, and commenced M.A. 1564. On the occasion of Queen Elizabeth's visit to the university in August 1564 he composed copies of English, Latin, and Greek verses, which he presented to her majesty. At the commencement in 1565 he performed a public exercise (printed in his Medicinable Morall) on the theme 'Corpus Christi non est ubique.'

He was the domestic chaplain to Edmund Grindal, who procured for him the post of divinity reader at St. Paul's Cathedral. In 1569 he proceeded B.D., and on 28 July in that year he was admitted by Grindal's influence to the prebend of Chamberlainwood in the church of St. Paul's. On 8 January 1570 he preached before the court at Windsor, strongly rebuking vanity of attire; he also criticized the Queen for her leniency to the northern rebels and Catholics. He was admitted to the prebend of Firles in the church of Chichester 21 January 1570, to the rectory of Slinfold in Sussex 31 January and to the archdeaconry of Lewes 27 February.

On Easter Tuesday 1570 he preached a sermon at St. Mary Spital, London, denouncing the sensuality of the citizens; and he preached another sermon at the same place on Easter Tuesday 1572. He had some dispute with William Overton, treasurer of the church of Chichester, whom he accused in the pulpit of pride, hypocrisy, and ignorance. He is supposed to have died about 17 April 1578, since the archdeaconry of Lewes was vacant at that date.

== Works ==
Drant is the author of:

- Impii cuiusdem Epigrammatis qvod edidit Richardus Shacklockus . . . Apomaxis. Also certayne of the special articles of the Epigramme, refuted in Englyshe, 1565, Latin and English. Against Richard Shacklock.
- A Medicinable Morall, that is, the two Bookes of Horace his Satyres Englyshed. ... The wailyngs of the prophet Hieremiah, done into Englyshe verse. Also epigrammes, 1566. Some copies have at the back of the title a dedicatory inscription, 'To the Right Honorable my Lady Bacon, and my Lady Cicell, sisters, fauourers of learnyng and vertue.' Among the miscellaneous pieces that follow the translation of Jeremiah are the English and Latin verses that Drant presented to the queen on her visit to Cambridge in 1564, English verses to the Earl of Leicester, and Latin verses to Chancellor Cecil.
- Horace his arte of Poetrie, epistles, and Satyrs, Englished and to the Earle of Ormounte, by Tho. Drant, addressed, 1567.
- Greg. Nazianzen his Epigrams and Spiritual Sentences, 1568.
- Two Sermons preached, the one at S. Maries Spittle on Tuesday in Easter weeke 1570, and the other at the Court of Windsor . . . the viij of January . . . 1569. n. d. [1570?].
- A fruitful and necessary Sermon specially concernyng almes geving, n. d. [1572 ?], preached at St. Mary Spittle on Easter Tuesday 1572.
- In Solomonis regis Ecclesiastem . . . paraphrasis poetica, 1572, dedicated to Sir Thomas Heneage.
- Thomse Drantae Angli Advordingamii Praesul. Ejusdem Sylva, undated, but published not earlier than 1576, There are Latin verses to Queen Elizabeth, Grindal, Matthew Parker, Lord Buckhurst, and others, and on pp. 85–6 are verses in Drant's praise by James Sandford in Greek, Latin, Italian, and French.

Commendatory Latin verses by Drant are prefixed to John Foxe's Acts and Monuments, 1570; John Sadler's translation of Vegetius's Tactics, 1572; Peter Carter's annotations to John Seton's Dialectica, 1574; Alexander Neville's Kettus, 1575; Llodowick Lloyd's Pilgrimage of Princes, n. d. He has a copy of English verses before Robert Peterson's Galateo, 1576. Drant's unpublished works included a translation of the Iliad, as far as the fifth book, a translation of the Psalms, and the Book of Solomons Prouerbs, Epigrames, and Sentences spirituall, licensed for press in 1567.
