= Lady Catherine Killigrew =

English gentlewoman and scholar

Lady Catherine Killigrew (c. 1530 – 27 December 1583) was an English gentlewoman and scholar, the wife of Sir Henry Killigrew.

== Biography ==
Catherine was the fourth daughter of Sir Anthony Cooke and Alice, daughter of Sir William Waldegrave. Her older sister Anne was the wife of Sir Nicholas Bacon, and another sister Mildred was the wife of Lord Burghley. Catherine was said to have been proficient in Hebrew, Greek, and Latin.

Lady Catherine married Sir Henry on 4 November 1565, and had four surviving daughters. Sir John Harington, in the notes to his translation of Orlando Furioso, has preserved some Latin lines in which she asked her sister Mildred, wife of Cecil, Lord Burghley, to use her influence to get her husband excused from going on an embassy to France. The verses were reprinted in Fuller's Worthies.

On 21 December 1583, she gave birth to a stillborn child, and on 27 December she died. She was buried in the church of St. Thomas the Apostle, London. It was burnt down during the Great Fire of London, but Stow, in his Survey, preserved the four Latin inscriptions on her monument, including one by herself and one by Andrew Melville.
