= William Cooke (died 1589) =

English politician (died 1589)

William Cooke (died 14 May 1589), was an English politician.

William Cooke was the son of Sir Anthony Cooke of Gidea Hall, Essex, and Anne Fitzwilliam, the daughter of Sir William Fitzwilliam, Master of the Worshipful Company of Merchant Taylors and Sheriff of London, by his first wife, Anne Hawes, daughter of Sir John Hawes, by whom he had four sons and five daughters:

His paternal grandparents were John Cooke (d. 10 October 1515), esquire, of Gidea Hall, Essex, and Alice Saunders (d. 1510), daughter and coheiress of William Saunders of Banbury, Oxfordshire by Jane Spencer, daughter of John Spencer, esquire, of Hodnell, Warwickshire.

He was a Member (MP) of the Parliament of England for Stamford in 1559 and Grantham in 1563.

He married Frances Grey, daughter of Lord John Grey of Pirgo and Mary Browne, by whom he had four sons and three daughters, including:

- Sir Richard Cooke MP (1561–1616), Secretary of State for Ireland
- William Cooke (1572–1619) of Highnam, Gloucestershire, who married Joyce Lucy, granddaughter of Sir Thomas Lucy of Charlecote,
- Edward Cooke (born 1576)
