= Marjorie McIntosh =

Marjorie McIntosh may refer to:

- Marjorie McIntosh (historian)
- Marjorie McIntosh (politician)
