= Anthony Cooke =

English humanist scholar (1501–1576)

Sir Anthony Cooke
- Born: June 1501
- Died: 11 June 1576 (aged 71)
- Resting place: Church of St Edward the Confessor, Romford
- Known for: Promoting education for girls
- Office: High Sheriff of Essex
- Spouse: Anne Fitzwilliam
- Children: Anthony Cooke (c. 1535–1604); Richard Cooke; William Cooke (?–1589); Mildred Cooke (1526–1589); Elizabeth Cooke (1527–1609); Anne Cooke (c. 1528–1610); Catherine Cooke (c. 1530–1583); Margaret Cooke (?–1558); Edward Cooke (1557–1584)
- Awards: Knight of the Bath

Sir Anthony Cooke, KB (June 1501 – 11 June 1576) was an English humanist scholar. He was a companion and tutor to King Edward VI.

== Family ==
Anthony Cooke was the only son of John Cooke (died 10 October 1516), esquire, of Gidea Hall, Essex, and Alice Saunders (died 1510), daughter and coheiress of William Saunders of Banbury, Oxfordshire by Jane Spencer, daughter of John Spencer, esquire, of Hodnell, Warwickshire. His paternal grandparents were Sir Philip Cooke (died 7 December 1503) and Elizabeth Belknap (died c. 6 March 1504). His paternal great-grandparents were Sir Thomas Cooke, a wealthy member of the Worshipful Company of Drapers and Lord Mayor of London in 1462–3, and Elizabeth Malpas, daughter of Philip Malpas, Master of the Worshipful Company of Drapers and Sheriff of London. Lord Chancellor Francis Bacon was one of Anthony Cooke's grandsons.

== Career ==
Cooke served as High Sheriff of Essex in 1545.

He was never officially described as tutor to Edward VI. It is now firmly believed he may have been more a companion and guide than a formal teacher. However, in 1555 Caelius Secundus Curio, in his dedication letter to Cooke of Sir John Cheke's De Pronuntiatione Graecae, wrote that "the boyhood of King Edward was handed over and entrusted to the two of you for instruction in letters, behaviour and religion... from you that divine boy drank in that learning, than which not Cyrus, nor Achilles, nor Alexander, nor any king ever received more wholesome and sacred."

Peter Martyr, in dedicating to Cooke his Commentaries on St Paul's Epistle to the Romans (published 1558), wrote: "I for my part doubtles have, ever since that the time that I dwelt in England, borne a singular love and no smal or vulgar affection towards you, both for your singular piety and learning, and also for the worthy office which you faythfully and with great renoune executed in the Christian publike wealth, in instructing Edward, that most holy King..."

Of his preceptors, Edward is reputed to have said,

"Randolph the German spoke honestly, Sir John Cheke talked merrily, Dr. Coxe solidly, and Sir Anthony Cooke weighingly."

At Edward's coronation, Cooke was created a Knight of the Bath. On 8 November 1547 he was returned to Parliament for Lewes, and in the same year was one of the visitors commissioned by the crown to inspect the dioceses of London, Westminster, Norwich, and Ely; the injunctions drawn up by him and his companions are printed in John Foxe's Acts and Monuments. Two years later he served on two ecclesiastical commissions, of Protestant tendencies. In November and December 1551 he attended the discussion held between Roman Catholics and Protestants at the houses of Sir William Cecil and Sir Richard Moryson, and his public services were rewarded (27 October 1552) with a grant of land. On 27 July 1553 he was committed to the Tower of London on suspicion of complicity in Lady Jane Grey's movement.

In 1550, he purchased Hartshill Castle in Nuneaton.

After his release, he went into self-imposed exile to avoid Mary I's attempt to reintroduce Catholicism. He travelled widely, spending the most time in Strasbourg where he was in contact with leaders of the Reformed faith, and returned following the death of Mary and the accession of Elizabeth I in 1558.

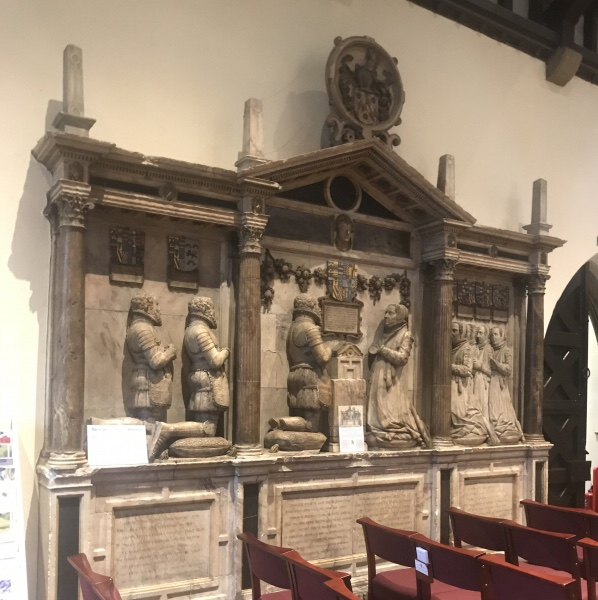
Memorial to Cooke at the Church of St Edward the Confessor, in Romford

Cooke then served on several religious commissions, and sat as a knight of the shire for Essex in parliament in 1559 and again in 1563; but he took little or no further part in national affairs. He was appointed Custos Rotulorum for Essex in 1572, but the work resulting from this post was performed by his steward, Francis Ram. He died on 11 June 1576, aged seventy-two, and was buried in St Andrew's, Romford. There is an elaborate memorial to him in St Edward the Confessor Church, Romford. This notes his "exceptional learning, prudence and piety". However, Marjorie McIntosh describes him as "a strong protestant of a dark and unforgiving colour".

He was one of the co-owners of Burton Dassett in Warwickshire and conducted a lengthy, but ultimately unsuccessful legal campaign to block the sale of part of the estate to Peter Temple.

Cooke is particularly remembered because he educated his daughters, who were taught both Latin and Greek. Anne published translations from Italian and Latin and Elizabeth a translation of a Latin treatise on the sacrament. While he left plate to all of his children, the five girls were also allowed to select three books (two Latin and one Greek) from his library.

== Marriage and issue ==
Cooke married Anne Fitzwilliam, the daughter of Sir William Fitzwilliam, Master of the Worshipful Company of Merchant Taylors and Sheriff of London, by his first wife, Anne Hawes, daughter of Sir John Hawes, by whom he had four sons and five daughters:

- Anthony Cooke (c. 1535 – 1604).
- Sir Richard Cooke, who married Anne Caunton.
- Edward Cooke (1557–1566)
- William Cooke (died 14 May 1589), who married Frances Grey, daughter of Lord John Grey of Pirgo, by whom he had four sons, including Sir Richard Cooke, Secretary of State for Ireland, and William Cooke of Highnam, Gloucestershire, who married Joyce Lucy, granddaughter of Sir Thomas Lucy of Charlecote, and three daughters.
- Mildred Cooke (1526–89), who in December 1545 married, as his second wife, William Cecil, 1st Baron Burghley, by whom she was the mother of Robert Cecil, 1st Earl of Salisbury.
- Anne Cooke (c. 1528 – 1610), who married, as his second wife, Sir Nicholas Bacon, by whom she was the mother of Sir Francis Bacon and Anthony Bacon.
- Catherine Cooke (c. 1530 – 1583), who married Sir Henry Killigrew.
- Elizabeth Cooke (1527–1609), who married firstly Sir Thomas Hoby and secondly John, Lord Russell (c. 1553 – 1584), second son of Francis Russell, 2nd Earl of Bedford.
- Margaret Cooke (died 3 August 1558), who was a lady in waiting to Mary I, and in 1558 married, as his second wife, Sir Ralph Rowlett.

== Sources ==
- Calkins, Donn L. (September 2004). "Cooke, Sir Anthony (1505/6–1576)". Oxford Dictionary of National Biography (online ed.). Oxford University Press. doi:10.1093/ref:odnb/6155. (Subscription, Wikipedia Library access or UK public library membership required.)
- Hartley, Cathy, ed. (2003). A Historical Dictionary of British Women (Rev. ed.). London: Europa Publications Limited. ISBN 9781135355340.

Political offices
Preceded by Sir William Petre	Custos Rotulorum of Essex c. 1573–1576	Succeeded by Sir Thomas Mildmay
