= Anthony Bacon (1558–1601) =

English politician (1558–1601)

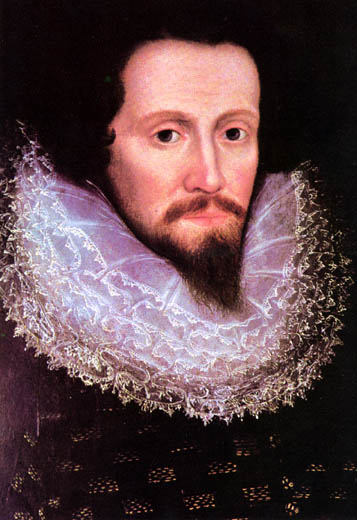
- Anthony Bacon in 1594
- Born: 1558; London, Kingdom of England
- Died: 1601 (aged 42–43)
- Resting place: St Olave Hart Street
- Education: Trinity College, Cambridge
- Parent(s): Sir Nicholas Bacon; Anne Cooke

Anthony Bacon (1558–1601) was a member of the powerful English Bacon family and was a spy during the Elizabethan era. He was Francis Bacon's elder brother.

== Early years, 1558–1580 ==
Anthony Bacon was born in 1558, the same year that his father, Sir Nicholas Bacon, was appointed Lord Keeper of the Great Seal by Queen Elizabeth I. His mother, Anne, was the daughter of noted humanist Anthony Cooke. His mother's sister was married to William Cecil, 1st Baron Burghley, making Burghley Anthony Bacon's uncle. Anthony Bacon's more famous younger brother, Francis Bacon, was born three years after him, in 1561.

Anthony and his brother spent their early years at York House in the Strand, London. Their mother (who was one of the most educated women of her day, speaking French, Latin, Greek, Spanish, Hebrew and Italian) oversaw their early education. In April 1573, the Bacon brothers enrolled in Trinity College, Cambridge, where they lived in the household of the Master of Trinity College, John Whitgift. The boys' father died in February 1579 after having been one of the most powerful men in England for the past twenty years.

== Years in France, 1580–1592 ==
Bacon travelled to France in 1580. While there, he served as an intelligencer reporting to English spymaster Sir Francis Walsingham. He initially settled in Montauban. In 1586, he was charged with sodomy for having sex with his page Isaac Burgades, who had sodomised other pages in the household, and they in turn having let the practice become known in the town. Although the theoretical punishment was still burning at the stake, as the result of intervention in 1587 of King Henry III of Navarre, Bacon never suffered any consequence, but left Montauban because of the scandal.

He was friends with Montaigne and spent two years at Bordeaux at the time Montaigne was preparing the fourth edition of his Essays. In 1590, Bacon helped Anthony Standen, another spy, who was in prison in Bordeaux and paid his debts and made his return to England possible.

Anthony lived in France until 1592, and was a friend of Henry of Navarre after his coronation as Henry IV.

== Living with his brother, 1592–1594 ==
Bacon returned to England in February 1592. He initially stayed with his brother Francis in Francis' chambers at Gray's Inn. Together, they established a scrivenery employing scriveners who acted as secretaries, writers, translators, copyists and cryptographers, dealing with correspondence, translations, copying, ciphers, essays, books, plays, entertainments and masques.

In 1593, Bacon paid for his friend Antonio Pérez to come to England. Pérez may have been the model for the character of Don Adriano de Armado in William Shakespeare's Love's Labour's Lost. In 1593 Bacon was also elected member of Parliament for Wallingford, Berkshire.

== In the household of the 2nd Earl of Essex, 1595–1601 ==
In April 1594, Bacon established his own residence in Bishopsgate near the Black Bull Inn and theatre. Bacon cultivated the friendship of a Scottish diplomat David Foulis to gain the favour of James VI of Scotland. He joked with another Scottish envoy James Colville, laird of Wemyss about the height of Sir Robert Cecil, a political opponent of the Earl of Essex.

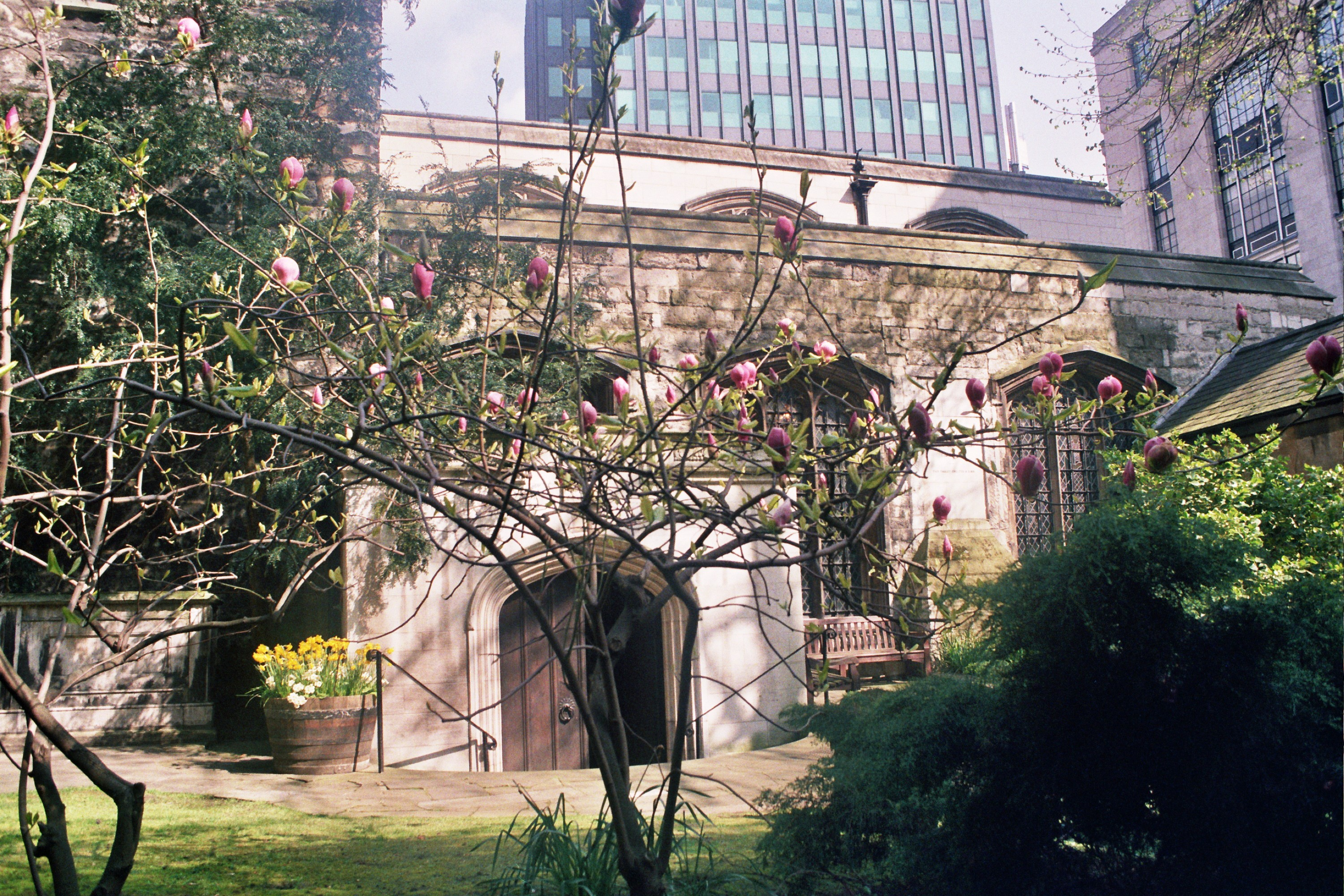
St. Olave's Church, London

The next year, he became Secretary of State for Robert Devereux, 2nd Earl of Essex and moved into Essex House. During this time, Essex House was the centre of the so-called "Shakespeare circle", a literary circle that involved the Earl of Essex, Sir Thomas Walsingham, and Henry Herbert, 2nd Earl of Pembroke. Sir Henry Cuffe and Sir Henry Wotton were also among the Earl of Essex's supporters at this time.

In 1595 the Chancellor of Scotland, John Maitland of Thirlestane, wrote to the Earl of Essex, trying to establish a correspondence, a future "diligent intercourse of intelligence" involving Bacon and the Scottish diplomat Richard Cockburn of Clerkington. Essex replied that he wrote only with the queen's knowledge, and they would be happy to receive letters from Maitland or Cockburn. Bacon met another Scottish envoy, William Keith of Delny, who wrote to him in November 1595 offering his services to Elizabeth against Spain. Bacon wrote to John Bothwell, stressing secrecy.

Anne of Denmark asked for the portraits of the Earl of Essex and Lady Rich, and James Hudson passed this request to Bacon on 5 December 1595. In 1596 Queen Elizabeth, via Bacon, sent her miniature portrait by Nicholas Hilliard to Prince Henry, and this was received by the Earl of Mar at Stirling Castle.

According to the Scottish diplomat and intriguer Archibald Douglas, James VI gave Bacon a valuable ring. The ring was selected from a goldsmith in London by the financier Thomas Foulis who gave it to Douglas to present to Bacon. Foulis accounted for the ring from the subsidy money the king received. Bacon later tried to pawn the ring with the same London goldsmith, who said it was worth only half the amount that Foulis had claimed.

In 1597 Bacon was MP for Oxford.

In 1601, Essex was accused, and then convicted, of high treason, with Bacon's brother Francis playing a role in Essex's prosecution. Anthony Bacon died shortly thereafter, at the home of Essex's widow Frances Walsingham. He is buried at St Olave Hart Street.

== Legacy ==
After Anthony's death, Francis Bacon collected his correspondence, bequeathing it to his literary executor William Rawley, who in turn bequeathed it to Thomas Tenison, who in turn bequeathed it to the Lambeth Palace library, where it remains.

The 1975 biography by Daphne du Maurier, Golden Lads, located the archival records in Montauban; no English records had existed.
