= Lord John Grey (Tudor nobleman) =

- Born: 1523 or 1524
- Died: 19 November 1564 (aged 39-41)
- Spouse: Mary Browne
- Children: 7, including Henry
- Parents: Thomas Grey (father); Margaret Wotton (mother)
- Relatives: Henry Grey (brother); Thomas Grey (grandfather); Cecily Bonville (grandmother)

Lord John Grey (1523/24 – 19 November 1564) was an English nobleman and courtier of the Tudor period, who after 1559 was seated at Pirgo Place in Essex.

Lord John was at one stage sentenced to death for his involvement in Wyatt's Rebellion against Queen Mary I, but was later released from attainder. Grey was restored to his original position by Queen Mary's successor Queen Elizabeth I, who also granted him Pirgo Place in Essex as well as making him Guardian of Lady Katherine Grey, his niece, and sister of the late Lady Jane Grey, in 1563. However, Lord John was again imprisoned shortly before his death, after publishing a book asserting Katherine Grey to be the legitimate heir to the English throne.

== Origins ==
He was the youngest surviving son of Thomas Grey, 2nd Marquess of Dorset by his second wife Margaret Wotton, widow of William Medley, and daughter of Sir Robert Wotton, of Boughton Malherbe, Kent. He thus bore the courtesy title of "Lord", appropriate for a younger son of a marquess. His elder brothers, Henry Grey, 1st Duke of Suffolk, 3rd Marquess of Dorset and Lord Thomas Grey, were executed for treason on Tower Hill in 1554.

== Marriage and children ==
He married Mary Browne, a daughter of Sir Anthony Browne, KG, by his first wife Alice Gage. By his wife he had three sons and four daughters including:

- Henry Grey, 1st Baron Grey of Groby, eldest son and heir, seated at Pirgo Place, who re-established the Grey family presence both at court and at their ancestral domains including Bradgate and Groby in Leicestershire. His grandson was Henry Grey, 1st Earl of Stamford.
- Margaret Grey, wife of Sir Arthur Capell of Hadham, Sheriff of Hertfordshire in 1592, reputed to have had eleven sons and nine daughters. She was the ancestor of the Barons Capell of Hadham later Earls of Essex.
- Frances Grey, wife of Sir William Cooke (died 1589), of Highnam, Gloucestershire, son of Sir Anthony Cooke of Gidea Hall, Essex (near Pirgo Place).
- Elizabeth Grey, wife of Sir Henry Denny, of Cheshunt, Hertfordshire; ancestor of the Denny baronets.
- Jane Grey, wife of Sir Edward Greville, of Harold Court, Essex; younger brother of Fulke Greville, 4th Baron Willoughby de Broke.

== Royal service ==
Grey was appointed Lord Deputy of Newhaven (now Le Havre) in France in charge of the English fortress then being strengthened and given extra storage facilities. Lord John then received grants from Edward VI of the rectory of Kirby Bellars and other estates such as Bardon Park in Leicestershire, and in his ancestral home county of Derbyshire as well as in Nottinghamshire, affirmed by Queen Mary.

== Wyatt's Rebellion ==
Lord John Grey and his brothers became involved in Wyatt's Rebellion which proposed to replace Catholic Queen Mary with her Protestant half-sister Elizabeth for which he was condemned to death. His brothers, Henry Grey, 3rd Marquess of Dorset (later Duke of Suffolk) and Lord Thomas Grey, were both executed but with the backing of his Catholic brother-in-law, the Viscount Montagu, Lord John Grey was released though still under attainder, and lived in obscurity until the death of Queen Mary.

Grey became his father the 2nd Marquess's sole surviving son and heir but was deprived of the family marquessate, forfeited in 1554, thus being unable to sit in Parliament.

Lady Jane Grey, his niece, had already been sentenced to death for treason before Wyatt's Rebellion and was executed the month after the rebellion.

== Queen Elizabeth's accession ==
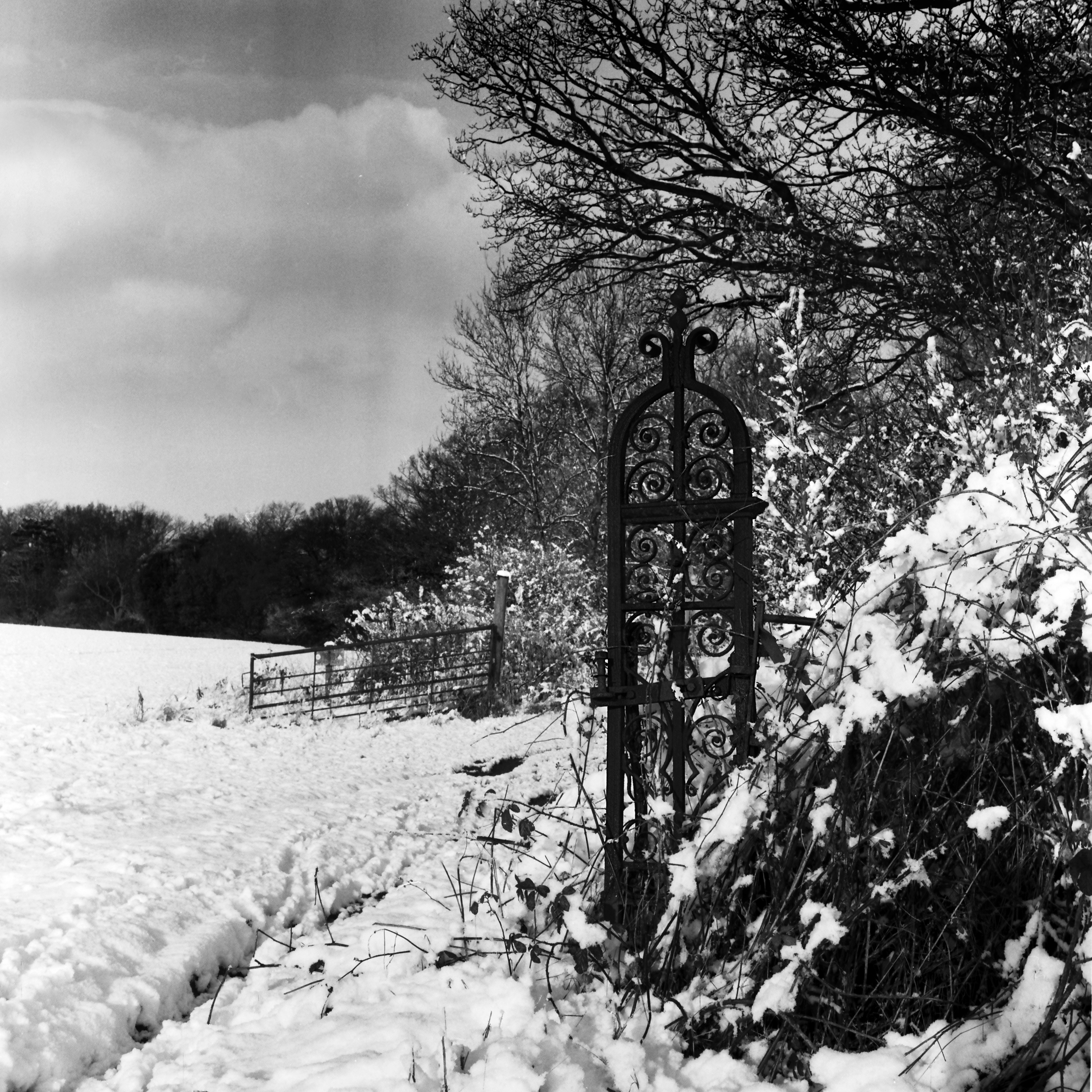
Pirgo Place, Essex An iron gatepost surviving from the former Tudor royal palace

Lord John was summoned to court as head of the Grey family, attended Queen Elizabeth's first progress into London and gave her a costly gift on the first New Year's Day of her reign. A few months later he complained of poverty to Lord Burghley, her prime minister, and the Queen granted him the royal manor of Pirgo, Essex and its mansion, as well as lands in Somerset. He was "restored in blood", released from the Act of Attainder and appointed one of the four Protestant noblemen to supervise alterations to the Book of Common Prayer.

== Lady Katherine Grey ==
Lord John's niece, Katherine, Lady Jane Grey's younger sister and heiress presumptive under the Will of Henry VIII, had married secretly Edward Seymour, 1st Earl of Hertford in 1560 without royal assent. The marriage was quickly discovered and Lady Katherine Grey was confined to The Tower.

Released under house arrest in 1563 for the safety of her health during an outbreak of plague she was moved to Pirgo Place under the care of Lord John Grey. However, after a book circulated claiming Lady Katherine to be the rightful heir to the English throne and not Mary, Queen of Scots, Queen Elizabeth removed Katherine from Lord John's charge and took him briefly into custody.

== Death and burial ==
Lord John Grey died a short time later at Pirgo on 19 November 1564 and was buried in the estate's domestic chapel, which was demolished between about 1771 and 1778. His now lost monument there was described in Collins' Peerage of England, published 1812, as follows:

... a tomb in the chapel of the mansion house at Pirgo in Essex; on which was a knight kneeling with four sons, his lady kneeling with four daughters, and many coats and quarterings; and bearing on the verge this inscription: "Here under lyeth buried the lorde John . . . Grey, Knyght (fourth son of) the lorde Thomas Grey mar . . . . . ques Dorcet, who dyed the xix daye of November 1564; and dame Mary his wyfe, daughter of Sir Anthony Browne, Knyght of the Garter, m(aster)r of the horse, and con'seler to Kynge Henry ye VIII. Dame Mary dyed . . . .".

== Arms ==
Arms of Grey

The arms of the head of the Grey family are blazoned Barry of six argent and azure in chief three torteaux gules.

== See also ==
- Marquess of Dorset
- Earl of Stamford
- House of Grey
