= Elizabeth Cooke, Lady Russell =

English poet and noblewoman (1540–1609)

Elizabeth Russell, Lady Russell
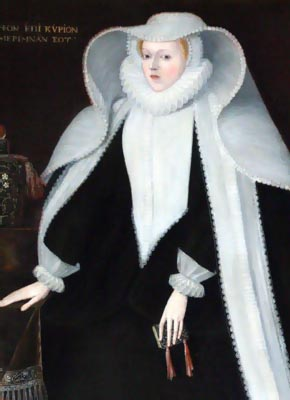
- Born: Cooke c.1540 Gidea Hall, Essex
- Died: 1609
- Resting place: Church of All Saints, Bisham, Berkshire
- Other name: formerly Hoby
- Known for: First known female keeper of a castle, linguist
- Spouse(s): Sir Thomas Hoby John, Lord Russell
- Children: Sir Edward Hoby; Thomas Posthumus Hoby (1566–1640); Anne Russell; Elizabeth Russell

Elizabeth Russell, Lady Russell (née Cooke; formerly Hoby; 1540–1609) was an English poet and noblewoman. She was an influential member of Queen Elizabeth I's court and was known in her time for her refined poetry as well as her musical talent. In 1596, she was a vocal opponent of the reconstruction of Blackfriars Theatre in that London district.

== Life ==
She was born at Gidea Hall, Essex, the third daughter of Anthony Cooke, who was tutor to Edward VI. Cooke educated his four daughters to a high level for his day. Her sister, Anne Bacon, became a notable scholar. Elizabeth was proficient in Latin and French. Elizabeth's first marriage was on 27 June 1558, to Thomas Hoby, of Bisham Abbey, Berkshire, noted as the translator of Baldassare Castiglione's The Book of the Courtier into English. In March 1566, he was knighted and became the English ambassador to France. The couple moved to Paris. Sir Thomas Hoby died there in July. Elizabeth received a touching letter of condolence from Queen Elizabeth I.

Elizabeth had four children by Sir Thomas Hoby: Edward (1560–1617), two girls who both died in childhood in 1571, and then another boy born after Thomas Hoby's death who was called Thomas Posthumus (1566–1640). She built a memorial chapel to her deceased husband in Bisham parish church in Berkshire.

She was married again in 1574, to John, Lord Russell (d. 1584), eldest surviving son and heir to Francis Russell, 2nd Earl of Bedford. She had two daughters by this second marriage, Anne and Elizabeth. A legend says she also had a son whom she so mistreated because of his obstinance at his lessons and blotting his copy-books that he died as the result of her numerous beatings of him, but this cannot be verified. The legend claims her repentant ghost haunts Bisham Abbey. John Russell's death in 1584, before that of his father, robbed her of the possibility of becoming the countess of Bedford. Elizabeth composed a Latin verse epitaph for his monument.

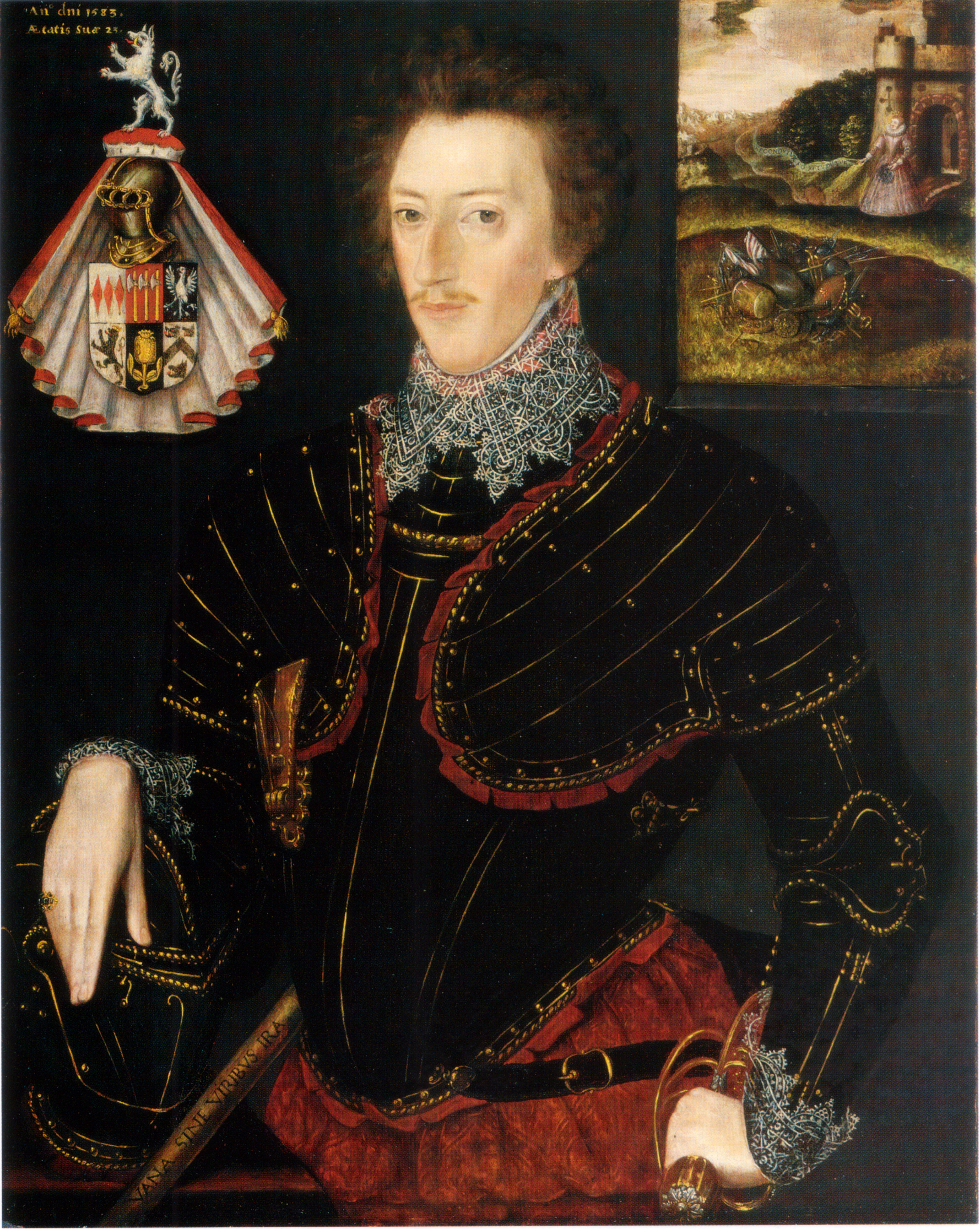
Sir Edward Hoby by an unknown artist, 1583

Through her connections at court, her brother-in-law William Cecil, Lord Burghley, and her nephew Robert Cecil, she became involved in litigation and disputes as she sought favours for herself and friends. Her son Thomas Posthumus became Burghley's protégé. She wrote to Robert Cecil in March 1600, mentioning some of the gifts she had given to Elizabeth I to win her favour. These included clothes made from fabric which had been earmarked for the wedding of Anne of Denmark in 1590, an embroidered canopy, and fine beaver hats with expensive jewels.

She was for a time favoured by the queen and in the summer of 1592 she entertained the monarch at Bisham Abbey for six days. The Privy Council also met there. The queen was reputedly godmother to two of her children. By 1595, however, she found she could only see the queen at church. By June 1600, however, she had regained favour when the queen attended her daughter's wedding at Blackfriars.

Elizabeth Cooke was known for her patronage of musicians, most notably of the composer John Dowland. She also translated A way of reconciliation touching the true nature and substance of the body and blood of Christ in the sacrament (printed in 1605) from the French and composed tomb inscriptions in Greek, Latin and English. She opposed the reconstruction of the Blackfriars Theatre in 1596, as she did not approve of live theatre, given that she was a devout Puritan. She then drew up a petition against the new theatre. As Chris Laoutaris notes in his description of the neighbourhood conflict, Blackfriars was an "upmarket" district. Some of her petition signatories were business colleagues of Shakespeare himself. Ultimately, her plan failed.

By all accounts, Russell also behaved in a similarly fractious manner toward perceived 'rival' property owners in Bedfordshire, who were sometimes kidnapped, hung by their heels, or subjected to document forgery. She seems to have been an ambitious woman, who was zealous in acquiring and protecting her own property, given that she was the first known female keeper of her own castle in England, at Donnington in Berkshire.

Later in life, she became litigious and pursued grievances in law, not always successfully. Elizabeth died at her house at Bisham, Berkshire, and is buried in the 'Hoby Chapel' at All Saints Church, Bisham, where a magnificent monument was erected to her.
