= Thomas Cooke (mayor) =

English merchant and Lord Mayor of London

Sir Thomas Cooke (c. 1410-1478) was an English merchant and Lord Mayor of London.

== Biography ==
He was born the son of Robert Cooke of Lavenham in Suffolk around 1410 and moved to London to become a draper. He was made Sheriff of London for 1453–54, an alderman from 1456 and Member of Parliament for the City of London in 1460 and 1470. He was elected Lord Mayor of London for 1462–63 and knighted in 1465.

In 1467 he began to build a mansion called Gidea Hall, near Romford in Essex, which was only completed by his descendant, Sir Anthony Cooke.

In 1467, he was charged with high treason for lending money to Margaret, the queen of the deposed Lancastrian King Henry VI, on the strength of a confession of a statement obtained under torture from one Hawkins. Chief Justice Markham directed the jury to find it only misprision of treason, whereby Cooke's lands and life were saved, though he was heavily fined and long imprisoned.

While awaiting his trial in the Tower his effects, both at his town house and at Gidea Hall, were seized by Lord Rivers, then treasurer of England, and his wife was committed to the custody of the mayor. On his acquittal he was sent to the Bread Street compter, and afterward to the king's bench, and was kept there until he paid eight thousand pounds to the king and eight hundred pounds to the queen. Lord Rivers and his wife, the Duchess of Bedford, also obtained the dismissal of Markham from his office for having determined that Cooke was not guilty of treason.

=== Death ===
He died in 1478 (aged around 68) and was buried in the church of the Augustine friars, within the ward of Broad Street in London.

He had married Elizabeth, the daughter and coheiress of Alderman Philip Malpas, one of the leaders of the Lancastrian party within the city. They had one daughter and four sons, the eldest of whom was Philip, who was afterwards knighted.

Thomas Cooke's will stated that he owned at least four brewhouses, taverns, and beerhouses, besides fishing-weirs on the Colne, a large farm at Gidea Hall, and numerous properties and manors in London, Surrey, Essex, and Kent.

== See also ==
- List of Sheriffs of the City of London
- List of Lord Mayors of London
- City of London (elections to the Parliament of England)
