= Richard Cooke (MP for Preston) =

16th-century English politician

Richard Cooke (by 1530 – 3 October 1579) was an English politician.

He was the eldest surviving son of Sir Anthony Cooke of Gidea Hall, near Romford, Essex. He succeeded his father in 1576. He was a Groom of the Privy Chamber in 1551. He was elected the Member of Parliament for Stamford in March 1553, Tavistock in 1563 and Preston in 1559.

He married Anne, daughter of John Caulton, by whom he had one son, Anthony (MP for Lymington), and a daughter Philippe (mother of Lady Cornwallis). William Cooke (of Highnam) was a nephew.
