= William Fitzwilliam (Sheriff of London) =

Sir William Fitzwilliam
- Born: c. 1460
- Died: 9 August 1534; St Thomas the Apostle, London
- Buried: Marholm, Northamptonshire
- Spouses: Anne Hawes; Mildred Sackville; Jane Ormond
- Issue: Sir William Fitzwilliam; Richard Fitzwilliam; Christopher Fitzwilliam; Francis Fitzwilliam; Thomas Fitzwilliam; Anne Fitzwilliam; Elizabeth Fitzwilliam; Eleanor Fitzwilliam; Mary Fitzwilliam
- Father: John Fitzwilliam
- Mother: Helen Villiers

Sir William Fitzwilliam (c. 1460 – 9 August 1534) was a Merchant Taylor, Sheriff of London, servant of Cardinal Thomas Wolsey, and a member of the council of Henry VII.

== Biography ==
William Fitzwilliam was the second son of John Fitzwilliam, esquire, of Greens Norton, Northamptonshire, and Helen Villiers, the daughter of William Villiers, esquire, of Brooksby, Leicestershire, by Joan Bellers, the daughter of John Bellers of Eye Kettleby in Melton Mowbray, Leicestershire. William Fitzwilliam had four brothers, John, Bartholomew, Richard and Thomas, and two sisters, Mary, who married Thomas Waddington and Richard Ogle, and Katherine, who married Thomas Rowlston and Richard Francis. Two of his brothers, John and Richard, were London merchants.

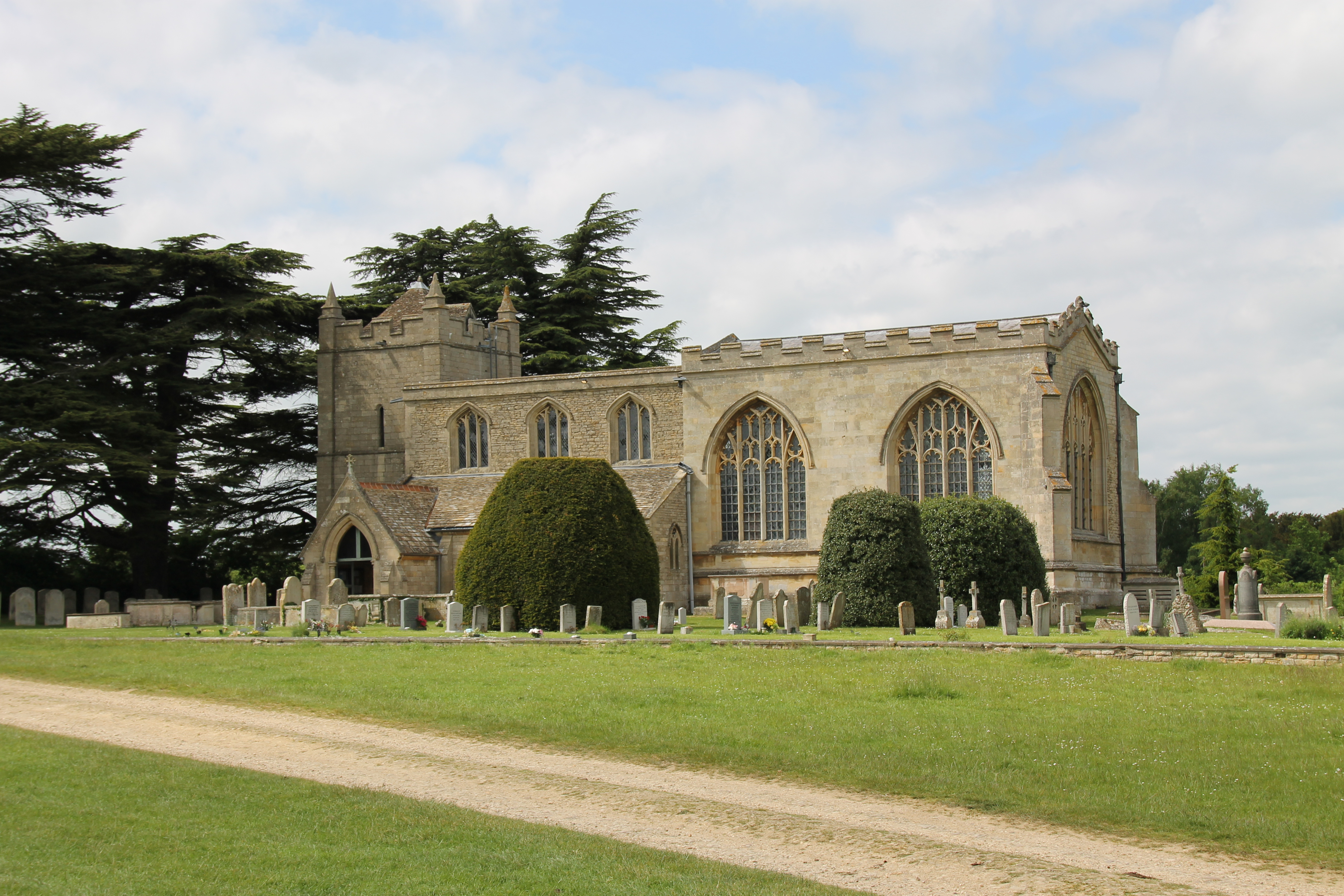
Church of St Mary the Virgin at Marholm where Sir William Fitzwilliam was buried

Fitzwilliam began his career as a London merchant in the service of Sir John Percyvale. He was admitted to the livery of the Worshipful Company of Merchant Taylors in May 1490. He served as Warden in 1494 and 1498, and was elected Master in 1499. He resided in Bread Street ward, and later in St Thomas the Apostle. In addition to his activities as a London merchant, he became a Merchant of the Staple at Calais. In 1503 he was elected alderman for Broad Street ward. In January of that year he was influential in obtaining a new charter for his company which allowed the Merchant Taylors to encroach on the interests of the other London companies. In 1505 he was a candidate for Sheriff of London, but was not elected; in 1506 Henry VII intervened to secure the office for him.

In 1510 the Mayor and Aldermen elected him as Sheriff a second time. He refused to serve, and in consequence was fined 1000 marks and disenfranchised. His franchise was restored and the 1000 mark fine was remitted by the Court of Star Chamber on 10 July 1511; nonetheless, he left his career as a London merchant and entered the service of Cardinal Thomas Wolsey, who had aided him during his quarrel with the City authorities. He became Wolsey's treasurer and high chamberlain, and was appointed to Henry VII's council.

In addition to several properties which he owned in the City of London, he acquired property at Marholm, Cambridgeshire, and a country house at Gaynes Park in Chigwell, Essex. He served as Sheriff of Essex from 1513 to 1515.

In 1515 he was knighted. He had purchased the manor of Milton in Northamptonshire in 1506, and about 1515 went to live there, serving as Sheriff of Northamptonshire in 1523 and 1528. From 1–5 April 1530, after Wolsey's fall from power, Fitzwilliam entertained the Cardinal and his retinue at Milton.

On 26 May 1533 he signed indentures by which the Merchant Taylors were granted 1200 marks to fund religious services at Crowland Abbey and to maintain four Almshouses at Marholm. He also rebuilt the church of St Andrew Undershaft in London, and the chancel of the parish church at Marholm.

He made his will on 28 May 1534, appointing as executors Sir John Baker and Anthony Cooke, as well as his cousins Richard Waddington and Richard Ogle. The will was proved 5 September 1534. He died 9 August 1534 at his mansion house at St Thomas the Apostle in London, and was buried in a marble tomb in the chancel of the church of Marholm.

== Family ==
Fitzwilliam married first Anne, daughter of Sir John Hawes, alderman of London. They had two sons and two daughters:

- William Fitzwilliam, who married Anne Sapcote, and was the father of Sir William Fitzwilliam.
- Richard Fitzwilliam, esquire, who married Elizabeth Knyvet, the daughter of Charles Knyvet, Esquire, the son of Sir William Knyvett by his second wife Lady Joan Stafford, daughter of Humphrey Stafford, 1st Duke of Buckingham
- Anne Fitzwilliam, who married Sir Anthony Cooke. Anne was grandmother of the philosopher and statesman Sir Francis Bacon.
- Elizabeth Fitzwilliam, who married Sir Thomas Brudenell.

Fitzwilliam married secondly Mildred, sister of Sir John Sackville (died 1557), and daughter of Richard Sackville, esquire, of Withyham, Sussex, and Isabel, daughter of John Digges, esquire. They had three sons and two daughters:

- Christopher Fitzwilliam
- Francis Fitzwilliam
- Thomas Fitzwilliam
- Eleanor Fitzwilliam, who married Sir Nicholas Le Strange.
- Mary Fitzwilliam, who married John Shelley.

Fitzwilliam married thirdly Jane, daughter and coheiress of John Ormond, esquire, of Alfreton, Derbyshire, and Joan Chaworth, daughter of Sir William Chaworth. They had no issue. Jane Ormond had previously been the wife of Sir Thomas Dynham (died c. 1520), and of Sir Edward Greville (died 22 June 1528).
