= Marjorie McIntosh (historian) =

American historian of Britain (born 1940)

Marjorie Keniston McIntosh
- Born: 15 November 1940; Ann Arbor, Michigan
- Education: Radcliffe College (B.A.); Harvard University (M.A., Ph.D)
- Occupation: Historian

Marjorie Keniston McIntosh (born 15 November 1940) is an American historian of Britain. Her research focuses on social and economic history, including poor relief, community organization, and the regulation of behavior in late medieval and early modern England. She has taught at the University of Colorado and is the author of several works on English social history.

== Early life and education ==
McIntosh was born in Ann Arbor, Michigan, on 15 November 1940. She graduated from Radcliffe College in 1962 with a B.A. degree magna cum laude in European history. The following year she received a M.A. in English history from Harvard University. McIntosh studied at the Institute of Historical Research in London, England, in 1965–66 and received her Ph.D. in Tudor and Stuart history from Harvard University in 1967.

== Academic career ==
McIntosh was appointed assistant professor of history at the University of Colorado in 1979, promoted to associate professor seven years later, and to full professor in 1992. McIntosh received a Guggenheim Fellowship in 1995 and was named a distinguished professor in history prior to her retirement in 2006.

She founded the Center for British and Irish Studies at the University of Colorado at Boulder and served as its first executive director.

== Research and projects ==
McIntosh has led community-based research initiatives including the Boulder County Latino History Project, which documents Latino participation in the region through oral history and educational outreach. She has also conducted teaching and research in Uganda, including work on gender studies and community history projects based on interviews and visual documentation.

== Scholarship ==
=== Books ===
Selected notable books include:

- A Community Transformed: The Manor and Liberty of Havering, 1500–1620, Cambridge University Press, 1991
- Controlling Misbehavior in England, 1370–1600, Cambridge University Press, 1998
- Autonomy and Community: The Royal Manor of Havering, 1200–1500, Cambridge University Press, 2002.
- Order, Control, and Regulation of Behavior in English Communities, 1350–1600
- Working Women in English Society, 1300–1620, Cambridge University Press, 2005
- Poor Relief in England, 1350–1600, Cambridge University Press, 2011

=== Edited volumes ===
Selected edited works include:

- The Law and Social Change, edited by J. A. Guy, Royal Historical Society (London, England), 1984
- The Locus of Care: Families, Communities, Institutions and the Provision of Welfare since Antiquity, edited by Peregrine Horden and Richard M. Smith, Routledge (London, England), 1998.

=== Articles ===
Her articles have appeared in journals including Speculum and the Journal of British Studies.

== Honors and awards ==
- Harvard Graduate fellow, 1962–64
- Frank Knox Memorial Traveling Fellow, 1965–66
- Howard Foundation Fellow, Brown University, 1976–77
- National Endowment for the Humanities Research Fellow, 1983–84
- John Simon Guggenheim Memorial Foundation Fellow, 1995–96

McIntosh was elected a Fellow of the Royal Historical Society.

== Family ==
McIntosh is married to J. Richard McIntosh, distinguished professor emeritus in molecular, cellular, and developmental biology at the University of Colorado at Boulder. They have two sons and one daughter.
