= Nicholas Bacon (Lord Keeper) =

English politician (1510–1579)

Sir Nicholas Bacon
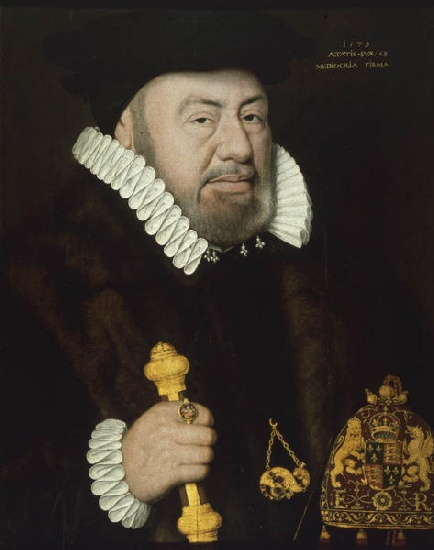
- Sir Nicholas Bacon by an unknown artist, 1579

Lord Keeper of the Great Seal
- In office c. 1558 – c. 1571
- Preceded by: Nicholas Heath, Archbishop of York (Lord Chancellor)
- Succeeded by: Sir Thomas Bromley

Lord Keeper of the Privy Seal
- In office c. 1558 – c. 1579
- Preceded by: William Paget, 1st Baron Paget
- Succeeded by: William Cecil, 1st Baron Burghley

Personal details
- Born: 13 October 1510 Chislehurst, England
- Died: 20 February 1579 (aged 68) London
- Spouse(s): Jane Ferneley; Anne Cooke
- Children: Sir Nicholas Bacon, 1st Baronet, of Redgrave; Sir Edward Bacon; Sir Nathaniel Bacon; Elizabeth Bacon; Anne Bacon; Elizabeth Bacon (again); Anthony Bacon; Sir Francis Bacon
- Parent(s): Robert Bacon, Isabel Cage

Arms of Bacon: Gules, on a chief argent two mullets pierced sable

Sir Nicholas Bacon (28 December 1510 – 20 February 1579) was Lord Keeper of the Great Seal during the first half of the reign of Queen Elizabeth I of England. He was the father of the philosopher and statesman Sir Francis Bacon.

== Life ==
He was born at Chislehurst, Kent, the second son of Robert Bacon (1479–1548) of Drinkstone, Suffolk, by his wife Eleanor (Isabel) Cage.

He graduated from Corpus Christi College, Cambridge in 1527. The college law society at Corpus, the Nicholas Bacon Law Society, founded in 1972, is named after him.

There is a story that he evaded ordination by going into hiding "with the help of a rich uncle", and he seems to have entered an Inn of Chancery before being admitted to Gray's Inn five years later after a period in Paris; he was called to the Bar in 1533.

Following the Dissolution of the Monasteries, Henry VIII gave him a grant of the manors of Redgrave, Botesdale and Gislingham in Suffolk, and Gorhambury, Hertfordshire. Gorhambury belonged to St Albans Abbey and lay near the site of the vanished Roman city of Verulamium (modern day St Albans). From 1563 to 1568 he built a new house, Old Gorhambury House (now a ruin), which later became the property of Francis Bacon, his youngest son, who also built a nearby property, Verulam House, to his own designs.

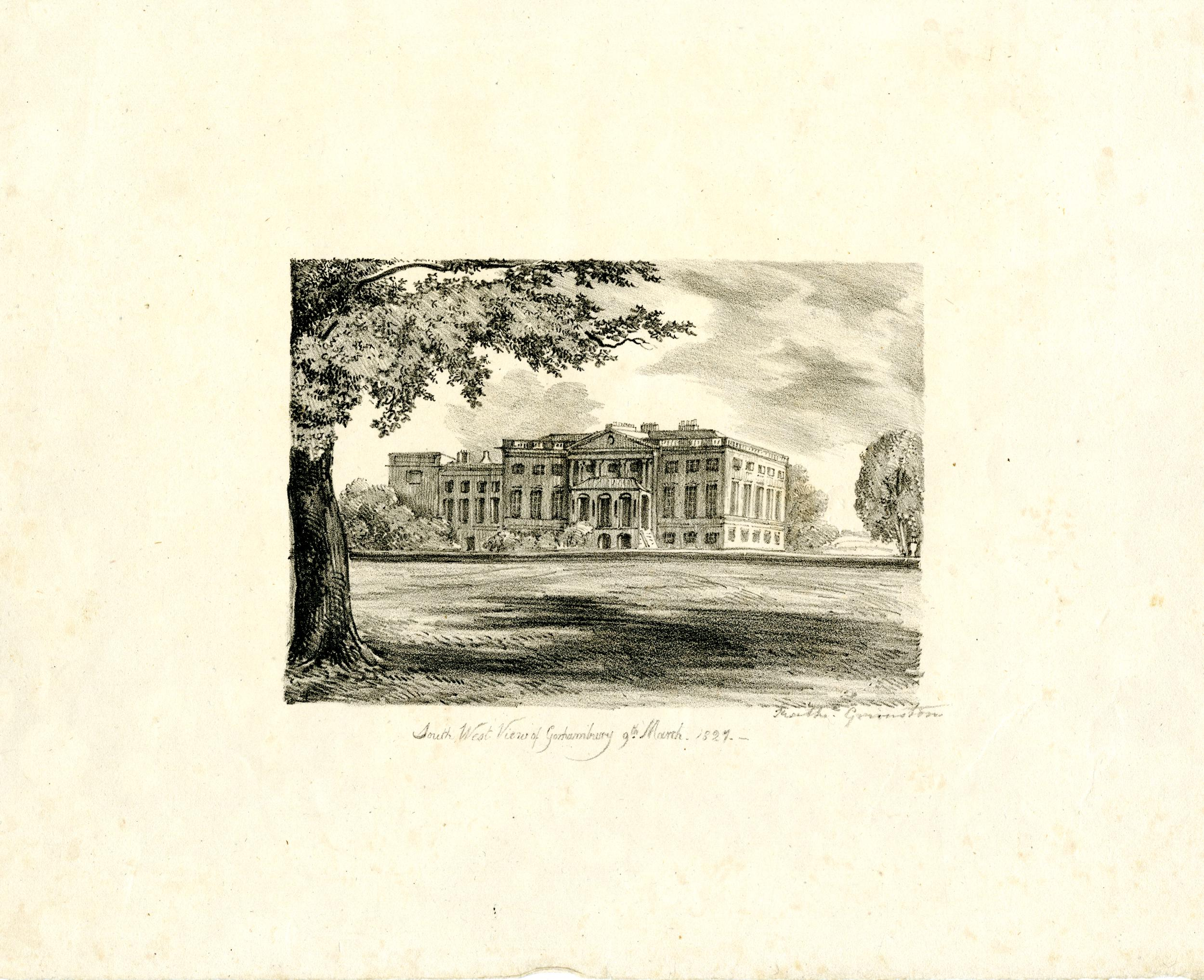
Gorhambury House, remaining

In 1545 he became a Member of Parliament, representing Dartmouth. The following year, he was made Attorney of the Court of Wards and Liveries, a prestigious and lucrative post, and by 1552 he had risen to become treasurer of Gray's Inn.

As a Protestant, he lost preferment under Queen Mary I. However, on the accession of her younger sister Elizabeth in 1558, he was appointed Lord Keeper of the Great Seal, largely owing to the influence of his brother-in-law William Cecil. Shortly afterwards, Bacon was knighted.

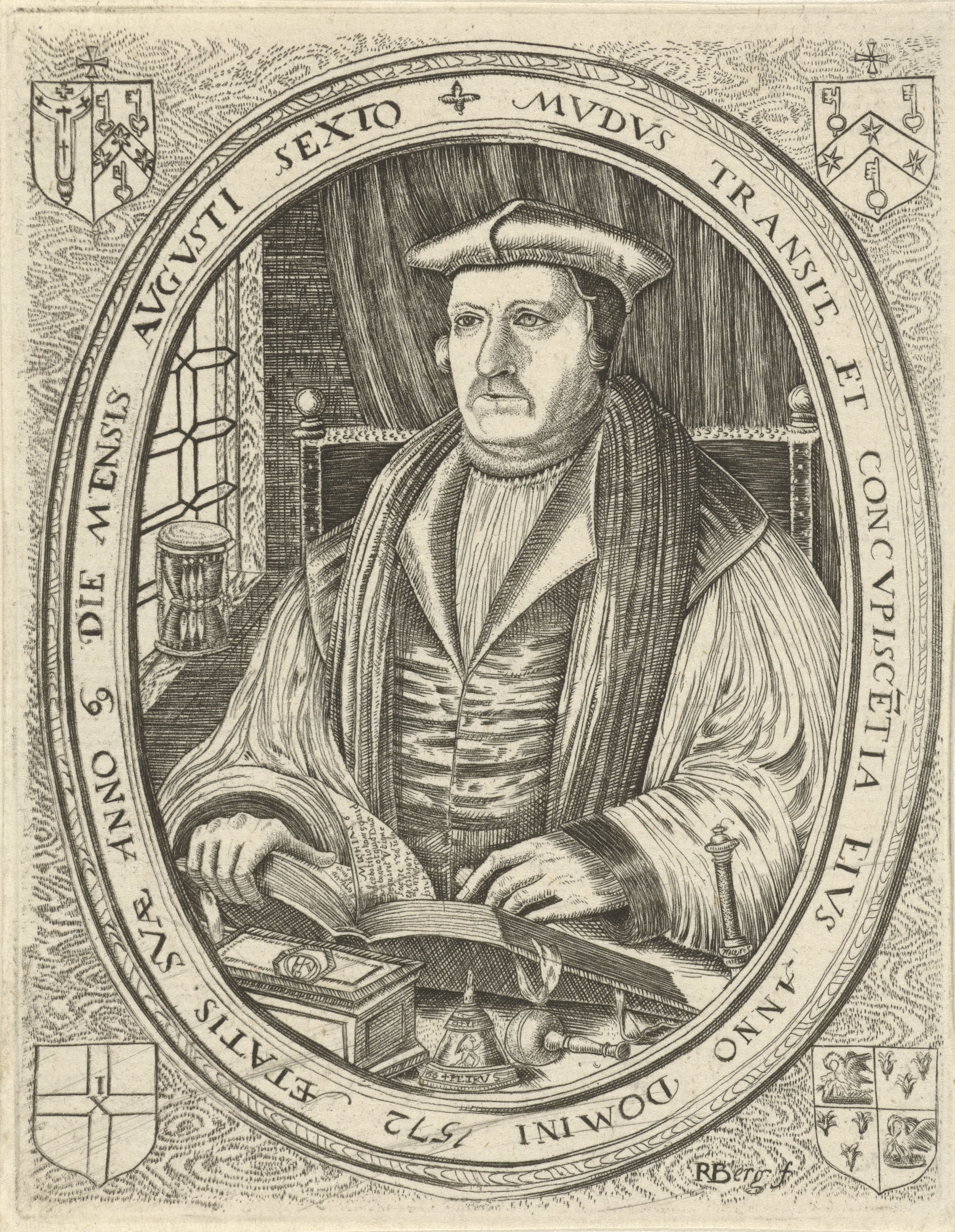
Matthew Parker, a close friend of Bacon's

Bacon helped secure the position of Archbishop of Canterbury for his friend Matthew Parker, and in his official capacity presided over the House of Lords when Elizabeth opened her first parliament. Though an implacable enemy of Mary, Queen of Scots, he opposed Cecil's policy of war against France, on financial grounds; but he favoured closer links with foreign Protestants, and was aware of the threat to England from the alliance between France and Scotland. In 1559 he was authorized to exercise the full jurisdiction of Lord Chancellor. In 1564 he fell temporarily into the royal disfavour and was dismissed from court, because Elizabeth suspected he was concerned in the publication of a pamphlet, A Declaration of the Succession of the Crowne Imperial of Ingland, by John Hales, which favoured the claim of Lady Katherine Grey (sister of Lady Jane Grey) to the English throne.

Bacon's innocence having been admitted, he was restored to favour, and replied to a writing by Sir Anthony Browne, who had again asserted the rights of the House of Suffolk, to which Lady Katherine belonged. He thoroughly distrusted Mary, Queen of Scots; objected to the proposal to marry her to Thomas Howard, 4th Duke of Norfolk; and warned Elizabeth that serious consequences for England would follow her restoration. He seems to have disliked the proposed marriage between the English queen and Francis, Duke of Anjou, and his distrust of the Roman Catholics and the French was increased by the St Bartholomew's Day massacre. As a loyal English churchman he was ceaselessly interested in ecclesiastical matters, and made suggestions for the better observation of doctrine and discipline in the church.

== Death and legacy ==
He died in London and was buried in Old St Paul's Cathedral; there were many tributes to him. His grave and monument were destroyed in the Great Fire of London in 1666. A modern monument in the crypt lists his as one of the important graves lost.

He had been an eloquent speaker, a learned lawyer, a generous friend; and his interest in education led him to make several gifts and bequests for educational purposes, including the foundation of a free grammar school at Redgrave in Suffolk.

== Marriages and issue ==
Nicholas Bacon's first marriage was to Jane Ferneley (d.1552). Nicholas and Jane had six surviving children, three sons and three daughters:

- Sir Nicholas Bacon, 1st Baronet, of Redgrave (c.1540–1624), who married Anne Butts, the only child and daughter of Edmund Butts (a son of Sir William Butts, doctor to King Henry VIII) by his wife Anne Bures, (whose inscribed ledger stone is in Redgrave Church) one of the daughters and co-heiresses of Henry Bures (d.1528) of Acton, Suffolk. Anne Butts was the heir of her uncle Sir William Butts (d.1583), junior, of Thornage, Norfolk, Sheriff of Norfolk and Suffolk in 1563, whose Easter Sepulchre monument survives in Thornage Church. Three of the daughters and co-heiresses of Henry Bures married three of the sons of Sir William Butts, senior.
- Sir Nathaniel Bacon (c.1546 – November 1622), who first married, in July 1569, Anne Gresham (d.1594), the illegitimate daughter of Sir Thomas Gresham, founder of the Royal Exchange, by Anne Dutton; secondly, on 21 July 1597 he married Dorothy Hopton (c.1570–1629), daughter of Arthur Hopton and widow of William Smith of Burgh Castle, Suffolk.
- Edward Bacon (1548/9 – 1618), who married Helen Little, the daughter of Sir Thomas Little of Bray, Berkshire, by Elizabeth Lyton (daughter of Sir Robert Lyton of Knebworth, Hertfordshire), by whom he was the father of Nathaniel Bacon (1593–1660) and Francis Bacon (1600–1663).
- Elizabeth Bacon, who married:
  1. Sir Robert Doyley;
  2. Sir Henry Neville,
  3. Sir William Peryam.
- Anne Bacon, who married Sir Henry Woodhouse (d.1624), by whom she was the mother of Sir Henry Woodhouse.
- Elizabeth Bacon, who married:
  1. Francis Wyndham, the son of Sir Edmund Wyndham.,
  2. Robert Mansell

Sir Nicholas Bacon's second marriage, in 1553, was to Anne Cooke (1528–1610), one of the daughters of Sir Anthony Cooke, by whom he had two sons:

- Anthony Bacon (1558–1601)
- Francis Bacon (1561–1626), who became Lord Chancellor and was also a philosopher, author and scientist.

Jane's widowed younger sister, Anne Ferneley (d.1596), married secondly in 1544 to Sir Thomas Gresham.

== Notes ==
Political offices
Preceded by The Lord Paget	Lord Privy Seal; 1558–1571	Succeeded by The Lord Burghley
Preceded by Nicholas Heath (Lord Chancellor)	Lord Keeper; 1558–1579	Succeeded by Sir Thomas Bromley (Lord Chancellor)
