= Gidea Hall =

Manor house in Essex, England

Coordinates: 51°35′16″N 0°11′39″E

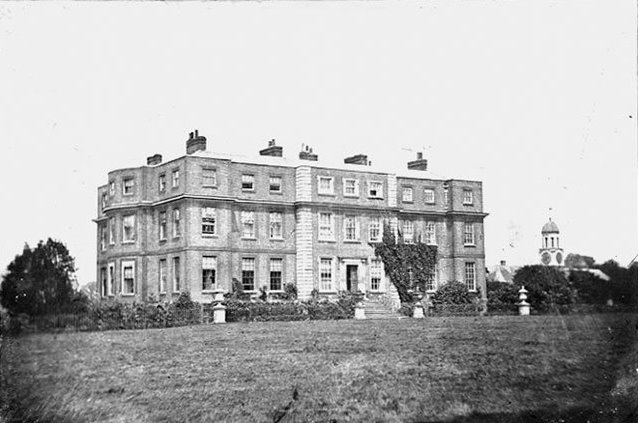
Gidea Hall in 1908; it was demolished in 1930

Gidea Hall was a manor house in Gidea Park, in the historic Royal Liberty of Havering, whose former area today is part of the north-eastern extremity of Greater London.

The first record of Gidea Hall is in 1250, and by 1410 it was in the hands of one Robert Chichele. In 1452 Sir Thomas Cooke (c.1410-1478), a Lord Mayor of London, bought the estate and in 1466 was granted a licence to crenellate, which is a licence for the manor house to be fortified. Gidea Hall was forfeit when Cooke was accused of treason, but he was acquitted and the property recovered after payment of a fine. While work on the manor had started in 1466 with the construction of a moat, they were continued by his son Sir Anthony Cooke, one of whose daughters married Sir Nicholas Bacon and came into possession of the Manor of Marks, another large house in the Liberty of Havering. After his return from exile Cooke entertained Queen Elizabeth I at Gidea Hall during her Progress in 1568 when she also visited Copt Hall The final alterations to Gidea Hall were not finished until 1568 at which time the main house and two adjacent wings formed three sides of a courtyard with an open colonnade on the fourth side and various outbuildings. Maria de Medici, the mother-in-law of King Charles I stayed at Gidea Hall in 1638 on her way from Harwich to London, although by then the hall was falling into decay. By the time of the Commonwealth the buildings were ruinous, but were not finally demolished until 1720 when Sir John Eyles had a new mansion built on the site.

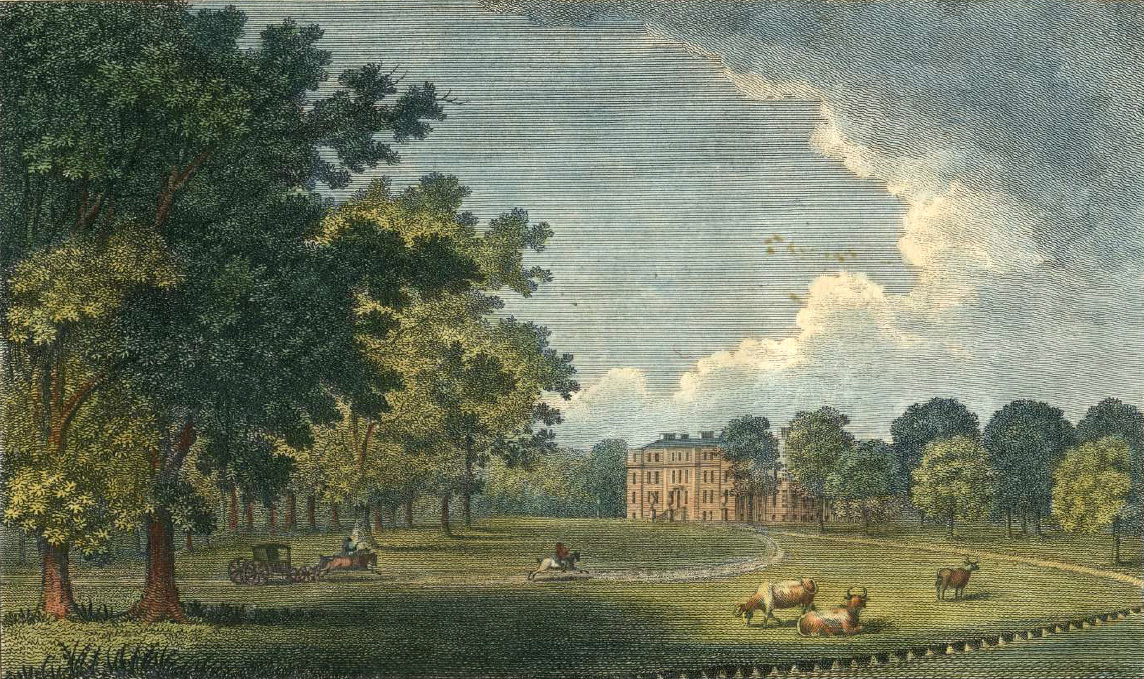

In 1783 a book entitled An enquiry by experiment into the properties and effects of the medicinal waters in the County of Essex includes an entry for "Gidea Hall water", describing the source as rising on the "bank of the canal in the park of Richard Benyon, Esq". The canal referred to is now the lake in Raphael Park, which was recorded on the 1888 Ordnance Survey map as Black's Canal after the Black family; a map prepared for Alexander Black in 1807 clearly shows the spring. An investigation into the spring in 1910 recorded that it had "been drained, filled up and turfed about 4 years ago". The later Gidea Hall was of brick.

The Gidea Hall estate was purchased in 1897 by Herbert Raphael, and in 1902 he gave 20 acres (81,000 m^{2}), including a lake, for use as a public park; a further 55 acres (220,000 m^{2}) was subsequently purchased and Raphael Park opened in 1904. In 1910 Raphael and two fellow Liberal MPs formed Gidea Park Ltd with the aim of building a garden suburb, including what became Romford Garden Suburb, on the Gidea Hall and Balgores estates, and during the First World War they offered both properties to the Artists Rifles for use as an Officers' School. The house was demolished in 1930.

The wall, railings and gate from the early 18th century remain and are listed Grade II on the National Heritage List for England.
