= Royal Liberty School =

The Royal Liberty School
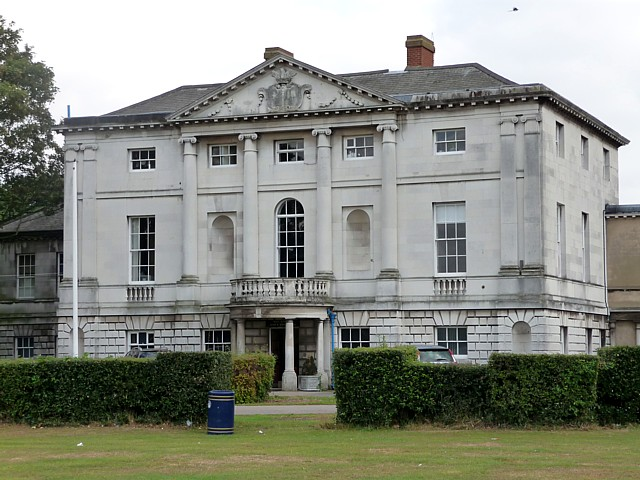

Location
- Gidea Park, London; England; 51°35′08″N 0°12′35″E

Information
- Type: Academy
- Motto: Semper procedens
- Established: 1921
- Local authority: Havering
- Trust: SFAET
- Department for Education URN: 143877 Tables
- Ofsted: Reports
- Executive headteacher: Paul Ward
- Headteacher: Lee Raftery
- Gender: Boys
- Age: 11 to 16
- Enrolment: 630
- Houses: Eagle, Hawk, Kestrel, Falcon, Osprey
- Colours: Blue and Yellow
- Website: http://www.royalliberty.co.uk

The Royal Liberty School is a secondary school for boys aged 11 to 16, located in Gidea Park in the London Borough of Havering, England.

The school is situated on Upper Brentwood Road about 400 metres north of Gidea Park railway station, and approximately halfway between Gidea Park and Ardleigh Green to the north-east of Romford. It is in the parish of St. Michael & All Angels, Gidea Park.

== History ==
=== Grammar school ===
The school was founded in 1921 in the buildings at the grounds of Hare Hall and takes its name from the Royal Liberty of Havering. During this period an ornate koi pond was located within its grounds. It was once a traditional English grammar school, and also had a sixth form until 1992. In 2017 the school joined the Success for all Education trust.

The Royal Liberty was the first school in Europe to install an electronic computer (an Elliott 903, similar to the 920 military version) in 1965.

As a grammar school, it operated a squadron of the Combined Cadet Force (CCF), incorporating basic, army, navy, and air cadets (including a training glider).

=== Comprehensive school ===
- 1974 – In accord with government policy, and in spite of manifest opposition, the school converts from a grammar to comprehensive school.
- 1989 – J. P. Coles, retired as headmaster after 25 years of service, with L. B. Thomas subsequently promoted from deputy head to headmaster.
- 1988 – The sixth form was twinned with the nearby Frances Bardsley Academy for Girls.
- 1992 – The sixth form was abolished.
- 1996 – School was placed into Ofsted special measures. L. B. Thomas left and S. Berwitz was appointed head.
- 2000 – School removed from special measures.
- 2001 – School cited by Ofsted as "one of the most improved schools in the UK".
- 2003 – Julia Deery was appointed head.
- 2004 – Bid launched for specialist school status, hoping to attract additional government funds.
- 2006 – School wins bid and becomes a Science College.
- 2014 – Julia Deery leaves, with April Saunders becoming head.
- 2017 – School coverts to academy status and joins the Success for all education trust
- 2022 - April Saunders leaves, with Lee Raftery becoming head.

== Houses ==
The school's houses were previously known as Danes, Normans, Romans and Saxons. Then there was a period when they were known as Darwin, Newton, Rutherford and Salk. They were then changed to Discovery, Challenger, Endeavour, Voyager and Apollo to reflect the school's status as a Science College. In the academic year of 2023, the names were changed to birds of prey: Apollo to Hawk, Challenger to Eagle, Discovery to Osprey Endeavour to Kestrel and Voyager to Falcon.

== Notable former pupils ==
- Norman Baker, Lib Dem MP for Lewes from 1997 until 2015
- Berwyn, Trinidad-born rapper, producer and songwriter
- Graham Bond, rock musician
- Nick Butterworth, author and illustrator of children's books
- Andy Day, actor and children's TV presenter for CBeebies. Star of Andy's Wild Adventures
- Ken Farnes, England cricket fast bowler
- Doug Fisher, actor, Man about the House, London's Burning, The Bitch
- Alistair Green, actor and comedian
- Mick Inkpen, author and illustrator of children's books
- Sir Alex Jarratt CB, chancellor from 1983 to 2002 of the University of Birmingham and president from 1979 to 1983 of the Advertising Association
- Francis Jones MBE, president from 1977 to 1981 of the Engineering Industries Association, co-developer of OBOE bombing system.
- Arthur Latham, Labour MP from 1969 to 1974 for Paddington North and from 1974 to 1979 for Paddington
- Sir Timothy O'Shea, principal and vice-chancellor from 2002 to 2018 of the University of Edinburgh
- Andrew Clennel Palmer FRS, pipeline engineer
- Jeff Randall, journalist and business editor of the BBC from 2001 to 2005
- Prof John Saville, historian, professor of economic and social history from 1972 to 1982 at the University of Hull
- Michael Ward, Labour MP for Peterborough from 1974 to 1979
