= List of Kipper episodes =

Kipper is a British preschool animated children's television series based on the characters from Mick Inkpen's Kipper the Dog picture book series. It ran from for six seasons from 5 September 1997 to 21 December 2000. The series premiered in the United States on Nick Jr. in February 1999.

== Series overview ==
Series	Episodes	Originally released	
Series	Episodes	First released	Last released
1	13	5 September 1997	28 November 1997
2	13	24 September 1998	17 December 1998
3	13	21 January 1999	15 April 1999
4	13	23 September 1999	16 December 1999
5	13	20 January 2000	13 April 2000
6	13	28 September 2000	21 December 2000

== Episodes ==
=== Series 1 (1997) ===
No.	Title	Character(s) Appearing	Written by	Original airdate (UK)
1	"The Visitor"	Gosling	Mick Inkpen	5 September 1997
Kipper lets a lost gosling stay at his house during a thunderstorm, and they soon become friends.
2	"The Umbrella"	Tiger, The Ducks	Bob Baker	12 September 1997
Kipper tries to use an umbrella to act as a "fishing rod", and an adventure ensues.
3	"The Seaside"	Tiger	Mick Inkpen	19 September 1997
Kipper and Tiger take a trip to the seaside. When Tiger gets stranded out at sea, it is up to Kipper to rescue him before it's too late.
4	"Nothing Ever Happens"	Tiger, Mouse, Magic Rabbits	Mick Inkpen	26 September 1997
Kipper is bored on a rainy day. He finds a magic set in the attic, and adorable magic ensues.
5	"Pig's Present"	Tiger, Pig, Jake, Holly (mentioned), Sammy (mentioned), Roly-Poly the Hamster	Mick Inkpen	3 October 1997
Kipper has the perfect gift for his good friend Pig, a hamster named Roly-Poly. But Kipper's attachment to the hamster makes him unwilling to give up the cute little critter.
6	"The Rainbow Puddle"	Magic Frog, Elephant (briefly)	Mick Inkpen	10 October 1997
Kipper tries to help an old frog find his way home.
7	"The Butterfly"	Pig, Butterfly, Baby	Mick Inkpen	17 October 1997
Kipper learns about blending and mixing colours while trying to catch a real butterfly.
8	"The Bleepers"	The Bleepers, Grasshopper	Mick Inkpen	24 October 1997
Kipper tries to fix the Bleepers' spaceship to help the Bleepers themselves return home to the moon.
9	"Snowy Day"	Tiger	Mick Inkpen	31 October 1997
Kipper and Tiger enjoy a fun-filled day of playing in the snow before building a snow-dog. Note: At the end of this episode, Kipper acts as a Narrator.
10	"Pig's Cousin"	Pig, Arnold, The Ducks	Mick Inkpen	7 November 1997
Kipper and Pig take Pig's cousin Arnold to the park, but Arnold only wants to feed the ducks.
11	"The Paddling Pool"	None	Mick Inkpen	14 November 1997
On a warm sunny Summer's day, Kipper gets out his inflatable paddling pool before setting it up in his garden. When the paddling pool has "a puncture", he uses a pair of sticky plasters to fix the leak and solve the problem. Unfortunately, for Kipper, it is not too long before it rains with hailstones and the paddling pool itself springs a second leak without warning. Note: This is the only episode with no other characters besides Kipper appearing.
12	"Tiger's Torch"	Tiger	Mick Inkpen	21 November 1997
Tiger gets "a brand new torch", so he and Kipper go camping in the woods to use it. They both read a scary story, and soon, they hear a very strange sound and they go and look for it and they hear an owl make the sound and they get scared and run back into their tent. Then, Tiger finds a young snail's shadow scaring him. Note: This episode is adapted from the storybook, "Kipper's Monster".
13	"The Conker Tree"	Tiger, Pig, Arnold, Kitten	Mick Inkpen	28 November 1997
Kipper, Tiger, Pig, and Arnold find a friendly kitten stuck high up in a tree and help it to get down.

=== Series 2 (1998) ===
No.	Title	Character(s) Appearing	Written by	Original airdate (UK)
14	"The Goldfish"	Tiger, Goldfish, Tadpole	Matthew Westwood	24 September 1998
Kipper finds a goldfish, and tries to take great care of it while his good friend, Tiger, is on holiday.
15	"Sleepless Night"	Tiger	Matthew Westwood	1 October 1998
Kipper has a hard time sleeping one night due to a brief thunderstorm and a couple of phone calls from his best friend, Tiger.
16	"The Camping Trip"	Tiger, The Rabbits	George Tarry	8 October 1998
Kipper and Tiger go on a camping trip. When it rains, however, the tent collapses without warning and blows away. The only shelter that Kipper and Tiger both have is a nearby rabbit hole.
17	"The Igloo"	Tiger, Pig, Arnold	Matthew Westwood	15 October 1998
Kipper and Tiger build an igloo one cool Winter's day, but when Pig and his cousin Arnold arrive, Pig discovers that he is too big to fit in it. Then, it rains with "hailstones" and the gang has to have fun with some umbrellas. When the rain finally stops, however, the igloo collapses in the sunlight, forcing Arnold to have his own "igloo" home.
18	"Hiccups"	Tiger, Pig, Arnold, Jake	Dave Ingham	22 October 1998
Poor Kipper gets really bad hiccups one warm Summer's day while having some quiet time in his inflatable paddling pool in his garden. His friends, first Pig, then Jake, and finally Tiger gives him various suggestions on how to cure them, like standing upside-down and "singing a song" and "drinking a glass of water from the wrong side", that is, until an unexpected and noisy surprise cures the hiccups forever.
19	"The Little Ghost"	Tiger, Little Ghost	Dave Ingham	29 October 1998
A ghost visits Kipper's house one night, but as he tells Kipper, he is not very scary, so Kipper offers to make him scary, using only Tiger.
20	"Space Invaders"	Pig, Arnold, Spaceship	George Tarry	5 November 1998
Kipper finds what seems to be a toy spaceship, but he never discovers that it is very real, much to Pig and Arnold's frustration.
21	"The Magnifying Glass"	Pig, Arnold, Butterfly	James Mason	12 November 1998
Kipper looks at things one beautiful day with his magnifying glass and becomes distraught when he suddenly loses it. Then, a lost Arnold finds what he thinks is a lollipop that happens not to taste very good at all.
22	"Kipper Is Unwell"	Tiger, Pig, Arnold, Jake	Dave Ingham	19 November 1998
Everybody thinks that Kipper is feeling sick, all because he has several big red circles all over his face from an accident while painting "a big red rocket" on a piece of paper earlier on.
23	"The Nest"	Tiger, Pig, Arnold, Baby Bird	George Tarry	26 November 1998
Kipper and Tiger help a baby bird to get back up into a tree, and they make their very own nest together.
24	"The Magic Lamp"	Tiger, Dragon	George Tarry	3 December 1998
Kipper finds an old bike headlight that grants every wish that both he and Tiger make. They find a mysterious-looking door behind Tiger's wallpaper, go up an extremely high staircase, and also go on a wild roller coaster ride that takes them to a planet where a very scary dragon lives.
25	"The Gismo"	Tiger, Magic Frog	James Mason	10 December 1998
Kipper and Tiger go to the duck pond to sail Tiger's new toy boat, but the boat itself suddenly gets stuck amongst some lily pads. A hair dryer does come in to help to solve the problem, though.
26	"Kipper's Circus"	Tiger, Pig, Arnold	George Tarry	17 December 1998
Kipper and Tiger play circus, and can do pretty much everything perceiving to it except doing a handstand. Pig and Arnold are the exact opposite.

=== Series 3 (1999) ===
No.	Title	Character(s) Appearing	Written by	Original airdate (UK)
27	"The Lost Mug"	Pig, Arnold, Squirrel	James Mason	21 January 1999
Arnold loses his red mug in the woods, so he, Kipper, and Pig set out to find it. Soon, Arnold meets a squirrel who happily drops some acorns on passing people.
28	"The Rescue"	Tiger, Pig, Arnold	James Mason	28 January 1999
Arnold finds an old pedalboat at the beach, and, regardless of how small he is, he desperately wants a ride on it. He eventually gets his chance when both Kipper and Tiger get marooned on a desert island in the middle of the sea.
29	"The Picnic"	Tiger, Pig, Arnold, The Ants, The Ducks, The Wasps	Dave Ingham	4 February 1999
When summer comes to an end Tiger asks Kipper if they would like to have a picnic however things to go to plan Pig and Arnold squish the picnic while flying a kite. Ants crawl on Kipper and Tiger and the Ducks eat the food. They try to have a jam sandwich but wasps attack. Pig and Arnold try to eat the food when they explain about the kite in the apple tree. Kipper and Tiger finally get a picnic and have apples.
30	"The Treasure Hunt"	Tiger, Pig, Arnold	Dave Ingham	11 February 1999
Kipper and Tiger decide to go on a treasure hunt with Tiger's metal detector, but they can find no real treasure besides a screw, a water pipe, and Arnold's lost toys, including a car.
31	"Jake's Bird"	Pig, Jake, Fluff, Squeak	Dave Ingham	18 February 1999
Pig accidentally causes Jake's bird, Fluff, to go missing.
32	"The Dinosaur"	Tiger, Pig, Arnold	James Mason	25 February 1999
Kipper and Tiger are led to believe that there's a real dinosaur in the park.
33	"Tiger's Sledge"	Tiger, Pig, Arnold	Dave Ingham	4 March 1999
Tiger gets a new sledge, so Kipper and Tiger go for a ride on it.
34	"The Swimming Pool"	Tiger, Pig, Arnold	James Mason	11 March 1999
Kipper, Tiger, Pig, and Arnold all go to the swimming pool with a wave machine, but Tiger is not getting into the water due to his poor swimming ability. As he tells Kipper, he has to "wear water wings".
35	"Arnold's Balloon Trip"	Tiger, Pig, Arnold	George Tarry	18 March 1999
Arnold is blown away on a big red balloon to an ice cream mountain high up in the sky, so Kipper, Tiger, and Pig try their best to rescue him. Note: This episode was the extra episode on the exclusive WHSmith version of the 1999 Christmas Eve and Other Stories VHS tape release.
36	"The Magic Act"	Tiger, Pig, Arnold	George Tarry	25 March 1999
Kipper does a magic act and makes everyone, including himself, think that he has made Arnold disappear for good.
37	"Cakes and Tails"	Tiger, Pig	George Tarry	1 April 1999
Kipper and Tiger cannot find Pig when they plan to meet him at the park. They are getting anxious, because Pig has a cake with him. They also have been talking about beasts.
38	"The Long Walk"	Tiger, Bull	Dave Ingham	8 April 1999
Kipper and Tiger get lost on a nature walk, and Tiger's new coat, which is supposed to help, is not helping whatsoever.
39	"Christmas Eve"	Tiger, Pig, Arnold, Mouse	Mick Inkpen	15 April 1999
Kipper gives his friends some Christmas gifts and picks out the perfect Christmas tree in the woods.

=== Series 4 (1999) ===
No.	Title	Character(s) Appearing	Written by	Original airdate (UK)
40	"Surprise Party"	Tiger, Pig, Arnold, Jake	Dave Ingham	23 September 1999
Jake can't believe that all his friends have forgotten his birthday. Luckily, Kipper arrives and just cannot keep a secret.
41	"The Ball"	Tiger, Pig, Arnold	James Mason	30 September 1999
Kipper gets a knock at the front door, he finds a ball that is no ordinary ball and seems to have a life of its own. Note: This episode was the bonus episode on the Marks and Spencer exclusive version of the 2000 Kipper - Looking After Arnold and Other Stories VHS tape.
42	"Pirates"	Tiger, Pig	George Tarry	7 October 1999
Kipper and Tiger play pirates on an island with a spooky surprise.
43	"Tiger's Cold"	Tiger, Pig, Arnold	Dave Ingham	14 October 1999
Kipper visits Tiger, who is in bed with a nasty cold. Tiger is a demanding patient, and none of the things Kipper has brought to cheer him up seem to work. In the end, Kipper calls Pig and Arnold in to give the patient some of his medicine.
44	"Looking After Arnold"	Pig, Arnold	George Tarry	21 October 1999
Kipper is babysitting Arnold, who Pig has assured him is very tired and will not be in any trouble at all. Kipper makes Arnold a house under the table, reads to him, and even turns a cardboard box into a pretend train. By the time Pig returns, it's just Kipper who cannot keep both his small, black eyes open.
45	"The Mouse"	Mouse (female)	Dave Ingham	28 October 1999
Kipper cannot understand where the contents of his cereal packet have gone to, or why his six toys are littered all over the place when he knows he put them all safely away. Then he discovers he has got a little visitor, Mouse, (voiced by Julia Sawalha) and life may never be the same again.
46	"Clouds"	Pig, Arnold, Cloud Rabbit	George Tarry	4 November 1999
Kipper and Pig see kangaroos and helicopters in the cloud shapes. Suddenly, Arnold walks up a rainbow and Kipper has to go and find him before he gets completely lost.
47	"Crazy Golf"	Tiger, Pig, Arnold	Dave Ingham	11 November 1999
Tiger wants to show everyone how good he is at crazy golf. He is a bit upset when Kipper manages to get the ball through a gap in the windmill, and he does not.
48	"Echo Echo"	Pig, Jake, Henry, The Ducks, Pig's aunt (mentioned)	George Tarry	18 November 1999
Kipper meets a chatty parrot, called Henry, belonging to Pig's aunt, who is on holiday.
49	"The Big Freeze"	Tiger, The Ducks	James Mason	25 November 1999
Kipper helps some friendly ducks when their pond freezes over in the middle of Winter.
50	"Jake's Friend"	Tiger, Pig, Arnold, Jake	Dave Ingham	2 December 1999
Jake has an invisible friend called "Wilbur".
51	"The Fair"	Pig, Arnold	James Mason	9 December 1999
Kipper, Pig, and Arnold go to a busy fair. It is Pig who gets lost, not Arnold.
52	"Big Owl's Bath"	Tiger	James Mason	16 December 1999
Kipper and Tiger decide to bathe all their things on a windy day, but, outside, the wild weather is gradually making everything more and more ruined for both of them.

=== Series 5 (2000) ===
No.	Title	Character(s) Appearing	Written by	Original airdate (UK)
53	"Tiger's Joke Box"	Tiger, Pig, Arnold, Jake	Dave Ingham	20 January 2000
Tiger gets a joke box and plays some jokes on his friends he leaves a present on Kipper's door and he gets a fright when it's a Jack in the box. Tiger then goes into Jake's house who's about to have breakfast and leaves a whoopee cushion under his chair. Tiger meets Pig and Arnold in the park and gives Pig blue sweets and gets blue on his mouth. Then gives Kipper a telescope and gets a black eye. Then pours itch powder on Jake who's eating an apple so Kipper, Pig, Jake and Arnold play a joke on Tiger as payback with a whoopee cushion with cold water.
54	"Tiger's Rocket"	Tiger, Pig, Arnold, The Ducks	Dave Ingham	27 January 2000
Tiger is very excited when his brand new rocket arrives. He is not so excited when the rocket refuses to rise from its launching spot on the top of Big Hill, but, with a bit of help from Kipper and Sock Thing, everything works out fine.
55	"The Jumble Sale"	Tiger, Pig, Arnold	John Grace	3 February 2000
Pig suggests Kipper takes some of his unwanted things to a jumble sale taking place in the park. He points out that if Kipper gets rid of old stuff, then he will have more room for some brand new stuff. Kipper is almost convinced, until he realises that his precious comic books have to go.
56	"Water Water Everywhere"	Tiger, Pig, Arnold, Frog	George Tarry	10 February 2000
Kipper and his best friend, Tiger, are having great fun with the hosepipe and inflatable paddling pool. Unfortunately, Tiger fails to attach the hosepipe itself to the tap properly, and before he knows it, there is water water everywhere. When Pig and Arnold arrive, Pig accidentally opens the back door without warning, and the water escapes from the house.
57	"Pig's Shop"	Tiger, Pig, Arnold, Jake	Dave Ingham	17 February 2000
Pig sets up a candy shop with Arnold as his assistant. Kipper says that he would like one of each, but Pig wants to be paid. He says he shall take a conker in exchange for a gobstopper. But he is made the exact same offer to Tiger, and in a game of conkers with Kipper, it turns out that Tiger's champion conker is, in fact, a gobstopper on a string.
58	"Hide and Seek"	Mouse	Dave Ingham	24 February 2000
Kipper plays a game of hide-and-seek with Mouse in his home. When the game begins, however, Mouse says that she cannot count past 5, so Kipper tries his best to help her count further. By the end of the game, Mouse counts all the way up to 10, in order, and finds Kipper hiding in a cardboard box!
59	"The Costume Party"	Tiger, Pig, Arnold, Jake	Dave Ingham	2 March 2000
Tiger decides to invite everyone that he knows to his costume party. Kipper, Pig, and Jake do not know what Tiger is going to be dressed up as, but as the invitation says, no one is to go to the party itself dressed up as a pirate.
60	"Hedgehog Watch"	Tiger, Hedgehog	John Grace	9 March 2000
Tiger is spending one night at Kipper's house. They are on Hedgehog Watch, but every time the hedgehog turns up for them, they are doing something else, and they do not see him. Then, they find a bite taken out of a stray doughnut. Kipper knows that he did not do it and Tiger also did not do it, but someone else did.
61	"Skates"	Tiger, Pig, Arnold	George Tarry	16 March 2000
Tiger and Kipper go to the park to try out Tiger's new rollerblades. Tiger crashes and hurts one of his thumbs. He tells Pig he is so badly injured that he cannot use rollerblades any more, and Pig can borrow them. But Pig is quite happy with Kipper's roller skates and does a ballet dance to show them.
62	"Cousins"	Mouse, Mouse's Cousins	George Tarry	23 March 2000
Mouse's two cousins come to stay in Kipper's house. At first, it seems like a good idea, although Kipper is confused as to which mouse is which. But the two cousins are always hungry, and they make a lot of noise. Eventually though, Kipper sends them out, leaving just him and Mouse.
63	"The Flying Machine"	Tiger, Pig, Arnold, Jake	Neil Arksey	30 March 2000
Kipper decides to make something out of old bits and pieces he finds lying around. He thinks he is making "a flying machine", but it turns out to be something much more useful for such a hot Summer's day.
64	"Arnold's Drum"	Tiger, Pig, Arnold	James Mason	6 April 2000
Arnold gets a new drum. He plays the drum non-stop at Kipper's, Tiger's, and Pig's picnic, throwing the big day into chaos.
65	"The Key"	Mouse	James Mason	13 April 2000
Kipper finds an old key, and remembers that it is for a clockwork mouse in his cardboard toybox. His friend, Mouse is unimpressed, all because it is not like a real mouse. Kipper decides that the two mice should have a race, which they do, but when the clockwork mouse wins the race, Mouse has had enough. She decides to hide the key.

=== Series 6 (2000) ===
No.	Title	Character(s) Appearing	Written by	Original airdate (UK)
66	"The Holiday"	Tiger, Sea Lion	Dave Ingham	28 September 2000
At the beach, Tiger just wants to read his book, called "The Purple Dragon Who Sneezed". Kipper keeps interrupting Tiger, so Tiger tells him to go for a swim in the nearby water. Kipper plays ball with a noisy sea lion, but Tiger does not believe him. He eventually finishes his book, and then Kipper starts reading the book, wanting to be left alone. Tiger eventually meets the sea lion head-on, and soon, all three of them play happily together in the sea with the beach ball, reading book forgotten.
67	"The Big Race"	Tiger, Pig, Arnold, Jake	Dave Ingham	5 October 2000
Kipper, Tiger, and Pig decide to race. The only prize is one of Pig's chocolate cakes. Tiger goes on his tricycle and ends up in the duck pond, but Kipper keeps running. Arnold gets a lift with Jake on his scooter.
68	"Arnold on Wheels"	Tiger, Pig, Arnold, The Ducks	Neil Arksey	12 October 2000
Pig leaves Arnold with Kipper, and wobbles off on his bicycle. Kipper lends Arnold his first bike and, with the help of some stabilizers, they have a wonderful ride around Big Hill. Pig cannot believe it is Arnold hurtling towards him on his return, a better bike rider than Pig will ever be.
69	"Pig's Sweater"	Tiger, Pig, Arnold	Dave Ingham	19 October 2000
Pig is very proud of his new blue woolly sweater and shows it off to Kipper. Arnold spots a big red arrow, and then another, and they follow them into the woods. Pig does not notice that he has caught his sweater on a branch. The red arrows were only Tiger's idea, and he laughs at them from a tree he is hiding in. Then he realises that they are lost. The unraveled wool from Pig's sweater leads them back home.
70	"Buried Treasure"	Tiger, Jake, Squirrel, The Ducks	George Tarry	26 October 2000
Jake has lost something in the park. It is a surprise, so he cannot tell Kipper and Tiger exactly what it is. They find an ancient treasure map signed by "Blackbeard the pirate" and follow the clues. When they all meet up again at the park bench just near the duck pond, Kipper and Tiger realise that Jake just lost the map. The treasure hunt itself was to be a surprise for Kipper's birthday, but Jake has even got the date wrong.
71	"Clay Time"	Tiger, Pig, Arnold	Dave Ingham	2 November 2000
One fine day, Kipper finds Tiger messily trying to make a clay pot on his new potter's wheel. They decide to make some clay pots together and Tiger tells Kipper how difficult it is. Pig gives his young cousin, Arnold, a ride on the potter's wheel, thinking it is "a car without wheels". They find the clay pots Tiger and Kipper made, and think that they are both chocolate cookies. Pig has some explaining to do.
72	"The Purple Park Monster"	Tiger, Pig, Arnold	George Tarry	9 November 2000
Tiger and Kipper decide to hunt for the purple park monster, but when they both lay a trap for it, they get more than they bargained for.
73	"The River Trip"	Tiger, Jake	James Mason	16 November 2000
Kipper, Tiger, and Jake take a boat trip on the river.
74	"The Robot"	Pig, Arnold, The Ducks	Dave Ingham	23 November 2000
Kipper is waiting for Pig and Arnold at the duck pond when a small friendly robot clanks out of the water in the pond. At Kipper's house, the Robot tries a piece of bread, a milkshake, and even some chocolate cookies, but when Kipper introduces squeaky Hippo, to his horror, the robot eats him too. Happily, Kipper and Hippo are eventually reunited at the duck pond, and all is well.
75	"The Missing Tape Mystery"	Tiger, Pig, Arnold, Jake	George Tarry	30 November 2000
It is Arnold's birthday, and he has got some great gifts. Pig has given him a "cassette player", but the tape is missing. They all want to play musical chairs, but they cannot play without music. Everyone thinks everyone else has the missing tape until Tiger asks some searching questions. Eventually, when Tiger discovers the missing tape hiding in his hat, the game can finally happen and Arnold's birthday party can go on with no problems.
76	"Kipper the Hero"	Tiger, Pig, Arnold, Jake, Kitten	Dave Ingham	7 December 2000
Kipper thinks the Wonder Dog books are great and decides to be Kipper the Super Dog. Kipper is a real hero, however, when Jake's kitten falls into a stream and he rescues him using only his blanket. Note: This is the last episode that Jake appeared.
77	"The Magic Carpet"	The Bleepers	James Mason	14 December 2000
A magic carpet, complete with three wishes, turns up in Kipper's house. He wishes himself and Hippo to the Moon to meet the Bleepers. The carpet tips Hippo off when they reach the Moon, and the Bleepers find him and wonder what he is and how he got there. When Kipper turns up the Bleepers wonder how he got there. He tells them about the carpet itself, but they just laugh. He gives them "a ride right round the Moon" and at last, they both believe him.
78	"The Farm"	Tiger, Pig, Arnold, The Ducks, The Farm Animals	Dave Ingham	21 December 2000
Kipper, Tiger (wearing his "proper farmer's boots"), Pig, and Arnold are off to the farm. Arnold finds a large white egg and makes a nest for it in his buggy. The others tease him, but soon the egg hatches and a duckling appears. It joins its mother duck and six brothers and sisters and soon Kipper with Arnold on his shoulders, Tiger slipping in the mud as he carries the buggy, and finally Pig, joins the end of the fluffy procession.
