= Lodge Farm Park =

Park in the London Borough of Havering, England

Coordinates: 51.582°N 0.192°E

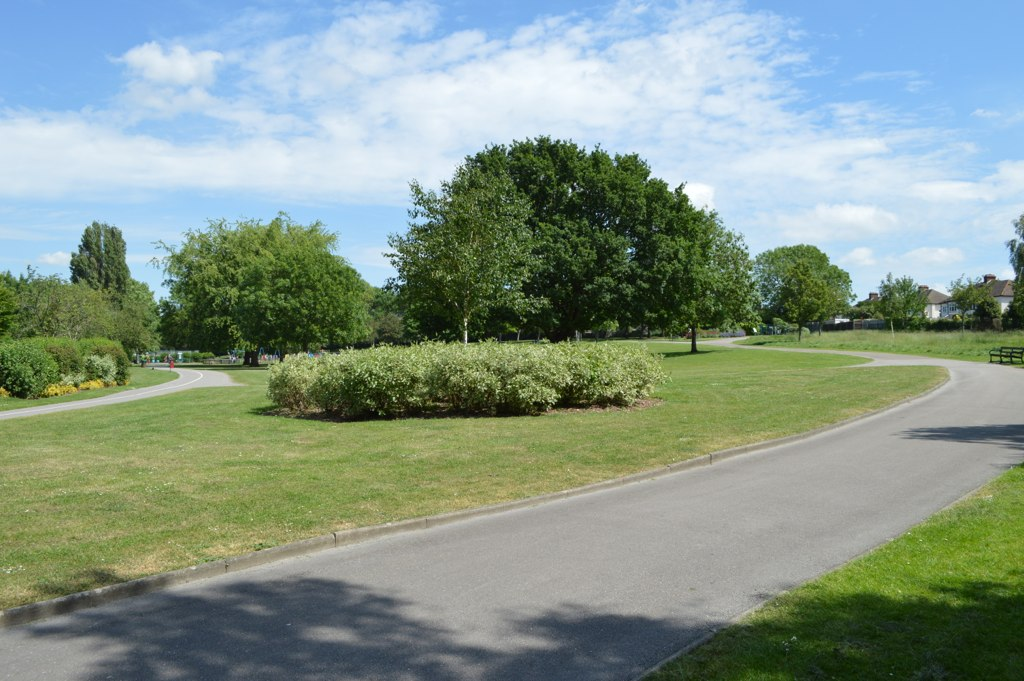
- Interactive map of Lodge Farm Park

Lodge Farm Park is a public park in Gidea Park in the London Borough of Havering, United Kingdom.

It is one of a series of parks which stretch northwards from the railway line between Romford and Gidea Park. The southern entrance to Lodge Farm Park is in Carlton Road (which runs parallel to the railway line) and the northern entrance is on Main Road (formerly called Hare Street) opposite to Raphael Park.

The park is home to Romford Bowls Club. There was a temporary miniature railway (7 1/4" gauge) provided by Havering Miniature Railway Club in 2015 and a proposal has been submitted to Havering council for a permanent railway.

As of early 2017 the construction of the railway has seen a new station called Black's Brook created in the picnic area. The railings surrounding the platform were donated by Costains and are reclaimed from Shenfield Station.
