= Raphael Park =

Public park in England

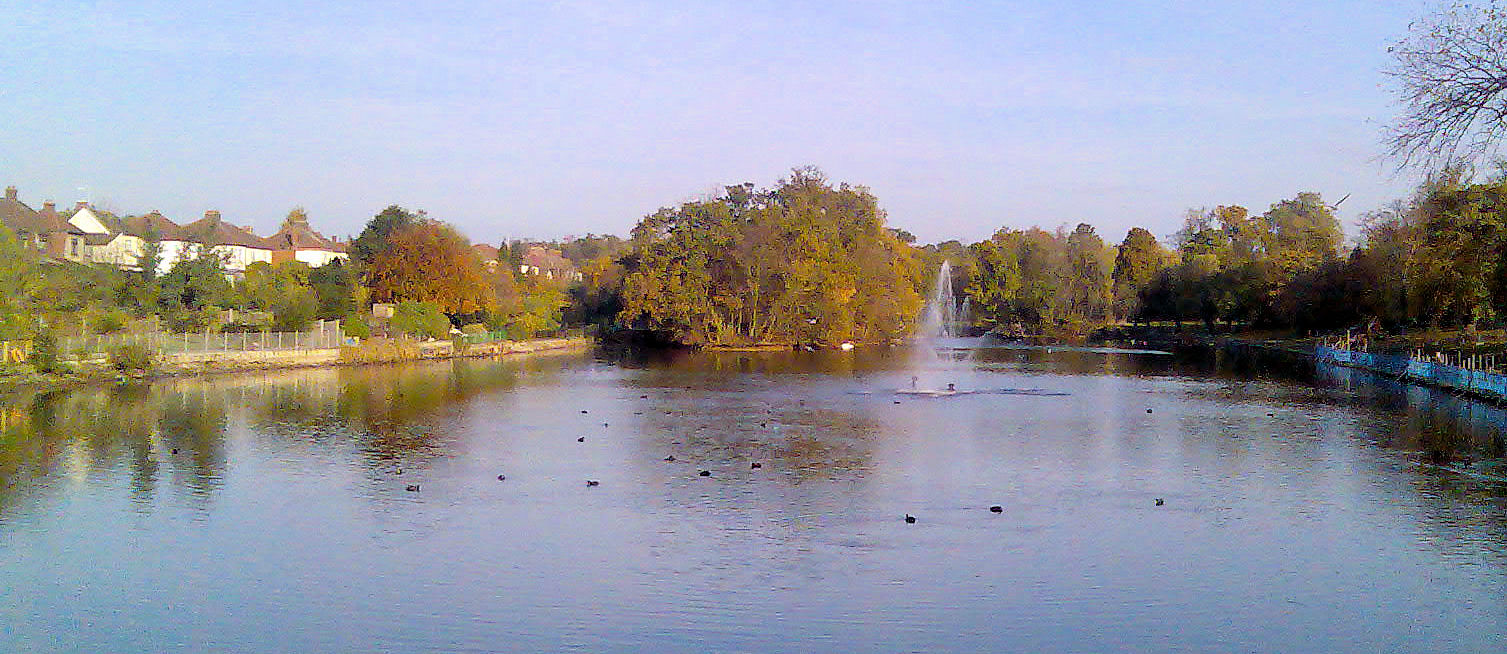
- Raphael Park's lake pictured from Main Road, 2008
- Type: Urban park
- Location: Gidea Park, Romford, London, United Kingdom
- Coordinates: 51.589°N 0.190°E

Raphael Park (pronounced "Ray-full") is a public park in Gidea Park, Romford, in the London Borough of Havering, United Kingdom. It is one of a series of parks stretching northwards from the railway line between Romford and Gidea Park.

The southern entrance to Raphael Park is on Main Road, formerly called Hare Street, and the northern entrance is just south of the A12 Eastern Avenue. The western boundary of the park follows the line of Black's Brook, a small stream that was dammed where the park meets Main Road to form a lake 12–20 ft deep and called Black's Canal, this being done before the park was created. The dam itself is just inside the park next to the 18th century bridge which carries Main Road and known as Black's Bridge.

The park itself is part of the parkland that once surrounded Gidea Hall. Raphael Park contains two ancient Pedunculate Oaks recorded by the Woodland Trust. The park is named after Sir Herbert Raphael MP, who gave it to Romford Urban District in 1904.

In addition to the lake, which is used for angling, there are several amenities provided within the park. In the southern part of the park is a bandstand, and then near the end of the lake is a rockery which is used by the Romford Summer Theatre. Beyond this point the park widens to the east, and there are sports pitches (football in winter and cricket in summer) and sunken tennis courts, the sunken nature of which is reputed to be the result of sand having been dug there for use in construction of the surrounding houses. To the north of the tennis courts is a children's play area which was remodelled in 2009, the circular play area plus tennis courts having previously been filled with water and known as the "Spoon Pond". Apart from these the park consists of parkland, mature woodland and grassland.

The park also contains a statue of the children's character Percy the Park Keeper, created by author and illustrator Nick Butterworth, the inspiration for whom was said to have come from a real life park-keeper in Raphael Park.

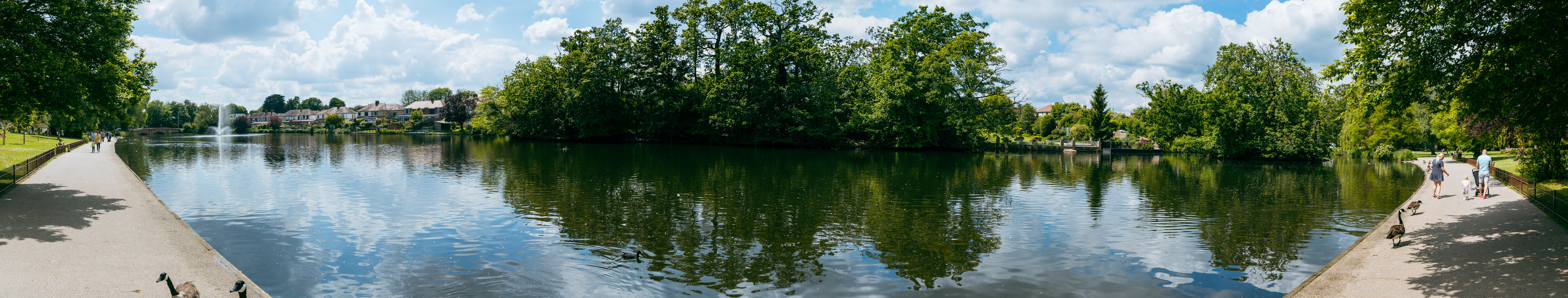
Panorama from Raphael Park
