= Mick Inkpen =

British author and illustrator

- Born: 22 December 1952 (age 73); Romford, Essex, England
- Education: Royal Liberty School
- Occupation: Author
- Writing career
- Language: English
- Genre: Children's Fiction
- Subject: Picture Storybooks
- Notable work: Kipper the Dog
- Notable awards: British Book Award, Children's Book Award, Play and Learn Award, etc.

Mick Inkpen (born 22 December 1952) is a British author and illustrator. He is best known for his creations Kipper the Dog and Wibbly Pig.

== Background ==
Inkpen was born on 22 December 1952 in Romford, Essex, England. He was educated at Royal Liberty School in Gidea Park. He is a friend of Nick Butterworth, who also grew up in Romford, and they collaborated on the 1990 book Wonderful Earth.

== Awards ==
Inkpen has won numerous awards worldwide including The British Book Award for Lullabyhullabaloo and Penguin Small, The Children's Book Award for Threadbear, The Parents and Munch Bunch Play and Learn Award and The Right Start Petit Filous Best Toy Award for Where, Oh Where is Kipper's Bear?. He received the Children's Book Award for the 1991 work Threadbear. Kipper won the Children's BAFTA for Best Animated Film in 1998, and Kipper's A to Z won the silver medal in the 2001 Smarties Prize.

== Selected works ==
- What For (1975)

=== Television series ===
- Kipper (1997–2000)
- Wibbly Pig (2009–2010)
- Furry Tales (TBA) – a collection of Fairy tales using anthropomorphic animals (instead of humans)
