= Romford Hockey Club =

Hockey club in London

Romford Hockey Club (RHC) is a hockey club located in Gidea Park, Romford, in the London Borough of Havering. It was founded in 1920.

The RHC currently has three men's teams competing in the East leagues, two women's teams competing in the Essex Hockey leagues, and a youth section.
