= St Michael and All Angels Church, Gidea Park =

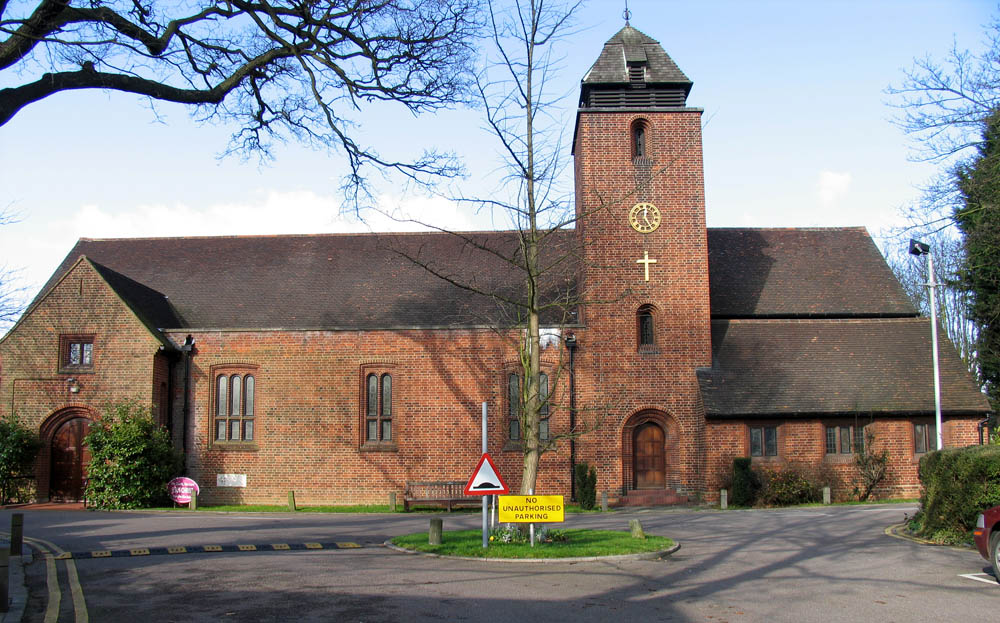
- St Michael and All Angels Church, Gidea Park
- 51°35′14.316″N 0°12′5.9148″E
- Country: England
- Denomination: Church of England
- Website: http://stmichaelsgideapark.org.uk

History
- Dedicated: 21 May 1938

Architecture
- Architect(s): Crowe and Careless
- Years built: 1931-1938
- Completed: 1938

St Michael and All Angels Church is a Church of England parish church in the Gidea Park area of Romford, east London. The area had become a garden suburb in the 1910s and a church dedicated to St Michael was built there in 1928, as a mission church of the parish church of All Saints Squirrels Heath (now Ardleigh Green). Gidea Park was formed as an ecclesiastical district of its own in 1931 and a parish church commissioned from the architects Crowe and Careless. It was completed and consecrated on 21 May 1938, with the ecclesiastical district upgraded to a parish and the mission church building converted into the Bishop Chadwick Hall.
