= Nick Butterworth =

British children's author and illustrator (born 1946)

- Born: 24 May 1946 (age 80); Kingsbury, London, England
- Education: Royal Liberty School
- Occupations: Author, illustrator
- Children: 2
- Writing career
- Genre: Children's fiction
- Subject: Picture storybooks
- Notable work: Percy the Park Keeper
- Notable awards: Nestlé Smarties Book Prize; 2005
- Website: snapper-films.com

Nick Butterworth (born 24 May 1946) is a British author and illustrator of children's books. His picture book The Whisperer won the Nestlé Smarties Book Prize in 2005.

His Percy the Park Keeper books became an animated television series of the same name starring Jim Broadbent. His Q Pootle 5 books were adapted by the BBC and broadcast on CBeebies, the channel for young children, in 2013.

In the 1980s, he was a presenter on ITV children's programme Rub-a-Dub-Tub.

== Early life ==
Born on 24 May 1946 in Kingsbury in North London, from the age of 2, Butterworth grew up in a sweet shop in Romford. After his education at the Royal Liberty School in Gidea Park, Butterworth left home to work as an apprentice typographical designer with the National Children's Home before working at Crosby Fletcher Forbes (the forerunner of design agency Pentagram).

== Career ==
Butterworth became a freelance graphic designer in the late 1960s. This led to a partnership with long-standing friend and children's writer and illustrator Mick Inkpen. Their published collaborations include Just Like Jasper, Jasper's Beanstalk, The Sports Day, The Nativity Play, and Wonderful Earth.

In 1983 and 1984, in the early days of breakfast television in the UK, he appeared as a regular presenter on Good Morning Britain, illustrating and telling stories on air in a children's segment called Rub-a-Dub-Tub.

His works as sole author-illustrator include several books featuring the character Percy the Park Keeper, the first of which, One Snowy Night, was published in 1989. Believed to have been inspired by a park warden who worked at Raphael Park in Romford, a statue of the character was installed in the same park in 2013. The books were re-released in 2019 for the 30th anniversary of publication. The Percy book After the Storm has been adapted for the theatre. Percy also appeared in his own animated television series in the late 1990s, Percy the Park Keeper, with Jim Broadbent voicing the eponymous character. According to publisher HarperCollins in 2019, global sales of the books reached nine million copies.

Butterworth has written and illustrated a number of other children's books, including Thud! (1997) and Albert le Blanc (2002), which was shortlisted for the Kate Greenaway Medal in 2002.

The Whisperer, published in 2004, is written from the perspective of a voyeuristic rat in mean city streets and is darker than many of Butterworth's books. Described as a feline West Side Story, it won the Nestle Smarties Prize in 2005. It is dedicated to Desmond Tutu.

His Q Pootle 5 books are written for young children and feature a space-dweller whose friends include Oopsy, Planet Dave and Tiger. Butterworth is a founding partner, with his son Ben, of Snapper Productions, producers of the CBeebies animated series Q Pootle 5. He is the executive producer of the series.

== Personal life ==
Butterworth lives in Essex with his wife Annette. They have been married since 1975 and have two adult children.
