= Kipper (TV series) =

Animated children's television series

- Title card
- Genre: Children's television show Animated series Education; Comedy
- Created by: Mick Inkpen
- Based on: Kipper the Dog by Mick Inkpen
- Directed by: Mike Stuart
- Voices of: Martin Clunes; Chris Lang; Julia Sawalha
- Music by: Bob Heatlie
- Opening theme: "They Call Him Kipper" performed by Bob Heatlie
- Ending theme: "They Call Him Kipper" (instrumental)
- Country of origin: United Kingdom
- Original language: English
- No. of series: 6
- No. of episodes: 78 (list of episodes)

Production
- Producer: Ginger Gibbons
- Running time: 10 minutes
- Production companies: Grand Slamm Children's Films; HIT Entertainment

Original release
- Network: ITV (Children's ITV); Nick Jr. (United States)
- Release: 5 September 1997 – 21 December 2000

Kipper is a British preschool animated children's television series based on the characters from Mick Inkpen's Kipper the Dog picture book series. Seventy-eight episodes were produced. The episodes have received critical acclaim and have won awards including a BAFTA award for best children's animation. The show was produced by HIT Entertainment with animation production by Grand Slamm Children's Films, and ran for six seasons on ITV from September 1997 until December 2000. Out of these, thirteen episodes - twelve of the first series, and the last of the third series, were written by Mick Inkpen himself.

== Premise ==
The series follows Kipper the Dog as he embarks on various adventures to an assortment of destinations throughout the English countryside. He is joined by friends, Tiger, Pig, Arnold, and Jake.

=== Characters ===
- Kipper (voiced by Martin Clunes) is a fun-loving, caring and warm-hearted dog with a soft voice who is the titular character of the series. He embodies the true essence of what it means to carpe diem. He is also very selfless, even though he hoards lots of small belongings like books and toys. Kipper is a Jack Russell Terrier who has many exciting encounters with his friends.
- Tiger (voiced by Chris Lang) is Kipper's best friend. He is more realistic, practical, and wise than Kipper with a tendency to think long-term. Sometimes Tiger can be very smug and haughty, even though he really is a kind dog at heart. Tiger is a Scottish Terrier.
- Pig (voiced by Chris Lang) is Kipper's second best friend. Pig is very outgoing, but loves normality and gets easily irritated by anything strange or mysterious. He likes to eat chocolate cake and biscuits.
- Arnold (voiced by Chris Lang) is Pig's live-in toddler cousin and Kipper's third best friend. Even though Arnold almost never talks, he is actually more curious, observant, and intelligent than Pig. He can still say easy words like "duck" and "igloo".
- Jake (voiced by Chris Lang) is a friendly Old English Sheepdog who is Kipper's fourth best friend. He is a minor character in the first series who makes more regular appearances after joining the main characters in the second series where he, Kipper, and Tiger have had many adventures together.
- The Magic Frog (voiced by Chris Lang) is a magical frog who Kipper met and encountered once.
- The Bleeper People (voiced by Chris Lang) are two space aliens who live on the moon.
- Mouse (voiced by Julia Sawalha, credited as Julie Sawalha in later appearances) is a young mouse girl who lives with Kipper at his house. She is the only female character who appears in the series.

== Episodes ==
Series	Episodes	Originally released	
Series	Episodes	First released	Last released
1	13	5 September 1997	28 November 1997
2	13	24 September 1998	17 December 1998
3	13	21 January 1999	15 April 1999
4	13	23 September 1999	16 December 1999
5	13	20 January 2000	13 April 2000
6	13	28 September 2000	21 December 2000

== Broadcast ==
The series aired on Children's ITV (later CITV) in the United Kingdom. In the United States, it aired on Nick Jr. and PBS Kids Sprout. It also aired in Canada on YTV, in Australia on ABC TV and in Europe on JimJam.

== Home media ==
=== UK releases ===
In the United Kingdom, HIT Video and HIT Entertainment PLC both released various VHS tapes and DVD releases of the television series.

Release name	Format	Release year	Episodes
The Visitor and Other Stories	VHS	1998	The Visitor; The Umbrella; The Seaside; Nothing Ever Happens; The Rainbow Puddle
Pig's Present and Other Stories	VHS	1998	Pig's Present; The Conker Tree; The Bleepers; Pig's Cousin; Tiger's Torch
The Little Ghost and Other Stories	VHS	1998	The Little Ghost; The Goldfish; Sleepless Night; The Camping Trip; The Conker Tree
Snowy Day and Other Stories	VHS	1999	Snowy Day; Hiccups; Space Invaders; Kipper Is Unwell; The Igloo
Kipper's Circus and Other Stories	VHS	1999	Kipper's Circus; The Nest; The Butterfly; The Gismo; The Lost Mug
The Treasure Hunt and Other Stories	VHS	1999	The Treasure Hunt; The Paddling Pool; The Magnifying Glass; The Rescue; The Picnic
Christmas Eve and Other Stories	VHS	1999	Christmas Eve; The Dinosaur; Tiger's Sledge; The Magic Act; The Magic Lamp; Arnold's Balloon Trip
Looking after Arnold and Other Stories	VHS	2000	Looking After Arnold; The Swimming Pool; Cakes and Tails; The Long Walk; The Surprise Party; The Ball
The Big Freeze and Other Stories	VHS	2000	Echo Echo; The Big Freeze; Jake's Friend; The Fair; Big Owl's Bath; Jake's Bird
Crazy Golf and Other Stories	VHS	2000	Pirates; Tiger's Cold; The Mouse; Clouds; Crazy Golf
Hide and Seek and Other Stories	VHS	2001	Tiger's Rocket; Water Water Everywhere; Pig's Shop; Hide and Seek; The Jumble Sale
The Flying Machine and Other Stories	VHS	2001	The Flying Machine; Arnold's Drum; Skates; The Key; Cousins
The Robot and Other Stories	VHS	2001	The Holiday; The Big Race; Arnold on Wheels; Pig's Sweater; The Robot
The Magic Carpet and Other Stories	VHS	2002	The Magic Carpet; Tiger's Joke Box; Buried Treasure; Clay Time; The Missing Tape Mystery
Classic Collection	VHS/DVD	2004	The Visitor; The Umbrella; The Seaside; Nothing Ever Happens; Pig's Present; The Rainbow Puddle; The Butterfly; The Bleepers; Snowy Day; Pig's Cousin
Treasured Tales	DVD	2009	The Paddling Pool; The Magnifying Glass; The Rescue; The Picnic; The Treasure Hunt

=== US releases ===
In the United States, VHS tapes of the show were originally released by Hallmark Home Entertainment through Family Home Entertainment, Artisan Entertainment, and briefly Lyrick Studios, and later on, VHS tapes and DVDs were released by HIT themselves.

Video name	Format	Release date	Episodes
The Visitor and Other Stories	VHS	July 14, 1999	The Visitor; The Umbrella; The Seaside; Nothing Ever Happens
Pig's Present and Other Stories	VHS	February 1, 2000	Pig's Present; The Rainbow Puddle; The Butterfly; The Bleepers
Snowy Day and Other Stories	VHS	August 15, 2000	Snowy Day; Pig's Cousin; The Paddling Pool; Tiger's Torch
Pools, Parks and Picnics	VHS/DVD	June 5, 2001	The Long Walk; The Swimming Pool; The Picnic; Cakes and Tails; The Gismo; The Lost Mug; The Magnifying Glass
Tiger Tales	VHS/DVD	June 5, 2001	The Camping Trip; Tiger's Rocket; Skates; Arnold's Drum; The Holiday; Buried Treasure; The River Trip
Playtime in the Park (Blockbuster Exclusive)	VHS	June 5, 2001	The Long Walk; The Swimming Pool; The Picnic; Cakes and Tails; The Gismo; The Lost Mug; The Magnifying Glass; The Camping Trip; Tiger's Rocket; Skates; Arnold's Drum; The Holiday; Buried Treasure; The River Trip
Imagine That	VHS/DVD	January 15, 2002	Kipper's Circus; Pirates; The Magic Act; The Magic Lamp; The Costume Party; Arnold's Balloon Trip; The Fair
Cuddly Critters	VHS/DVD	March 5, 2002	The Nest; Jake's Bird; Echo Echo; The Goldfish; The Mouse; Hide and Seek; Hedgehog Watch
Amazing Discoveries	VHS/DVD	June 4, 2002	The Purple Park Monster; The Robot; The Dinosaur; Jake's Friend; The Ball; The Flying Machine; Space Invaders
Let It Snow	VHS/DVD	October 22, 2002	Christmas Eve; The Igloo; Tiger's Sled; The Big Freeze; Snowy Day
Playtime	VHS/DVD	January 28, 2003	The Treasure Hunt; Looking After Arnold; Tiger's Joke Box; Pig's Sweater; Clay Time; The Magic Carpet; Kipper the Hero
Fun in the Sun	VHS/DVD	June 3, 2003	The Rescue; Clouds; Crazy Golf; Water Water Everywhere; The Big Race; Arnold on Wheels; The Farm
Friendship Tails	VHS/DVD	January 27, 2004	Sleepless Night; Hiccups; Kipper is Unwell; Tiger's Cold; The Conker Tree; The Jumble Sale
Water Play	VHS/DVD	March 23, 2004	The Umbrella; The Seaside; The Rainbow Puddle; The Paddling Pool; Big Owl's Bath
Kipper Helps Out	VHS/DVD	August 10, 2004	The Visitor; Pig's Present; The Butterfly; The Bleepers; Pig's Cousin; The Little Ghost
Puppy Love	VHS/DVD	January 25, 2005	Nothing Ever Happens; Tiger's Torch; Pig's Shop; Cousins; The Key; The Missing Tape Mystery

=== Digital download releases ===
This list is for videos that were never released on physical media and are only available on digital download in the US. There are currently only two. One is called "Tales of Adventure" featuring episodes already on other releases. The other is an alternate version of "The Visitor & Other Stories" in which the episodes are in reverse order as to how they are on the US VHS release.

Release name	Release year	Episodes
Tales of Adventure	2013	The Goldfish; The Gismo; The Nest; The Seaside; The Big Freeze; The Swimming Pool
The Visitor & Other Stories	2013	Nothing Ever Happens; The Seaside; The Umbrella; The Visitor

== Reception ==
Common Sense Media gives Kipper four out of five stars, and it says the show's characters are positive role models, except Tiger, "but he always learns his lessons"; all the characters "do lots of exploring and learn lessons about friendship, kindness, and the difference between right and wrong". A list published by the Thomas B. Fordham Institute names Kipper as the top television show for two- and three-year-old children because of its focus on "developing social and emotional intelligence" through interactions among its characters. HIT Entertainment chairman Peter Orton regarded the show as a potential new Snoopy as it gained popularity.
