= Q Pootle 5 =

British children's television series

- Genre: Children's; Animated; Science fiction
- Created by: Nick Butterworth; Ben Butterworth
- Written by: Nick Butterworth; Ben Butterworth; Lee Pressman; Dave Ingham; Darren Jones; Laura Beaumont; Paul Larson
- Directed by: Adam Shaw
- Voices of: Ed Gaughan; Joanna Page; Steve Kynman; Richard Ridings; Ella Kenion
- Composer: David Schweitzer
- Country of origin: United Kingdom
- No. of seasons: 1
- No. of episodes: 52

Production
- Executive producers: Nick Butterworth; Annette Butterworth
- Producers: Ben Butterworth; Margo Marchant
- Editor: Judith Allen
- Running time: 11 min
- Production companies: Snapper Productions; Blue Zoo

Original release
- Network: CBeebies

Q Pootle 5 is a 2013 animated television series based on the books Q Pootle 5 and Q Pootle 5 in Space by author Nick Butterworth. It revolves around the title character Q Pootle 5 and his friends, and is set on and around the fictional planet Oki Doki.

== Characters ==
=== Main characters ===
- Q Pootle 5 (voiced by Ed Gaughan), known as "Pootle" to his friends, is a friendly green alien and the lead character in the show. He enjoys stargazing on top of the camper van where he lives and spending time with his friends.
- Oopsy (voiced by Joanna Page) is Pootle's best friend. She is pink and has a lot of hair that sticks straight up. Oopsy lives in an upside-down rocket, and enjoys drawing and spending time with Pootle.
- Eddi (voiced by Steve Kynman) is a conjoined twin purple alien. He talks to himself a lot, and is less confident than the other characters. Eddi enjoys tinkering with his rocket, and adding to his string collection.
- Stella (voiced by Ella Kenion) is a yellow alien and wears pink Wellington boots. She lives in a treehouse and loves gardening most of all, but she also likes to play her bagpipes whenever there's an opportunity to do so.
- Ray (voiced by Steve Kynman) is a blue major bird. He lives with Stella, and can sometimes be a bit grumpy. He has a fear of heights, and an intense dislike of Stella's bagpipes.
- Groobie (voiced by Richard Ridings) is the oldest alien. He is orange with thick purple eyebrows, and can be a bit forgetful. He lives in a shack in front of a junk yard full of scrap items which he occasionally restores. Everyone likes to gather at Groobie's because he makes the best smoothies in the galaxy.
- Bud-D (voiced by Steve Kynman) is Groobie's robot. He is enthusiastic and well-intentioned, but often malfunctions.
- Planet Dave (voiced by Richard Ridings) lives within view of Oki Doki. He is big enough for everyone to land their ships on when they visit him, and is very old indeed.

=== Additional characters ===
- Roy is a turquoise major bird, seen in the episode "A Friend For Ray".
- Maurice is a caterpillar who Stella finds on a plant that Pootle has given her in the episode "Maurice".
- Planet Roger is not seen in series one, but in the episode "Groobie to the Rescue", Groobie reads out a letter sent to Planet Dave from Planet Roger.
- Comet Gordon visits Planet Dave once every 3 million years.

== Episodes ==
There are 52 episodes of the Q Pootle 5 series. Each episode has a running time of approximately 11 minutes. Additionally, there is one 26-minute long Christmas special episode called "Pootle All The Way".

No. in series	Title	Directed by	Written by	Original air date
1	The Great Space Race	Gary Adams, Adam Shaw	Dave Ingham	29 July 2013
2	The Evenfruit Picnic	Gary Adams, Adam Shaw	Nick Butterworth, Dave Ingham	30 July 2013
3	Groobie Woogie on Planet Dave	Arnfinn Moseng	Nick Butterworth, Dave Ingham	31 July 2013
4	Pootle's house Guest	Dan Chambers	Nick Butterworth, Dave Ingham	1 August 2013
5	The Picture Puzzle	Gary Andrews	Nick Butterworth, Dave Ingham	2 August 2013
6	Officer Bud-D	Arnfinn Moseng	Nick Butterworth, Dave Ingham	5 August 2013
7	Where's Ray?	Dan Chambers, Adam Shaw	Lee Pressman	6 August 2013
8	Eddi's Hat	Gary Andrews, Adam Shaw	Ben Butterworth	7 August 2013
9	Oopsy's New Do	Dan Chambers	Ben Butterworth	8 August 2013
10	Sports Day	Arnfinn Moseng	Ben Butterworth	9 August 2013
11	Groobie to the Rescue	Gary Andrews	Nick Butterworth	12 August 2013
12	Rocket bird Oopsy	Arnfinn Moseng	Nick Butterworth	13 August 2013
13	A Day With Ray	Dan Chambers	Lisa Akhurst	14 August 2013
14	Map Muddle	Gary Andrews		15 August 2013
15	Two Places At Once	Arnfinn Moseng	Darren Jones	16 August 2013
16	Asteroid Alert	Dan Chambers		23 September 2013
17	Phew! What a Scorcher	Gary Andrews		24 September 2018
18	Hitting The High Note	Dan Chambers		25 September 2013
19	The Biggest Picture Ever	Arnfinn Moseng		26 September 2013
20	Oopsy's Backwards Day	Gary Andrews		27 September 2013
21	The Flying Display	Arnfinn Moseng		30 September 2013
22	Oopsy's Megaphone	Dan Chambers		1 October 2013
23	Pootle the Explorer	Gary Andrews	Laura Beaumont, Paul Larson	2 October 2013
24	Rocking not Rolling	Arnfinn Moseng	Darren Jones	3 October 2013
25	The Visitor From Space	Dan Chambers	Justin Trefgarne	4 October 2013
26	Groobie's Space Wash	Gary Andrews		7 October 2013
27	The Singing Valley	Gary Andrews		8 October 2013
28	Flower Power	Gary Andrews		10 October 2013
29	A Friend for Ray			
30	The Foggy Day			
31	The Eight-Eyed Thingy from Galaxy 7			
32	Groobie's Mighty Magnet			
33	Spaceship Hiccup			
34	Strange Sounds In The Night			
35	Birthday Mix Up		Darren Jones	
36	Pootle's New Spaceship			
37	The Cosmic Whipple			
38	Beat Box Bud-D			
39	Boing Boing Boing			
40	Pootle Phone Home			
41	Maurice			
42	Planet Dave in a Spin			
43	Bet-E			
44	Runaway Rocket			
45	Groobie's Day Out		Darren Jones	
46	Oopsy's Fairy Tale			
47	It Came From Outer Space			
48	The Bubble Craters			
49	Bud-D Gets a Rocket			
50	Waiting for Gordo			
51	Rocket Remote		Darren Jones	
52	A Very Special Place			

== Development ==
Author and executive producer Nick Butterworth chose Q Pootle 5 from amongst his other children's books as the character to develop into an animated series because, as an alien, he would not be culturally tied to any one location. He developed the series with his son Ben, who suggested they form their own production company. Together with Nick's wife Annette they added additional characters and locations to those already seen in the books, before producing a pilot clip with animation studio Blue Zoo from which a series was commissioned.

Music is an important element of Q Pootle 5. Producer Ben Butterworth said: "When we started to consider the music for the programme we didn't want music to be just an accompaniment to the story, we wanted people's experience to be enhanced by the music. The score had to be integral to the storytelling – creating atmosphere, adding nuance and subtlety, underpinning the emotional content of a story, driving the action of a scene, or making us laugh".
