= Percy the Park Keeper =

- Genre: Comedy; Children's television series
- Created by: Nick Butterworth
- Voices of: Jim Broadbent; Enn Reitel; David Holt; Kate Harbour; Chris Lang
- Narrated by: Richard Briers; Jim Broadbent (only in the audiobooks)
- Country of origin: United Kingdom
- Original language: English
- No. of episodes: 13 (4 seasonal specials)

Production
- Running time: 10 minutes (full episodes); 30 minutes (seasonal specials)
- Production companies: Grand Slamm Children's Films; HIT Entertainment

Original release
- Network: ITV (CITV)
- Release: 25 December 1996 – 12 December 1999

Percy the Park Keeper is a British animated children's television series based on the popular books by British author Nick Butterworth. The series is produced by HIT Entertainment with animation production by Grand Slamm Children's Films. The series initially ran as a series of four half-four specials that aired on CITV between December 1996 and December 1997 which were followed by a single series of thirteen ten-minute episodes that aired between September and December 1999.

== Characters and voice cast ==
- Percy the Park Keeper – (voiced by Jim Broadbent) – The show's title character who regularly maintains the park, and is still always able to find the time to have fun with the animals.
- Fox – (voiced by David Holt) – A fun-loving sort who tends to make others laugh and can still be quite sensitive.
- Badger – (voiced by Enn Reitel and later by Chris Lang) – A wise and sensible sort who often tries to organize games in the park to keep the other animals happy.
- Rabbits – (male rabbits voiced by David Holt and the female rabbit voiced by Kate Harbour) – An excitable sort who easily gets timid at anything remotely scary.
- Squirrels – (Mr Squirrel is voiced by Enn Reitel and later by David Holt and Mrs Squirrel is voiced by Kate Harbour) – An irritable sort who often buries nuts and acorns and cannot always remember where they put them in the first place.
- Hedgehog – (voiced by David Holt) – A quiet sort who finds his sharp spines problematic.
- The Mice – (the male mice are voiced by David Holt and the female mice are voiced by Kate Harbour) – Playful sorts who are always happy to join in various challenges in the park.
- The Ducks – (Mr Duck voiced by David Holt and Mrs Duck voiced by Kate Harbour) – Quarrelsome sorts who normally play at the duck pond and migrate when Winter comes to the park.
- Owl – (voiced by Kate Harbour) – A wise sort who never hunts at night time, like an ordinary owl. She is always active during the daytime, but she forgets things very easily.
- Robin Redbreast – (voiced by David Holt) – Spends most of his time flying around the park and perching on trees.
- Mole – (voiced by Enn Reitel and later by David Holt) – He is always in a rush and has trouble finding his way under the ground of the park.
- Narrator - (voiced in the audiobooks alternately by Richard Briers and Jim Broadbent) - Tells each of the stories.

== Episodes ==
=== Seasonal specials (1996–97) ===
No.	Title	Original release date
1	"One Snowy Night"	25 December 1996
It is Winter in the park. After his hard day's work, Percy prepares for his coldest night ahead. The night is a lot colder than the park animals expected and all the snow is making it hard for them all to find shelter. That is before they all decide to spend the night in Percy's hut. Mole and Robin are the last to turn up, making the hut itself completely crowded. Note: The VHS release also includes the 15-minute special "The Animals of Percy's Park".
2	"The Secret Path"	12 March 1997
It is Spring in the park. Percy has a very big job to do by pruning a hedgerow maze. Mr Squirrel comes with him after an accident with Hedgehog. However, when all the other animals come to play with Percy in the middle of the maze, they all get stuck with the lion-shaped bench, but Hedgehog cleverly provides them the way out, along with the red wool from Percy's jumper. Note: The VHS release contains the 15-minute special "The Seasons of Percy's Park".
3	"The Rescue Party"	24 December 1997
It is Summer in the park. It is a warm, sunny day in the park and Percy is taking the day off with a picnic. Everybody else wants to come on the picnic, but before they can eat and drink anything, they all have to join in Percy's "little peace and quiet". During a leaping game, the girl rabbit falls down the park's old well. Luckily, a friendly toad who lives in the well, tells the rabbit herself how to escape and she eventually re-enters the park and re-joins Percy and the other animals. Percy and the other animals, meanwhile, gather with a long rope to help pull the girl rabbit out of the well, but, all they pull from the well is a wedged Oak tree branch, which the girl rabbit ties the rope to earlier on. Note: The VHS release contains the following 15-minute special, "The A to Z of Percy's Park".
4	"After the Storm"	26 December 1997
It is Autumn in the park. Some gusty winds and heavy rain in the night cause severe damage in the park, especially the animals' favourite oak tree, leaving them all homeless. Percy helps the animals themselves find a new home, and build a tree-house in an enormous hollow tree. Note: The VHS release also includes 15-minute special "Counting and Colours in the Park".

=== Full series (1999) ===
No.	Title	Original release date
1	"The Hedgehog's Balloon"	19 September 1999
Hedgehog is feeling upset. He loves balloons, but he can never keep them, because, as he tells Percy, they always burst the moment his sharp spines touch them. Then, Percy comes up with an ingenious plan, and with the help of some corks from his garden shed, the problem is solved, once and for all.
2	"The Fox's Hiccups"	26 September 1999
Fox gets a bad case of hiccups from drinking some lemonade while laughing at a funny joke that Mrs Squirrel tells him. After an accident, involving accidentally bumping into Percy's washing and flower pots and then becoming a ghost, his hiccups are cured for good, until he laughs out loud while drinking a glass of milk inside Percy's hut.
3	"One Warm Fox"	3 October 1999
Fox cannot sleep due to cold drafts in his den. He borrows some of Percy's woolly clothes, putting on more than he really needs, but Percy finds the extra clothes ideal for his scarecrow which the rabbits help Percy to build earlier, leaving Fox with only a pullover and solving the problem.
4	"The Rabbit Who Was Afraid of the Dark"	10 October 1999
Rabbit has become afraid of the dark, and the other animals don't know what is really causing it, but Percy does—she hasn't been eating enough carrots. She then eats some more crunchy carrots, and is then able to see properly in the dark, and is not scared of the dark itself any more.
5	"Sledge Ride"	17 October 1999
Percy is taking the day off and decides to build a real sledge. However, Fox and Mr and Mrs Squirrel borrow Percy's materials to make their own sledge. Then, they offer a Percy a ride home to the hut in it.
6	"The Hedgehog's Wings"	24 October 1999
It is a very windy Autumn day in the park, and the leaves are preparing to all fall off the trees. Hedgehog sneaks into Percy's garden shed and borrows all his tools in order to build himself some real wings in order to fly with. But, he soon discovers that flying in open air unaided is quite frightening.
7	"The Owl's Lesson"	31 October 1999
Owl discovers a bird in a nest who doesn't know how to fly, so she attempts to teach him. Then, Percy comes along and explains that the bird cannot really fly because he is only little, which Owl doesn't know.
8	"Badger's Bath"	7 November 1999
Badger spends a long time digging in the park, getting himself dirty as he does it. Percy tries to give Badger a bath, but he doesn't want one. As Percy has the bath all to himself, Badger eventually falls out of his hiding place in the tree and into the water, startling him in the process.
9	"Owl Takes Charge"	14 November 1999
When Percy catches a cold one day, Owl offers to help make a new rake to use, plant a new tree and give the park's roundabout a new coat of paint. But she isn't very good at remembering things, and she soon gets the chores all muddled up. She soon makes up for it all however when Percy is finally on his feet again and has a go on a strange-looking roundabout which Fox and Badger build earlier on.
10	"A Very Useful Little Friend"	21 November 1999
As Badger and Fox help Percy to tidy up his old tool shed, Mouse joins in the work, but her clumsiness is not helping. But when the three animal helpers eventually get locked inside the tool shed itself due to a broken door latch, Mouse proves to be very useful to them all by hooking the door handle in its rightful place, and then banging it into the hole in the shed's door with both her feet, allowing them to escape.
11	"Treasure Island"	28 November 1999
Percy uncovers a real treasure map, and he and Mrs Squirrel go out to the middle of the lake by boat to find the island that it was once buried in. They do find it eventually, but Percy then remembers that he left a fruitcake trapped in the oven, and goes back to his hut to rescue it, leaving Mrs Squirrel stranded, that is, until Mr and Mrs Duck both come to save her, along with some chestnuts that Mrs Squirrel finds in a tree earlier.
12	"The Cross Rabbit"	5 December 1999
Winter is coming to the forest, and Old Mr Rabbit wants some sleep, but the mice are all disturbing him with their wintry fun and games. Percy persuades the mice to play elsewhere in the park, but the peace itself does not last for long. That is, until Percy comes up with a very good solution—one snowball in each of Mr Rabbit's ears to help block out the noise.
13	"The Lost Acorns"	12 December 1999
Percy plants some Spring bulbs in the ground by the park's oak tree for the dark and cold months ahead. Unfortunately, Mrs Squirrel tells Percy that she has lost all her precious acorns and mistakes the planted Spring bulbs for possible acorn storages. However, when Mole finds Mrs Squirrel's secret storage by accident, Mrs Squirrel saves the day by helping Percy to replant all the bulbs, all in time for some "tea and buttered toast".

== Other Material ==
"After the Storm" got a theatre adaptation in London on Christmas 2015. The franchise eventually was commemorated with a statue of Percy in Raphael Park.

== Release ==
HIT Entertainment released "After the Storm" on VHS in September 1998.
