= Andy Day =

British actor and television presenter (born 1981)

- Born: Andrew Paul Day; May 15, 1981 (age 45); Luton, Bedfordshire, England
- Occupations: Television presenter, actor
- Known for: CBeebies (2007–present)
- Spouse: Kat Woolfe (m. 2021)
- Children: 3
- Musical career
- Genre: Children's
- Instrument: Vocals
- Member of: Andy and the Odd Socks

Andrew Paul Day (born 15 May 1981) is an English actor and television presenter. He is best known for his work on the BBC's CBeebies channel. He is also a patron of Anti-Bullying Week. He was first on CBeebies in 2007, becoming the longest-serving presenter in 2018. He is the lead singer of the band Andy and the Odd Socks.

== CBeebies ==
Day is the longest-serving CBeebies presenter having presented programmes and links since July 2007. He particularly specialises in shows about animals and nature, including:

- Andy's Top 5s
- Andy's Dinosaur Adventures
- Andy's Secret Hideout
- Andy's Wild Workouts
- Andy's Baby Animals
- Andy's Safari Adventures
- Andy's Prehistoric Adventures
- Andy's Aquatic Adventures
- Andy And The Band (originally on CBBC)
- Andy's Dinosaur Toybox
- Andy's Global Adventures
- Andy's Wild Adventures

Day has taken part in the CBeebies Live Arena Tour every year since 2012 and played in the Edinburgh Festival in 2009. He was nominated as Best Presenter at the 2009 BAFTA Children's Awards.

== Other work ==
In addition to Day's work on television with the children's channel CBeebies, Day also hosted a school radio broadcast for reception age children, entitled "Playtime". He hosted this show until 2017, when the broadcaster Steven Kynman took over.

== Andy and the Odd Socks ==
Day also fronts a pop-rock band that makes songs for children, called Andy and the Odd Socks. Originally a studio-based project with Andy and the music producers Rob David and Dan Delor, a full band was formed to enable Andy to perform the songs live (rather than to a backing track as he'd previously done with his Dinosaur Rap performances). The full band was first formed in June 2017 at the Glastonbury festival and has performed at other festivals since. In 2020, they formed the central characters of a CBBC TV show 'Andy and the Band', where the band would help solve fictional fan issues in a manner similar to The Monkees in their TV show, performing older songs and some specifically written for the series (once again, by Day, David and Delor).

They have released 3 studio albums.

- Who Invited This Lot? (2017)
- Who's In The Odd Socks? (2020)
- Odd Socks Calling (2022)

The band features:

- Holly Mallett (as Moxy), drums
- Marcus Ramtohul (as Blu), bass guitar
- Stewart McCheyne (as Cousin Mac), keyboards
- Marcelo Cervone (as Rio), lead guitar

There used to be another keyboardist in the band playing the role of "Random Keith" whose real name is still unknown and was replaced by Mac in early 2018.
