= Andy's Dinosaur Adventures =

UK children's television show

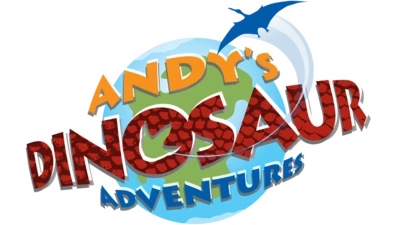
- Genre: Adventure
- Written by: Patrick Makin
- Starring: Andy Day
- Composer: Dan Delor
- Country of origin: United Kingdom
- Original language: English
- No. of seasons: 1
- No. of episodes: 20

Production
- Executive producer: Jonathan Keeling Michael Towner
- Production location: United Kingdom
- Cinematography: Nathan Ridler
- Production company: BBC Natural History Unit

Original release
- Network: CBeebies
- Release: 17 February – 28 March 2014

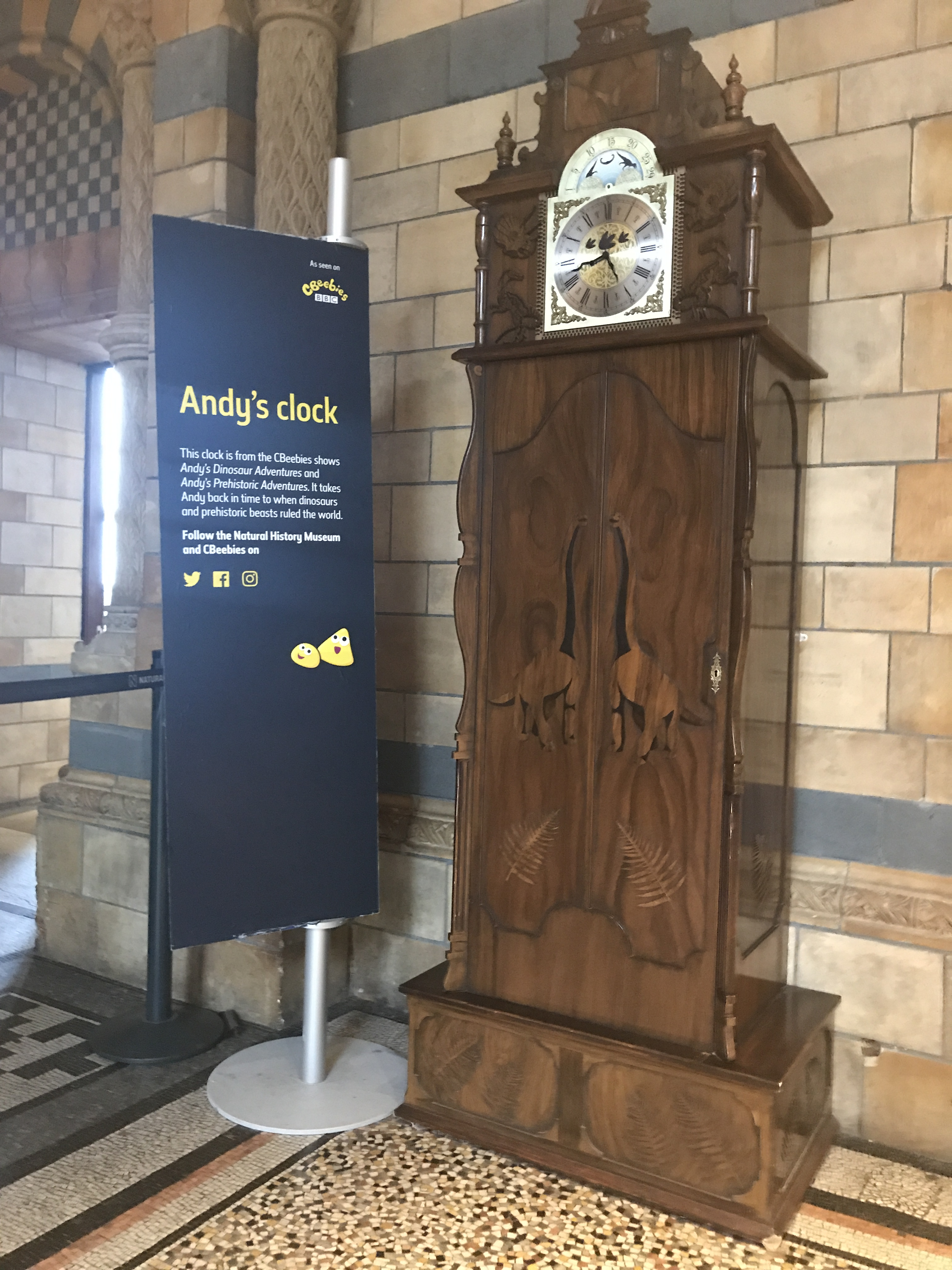
Andy’s Clock Tower in the Natural History Museum, London, 2018

Andy's Dinosaur Adventures is a British television series produced by the BBC Natural History Unit broadcast in 2014 on CBeebies starring Andy Day. Andy's Dinosaur Adventures is the second series of Andy's Adventures and was a joint-commission from CBeebies and BBC Worldwide. It was preceded by Andy's Wild Adventures and followed by Andy's Prehistoric Adventures. A number of other series with Andy were later produced, including Andy's Safari Adventures, Andy's Aquatic Adventures.

== Premise ==
Andy's Dinosaur Adventures is a BBC dinosaur history series for children. It stars Andy Day as the main character (Andy) who works at the National Museum with his co-worker Hatty (Kate Copeland). They work hard to get the museum ready for visitors who are always shown to be children. In each episode, they are shown preparing the newest exhibition before the museum opens and each time a mishap occurs that threatens to delay the opening of the exhibition or to leave the exhibition without a proper display. At this precise moment, the Museum's grandfather clock, which has the ability to go back in time, starts to chime. Andy knows this secret and runs to the clock to go back to the time of the dinosaurs to retrieve whatever is needed for the exhibition. When it's time to return to the present time, Day says: "Time to head back!"

The clock used in the series can be seen in the Natural History Museum between the Central Café and Hintze hall. The building used for external shots is Victoria Rooms, Bristol UK. Internal sequences are filmed at the Natural History Museum.

The series premiered on 17 February 2014 and is available on Xfinity and CBeebies networks.

== Episodes ==
#	Episodes	Broadcast
1	T-Rex and Pumice	17 February 2014
2	Diplodocus and Fern	18 February 2014
3	Leaellynasaura and Egg	19 February 2014
4	Eustreptospondylus and Ammonite	20 February 2014
5	Iberomesornis and Feather	21 February 2014
6	Triceratops and Horn	24 February 2014
7	Cynodont and Lichen	25 February 2014
8	Iguanodon Footprint	26 February 2014
9	Coelophysis and Fish	27 February 2014
10	Ornithocheirus and Sand Dollar	28 February 2014
11	Allosaurus and Dragonfly	3 March 2014
12	Placerias and Red Clay	4 March 2014
13	Muttaburrasaurus and Berries	5 March 2014
14	Brachiosaurus and Monkey Puzzle	6 March 2014
15	T-Rex and Imprint	7 March 2014
16	Stegosaurus and Painting	24 March 2014
17	Diplodocus and Dung	25 March 2014
18	Postosuchus and Teeth	26 March 2014
19	T-Rex and Roar	27 March 2014
20	Allosaurus and Salt	28 March 2014
