= Kipper the Dog =

Children's book character created by Mick Inkpen

Kipper on a street in York, England, on May 4, 2006

Kipper the Dog is a character in a series of books for preschool-age children by British writer Mick Inkpen. The books consist of 49 titles (as of October 2026), which have sold over 8 million copies and have been translated into over 20 languages. The books have also won many awards.

The characters in the Kipper the Dog book series also appear in the animated television series Kipper.

== Characters ==
- Kipper the Dog - The title character of the TV show and books. He is warm-hearted, friendly and curious. Kipper is not at all selfish, though he is known to be a hoarder. Kipper is likely portrayed after beagle, beagle mix or Jack Russell terrier breed.
- Tiger - Kipper's best friend. He is more practical and wise than Kipper. Sometimes Tiger can be very smug and naughty, though he really is a kind dog at heart. Tiger is likely portrayed after Scottish Terrier or schnauzer breed.
- Jake - A friendly, warm-hearted sheepdog who is one of Kipper's best friends. He is a minor character on Kipper. However, he, Kipper and Tiger have had many adventures together.
- Holly - A cheery white dog with brown spots who is one of Kipper's friends.
- Pig - Kipper's other best friend. Pig likes to eat chocolate cakes and cookies and at times can be misjudging.
- Arnold - Pig's toddler cousin who is more aware than Pig and he usually says nothing, but at times he says simple words like "duck" and "igloo". Arnold has many exciting encounters while the older ones are occupied.
- Mouse - A mouse who lives with Kipper at his house.
- The Bleepers - A couple of space aliens and a robot who live on the Moon.

== Books ==
Some of the books have been translated into other languages, including Spanish.

Book title	Date published
The Blue Balloon	1989
Kipper	1991
Kipper's Toybox	1992
Kipper's Birthday	March 1993
Where, Oh Where, is Kipper's Bear?	October 6, 1994
Kipper's Book of Colours (Colors in the US)	1995
Kipper's Book of Opposites	1995
Kipper's Book of Weather	April 24, 1995
Kipper's Snowy Day	September 1, 1996
Honk!	1998
Kipper Has a Party	1998
Splosh!	April 15, 1998
Arnold	April 15, 1998
Sandcastle	April 15, 1998
Kipper's Christmas Eve	December 14, 1998
Butterfly	June 17, 1999
Kipper's Playtime	July 15, 1999
Kipper's Bathtime	July 15, 1999
Kipper's Book of Numbers	July 19, 1999
Kipper's Bedtime	October 21, 1999
Kipper's Sticky Paws	June 19, 2000
Kipper's Snacktime	March 1, 2000
Swing!	August 1, 2000
Kipper in the Snow	August 1, 2000
Kipper's A to Z: An Alphabet Adventure	October 19, 2000
Kipper and Roly	January 1, 2001
Thing!	April 19, 2001
Kipper's Monster	April 24, 2001
Picnic	March 1, 2001
Hissss!	March 1, 2001
Kipper and the Egg	March 26, 2001
Kipper's Sunny Day	June 1, 2001
Kipper's Rainy Day	June 14, 2001
Miaow! (Meow! in the US)	August 1, 2001
Skates	September 1, 2001
Rocket	September 1, 2001
Kipper's Surprise	January 1, 2002
Kipper's Balloon	2002
Kipper's Kite	March 14, 2002
Kipper's Lost Ball	April 18, 2002
Kipper's Tree House	April 18, 2002
Kipper's Beach Ball	June 12, 2003
One Year with Kipper	September 21, 2006
Playtime!	July 15, 2007
Hide Me, Kipper!	September 2009
Kipper's Little Friends	June 30, 2015
Kipper's Visitor	February 25, 2016
Kipper's New Pet	June 7, 2016

== TV series ==
Kipper is a British animated children's television series based on the Kipper the Dog picture book series which ran from 1997 until 2000.

== Promotion ==
=== Educational Value ===
The book series were reviewed by Dr. Helen Bradford as ideal for babies and toddlers, teaching them object recognition, interaction with toys, learning first words, and associating the story with their reading environment.

=== Awards ===
- Winner of BAFTA for Preschool Animation in 1998, 2000 and 2001.
- Publishers Weekly named Kipper as one of the Best Children's Books in 2001.
- Annecy International Animated Film Festival '98 award, TV Series, Special Prize (up to 12 minutes).
- Silver Pulcinella Award, 1999, Best Series for Infants
- Dove Foundation, Dove Family-Approved Suitable for all ages. Tiger Tales and Pools, Parks and Picnics.
