= Gidea Park =

Suburb of Havering, east London, England

Coordinates: 51.5926°N 0.2025°E

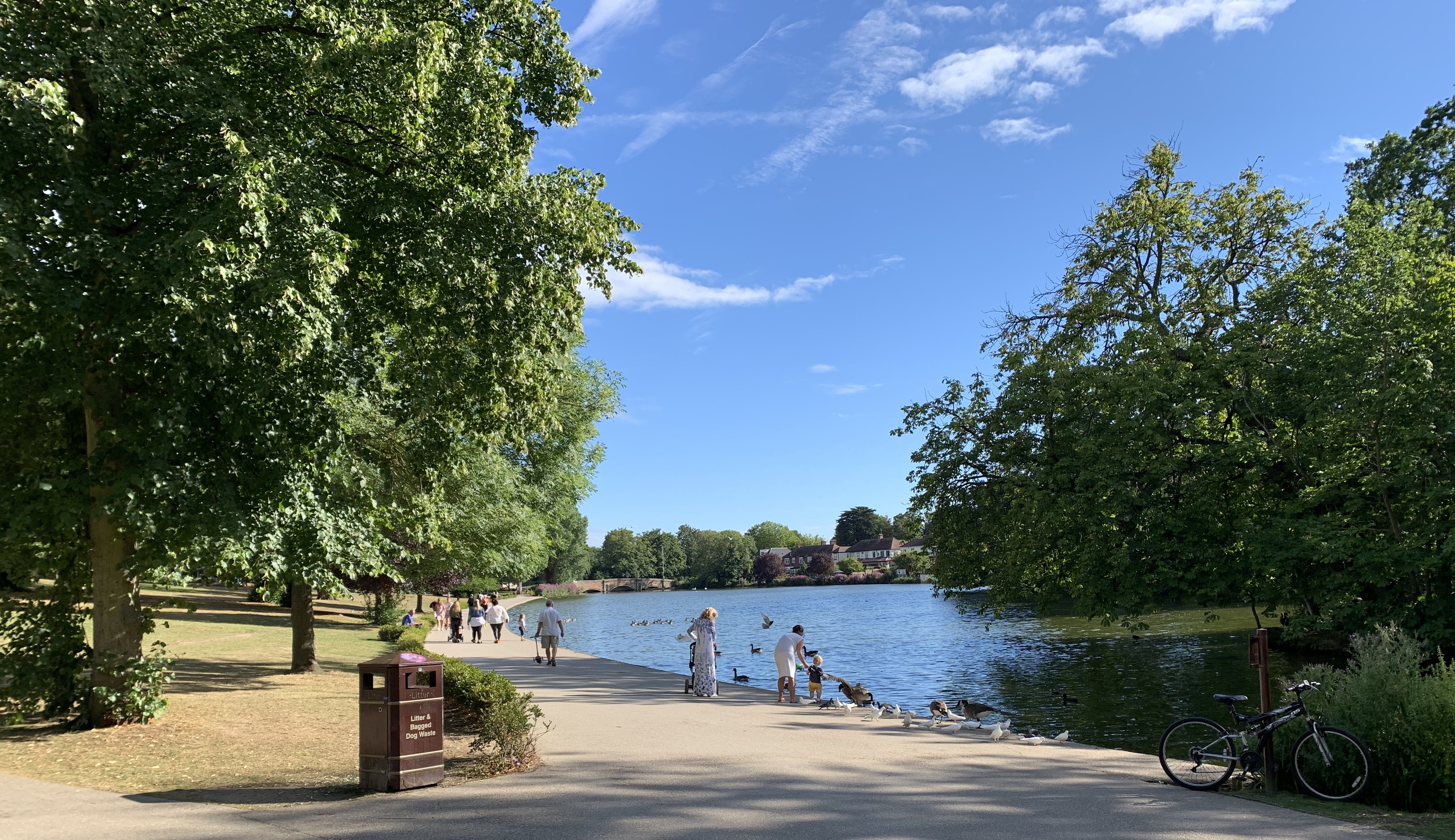
- The lake at Raphael Park in Gidea Park

- Location within Greater London
- OS grid reference: TQ525905
  - Charing Cross: 15.2 mi (24.5 km) WSW
- London borough: Havering
- Ceremonial county: Greater London
- Region: London
- Country: England
- Sovereign state: United Kingdom
- Post town: ROMFORD
- Postcode district: RM2
- Dialling code: 01708
- Police: Metropolitan
- Fire: London
- Ambulance: London
- UK Parliament: Romford
- London Assembly: Havering and Redbridge

Gidea Park (/ˈɡɪdiə/) is a neighbourhood in the east of Romford in the London Borough of Havering, south-east England. Predominantly an affluent and residential area, it was historically located in the county of Essex. It saw significant expansion in the early 20th century, with exhibitions of housing and town planning (the first being known as Romford Garden Suburb) and the construction of a railway station on the main line out from London Liverpool Street station.

== History ==
=== Early history ===
Thomas Cooke, a Suffolk man who became London Mayor in 1462, was granted a Royal Charter for Royal Liberty of Havering-atte-Bower, which enabled him to build a country house, which he named "Geddy Hall". The word "geddy" was so named after the lake and its livestock; ged (meaning pike) and ea (water). The house remained unfinished for at least a century, because of his numerous incarcerations in the Tower of London for high treason. Upon his death in 1478, the estate was passed down through the Cooke family and eventually to his great-grandson, Anthony Cooke, who was a tutor for Edward VI. After a brief period abroad, Anthony returned to Havering and completed the building of Geddy Hall, which later became Gidea Hall.

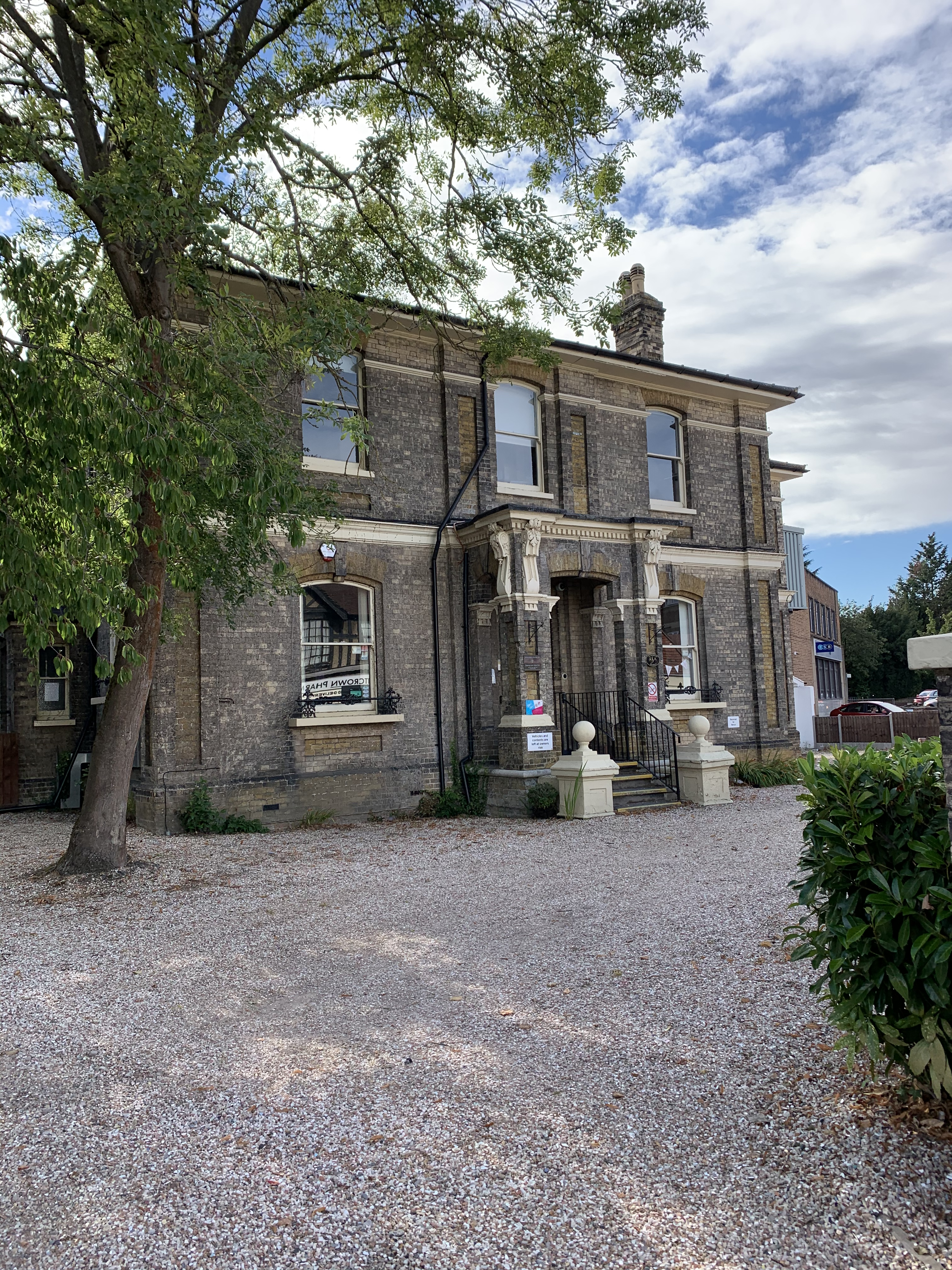
The former Balgores House, dating from the 1850s, is today a preparatory school

In 1657, the hall and its grounds were sold to Richard Emes, a local businessman, for £9,000. Upon the Restoration, the estate was bought back by the Crown and passed through the ownerships of various nobilities, before eventually being sold through public auction, shortly before the Coronation of Queen Victoria.

=== Exhibition houses ===
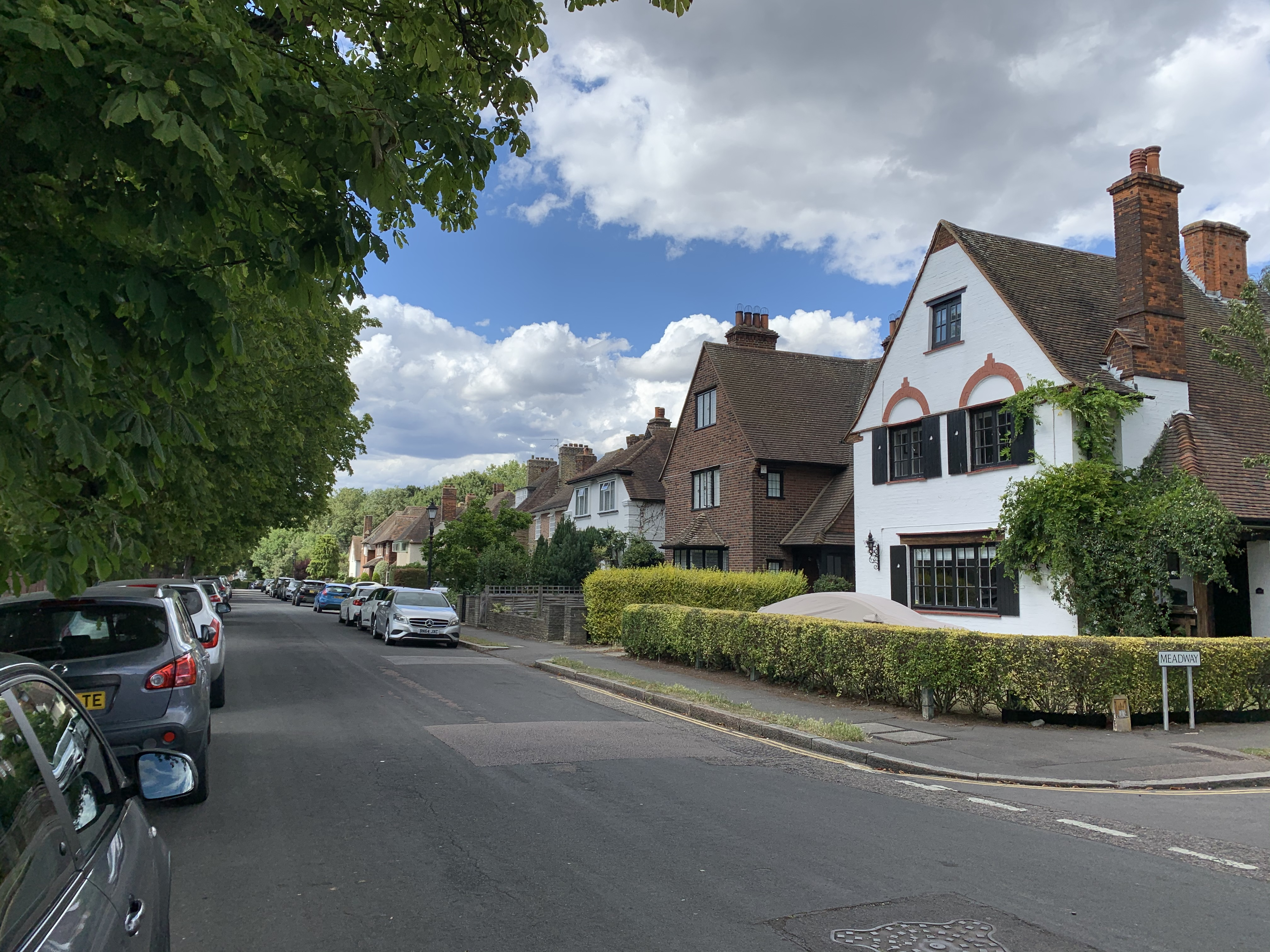
Exhibition houses on Parkway, overlooking Raphael park

Each property had a drawing and description published in The Book of the Exhibition of Houses and Cottages, 1911

In 1909 Herbert Raphael, John Tudor Walters and Charles McCurdy, three Liberal Members of Parliament (MPs) who had links with the Hampstead Garden Suburb development, formed a company with the objective of building a new garden suburb on the Gidea Hall estate. Raphael also reached agreement with the Great Eastern Railway for the new Squirrels Heath and Gidea Park railway station on the main line from London Liverpool Street to serve the new suburb.

Romford Garden Suburb was constructed between July 1910 and June 1911 on the Gidea Hall and Balgores estates (respectively north and south of Hare Street, now called Main Road) as an exhibition of town planning. A total of 159 cottages and houses were designed by more than 100 architects, many of them of considerable reputation. Most of the cottages were built in Risebridge Road and Meadway; most of the houses were built in Parkway and Reed Pond Walk. A smaller number of Exhibition houses were also constructed on the Balgores estate, such as in Squirrels Heath Avenue and Balgores Lane.

Competitions were held to select the best town planning scheme for the suburb, and the best designs for houses resulted in those being sold at a well-above average £500 and cottages at £375. Of the 159 properties, 132 were entered into the competitions. The winner of the best designed house was No. 54 Parkway by Geoffry Lucas and the best cottage was No. 36 Meadway, designed by C. M. Crickmer. A competition for the builders for best workmanship was won by Falkner & Son who built No. 35 Meadway and No. 43 Heath Drive.

Known today as the "Exhibition houses", and set in their garden suburb known as the "Exhibition estate", the properties are fine examples of the domestic architecture of their time and are a significant feature of the Gidea Park area. Six of them are now listed buildings: Nos. 41 and 43 Heath Drive, Nos. 16 and 27 Meadway and Nos. 36 and 38 Reed Pond Walk.

A further 35 houses, mostly of contemporary flat-roofed design, were built in 1934–35 in Heath Drive, Brook Road, and Eastern Avenue for a Modern Homes Exhibition. One such house, No. 64 Heath Drive, by Berthold Lubetkin's Tecton Group architectural group, was the special responsibility of Francis Skinner and is now also a listed structure. The area was provided with a parish church in the form of St Michael's Church, Gidea Park in 1931.

The area was designated a conservation area in 1970.

== Governance ==
For elections to Havering London Borough Council, Gidea Park is divided between the Squirrels Heath, Marshalls and Rise Park, and St. Edward's wards.

== Geography ==
Gidea Park is approximately 15 miles (24 km) east of Charing Cross and 1 mile (1.6 km) east of Romford town centre.

It is south-west of the Gallows Corner junction where the A12, A127 and A118 roads meet.

The area to the south of Gidea Park station was known as Squirrels Heath.

Harold Wood is to the east of Gidea Park, Ardleigh Green and Emerson Park are to the south-east, and Hornchurch is to the south.

== Society and leisure ==
The Royal Liberty School in Upper Brentwood Road was the first school in Britain (and possibly in Europe) to install an electronic computer (an Elliot 903), in 1965.

Romford Hockey Club is based in Gidea Park. It is also the location of Gidea Park Lawn Tennis Club, Romford Golf Club, and two public parks: Lodge Farm and Raphael park. There are also a number of shops, pubs, restaurants and a library (closed March 31st, 2025).

Essex County Cricket Club played first-class cricket at the Gidea Park Sports Ground between 1950 and 1968.

== Transport ==
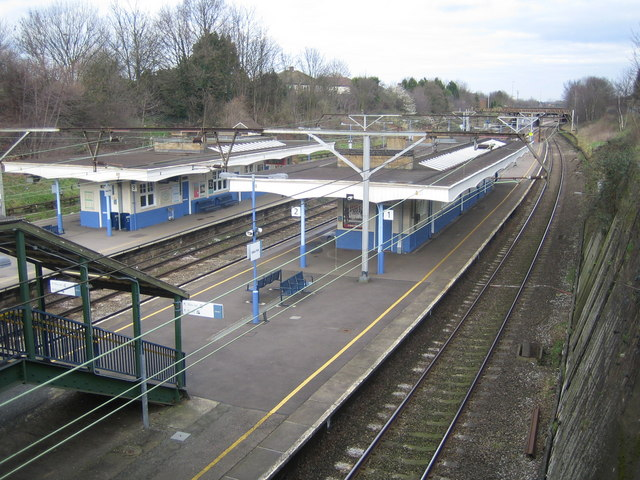
Gidea Park station in 2007

Gidea Park railway station is on the Great Eastern Main Line; it is served by Elizabeth line trains between Shenfield, London Liverpool Street, London Paddington and Heathrow Terminal 5.

Romford railway station is the next station on the line towards London. It sees additional express and stopping services to and from Liverpool Street, operated by Greater Anglia; it is also the terminus of a branch line to Upminster.

A number of London Bus routes run through Gidea Park towards Romford, Lakeside Shopping Centre, Dagenham, Harold Hill, Harold Wood, Gallows Corner and Brentwood; these are operated by Stagecoach London and Blue Triangle.
