= List of non-fiction writers =

The term non-fiction writer covers vast fields. This list includes those with a Wikipedia page who had non-fiction works published.

- Countries named are where authors worked for long periods.
- Subject codes: A (architecture), Aa (applied arts), Af (armed forces), Ag (agriculture), Ar (archaeology, prehistory), B (business, finance), Ba (ballet), Bg (biography), Bk (books), C (cookery, housekeeping), Cr (crime, disasters), D (drama, film), E (economics), Ed (education, child care), F (feminism, role of women), Fa (fashion), Fi (fine arts), G (gardening), H (history, antiquarianism), I (information technology), J (journalism, broadcasting), L (language), Lc (literary criticism), Lw (law), Ma (mathematics), Me (medicine, health), Mu (music), N (natural sciences), Nh (natural history, environment), O (opera), P (polymath), Ph (philosophy), Po (politics, government), Ps (psychology), R (religion, metaphysics), S (social sciences, society), Sp (sports, games, hunting), T (travel, localities), Tr (transport)
- Language is mentioned where unclear.
- A single book title exemplifying an author also needs a Wikipedia page for inclusion.

== A ==
- Jane Aaron (born 1951, Wales, Ed) in Welsh and English
- Richard Aaron (1901–1987, Wales, Ph) in Welsh and English
- Ivar Aasen (1813–1896, Norway, L)
- Edward Abbey (1927–1989, US, Nh); Desert Solitaire
- Edwin Abbott Abbott (1838–1926, England, Ed/R)
- Hayatte Abdou (Comoros Island, J)
- Tomoji Abe (阿部知二, 1903–1973, Japan, Lc)
- John Abercrombie (1726–1806, Scotland, G)
- David Abercromby (died c. 1702, Scotland, M)
- Patrick Abercromby (1656 – c. 1716, Scotland, H/Mi)
- Virginia Abernethy (born 1934, US, Ps)
- Johann Georg Abicht (1672–1740, Germany, R) in Latin
- Johann Heinrich Abicht (1762–1816, Germany, Ph)
- Minnie F. Abrams (1859-1912, US, R)
- Peter Ackroyd (born 1949, England, Bg/Lc)
- Eliza Acton (1799–1859, England, C); Modern Cookery for Private Families
- Alexander Adam (1741–1809, Scotland, L/H)
- James Adam (1860–1907, Scotland/England, H/Lc)
- Ruth Adam (1907–1977, England, F)
- Douglas Adams (1952–2001, England, Nh)
- Jad Adams (born 1954, England, J)
- William Henry Davenport Adams (1828–1891, England, P)
- Henry Adamson (1581–1637, Scotland, H)
- John Adamson (1787–1955, England, H)
- Joy Adamson (1910–1980, Austrian Empire/Kenya, Nh); Born Free
- Alison Adburgham (1912–1997, England, H)
- Jane Addams (1860–1935, US, Po/F)
- Joseph Addison (1672–1719, England, J/P)
- Lucia H. Faxon Additon (1847–1919, US, H/S)
- Adomnán (c. 624–704, Scotland, Bg) in Latin; Vita Columbae
- Julia Cartwright Ady (1851–1924, England, Fi/H)
- Aelred of Rievaulx (1110–1167, England, R/Bg); Relatio de Standardo
- Franz Aepinus (1724–1802, Germany/Russia, N)
- Chandrashekhar Agashe (1888–1956, India, B)
- Shimon Agassi (1852–1914, Iraq, R)
- Louis Agassiz (1807–1873, Switzerland/US, N) in French and English
- Pedro Agerre (Axular, 17th century, Spain, R) in Basque; Gero
- Sven Aggesen (born c. 1140–50, Denmark, H) in Latin
- Maria Gaetana Agnesi (1718–1799, Italy, Ma/Ph)
- Heinrich Cornelius Agrippa (1486–1535, Germany/France, P) in Latin
- Silvia Agüero (born 1985, Spain, F)
- Carmen Agulló Díaz (born 1957, Spain, Ed)
- Shaykh Ahmad (1753–1826, Ottoman Empire, R) in Arabic
- John Aikin (1747–1822, England, M)
- Lucy Aikin (1781–1864, England, H/Bg)
- Jean Aitchison (born 1938, England, L/Ps)
- Albert of Aix (fl. c. 1100, Germany, H) in Latin
- Eva Allen Alberti (1856–1938, US, D)
- Albertus Magnus (c. 1193–1280, Germany, Ph/R) in Latin
- Madeleine Albright (1937–2022, US, Po/H)
- Thomas Aldham (c. 1616–1660, England, R)
- Richard Aldington (1892–1962, England/France, Bg)
- Nelson W. Aldrich (1841–1915, US, Po)
- Bernhard Alexander (1850–1927, Hungary, Ph)
- Horace Alexander (1889–1989, India/US, Po/Nh)
- Nelson Algren (1909–1981, US, T); Chicago: City on the Make
- Abdullah Yusuf Ali (1872–1953, India/England, R); The Holy Qur'an: Text, Translation and Commentary
- Syed Ameer Ali (1849–1928, India/England, Po/R); The Spirit of Islam
- Tariq Ali (born 1943, Pakistan/England, Po); The Obama Syndrome
- Archibald Alison (1757–1839, Scotland/England, P)
- Sir Archibald Alison, 1st Baronet (1792–1867, Scotland/England, H)
- William Alison (1790–1859, Scotland, M/S)
- Hortense Allart (1801–1879, France, F)
- Grant Allen (1848–1899, Canada/England, N)
- Mary Sophia Allen (1878–1964, England, S/Cr)
- Richard Allestree (1621/2–1681, England, R)
- György Almásy (1867–1933, Hungary/Austria, Nh/T)
- Vincent Alsop (c. 1630–1703, England, R)
- Louis Althusser (1918–1990, France, Ph); Reading Capital
- Günter Altner (1936–2011, Germany, Nh/Ph)
- Mor Altshuler (born 1957, Israel, R)
- Stephen Ambrose (1936–2002, US, H/Bg)
- Joseph Ames (1689–1759, England, B/H)
- Nicholas Amhurst (1697–1742, England, Po)
- Martin Amis (1949–2023, England, Es); The War Against Cliché
- Gabriele Amorth (1925–2016, Italy, R)
- Thomas Amory (c. 1691–1788, Ireland/England, P)
- Sheldon Amos (1835–1886, England, Lw/S)
- André-Marie Ampère (1775–1836, France, N)
- Moses Amyraut (1596–1664, France, R)
- John Anderdon (1792–1874, England, Sp/R)
- Adam Anderson (1692 or 1693–1765, Scotland, Ec)
- Alan Orr Anderson (1879–1958, Scotland, H)
- Benedict Anderson (1936–2015, US, Po/H); Imagined Communities
- James Anderson (1662–1728, Scotland, H)
- James Anderson of Hermiston (1739–1808, Scotland, Ag/Ec)
- John Anderson (1726–1796, Scotland, N/Ed)
- Marjorie Ogilvie Anderson (1909–2002, Scotland, H)
- Patrick Anderson (fl. 1618–1635, Scotland, M)
- Robert Anderson (1841–1918, Ireland/England, M/Cr)
- Terry L. Anderson (living, US, Ec/Nh)
- Lou Andreas-Salomé (1861–1937, Russian Empire/Germany, Ps)
- Norman Angell (1872–1967, England, Po); The Great Illusion
- Domenico Angelo (1717–1802, Italy/England, Sp)
- Maya Angelou (1928–2014, US, Po); I Know Why the Caged Bird Sings
- Kenneth Anger (1927–2023, US, D); Hollywood Babylon
- Charlotte Anley (1796–1893, England, S/R)
- Kofi Annan (1938–2018, Ghana, Po)
- Ali Ansari (born 1967, England/Scotland, H/Po)
- Anselm of Canterbury (c. 1033–1109, France/England, R); Cur Deus Homo
- Peter Anson (1889–1975, England, R/A)
- Lawrence Anthony (1950–2012, South Africa, Nh/Po); Babylon's Ark
- Sulpicius Apollinaris (2nd c. AD, Carthage, L)
- Péter Apor (1676–1752, Hungary, H) in Latin
- Arjun Appadurai (born 1949, US, S)
- Charles James Apperley (Nimrod, 1777–1843, Wales/England, Sp)
- Adolphe Appia (1862–1928, Switzerland, D/N)
- Kwame Anthony Appiah (born 1954, England/US, Ph)
- John Arbuthnot (1667–1735, Scotland/England M/P)
- Hannah Arendt (1906–1975, Germany/US, Po); The Human Condition
- Lykke Aresin (1921–2011, Germany, Me)
- Dan Ariely (born 1967, US, Ps); Predictably Irrational
- Philippe Ariès (1914–1984, France, H); Centuries of Childhood
- Aristotle (384–322 BC, Ancient Greece, Ph/N); Corpus Aristotelicum
- Aleksander Arkuszyński (1918–2016, Poland Af)
- Karen Armstrong (born 1944, England, R); Muhammad: A Biography of the Prophet
- Ron Arnold (1937–2022, US, Nh)
- Sarah Louise Arnold (1859–1943, US, Ed)
- Thomas James Arnold (c. 1804–1877, England, Lw)
- Hugo Arnot (1749–1786, Scotland, Lw)
- Arrian of Nicomedia (c. 86/89 – post-AD 146/160, Ancient Greece, H/Ph); The Anabasis of Alexander
- Pat Arrowsmith (1930–2023, England, Po)
- Vladimir Arsenyev (1872–1930, Russian Empire/Soviet Union, T)
- John Asgill (1659–1738, England, R/Lw)
- Russell Ash (1946–2010, England, J); The Top 10 of Everything
- Elizabeth Ashbridge (1713–1755, US, R/Bg)
- Michael Asher (born 1953, England, T)
- Anthony Ashley-Cooper, 3rd Earl of Shaftesbury (1671–1713, England/Italy, Po/Ph)
- Anastasia M. Ashman (born 1964, US, I/T)
- Isaac Asimov (1920–1992, US, N); The Intelligent Man's Guide to Science
- Aemilius Asper (1st or 2nd c. AD, Ancient Rome, L)
- Margot Asquith (1864–1945, Scotland, S)
- Mary Astell (1666–1731, England, F)
- Jean Astruc (1684–1766, France, M/R)
- Mary Alderson Chandler Atherton (1849–1934, US, Ed)
- Ali ibn al-Athir (1160–1233, Seljuq Empire, H/Bg); The Complete History
- Diane Atkinson (living, England, H)
- David Attenborough (born 1926, England, Nh)
- Margaret Atwood (born 1939, Canada, Nh); Payback: Debt and the Shadow Side of Wealth
- John Aubrey (1626–1697, England, H/Bg); Brief Lives
- W. H. Auden (1907–1973, England/US, Lc); Forewords and Afterwords
- Marcus Aurelius (AD 121–180, Ancient Rome, Po/Ph) in Greek; Meditations
- Ralph Austen (c. 1612–1676, England, G)
- John Austin (1790–1859, England, Lw); The Province of Jurisprudence Determined
- Mary Therese Austin (died 1889, US, D/T)
- Avicenna (c. 980–1037, Persia, P/M); The Book of Healing
- Jack Avon (born 1967, England, B)
- A. J. Ayer (1910–1989, England, Ph); Language, Truth and Logic
- Joseph Ayloffe (1708–1781, England, Ar)
- Ed Ayres (born 1941, US, J/Nh)
- Ed Ayres (Australia, Mu, Bg)
- Iwao Ayusawa (鮎沢巌, 1894–1972, Japan, S)

== B ==
- Charles Babbage (1791–1871, England, P)
- Rebeca Baceiredo (born 1979, Spain, Ph)
- Samuel Bache (1804–1876, England, R)
- James Backhouse (1794–1869, England/Australia, T/S)
- Alice Mabel Bacon (1858–1918, US/Japan, Ed)
- Robert Baden-Powell (1857–1941, England, S/Ed); Scouting for Boys
- Élisabeth Badinter (born 1944, France, Ph/H)
- William Balfour Baikie (1824–1864, Scotland/Nigeria, Nh/L)
- Alice Bailey (1880–1949, England/US, R)
- Florence Augusta Merriam Bailey (1863–1948, US, Nh)
- Frederick Marshman Bailey (1882–1967, India/England, N/T)
- Harold Walter Bailey (1899–1996, Australia/England, L)
- Ronald Bailey (born 1953, US, Ec/Nh)
- Sarah Lord Bailey (1856–1922, England/US, D)
- Vernon Orlando Bailey (1864–1942, US, Nh)
- John Bainbridge (born 1953, England, Nh)
- Roland Bainton (1894–1984, US, H)
- Fredrik Bajer (1837–1922, Denmark, Po)
- Henry Baker (1698–1774, England, R/Ed); A Short Essay on Speech
- J. A. Baker (1926–1987, England, Nh/T)
- Samuel White Baker (1821–1893, England, T/Po)
- Mikhail Bakhtin (1895–1975, Soviet Union, Ph/L)
- Georges Balandier (1920–2016, France, S)
- Emily Greene Balch (1867–1961, US, S)
- James Baldwin (1924–1987, US, Po); The Fire Next Time
- John Bale (1495–1563, England/Ireland, R/H)
- Lady Eve Balfour (1899–1990, England, Nh); The Living Soil
- Zygmunt Balicki (1858–1916, Poland, S/Po)
- Patrick Balfour, 3rd Baron Kinross (1904–1976, Scotland, H/Bg)
- Charles Ball (born 1780, US, Bg)
- Zsófia Balla (born 1949, Romania/Hungary, J) in Hungarian
- Étienne Baluze (1630–1718, France, H) in Latin and French
- Samuel Bamford (1788–1872, England, P/L)
- Linda Vero Ban (born 1976, Hungary, R/S)
- Zsófia Bán (born 1957, Hungary, Lc)
- George Bancroft (1800–1891, US, H/Po)
- Richard Bannatyne (died 1605, Scotland, R/H)
- John Bannerman (historian) (1932–2008, Scotland, H)
- Anna Laetitia Barbauld (1743–1825, England, Ed/Lc); Lessons for Children
- Dominic Barberi (Domenico Giovanni Barberi, 1792–1849, Italy/England, R)
- Paul Barbette (1620 – c. 1666, Netherlands, M) in Dutch and Latin
- Teresita de Barbieri (1937–2018, Uruguay/Mexico, F/S)
- Robert Barclay (1648–1690, Scotland, R)
- William Barclay (1546–1608, Scotland/France, Lw)
- William Barclay (c. 1570 – c. 1630, Scotland/France, M/P)
- Bruce Barcott (living, US, Nh)
- Molly Lyons Bar-David (1910-1987, Canada/Israel, C)
- Charles Foster Barham (1804–1884, England, M)
- Bill Barich (born 1943, US, J/T)
- Sabine Baring-Gould (1834–1924, England, R/H)
- Clement Barksdale (1609–1687, England, P)
- Frank Barlow (1911–2009, England, H/Bg)
- Thomas Barlow (1608/1609–1691, England, R/Lw)
- Ferdinánd Barna (1825–1895, Hungary, L)
- John Barnard (died 1683, England, Bg)
- Peter Barnes (born 1940, US, J/Nh)
- William Barnes (1801–1886, England, L)
- Thomas P. M. Barnett (born 1962, US, Mi/Po)
- John Baron (1786–1851, Scotland/England, M)
- Cesare Baronio (1538–1607, Italy, H/R) in Latin; Annales Ecclesiastici
- Damian Barr (born 1976, Scotland/England, S)
- William Barr (born 1940, Scotland/Canada, H)
- Geoffrey Barraclough (1908–1984, England, H)
- John Barret (1631–1713, England, R)
- Isaac Barrow (1630–1677, England, R/Ma)
- John Barrow (fl. 1735–1774, England, H/Ma)
- John Barrow (1764–1848, England, Af); The Eventful History of the Mutiny and Piratical Seizure of HMS Bounty
- Roland Barthes (1915–1980, France, Lc/Ph); Mythologies
- Frederic Bartlett (1886–1969, England, Ps)
- John Barton (1755–1789, England, Po/S)
- John Bartram (1699–1777, Pennsylvania, Nh)
- Frédéric Bastiat (1801–1850, France, E/Lw)
- Georges Bataille (1897–1962, France, P); La Part maudite
- Albert Bates (born 1947, US, Nh)
- Daisy Bates (1859–1951, Australia, S/T)
- Daisy Bates (1914–1999, US, Cr/S)
- Henry Walter Bates (1825–1892, England, Nh/T); The Naturalist on the River Amazons
- Katharine Lee Bates (1859–1929, US, Lc/T)
- Angelica Bäumer (1932–2025, Austria, H)
- Helen Bayes (born 1944, Australia, Ed/R)
- John Bayley (1925–2015, England, Lc)
- Peter Bayley (1921–2015, England, Lc)
- Dorothea Beale (1831–1906, England, Ed/H)
- Mary Beard (born 1955, England, H); The Roman Triumph
- Clara Bancroft Beatley (1858–1923, US, R)
- Alistair Beaton (born 1947, Scotland, PO)
- James Beattie (1735–1803, Scotland, Ph/R); An Essay on the Nature and Immutability of Truth
- Cari Beauchamp (1949–2023, US, H/J)
- Simone de Beauvoir (1908–1986, France, Ph/S); The Second Sex
- August Bebel (1840–1913, Germany, Po)
- Gary Becker (1930–2014, US, E)
- Gilbert Abbott à Beckett (1811–1856, England, S); The Comic History of England
- Sharon Beder (living, Australia, Nh/Po); Global Spin: The Corporate Assault on Environmentalism
- Sybille Bedford (1911–2006, France/England, T/Bg)
- William Beebe (1877–1962, US, Nh)
- Alice D. Engley Beek (1876–1951, US, Fi)
- Mrs. Beeton (1836–1865, England, C); Mrs Beeton's Book of Household Management
- Antony Beevor (born 1946, England, H/Mi)
- John Hay Beith (Ian Hay, 1876–1952, England, H/Mi)
- Adrian Bell (1901–1980, England, Ag/J)
- Art Bell (1945–2018, US, J/Nh); The Coming Global Superstorm (co-authored)
- Catherine Bell (1953–2008, US, R)
- Charles Bell (1774–1842, Scotland, N/M)
- Clive Bell (1881–1964, England, Fi)
- Gertrude Bell (1868–1926, England/Iraq, T/Ar)
- Henry Hesketh Bell (1864–1952, England, P)
- Julia Bell (1879–1979, England, M)
- John Bell (1763–1820, Scotland, M)
- Quentin Bell (1910–1996, England, Bg)
- Pierino Belli (1502–1575, Piedmont, Mi/Lw)
- Hilaire Belloc (1870–1953, England, J/S); The Servile State
- William Benbow (1787–1864, England, Po/R)
- Tom Bender (living, US, Nh)
- Elizabeth Benger (1775–1827, England, Bg)
- Caroline Benn (1926–2000, England, Ed)
- Melissa Benn (born 1957, England, F/Ed)
- Tony Benn (Anthony Wedgwood Benn, 1925–2014, Po/S)
- Anne McGrew Bennett (1903–1986, US, F/R)
- Arnold Bennett (1867–1931, England, Lc); Literary Taste: How to Form It
- Godfrey Benson, 1st Baron Charnwood (1864–1945, England, Po/S)
- Lewis Benson (1906–1986, US, R)
- Jeremy Bentham (1748–1832, England, Ph/S); An Introduction to the Principles of Morals and Legislation
- Richard Bentley (1662–1742, England, Lc/R)
- Caroline French Benton (died 1923, US, C)
- Kristina Berdynskykh (b. 1983, Ukraine, J/Po)
- Edward Berdoe (1836–1916, England, Lc/M)
- Howard W. Bergerson (1922–2011, US, L); Palindromes and Anagrams
- Henri Bergson (1859–1941, France, Ph)
- George Berkeley (1685–1753, Ireland/England, H/R); A Treatise Concerning the Principles of Human Knowledge
- Alexander Berkman (1870–1936, Russian Empire/US, Po); Prison Memoirs of an Anarchist
- Tzeporah Berman (born 1969, Canada, Nh/Po)
- Nicholas Bernard (1600–1661, Ireland, R/Bg)
- Eric Berne (1910–1970, Canada/US, Ps); Games People Play
- Sarah Bernhardt (1844–1923, France, Lc)
- Hilda Bernstein (1915–2006, England/South Africa, Po/F); The World that was Ours
- William J. Bernstein (born 1948, US, B)
- Choly Berreteaga (1927–2018, Argentina, C)
- Joseph Bertrand (1822–1900, France, Ma/E)
- Dennison Berwick (born 1956, England/Canada, T)
- Betty Berzon (1928–2006, US, Ps)
- Annie Besant (1847–1933, England, Ps/S); Study in Consciousness
- Richard Bessel (living, England, H)
- Henry Beston (1888–1968, US, Nh); The Outermost House
- Mary Matilda Betham (1776–1852, England, Bg/F)
- Matilda Betham-Edwards (1836–1919, England, T)
- Christopher Bethell (1773–1859, England/Wales, R)
- Annie Betts (1884–1961, England, Nh)
- Erskine Beveridge (1851–1920, Scotland, H)
- Elizabeth Beverley (19th c., England, D/S)
- L. S. Bevington (1845–1895, England, R/Po)
- Tom Beynon (1886–1961, Wales, R)
- Homi K. Bhabha (born 1949, India/England, Lc/S)
- Hester Biddle (c. 1629–1697, England, R)
- Ella A. Bigelow (1849–1917, US, H)
- Noah Biggs (mid 17th c., England, M/R)
- J. Brent Bill (born 1941, US, R)
- James H. Billington (1929–2018, US, H)
- Jennie M. Bingham (1859–1933, US, Bg/R)
- Robert O. Binnewies (born 1937, US, Nh)
- Laurence Binyon (1869–1943, England, Fi)
- T. J. Binyon (1936–2004, England, L/Lc)
- Clementina Black (1853–1922, England, Po/F)
- David Macleod Black (born 1941, Scotland/England, Ps)
- Brian Black (living, US, Nh)
- Helen Cecelia Black (1838–1906, England, Bk/Bg)
- J. B. Black (1883–1964, Scotland, H)
- Jeremy Black (born 1955, England, H)
- Margaret Moyes Black (1853–1935, Scotland, Bg)
- Sarah Blackborow (17th c., England, R)
- John Stuart Blackie (1809–1895, Scotland, P)
- Thomas Blackwell (1701–1757, Scotland, H)
- James Blades (1901–1999, England, Mu)
- William Garden Blaikie (1820–1899, Scotland, R/Bg)
- Geoffrey Blainey (born 1930, Australia, H); The Tyranny of Distance: How Distance Shaped Australia's History
- Claude Blair (1922–2010, England, Af)
- H. Emerson Blake (living, US, Nh)
- Richard Paul Blakeney (1820–1884, Ireland/England, R)
- Charles Blanc (1813–1882, France, Aa/Fi)
- Lesley Blanch (1904–2007, England/France, Bg/C); The Wilder Shores of Love
- I. M. E. Blandin (1838–1912, US, H)
- Evangeline Wilbour Blashfield (1858–1918, US, H/Jo)
- Yaakov Blau (1929–2013, Palestine/Israel, R)
- Barbara Blaugdone (c. 1609–1704, England, R)
- Helena Blavatsky (1831–1891, Russia, Ph/R); The Voice of the Silence
- Emily Rose Bleby (1849–1917, Jamaica/UK, Ed/S/Po)
- Mathilde Blind (1841–1896, England, Bg/Lc)
- Walter Blith (1605–1654, England, Ag)
- Marc Bloch (1886–1944, France, H); The Historian's Craft
- Allan Bloom (1930–1992, US, Ph/E); The Closing of the American Mind
- Charles Blount (1654–1693, England, R/Ph)
- Heston Blumenthal (born 1966, England, C)
- Edmund Blunden (1896–1974, England, H/Lc)
- Edward Wilmot Blyden (1832–1912, Liberia, E/Po)
- Czesław Bobrowski (1904–1996, Poland, E)
- Cornelius Bocchus (1st c. AD, Roman Hispania, Nh)
- John Bodenham (c. 1559–1610, England, Lc)
- Barbara Bodichon (1827–1891, England, F/R)
- Hector Boece (Boethius, 1465–1536, Scotland, Ph/H)
- Sandra Boehringer (born 1972, France, F/H)
- Boethius (Anicius Manlius Severinus Boëthius, c. 480–524, Ancient Rome, Ph/H); The Consolation of Philosophy
- Barry Bogin (born 1950, US, S)
- Eugen Böhm von Bawerk (1851–1914, Austrian Empire, E); Capital and Interest
- Edmund Bohun (1645–1699, England, H/Po); History of the Desertion
- Nicolas Boileau-Despréaux (1636–1711, France, Lc)
- Alan Bold (1943–1998, Scotland, Bg)
- Jeff Bollow (born 1971, US, J)
- Bernard Bolzano (1781–1848, Bohemia, Ph/R); in German; The Paradoxes of the Infinite
- Henry Bond (born 1966, England, Lc)
- Jan Bondeson (born 1962, Sweden/England, M)
- Edith Bone (1889–1975, Hungary/England, M/Po)
- Ada Boni (1881–1973, Italy, C); Il talismano della felicità
- Edward Bonner (c. 1500–1569, England, R)
- Hypatia Bradlaugh Bonner (1858–1935, England, Po/R)
- Marie-Jo Bonnet (born 1949, France, F/Fi)
- Murray Bookchin (1921–2006, US, Nh); Our Synthetic Environment
- Christopher Booker (1937–2019, England, Nh/J); The Real Global Warming Disaster
- Luke Booker (1762–1835, England, R)
- George Boole (1815–1864, England/Ireland, Ma/Ph); The Laws of Thought
- Charles Booth (1840–1916, E); Life and Labour of the People in London
- Wayne C. Booth (1921–2005, US, Lc)
- William "Cocktail" Boothby (1862–1930, US, C); The World's Drinks And How To Mix Them
- Franz Bopp (1791–1867, Germany, L)
- Eric Borgman (born 1957, Netherlands, R)
- Dmitri Borgmann (1927–1985, US, L)
- Norman Borlaug (1914–2009, US, Ag)
- Max Born (1882–1970, Germany/England, N)
- George Borrow (1803–1881, England, S/R); The Bible in Spain
- Alastair Borthwick (1913–2003, Scotland, Sp/Mi)
- Helen Bosanquet (1860–1926, England, Po/S)
- Käthe Bosse-Griffiths (1910–1998, Germany/Wales, Ar) also in Welsh
- James Boswell (1740–1795, Scotland/England, P/Bg)
- Kenneth E. Boulding (1910–1993, US, Ec/Ph)
- Ana Isabel Boullón Agrelo (born 1962, Spain, L)
- John Bourchier, 2nd Baron Berners (1467–1553, England, H/Mi)
- Pierre Bourdieu (1930–2002, France, Ph/S); Distinction: A Social Critique of the Judgment of Taste
- Anthony Bourdain (1956–2018, US, C); Kitchen Confidential
- Amal Bourquia (born ?, Morocco, Me)
- Jeanne Bouvier (1865–1964, France, F/Po)
- Elizabeth Bowen (1899–1973, Ireland/England, Lc)
- Alexander Bower (fl. 1804–1830, Scotland, Bg)
- Bathsheba Bowers (1671–1718, England, R)
- Jane M. Bowers (1936–2022, US, F/H/Mu)
- Samuel Bownas (1676–1753, England, R)
- Roger Boyle, 1st Earl of Orrery (1621–1679, Ireland/England, Po/Mi)
- Gerald Warner Brace (1901–1978, US, E/T)
- Henry de Bracton (c. 1210 – c. 1268, England, Lw/Po) in Latin
- M. C. Bradbrook (1909–1993, Scotland/England, Lc)
- Michael Braddick (born 1962, England, H)
- Charles Bradlaugh (1833–1891, England, S/R)
- A. C. Bradley (1851–1935, England, Lc)
- William Bragge (1823–1884, England, N/H)
- James Braid (1795–1860, Scotland/England, M/Ps)
- Dionne Brand (born 1953, Canada, S)
- Stewart Brand (born 1938, US, Nh); Whole Earth Discipline
- William Brandon (1914–2002, US, H)
- Anna Brassey (1839–1887, England, T)
- Fernand Braudel (1902–1985, France, H)
- Michael Braungart (born 1958, Germany, B/Nh)
- Alan Bray (1948–2001, England, H/S)
- Anna Eliza Bray (1790–1883, England, T/H)
- François Bréda (1956–2018, Romania/France, Lc) in Hungarian
- Ian Bremmer (born 1969, US, Po)
- Henri Breuil (1877–1961, France, NS/R)
- Cora Belle Brewster (born 1859, date of death unknown, US, Me)
- Henry Briggs (1561–1630, England, Ma), mainly in Latin
- Katharine Mary Briggs (1898–1980, England, Lc/S)
- Eliza Brightwen (1830–1906, Scotland/England, Nh)
- Fidelia Brindis Camacho (1889–1972, Mexico, J)
- Mary A. Brinkman (1846–1932, US, Me)
- Vera Brittain (1893–1970, England, S); Testament of Youth
- Margueritte Harmon Bro (1894–1977, US, R)
- William Broadbent (1835–1907, England, M)
- George Brodie (c. 1786–1867, Scotland, H/Lw)
- Leslie Brody (born 1952, US, J/Bg)
- Denis William Brogan (1900–1974, Scotland/England, Po/H)
- Po Bronson (born 1964, US, J)
- Harold Brookfield (1926–2022, England/Australia, Ag/Nh)
- Cleanth Brooks (1906–1994, US, Lc); The Well Wrought Urn
- Ralph Broome (1742–1805, England, Po)
- Martin Broszat (1926–1989, Germany, H)
- Henry Brougham, 1st Baron Brougham and Vaux (1778–1868, Scotland/England, N/Po)
- Dauvit Broun (born 1961, Scotland, H)
- Anna L. Brown (died 1924, Canada/US, Me)
- Cornelius Brown (1852–1907, England, J/H)
- David Brown (born 1948, England, R)
- Don Brown (born 1960, US, Mi)
- Elizabeth Brown (1830–1899, England, N/Bg)
- Eva Maria Brown (1856–1917, US, Lw/S)
- Hamish Brown (born 1934, Scotland, Sp)
- Helen Gurley Brown (1922–2012, US, J); Sex and the Single Girl
- John Brown (1715–1756, England, Ph/M)
- John Brown (1722–1787, Scotland, R)
- John Brown (1784–1858, Scotland, R)
- John Brown (1810–1882, Scotland, M/P)
- Lester R. Brown (born 1934, US, Nh)
- Marilyn A. Brown (living, US, Nh); Climate Change and Global Energy Security
- Peter Brown (born 1935, Ireland/US, H)
- Peter Hume Brown (1849–1918, Scotland, H)
- Thomas Edward Brown (1830–1897, Isle of Man/England, Ed/R)
- William Wells Brown (c. 1814–1884, US, Po)
- Moses Browne (1704–1787, England, Nh/Sp)
- Simon Browne (1680–1732, England, R)
- Sylvia Browne (1936–2013, US, J)
- Thomas Browne (1605–1682, England, P); Religio Medici
- Henry James Bruce (1880–1951, England, Bg)
- James Bruce (1730–1794, Scotland, T); Travels to Discover the Source of the Nile
- Arthur Moeller van den Bruck (1876–1925, Germany, H/Po); Das Dritte Reich
- Pascal Bruckner (born 1948, France, Ph/S); The Tyranny of Guilt
- Hans Bruyninckx (born 1964, Belgium, Po/Nh)
- Jerome Bruner (1915–2016, US, Ps)
- Emil Brunner (1889–1966, Switzerland, R) in German
- Edwin Bryant (born 1957, US, H/L)
- Jacob Bryant (1715–1804, England, H)
- Robert Bryce (living, US, Nh); Power Hungry
- Patrick Brydone (1736–1818, Scotland, T)
- Bill Bryson (born 1951, US/England, T/J); A Short History of Nearly Everything
- Jan Brzoza (1900–1971, Poland, Po/Lc)
- James Buchan (born 1954, Scotland, H)
- John Buchan (1875–1940, Scotland/England, H/Bg)
- George Buchanan (1506–1582, Scotland, H/Po)
- Mark Buchanan (born 1961, US, N)
- Francis Trevelyan Buckland (1826–1880, England, M/Nh)
- William Buckland (1784–1856, England, R/PArr)
- Richard Buckle (1916–2001, England, J/Ba)
- Guillaume Budé (1467–1540, France, P/R)
- Frederick Buechner (1926–2022, US, R)
- Francis Bugg (1640–1727, England, R)
- Geoffrey Bull (1921–1999, England/Scotland, R)
- J. B. Bullen (living, England, Lc)
- Ismaël Bullialdus (1605–1694, France, N/Ma)
- Ralph Bunche (1904–1971, US, Po)
- John Bunyan (1628–1688, England, R); Grace Abounding to the Chief of Sinners
- Edward Ashdown Bunyard (1878–1939, England, A/G)
- Robert Burchfield (1923–2004, New Zealand/England, L)
- Mary Anne Burges (1763–1813, Scotland, N/Nh)
- Anthony Burgess (1917–1993, England, Lc); Ninety-nine Novels
- Haldane Burgess (1862–1927, Scotland, H/L)
- Richard James Burgess (born 1949, New Zealand/England, Mu/B)
- Robert Forrest Burgess (born 1927, US, J/Sp)
- Verity Burgmann (born 1952, Australia, Po/Ag); Power, Profit and Protest
- Kathleen Burk (born 1946, England, H/J)
- Edmund Burke (1730–1797, England, Po/Ph); Reflections on the Revolution in France
- James Burke (born 1936, Northern Ireland/England, H/N)
- Michael Burke (living, US, J)
- Francis Crawford Burkitt (1864–1935, England, R)
- Michael Burleigh (born 1955, England, H/J)
- Richard Burn (1709–1785, England, Lw)
- Gilbert Burnet (1643–1715, Scotland/England, Ph/H)
- John Burnet (1863–1928, Scotland, H)
- James Burnett, Lord Monboddo (1714–1799, Scotland, L/Ph)
- Charles Burney (1726–1814, England, M)
- Frances Burney (Fanny, 1752–1840, England, Bg)
- James Burney (1750–1821, England, T/H)
- John Burnside (1955–2024, Scotland, J/Nh)
- Edward Burrough (1634–1663, England, R)
- Augusten Burroughs (born 1965, US, J/S); This Is How
- Sara Annie Burstall (1859–1939, Scotland/England, Ed)
- Isabel Burton (1831–1896, England, T/Bg)
- John Hill Burton (1809–1881, Scotland, H/Bg)
- Richard Francis Burton (1821–1890, England/Austria-Hungary, T/L)
- Edwin Arthur Burtt (1892–1889, US, N/R)
- Margaret Busby (born 1944, England, Lc, D)
- Butrus al-Bustani (1819–1883, Lebanon, Po/R) in Arabic
- Jane Butel (living, US, C)
- Nicholas Murray Butler (1862–1947, US, Po)
- Samuel Butler (1613–1680, England Bg)
- Samuel Butler (1774–1839, England, E)
- Samuel Butler (1835–1902, England, R/Bg)
- Smedley Butler (1881–1940, US, Mi)
- Herbert Butterfield (1900–1979, England, H); The Historical Novel
- Charles Buxton (1875–1942, England, Po/T)
- Dorothy Buxton (1881–1963, England, S/Po)
- Fowell Buxton (1786–1845, England, Po/S)
- Caroline Walker Bynum (born 1941, US, H)
- Rhonda Byrne (born 1951, Australia, J)
- Robert Byron (1905–1941, England, T/H); The Road to Oxiana
- Michael Bywater (born 1953, England, J/I)

== C ==
- José Cadalso (1741–1782, Spain, Lc)
- Henry Cadbury (1883–1974, US, R/H)
- Florence Caddy (1837–1923, England, G)
- Andrea Cagan (living, US, Bg)
- Hall Caine (1853–1931, England/Isle of Man, Lc)
- Mona Caird (1854–1932, England/Scotland, F)
- David Cairns (born 1926, England, J/Mu)
- John Cairns (1818–1892, Scotland, R)
- Angus Calder (1942–2008, Scotland, Lc/H)
- Jenni Calder (born 1941, Scotland, Lc)
- Nigel Calder (1931–2014, Scotland/England, N)
- Peter Ritchie Calder (1906–1982, Scotland, J)
- David Calderwood (1575–1650, Scotland, R/H)
- Henry Calderwood (1830–1897, Scotland, R/Ph)
- George Călinescu (1899–1965, Romania, Lc/H)
- Ernest Callenbach (1929–2012, US, D/Nh)
- Carl Gustav Calwer (1821–1874, Germany, Nh)
- William Camden (1551–1623, England, H)
- L. Sprague de Camp (1907–2000, US, P); The Ancient Engineers
- David George Campbell (born 1949, US, Ed/Nh)
- James Campbell (born 1951, Scotland, Bg/J)
- James Dykes Campbell (1838–1895, Scotland/England, Bg/Lc)
- John Campbell (1708–1775, Scotland, H)
- Lewis Campbell (1830–1908, Scotland, Lc)
- Joachim Heinrich Campe (1746–1818, Germany, L/E)
- Albert Camus (1913–1960, Algeria/France, Ph/J); L'Homme révolté
- Jack Canfield (born 1944, US, B)
- Georges Canguilhem (1904–1995, France, Ph/M)
- Thomas Cannon (fl. 1740s–1750s, England, S)
- Andreas Capellanus (fl. 12th c., France, S); De amore
- Flavius Caper (2nd c. AD, Ancient Rome, L)
- John Capgrave (1393–1464, England, H/R) in Latin and Middle English
- Gerolamo Cardano (1501–1576, Italy, Po/Ma) in Latin; Artis magnae, sive de regulis algebraicis
- Richard Carew (1555–1620, England, H)
- Thomas Carlyle (1795–1881, Scotland/England, Ph/H)
- Alexander Carmichael (1832–1912, Scotland, H)
- Roger Caron (1938–2012, Canada, S)
- Harriet Frances Carpenter (1868/75 – 1956, US, Ed)
- Humphrey Carpenter (1946–2005, England, Bg/J)
- Allen Carr (1934–2006, England, M)
- Archie Carr (1909–1987, US, N/Nh)
- Donald Eaton Carr (1903–1986, US, J/Nh)
- E. H. Carr (1892–1982, England, H)
- Jeanne C. Smith Carr (1825–1903, US, H)
- Nicholas G. Carr (born 1959, US, B)
- Raymond Carr (1919–2015, England, H)
- Rachel Carson (1907–1964, US, Nh); The Sea Around Us
- Catherine Carswell (1879–1946, Scotland, Bg/J)
- Elizabeth Carter (1717–1806, England, Lc)
- John Cartwright (1740–1824, England, Po)
- Mark Carwardine (born 1959, England, Nh/T)
- Joyce Cary (1888–1957, Ireland/England, S)
- Isaac Casaubon (1559–1614, France/England, H/L)
- Méric Casaubon (1599–1671, England, R/Ph)
- Cassiodorus (c. AD 485 – c. 585, Italy/Constantinople, Po)
- Públia Hortênsia de Castro (1548–1595, Portugal, P)
- George Catlin (1896–1979, England/US, Po/Ph)
- Cato the Elder (Marcus Porcius Cato, 234–149 BC, Ancient Rome, Po/H)
- Olivia Cattan (born 1967, France, J/F)
- Jean Cavaillès (1903–1944, France, Ph)
- Deborah Cavendish, Duchess of Devonshire (1920–2014, England, H/S)
- George Cavendish (1497 – c. 1562, England, Bg)
- Margaret Cavendish (1623–1673, England, Ph/N)
- Robert Cecil, 1st Viscount Cecil of Chelwood (1864–1958, England, Lw/Po)
- Aulus Cornelius Celsus (c. 25 BC – c. AD 50, Ancient Rome, M)
- Pierre Cérésole (1879–1945, Switzerland, Po/R) in French
- James Chadwick (1891–1974, England, N)
- Dilip Kumar Chakrabarti (born 1941, India/England, H/Ar)
- Alexander Chalmers (1759–1834, Scotland, Lc)
- George Chalmers (1742–1825, Scotland, H/Po)
- Thomas Chalmers (1780–1847, Scotland, R/Ma)
- E. K. Chambers (1866–1954, England, Lc)
- Whittaker Chambers (1901–1961, US, J)
- William Chambers (1723–1796, Sweden/England, A/G)
- Adelbert von Chamisso (1781–1838, Germany, Nh)
- Iris Chang (1968–2004, US, J/H); The Rape of Nanking
- Jung Chang (born 1952, China/England, Bg); Wild Swans
- Frederick William Chapman (1806–1876, US, Bg)
- Yuen Ren Chao (趙元任, 1892–1982, China/US, L/Lc)
- Rose Woodallen Chapman (1875–1923, US, S)
- Hester Chapone (1727–1801, England, F)
- Walter Charleton (1619–1707, England, P)
- Colin Robert Chase (1935–1984, Canada, H)
- Steve Chase (living, US, Lw/Nh)
- François-René de Chateaubriand (1768–1848, France, Po/H)
- Pratap Chatterjee (living, England, Po/Nh)
- Georgiana Chatterton (1806–1876, England, T)
- Beth Chatto (1923–2018, England, G)
- Bruce Chatwin (1940–1989, England, T)
- Sarala Devi Chaudhurani (1872–1945, India, J/F)
- Kirti N. Chaudhuri (born 1934, India/England, H)
- Evelyn Cheesman (1881–1969, England, N/T)
- Sarah Cheevers (1608–1664, England, R/Bg)
- Saveria Chemotti (born 1947, Italy, Lc/S)
- Zhang Chengzhi (born 1948, China, R)
- G. K. Chesterton (1874–1936, England, Ph/R)
- William Rufus Chetwood (died 1766, England, D)
- Alexander Campbell Cheyne (1924–2006, Scotland, H)
- Marjorie Chibnall (1915–2012, England, H)
- Francis James Child (1829–1896, US, E/M)
- Edmund Chilmead (1610–1654, England, P/M)
- Denise Chong (born 1953, Canada, E)
- Peter Chrisp (born 1958, England, H/Ed)
- Lars Lindberg Christensen (born 1970, Denmark, N)
- Ella Christie (Isabella Robertson Christie, 1861–1959, Scotland, T/G)
- Daria Chubata (born 1940, Ukraine, Me)
- Thomas Chubb (1679–1747, England, R)
- Mary Chudleigh (1658–1710, England, R)
- Ward Churchill (1947–2026, US, Po); Struggle for the Land
- Winston Churchill (1874–1965, England, Po/Mi); A History of the English-Speaking Peoples
- Cicero (Marcus Tullius Cicero, 106–46 BC, Ancient Rome, Po/Lw)
- Felicia Buttz Clark (1862–1931, U.S., T)
- William Robinson Clark (1929–2012, Scotland/Canada, R)
- Arthur C. Clarke (1917–2008, England/Sri Lanka, N); The View from Serendip
- John Smith Clarke (1885–1959, Scotland, P)
- Richard A. Clarke (born 1950, US, Mi/Po)
- Francis Clater (1756–1823, England, Ag)
- Brian Cleeve (1921–2003, England, J/R)
- John Clerk of Eldin (1728–1812, Scotland, Mi)
- Augustus Clissold (c. 1797–1882, England, R)
- Maxwell Henry Close (1822–1903, Ireland, R/L)
- J. Storer Clouston (1870–1944, Scotland, H)
- Ken Coates (1930–2010, England, Po)
- Frances Power Cobbe (1822–1904, Ireland/England, S/F)
- William Cobbett (1763–1835, England, Po/T); Rural Rides
- Henry Cockburn, Lord Cockburn (1779–1854, Scotland, Bg)
- James Cockburn (1882–1973, Scotland, R)
- Uli Beutter Cohen (living, Germany/US, J)
- Yolande Cohen (born 1950, Morocco/Canada, H)
- Edward Coke (1552–1634, England, Lw); Institutes of the Lawes of England
- Theo Colborn (1927–2014, US, N/Nh)
- Alice Blanchard Coleman (1858–1936, US, R)
- Melissa Coleman (born 1969, US, Nh)
- Christabel Rose Coleridge (1843–1921, England, J/F)
- Mary Elizabeth Coleridge (1861–1907, England, J)
- Samuel Taylor Coleridge (1772–1834, England, Lc/R)
- Sneed B. Collard III (born 1959, US, P)
- Linda Colley (born 1949, England/US, H); Britons: Forging the Nation 1707–1837
- Jeremy Collier (1650–1726, England, Lc/R)
- Rodney Collin (1909–1956, England, N)
- Anthony Collins (1676–1729, England, Ph/R)
- Robert Colls (born 1949, England, H)
- Estela Beatriz Cols (1965–2010, Argentina, Ed)
- Columella (Lucius Junius Moderatus Columella, AD 4 – c. 70, Ancient Rome, Ag)
- Mary Colvin (1956–2012, US/England, J)
- John Conville (c. 1540–1605, Scotland, Bg/R)
- George Combe (1788–1858, Scotland, M/S); The Constitution of Man
- Anna Manning Comfort (1845–1931, US, Me)
- Philippe de Commines (1447–1511, Burgundy/France, Ph/H)
- Barry Commoner (1917–2012, US, Nh); Making Peace with the Planet
- Peter Conder (1919–1993, England, Nh)
- Cyril Connolly (1903–1974, England, Lc); Enemies of Promise
- Philip Connors (living, US, Nh)
- Peter Conrad (born 1948, Australia/England, Lc)
- Anne Conway (1631–1679, England, Ph)
- Erik M. Conway (born 1965, US, H/T)
- Katherine M. Cook (1876–1962, US, Ed)
- Mordecai Cubitt Cooke (1825–1914, England, Nh)
- Sophie Cooke (born 1976, Scotland, T)
- John Gilbert Cooper (1722–1769, England, Lc)
- John Terence Coppock (1921–2000, Scotland, Ag/I)
- Ann Weiser Cornell (born 1949, US, Ps)
- Joseph Bharat Cornell (living, US, Ed/Nh)
- Julia Corner (1798–1875, England, Ed/H)
- Quintus Cornificius (1st c. BC, Ancient Rome, Po/R)
- Richard Cornuelle (1927–2011, US, Po)
- Dolores Correa Zapata (1853–1924, Mexico, Ed)
- Hugo Brandt Corstius (1935–2014, Netherlands, L); Opperlandse taal- & letterkunde
- Hernán Cortés (1485–1547, Spain/Cuba, H/S)
- Thomas B. Costain (1885–1965, Canada, J)
- Dudley Costello (1803–1865, Ireland/England, T/J)
- Louisa Stuart Costello (1799–1870, England/France, T/H)
- Randle Cotgrave (fl. 17th century, England, L)
- Charles Cotton (1630–1687, England, Sp)
- Angélique du Coudray (c. 1712–1794, France, M)
- G. G. Coulton (1858–1947, England, H)
- Janet E. Courtney (1865–1954, England, Bg/F)
- John William Cousin (1849–1910, Scotland, Lc); A Short Biographical Dictionary of English Literature
- Sean Covey (born 1964, US, B)
- Stephen Covey (1932–2012, US, Ed/B)
- Nicholas Crafts (1949–2023, England, H)
- Sara Jane Crafts (1845–1930, US, Ed/S)
- John Duncan Craig (1830–1909, Ireland, R/L)
- Lura Harris Craighead (1858–1926, US, H/Lw)
- George Lillie Craik (1798–1866, Scotland, Lc/L)
- Nicholas Crane (born 1954, England, T/J)
- Sibylla Bailey Crane (1851–1902, US, H/Mu)
- Mary Rankin Cranston (1873–1931, US, Ag/S)
- Greg Craven (living, US, Nh)
- James Brown Craven (1850–1924, Scotland, R)
- Robert Crawford (born 1959, Scotland, Lc)
- George Crawfurd (1681–1748, Scotland, H)
- John Crawfurd (1783–1868, Scotland/East Indies, L/H)
- David Cressy (living, US, H)
- Francis Albert Eley Crew (1886–1973, England, N/M)
- Isaac Crewdson (1780–1844, England, R)
- Andrew Crichton (1790–1855, Scotland, Bg/H)
- Stephen Crisp (1628–1692, England/Netherlands, R)
- John Wilson Croker (1780–1857, Ireland/England, Mi/Po)
- Herbert Croly (1869–1930, US, Po); The Promise of American Life
- A. J. Cronin (1896–1981, Scotland, M)
- Vincent Cronin (1924–2011, England, Bg/H)
- Sloane Crosley (born 1978, US, J); I Was Told There'd Be Cake
- William Crossing (1847–1928, England, T)
- Aleister Crowley (1875–1947, England, R/Sp); The Book of Thoth
- Paul J. Crutzen (1933–2021, Netherlands, N)
- János Apáczai Csere (1625–1659, Transylvania, L/Ma) in Hungarian
- Sándor Kőrösi Csoma (c. 1784/1788 – 1842, Hungary/India, L/T)
- Sándor Csoóri (1930–2016, Hungary, J/Po)
- Belle Caldwell Culbertson (1857–1934, US, R)
- Heidi Cullen (living, US, Nh)
- Jonathan Culler (born 1944, England, Lc)
- Cormac Cullinan (living, South Africa, Nh/Lw); Wild Law
- Nicholas Culpeper (1616–1654, England, M); The English Physitian
- Alexander Cunningham (1814–1893, England/India, Ar)
- Joseph Davey Cunningham (1812–1851, Scotland/India, H)
- Peter Cunningham (1816–1869, England, T/Bg)
- Edmund Curll (c. 1675–1747, England, Cr/Lc)
- Alice Curwen (c. 1619–1679, England, R)
- John Cutting (born 1952, Scotland/England, Ps)
- Maria Czaplicka (1884–1921, Poland/England, Po/S)
- Maria Czapska (1894–1981, Poland, Bg/H)
- James Clear

== D ==
- Maria Dąbrowska (1889–1965, Poland, S/Lc)
- Anne Dacier (c. 1647–1720, France, Lc/H)
- David Daiches (1912–2005, Scotland/England, Lc)
- David G. Dalin (living, US, R/H)
- David Dalrymple, Lord Hailes (1726–1792, Scotland, Lw/H)
- Sir John Dalrymple, 4th Baronet (1726–1810, Scotland, Lw/H)
- John Dalton (1766–1844, England, N)
- Chris Daly (born 1972, US, S/Po)
- Edward Daly (1933–2016, Ireland, R)
- John Graham Dalyell (1775–1851, Scotland, H/Nh)
- Antonio Damasio (born 1944, Portugal/US, M)
- Richard Henry Dana Jr. (1815–1882, US, Lw/S)
- Liam D'Arcy-Brown (born 1970, England, T)
- Sabine Dardenne (born 1983, Belgium, Bg)
- Tom Dardis (1926–2001, US, J/Bg); Harold Lloyd: The Man on the Clock
- F. J. Harvey Darton (1878–1936, England, H/E)
- Charles Darwin (1809–1882, England, N); On the Origin of Species
- Francis Darwin (1848–1925, England, N)
- George Darwin (1845–1912, England, N)
- John Darwin (born 1948, England, H)
- Leonard Darwin (1850–1943, England, Po/S)
- E. Kyle Datta (living, US, Nh)
- Anni Daulter (living, US, C)
- Elizabeth David (1913–1992, England, C); A Book of Mediterranean Food
- Laurie David (born 1958, US, D/Nh)
- Alexandra David-Néel (1868–1969, Belgium/France, R/T)
- Alan Davidson (1924–2003, England, C); The Oxford Companion to Food
- Hilda Ellis Davidson (1914–2006, England, H/R)
- Osha Gray Davidson (born 1954, US, Nh)
- Thomas Davidson (1840–1900, Scotland/US, Ph)
- Emily Davies (1830–1921, England, F/Po)
- John Davies (c. 1565–1618, England, Ph/R)
- Paul Davies (born 1946, England/US, N/J)
- Carol Anne Davis (born 1961, Scotland, Cr)
- Humphry Davy (1778–1829, England, N)
- Elizabeth Dawbarn (died 1839, England, E/R)
- Richard Dawkins (born 1941, England, N); The Selfish Gene
- José de Acosta (1539 or 1540–1600, Peru/Spain, R/S) in Latin and Spanish
- Guy de la Bédoyère (born 1957, England, H)
- Esther de Berdt (Esther Reid, England/US, 1746–1780, Po)
- Bartolomé de las Casas (c. 1484–1566, Spain, H/S)
- Fray Juan de Torquemada (c. 1562–1624, Mexico, P)
- Kenneth S. Deffeyes (1931–2017, US, N/B)
- Daniel Defoe (1660–1731, England, Po/T); A tour thro' the whole island of Great Britain
- Esther Delisle (born 1954, Canada, H) in French; The Traitor and the Jew
- Christine Delphy (born 1941, France, S/F)
- Claire Démar (1799–1833, France, F/E)
- Thomas Dempster (1579–1625, Scotland/Tuscany, H) in Latin
- Michael Aislabie Denham (post–1800–1859, England, H)
- Daniel Dennett (1942–2024, US, Ph/N)
- John Dennis (1658–1734, England, Lc)
- Richard William George Dennis (1910–2003, England, Nh)
- Michael Denton (born 1943, England/Australia, N); Evolution: A Theory in Crisis
- August Derleth (1909–1971, US, H/Bg); The Milwaukee Road: Its First Hundred Years
- René Descartes (1596–1650, France, Ph/Ma); Passions of the Soul
- Mary Deverell (1731–1805, England, R/F)
- Savitri Devi (1905–1982, France/Greece, Po/Nh); The Impeachment of Man
- Tom Devine (born 1945, Scotland, H)
- Patrick Devlin, Baron Devlin (1905–1992, England, Lw/Ph)
- Bernard DeVoto (1897–1955, US, H/Nh); Across the Wide Missouri
- Henry Dewar (1771–1823, Scotland, P)
- John Dewey (1859–1952, US, Ph/E); Democracy and Education
- William Dewsbury (c. 1621–1688, England, R)
- Anita Diamant (born 1951, US)
- Jared Diamond (born 1937, US); The Third Chimpanzee
- John Diamond (1953–2001, England)
- Cedric Charles Dickens (1916–2006, England)
- Mary Dickens (Maimie, 1838–1896, England, Bg)
- Nate Dickinson (1932–2011, US, Nh)
- Denis Diderot (1713–1784, France, Ph/T); Philosophical Thoughts
- Joan Didion (1934–2021, US, J/S)
- Alice Diehl (1844–1912, England, M/Bg)
- Mark Diesendorf (living, Australia, B/Nh); Greenhouse Solutions with Sustainable Energy
- Kenelm Digby (1603–1665, England, Po); The Closet of the Eminently Learned Sir Kenelme Digbie Kt. Opened
- William Digby (1849–1904, England, P)
- Emilia Dilke (1840–1904, England, H/F)
- Michael Dillon (Lobzang Jivaka, 1915–1962, R/S)
- Jenny Diski (1947–2016, England, S/T)
- Benjamin Disraeli (1804–1881, England, Po/B)
- Isaac D'Israeli (1766–1848, England, Lc/R)
- Edith Ditmas (1896–1986, England, H)
- Lady Florence Dixie (1855–1905, Scotland/England, T/F)
- James Main Dixon (1856–1933, Scotland/US, L/Lc)
- Norman F. Dixon (1922–2013, England, Ps/Af); On the Psychology of Military Incompetence
- William Hepworth Dixon (1821–1879, England, H/T)
- Milovan Djilas (1911–1995, Yugoslavia/Serbia, Po); Conversations with Stalin
- Gábor Döbrentei (1785–1851, Hungary, L/H)
- Susannah Dobson (died 1795, England, Bg/H)
- Catherine Isabella Dodd (1860–1932, England, Ed)
- Madeleine Hope Dodds (1885–1972, England, H)
- Dorcas Dole (fl. later 17th century, England, R)
- Artur Domosławski (born 1967, Poland, J/Po)
- Gordon Donaldson (1913–1993, Scotland, H)
- James Donaldson (1831–1915, Scotland, H/R)
- Stephen Donaldson (1946–1996, England/US/, S)
- John Doran (1807–1878, England, S/H)
- Andrew Dornenburg (born 1958, US, C)
- Francis Douce (1757–1834, England, H)
- Edward Doubleday (1810–1849, England, Nh)
- Henry Doubleday (1808–1875, England, Nh)
- Thomas Doubleday (1790–1870, England, S/E)
- John E. Douglas (living, US, S)
- Marjory Stoneman Douglas (1890–1998, US, Nh/N); The Everglades: River of Grass
- Mary Douglas (1921–2017, England/US, S/R); Purity and Danger
- Mona Douglas (1898–1987, Isle of Man/England, L) in English and Manx
- Sir Robert Douglas, 6th Baronet (1694–1770, Scotland, H)
- Patrick Edward Dove (1815–1873, Scotland, Ec)
- Mary Frances Dowdall (1876–1939, England, F/C)
- Morgan Downey (living, US, B); Oil 101
- Margaret Drabble (born 1939, England, Bg/Lc)
- Gusta Dawidson Draenger (1917–1943, Poland, Po), Holocaust victim
- Geoffrey Drage (1860–1955, England, Po/S)
- Nathan Drake (1766–1836, England, P/M)
- Augusta Theodosia Drane (1823–1894, England, R/Bg)
- John William Draper (1811–1882, US, N/Ph)
- Camille Drevet (1881–1969, France, S)
- K. Eric Drexler (born 1955, US, B/N); Engines of Creation
- Ursula Dronke (1920–2012, England, Lc)
- Peter Drucker (1909–2005, Germany/US, B/S); Concept of the Corporation
- Henry Drummond (1851–1897, Scotland, R)
- Dru Drury (1725–1804, England, N); Illustration of Natural History
- John Dryden (1631–1700, England, Lc); Astraea Redux
- Lucie, Lady Duff-Gordon (1821–1869, England/Egypt, T)
- Charles Duff (1894–1966, Northern Ireland/England, L)
- Eamon Duffy (born 1947, Ireland, H); The Stripping of the Altars
- Maureen Duffy (1933–2026, England, Lc/S)
- Blanche Dugdale (1880–1948, England, Bg)
- John Duignan (1946–2019, Scotland/England, E)
- Cuthbert Dukes (1890–1977, England, M/R)
- Leopold Dukes (1810–1891, Hungary/England, Lc) in German
- Paul Dukes (1934–2021, England/Scotland, H)
- Michael Dummett (1925–2011, England, Ph); Frege: Philosophy of Language
- Henry Dunant (1828–1910, Switzerland, Po/B); A Memory of Solferino
- James Dunbar (1742–1798, Scotland, Ph)
- Andrew Duncan (1744–1828, Scotland, M)
- Archie Duncan (1926–2017, Scotland, H)
- Henry Duncan, (1774–1846, Scotland, R/S)
- Elaine Dundy (1921–2008, US, Bg/J)
- Binnie Dunlop (1874–1946, Scotland, M)
- John Colin Dunlop (1885–1942, Scotland, H)
- J. W. Dunne (1875–1949, England, N/Ph); An Experiment with Time
- John Gregory Dunne (1932–2003, US, Lc)
- John Dunton (1659–1733, England, J/Po)
- Gerina Dunwich (born 1959, US, J/R)
- Diego Durán (c. 1537–1588, Mexico, H)
- Émile Durkheim (1858–1917, France, S); The Rules of Sociological Method
- Gerald Durrell (1925–1995, England/Jersey, Nh); The Overloaded Ark
- Lawrence Durrell (1912–1990, England/France, S); Bitter Lemons
- G. H. Dury (1916–1996, England, N/Nh)
- Anne Dutton (1692–1765, England, R/S)
- Max Dvořák (1874–1921, Austria-Hungary/Czechoslovakia, H/Fi)
- Wilma Dykeman (1920–2006, US, T/Bg)
- A. E. Dyson (1928–2002, England, Lc/Ed)

== E ==
- Eadmer (c. 1060 – c. 1126, England, H/R)
- Elizabeth Eames (1918–2008, England, Ar/H)
- Edward Eastwick (1814–1883, England, T)
- Shirin Ebadi (born 1947, Iran, Po)
- Curtis Ebbesmeyer (born 1943, US, N/Nh)
- Martin Ebon (1917–2006, US, P)
- Laurence Echard (c. 1670–1730, England, H)
- Elaine Howard Ecklund (living, US, S)
- Mary Baker Eddy (1821–1910, US, R/M); Science and Health with Key to the Scriptures
- Richard Eden (c. 1520–1576, England, T); Decades of the New World
- Robert William Edis (1839–1927, England, Aa)
- Arthur Edmondston (1776–1841, Scotland, M/T)
- John Edward (born 1969, US, J/R)
- Amelia Edwards (1831–1892, England, T)
- Timothy Egan (born 1954, US, J); The Worst Hard Time
- Dave Eggers (born 1970, US, J/S); A Heartbreaking Work of Staggering Genius
- John Ehle (1925–2018, US, Bg/Po)
- Anne H. Ehrlich (born 1933, US, N/Nh)
- Paul R. Ehrlich (1932–2026, US, N)
- Barbara Ehrenreich (1941–2022, US, J/S); Nickel and Dimed
- Albert Einstein (1879–1955, Germany/US, M/N)
- Elizabeth Eisenstein (1923–2016, US, H)
- John Elder (fl. 1542–1565, Scotland, S)
- Norbert Elias (1897–1990, Germany/England, S)
- T. S. Eliot (1888–1965, US/England, Lc); Tradition and the Individual Talent
- Alice Thomas Ellis (Ann Margaret Lindholm, 1932–2005, Wales/England, C/R)
- Edith Ellis (1861–1916, England, F/Bg)
- George F. R. Ellis (born 1939, South Africa, N); The Large Scale Structure of Space-Time (co-author)
- Havelock Ellis (1859–1939, England, M/Ps)
- Margaret Dye Ellis (1845–1925, US, S)
- Sarah Stickney Ellis (1799–1872, England, Ed/S)
- William Ellis (1794–1872, England/Madagascar, R/T)
- William Charles Ellis (1780–1839, England, M/S)
- Thomas Ellwood (1639–1714, England, R)
- Mountstuart Elphinstone (1779–1859, Scotland/India, H)
- Koenraad Elst (born 1959, Belgium, R/Po)
- Elizabeth Elstob (1683–1756, England, L/F)
- Charles Sutherland Elton (1900–1991, England, N)
- Anne Elwood (1796–1873, England/India, T/Bg)
- Buchi Emecheta (1944–2017, Nigeria/England, S/Bg)
- Ralph Waldo Emerson (1803–1882, US, Ph/S); The Conduct of Life
- William Empson (1906–1984, England, Lc); Seven Types of Ambiguity
- Gérard Encausse (also as Papus, 1865–1916, France, M/R)
- Friedrich Engels (1820–1895, Germany/England, Po/S); The Condition of the Working Class in England
- Jeremy England (born 1982, US, NS/R)
- Samuel Ifor Enoch (1914–2001, Welsh, R)
- József Eötvös (1813–1871, Hungary, Po/S)
- Epictetus (c. AD 50–135, Ancient Rome, Ph) in Greek and Latin
- Edward Jay Epstein (1935–2024, US, J/S)
- Erasmus of Rotterdam (1466–1536, Netherlands/England, Ph/R); The Praise of Folly
- Filip Erceg (born 1979, Yugoslavia/Croatia, J/Po)
- David Erskine (1772–1837, Scotland, T)
- Ebenezer Erskine (1680–1754, Scotland, R)
- Ralph Erskine (1685–1752, Scotland, R)
- Auguste Escoffier (1846–1935, France/England, C); Le Guide Culinaire
- Edith Escombe (1866–1950, England, Ed)
- Ana Estrella Santos (born 20th-c., Ecuador, L)
- Daniel C. Esty (born 1959, US, B/Nh)
- Jun Eto (江藤 淳, 1932–1999, Japan, Lc)
- Euclid (fl. 300 BC, Alexandria, M); Euclid's Elements
- Eugenia (pseudonym, fl. early 18th c., England, R/F)
- John Evans (1823–1908, England, Ar)
- Katherine Evans and Sarah Cheevers (1618–1692 and 1608–1664, England, R/Cr)
- Peter Evans (1929–2018, England, Mu)
- Katherine Evans (1618–1692, England, R)
- Warren Felt Evans (1817–1889, US, R/M)
- John Evelyn (1620–1706, England, Po/G); Sylva, or A Discourse of Forest-Trees and the Propagation of Timber
- Julius Evola (1898–1974, Italy, Po/Ph)
- Leonora Eyles (1889–1960, England, F)

== F ==
- Kinga Fabó (1953–2021, Hungary, L/S)
- Chuck Fager (born 1942, US, Po)
- Dan Fagin (born 1963, US, J/Nh); Toms River: A Story of Science and Salvation
- William Fairbairn (1789–1874, Scotland/England, N)
- Thomas Fairchild (c. 1667–1729, England, G)
- Frederick William Fairholt (1814–1866, England, H)
- J. Meade Falkner (1858–1932, England, T)
- Clara Elizabeth Fanning (1878–1938, US, Po)
- Frantz Fanon (1925–1961, Martinique/Algeria, Po/S); A Dying Colonialism
- Ann, Lady Fanshawe (1625–1680, England, S/Po)
- Michael Faraday (1791–1867, England, N)
- Anthony Faramus (1920–1990, Jersey/US, H/Po)
- Paul Lawrence Farber (1944–2021, US, H/N)
- John Farey Sr. (1766–1826, England, P)
- Gyula Farkas (1847–1930, Hungary, N) in German and Hungarian
- Gyula Farkas (1894–1958, Hungary/Germany, L) in German and Hungarian
- Richard Farmer (1735–1797, England, Lc)
- Florence Farr (1860–1917, England, R/D)
- Frederic Farrar (1831–1903, England, R)
- Eliza Fay (1755 or 1756–1816, England/India, T/S)
- Sidney Bradshaw Fay (1876–1967, US, H)
- Jane Fearon (1654 or 1656–1737, England, R)
- Wayne Federman (born 1959, US, J/Mu); Maravich
- Bruce Feirstein (born 1953, US, J/S); Real Men Don't Eat Quiche
- Mary Fels (1863–1953, US, Bg/R)
- Margaret Fell (1614–1702, England, R)
- Owen Feltham (1602–1668, England, P)
- Desmond Fennell (1929–2021, Ireland, S/P)
- Adam Ferguson (1723–1816, Scotland, R/H); Essay on the History of Civil Society
- David Ferguson (died 1598, Scotland, R)
- Niall Ferguson (born 1964, Scotland/England, H)
- Pierre de Fermat (1607–1665, France, Lw/Ma)
- Patrick Leigh Fermor (1915–2011, England/Greece, T); A Time of Gifts
- Fanny Fern (1811–1872, US, J)
- Chitra Fernando (1935–1998, Sri Lanka, L)
- Eric Fernie (born 1939, Scotland, Fi)
- James Frederick Ferrier (1808–1864, Scotland, Ph)
- Timothy Ferris (born 1944, US, N); The Whole Shebang: A State-of-the-Universe(s) Report
- Ludwig Feuerbach (1804–1872, Germany, R); The Essence of Christianity
- Johann Gottlieb Fichte (1762–1814, Germany, Ph); The Vocation of Man
- Mrs. E. M. Field (1856–1940, Ireland/England, Lc/Ed)
- William Field (1768–1851, England, R)
- Celia Fiennes (1662–1741, England, T)
- David Fig (living, South Africa, B/Po)
- Orlando Figes (born 1959, England, H); A People's Tragedy
- Robert Filmer (c. 1588–1653, England, Po); Patriarcha
- Timothy Findley (1930–2002, Canada, Lc/T)
- George Finlay (1799–1875, Scotland, H)
- Daniel Finkelstein (born 1962, England, Bg/H); Hitler, Stalin, Mum and Dad
- Iain Finlayson (born 1945, Scotland, Bg/T)
- Anténor Firmin (1850–1911, Haiti, N/J)
- Arthur Firstenberg (1950–2025, US, N/M)
- Fritz Fischer (1908–1999, Germany, H); War of Illusions
- Kuno Fischer (1824–1907, Germany, Ph)
- Margery Fish (1892–1969, England, G)
- Timothy Fish (living, US, I)
- Ann Fisher (England, 1719–1778, L)
- Verrius Flaccus (c. 55 BC – AD 20, Ancient Rome, L); De Verborum Significatione
- Tim Flannery (born 1956, Australia, Nh); The Weather Makers
- Christopher Flavin (living, US, Nh)
- Aloys Fleischmann (1910–1992, Ireland, Mu)
- Tilly Fleischmann (1882–1967, Ireland, Mu)
- Abraham Fleming (c. 1552–1607, England, R/H)
- Alexander Fleming (1881–1955, Scotland, N/M)
- David Fleming (1940–2010, England, Nh)
- David Hay Fleming (1849–1931, Scotland, H)
- John Fleming (1785–1857, Scotland, Nh/R)
- John Ambrose Fleming (1849–1945, England, N)
- Andrew Fletcher (1655–1716, Scotland, Po)
- John William Fletcher (1729–1785, England, R)
- Joseph Fletcher (1905–1991, US, S)
- Maria De Fleury (fl. 1773–1791, England, R)
- Antony Flew (1922–2010, England, Ph)
- Robert Newton Flew (1886–1962, England, R)
- Florence of Worcester (died 1118, England, H); Chronicon ex chronicis
- Richard Florida (born 1957, US, S/B); Who's Your City?
- John Florio (1553–1625, England, L)
- Alice Flowerdew (1759–1830), England, R)
- Robert Fludd (1574–1637, England, N/Ph)
- János Fogarasi (1801–1878, Hungary, Lw/L)
- William Perry Fogg (1826–1909, US, Bg/T)
- Sara Rowsey Foley (1840-1925, US, Bg)
- Benjamin Fondane (Benjamin Fundoianu, 1898–1944, Romania/France, Lc/Ph); in Romanian and French
- Élisabeth de Fontenay (born 1934, France, Ph)
- Bernard Le Bovier de Fontenelle (1657–1757, France, N/S); Conversations on the Plurality of Worlds
- Dingle Foot (1905–1978, England, Po)
- M. R. D. Foot (1919–2012, England, H/Cr)
- Michael Foot (1913–2010, England, Po); Guilty Men (co-author)
- Paul Foot (1937–2004, England, J)
- Philippa Foot (1920–2010, England, Ph)
- Sarah Foot (born 1961, England, H)
- Edward Forbes (1815–1854, Isle of Man/England, Nh/T)
- Isabella Ford (1855–1924, England, Po/F)
- David Foreman (1946–2022, US, Nh); Ecodefense
- Veronica Forrest-Thomson (1947–1975, Scotland/England, Lc)
- Jeff Forshaw (born 1968, England, N); Why Does E=mc²?
- E. M. Forster (1879–1970, England, Lc); Two Cheers for Democracy
- Mary Forster (c. 1620–1687, England, R/S)
- William Forster (fl. 1632–1673, England, Ma)
- Neil Forsyth (born 1978, Scotland, J/Bg)
- John Fortescue (c. 1394–1479, England, Lw)
- Richard Fortey (1946–2025, England, Ar/Nh); Life: A Natural History of the First Four Billion Years of Life on Earth
- Dion Fortune (1890–1946, England, R)
- Charles Foster (1923–2017, Canada, J)
- John Bellamy Foster (born 1953, US, S/E); Critique of Intelligent Design
- Richard Foster (born 1942, US, R/S)
- R. F. Foster (born 1949, Ireland/England, H)
- John Fothergill (1712–1780, England, M/Nh)
- Michel Foucault (1926–1984, France, Ph/S); The Archaeology of Knowledge
- Margaret Fountaine (1862–1940, England, Nh)
- Henry Watson Fowler (1858–1933, England, L); A Dictionary of Modern English Usage
- W. W. Fowler (1849–1923, England, L)
- John Fowles (1926–2005, England, H); The Tree
- Aileen Fox (1907–2005, England, Ar)
- Caroline Fox (1819–1871, England, Bg)
- Mem Fox (born 1946, Australia, E); Possum Magic
- Robert Were Fox the Younger (1789–1877, England, N)
- John Foxe (1516/17–1587, England, R/H); Actes and Monuments
- Gavin Francis (born 1975, Scotland, M/T)
- Louise E. Francis (1869–1932, US, Ed/F)
- Antoine François, comte de Fourcroy (1755–1809, France, N)
- Anne Frank (1929–1945, Netherlands, Bg/H); The Diary of a Young Girl
- Charis Frankenburg (1892–1985, England, Ed/Ps)
- Ursula Franklin (1921–2016, Germany/Canada, N/F)
- Antonia Fraser (born 1932, England, Bg/H); Mary, Queen of Scots
- Flora Fraser (born 1958, England, Bg/H)
- James Baillie Fraser (1783–1856, Scotland, T)
- William Fraser (1816–1898, Scotland, H/Pr)
- James George Frazer (1854–1941, Scotland, R); The Golden Bough
- Ian Frazier (born 1951, US, T)
- Charles Freeman (born 1947, England, H)
- Edward Augustus Freeman (1823–1892, England, H/Po); The History of the Norman Conquest of England
- Hilary French (living, US, Po/Nh)
- Sigmund Freud (1856–1939, Austria/England, Ps); Totem and Taboo
- Gustav Freytag (1816–1895, Germany, H)
- Alfred Hermann Fried (1864–1921, Austria, Po/J)
- Leonie Frieda (born 1956, Sweden/England, Bg)
- Joseph Friedenson (1922–2013, Poland/US, H/Po)
- Milton Friedman (1912–2006, US, E/Po); Capitalism and Freedom
- Thomas Friedman (born 1953, US, J/Nh); Hot, Flat, and Crowded
- Howard Friel (living, US, Lw/S)
- Chris Frith (born 1942, England, Ps)
- Uta Frith (born 1941, Germany/England, Ps/Ed)
- Friedrich Fröbel (1782–1952, Germany, Ed)
- Frontinus (Sextus Julius Frontinus, c. AD 40–103, Ancient Rome, N/Po)
- Elizabeth Fry (1780–1845, England, S/Cr)
- Joan Mary Fry (1862–1955, England, S/R)
- Agnes Moore Fryberger (1868–1939, US, Ed/Mu)
- Sadakazu Fujii (藤井貞和, born 1942, Japan, Lc/L)
- Fujiwara no Teika (藤原定家, 1162–1241, Japan, P)
- Hideko Fukuda (福田英子, 1865–1927, Japan, Ed/F)
- Sadayoshi Fukuda (福田定良, 1917–2002, Japan, Ph/Lc)
- Sakiko Fukuda-Parr (サキコ・フクダ・パー、福田咲子, born 1950, Japan, Ec); The Gene Revolution: GM Crops and Unequal Development
- Yukichi Fukuzawa (福澤諭吉, 1835–1901, Japan, Ed/L)
- Masanobu Fukuoka (福岡正信, 1913–2008, Japan, Ag/Ph)
- Buckminster Fuller (1895–1983, US, A/N)
- Thomas Fuller (1608–1661, England, R)
- Shimei Futabatei (二葉亭四迷, 1864–1909, Japan, Lc)
- Christopher Fyfe (1920–2008, Scotland, H)

== G ==
- Gaszton Gaál (1868–1932, Hungary, Nh/Po)
- Medard Gabel (living, US, E/Nh)
- Thomas E. Gaddis (1908–1984, US, Bg)
- Geoffrey Gaimar (fl. 1130s, Anglo-Normandy, H)
- James Gairdner (1828–1912, Scotland/England, H); The Paston Letters
- Vivian Hunter Galbraith (1889–1976, England, H)
- Eduardo Galeano (1940–2015, Uruguay, Sp/Po)
- Galileo Galilei (1564–1642, Italy, P); The Assayer
- John Galt (1779–1839, Scotland, Po/S)
- Joana da Gama (c. 1520–1586, Portugal, R)
- George Gamow (1904–1968, Russia/US, N) in Russian and English, One Two Three... Infinity
- Mahatma Gandhi (1869–1948, India, Po) in Gujarati, The Story of My Experiments with Truth
- Ernest K. Gann (1910–1991, US, Sp/Nh); Fate Is the Hunter
- Delphine Gardey (born 1967, France, F/S/H)
- Alan Gardiner (1879–1963, England, H); Gardiner's sign list
- Juliet Gardiner (born 1943, England, J/H)
- Gerald Gardner (1884–1964, Ceylon/England, R/Ar)
- Helen Louise Gardner (1908–1996, England, Lc)
- Dorothy Garrod (1892–1968, England, Ar)
- Leopolda Gassó y Vidal (1849–1885, Spain, F)
- Henry Louis Gates Jr. (born 1950, US, Lc/H)
- Vic Gatrell (born 1941, South Africa/England, H/Cr)
- Margaret Gatty (1809–1873, England, N)
- Diarmuid Gavin (born 1964, Ireland/England, G)
- Sarah Ann Haynsworth Gayle (1804–1835, United States, Bg)
- Leymah Gbowee (born 1972, Liberia, Po/F)
- Antoine Court de Gébelin (1725–1784, France, R/Sp)
- Alexander Geddes (1737–1802, Scotland, R)
- Michael Geddes (c. 1650–1713, Scotland/England, R)
- Arnold Gehlen (1904–1976, Germany, Ph/S)
- Ross Gelbspan (1939–2024, US, Nh)
- Margaret Gelling (1924–200 9, England, L)
- Aulus Gellius (AD 125 – post-180, Ancient Rome, L/P)
- Benjamin Genocchio (born 1969, Australia/US, Fi)
- Geoffrey of Monmouth (c. 1095/1100 – c. 1155, Wales/England, R/H) in Latin; Itinerarium Cambriae
- Ella M. George (1850–1938, US, F/S)
- Henry George (1839–1897, US, Po/J)
- Gerald of Wales (c. 1146 – c. 1223, Wales/England, R/H)
- Antonine de Gérando (1844-1914, France/Hungary, Ed)
- Alexander Gerard (1728–1795, Scotland, R/Ph)
- John Gerard (c. 1545–1612, England, Nh)
- Victor Wallace Germains (1888 – post-1954, England, Af/So)
- Raymond Geuss (born 1946, US/England, Ph); Philosophy and Real Politics
- Edward Gibbon (1737–1794, England, H); The History of the Decline and Fall of the Roman Empire
- Edmund Gibson (1669–1748, England, R/H)
- Martin Gilbert (1936–2015, England, H)
- William Gilbert (1544–1603, England, N) in Latin
- Anthony Gilby (c. 1510–1585, R)
- Roberta Gilchrist (born 1965, England, H)
- Peter Giles (1860–1935, Scotland/England, L)
- David Gill (1843–1914, Scotland, N)
- John Gillies (1747–1836, Scotland, H)
- Carol Gilligan (born 1936, US, F/Ps); In a Different Voice
- George Gilfillan (1813–1878, Scotland, Lc/R)
- Priscilla Gilman (born 1970, United States)
- Concepción Gimeno de Flaquer (1850–1919, Spain, S)
- Herbert Girardet (born 1943, Germany, S/Nh); Surviving the Century
- Abelard Giza (born 1980, Poland, Me)
- Malcolm Gladwell (born 1963, Canada, J)
- William Nugent Glascock (c. 1787–1847, Ireland/England, Af)
- Marcelo Gleiser (born 1959, Brazil, NS)
- Duncan Glen (1933–2008, Scotland/England, Lc)
- Misha Glenny (born 1958, England, J)
- Henry H. Goddard (1866–1957, US, Ps)
- Frederick DuCane Godman (1834–1919, England/Mexico, Nh)
- Sita Ram Goel (1921–2003, India, R/Po)
- Magdalen Goffin (1925–2015, England, Bg/R)
- Erving Goffman (1922–1982, Canada/US, S); The Presentation of Self in Everyday Life
- Jyoti Gogte (born 1956, India, E)
- Emma Goldman (1869–1940, Russian Empire/US, Po/Ph); My Disillusionment in Russia
- Oliver Goldsmith (1728–1774, Ireland/England, T/H)
- Daniel Goleman (born 1946, US, J/N)
- Israel Gollancz (1863–1930, England, Lc)
- Victor Gollancz (1893–1967, England, Po); A Year of Grace
- Zoltán Gombocz (1877–1935, Hungary, L)
- Ernst Gombrich (1909–2001, Austria/England, Fi); The Story of Art
- Ana Marta González (born 1969, Spain, Ph)
- Juan González (born 1947, US, B/Po)
- Chris Goodall (born 1955, England, B/Nh); Ten Technologies to Fix Energy and Climate
- Jeff Goodell (living, US, J/Nh)
- David Goodstein (1939–2024, US, N/Nh); Out of Gas: The End of the Age of Oil
- Doris Kearns Goodwin (born 1943, US, Bg/H)
- Alexander Gordon (c. 1692–1755, Scotland/South Carolina, H)
- Alexander Gordon (1841–1931, Scotland/England, H/Bg)
- Robert Gordon (1786–1853, Scotland, P/R)
- Robert Gordon of Straloch (1580–1661, Scotland, Ma/H)
- Thomas Gordon (c. 1691–1750, Scotland/England, Po)
- Al Gore (born 1948, US, Po/Nh); An Inconvenient Truth
- Ben Goto (五島 勉, 1929–2020, Japan, J)
- Olympe de Gouges (1748–1793, France, F/Po)
- Stephen Jay Gould (1941–2002, US, Ar/N)
- Marie de Gournay (1565–1645, France, P)
- Lawrence Gowing (1918–1991, England, Fi/E)
- W. G. Grace (1848–1915, England, Sp)
- Baltasar Gracián (1601–1658, Spain, P)
- Cunninghame Graham (1852–1936, Scotland, J/Po)
- Maria Graham (1785–1842, England, T)
- Stephen Graham (1884–1975, England/Russia, Po/T)
- Virginia Graham (1910–1993, England, S/Lc); Say Please
- James Grant (1822–1887, Scotland, H)
- Olga Grau (born 1945, Chile, ED/F/L/Ph)
- Robert Graves (1895–1985, England, H/Lc); I, Claudius
- Alasdair Gray (1934–2019, Scotland, P)
- Alexander Gray (1882–1968, Scotland, Ec/Po)
- Charlotte Gray (born 1948, Canada, H/Bg)
- Charlotte E. Gray (1873–1926, US, R)
- Elizabeth Caroline Gray (1800–1887, Scotland/England, T/Ar)
- Jane Loring Gray (1821–1909, United States, Bg)
- John Gray (born 1948, England, Ph/Po); False Dawn: The Delusions of Global Capitalism
- John Gray (born 1951, US, S), Men Are from Mars, Women Are from Venus
- Muriel Gray (born 1958, Scotland, J)
- Patience Gray (1917–2005, England, C/S)
- Abigail Green (living, England, H)
- Thomas Hill Green (1836–1882, England, Ph/Po)
- Cordelia A. Greene (1831–1905, US, Me)
- Graham Greene (1904–1991, England, Lc); Journey Without Maps
- Robert Greene (1558–1592, England, Lc); Greene's Groats-Worth of Wit
- James Greenwood (1832–1929, England, S)
- Walter Gregor (1825–1897, Scotland, S)
- David Gregory (1661–1708, Scotland, Ma/N)
- Dick Gregory (1932–2017, US, Po/Sp)
- Donald Gregory (1803–1836, Scotland, H)
- James Gregory (1638–1675, Scotland, M/N)
- James Gregory (1753–1821, Scotland, M/H)
- John Gregory (1724–1773, Scotland, M/S); A Father's Legacy to his Daughters
- William Gregory (1803–1858, Scotland, N)
- Andrew Greig (born 1951, Scotland, Sp)
- Taras Grescoe (living, Canada, T/G); Sacré Blues
- William Gresley (1801–1876, England, R)
- Alec Greven (born c. 2000, US, S)
- Anthony Grey (born 1938, England, J); Hostage in Peking
- Aubrey de Grey (born 1963, England, M/Ma)
- Jacob Grimm (1785–1863, Germany, L/H); Deutsche Mythologie
- Francis Grose (1731–1791, England, H/L)
- Robert Grosseteste (c. 1175–1253, England, N) in Latin
- George Grote (1794–1871, England, H/Po)
- Harriet Grote (1792–1878, England, Bg)
- Edward Grubb (1854–1939, England, R)
- Bertha Jane Grundy (1837–1912, England, F/C)
- Serge Gruzinski (born 1949, France, H)
- Guibert of Nogent (c. 1055–1124, France, H/R)
- Francesco Guicciardini (1483–1540, Italy, H/Lw)
- Arthur Guirdham (1905–1992, England, M/R)
- Nataliya Gumenyuk (born 1983, Ukraine, J)
- Neil M. Gunn (1891–1973, Scotland, T)
- Asriel Günzig (1868–1931, R)
- William Gurnall (1616–1679, England, R/Po)
- Joseph John Gurney (1788–1847, England, S/Cr)
- Alan Guth (born 1947, US, N); The Inflationary Universe
- Henry Guthrie (c. 1600–1676, Scotland, S)
- William Guthrie (1708–1770, Scotland, H)
- William Gwavas (1676–1742/2, England/Cornwall, L)
- Sámuel Gyarmathi (1751–1830, Transylvania, Hungary, L)

== H ==
- Jürgen Habermas (born 1929, Germany, S/Ph); The Structural Transformation of the Public Sphere
- Maria Hack (1777–1844, England, Ed/R)
- Ernst Haeckel (1834–1919, Germany, Nh/Ph)
- Toni Hagen (1917–2003, Switzerland, N/E)
- Nicky Hager (born 1958, New Zealand, J/Nh); Seeds of Distrust
- Elisabeth Haich (1897–1994, Hungary/Switzerland, R)
- Dan Haifley (living, US, J/Nh)
- Julia Hailes (born 1961, England, Nh); The New Green Consumer Guide
- István Hajnal (1892–1956, Hungary, H/Ar)
- Arai Hakuseki (新井白石, 1657–1725, Japan, R/Po)
- David Halberstam (1934–2007, US. J/H); The Fifties
- Maurice Halbwachs (1877–1945, France, Ph/S)
- J. B. S. Haldane (1892–1964, England/India, N/Ma); Daedalus; or, Science and the Future
- Élie Halévy (1870–1937, France, Ph/H)
- Benjamin Hall, 1st Baron Llanover (1802–1867, England/Wales, P)
- Joseph Hall (1574–1656, England, P)
- Henry Hallam (1777–1859, England, H/Lc)
- Edmond Halley (1656–1742, England, N/Ma)
- Ian Halperin (born 1964, Canada, J); Hollywood Undercover
- John D. Hamaker (1914–1994, US, N/Nh)
- Clive Hamilton (born 1953, Australia, Nh); Requiem for a Species
- Edith Hamilton (1867–1963, US, Ed/H); Mythology
- Ian Hamilton (1938–2001, England, Lc/Bg)
- Edward Bruce Hamley (1824–1893, England, Af)
- Kiyoteru Hanada (花田清輝, 1909–1974, Japan, Lc/Po)
- Nahema Hanafi (born 1983, France, H)
- Terri Crawford Hansen (born 1953, US, Nh)
- Tamiki Hara (原民喜, 1905–1951, Japan, J/N)
- Garrett Hardin (1915–2003, US, N/Nh)
- G. H. Hardy (1877–1947, England, Ma); A Mathematician's Apology
- Margaret Harkness (1854–1923, England, H/S)
- Jonathan Harr (living, US, J); A Civil Action
- Heinrich Harrer (1912–2006, Austria, Sp/Nh); Seven Years in Tibet
- James Harrington (1611–1677, England, Po); The Commonwealth of Oceana
- John Harriott (1745–1817, England, Af/S)
- Ada Van Stone Harris (1866–1923, US, Ed)
- Frank Harris (1855–1931, US/England, J)
- James Harris (1709–1780, England, Po/L)
- Sam Harris (born 1967, US, Ph/R); The End of Faith
- Barbara Grizzuti Harrison (1934–2002, US, J/T)
- Jonathan Baxter Harrison (1835–1907, US, J/R)
- Ruth Harrison (1920–2000, England, Ag/S)
- H. L. A. Hart (1907–1992, England, Lw/Ph); The Concept of Law
- Horace Hart (1840–1916, England, L); Hart's Rules for Compositors and Readers
- Robert Hart (1913–2000, England, G/Nh)
- Jan de Hartog (1914–2002, Netherlands/US, S)
- Marcus Hartog (1851–1924, England/Ireland, Nh)
- Edmund Harvey (1875–1955, England, R/Po)
- William Henry Harvey (1811–1866, Ireland, Nh)
- Rizwana Hasan (born 1968, Bangladesh, Lw/Nh)
- Gregory Hascard (died 1708, England, R)
- Nyozekan Hasegawa (長谷川如是閑, 1875–1969, Japan, S/J)
- Shinkichi Hashimoto (橋本進吉, 1882–1945, Japan, L)
- Rosemary Haughton (1927–2024, England/US, R)
- Paul Hawken (born 1946, US, B/Nh); Blessed Unrest
- Jacquetta Hawkes (1910–1996, England, Ar)
- John Hawkesworth (c. 1715–1773, England, J/R)
- Stephen Hawking (1942–2018, England, Nh); A Brief History of Time
- Edward Hawkins (1780–1867, England, H)
- Edward Hawkins (1789–1882, England, R)
- John Hawkins (1719–1789, England, Mu/Bg)
- Thomas Hawkins (1729–1772, England, Lc)
- Elizabeth Hawley (1923–2018, US/Nepal, J/T)
- Elizabeth Hay (born 1951, Canada, T); The Only Snow in Havana
- Louise Hay (1926–2017, US, Ps/M); You Can Heal Your Life.
- Friedrich Hayek (1899–1992, Austria/England, E/Ph); The Road to Serfdom
- Gerard Anthony Hayes-McCoy (1911–1975, Ireland, H)
- Abraham Hayward (1801–1884, England, Po/C)
- William Hazlitt (1778–1830, England, Lc/Ph); Table-Talk
- Wilson A. Head (1914–1993, US/Canada, S/Po)
- Lafcadio Hearn (Koizumi Yakumo, 小泉八雲, 1850–1904, England/Japan, T/H)
- Georg Wilhelm Friedrich Hegel (1770–1831, Germany, Ph); Encyclopedia of the Philosophical Sciences
- Martin Heidegger (1889–1976, Germany, Ph); Being and Time
- Richard Heinberg (born 1950, US, J/Nh); The Party's Over: Oil, War, and the Fate of Industrial Societies
- Daniel Heinsius (1580–1655, Netherlands, P) in Latin
- Nicolaas Heinsius the Elder (1620–1681, Netherlands, Lc/H)
- Meshullam Feivush Heller (c. 1742–1794, Galicia and Lodomeria, R) in Hebrew
- Dieter Helm (born 1956, England, Ec/Nh)
- Helmold (c. 1120 – post-1177, Germany, H) in Latin
- Ernest Hemingway (1899–1961, US, J); A Moveable Feast
- Eugénie Henderson (1914–1989, England, L)
- Lawrence Joseph Henderson (1878–1942, US, Nh)
- John Henley (1692–1756, England, L)
- Henry of Huntingdon (c. 1088 – c. 1157, England, H/M)
- Mark D. Herber (living, England, H)
- Edward Herbert, 1st Baron Herbert (1582–1648, England, H/R) in Latin
- Leila Herbert (1868–1897, United States, H)
- Thomas Herbert (1606–1682, England, T/Po)
- Johann Gottfried Herder (1744–1803, Germany, Ph/Lc)
- Jenny d'Héricourt (1809–1875, France, M/F)
- Ottó Herman (1835–1914, Hungary, Nh/P)
- Herodotus (5th century BC, Ancient Greece, H); Histories
- Caroline Herschel (1750–1848, Germany/England, N)
- John Herschel (1792–1871, England, P)
- William Herschel (1738–1822, Germany/England, N)
- James Hervey (1714–1758, England, R)
- Louise Hervieu (1878–1954, France, Aa)
- Alexander Herzen (1812–1870, Russia, Po/S)
- Theodor Herzl (1860–1904, Austria-Hungary, J/Po); Der Judenstaat
- Sheila Heti (born 1976, Canada, S/Lc)
- John Hey (1734–1815, England, R)
- Richard Hey (1745–1835, England, P)
- William Hey (1736–1819, England, M)
- Christopher Heydon (1561–1623, England, R)
- John Heydon (1629 – post-1670, England, R)
- Thor Heyerdahl (1914–2002, Norway, T/H); The Kon-Tiki Expedition
- Elias Hicks (1748–1830, New York/US, R)
- Godfrey Higgins (1772–1833, England, S/H); Anacalypsis
- Declan Hill (living, Canada, Cr/Sp)
- Julia Butterfly Hill (born 1974, US, Nh); The Legacy of Luna
- Napoleon Hill (1883–1970, US, J); Think and Grow Rich
- Octavia Hill (1838–1912, England, S/Nh)
- Thomas Hill (born c. 1528, England, G); The Gardener's Labyrinth
- Richard Hillary (1919–1943, Australia/England, Bg); The Last Enemy
- Laura Hillenbrand (born 1967, US, J/Af); Unbroken: A World War II Story of Survival, Resilience, and Redemption
- Walter Hilton (c. 1340–1345 – 1396, England, R) in Latin and English
- Kazuo Hirotsu (広津和郎, 1891–1968, Japan, Lc)
- E. D. Hirsch (born 1928, US, E/Lc)
- Albert O. Hirschman (1915–2012, Germany/US, E/Po)
- Christopher Hitchens (1949–2011, England/US, J/Lc); Imperial Spoils: The Curious Case of the Elgin Marbles
- Louis Hjelmslev (1899–1965, Denmark, L)
- Huang Qing Zhigong Tu (皇清職貢圖, 18th c., China, H) history compendium
- Louisa Gurney Hoare (1784–1836, England, Ed/R)
- Marko Attila Hoare (born 1972, England, H)
- Philip Hoare (born 1958, England, H/Bg)
- Thomas Hobbes (1588–1679, England, Ph); Leviathan
- John Hobhouse, 1st Baron Broughton (1786–1869, England, Po/T)
- Eric Hobsbawm (1917–2012, England, H); The Age of Revolution: Europe 1789–1848
- Adam Hochschild (born 1942, US, J/Po)
- Susie Hodge (living, England, E/Ah)
- John Hodgkin (1766–1845, England, L)
- John Hodgkin (1800–1875, England, S/R)
- Thomas Hodgkin (1798–1866, England, M)
- Thomas Hodgkin (1831–1913, England, H)
- Marshall Hodgson (1922–1968, US, R)
- Nichi Hodgson (born 1983, England, J)
- Ove Hoegh-Guldberg (born 1959, Australia, N/Nh)
- Eric Hoffer (1902–1983, US, Ph); The True Believer
- Barbara Hofland (1770–1844, England, Ed/T)
- Douglas Hofstadter (born 1945, US, Ps/S); I Am a Strange Loop
- Raphael Holinshed (1529–1580, England, H); Holinshed's Chronicles
- Tom Holland (born 1968, England, H); In the Shadow of the Sword
- Lucia Ruggles Holman (1793–1886, US, T)
- Richard Holmes (born 1945, England, Bg)
- Richard Holmes (1946–2011, England, H)
- George Holyoake (1817–1906, England, Ph)
- Thomas Homer-Dixon (born 1956, Canada, Po/Nh)
- Hōnen (法然, 1133–1212, Japan, R); Senchakushū
- Mari Ruef Hofer (1858/59–1929, US, Ed, Mu)
- Lennox Honychurch (born 1952, Dominica, H); The Dominica Story
- Pieter Corneliszoon Hooft (1581–1647, Netherlands, H)
- Robert Hooke (1635–1703, England, Po)
- bell hooks (1952–2021, US, S), pseudonym of Gloria Jean Watkins
- Mary Hooper (1829–1904, England, C)
- Max Horkheimer (1895–1973, Germany/US, Ph/S); Eclipse of Reason
- Nick Hornby (born 1957, England, Lc); Fever Pitch
- Corinne Stocker Horton (1871–1947, US, A/Bg)
- Kazushi Hosaka (保坂 和志, born 1956, Japan, S)
- Samuel Elliott Hoskins (1799–1888, England, H)
- Louise Seymour Houghton (1838–1920, US, Bg/R)
- Vera Houghton (1914–2013, England, N/S)
- Albert Hourani (1915–1993, England, H); A History of the Arab Peoples
- Ebenezer Howard (1850–1928, England, S/Nh); To-Morrow: A Peaceful Path to Real Reform
- Henry Eliot Howard (1873–1940, England, Nh)
- John Eliot Howard (1807–1883, England, M/R)
- Luke Howard (1772–1864, England, Nh)
- Peter Howard (1908–1965, England, J/R); Guilty Men
- Mortimer Sloper Howell (1841–1925, England, L); A Grammar of the Classical Arabic Language...
- Francis Howgill (1618–1669, England, R)
- Alfred William Howitt (1830–1908, Australia, Pr/Nh)
- Anna Mary Howitt (1824–1884, England, R)
- William Howitt (1792–1879, England, H/Nh)
- Edmond Hoyle (1672–1769, England, Sp)
- Erich Hoyt (born 1950, US, Nh)
- Kenneth Hsu (born 1929, China/Switzerland, N/Nh)
- Louisa Hubbard (1836–1903, England, F/R)
- Robert Hughes (1938–2012, Australia/England, Fi); The Fatal Shore
- Emperor Huizong of Song (宋徽宗, 1082–1135, China, Lc/Aa)
- Mike Hulme (born 1960, England, N/Nh); Why We Disagree About Climate Change
- Alexander von Humboldt (1769–1859, Germany, Po)
- David Hume (1711–1776, Scotland, Po/H); A Treatise of Human Nature
- Hunayn ibn Ishaq (809–873, Caliphate of Baghdad, R/P) in Syriac and Arabic
- Henry Hunt (1773–1835, England, Po/C)
- Lynn Hunt (born 1945, US, H)
- Philip Hunton (c. 1600–1682, England, R/Po)
- Richard Hurd (1720–1808, England, R)
- Christopher Hussey (1899–1970, England, A)
- Sarah Huston (1848-1926, US, S)
- Sheila Hutchins (living, England, C)
- Lucy Hutchinson (1620–1681, England, Bg)
- Edward Hutton (1875–1969, England, T)
- Will Hutton (born 1950, England, T)
- Aldous Huxley (1894–1963, England/US, L/Lc); The Doors of Perception
- Anthony Huxley (1920–1992, England, Nh)
- Elspeth Huxley (1907–1997, Kenya/England, J/Nh)
- Gervas Huxley (1894–1971, Bg/S)
- Julian Huxley (1887–1975, England, N)
- Leonard Huxley (1860–1933, England, Bg)
- Thomas Henry Huxley (1825–1895, England, N); Man's Place in Nature
- Christiaan Huygens (1629–1695, Netherlands, N/Ma) in French or Latin
- Sibyl Marvin Huse (1866–1939, France/US, R)
- Gaius Julius Hyginus (c. 64 BC – AD 17, Ancient Rome, P)
- Jean Hyppolite (1907–1968, France, Ph)

== I ==
- Reizan Ido (井土霊山, 1859–1935, Japan, J/Po)
- Loraine Immen (1840–1927, US, Bg/Lc/T)
- Manjirō Inagaki (稲垣満次郎, 1861–1908, Japan, Po)
- Marilla Baker Ingalls (US, 1828–1902, US, Bg/H/R/S)
- William Inge (1860–1954, England, R)
- Kenkabō Inoue (井上剣花坊, 1870–1934, Japan, J)
- Muhammad Iqbal (محمد اِقبال, 1877–1938, British India, R, Po) in Persian, Urdu and English
- Evelyn Irons (1900–2000, Scotland, Af)
- Stella B. Irvine (1859–1926, US, S)
- Washington Irving (1883–1959, US, Bg/H)
- Rhys Isaac (1937–2010, South Africa/Australia, H)
- Christopher Isherwood (1904–1986, England/US, Lc)
- Ningetsu Ishibashi (石橋忍月, 1865–1926, Japan, Lc)
- Fujio Ishihara (石原藤夫, born 1933, Japan, N/Lc)
- Shintaro Ishihara (石原慎太郎, 1932–2022, Japan, Po)
- Jun Ishikawa (石川淳, 1899–1987, Japan, Lc)
- Hiromi Itō (伊藤比呂美, born 1955, Japan, R/F)
- Noe Itō (伊藤野枝, 1895–1923, Japan, Po/F)
- Alicja Iwańska (1918–1996, Poland, S)

== J ==
- Ian Jack (1945–2022, Scotland/England, J)
- Daphne Jackson (1936–1991, England, N/S)
- Katharine Johnson Jackson (1841–1921, United States, Me)
- Wes Jackson (born 1936, US, Nh)
- A. J. Jacobs (born 1968, US, S); The Guinea Pig Diaries: My Life as an Experiment
- Jane Jacobs (1916–2006, US/Canada, S/E); The Death and Life of Great American Cities
- Sarah S. Jacobs (1813–1902, US, H)
- Gustav Jäger (1832–1917, Germany, Nh/Aa)
- Wojciech Jagielski (born 1960, Poland, Po/S)
- C. L. R. James (1901–1989, Trinidad/England, H/J); The Black Jacobins
- Henry James (1843–1916, US/England, Lc); Italian Hours
- William James (1842–1910, US, Ph/Ps); The Principles of Psychology
- Anna Brownell Jameson (1794–1860, England, Fi/F)
- Alexander Jamieson (1782–1850, Scotland/England, Ed/P); A Celestial Atlas
- Vladimir Jankélévitch (1903–1985, France, Ph/Mu)
- Derek Jarman (1942–1994, England, G/Nh)
- Claude Scudamore Jarvis (1879–1953, England, S/Nh)
- John Cordy Jeaffreson (1831–1901, England, J/Bg)
- James Jeans (1877–1946, England, N/M)
- Roy Jenkins (1920–2003, England, Po)
- Edward Jenner (1749–1823, England, M/N)
- Derrick Jensen (born 1960, US, Nh); A Language Older Than Words
- Soame Jenyns (1704–1787, England, R/Po)
- Maria Jane Jewsbury (1800–1833, England, E/Lc
- Sophia Jex-Blake (1840–1912, England/Scotland, M/F)
- Saurav Jha (living, India, Nh) in English
- Jien (慈円, 1155–1225, Japan, H/R)
- Curuppumullage Jinarajadasa (1875–1953, Ceylon/England, M/R)
- Jocelyn de Brakelond (12th c., England, H) in Latin
- Ólafía Jóhannsdóttir (1863–1924, Iceland, S)
- John of Salisbury (c. 1120–1180, England/France, Ph/E) in Latin
- John of Worcester (died c. 1140, England, H) in Latin
- Electa Amanda Wright Johnson (1938–1929), US, T)
- Irving Johnson (1905–1991, US, Sp)
- Bobi Jones (1929–2017, Wales, L/R)
- Charles Colcock Jones Jr. (1831–1893, US, Po/H)
- Daniel Jones (1881–1967, England, L); English Pronouncing Dictionary
- Gareth Stedman Jones (born 1942, England, H)
- Richard Foster Jones (1886–1965, US, Lc)
- Rufus Jones (1863–1948, US, R)
- Carla de Jonge (1886-1972, Netherlands, Aa/H)
- T. Canby Jones (1921–2014, US, R)
- Van Jones (born 1968, US, Nh); The Green Collar Economy
- Helen Joseph (1905–1992, South Africa, Po/Lw)
- Rebecca Richardson Joslin (1846–1934, US, H/N)
- Leonie Joubert (living, South Africa, Nh); Scorched: South Africa's Changing Climate
- Alice Jouenne (1873–1954, France, Ed)
- Horace Freeland Judson (1931–2011, US, H/J)
- Pieter Judson (born 1956, Netherlands/US, H)
- Olivia Judson (born 1970, US, N)
- Carl Jung (1875–1961, Switzerland, Ps) in German, Psychiatric Studies
- Ernst Jünger (1895–1998, Germany, S/Nh); Storm of Steel
- Justin (2nd century AD, Ancient Rome, H) in Latin

== K ==
- Aleksander Kaczorowski (born 1969, J)
- Toyohiko Kagawa (賀川豊彦, 1888–1960, Japan, R/S)
- Barbara Kahan (1920–2000, England, Ed/S)
- Okakura Kakuzō (岡倉覚三, 1862–1913, Japan, Aa)
- Paul Kalanithi (1977–2015, US, M); When Breath Becomes Air
- Mary Kaldor (born 1949, England, Po/S)
- Wassily Kandinsky (1866–1944, Russia/France, Fi)
- Mitsuharu Kaneko (金子光晴, 1895–1975, Japan, T)
- Immanuel Kant (1724–1804, Germany, Ph); Critique of Pure Reason
- Ernst Kantorowicz (1895–1963, Germany/US, H)
- Sybil Kaplan (1938-2023, US, C)
- Ryszard Kapuściński (1932–2007, Poland, J/Po); The Emperor
- Dosabhai Framji Karaka (1829–1902, India, P/H)
- Nikolay Karamzin (1766–1826, Russia, H/Lc)
- Shakuntala Karandikar (1931–2018, India, Bg)
- Frigyes Karinthy (1887–1938, Hungary, J/Bg)
- Tawakkol Karman (born 1979, Yemen, Po/J)
- Joseph Karo (1488–1575, Spain/Ottoman Galilee, R); Shulchan Aruch
- Wojciech Karpiński (1943–2020, Poland, P/Bg)
- Souad Kassim Mohamed (born 1976, Djibouti, L)
- Mollie Katzen (born 1950, US, C); Moosewood Cookbook
- Julia Kavanagh (1824–1877, Ireland/France, Bg/S)
- Yoshikazu Kawaguchi (川口由一, 1939–2023, Japan, Ag/Nh)
- James Kay-Shuttleworth (1804–1877, England, Ed/S)
- Geoffrey Keating (Seathrún Céitinn, c. 1569 – c. 1644, Ireland, H)
- Elizabeth Keckley (1818–1907, US, Bg)
- John Keegan (1934–2012, England, H/Af); A History of Warfare
- David Keith (living, US, Nh)
- Jim Keith (1949–1999, US, J/Bg)
- Lierre Keith (born 1964, US, C/Nh)
- Herbert Kelly (1860–1950, England, R)
- Kevin Kelly (born 1952, US, Nh/I); Out of Control: The New Biology of Machines, Social Systems, and the Economic World
- Maeve Kelly (1930–2025, Ireland, F)
- Petra Kelly (1947–1992, Germany, Po/Nh)
- Thomas Raymond Kelly (1893–1941, US, R)
- Fanny Kemble (1809–1893, England, T)
- Richard Kemp (born 1959, England, J)
- Robert F. Kennedy Jr. (born 1954, US, Po/Nh); Crimes Against Nature
- Johannes Kepler (1571–1630, Austria/Germany, M/N); Mysterium Cosmographicum
- Ian Kershaw (born 1943, England, H/Af); The End: Hitler's Germany 1944–45
- Bruce Kershner (1950–2007, US, Nh)
- Jennifer Kewley Draskau (died 2024, Isle of Man, H/L)
- John Maynard Keynes (1883–1946, England, E)
- John Neville Keynes (1852–1949, England, E)
- Muhammad Mojlum Khan (born 1973, England, R/Lc)
- Omar Khayyam (1048–1131, Persia, M/N)
- Tracy Kidder (born 1945, US, I/Bg)
- Søren Kierkegaard (1813–1855, Denmark, Ph/S); Philosophical Fragments
- Garry Kilworth (born 1941, England, T)
- Kim Pusik (1075–1151, Korea, P)
- Hans E. Kinck (1865–1926, Norway, L)
- Gary Kinder (living, US, Cr)
- John King (1652–1732, England, R)
- Martin Luther King Jr. (1929–1968, US, Po/R); Why We Can't Wait
- Hugh Kingsmill (1889–1949, England, J)
- Maxine Hong Kingston (born 1940, US, F/S); No Name Woman
- Bruce Kinloch (1919–2011, England, Nh/T)
- Mokutarō Kinoshita (木下杢太郎, 1885–1945, Japan, Fi/Lc)
- Rudyard Kipling (1865–1836, India/England, J/T); From Sea to Sea and Other Sketches, Letters of Travel
- Geoffrey Kirk (1921–2003, England, H/Lc)
- Henry Kissinger (1923–2023, US, Po); Diplomacy
- Ikki Kita (北一輝, 1883–1937, Japan, Ph/Po)
- Morio Kita (北 杜夫, 1927–2011, Japan, Ps/Po)
- Chikafusa Kitabatake, (北畠親房, 1293–1354, Japan, Po/H)
- Tōkoku Kitamura (北村透谷, 1868–1894, Japan, Lc)
- William Kitchiner (1775–1827, England, NS/C)
- Iya Kiva (born 1984, Ukraine, J/Lc)
- Manshi Kiyozawa (清沢満之?, 1863–1903, Japan, R)
- Naomi Klein (born 1970, Canada, S/Po); This Changes Everything
- Gilbert Klingel (1908–1983, US, Nh/T)
- Friedrich Gottlieb Klopstock (1724–1803, Germany, L)
- Anne Knight (1786–1862, England, R/F)
- G. Wilson Knight (1897–1985, England, Lc)
- W. F. Jackson Knight (1895–1964, England, Lc/H)
- Lilian Knowles (1870–1926), England, E/H
- Ronald Knox (1888–1957, England, R)
- Hideo Kobayashi (小林秀雄, 1902–1983, Japan, Lc)
- Takiji Kobayashi (小林多喜二, 1903–1930, Japan, Po/Cr)
- Aya Kōda (幸田文, 1904–1990, Japan, Bg)
- Arthur Koestler (1905–1983, Hungary/England, Po/Af); Darkness at Noon
- Alfie Kohn (born 1957, US, E/S)
- Leszek Kołakowski (1927–2009, Poland/England, Ph)
- Elizabeth Kolbert (born 1961, US, J/Nh); Field Notes from a Catastrophe
- Ferenc Kölcsey (1790–1838, Hungary, Lc/Po)
- Hidemi Kon (今日出海, 1903–1984, Japan, Lc/J)
- Marie Kondo (近藤麻理恵, born c. 1985, Japan, B)
- György Konrád (1933–2019, Hungary/Germany, Po)
- Angus Konstam (born 1960, Scotland, H)
- János Kornai (1928–2021, Hungary, E/Po)
- David Korten (born 1937, US, Po/Nh); When Corporations Rule the World
- Hiroshi Koshiba (小柴博, 1884–1925, Japan, Ed)
- Sonya Koshkina (born 1985, Ukraine, H)
- Joel Kotkin (born 1952, US, S/J); The Next Hundred Million: America in 2050
- Jan Kott (1914–2001, Poland/US, Po/Lc)
- Joel Kovel (1936–2018, US, Po/Ps)
- Charles H. Kraft (born 1932, US, Ar/R)
- Bernie Krause (born 1938, US, Nh/Mu)
- Samuel Krauss (1866–1948, Hungary/England, R/H)
- Zundel Kroizer (1924–2014, Palestine/Israel, R)
- Marcin Kromer (1512–1589, Poland, H/S) in Latin and Polish; Polonia sive de situ, populis, moribus, magistratibus et Republica regni Polonici libri duo
- Peter Kropotkin (1842–1921, Russian Empire/France, Po/Ph); The Conquest of Bread
- Thomas Kuhn (1922–1996, US, N/Ph); The Structure of Scientific Revolutions
- Satish Kumar (born 1936, India, Nh)
- Corby Kummer (born c. 1956, US, C)
- James Howard Kunstler (born 1948, US, S/J); The Geography of Nowhere
- Simon Kuper (living, Netherlands/England, Sp/B) in English and Dutch
- Hyakuzō Kurata (倉田百三, 1891–1943, Japan, R)
- Hakuson Kuriyagawa (廚川白村, 1880–1923, Japan, Lc)
- Ray Kurzweil (born 1948, US, I/N)
- Arnold Kutzinski (1879–1956, Germany/Israel, M/Ps)

== L ==
- Marcus Antistius Labeo (died AD 10 or 11, Ancient Rome, Lw)
- Gary Lachman (born 1955, US, Ph/Mu); Turn Off Your Mind
- Winona LaDuke (born 1959, US, Po/Nh)
- Henri La Fontaine (1854–1943, Belgium, Lw)
- Joseph-Louis Lagrange (1736–1813, Italy/France, Ma/N)
- Tim LaHaye (1926–2016, US, R/S); The Act of Marriage (with Beverly LaHaye)
- Olivia Laing (born 1977, England, T)
- B. B. Lal (1921–2022, India, Ar); in English
- K. S. Lal (1920–2002, India, H); The Legacy of Muslim Rule in India
- Charles Lamb (1775–1834, England, Lc/H); Essays of Elia
- Mary Lamb (1764–1847, England, Lc)
- Ursula Lamb (1914–1996, Germany/US, H)
- Constant Lambert (1905–1951, England, Mu/D)
- Wilfred G. Lambert (1926–2011, England, H)
- Richard Lamm (1935–2021, US, Lw/Po)
- Ellen La Motte (1873–1961, US, M/J)
- Peter Lampe (born 1954)
- Suzanne Lamy (1929–1987, Canada, Lc) in French
- Joseph Lancaster (1778–1838, England, Ed); Improvements in Education
- Osbert Lancaster (1908–1983, England, A/T)
- David Landes (1924–2013, US, E/H)
- Mark Lane (1927–2016, US, L/Cr)
- Rose Wilder Lane (1886–1968, US, J/T)
- Andrew Lang (1844–1912, Scotland, H)
- Christian Lous Lange (1869–1938, Norway, H/Po)
- Ira M. Lapidus (born 1937, US, H)
- Emmanuel, comte de Las Cases (1766–1842, France, Po/H); The Memorial of Saint Helena
- Bruno Latour (1947–2022, France, Ph/S); We Have Never Been Modern
- Owen Lattimore (1900–1989, US, S/T)
- William Laud (1573–1645, England, R)
- John Law (1671–1729, Scotland/France, B/Ec)
- John Law (born 1946, England, S)
- D. H. Lawrence (1885–1930, England/US, T); Sea and Sardinia
- T. E. Lawrence (1888–1935, England/Syria, Ar/Po); Seven Pillars of Wisdom
- Nigel Lawson (1932–2023, England, Po)
- James Laxer (1941–2018, Canada, Po/H)
- Benjamin Lay (1682–1759, England/Pennsylvania, S)
- Charles Webster Leadbeater (1854–1934, England, R)
- Richard Leakey (1944–2022, Kenya/US, Ar/Nh)
- Louisa Leaman (born 1976, England, E/Nh)
- F. R. Leavis (1895–1978, England, Lc)
- James J. LeBar (1936–2008, US, R)
- Isabel LeBourdais (1909–2003, Canada, Cr); The Trial of Steven Truscott
- Robert Leckie (1920–2001, US, H/E)
- Le Corbusier (Charles-Édouard Jeanneret, 1887–1965, Switzerland/France, A/S)
- Francis Nigel Lee (1934–2011, England, R)
- Laurie Lee (1914–1997, England, T/Bg); Cider with Rosie
- Samuel Lee (1783–1852, England, L)
- Vernon Lee (Violet Paget, 1856–1935, France/Italy, Fi) in English
- James Lees-Milne (1908–1997, England, A/Bg)
- Jeremy Leggett (born 1954, England, B/Nh); Half Gone: Oil, Gas, Hot Air and the Global Energy Crisis
- Gottfried Wilhelm Leibniz (1646–1716, Germany, Po)
- Anthony Lejeune (1928–2018, England, Po/S); The Gentlemen's Clubs of London
- C. A. Lejeune (1897–1973, England, D); Cinema (1931)
- John Leland or Leyland (c. 1503–1552, England, H)
- Thomas Leland (1722–1785, Ireland, H)
- Pedro Lemebel (1952–2015, Chile, Po/S)
- Magdalena León de Leal (born 1939, Colombia, F/S)
- Miguel León-Portilla (1926–2019, Mexico, Ar/H)
- Aldo Leopold (1887–1948, US, Ph/Ny); A Sand County Almanac
- Jill Lepore (born 1966, US, H); These Truths: A History of the United States
- Lawrence Lessig (born 1961, US, Lw/Po); The Future of Ideas
- Doris Lessing (1919–2013, Southern Rhodesia/England, Lc); Time Bites: Views and Reviews
- Normand Lester (born 1945, Canada, J); Le Livre noir du Canada anglais
- Roger L'Estrange (1616–1704, England, Po)
- John Coakley Lettsom (1744–1815, England, M/Nh)
- Jean Leurechon (1591–1670, France, R/Ma)
- Eliphas Levi (1810–1875, France); Dogme et rituel de la haute magie
- Primo Levi (1919–1987, France, R); If This Is a Man
- Daniel Levitin (born 1957, US/Canada, Ps)
- Anthony Lewis (1927–2013, US, J); Gideon's Trumpet
- C. S. Lewis (1898–1963, Ireland/England, R); The Case for Christianity
- George Cornewall Lewis (1806–1863, England, Po/L)
- Nicholas Lezard (living, England, J/Lc)
- Edward Lhuyd (1660–1709, England/Wales, Nh/P)
- Li Zhisui (李志绥, 1919–1995, China/US, Po/Bg); The Private Life of Chairman Mao
- Howard Liddell (1945–2013, England/Scotland, A/Nh)
- Justus von Liebig (1803–1873, Germany, N/B)
- John Lilburne (1614–1657, England, Po/R)
- William Lily (Lilly or Lilye, c. 1468–1522, England, L) in Latin and English
- André Lima (born 1971, Brazil, Nh/T)
- Thomas Linacre or Lynaker (c. 1460–1524, England, S/M) in Latin
- Carl Linnaeus (1707–1778, Sweden, N/Nh); Systema Naturae in Latin
- Walter Lippmann (1889–1974, US, J); The Phantom Public
- David Lipsky (born 1965, US, J); Absolutely American
- Leon Litwack (1929–2021, US, H); Been In the Storm So Long: The Aftermath of Slavery
- Liu Xiaobo (刘晓波, 1955–2017, China, Lc/Po)
- Deborah Knox Livingston (1876–1923, Scotland/US, Po); Studies in Government
- Livy (Titus Livius, 64 or 59 BC – AD 17, Ancient Rome, H)
- Mario Vargas Llosa (1936–2025, Peru, J); The Perpetual Orgy
- Ramon Llull (c. 1232 – c. 1315, Kingdom of Majorca, P) in Catalan and Latin
- Gladys Edson Locke (1887-1945, US, H)
- John Locke (1632–1704, England, Ph/M)
- John Gibson Lockhart (1794–1854, Scotland, J/Bg)
- David Lodge (1935–2025, England, Lc); The Art of Fiction
- William Kennett Loftus (1820–1858, England, Ar/Nh)
- Eric Lomax (1919–2012, Scotland/England, Af)
- Peter Lombard (1096–1160, Italy/France, R)
- Bjørn Lomborg (born 1965, Denmark, Nh); The Skeptical Environmentalist
- Kathleen Lonsdale (1903–1971, England, N/Po)
- Hendrik Willem van Loon (1882–1944, Netherlands/US, H/E); The Story of Mankind
- J. Thomas Looney (1870–1944, England, Lc)
- María López Sández (born 1973, Spain, L)
- Walter Lord (1917–2002, US, H)
- Audre Lorde (1934–1992, US, F/S); Sister Outsider
- Jane C. Loudon (1807–1858, England, G)
- John Claudius Loudon (1783–1843, Scotland, Nh)
- Mary Frances Lovell (1843–1932, England/US, S)
- James Lovelock (1919–2022, England, Nh); The Revenge of Gaia
- Amory Lovins (born 1947, US, N/Nh); Reinventing Fire
- Ian Lowe (born 1942, Australia, Nh); Reaction Time: Climate Change and the Nuclear Option
- Roger Lowenstein (born 1954, US, B); When Genius Failed: The Rise and Fall of Long-Term Capital Management
- David Lowenthal (1923–2018, US, H/N)
- Richard Lower (1631–1691, England, M)
- John Livingston Lowes (1867–1945, US, Lc)
- Donald Lowrie (1875–1925, US, J)
- Percy Lubbock (1879–1965, England, Lc/Bg)
- Edward Lucie-Smith (born 1933, England, Lc/J)
- Fitz Hugh Ludlow (1836–1870, US, J)
- György Lukács (1885–1971, Hungary, Ph/Po)
- Arnold Lunn (1888–1974, England, Sp)
- Brian Lunn (1893–1966, England, Bg/T)
- Johanan Luria (15th – 16th cc., Alsace, R) in Hebrew
- Zhi Lü (吕植, born 1965, China, Nh)
- Charles Lyell (1797–1875, Scotland, N); Principles of Geology
- Philip Lymbery (born 1965, England, Ag/Nh); Farmageddon
- Mark Lynas (born 1973, England, Ag/Nh); Six Degrees: Our Future on a Hotter Planet
- John Lynch (c. 1599 – c. 1677, Ireland/France, R/H)
- F. S. L. Lyons (1923–1983, Ireland, H)
- Jean-François Lyotard (1924–1998, France, Ph/S); The Postmodern Condition

== M ==
- Peter Maas (1929–2001, US, J); The Valachi Papers
- Wangari Maathai (1940–2011, Kenya, S/Po)
- Catharine Macaulay (1731–1791, England, H)
- Frederick Macaulay (1882–1970, Canada, E)
- George Campbell Macaulay (1852–1915, England, Lc)
- Thomas Babington Macaulay (1800–1859, England, H/Po); The History of England from the Accession of James II
- Fiona MacCarthy (1940–2020, England, Bg/Aa)
- Muriel Irwin MacDonald (1867-1918, Canada/US, Po, S)
- Ann MacEwen (1918–2008, England, Nh)
- Alan Macfarlane (born 1941, England, Ar/H)
- Robert Macfarlane (born 1976, England, Nh)
- Scott MacGillivray (born 1957, US, D)
- James Drummond MacGregor (1759–1730, Scotland/Nova Scotia, R/S)
- Edouard Machery (living, US, Ph)
- Alasdair MacIntyre (1929–2025, Scotland/US, Ph)
- Agnes Mure Mackenzie (1891–1955, Scotland, H)
- Henry Mackenzie (1745–1831, Scotland, Po/Lc)
- Mary Mackie (living, England, A/G)
- Alasdair Maclean (1926–1994, Scotland, S/Ag)
- Fitzroy Maclean (1911–1996, Scotland, Af/H); Eastern Approaches
- Della Campbell MacLeod (ca. 1884 – ?, US, Bg/T)
- Margaret MacMillan (born 1943, Canada, H); Peacemakers: The Paris Peace Conference of 1919 and Its Attempt to End War
- John Macmurray (1891–1976, Scotland/England, Ph)
- Catherine Mary MacSorley (1848–1929, Ireland, R)
- Brenda Maddox (1932–2019, US/England, J/Bg)
- Heidrun E. Mader (born 1977), German/English
- Deborah Madison (living, US, C); Vegetarian Cooking for Everyone
- Antonine Maillet (1929–2025, Canada, Po) in French and Acadian French
- Agnes Catherine Maitland (1850–1906, England, E/C)
- Pierre des Maizeaux (1666 or 1673–1745, Geneva/England, Bg) in French
- Michael Majerus (1954–2009, England, Nh)
- Ken Major (J. Kenneth Major, 1928–2009, England, A/H)
- R. C. Majumdar (1884–1980, India, H); The History and Culture of the Indian People
- John Malcolm (1769–1833, Scotland/India, H)
- Rajiv Malhotra (born 1950, India, R/Po); Being Different
- Gitta Mallasz (1907–1992, Hungary/France, R)
- Chalda Maloff (born 1946, Germany, S)
- Dumas Malone (1892–1986, US, H/Bg); Jefferson and His Time
- Thomas Robert Malthus (1766–1834, England, S); An Essay on the Principle of Population
- William Manchester (1922–2004, US, Bg/H)
- Bernard Mandeville (1670–1733, Netherlands/England, Ph/E)
- Richmal Mangnall (1769–1820, England, E)
- Charles C. Mann (born 1955, US, N/Nh)
- Michael E. Mann (born 1965, US, N/Nh); The Hockey Stick and the Climate Wars: Dispatches from the Front Lines
- Samuel Mann (living, New Zealand, E/Nh)
- Thomas Mann (1875–1955, Germany/US, Lc/Po); The Coming Victory of Democracy
- María Emma Mannarelli (born 1954, Peru, F/S)
- Harvey Manning (1925–2006, US, Sp/T)
- Richard Manning (born 1951, US, J/Nh)
- Robert Mannyng (Robert de Brunne, c. 1275 – c. 1338, H/R) in Middle English
- Gideon Mantell (1790–1852, England, Nh)
- Saadat Hasan Manto (1912–1955, India/Pakistan, Po)
- Jane Marcet (1769–1858, England, Ec/S)
- Hubert Marcoux (1941–2009, Canada, T)
- Herbert Marcuse (1898–1979, Germany/US, Ph/S); One-Dimensional Man
- Filippo Tommaso Marinetti (1876–1944, Italy, Lc/Po)
- Beryl Markham (1902–1986, England/Kenya, Tr); West with the Night
- Gervase Markham (c. 1568–1637, E, C/P); The English Huswife
- Emma Marris (born 1979, US, Nh)
- Thomas Marryat (1730–1792, England, M/S)
- Philip Marsden (born 1961, England, T)
- George Marshall (born 1964, Nh/Po)
- George Perkins Marsh (1801–1882, US, L); Man and Nature
- Agnes Marshall (1855–1905, England, C)
- Alan Marshall (1902–1984, Australia, T/Nh)
- Alfred Marshall (1842–1924, England, E)
- Everett Dean Martin (1880–1941, US, Ed/S)
- James Martin (1933–2013, England, I)
- William Martin (1767–1810, England, Nh)
- Harriet Martineau (1802–1876, England, S/Po)
- James Martineau (1805–1900, England, R/Ph)
- Margaret Maruani (1954–2022, Tunisia/France, F/S)
- Saiichi Maruya (丸谷才, 1925–2012, Japan, Lc)
- Karl Marx (1818–1883, Germany/England, Po/E); The Communist Manifesto
- Lorenzo Mascheroni (1750–1800, Italy, Ma)
- Robert K. Massie (1929–2019, US, H/Bg)
- David Masson (1822–1907, Scotland, Lc/H)
- George Joseph Gustave Masson (1819–1888, France/England, Lc/H)
- Steve Matchett (born 1962, US, J)
- Hilda Matheson (1888–1940, England, J/F)
- John Matteson (born 1961, US, Bg/Lw); Eden's Outcasts
- Anne Matthews (living, US, Nh)
- Garrett Mattingly (1900–1962, US, Af/H); The Defeat of the Spanish Armada
- Pierre Louis Maupertuis (1698–1759, France, P)
- Frederick Denison Maurice (1805–1872, England, R/Po)
- James Clerk Maxwell (1831–1879, Scotland/England, Ma/N)
- Milton Mayer (1908–1986, US, J/Ed)
- Peter Mayle (1939–2018, England/France, T); A Year in Provence
- Joyce Maynard (born 1953, US, J)
- DeBarra Mayo (born 1953, US, M)
- Giuseppe Mazzini (1805–1872, Italy, Po/S)
- Nell McCafferty (1944–2024, Ireland, J/F)
- Timothy R. McClanahan (born 1957, US, N/Nh)
- Walter A. McDougall (born 1946, US, H)
- Michael J. McGuire (born 1947, US, N/Nh)
- Alastair McIntosh (born 1955, Scotland, Nh)
- Steve McIntyre (born 1947, US, Nh)
- Ian McKay (born 1962, England/Scotland, Po/Nh)
- Bill McKibben (born 1960, US, Nh); The End of Nature
- Eva McLaren (1852–1921, England, Po/F)
- Adam McLean (born 1948, Scotland, R)
- Ella N. McLean, Countess Norraikow (1849–1913, Canada, Po)
- Marshall McLuhan (1911–1980, Canada, Ph/S); The Gutenberg Galaxy
- Barbara McMartin (1931–2005, US, Nh)
- Thomas McNamee (born 1947, US, Nh)
- Esther Lord McNeill (1812–1907, US, T)
- F. Marian McNeill (1885–1973, Scotland, S/C)
- John McPhee (born 1931, US, J/Nh); Annals of the Former World
- Margaret Mead (1901–1978, US, S)
- Dennis Meadows (born 1942, US, N/Nh)
- Donella Meadows (1941–2001, Nh)
- Thomas Medwin (1788–1869, England, Bg)
- Arthur Mee (1875–1943, England, E)
- Arthur Butler Phillips Mee (1860–1926, Scotland, J/N)
- Fulvio Melia (born 1956, US, N)
- Francisco Manuel de Mello (1608–1666, Portugal, Bg/S)
- William Melmoth (1665/66–1743, England, R/Lw)
- Rigoberta Menchú (born 1959, Guatemala, F)
- Susan Mendus (born 1951, Wales/England, Ph/Po)
- Nicholas Mercator (c. 1620–1687, Germany/England, Ma)
- Louis-Sébastien Mercier (1740–1814, France, Lc)
- Francis Meres (1565/66–1647, England, Lc/R); Palladis Tamia, Wits Treasury
- Christopher Merret (1614 or 1615–1695, England, Nh/S)
- Jenny B. Merrill (1854–1934, US, Ed/R)
- Marin Mersenne (1588–1648, France, P)
- Károly Újfalvy von Mezőkövesd (1842–1904, Hungary/France, L) in French
- John Michell (1724–1793, England, N)
- Robert Michels (1876–1936, Germany/Italy, S/Po)
- James A. Michener (1907–1997, US, Po/S); The Voice of Asia
- Kelemen Mikes (1690–1761, Transylvania/Ottoman Empire, Po/T) in Hungarian
- Jack Miles (born 1942, US, R/Po)
- James Mill (1773–1836, Scotland, H/E)
- John Stuart Mill (1806–1873, England, Po/E); On Liberty
- Walter Samuel Millard (1864–1952, England/India, Nh/G)
- Beatrix Miller (1923–2014, England, Fa/Aa)
- Dora Richards Miller (1842–1914, US/Denmark/England, Af)
- Hugh Miller (1802–1856, Scotland, N/R)
- Karl Miller (1931–2014, England, J/Kc)
- Nellie Burget Miller (1875–1952, US, D)
- C. Wright Mills (1916–1962, US, S); The Sociological Imagination
- Henry Hart Milman (1791–1868, England, H)
- A. A. Milne (1882–1956, England, E)
- Joseph Milner (1744–1797, England, R)
- Czesław Miłosz (1911–2004, Poland/US, L/Po); The Captive Mind
- John Milton (1608–1674, England, P); Areopagitica
- Kumagusu Minakata (南方熊楠, 1867–1941, Japan, N/Nh)
- Anupam Mishra (1948–2016, India, Nh)
- Pankaj Mishra (born 1969, India, Po/S)
- Munesuke Mita (見田宗介, 1937–2022, Japan, S)
- Basil Mitchell (1917–2011, England, R/S)
- George J. Mitchell (born 1933, US, Po)
- Joseph Mitchell (1908–1996, US, J)
- Lillian M. Mitchner (1862/64–1954, US, S)
- Jessica Mitford (1917–1996, England/US, J/Po); The American Way of Death
- Nancy Mitford (1904–1973, England, J/Bg)
- Minae Mizumura (水村美苗, born 1951, Japan, Lc)
- Azadeh Moaveni (born 1976, US, J/Po)
- Dusé Mohamed (1866–1945, Egypt/England, Po/T)
- Georg Mohr (1640–1697, Denmark, Ma); in Danish and Dutch
- József Molnár (1918–2009, Hungary/Germany, J) in Hungarian
- Mária Molnár (born 1966, Hungary, Fi)
- Natyaguru Nurul Momen (1908–1990, Bangladesh/India, Lw/T)
- Theodor Mommsen (1817–1903, Germany, H/Lw); History of Rome
- George Monbiot (born 1963, England, J/Nh)
- Messenger Monsey (1694–1788, England, M/S)
- Elizabeth Montagu (1718–1800, England, Lc)
- Simon Sebag Montefiore (born 1965, England, J/H)
- Montesquieu (1689–1755, France, Po/P)
- Andrew Montford (living, England, Nh); The Hockey Stick Illusion
- James Montgomery (1771–1854, Scotland/England, Lc)
- Susanna Moodie (1803–1885, England/Canada, Nh/S); Roughing it in the Bush
- Chris Mooney (born 1977, US, J); The Republican War on Science
- Michael Moore (born 1954, US, J/Po); Stupid White Men
- Paul Morand (1888–1976, France, Po/S)
- Elinor Mordaunt (1872–1942, England/Australia, T)
- Ethan Mordden (born 1949, US, Mu)
- Hannah More (1745–1833, England, R/S)
- Henry More (1614–1687, England, Ph)
- Thomas More (1478–1535, England, Po/R)
- E. D. Morel (1873–1924, England, Po); The Black Man's Burden
- Elaine Morgan (1920–2013, Wales, J/P)
- Alexander Morison (1779–1866, Scotland, M)
- Tama Morita (森田たま, 1894–1970, Japan, Po/T)
- John Morley (1838–1923, England, Po/Lc)
- Desmond Morris (born 1928, England, N/S)
- Ruth Morris (1933–2001, Canada, Lw)
- William Morris (1834–1896, England, Aa/S)
- Penelope Mortimer (1918–1999, England, Bg/T)
- Andrew Morton (born 1953, England, J/Bg); Tom Cruise: An Unauthorized Biography
- Norinaga Motoori (本居宣長, 1730–1801, Japan, Ph/Lc)
- Lucretia Mott (1793–1880, US, Po/F)
- Julia Moulden (born 1956, Canada, J)
- Roger Gougenot des Mousseaux (1805–1876, France, J)
- John Mott (1865–1965, US, R)
- Thomas Muffet (1553–1604, England, Nh/M)
- Mumtaz Mufti (1905–1995, British India/Pakistan, R) in Urdu
- Malcolm Muggeridge (1903–1990, England, J); Something Beautiful for God
- John Muir (1838–1914, Scotland/US, Nh/N); Stickeen: An Adventure with a Dog and a Glacier
- Siddhartha Mukherjee (born 1970, India/US, M/N); The Emperor of All Maladies
- Denis Mukwege (born 1955, Congo, M/R)
- Clare Mulley (born 1969, England, Bg)
- Nadia Murad (born 1993, Iraq/Germany, S)
- Haruki Murakami (村上春樹, born 1949, Japan, Lc); What I Talk About When I Talk About Running
- Claudia Quigley Murphy (1863–1941, US, S)
- John A. Murphy (1927–2022, Ireland, H)
- Lindley Murray (1745–1826, US/England, L/Ed)
- Sarah Murray (1744–1811, England, T)
- Julie Myerson (born 1960, England, S)
- Gunnar Myrdal (1898–1987, Sweden, E/S); An American Dilemma

== N ==
- Joaquim Nabuco (1849–1910, Brazil, Po)
- Ted Nace (born 1956, US, B/Nh)
- Inada Nada (なだ いなだ, 1929–2013, Japan, Ps/Lc)
- Ralph Nader (born 1934, US, E/Nh); Unsafe at Any Speed
- V. S. Naipaul (1932–2018, Trinidad/England, T/S); Among the Believers: An Islamic Journey
- Torajirō Naitō (内藤虎次郎, 1866–1934, Japan, H)
- Akio Nakamori (中森明夫, born 1960, Japan, J)
- Mitsuo Nakamura (中村光夫, 1911–1988, Japan, Bg/Lc)
- Chie Nakane (中根千枝, 1926–2021, Japan, S)
- Kōji Nakano (中野孝次, 1925–2004, Japan, Lc)
- James Napier (1810–1884, Scotland, N/H)
- James Robert Napier (1821–1879, Scotland, N)
- John Napier (1550–1617, Scotland, Ma/R)
- Ryūhoku Narushima (成島柳北, 1837–1884, Japan, H)
- Mary Louise Nash (1826–1896, US, Ed)
- Taslima Nasrin (born 1962, India/Sweden, F/R) in Bengali and English Jabo na keno? jabo
- Friedrich Naumann (1960–1919, Germany, Po/R); Mitteleuropa
- Marysa Navarro (1934–2025, Spain, H)
- James Nayler (1616–1660, England, R)
- John Neal (1793–1876, US, P)
- Mark E. Neely Jr. (born 1944, US, H); The Fate of Liberty: Abraham Lincoln and Civil Liberties
- A. S. Neill (1883–1973, Scotland/England, E/Ps); Summerhill
- Stephen L. Nelson (born 1959, US, I)
- László Németh (1901–1975, Hungary, Po/S)
- Cornelius Nepos (110–25 BC, Ancient Rome, Bg)
- John Henry Newman (1801–1890, England, R); Apologia Pro Vita Sua
- Peter C. Newman (1929–2023, Canada, J/S); The Canadian Establishment
- Stella Mary Newton (1901–2001, England, Aa/Fa)
- Beverley Nichols (1898–1983, England, J/G)
- Josephine R. Nichols (1838–1897, US, S)
- Joseph Shield Nicholson (1850–1927, England/Scotland, E/H)
- C. W. Nicol (1940–2020, Wales/Japan, Nh)
- Carsten Niebuhr (1733–1815, Germany/Denmark, Ma/T)
- Reinhold Niebuhr (1892–1971, US, R/Po); The Nature and Destiny of Man
- Friedrich Nietzsche (1844–1900, Germany, Ph/L)
- Andrew Nikiforuk (living, Canada, J/Nh)
- Kitarō Nishida (西田幾多郎, 1870–1945, Japan, Ph)
- Inazō Nitobe (新渡戸稲造, 1862–1933, Japan, Ag/E); Bushido: The Soul of Japan
- Louis Nizer (1902–1994, US, Lw); My Life in Court
- Shomu Nobori (昇曙夢, 1878–1958, Japan, Lc/Po)
- John Howard Nodal (1831–1909, England, L)
- Nel Noddings (1929–2022, US, F/E)
- Philip Noel-Baker (1889–1982, England, Po/Mi)
- Manuel Chaves Nogales (1897–1944, Spain/England, J/Po)
- Fujio Noguchi (野口富士男, 1911–1993, Japan, Bg/H)
- Edward A. Nolfi (born 1958, US, Lw)
- Hiroshi Noma (野間宏, 1915–1991, Japan, Lc)
- Masahiko Nomi (能見正比古, 1925–1981, Japan, J/Sp)
- Richard B. Norgaard (born 1943, US, E/Nh)
- Helena Norberg-Hodge (born 1946, Sweden, E/Nh); Ancient Futures
- Caroline Norton (1808–1877, England, S/F)
- Morilla M. Norton (1865–1916, US, T)
- Martin Noth (1902–1968, Germany, R)

== O ==
- Frederick Oakeley (1802–1880, England, R)
- Richard Baptist O'Brien (1809–1985, Ireland, R/P)
- Richard Barry O'Brien (1847–1918, Ireland, J/H)
- Julius Obsequens (mid-4th c. AD, Ancient Rome, H)
- John Cornelius O'Callaghan (1805–1883, Ireland, H)
- Mark O'Connor (born 1945, Australia, Nh/T)
- Tomas O'Crohan (1856–1937, Ireland, Bg) in Irish Gaelic
- Kenzaburō Ōe (大江健三郎, 1935–2023, Japan, Lc/Po)
- Yōko Ogawa (小川 洋子, born 1962, Japan, Ma/Ps)
- Charles Kay Ogden (1889–1957, England, L/Ph)
- Redmond O'Hanlon (born 1947, England, Lc)
- Kakuzō Okakura (岡倉覚三, 1862–1913, Japan, Fi/Aa)
- Daniel Okrent (born 1948, US, Sp/Po)
- Łucja Okulicz-Kozaryn (1933–1999, Poland, Ar)
- William Oldys (1696–1761, England, H)
- Margaret Oliphant (1828–1897, Scotland/England, H)
- Jamie Oliver (born 1975, England, C)
- David Olusoga (b 1970, England, J/S)
- Carola Oman (1897–1978, England, Bg/H)
- Dermot O'Neill (living, Ireland, G)
- Gerard K. O'Neill (1927–1992, US, N)
- Makoto Ōoka (大岡信, 1931–2017, Japan, Lc)
- Shōhei Ōoka (大岡昇平, 1909–1988, Japan, Lc)
- Amelia Opie (1769–1853, England, Bg/T)
- Iona and Peter Opie (1923–2017 and 1918–1982, England, E)
- Joachim Oppenheim (1832–1891, Austrian Empire, R)
- Naomi Oreskes (born 1958, US, H/E)
- Iris Origo (1902–1988, England/Italy, T/H)
- Shinobu Orikuchi (折口信夫, 1887–1953, Japan, S)
- P. J. O'Rourke (1947–2022, US, J)
- John Boyd Orr (1880–1971, Scotland, Ag/N)
- Hans Christian Ørsted (1777–1851, Denmark, N)
- Garcia de Orta (c. 1501–1568, Portugal, M/Nh); Colóquios dos simples e drogas da India
- Samuel Orton (1879–1948, US, M)
- Julia A. Orum (1843–1904, US, D)
- George Orwell (real name Eric Blair, 1903–1950, England, Po)
- Henry Fairfield Osborn Jr. (1887–1969, US, Nh); Our Plundered Planet
- Muiris Ó Súilleabháin (1904–1950, Ireland, S/T)
- Fintan O'Toole (born 1958, Ireland, J)
- Riki Ott (born 1954, US, N/Nh)
- Otto of Freising (c. 1114–1158, Germany, R/H) in Latin
- César Oudin (c. 1560–1625, France, Bk/L)
- William Oughtred (1574–1660, England, M/R) in Latin
- P. D. Ouspensky (1878–1947, Russia/England, R/S); In Search of the Miraculous
- Frank Owen (1905–1979, England); Guilty Men (co-author)
- Robert Owen (1771–1858, Wales/England, B/Po)
- Henry Nutcombe Oxenham (1829–1888, England, R)
- Frédéric Ozanam (1813–1853, France, Po)

== P ==
- Tadeusz Pacholczyk (born 1965, US, R)
- Luca Pacioli (c. 1447–1517, Italy, Ma/R); De ludo scachorum
- Karen A. Page (born 1962, US, C)
- Russell Page (1906–1985, England, G)
- Thomas Paget, Lord Paget (1689–1742, England, Po)
- Thomas Paine (1737–1809, England/US, Po); Rights of Man
- Thomas Pakenham (born 1933, England, H/Nh); The Scramble for Africa
- Agustina Palacio de Libarona (1825–1880, Argentina, Po)
- William Paley (1743–1805, England, R/Ph); Natural Theology
- Michael Palin (born 1943, England, T/S); New Europe
- Parker Palmer (born 1939, US, Ed/S)
- Robert Palmer (1945–1997, US, Mu)
- Jane Ellen Panton (1847–1923, England, C)
- William Williams Pantycelyn (1717–1791, Wales, R) in Welsh
- Isaac Pardo (18th c., Bosnia, R)
- Jacob Pardo (18th c., Dalmatia, R/Ed)
- Jacob Vita Pardo (1822–1843, Dalmatia, R)
- Joseph Pardo (c. 1624–1677, Netherlands/England, R/Mu)
- Moses Pardo (died 1888, Palestine/Egypt, R/Lw)
- Derek Parfit (1942–2017, UK, Ph); Reasons and Persons
- Geoffrey Parker (born 1943, England/US, H)
- Robert Parker (c. 1564–1615, England, R)
- Fanny Parkes (Parks, 1794–1875, India/England, T)
- David Parlett (born 1939, England, Sp)
- Blaise Pascal (1623–1662, France, Ma/R)
- Frédéric Passy (1822–1912, E/Po)
- Grace Espy Patton (1896–1904, US, Ed/F)
- Caroline Paul (born 1963, US, F/Bg)
- Elliot Paul (1891–1958, US, J); Life and Death of a Spanish Town
- Linus Pauling (1901–1994, US, N/Po)
- Octavio Paz (1914–1998, Mexico, S/Po); The Labyrinth of Solitude
- Elizabeth Peabody (1804–1894, US, Ed)
- George Peacock (1791–1858, England, Ma)
- Norman Vincent Peale (1898–1993, US, R/S); The Power of Positive Thinking
- Hugh Pearman (living, England, A)
- Guy Pearse (living, Australia, Nh); High and Dry
- John Pearson (1930–2021, England, Bg); The Life of Ian Fleming
- F. David Peat (1938–2017, England/Canada, N)
- Francis Peck (1692–1743, England, P)
- Samuel Pegge (1704–1796, E, P)
- John Pell (1611–1685, England, Ma/Po)
- David Naguib Pellow (born 1969, US, Nh)
- Isaac Penington (1616–1679, R)
- Thomas Pennant (1726–1798, Wales, Nh/T)
- Jessie Penn-Lewis (1861–1927, Wales, R)
- Francis Penrose (1817–1903, England, A/Ar)
- Petrus Peregrinus de Maricourt (fl. 1269, France, N) in Latin
- Eleanor Perenyi (1918–2009, Hungary/US, S/G)
- Ron Pernick (living, US, Nh)
- Alice E. Heckler Peters (1845–1921, US, S)
- Richard Stanley Peters (1919–2011, England, Ph/Ps)
- Neal Petersen (living, South Africa, Sp) in English
- Giovanni Pettinato (1934–2011, Italy, Ar)
- William Petty (1623–1687, England, Ec/N)
- Georges de Peyrebrune (1841–1917, France, F)
- Anshel Pfeffer (living, England/Israel, J/Bg)
- Ida Laura Pfeiffer (1797–1858, Austrian Empire, T/Nh)
- Anna Augusta Von Helmholtz-Phelan (1890–1964, US, Lc)
- John Phillips (1631–1706, Po/H)
- Robert Georges Picard (born 1951, US, B/E)
- Lillian Hoxie Picken (1852–1913, US, Ed)
- Ferry Piekart (born 1974, Netherlands, Sp)
- Charles P. Pierce (born 1953, US, Sp/J)
- Melissa Holbrook Pierson (born 1957, US, T/Sp)
- Ben Pimlott (1945–2004, England, H/Bg)
- Sharon Pincott (born 1962, Australia, Nh)
- Steven Pinker (born 1954, Canada/US, L); The Language Instinct
- Walter B. Pitkin (1878–1953, US, Ph/S)
- Christine de Pizan (1364 – c. 1430, France, F); The Book of the City of Ladies
- Josep Pla (1897–1981, Spain/France, J) in Catalan
- Ian Plimer (born 1946, Australia, B/Nh); Heaven and Earth
- Pliny the Elder (Gaius Plinius Secundus, AD 23–79, Ancient Rome, N)
- Pliny the Younger (Gaius Plinius Caecilius Secundus, AD 61 – c. 113, Ancient Rome, S/R)
- John H. Plumb (1911–2001, England, H)
- Plutarch (c. 46–120, Greece, Bg/P); Parallel Lives
- David Francis Pocock (1928–2007, England, Ar)
- Frederik Pohl (1919–2013, US, Nh)
- William Pokhlyobkin (1923–2000, Russia, C)
- Karl Polanyi (1886–1964, Austria/Canada, E/H); The Great Transformation
- William Pole (1561–1635, England, H)
- William Pole (1814–1900, England, N/M)
- Michael Pollan (born 1955, US, Nh/C); The Omnivore's Dilemma
- William Pollard (1828–1893, England, R)
- Gary Pomerantz (born 1960, US, J)
- Édouard de Pomiane (1875–1964, France, N/C)
- George Ayliffe Poole (1809–1883, England, R/A)
- Carl Pope (living, US, Nh)
- James Pope-Hennessy (1916–1974, England, Bg/T)
- Karl Popper (1902–1994, Austria/England, Ph); The Logic of Scientific Discovery
- Porphyry (c. 234 – c. 305, Ancient Rome, Ph)
- Robert Percival Porter (1852–1917, UK/US, E)
- Richard Posner (1939–2026, US, Lw/E); Catastrophe: Risk and Response
- Jacob Post (1774–1855, England, R)
- Sandra Postel (living, US, Nh)
- Baron du Potet (1796–1881, France/England, M)
- Christopher Potter (born 1959, England, J)
- Anna M. Longshore Potts (1829–1912, US, Me)
- Adam Clayton Powell Sr. (1865–1953, US, R)
- Arthur E. Powell (1882–1969, Wales/US, R)
- Dennis M. Powers (born 1942, US, Lw/J)
- James Van Praagh (born 1958, US, R/J)
- Suzana Prates (1940–1988, Brazi, F/S)
- William H. Prescott (1796–1859, US, H)
- Paul Preston (born 1946, England, H)
- William Thierry Preyer (1841–1897, England/Germany, M/N)
- Richard Price (1723–1791, Wales/England, R/E)
- James Cowles Prichard (1786–1848, England, M/Ps)
- Joseph Priestley (1733–1804, England, P)
- Anant Priolkar (1895–1973, India, H); The Goa Inquisition
- Rebecca Probert (born 1973, England, Lw/H)
- Robert Proud (1728–1813, England/US, H/Po)
- Pierre-Joseph Proudhon (1809–1865, France, Ph); What Is Property?
- Annie Proulx (born 1935, US, Ag/G)
- William Prynne (1600–1669, England, Po/R); Histriomastix
- Hermann, Fürst von Pückler-Muskau (1785–1871, Germany, G/T)
- Madeleine d'Arsant de Puisieux (1720–1798, France, S/F)
- Ferenc Pulszky (1814–1897, Hungary/Italy, Po/T) in German and Hungarian
- Maria Purdy Peck (1840–1914, US, H)
- Louise C. Purington (1844–1916, US, Me/R)
- Thomas Purnell (1834–1889, Ireland/England, D/Lc)
- John Pye-Smith (1774–1851, England, R/N)
- Robert Michael Pyle (born 1947, US, Nh); Wintergreen
- Stephen J. Pyne (living, US, Nh); Awful Splendour: A Fire History of Canada
- Pythagoras (c. 570 – c. 495 BC, Ancient Greece, Ph/M)

== Q ==
- Francisco de Quevedo (1580–1645, Spain, R/Lc)
- John Quick (1636–1706, England, R)
- Harry Quilter (1851–1907, England, Fi/Lc)
- Harriet Quimby (1875–1912, US, J/T)
- Phineas Quimby (1802–1866, US, R/M)
- Thomas de Quincey (1785–1959, England, P)
- Anna Quindlen (born 1953, US, J/S)
- Randolph Quirk (1920–2017, Isle of Man/England, L/Lc); A Comprehensive Grammar of the English Language
- Sayyid Qutb (1906–1966, Egypt, R/Po); Milestones

== R ==
- Alexander Radishchev (1749–1802, Russia, T/S); Journey from St. Petersburg to Moscow
- Saul Rae (1914–1999, Canada, S)
- Stamford Raffles (1781–1826, England/East Indies, H/Po); The History of Java
- Thomas Raikes (1777–1848, England/France, B/Fa)
- Arthur Raistrick (1896–1991, England, Po)
- Mihai Ralea (1896–1964, Romania/France, S/Po)
- Nilakanta Sri Ram (1889–1973, India, R)
- Vilayanur S. Ramachandran (born 1951, India/US, M/Ps); Phantoms in the Brain
- Andrew Michael Ramsay (1686–1743, Scotland/France, R)
- Ayn Rand (1905–1982, US, Ph); Philosophy: Who Needs It
- Jørgen Randers (born 1945, Norway, Ec/Nh); The Limits to Growth (co-author)
- Ray Raphael (born 1943, US, H)
- Rashi (1040–1105, France, R) in Hebrew
- Valentin Rasputin (1937–2015, Soviet Union/Russia, Ag/T)
- Derek Ratcliffe (1929–2005, England, Nh); A Nature Conservation Review
- Paul Rauber (living, US, J/Nh)
- John Ray (1627–1705, England, Nh)
- Hazel Alden Reason (1901–1976, England, N)
- Libby Rees (born 1995, England, S)
- Simon Reeve (born 1972, England, J/T)
- Amber Reeves (1887–1981, England, F/Po)
- Emil Reich (1854–1910, Hungary/England, S)
- Eleanor Mary Reid (1860–1953, England, Nh)
- Clement Reid (1853–1916, England, Ph)
- Pat Reid (1910–1990, England, Mi)
- Thomas Reid (1710–1796, Scotland, Ph)
- Emma May Alexander Reinertsen (1853–1920, US, S)
- Haru M. Reischauer (ハル松方ライシャワー, 1915–1998, Japan, J)
- Ernest Renan (1823–1892, France, L/H)
- Juliette Rennes (born 1976, France, F/S)
- Magdalena Dobromila Rettigová (1785–1845, Austrian Empire, C)
- Nicholas Revett (1721–1804, England, A)
- Andrew Revkin (born 1956, US, J/N)
- Zineb El Rhazoui (born 1982, Morocco/France, J) in French
- Ebenezer Rhodes (1762–1839, England, Nh/B)
- Richard Rhodes (born 1937, US, H/J)
- Robert of Ketton (fl. 1141–1157, England/Spain, R) in Latin
- Riazuddin (1930–2013, Pakistan, N)
- David Ricardo (1772–1823, England, E)
- Richard of Devizes (fl. late 12th c., England, H) in Latin
- Audrey Richards (1899–1984, England/Northern Rhodesia, S); Chisungu
- I. A. Richards (1893–1979, England, E/Lc); The Meaning of Meaning
- John Richardson (1667–1753, England, Bg)
- John Richardson (1924–2019, England, Bg/Fi)
- Jonathan Richardson (1667–1745, England, Fi)
- Lewis Fry Richardson (1881–1953, England, N/Po)
- Ed Ricketts (1897–1948, US, N/Ph); Between Pacific Tides
- M. C. Ricklefs (1943–2019, Australia, H/T)
- Mark Ridley (1560 – c. 1624, England, L)
- Mark Ridley (born 1956, England, N)
- Matt Ridley (born 1958, England, J/B)
- Alois Riegl (1858–1905, Austria, Fi); Stilfragen
- Jeremy Rifkin (born 1945, US, Ec/S); The Third Industrial Revolution
- Jonathan Riley-Smith (1938–2016, England)
- Sara Rittenhouse Brown (1854–1938, US, L)
- Graham Robb (born 1958, England, Lc/Aa) in English and French
- Robert of Cricklade (c. 1100 – 1174/1179, England, R/Bg)
- Francis Roberts (1609–1675, England, R)
- Jason Roberts (living, US, J)
- Paul Roberts (living, US, J); The End of Oil
- Stephen Roberts (1958–2022, England, H)
- Wayne Roberts (1944–2021, Canada, C/Po)
- William Robertson (1721–1793, Scotland, H)
- David Robinson (born 1930, England, J/Aa)
- Henry Crabb Robinson (1775–1867, England, J/Lc)
- Jane Robinson (born 1959, Scotland/England, H)
- William Robinson (1838–1935, Ireland/England, G)
- Antonio Rocco (1586–1653, Italy, R/Ph); L'Alcibiade, fanciullo a scola
- Anita Roddick (1942–2007, England, B/S)
- Maxime Rodinson (1915–2004, France, H/S); Muhammad
- Arabella Page Rodman (1867–1955, US, T)
- Mark Roeder (born 1957, England/Australia, B/S)
- Byron Rogers (born 1942, Wales/England, J/Bg)
- John Rogers (1679–1729, England, R)
- Franz Roh (1890–1965, Germany, H/Fi)
- John K. Rollinson (1884–1948, US, T/Nh)
- L. T. C. Rolt (1910–1974, England, T/Bg); Narrow Boat
- Isabella Frances Romer (1798–1852, England, T/Bg)
- Emma Romeu (living, Cuba, J/Nh)
- Joseph J. Romm (1960–2026, US, Nh); The Hype about Hydrogen; Hell and High Water; Straight Up
- Elihu Root (1845–1937, US, Po/Lw)
- Jonathan F.P. Rose (born 1952, US, B/Nh)
- Tricia Rose (born 1962, US, S/Mu); Black Noise: Rap Music and Black Culture in Contemporary America
- Alfred Rosenberg (1893–1946, Germany, Po); The Myth of the Twentieth Century
- Franz Rosenthal (1914–2003, Germany/US, R/L)
- Radu Rosetti (1853–1926, Romania, Ag/Po)
- Anna Rosmus (born 1960, Germany/US, H/Po)
- Janet Ross (1842–1927, England/Italy, H/C)
- William Michael Rossetti (1829–1919, England, Fi/Bg)
- Eucharius Rösslin (c. 1470–1526, Germany, M)
- Yechezkel Roth (living, Palestine/US, R)
- M. A. Rothman (living, US)
- David Mayer de Rothschild (England, Nh)
- Jean-Jacques Rousseau (1712–1778, Geneva/France, Ph/Ed); Emile, or On Education
- Ettie Rout (1877–1936, New Zealand/France, M/Po)
- Carlo Rovelli (born 1956, Italy/France, N/Ph); Seven Brief Lessons on Physics
- Barun Roy (born 1977, India, J) in English
- Sergio Rubin (living, Argentina, J/Bg); El Jesuita
- Ulinka Rublack (living, Germany/England, H) in English
- William Ruddiman (living, US, Nh); Plows, Plagues, and Petroleum
- Kathy Rudy (born 1956, US, R)
- Anneli Rufus (living, US, J)
- Gaius Musonius Rufus (1st c. AD, Ancient Rome, Ph)
- Evelyn Ruggles-Brise (1857–1935, Cr/S); The English Prison System
- Ann Rule (1931–2015, US, Cr)
- Alexander Russell (c. 1715–1768, Scotland/England, M/Nh)
- Bertrand Russell (1872–1970, England/Wales, Ph); The Problems of Philosophy
- Charles Taze Russell (1852–1916, US, R); Studies in the Scriptures
- Tim Russert (1950–2008, US, J/Lw)
- Bayard Rustin (1912–1987, US, S/Po)
- Jan van Ruusbroec (1293 or 1294 – 1381, Netherlands, R) in Middle Dutch
- Cornelius Ryan (1920–1974, Ireland/England, J/H); The Longest Day
- John Ryland (1753–1825, England, R)
- Gilbert Ryle (1900–1976, England, Ph); The Concept of Mind
- Thomas Rymer (c. 1643–1713, England, Lc/Po)

== S ==
- Nawal El Saadawi (1931–2021, Egypt, S/F)
- Henry Sacheverell (1674–1724, England, Po/R)
- Oliver Sacks (1933–2015, England/US, N)
- Vita Sackville-West (1892–1962, England, S/G)
- Carl Sagan (1934–1996, US, N)
- Lorna Sage (1943–2001, England, Lc/F); Bad Blood
- Antoine de Saint-Exupéry (1900–1944, France, J/T); Wind, Sand and Stars
- Louis Claude de Saint-Martin (1743–1803, France, Ph)
- Charles-Irénée Castel de Saint-Pierre (1658–1743, France, Po)
- Grégoire de Saint-Vincent (1584–1667, County of Flanders, Ma) in Latin
- János Sajnovics (1733–1785, Hungary, L) in Latin and Hungarian
- Ango Sakaguchi (坂口安吾, 1906–1955, Japan, S/Po)
- Kirkpatrick Sale (born 1937, US, Po/Nh)
- Nathanael Salmon (1675–1742, England, H/T)
- William Salmon (1644–1713, England, M)
- Curt Sampson (born 1952, US, J)
- William Sandys (England, 1792–1874, Mu/H)
- Marino Sanuto (1260–1338, Italy, T) in Latin
- Marino Sanuto (Sanudo, 1466–1536, Italy, H)
- Edward Sapir (1884–1939, US, L)
- Francisca Sarasate (1853–1922, Spain, Bg)
- Jadunath Sarkar (1870–1958, India, H); History of Aurangzib
- Jean-Paul Sartre (1905–1980, France, Ph/Lc); Being and Nothingness
- Ineko Sata (佐多稲子, 1904–1998, Japan, Lc/Po)
- Kailash Satyarthi (born 1954, India, S/Po)
- Henriette Sauret (1890–1976, France, F/Po)
- Ferdinand de Saussure (1857–1913, Switzerland, L) in French
- Vinayak Damodar Savarkar (1883–1966, India, H/Ph); The Indian War of Independence
- George Savile, 1st Marquess of Halifax (1633–1695, England, Po)
- Ruth Sawyer (1880–1970, US, E)
- Saxo Grammaticus (c. 1160 – c. 1220, Denmark, H/R) in Latin
- Dorothy L. Sayers (1893–1957, England, R/Ed)
- Frank Sayers (1763–1817, England, P)
- Michael J. Saylor (born 1965, US, B/I); The Mobile Wave
- Charles Scarborough (1615–1694, England, M/Ma)
- Jerry Schad (1949–2011, US, T)
- Pierre Schaeffer (1910–1995, France, M); In Search of a Concrete Music
- R. Murray Schafer (1933–2021, Canada, N/Nh)
- Simon Schama (born 1945, England, H/J); Rough Crossings
- Hermann Scheer (1944–2010, Germany, Po/Nh); Energy Autonomy
- Paul Scheerbart (1863–1915, Germany, A)
- Jonathan Schell (1943–2014, US, Af); The Gift of Time: The Case for Abolishing Nuclear Weapons Now
- Samuel Shellabarger ((1888–1954, US, P)
- Friedrich Wilhelm Joseph Schelling (1775–1854, Germany, Ph)
- Auden Schendler (living, US, Nh/B)
- Mary Anne Schimmelpenninck (1778–1856, England, Po/T)
- August Wilhelm Schlegel (1767–1845, Germany, Ph)
- Arthur M. Schlesinger Jr. (1917–2007, US, H/S); A Thousand Days
- Arthur M. Schlesinger Sr. (1888–1965, US, H)
- Paul Schneider (born 1962, US)
- Flora Rheta Schreiber (1918–1988, US); Sybil
- Olive Schreiner (1855–1920, South Africa, S/Po)
- Hermann Schultz (1836–1903, Germany, R)
- E. F. Schumacher (1911–1977, Germany/England, E/Ph); Small Is Beautiful
- Edward Scobie (1918–1996, Dominica, J/H)
- Caroline Lucy Scott (1784–1857, England, R)
- Hardiman Scott (1920–1999, England, Po)
- J. Michael Scott (born 1941, US, Nh)
- John Scott (1731–1783, England, G/S)
- Mary McKay Scott (1851–1932, Canada, T)
- Thomas Scott (1747–1821, England)
- Anne Scott-James (1913–2009, England, J/G)
- Roger Scruton (1944–2020, England, Ph)
- Elizabeth Clare Scurfield (born 1950, England, L/Ed)
- Andrea Seabrook (born 1974, US, J)
- Jessie L. Seal (1864–1946, US, G)
- David Sedaris (born 1956, US, J); Naked
- Stephen Sedley (born 1939, England, Lw/Po)
- John Robert Seeley (1834–1895, England, H)
- Marta Segarra (born 1963, Spain, F/L/S)
- Sei Shōnagon (清少納言, c. 966–1017/1025, Japan, S/Bg)
- W. C. Sellar (1898–1951, Scotland/England, H); 1066 and All That (co-author with R. J. Yeatman)
- Nachman Seltzer (born 1976, Israel, Bg/J/R)
- Seneca the Elder (54 BC – c. 39 AD, Ancient Rome, Ph/L)
- Seneca the Younger (Lucius Annaeus Seneca, c. 4 BC – AD 65, Ancient Rome, Ph/Lc)
- Julia Rice Seney (1853-1915, US, T)
- Perla Serfaty (born 1944, Morocco/France/Canada, S)
- Emilia Serrano y García (1834–1923, Spain, T)
- Olivier de Serres (1539–1619, France, Ag)
- Julia Seton (1862–1950, US, R)
- Elizabeth Sewell (1919–2001, US, Lc)
- Elizabeth Missing Sewell (1815–1906, England, R/Ed)
- Miranda Seymour (born 1948, England, Lc/Bg)
- Ruchoma Shain (1914–2013, US, R/Bg)
- Granville Sharp (1735–1813, England, Po/S)
- Jane Sharp (fl. mid–17th c., England, M)
- William Shawcross (born 1946, England, S/Bg)
- Philip Sherrard (1922–1995, England, Lc/Nh)
- David Shipman (1932–1996, England, Bg/D)
- Suzanne Strempek Shea (living, US, Bg)
- Ralph Sheldon (1623–1684, England, H)
- Peter Sherwood (born 1948, England/US, L)
- Ryōtarō Shiba (司馬遼太郎, 1923–1996, Japan, J/H)
- Nanami Shiono (塩野七生, born 1937, Japan, H)
- Vandana Shiva (born 1952, India, Nh)
- Stanislav Edward Shmelev (living, England, Ec/Nh)
- Arun Shourie (born 1941, India, E/Po); Eminent Historians
- Kalim Siddiqui (1931–1996, Pakistan/England, R)
- Mona L. Siegel (living person, US, H)
- Dennis Silk (1931–2019, England, Sp/Lc)
- Brendan Simms (born 1967, Ireland/England, Po)
- Julian Simon (1932–1998, US, B/Ec); The Ultimate Resource
- Simplicius of Cilicia (c. 490 AD – c. 560, Ancient Greece, Ph) in Latin
- Matt Simpson (1936–2009, England, Lc)
- George Sinclair (1787–1834, Scotland/England, G)
- Upton Sinclair (1878–1968, US, S/M)
- Fred Singer (1924–2020, US, N/Nh)
- Alfred Percy Sinnett (1840–1921, England/India, R/Ph); Esoteric Buddhism
- Ellen Johnson Sirleaf (born 1938, Liberia, Po)
- Edith Sitwell (1887–1964, England, Bg/Lc)
- Sacheverell Sitwell (1897–1988, England, Fi/M)
- Robert Skidelsky (born 1939, England, E)
- Alexander Skutch (1904–2004, US, Nh/Ph)
- Eugene Sledge (1923–2001, US, Mi/N)
- Peter Sloterdijk (born 1947, Germany, Ph/J); Critique of Cynical Reason
- William Smellie (1740–1795, Scotland, P); Encyclopædia Britannica
- Vaclav Smil (born 1943, Canada, Nh/E)
- Samuel Smiles (1812–1904, Scotland/England, S/Po)
- Jane Smiley (born 1949), US, Bg/C); The Man Who Invented The Computer
- Adam Smith (1723–1790, Scotland, E/Ph); The Wealth of Nations
- Charlotte Fell Smith (1851–1937, England, H/Bg)
- Jean Edward Smith (1932–2019, US, E/Bg)
- Joseph Smith (1805–1844, US, R); Book of Mormon
- Melvyn Smith (born 1955, H); An Illustrated History of the Space Shuttle
- Rick Smith (born 1968, Canada, Nh)
- Sydney Smith (1771–1845, England/Scotland, R/J)
- Ted Smith (born 1945, US, B/Nh)
- William Smith (1756–1835, England, S/Po)
- William Smith (1769–1839, England, N)
- William Jardine Smith (1834–1884, Australia, J)
- Zadie Smith (born 1975, England/US, Lc)
- Aleksander Smolar (born 1940, Poland, Po/S)
- Tobias Smollett (1721–1771, Scotland, Bg)
- Gary Snyder (1930–2019, US, Nh)
- Yan-kit So (1933–2001, Hong Kong/England, C)
- Chunghee Sarah Soh (living, US, H/Po); The Comfort Women
- Hedvig Sohlberg (1858-1937, Finland, Ed)
- Sara Solá de Castellanos (1890-?, Argentina, Bg, H)
- Lawrence Solomon (born 1948, Canada, Nh); The Deniers
- Someshvara III (reigned 1127–1138, India, P) in Sanskrit
- David A. Sonnenfeld (born 1953, US, S/Nh)
- Susan Sontag (1933–2004, US, S/Aa); On Photography
- Cornelia Sorabji (1866–1954, India/England, Lw/S)
- Robert South (1634–1716, England, R)
- Joanna Southcott (1750–1814, England, R/S)
- Walter Shaw Sparrow (1862–1940, Wales/England, Aa/Fi)
- Clara E. Speight-Humberston (1862–1936, Canada, M/R/S)
- E. Lee Spence (born 1947, US, Ar)
- Ruth Elizabeth Spence (1890-1982, Canada, H)
- Thomas Spence (1750–1814, England, Po/S)
- Dorcas James Spencer (1841–1933, United States, S)
- Oswald Spengler (1880–1936, Germany, H/Ph); The Decline of the West
- James Gustave Speth (born 1942, US, Nh/Lw); Red Sky at Morning
- Thomas Sprat (1635–1713, England, R)
- Piero Sraffa (1898–1983, Italy/England, E)
- M. N. Srinivas (1916–1999, India, S); The Remembered Village
- Jan Jansz de Jonge Stampioen (1610–1653, Netherlands, Ma)
- Philip Stanhope, 5th Earl Stanhope (1805–1875, England, H)
- Arthur Penrhyn Stanley (1815–1881, England, R/H)
- Diane Stanley (born 1943, US, E/Bg); Joan of Arc
- Johann August von Starck (1741–1816, Germany, R)
- Mariana Starke (1761/62–1838, England, T)
- David Starkey (born 1945, England, H/J)
- Betsey Ann Stearns (1830–1914, US, Aa/Fa)
- John Gabriel Stedman (1744–1797, Surinam/England, Mi)
- Richard Steele (1672–1729, Ireland/England, J/Po)
- Ben Stein (born 1944, US, J)
- John Steinbeck (1902–1968, US, S); Travels with Charley
- Sandra Steingraber (born 1959, US, N/Nh)
- Rudolf Steiner (1861–1925, Austria/Germany, R/Ed)
- James Francis Stephens (1792–1952, England, Nh/P)
- Robert Stevens (1933–2021, England, Lw)
- Charles Stevenson (1908–1979, US, Ph); Ethics and Language
- Tom Stevenson (born 1941, England, W)
- A. T. Q. Stewart (1929–2010, Northern Ireland, H/Po)
- Jane Agnes Stewart (1860–1944, US, Ed/F/R/S)
- Jon Stewart (born 1962, US, J/Po); America (The Book)
- Rory Stewart (born 1973, Scotland/England, Po/Cr)
- George Stigler (1911–1991, US, E)
- Joseph Stiglitz (born 1943, US, E/Po); The Great Divide: Unequal Societies and What We Can Do About Them
- Bill Stilwell (living, Canada, Nh)
- Max Stirner (1806–1856, Germany, Ph)
- Ellen M. Stone (1846–1927, US, R/T)
- Thomas H. Stoner Jr. (born 1960, US, B/Nh)
- Charlotte Carmichael Stopes (1840–1929, Scotland/England, Lc/F)
- Marie Stopes (1880–1958, England, N/F); Married Love
- Edward Stourton (born 1957, England, J)
- Lytton Strachey (1880–1932, England, Bg)
- Hamon le Strange (1583–1654, England, H/R)
- Agnes Strickland (1796–1874, England, H)
- Flora E. Strout (1867–1962, US, S)
- William Stukeley (1687–1765, England, Ar)
- Kenchō Suematsu (末松謙澄, 1855–1920, Japan, P) in Japanese and English
- Suetonius (Gaius Suetonius Tranquillus, AD 69 – post-122, Ancient Rome, H); De vita Caesarum
- Francis Stoughton Sullivan (1715–1766, Ireland, Lw)
- Joseph Sturge (1793–1859, England, S/Po)
- Kate Summerscale (born 1965, England, J/Cr)
- Alexander Süsskind of Grodno (died 1794, Russia, R) in Hebrew
- András Sütő (1927–2006, Romania, Po/L) in Hungarian
- Viktor Suvorov (born 1947, Soviet Union/England, Mi/H) in Russian and English
- David Suzuki (born 1936, Canada, Nh)
- Annie S. Swan (1859–1943, Scotland, Po/F)
- Donald Swann (1923–1994, England, Mu/S)
- Ram Swarup (1920–1998, India, R)
- Emanuel Swedenborg (1688–1772, Sweden, R/Ph)
- John Swete (1752–1821, England, H/T)
- Joe Swift (born 1965, England, G/J)
- Jonathan Swift (1667–1745, Ireland/England, P); A Tale of a Tub
- Susie Forrest Swift (1862–1916, United States/England, R)
- Percy Sykes (1867–1945, England, H/Bg)
- Ronald Syme (1903–1989, New Zealand/England, H); The Roman Revolution
- John Addington Symonds (1840–1893, England, Lc)
- Arthur Symons (1865–1945, England, Lc/J); The Symbolist Movement in Literature
- István Szamosközy (1570–1612, Hungary, H)
- Małgorzata Szejnert (living, Poland, J)
- Antal Szerb (1901–1945, Hungary, Lc)

== T ==
- Tacitus (c. 56 AD – c. 120, Ancient Rome, Po/H); Histories
- Ukichi Taguchi (田口卯吉, 1850–1905, Japan, H/E)
- Mutsuo Takahashi (高橋睦郎, born 1937, Japan, S)
- Michio Takeyama (竹山道雄, 1903–1984, Japan, Lc)
- Catherine Talbot (1721–1770, England, J)
- John Tallmadge (living, US, Nh)
- Samuel A. Tannenbaum (1874–1948, Hungary/US, Lc)
- Heather Tanner (1903–1993, England, Nh/S)
- Barbara Tate (1927–2009, England, S/F)
- R. H. Tawney (1880–1962, England, H/R); Religion and the Rise of Capitalism
- A. J. P. Taylor (1906–1990, England, H); The Origins of the Second World War
- Brook Taylor (1685–1731, England, Ma/Mu)
- F. Sherwood Taylor (1897–1956, England, N/H)
- Jeremy Taylor (1613–1667, England, R)
- Philip Meadows Taylor (1808–1876, England/India, H/R)
- Sarah McFarland Taylor (living, US, Nh)
- William Taylor (1765–1836, England, L/Po)
- Wilhelm Abraham Teller (1734–1804, Germany, R)
- William Temple (1628–1699, England, Po/P)
- Eugenia Tenenbaum (born 1996, Spain, F/H)
- Torahiko Terada (寺田寅彦, 1878–1935, Japan, P)
- Teresa of Ávila (1515–1582, Spain, R); El Castillo Interior
- Mary Virginia Terhune (Marion Harland, 1830–1922, US, C)
- Tertullian (AD c. 155 – c. 240, Roman Africa, R)
- Peter Tertzakian (born 1961, Canada, Ec/Nh)
- Paranjoy Guha Thakurta (born 1955, India, J/Nh)
- Françoise Thébaud (born 1952, France, H/F)
- John Thelwall (1764–1834, England, Po/L)
- Thérèse of Lisieux (1873–1897, France, R)
- Wilfred Thesiger (1910–2003, England/Kenya, T); Arabian Sands
- Philip Thicknesse (1719–1792, England, T)
- Edward J. Thomas (1869–1958, England, R)
- Keith Thomas (born 1933, Wales/England); Man and the Natural World
- Lowell Thomas (1892–1981, US, J/T)
- D'Arcy Wentworth Thompson (1860–1948, Scotland, N/Ma); On Growth and Form
- Dorothy Thompson (1923–2011, England, H)
- E. P. Thompson (1924–1993, England, H); The Making of the English Working Class
- Edward Roffe Thompson (1891–1973, England, Bg/Po)
- Henry Thompson (1820–1904, England, M/P)
- Hunter S. Thompson (1937–2005, US, S/Cr); Hell's Angels: The Strange and Terrible Saga of the Outlaw Motorcycle Gangs
- Neal Thompson (living, US, J)
- William Thompson (1775–1833, Ireland, Ph/Po)
- A. A. Thomson (1894–1968, England, Sp/T)
- Henry David Thoreau (1817–1862, US, S); Civil Disobedience
- Hester Thrale (1741–1821, England, Bg); Anecdotes of the Late Samuel Johnson
- Lancelot Threlkeld (1788–1859, Australia, L); An Australian Grammar
- Colin Thubron (born 1939, England, T); In Siberia
- Lauritz de Thurah (1706–1759, Denmark, A)
- Ludwig Tieck (1773–1853, Germany, Lc)
- Joan Tighe (1922–2014, Ireland, Fa/J)
- Mary Wilder Tileston (1843–1934, US, Bg)
- Paul Tillich (1886–1965, Germany/US, R/Ph)
- Stella Tillyard (born 1957, England, H)
- Alan Titchmarsh (born 1949, England, G)
- Alexis de Tocqueville (1805–1859, France, Po/H)
- Deborah Todd (living, US, J)
- Maria Todorova (born 1949, Bulgaria, H)
- Alvin Toffler (1928–2016, US, B/I)
- Alice B. Toklas (1877–1967, US/France, C); The Alice B. Toklas Cookbook
- John Toland (1670–1722, Scotland/England, R); Christianity not Mysterious
- Ferenc Toldy (1805–1875, Hungary, Lc) in Hungarian and German
- Lynn Toler (1928–2016, US, Lw)
- Leo Tolstoy (1828–1910, Russia, Bg/R); What Is to Be Done?
- Claire Tomalin (born 1933, England, Bg/J)
- John Horne Tooke (1736–1812, England, Po/L)
- Thomas Toughill (living, Scotland/Gibraltar, J)
- William Treloar (1843–1923, England, H/Po)
- G. M. Trevelyan (1876–1962, England, H)
- Sir Frederick Treves, 1st Baronet (1853–1923, England, M/T)
- Hugh Trevor-Roper (1914–2003, England, H)
- Lionel Trilling (1905–1975, US, Lc/E)
- Ralph Waldo Trine (1866–1958, US, R/S)
- Emil Trinkler (1896–1931, Germany, Nh/T)
- Gian Giorgio Trissino (1478–1550, Italy, L/S)
- Ernst Troeltsch (1865–1923, Germany, R)
- Gnaeus Pompeius Trogus (1st century AD, Ancient Rome, H)
- Frances Milton Trollope (1779–1863, England, T/S); Domestic Manners of the Americans
- Théodore Tronchin (1582–1657, Geneva, R/L)
- J. Maarten Troost (born 1969, Netherlands, T); Getting Stoned with Savages
- Margaret Trudeau (born 1948, Canada, J/Ps)
- D. Elton Trueblood (1900–1994, US, Po/R)
- Shōyō Tsubouchi (坪内 逍遥, 1859–1935, Japan, Lc/E)
- Tsuda Umeko (津田梅子, 1864–1929, Japan, Ed)
- Jun Tsuji, later Ryūkitsu Mizushima (辻潤, 1884–1944, Japan, S/Lc)
- Ryōsen Tsunashima (綱島梁川, 1873–1907, Japan, Ph/R)
- Barbara W. Tuchman (1912–1989, US, H); The Guns of August
- Francis Fox Tuckett (1834–1913, England, Sp)
- Barbara Tudek (1952–2019, Poland, N)
- Ibn Tufail (c. 1105–1185, Andalusia/Marrakesh, P) in Arabic
- Daniel Hack Tuke (1827–1895, England, M)
- Samuel Tuke (1784–1857, England, M)
- William Tuke (1732–1822, England, M/S)
- Martin Farquhar Tupper (1810–1889, England, Lc)
- Colin Turnbull (1924–1994, England/US, S/M); The Forest People
- Frederick Jackson Turner (1861–1932, US, H); The Significance of the Frontier in American History
- William Turner (1509/10–1568, N/R)
- Emma Rood Tuttle (1839–1916, US, R)
- Desmond Tutu (1931–2021, South Africa, R/Po)
- Edward Burnett Tylor (1832–1917, England, Pr)
- Hayyim Tyrer (died 1813, Palestine, R) in Hebrew
- Edward Tyson (1651–1708, England, N); Orang-Outang, sive Homo Sylvestris: or, the Anatomy of a Pygmie Compared with that of a Monkey, an Ape, and a Man
- Neil DeGrasse Tyson (born 1958, US, N)
- William Tytler (1711–1792, Scotland, H/Lc)

== U ==
- Kanzō Uchimura (内村鑑三, 1861–1930, Japan, R)
- Miklós Udvardy (1919–1998, Hungary/US, Nh)
- Akinari Ueda (上田秋成, 1734–1809, Japan, Lc/R)
- Makoto Ueda (植田実, born 1935, Japan, A)
- Stefania Ulanowska (Latvia, L)
- Evelyn Underhill (1875–1941, England, R)
- John Upton (1707–1760, England, Lc)
- Andrew Ure (1778–1857, Scotland/England, M/B)
- Thomas Urquhart (1611–1660, Scotland, M/L)
- Sumayya Usmani (fl. 2023, Scotland, C)
- James Ussher (1581–1656, Ireland, R); Annales veteris testamenti, a prima mundi origine deducti in Latin
- Yoshimi Usui (臼井 吉見, 1905–1987, Japan, Lc)
- Freda Utley (1898–1978, England/US, Po/H)
- Alison Uttley (1884–1976, England, T/E)

== V ==
- Andrew Vachss (1942–2021, US, Ed/S)
- Gertrude Vaile (1878–1954, US, S)
- Paul Valéry (1871–1945, France, Po/Lc)
- Henrik Valeur (born 1966, Denmark, A)
- Imre Vallyon (born 1940, Hungary/New Zealand, R/S) in English
- Miklós Vámos (born 1950, Hungary, J)
- Charles Vancouver (c. 1756 – c. 1815, England/US, Ag)
- George Vancouver (1757–1798, England, T)
- Martha Van Marter (1839–1931, US, R)
- Michael J. Varhola (born 1966, US, H/Sp)
- Robert Vaughan (1795–1868, England, R/J)
- Thomas Vaughan (1621–1666, Wales/England, R) in English
- Adelma Vay (1840–1925, Galicia/Hungary, R) in German
- Thorstein Veblen (1857–1929, Norway/US, Ec) in English
- Lizzie Velásquez (born 1989, US, S/M)
- Josef Velek (1939–1990, Czechoslovakia, Nh)
- Immanuel Velikovsky (1895–1979, Russia/US, J/H); Worlds in Collision
- William Vickrey (1914–1996, US, E)
- Félix Vicq-d'Azyr (1748–1794, France, M/N)
- Edgar Vincent (1857–1941, England, Po/Fi)
- Elfrida Vipont (1902–1992, England, R)
- Orderic Vitalis (1075 – c. 1142, England, H) in Latin
- Vitruvius (c. 80–70 BC – post-15 BC, Ancient Rome, A)
- Ernest Alfred Vizetelly (1853–1922, England, J/Mi)
- Ivan Vladislavić (born 1957, South Africa, J); Portrait with Keys
- Gillian Vogelsang-Eastwood (born 1957, Netherlands, Fa/H)
- Voltaire (1694–1778, France, H/Ph); Essai sur les mœurs et l'esprit des nations

== W ==
- Edmund de Waal (born 1964, England, Aa/P); The Hare with Amber Eyes
- Frans de Waal (1948–2024, Netherlands, Aa); The Ape and the Sushi Master
- Constance Wachtmeister (1838–1910, Sweden/England, R)
- Helen Waddell (1889–1965, Northern Ireland/England, H/Lc); The Wandering Scholars
- Lucas Janszoon Waghenaer (1533/34–1606, Netherlands, T)
- John Wain (1925–1994, England, Lc)
- Alfred Wainwright (1907–1991, England, T)
- A. E. Waite (1857–1942, England, R); The Book of Ceremonial Magic
- Terry Waite (born 1939, England, Bg/T)
- Priscilla Wakefield (1751–1832, England, S/F)
- George Waldron (1690 – c. 1730, England, T)
- Rosa Kershaw Walker (1840s–1909, US, Bg, T)
- Doreen Wallace (1897–1989, England, Ag/G)
- Edna Walling (1895–1973, Australia, G)
- Horace Walpole (1717–1797, England, Lc/P)
- Hugh Walpole (1884–1941, England, Bg)
- Neale Donald Walsch (born 1943, US, R)
- Izaak Walton (c. 1593–1683, England, Nh/Sp); The Compleat Angler
- Ned Ward (1667–1731, England, T); The London Spy
- James Ware (1594–1666, Ireland, H)
- Elijah Waring (1787–1857, Wales, Po)
- Mary Warnock, Baroness Warnock (1924–2019, England, Ph)
- Kevin Warwick (born 1954, England, N/I); March of the Machines
- Marion Foster Washburne (1863-1944, US, Ed)
- Anne Nasimiyu Wasike (died 2018, Uganda, Ed)
- Arthur Waskow (born 1933, US, Po/R)
- Xavier Waterkeyn (born 1965, Australia, Cr)
- John Waters (born 1955, Ireland, J)
- Alfred Watkins (1855–1935, England, Ar/H); The Old Straight Track
- Robert Spence Watson (1837–1911, England, Po/S)
- Rosamund Marriott Watson (1860–1911, England, G/Nh)
- Evelyn Waugh (1903–1966, England, Bg/T)
- John C. Waugh (born 1929, US, J/H)
- Spencer R. Weart (born 1942, US, N)
- Beatrice Webb (1858–1943, England, Po)
- Sidney Webb (1859–1947, England, Po)
- Max Weber (1864–1920, Germany, H/P); The Protestant Ethic and the Spirit of Capitalism
- Simone Weil (1909–1943, France, Ph/Po); The Need for Roots
- Linda Weintraub (living, US, Fi/S)
- Alan Weisman (born 1947, US, J/S); The World Without Us
- Ernst Ulrich von Weizsäcker (born 1939, Germany, N/Po)
- H. G. Wells (1866–1946, England, P); The Outline of History
- Adam Werbach (born 1973, US, Nh/B)
- Léon Werth (1878–1955, France, Fi)
- John Wesley (1703–1791, England, R)
- Samuel Wesley (1662–1735, England, R)
- Tom Wessels (born 1951, US, Nh)
- Rebecca West (1892–1983, Scotland/England, P/T); Black Lamb and Grey Falcon
- William West (c. 1548–1598, England, Lw)
- Joyce Wethered (1901–1997, England, Sp/G)
- Johann Weyer (1515–1588, Netherlands, M/R); De praestigiis daemonum
- Rex Weyler (born 1947, US, J/R)
- Edith Wharton (1862–1937, US, Aa); The Decoration of Houses
- Mary Louisa Whately (1824–1889, England, R/T)
- Richard Whately (1787–1863, England/Ireland, R/E)
- Francis Wheen (born 1957, England, J)
- William Whewell (1794–1866, England, P)
- Benjamin Whichcote (1609–1683, England, R)
- Andrew Dickson White (1832–1918, US, E/Po); A History of the Warfare of Science with Theology in Christendom
- Dorothy White (c. 1630–1686, England, R)
- Florence White (1863–1940, England, C); Good Things in England
- Michael White (1959–2018, England/Australia, N)
- Alfred North Whitehead (1861–1947, England/US, M); Principia Mathematica
- Opal Whiteley (1897–1992, US/England, Nh)
- Alan Whiticker (born 1958, Australia, H/Cr)
- John Greenleaf Whittier (1807–1892, US, S/R)
- Richard Whittington-Egan (1924–2016, England, Cr)
- Douglas Whynott (born 1950, US, J)
- William Foote Whyte (1914–2000, US, S/Cr); Street Corner Society
- Carl Wickland (1861–1945, Sweden/US, Ps)
- Knut Wicksell (1851–1926, Sweden, E)
- Simon Wiesenthal (1908–2005, US, Cr/S)
- John Wilbur (1774–1856, US, R)
- Maud Wilde (1880–1965, US, Ed)
- Clint Wilder (living, US, J/B)
- Samuel Wilderspin (1791–1866, England, E)
- William Henry Wilkins (1860–1905, Po)
- Bruce Wilkinson (living, US, R); The Prayer of Jabez
- William of Tyre (c. 1130–1186, Kingdom of Jerusalem, R/H) in Latin
- Eric Williams (1911–1981, Trinidad and Tobago, Po/H)
- Frederick Smeeton Williams (1829–1886, England, Tr)
- Jody Williams (born 1950, US, Po/F)
- Margaret Hicks Williams (1899–1972, US, Po)
- Raymond Williams (1921–1988, Wales/England, S/Po); Culture and Society
- Rheinallt Nantlais Williams (1911–1993, Wales, R)
- Roger Williams (1603–1683, US, R/Po); A Key into the Language of America
- Rowan Williams (born 1950, Wales/England, R/S)
- Waldo Williams (1904–1971, Wales, Po) in Welsh and English
- Richard T. Williamson (born 1958, US, B)
- Browne Willis (1682–1760, England, H/R)
- Francis Willughby (1635–1672, England, Nh/Sp); De Historia piscium in Latin
- A. N. Wilson (born 1950, England, Bg/J)
- Arthur Wilson (1595–1652, England, H)
- Brandon Wilson (born 1953, US, T)
- E. O. Wilson (1929–2021, US, N/Nh)
- Edmund Wilson (1895–1972, US S/Lc); To the Finland Station
- Ella B. Ensor Wilson (1838–1913, US, N, S)
- Henry Wilson (1812–1875, US, H/S); History of the Rise and Fall of the Slave Power in America
- Jane Wilson-Howarth (born 1954, England, M/T)
- Jean Moorcroft Wilson (born 1941, England, Bg)
- Kathy Y. Wilson (died 2022, US, J, S)
- William K. Wimsatt (1907–1975, US, Lc)
- Johann Joachim Winckelmann (1717–1768, Germany/Italy, Fi/Ar)
- William Windham Sr. (1717–1761, Geneva/England, T/Mi)
- Charles F. Winslow (1811–1877, US, M/T)
- Forbes Benignus Winslow (1810–1874, England, Ps/Cr)
- Gerrard Winstanley (1609–1676, England, Po/R); The Law of Freedom in a Platform
- Annie Steger Winston (1862–1927, US, Ed)
- William James Wintle (1861–1934, England, J/Cr)
- T. P. Wiseman (born 1940, England, H)
- Owen Wister (1860–1938, US, H/Bg); Roosevelt: The Story of a Friendship
- Ludwig Wittgenstein (1889–1951, Austrian Empire/England, Ph); Tractatus Logico-Philosophicus
- Carl Gottfried Woide (1725–1790, Germany/England, L/R) in Latin
- Paula Wolfert (born 1938, US, C)
- Frances Garnet Wolseley (1872–1936, England, G)
- Anthony Wood (1632–1695, England, H)
- Julia A. Wood (1840–1927, US, R, T)
- Cecil Woodham-Smith (1896–1977, England, H); The Great Hunger: Ireland 1845–1849
- Barbara Woodhouse (1910–1988, England, J)
- Robert Woodhouse (1773–1827, England, Ma)
- Caroline M. Clark Woodward (1840–1924, US, S)
- John Woodward (naturalist) (1665–1728, England, Nh)
- Benjamin Woolley (living, England, J)
- Barbara Wootton, Baroness Wootton of Abinger (1897–1988, England, S/Cr)
- Chandos Wren-Hoskyns (1812–1876, England, Ag/Po)
- Christian Guthrie Wright (1844–1907, Scotland, F/C)
- Wulfstan of Hedeby (later 9th c., England or Germany, T)
- Garrison W. Wynn (living, US, J/B)

== Y ==
- Dov Yaffe (1928–2017, Israel, R)
- Sokō Yamaga (山鹿素行, 1622–1685, Japan, Ph)
- Hiroo Yamagata (山形浩生, born 1964, Japan, I/E)
- Bruce Yandle (born 1933, US, Nh)
- Moy Yat (1938–2001, China, Sp)
- Frances Yates (1899–1981, England, H); The Art of Memory
- R. J. Yeatman (1897–1968, England, H); 1066 and All That (co-author with W. C. Sellar)
- Daniel Yergin (born 1947, US, H/Ec); The Prize: The Epic Quest for Oil, Money, and Power
- James Yonge (1646/1647–1721, England, Bg/M)
- Annie Henrietta Yorke (1844-1926, UK, R)
- Philip Yorke (1743–1804, Wales/England, H)
- Akiko Yosano (与謝野晶子, 1878–1942, Japan, F/S)
- Hidekazu Yoshida (吉田秀和, 1913–2012, Japan, Mu/Lc)
- Kenkō Yoshida (吉田兼好, 1284–1350, Japan, Lc/R); Tsurezuregusa
- Takaaki Yoshimoto (吉本隆明, 1924–2012, Japan, Lc/Ph)
- Arthur Young (1693–1759, England, R)
- Arthur Young (1741–1820, England, Ag/T)
- Edward Young (1683–1735, England, R)
- Marianne Young (1811 – 1897) writer on British India and Tuscany
- Thomas Young (1773–1829, England, P)
- Malala Yousafzai (born 1997, Pakistan, F)
- Miri Yu (柳美里, born 1968, Japan, P)
- Sir Henry Yule (1820–1889, Scotland/India, L/T); Hobson-Jobson
- Udny Yule (1871–1951, Scotland/India, M/N)
- Muhammad Yunus (born 1940, Bangladesh, Ec/Po)

== Z ==
- Oliver Zangwill (1913–1987, England, Ps)
- Peter Wessel Zapffe (1899–1990, Norway, Ph); The Last Messiah
- Paul Zarifopol (1874–1934, Romania, Lc/S)
- Leszek Zasztowt (born 1953, Poland, H)
- Motokiyo Zeami (世阿弥元清, c. 1363 – c. 1443, Japan, Lc)
- Ozzie Zehner (living, US, Nh); Green Illusions: The Dirty Secrets of Clean Energy and the Future of Environmentalism
- Konni Zilliacus (1894–1967, England, Po)
- Alfred Eckhard Zimmern (1879–1957, England, H/Po)
- Alice Zimmern (1855–1939, England, E/H)
- Helen Zimmern (1846–1934, England/Italy, Lc)
- János Zsámboky (1531–1584, Hungary, M/Ph) in Latin
- Stefan Zweig (1881–1942, Austria, Bg/H); Marie Antoinette: The Portrait of an Average Woman
- Samuel Marinus Zwemer (1867–1952, US, R/T)

== See also ==
- List of biographers
- List of critics
- List of essayists
- List of historians
- Lists of philosophers
- List of political authors
- List of non-fiction environmental writers
  - List of American non-fiction environmental writers
- Lists of writers
