= List of English writers (D–J) =

List of English writers lists writers in English, born or raised in England (or who lived in England for a lengthy period), who already have Wikipedia pages. References for the information here appear on the linked Wikipedia pages. The list is incomplete – please help to expand it by adding Wikipedia page-owning writers who have written extensively in any genre or field, including science and scholarship. Please follow the entry format. A seminal work added to a writer's entry should also have a Wikipedia page. This is a subsidiary to the List of English people. There are or should be similar lists of Irish, Scots, Welsh, Manx, Jersey, and Guernsey writers.

Abbreviations: AV = Authorized King James Version of the Bible, also as = also wrote/writes as, c. = circa; century, cc. = centuries; cleric = Anglican priest, fl. = floruit, RC = Roman Catholic, SF = science fiction, YA = young adult fiction

== D ==
- David Dabydeen (born 1955), novelist and critic
- Charlotte Dacre (wrote as Rosa Matilda, 1782–1841), novelist and poet
- Roald Dahl (1916–1990), novelist, children's writer and poet
- William Dakins (died 1607), scholar, AV translator and cleric
- Andrew Dalby (born 1947), writer
- Celia Dale (1912–2011), novelist and book reviewer
- Penny Dale (born 1954), children's writer and illustrator
- Thomas Dale (1797–1870), poet, theologian and cleric
- Robert Charles Dallas (1756–1824), writer and poet
- Anne Seymour Damer (1748–1828), novelist and sculptor
- William Dampier (1651–1715), travel writer and buccaneer
- William Danby (1752–1833), scholar and philosopher
- Clemence Dane (real name Winifred Ashton, 1888–1965), novelist and playwright
- Samuel Daniel (1562–1619), poet and historian
- William Barker Daniel (1754–1833), field sports writer and cleric
- Sarah Daniels (born 1957), playwright
- Alicia D'Anvers (1688–1725), poet
- Ella D'Arcy (c. 1856–1939), novelist and translator
- Bill Dare (living), scriptwriter, novelist and playwright
- F. J. Harvey Darton (1878–1936), children's literature historian and publisher
- Bernard Darwin (1876–1961), golf writer
- Charles Darwin (1809–1882), natural historian, On the Origin of Species
- Emma Darwin (born 1964), novelist
- Erasmus Darwin (1731–1802), natural historian and poet
- Florence Henrietta Darwin (1863/1864–1920), playwright
- Elizabeth Daryush (originally Bridges, 1887–1977), poet
- George Webbe Dasent (1817–1896), writer and translator
- Rana Dasgupta (born 1972), novelist
- William Davenant (1606–1668), poet and playwright
- Robert Davenport (fl. 1623–1639), playwright and poet
- Selina Davenport (1779–1859), novelist
- C. A. F. Rhys Davids (1857–1942), Buddhist scholar and translator
- Lionel Davidson (1922–2009), novelist
- Donald Davie (1922–1995), poet and critic
- Caitlin Davies (born 1964), novelist and journalist
- Hunter Davies (born 1936), writer and biographer
- Hugh Sykes Davies (1909–1984), poet and novelist
- John Davies (c. 1565–1618), poet and satirist
- John Davies (1569–1626), poet and lawyer
- Linda Davies (born 1963), novelist
- Paul B. Davies (living), writer and actor
- Peter Ho Davies (born 1966), writer
- John Davis or Davys (c. 1543–1605), writer and navigator
- Lindsey Davis (born 1949), novelist
- Ann Davison (1914–1992), travel writer
- Humphry Davy (1778–1829), writer and inventor
- Elizabeth Dawbarn (died 1839), writer on religion and child care
- Richard Dawkins (born 1941), science writer
- Coningsby Dawson (1883–1959), novelist, poet and soldier
- Jennifer Dawson (1929–2000), novelist
- Jill Dawson (living), poet, novelist and editor
- William James Dawson (1854–1928), poet and religious writer
- James Wentworth Day (1899–1983), countryside writer and broadcaster
- Jeffery Day (1896–1918), poet
- John Day (1574 – c. 1640), playwright, The Parliament of Bees
- Martin Day (born 1969), novelist and screenwriter
- Thomas Day (1748–1789), children's writer and educator
- Cecil Day-Lewis (1904–1972), Poet Laureate, translator and novelist
- Tamasin Day-Lewis (born 1953), food writer and broadcaster
- April De Angelis (born 1960), playwright
- Louis de Bernières (born 1954), novelist, Captain Corelli's Mandolin
- Alain de Botton (born 1969), writer, novelist and essayist
- Maria De Fleury (fl. 1773–1791), poet, hymnist and polemicist
- Guy de la Bédoyère (born 1957), historian and broadcaster
- Walter de la Mare (also as Walter Ramal, 1873–1956), poet and novelist
- Michael de Larrabeiti (1934–2008), novelist and travel writer
- William De Morgan (1839–1917), novelist and potter
- Thomas de Quincey (1785–1859), essayist and critic, Confessions of an English Opium-Eater
- Hugh de Selincourt (1878–1951), writer and journalist
- Aubrey de Sélincourt (1894–1962), classicist, translator and children's writer
- Lisa St Aubin de Terán (born 1953), novelist, poet and autobiographer
- Edward de Vere, earl of Oxford (1550–1604), playwright and poet
- William Frederick Deacon (1799–1844), writer and journalist
- Roger Deakin (1943–2006), countryside writer
- Louise Dean (living), novelist
- Nick Dear (born 1955), playwright and screenwriter
- Geoffrey Dearmer (1893–1996), poet
- Percy Dearmer, (1867–1936), reformer and cleric
- John Dee (1527–1608/1609), mathematician, occultist and political economist
- Denise Deegan (born 1952), novelist, screenwriter and playwright
- Warwick Deeping (1877–1950), novelist and story writer
- Daniel Defoe (c. 1659–1731), novelist and pamphleteer, Robinson Crusoe
- Paul Dehn (1912–1976), screenwriter and playwright
- Len Deighton (1929–2026), historian, cookery writer and novelist, The IPCRESS File
- Thomas Dekker (1572–1632), playwright
- E. M. Delafield (1890–1943), novelist
- Michael De-la-Noy (1934–2002), writer and journalist
- Mary Delany (born Mary Granville), (1700–1788), letter writer, artist and bluestocking
- R. F. Delderfield (1912–1972), novelist and playwright, A Horseman Riding By
- Ethel M. Dell (1881–1939), novelist
- Thomas Deloney (1553–1600), balladeer and novelist
- John Denham (1614/1615–1669), poet
- Felix Dennis (1947–2014), poet and publisher
- George Dennis (1814–1898), writer and explorer
- John Dennis (1657–1734), critic and playwright
- Nigel Dennis (1912–1989), writer, novelist and playwright
- Mary Deverell (1731–1805), religious writer, essayist and poet
- Colin Dexter (1930–2017), novelist, Inspector Morse novels
- Nirpal Singh Dhaliwal (born 1974), novelist and journalist
- William Diaper (1685–1717), poet and translator
- Charles Dibdin (c. 1745–1814), playwright, poet and songwriter
- Thomas Frognall Dibdin (1776–1847), bibliographer
- Thomas John Dibdin (1771–1841), playwright and songwriter
- Charles Dickens (1812–1870), novelist, David Copperfield
- Monica Dickens (1915–1992), novelist and children's writer
- Anne Hepple Dickinson (wrote as Anne Hepple, 1877–1959), novelist
- Goldsworthy Lowes Dickinson (1862–1932), historian and political activist
- John Dickinson (born 1962), YA novelist
- Patric Dickinson (1914–1994), poet, translator and playwright
- Peter Dickinson (1927–2015), novelist, children's writer and poet
- Alice Diehl (1844–1912), novelist and musician
- Kenelm Digby (1603–1665), philosopher
- Leonard Digges (1588–1635), poet and translator
- Francis Dillingham (died 1625), scholar, AV translator and cleric
- Wentworth Dillon (1630–1685), poet, critic and translator
- John Disney (1677–1729/1730), writer on moral reform and cleric
- John Disney (1746–1816), writer, biographer and Unitarian minister
- Jenny Diski (1947–2016), novelist and essayist
- Isaac D'Israeli (1766–1848), essayist
- Benjamin Disraeli (1804–1881), novelist and statesman
- Ella Hepworth Dixon (1857–1932), novelist, essayist and editor
- Henry Hall Dixon (1822–1870), writer
- Richard Watson Dixon (1833–1900), poet and church historian
- Sarah Dixon (1671–1765), poet
- William Hepworth Dixon (1821–1879), historian, biographer and travel writer
- Sydney Thompson Dobell (1824–1874), poet and critic
- Henry Austin Dobson (1840–1921), poet and essayist
- Susannah Dobson (died 1795), translator
- Catherine Isabella Dodd (1860–1932), educational writer and novelist
- William Dodd (1729–1777), writer, cleric and forger
- John Doddridge (1555–1628), writer, antiquary and judge
- Philip Doddridge (1702–1751), religious writer and hymnist
- George Bubb Dodington (1691–1792), politician, poet and diarist
- Robert Dodsley (1704–1764), poet, writer and bookseller
- Christina Dodwell (born 1951), travel writer
- Ann Doherty (c. 1786 – c. 1831–32), romantic novelist
- Berlie Doherty (born 1943), children's writer, poet and dramatist
- Paul C. Doherty (several pen names, b. 1946), novelist
- Digby Mackworth Dolben (1848–1867), poet
- Dorcas Dole (fl. later 17th century), Quaker pamphleteer
- Alfred Domett (1811–1887), poet and statesman
- Angus Donald (born 1965), novelist
- Julia Donaldson (born 1948), children's writer and playwright
- John Donne (1572–1631), poet and cleric
- Desmond Donnelly (1920–1974), writer, journalist and politician
- Eleanor Doorly (1880–1950), children's writer
- Thomas Doubleday (1790–1870), writer, playwright and songwriter
- Sarah Doudney (1841–1926), novelist, children's writer and hymnist
- Charles Montagu Doughty (1843–1926), poet, writer and traveller
- Louise Doughty (born 1963), novelist and playwright
- Keith Douglas (1920–1944), poet
- Lord Alfred Douglas (1870–1945), poet
- Norman Douglas (1868–1952), novelist
- Siobhan Dowd (1960–2007), novelist, anthologist and children's writer, Bog Child
- Mary Frances Dowdall (1876–1939), novelist and non-fiction writer
- Andrew Downes (c. 1549–1628), scholar, AV translator and cleric
- Jenny Downham (born 1964), novelist
- Freda Downie (1929-1993), poet
- Ernest Dowson (1867–1900), poet and story writer
- Arthur Conan Doyle (1859–1930), novelist and story writer, Sherlock Holmes
- Richard Doyle (1948–2017), novelist
- Francis Hastings Doyle (1810–1888), poet
- Margaret Drabble (born 1939), novelist and critic
- Phil Drabble (1914–2007), writer and broadcaster
- Judith Drake (fl. 1696–1707), essayist
- Nathan Drake (1766–1836), essayist
- Nick Drake (born 1961), poet and novelist
- Augusta Theodosia Drane (1823–1894), religious writer and biographer
- Michael Drayton (1563–1631), poet
- John Drinkwater (1882–1937), poet and playwright
- Henry Drummond (1786–1860), religious writer, politician and banker
- Anna Harriett Drury (also Harriet, 1824–1912), novelist, poet and children's writer
- John Dryden, (1631–1700) poet and playwright, Absalom and Achitophel
- Daphne du Maurier (1907–1989), novelist, Rebecca
- George du Maurier (1834–1896), novelist and illustrator, Trilby
- Edward Dubois (1774–1850), wit and man of letters
- Stephen Duck (c. 1705–1756), poet and cleric
- Agnes Mary Frances Duclaux (1857–1944), poet and author
- Ernest Dudley (real name Vivian Ernest Coltman-Allen, 1908–2006), novelist, screenwriter and actor
- Lord Dufferin (1826–1902), writer and explorer
- Charles Duff (1894–1966), writer, translator and satirist
- Lucie, Lady Duff-Gordon (1821–1869), correspondent and translator
- Maureen Duffy (1933–2026), poet, screenwriter and novelist
- Stella Duffy (born 1963), novelist and playwright
- William Dugdale (1605–1686), antiquary
- Alfred Duggan (1903–1964), historian and novelist
- Ian Duhig (born 1954), poet
- Richard Duke (1658–1711), poet and cleric
- Ashley Dukes (1885–1959), playwright and critic
- Cuthbert Dukes (1890–1977), medical writer and pathologist
- Michael Dummett (1925–2011), philosopher
- Sarah Dunant (born 1950), writer and novelist
- John Duncombe (1729–1786), poet and cleric
- William Duncombe (1690–1769), translator and playwright
- Roderic Dunkerley (1884–1966), religious writer
- Helen Dunmore (1952–2017), poet, novelist and children's writer,
- Antony Dunn (born 1973), poet and playwright
- Nell Dunn (born 1936), novelist and playwright
- James Duport (1606–1679), scholar and cleric
- John Duport (died 1617), scholar, AV translator and cleric
- Mortimer Durand (1850–1924), novelist, travel writer and diplomat
- C. V. Durell (1882–1968), mathematics writer
- Thomas D'Urfey (1653–1723), playwright and poet
- Raymond Durgnat (1932–2002), film critic
- Edith Durham (1863–1944), travel writer
- Gerald Durrell (1925–1995), naturalist and author, My Family and Other Animals
- Lawrence Durrell (1921–1990), novelist and poet, The Alexandria Quartet
- John Dunton (1659–1733), writer, bookseller and pamphleteer
- Edward Dyer (1543–1607), poet and courtier
- Geoff Dyer (born 1958), writer
- George Dyer (1755–1841), scholar and poet
- Clifford Dyment (1914–1971), poet and critic

== E ==
- Rae Earl (born 1971), writer and broadcaster
- John Earle (1601–1665), writer and bishop
- Anthony Earnshaw (1924–2001), writer and illustrator
- Joan Adeney Easdale (1913–1998), poet
- Edward Backhouse Eastwick (1814–1883), scholar
- Mary Emma Ebsworth (1794–1881), playwright and translator
- Laurence Echard (1670–1730), historian and translator
- Arthur Stanley Eddington (1882–1944), science writer
- E. R. Eddison (1882–1945), novelist, poet and translator
- Emily Eden (1797–1869), novelist
- Frederick Morton Eden (1766–1809), social researcher
- Richard Edes (1555–1604), writer, AV translator and cleric
- David Edgar (born 1948), playwright
- John George Edgar (1834–1864), miscellaneous writer for boys
- Maria Edgeworth (1767–1849), novelist, Castle Rackrent
- Richard Lovell Edgeworth (1744–1817), writer and politician
- James Edmeston (1791–1867), hymnist and architect
- Helen Edmundson (born 1964), playwright and screenwriter
- Robert Edric (real name Gary Edric Armitage, b. 1956), novelist
- J. T. Edson (1928–2014), novelist
- Richard Edwardes (c. 1523–1566), poet and playwright
- Amelia Edwards (1831–1892), novelist and travel writer
- David Edwards (1929–2018), writer and cleric
- Monica Edwards (1912–1998), children's writer
- Thomas Edwards (died 1599), poet
- Richard Eedes (died 1686), religious writer
- Pierce Egan (1772–1849), sports writer
- Pierce Egan the Younger (1814–1880), novelist
- Elizabeth Egerton (born Cavendish, 1626–1663), poet and dramatist
- George Egerton (real name Mary Chavelita Bright, 1859–1945), writer, translator and feminist
- Rowland Egerton-Warburton (1804–1891), poet
- Sarah Fyge Egerton (1670–1723), poet
- Thomas Egerton (Lord Ellesmere, Lord Brackley, 1540–1617), statesman and patron
- Stephen Elboz (born 1956), children's writer
- Josephine Elder (real name Olive Gwendoline Potter, 1895–1988), children's writer
- Peter Berresford Ellis (writes as Peter Tremayne and Peter MacAlan, born 1943), novelist
- Charles Eliot (1862–1931), travel writer and diplomat
- George Eliot (real name Mary Ann Evans, 1819–1880), novelist, Middlemarch
- T. S. Eliot (1888–1965), poet, playwright and Nobel Prize winner, The Waste Land
- Anne Elliot, novelist
- Frances Minto Elliot (1820–1898), historian and novelist
- Ebenezer Elliott (1781–1849), poet
- Janice Elliott (1931–1995), novelist and children's writer
- Julia Anne Elliott (1809-1841), poet and hymnwriter
- Edith Ellis (1861–1916), writer and anthologist
- Alice Thomas Ellis (Anna Haycraft, 1932–2005), fiction and non-fiction writer
- Edwin John Ellis (1848–1916), poet, editor and illustrator
- H. F. Ellis (1907–2000), humorous writer and novelist
- Havelock Ellis (1859–1939), sexologist, reformer and editor
- Royston Ellis (1941–2023), novelist and poet
- Sarah Stickney Ellis (1799–1872), Quaker writer on women's education
- Warren Ellis (born 1968), graphic novelist and comic book writer
- Thomas Ellwood (1639–1713), poet and religious writer
- Ernest Elmore (also as John Bude, 1901–1957), crime and fantasy writer
- Elizabeth Clarke Wolstenholme-Elmy (1833–1918), essayist and poet
- Elizabeth Elstob (1683–1756), scholar and translator
- Ben Elton (born 1959), novelist, playwright and comedian
- Oliver Elton (1861–1945), scholar and translator,
- Alfred Elwes (1819–1888), children's writer and translator
- Thomas Elyot (c. 1490–1536), scholar and diplomat
- Sally Emerson (born 1954), novelist and anthologist
- William Empson (1906–1984), critic and poet, Seven Types of Ambiguity
- William Enfield (1741–1797), elocutionist and Unitarian minister
- Barry England (1932–2009), novelist
- Isobel English (real name June Guesdon Braybrooke, 1920–1994), novelist
- D. J. Enright (1920–2002), poet and critic
- Sam Enthoven (born 1975), children's writer
- Ephelia (fl. 1679, real name probably Mary Stewart, Duchess of Richmond), poet
- Anthony Errington (died 1719), divine
- Barbara Erskine (born 1944), novelist
- Thomas Erskine (1750–1823), lawyer and political writer
- Susan Ertz (1894–1985), novelist
- Edith Escombe (1866–1950), fiction writer and essayist
- George Etherege (c. 1635 – c. 1692), playwright, The Man of Mode
- Abel Evans (1679–1737), poet and cleric
- Anne Evans (1820–1870), poet and composer
- Arthur Evans (1851–1941), archaeologist
- Arthur Benoni Evans (1781–1854), poet, scholar and cleric
- John Evans (1823–1908), archaeologist
- Katherine Evans and Sarah Cheevers (1618–1692 and 1608–1664), Quaker evangelists
- Margiad Evans (real name Peggy Eileen Williams, 1909–1958), novelist, poet and illustrator
- Nicholas Evans (1950–2022), novelist
- Paul Evans (1945–1991), poet
- Sebastian Evans (1830–1909), poet, journalist and artist
- John Evelyn (1620–1706), writer and diarist, Sylva, A Discourse of Forest Trees
- H. D. Everett (1851–1923), novelist
- Peter Everett (1931–1999), novelist
- Evelyn Everett-Green (1856–1932), novelist and children's writer
- George Every (1909–2003), theologian and poet
- Gavin Ewart (1916–1995), poet and anthologist
- Barbara Ewing (born 1944), novelist and playwright
- Juliana Horatia Ewing (1841–1885), children's writer
- Catherine Exley (1779-1857), English diarist
- Leonora Eyles (1889–1960), feminist writer and novelist
- Vincent Eyre (1811–1881), military writer and general

== F ==
- Frederick William Faber (1814–1863), hymnist and theologian
- Geoffrey Faber (1889–1961), poet and publisher
- George Stanley Faber (1773–1854), theologian and cleric
- Robert Fabyan (died 1513), diarist and chronicler
- Harry Fainlight (1935–1982), poet
- Ruth Fainlight (born 1932), poet, writer and translator
- Nan Fairbrother (1913–1971), writer and architect
- Thomas Fairfax (1612–1671), poet and army officer
- Margaret Fairley (1885–1968), scholar and activist
- J. Meade Falkner (1858–1932), novelist
- Hugh Falkus (1917–1996), fishing writer
- Julian Fane (1927–2009), novelist and memoirist
- Mildmay Fane, earl of Westmorland (1602–1666), poet and playwright
- Violet Fane (real name Mary Montgomerie Lamb, 1843–1905), novelist and poet
- Ann, Lady Fanshawe (1625–1680), memoirist
- Catherine Maria Fanshawe (1765–1834), poet
- Richard Fanshawe (1608–1666), poet and translator
- U. A. Fanthorpe (1929–2009), poet
- John Fardell (born 1967), children's writer and cartoonist
- Joseph Farington (1747–1821), diarist and painter
- Helen Farish (born 1962), poet
- Benjamin Farjeon (1838–1903), novelist and playwright
- Eleanor Farjeon (1881–1965), children's writer and poet
- Herbert Farjeon (1887–1945), playwright and critic
- Joseph Jefferson Farjeon (1883–1955), novelist, playwright and screenwriter
- Paul Farley (born 1965), poet
- Nigel Farndale (born 1964), novelist and biographer
- Jeffery Farnol (1878–1952), novelist
- Florence Farr (1860–1917), religious writer and playwright
- Frederic William Farrar (Dean Farrar, 1831–1903), novelist and cleric
- Stewart Farrar (1916–2000), scriptwriter and novelist
- J. G. Farrell (1935–1979), novelist
- Kathleen Farrell (1912–1999), novelist
- Gertrude Minnie Faulding (1875–1961), novelist and children's writer
- Sebastian Faulks (born 1953), novelist
- Joseph Fawcett (1758–1804), poet and cleric
- Francis Fawkes (1721–1777), poet and translator
- Eliza Fay (1755/1756–1816), correspondent and traveller
- John Russell Fearn (1908–1960), novelist
- Jane Fearon (1654 or 1656–1737), religious writer
- Daniel Featley or Fairclough (1582–1645), polemicist, AV translator and cleric
- Vicki Feaver (born 1943), poet
- Elaine Feinstein (1930–2019), poet, novelist and dramatist
- John Fell (1625–1686), scholar and cleric
- Owen Feltham or Felltham (c. 1602–1668), aphorist and essayist
- George Manville Fenn (1831–1909), novelist and children's writer
- John Fenn (died 1615), writer and RC priest
- John Fenn (1739–1794), antiquary and editor
- Elijah Fenton (1683–1730), poet
- Geoffrey Fenton (c. 1539–1608), writer, translator and politician
- Gertrude Fenton (1841-1884), novelist and editor
- James Fenton (born 1949), poet and critic
- Roger Fenton (1565–1615), writer, AV translator and cleric
- Eliza Fenwick (1766–1840), novelist and children's writer
- Ruby Ferguson (1899–1966), novelist and children's writer
- Bernard Fergusson Lord Ballantrae, (1911–1980), historian and general
- Patrick Leigh Fermor (1915–2011), travel writer and scholar
- Elizabeth Ferrars (1907–1995), novelist
- Maria Fetherstonhaugh (1847–1918), novelist
- Jasper Fforde (born 1961), novelist
- Bradda Field (1893–1957), novelist
- Michael Field, pseudonym of Katherine Harris Bradley (1846–1914) and Edith Emma Cooper (1862–1913), poets and diarists
- Richard Field (1561–1616), theologian
- Daphne Fielding (1904–1997), writer and biographer
- Helen Fielding (born 1958), novelist and screenwriter
- Henry Fielding (1707–1754), novelist and poet, Tom Jones
- Sarah Fielding (1709–1768), novelist and children's writer
- Xan Fielding (1918–1991), writer, translator and soldier
- Celia Fiennes (1662–1741), diarist and travel writer
- William Fiennes (born 1970), writer
- Graeme Fife (living), writer, playwright and broadcaster
- Eva Figes (1932–2012), novelist and critic
- Robert Filmer (1588–1653), political writer
- Anne Finch, Countess of Winchilsea (1661–1720), poet
- Brian Finch (1936–2007), scriptwriter and playwright
- William Coles Finch (1864–1944), historian and countryside writer
- Anne Fine (born 1947), novelist and children's writer
- Cordelia Fine (living), psychologist and writer
- George Finlay (1799–1875), historian
- Ronald Firbank (1886–1926), novelist and playwright
- Charles Harding Firth (1857–1936), historian and biographer
- John Rupert Firth (1890–1960), linguistics scholar
- Tim Firth (born 1964), playwright, screenwriter and songwriter
- Margery Fish (1892–1969), garden writer
- Tibor Fischer (born 1959), novelist
- Allen Fisher (born 1944), poet and editor
- Ann Fisher (1719–1798), educational writer
- John Fisher (1469–1535), theologian, cardinal and martyr
- Roy Fisher (1930–2017), poet and jazz pianist
- Edward Fitzgerald (1809–1883), poet and translator, The Rubaiyat of Omar Khayyam
- Penelope Fitzgerald (1916–2000), novelist, poet and biographer
- Dionys Fitzherbert (c.1580–1640), spiritual life writer
- Judith Flanders (born 1959), historian
- Peter Flannery (born 1951), playwright and screenwriter
- Thomas Flatman (1638–1688), poet and miniaturist
- James Elroy Flecker (1884–1915), poet, novelist and playwright
- Richard Flecknoe (c. 1600 – c. 1678), poet, playwright and writer
- Abraham Fleming (Flemyng, c. 1552 – 1607), writer, translator and cleric
- Ian Fleming (1908–1964), novelist, James Bond
- Peter Fleming (1907–1971), travel writer
- Giles Fletcher (1586–1623), poet
- Giles Fletcher (c. 1548–1611), poet
- J. S. Fletcher (1863–1935) novelist
- John Fletcher (1579–1625), playwright
- Phineas Fletcher (1582–1650), poet
- Susan Fletcher (born 1979), novelist
- Thomas Fletcher (1666–1713), poet, translator and cleric
- Antony Flew (1923–2010), philosopher
- Robert Newton Flew (1886–1962), theologian and Methodist minister
- F. S. Flint (1885–1960), poet
- John Florio (1553–1625), lexicographer and translator
- Alice Flowerdew (1759–1830), poet and hymnist
- Robert Fludd (1574–1637), physician and occultist
- Giles Foden (born 1967), novelist
- Winifred Foley (1914–2009), memoirist and novelist
- Albany Fonblanque (1794–1872), journalist and editor
- Samuel Foote (1720–1777), playwright
- Tim Footman (born 1968), writer and editor
- Colin Forbes (real name Raymond Sawkins, 1923–2006), novelist
- Duncan Forbes (born 1947), poet
- Anne Ford (1737–1824), writer and actress
- Boris Ford (1917–1998), critic and editor
- Ford Madox Ford (originally Ford Madox Hueffer, 1873–1939), novelist and poet
- John Ford (1586–1640), playwright, 'Tis Pity She's a Whore
- Mark Ford (born 1962), poet and essayist
- Richard Ford (1796–1858), travel writer
- Thomas Ford or Forde (1580–1648), poet and composer
- Michael Foreman (born 1938), children's writer and illustrator
- C. S. Forester, (1899–1966) novelist, Horatio Hornblower
- Simon Forman, (1552–1611) astrologer and occultist
- David Forrest (real names R. Forrest-Webb and David Eliades, living), novelists
- Alfred Henry Forrester (Alfred Crowquill, 1804–1872), writer and illustrator
- Helen Forrester (1919–2011), writer
- Tony Forrester (born 1953), bridge writer and player
- Jeff Forshaw (born 1968), professor of particle physics
- E. M. Forster (1879–1970), novelist and essayist, A Passage to India
- John Forster (1812–1876), biographer and critic
- Margaret Forster (1938–2016), novelist and biographer
- Mary Forster (c. 1620–1687), Quaker polemicist
- Frederick Forsyth (1938–2025), novelist, The Day of the Jackal
- Richard Fortey (1946–2025), science writer
- E. M. Foster, Mrs. (fl. late 18th and early 19th cc.), novelist
- John Foster (1770–1843), essayist
- John Knight Fotheringham (1874–1936), historian and astronomer
- Adam Foulds (born 1974), novelist and poet
- Tim Fountain (born 1967), playwright
- Margaret Fountaine (1862–1940), lepidopterist
- Ellen Thorneycroft Fowler (also Edith Henrietta Fowler, 1860–1929), novelist
- Henry Watson Fowler (1858–1933) and Francis George Fowler (1871–1918), grammarians, Fowler's Modern English Usage
- John Fowles (1926–2005), novelist and essayist
- Caroline Fox (1819–1871), diarist
- Francis Fox (1675–1738), writer and cleric
- George Fox (1624–1691), diarist and Quaker
- Robin Lane Fox (born 1946), garden writer
- Edgar Foxall (1906–1990), poet
- John Foxe (1517–1587), writer, Foxe's Book of Martyrs
- Samuel Foxe (1560–1630), diarist
- Dick Francis (1920–2010), racing novelist
- Matthew Francis (born 1956), poet
- Philip Francis (1740–1818), pamphleteer and translator
- Suzanne Francis (born 1959), novelist
- Gilbert Frankau (1884–1952), novelist and poet
- Julia Frankau (wrote as Frank Danby, 1863–1916), novelist
- John Franklin (1786–1847), explorer and novelist
- Antonia Fraser (1932), biographer and novelist
- Caro Fraser (1953–2020), novelist
- George MacDonald Fraser (1925–2008), novelist and screenwriter, The Flashman Papers
- Michael Frayn (born 1933), playwright and novelist
- Margaret Frazer (pseudonym, living), novelist
- Jonathan Freedland (born 1967), writer
- Edward Augustus Freeman (1823–1892), historian
- John Freeman (1880–1929), poet
- R. Austin Freeman (1862–1943), novelist
- Nicholas Freeston (1907–1988), poet
- Elizabeth Wynne Fremantle (1779–1857), diarist
- Celia Fremlin (1914–2009), novelist
- Patrick French (born 1966), biographer and author
- John Hookham Frere (1769–1846), poet and translator
- William Powell Frith (1819–1909), memoirist and painter
- James Anthony Froude (1818–1894), historian
- Richard Hurrell Froude (1803–1836), poet, writer and cleric
- C. B. Fry, (1872–1956) cricket writer
- Caroline Fry (1787–1846), religious writer and poet
- Christopher Fry (1907–2005), dramatist
- Plantagenet Somerset Fry (real name Peter George Robin Fry, 1931–1996), historian
- Stephen Fry (born 1957), novelist and comedian
- Alexandra Fuller (born 1969), writer
- Andrew Fuller (1754–1815), theologian and Baptist minister
- Claire Fuller (living), novelist
- John Fuller (born 1937), poet and novelist
- Peter Fuller (1947–1990), writer and art critic
- Roy Fuller (1912–1991), poet and novelist
- Thomas Fuller (1608–1661), writer, historian and cleric
- Lady Georgiana Fullerton (originally Leverson-Gower, 1812–1885), novelist and religious writer
- Ulpian Fulwell (1545/1546 – c. 1585), playwright, satirist and cleric
- Monica Furlong (1930–2003), religious writer and biographer
- Frederick James Furnivall (1825–1910), philologist

== G ==
- Thomas Gage (c. 1597–1656), travel writer and cleric
- Neil Gaiman (born 1960), novelist and screenwriter
- Norman Gale (1862–1942), poet
- Winifred Gales (1761–1839), novelist and memoirist
- John Galsworthy (also as John Sinjohn, 1867–1933), novelist and dramatist, The Forsyte Saga
- Francis Galton (1822–1911), polymath
- Jane Gardam (1928–2025), novelist and children's writer
- Samuel Rawson Gardiner (1829–1902), historian
- Stephen Gardiner (1924–2007), writer and architect
- Gerald Gardner (1884–1964), writer on witchcraft
- Helen Gardner (1908–1986), critic and scholar
- John Gardner (1926–2007), novelist, The Liquidator
- Leon Garfield (1921–1996), novelist and children's writer
- Simon Garfield (born 1960), writer
- Alex Garland (born 1970), novelist and screenwriter
- Madge Garland (1898–1990), fashion journalist
- Alan Garner (born 1934), children's writer
- William Garner (1920–2005), novelist
- Constance Garnett (1861–1946), translator
- David Garnett (1892–1981), novelist and playwright
- Edward Garnett (1868–1937), author and critic
- Eve Garnett (1900–1991), children's writer and illustrator
- Richard Garnett (1835–1906), scholar and poet
- David Garrick (1717–1779), actor, playwright and poet
- Samuel Garth (1661–1719), poet and physician
- Charles Garvice (also as Caroline Hart, 1850–1920), novelist
- George Gascoigne (1535–1577), poet and translator
- David Gascoyne (1916–2001), poet
- Norman Gash (1912–2009), historian
- Elizabeth Gaskell (Mrs. Gaskell, 1810–1865), novelist, Cranford
- Jane Gaskell (born 1941), fantasy novelist
- Thomas Gaspey (1788–1871), novelist and journalist
- Francis Aidan Gasquet (1846–1929), historian and cardinal
- Jonathan Gathorne-Hardy (1933–2019), biographer and historian
- Robert Gathorne-Hardy (1902–1973), garden writer
- Alfred Gatty, (1813–1903) writer and cleric
- Margaret Gatty (wrote as Mrs. Alfred Gatty, 1809–1873), children's writer
- John Gauden (1605–1662), writer and bishop
- William Gaunt (1900–1980), art historian
- Jamila Gavin (born 1941), novelist and children's writer
- John Gawsworth (1912–1970), poet and anthologist
- John Gay (1685–1732), poet and playwright, The Beggar's Opera
- John Gay (1699–1745), moral philosopher and cleric
- Maggie Gee (born 1948), novelist
- Pam Gems (1925–2011), playwright
- Dorothea Gerard (1855–1915), novelist
- Emily Gerard (1849–1905), novelist
- John Gerard (1545–1611/1612), botanical writer and herbalist
- William Gerhardie (originally Gerhardi, 1895–1977), novelist
- Karen Gershon (1923–1993), poet, writer and novelist
- Edward Gibbon (1737–1794), historian, The History of the Decline and Fall of the Roman Empire
- Stella Gibbons (1902–1989), novelist and poet, Cold Comfort Farm
- Philip Gibbs (1877–1962), writer and journalist
- Edmund Gibson (1669–1748), antiquary, translator and bishop
- Miles Gibson (born 1947), novelist and poet
- Wilfrid Wilson Gibson (1878–1962), poet
- John Gifford (1758–1818), historical and political writer
- William Gifford (1756–1826), poet and satirist
- Harriett Gilbert (born 1948), novelist, critic and broadcaster
- Joseph Gilbert (1779–1852), writer and Congregational minister
- Michael Gilbert (1912–2006), novelist
- W. S. Gilbert (1836–1911), playwright and poet, The Mikado
- William Gilbert or Gilberd (1544–1603), scientist
- William Gilbert (1804–1890), novelist and naval surgeon
- Alexander Gilchrist (1828–1861), biographer and critic
- Anne Gilchrist (born Burrows, 1828–1885), writer
- Robert Murray Gilchrist (1867–1917), novelist and topographical writer
- Penelope Gilliatt (1932–1993), novelist, screenwriter and film critic
- William Gilpin (1724–1804), writer, artist and cleric
- Morris Ginsberg (1879–1970), sociologist
- Alfred Gissing (1896–1975), biographer and editor
- Algernon Gissing (1860–1937), novelist and travel writer
- George Gissing (1857–1903), novelist, New Grub Street
- Mary Gladstone (1847–1927), diarist
- William Gladstone (1809–1898), writer and statesman
- Lesley Glaister (born 1956), novelist and playwright
- Joseph Glanvill (1636–1680), writer, philosopher and cleric
- Brian Glanville (1931–2025), football writer and novelist
- William Nugent Glascock (c. 1787–1847), novelist and naval officer
- Katharine Glasier (also as Katharine Conway, 1867–1950), writer and socialist
- Rodge Glass (born 1978), novelist and biographer
- Hannah Glasse (1708–1770), writer on cookery and housekeeping
- Victoria Glendinning (born 1937), biographer and novelist
- Richard Glover (1712–1785), poet and playwright
- Elinor Glyn (1864–1943), novelist
- John Godber (born 1956), playwright
- Robert Goddard (born 1954), novelist
- Rumer Godden (1907–1998), novelist, children's writer and biographer
- A. D. Godley (1856–1925), comic poet
- Sidney Godolphin (1610–1643), poet
- William Godwin (1756–1836), novelist and philosopher
- Louis Golding (1895–1958), novelist and poet
- William Golding (1911–1993), Nobel Prize–winning novelist and poet, Lord of the Flies
- Douglas Goldring (1887–1960), poet, travel writer and novelist
- Israel Gollancz (1863–1930), scholar and editor
- Laurence Gomme (1853–1916), folklore writer and public servant
- Christopher Goodman (1520–1603), pamphleteer and Bible translator
- Jason Goodwin (born 1964), novelist and travel writer
- Barnabe Googe or Gooche (1540–1594), poet and translator
- Catherine Gore (1799–1861), novelist and playwright
- Charles Gore (1853–1932), theologian and bishop
- Geoffrey Gorer (1905–1985), writer and anthropologist
- Arthur Gorges (c. 1569–1625), poet and sea captain
- Ray Gosling (1939–2013), writer and journalist
- Edmund Gosse (1849–1928), novelist, poet and critic
- Philip Henry Gosse (1810–1888), natural historian
- Stephen Gosson (1554–1624), satirist and playwright
- Elizabeth Goudge (1900–1984), novelist and children's writer
- William Gouge (1575–1653), writer and cleric
- Thomas Gouge (1609–1681), writer and Presbyterian minister
- Harold Eric Gough (1921–2008), writer, historian, museum curator, lecturer and librarian
- Gerald Gould (1885–1936), poet and journalist
- Nathaniel Gould (1857–1919), novelist
- John Gower (c. 1330–1408), poet
- Posie Graeme-Evans (living), novelist and TV director
- Eleanor Graham (1896–1984), children's writer, editor and anthologist
- Harry Graham (1874–1936), humorist and poet
- Laurie Graham (born 1947), novelist and journalist
- Stephen Graham (1884–1975), travel writer and novelist
- Virginia Graham (1910–1993), humorist, translator and poet
- Kenneth Grahame (1859–1931), writer, The Wind in the Willows
- Sarah Grand (real name Mrs. David C. M'Fall, originally Frances Elizabeth Clarke, 1854–1943), novelist and suffragist
- Clive Granger (1934–2009), Nobel Prize–winning economist
- Andrew Grant (born 1968), novelist
- John Grant (also as Jonathan Gash, Graham Gaunt, b. 1933), novelist and physician
- Linda Grant (born 1951), novelist and writer
- Michael Grant (1914–2004), historian
- George Granville, 1st Baron Lansdowne (1666–1735), playwright and poet
- Harley Granville-Barker (1877–1946), playwright and actor
- Richard Graves (1715–1804), novelist, poet and cleric
- Robert Graves (1895–1985), poet and novelist, I, Claudius
- John Gray (1866–1934), poet and translator
- John N. Gray (born 1948), philosopher
- Maxwell Gray (Mary Gleed Tuttiett, 1846–1926), novelist and poet
- Patience Gray (1917–2005), cookery writer
- Simon Gray (1936–2008) playwright, novelist and memoirist.
- Thomas Gray (1716–1771), poet
- Eliza S. Craven Green (1803–1866), poet
- Candida Lycett Green (1942–2014), writer and journalist
- Henry Green (real name Henry Vincent Yorke), (1905–1973), novelist
- John Richard Green (1837–1883), historian
- Mary Anne Everett Green (1818–1895), historian
- Matthew Green (1696–1737), poet
- Roger Lancelyn Green (1918–1987), biographer and children's writer
- Sarah Green (fl. 1790–1825), novelist
- Thomas Hill Green (1836–1882), philosopher and radical
- Vivian H. H. Green (1915–2005), historian and cleric
- Kate Greenaway (1846–1901), children's writer and illustrator
- Graham Greene (1904–1991), novelist and playwright, Our Man in Havana
- Robert Greene (1558–1592), playwright and pamphleteer
- Chris Greenhalgh (born 1963), novelist, screenwriter and poet
- Lavinia Greenlaw (born 1962), poet and novelist
- Frederick Greenwood (1830–1909), man of letters
- James Greenwood (c. 1830/1835–1929), children's writer and journalist
- Walter Greenwood (1903–1974), novelist, Love on the Dole
- Walter Wilson Greg (1875–1959), bibliographer
- Richard Gregory (1864–1952), science writer and astronomer
- Joyce Grenfell (1910–1979), writer and comedian
- Julian Grenfell (1888–1915), poet
- Charles Greville (1794–1865), diarist and cricketer
- Frances Greville (c. 1724–1789), poet
- Fulke Greville, Lord Brooke (1554–1628), poet and playwright
- Henry M. Grey (1867-1937), travel writer
- Paul Grice (also as H. P. Grice, 1913–1988), philosopher of language
- Arthur Griffiths (1838–1908), crime novelist and military historian
- Bill Griffiths (1948–2007), poet, scholar and translator
- Jane Griffiths (born 1970), poet and lecturer
- Paul Griffiths (born 1947), novelist, librettist and music critic
- John Grigg (1924–2001), biographer and journalist
- Geoffrey Grigson (1905–1985), poet and editor
- Arthur Grimble (1888–1956), writer and anthropologist
- Elizabeth Grimston (c. 1563 – c. 1603), poet
- Leopold Hartley Grindon (1818–1904), educator and botanist
- Francis Grose (1731–1791), antiquary and lexicographer
- John Gross (1935–2011), critic, writer and anthologist
- Philip Gross (born 1952), poet, novelist and playwright
- George Grossmith (1847–1912), writer and entertainer, and Weedon Grossmith (1854–1919), writer, artist and actor, Diary of a Nobody
- George Grote (1794–1871), classicist and reformer
- Charlotte Grove (1773–1860), diarist
- George Grove (1820–1900), editor and writer on music, Grove's Dictionary of Music and Musicians
- Paul Groves (born 1947), poet
- Edward Grubb (1854–1939), Quaker writer
- Bertha Jane Grundy (1837–1912), novelist
- Sydney Grundy (1848–1914), playwright and librettist
- Philip Guedalla (1889–1944), historian and travel writer
- Harry Guest (1932–2021), poet
- Arthur Guirdham (1905–1992), non-fiction writer, novelist and physician
- Thom Gunn (1929–2004), poet
- Elizabeth Gunning (1769–1823), novelist and translator
- Peter Gunning (1614–1684), writer and bishop
- Edmund Gurney (1847–1888), writer and psychologist
- Ivor Gurney (1890–1937), poet and composer
- Thomas Anstey Guthrie (wrote as F. Anstey, 1856–1934), novelist and journalist, Vice Versa
- Bernard Gutteridge (1916–1985), poet
- Emma Jane Guyton or Worboise (1825–1887), novelist
- Brion Gysin (1916–1986), poet, novelist and painter

== H ==
- William Habington (1605–1654), poet
- Alan Hackney (1924–2009), novelist and screenwriter
- Jen Hadfield (born 1978), poet
- Mark Haddon (born 1962), novelist, children's writer and poet
- Henry Rider Haggard (1856–1925), novelist and story writer, King Solomon's Mines
- Matt Haig (born 1975), novelist and journalist
- Richard Hakluyt (c. 1552/1553–1616), travel writer, translator and cleric
- J. B. S. Haldane (1892–1964), scientist, philosopher and children's writer
- Kathleen Hale (1898–2000), children's writer and illustrator, Orlando the Marmalade Cat
- Anne Halkett (1623–1699), memoirist and religious writer
- Edward Hall or Halle (c. 1498–1547), chronicler
- Evelyn Beatrice Hall (wrote as S. G. Tallentyre, 1868–1956), biographer and translator
- Henry Hall (c. 1656–1707), poet and composer
- Joseph Hall (1574–1656), satirist, moralist and bishop
- Radclyffe Hall (1880–1943), novelist and poet
- Sarah Hall (born 1974), novelist and poet
- Simon Hall (born 1969), novelist and broadcaster
- Steven Hall (born 1975), novelist and playwright
- Tarquin Hall (born 1969), writer and journalist
- Thomas Hall (1610–1665), writer and cleric
- Arthur Hallam (1811–1833), poet
- Henry Hallam (1777–1859), historian
- Edward Halliwell (16th c.), playwright and author, Fellow of Cambridge's King's College
- Leslie Halliwell (1929–1989), film critic and encyclopedist
- James Halliwell-Phillipps (1820–1889), Shakespearean and biographer
- Bruce Barrymore Halpenny (born early 20th c.), writer and military historian
- Alan Halsey (1949–2022), poet
- Michael Hamburger (1924–2007), writer, poet and translator
- Philip Gilbert Hamerton (wrote as Adolphus Segrave, 1834–1894), writer and artist
- Mohsin Hamid (born 1971), novelist and brand consultant
- Andy Hamilton (author) (born 1974), non-fiction writer and journalist
- Ann Mary Hamilton (fl. 1806–13), novelist
- Charles Hamilton (also as Frank Richards, etc., 1876–1961), children's writer, Billy Bunter
- Cicely Mary Hamilton (1872–1952), writer, playwright and feminist
- Cosmo Hamilton (1870–1942), playwright and novelist
- Edward Walter Hamilton (1847–1908), political diarist and civil servant
- Ian Hamilton (1938–2001), critic, biographer and poet
- Patrick Hamilton (1904–1962), playwright and novelist
- Peter F. Hamilton (born 1960), SF novelist
- James Hamilton-Paterson (born 1941), novelist, poet and writer
- Edward Bruce Hamley (1824–1893), military theorist and novelist
- Edward Hamley (1764–1834), poet and cleric
- James Hammond (1710–1742), poet and politician
- Stuart Hampshire (1914–2004), philosopher and literary critic
- John Hampson (1901–1955), novelist
- Robert Gavin Hampson (born 1948), poet
- Christopher Hampton (born 1946), playwright, screenwriter and translator
- William Hampton (born 1959), poet
- Marika Hanbury-Tenison (1938–1982), cookery and travel writer
- Irene Handl (1901–1987), novelist and actress
- St. John Hankin (1869–1909), playwright
- James Hanley (1897–1985), novelist and screenwriter
- Sophie Hannah (born 1971), poet and novelist
- Derek Hansen (born 1944), novelist
- Jonas Hanway (1712–1786), travel writer and pamphleteer
- Caroline Hardaker (born 1986), poet and novelist
- Michael Hardcastle (1933–2019), children's writer
- John Harding (died 1610), scholar, AV translator and cleric
- Frances Hardinge (born 1973), children's writer
- Mollie Hardwick (1916–2003), novelist and writer
- Ronald Hardy (1919–1991), novelist
- Thomas Hardy (1840–1928), novelist and poet, The Mayor of Casterbridge
- Augustus Hare (1834–1903), travel writer and raconteur
- Augustus William Hare (1792–1834), essayist and cleric
- Cyril Hare (real name A. A. G. Clark, 1900–1958), novelist
- David Hare (born 1947), playwright
- Julius Charles Hare (1795–1855), religious writer
- R. M. Hare (1919–2002), philosopher
- Roger Hargreaves (1935–1988), children's writer and illustrator, Mr. Men
- James Harington (1611–1677), political writer
- John Harington (1561–1612), poet and translator
- John Harmar (c. 1555–1613), scholar, AV translator and cleric
- Cynthia Harnett (1893–1981), children's writer
- Charles George Harper (1863–1943), travel writer and illustrator
- Beatrice Harraden (1864–1936), novelist, lexicographer and suffragist
- Thomas Harriot (1560–1621), astronomer, mathematician and translator
- Frank Harris (1856–1931), writer, editor and autobiographer
- James Harris (1709–1780), philosopher and grammarian
- Joanne Harris (born 1964), novelist
- Mary Dormer Harris (1867–1936), historian, translator and writer
- Robert Harris (born 1957), novelist, writer and screenwriter
- Rosemary Harris (born 1927), children's writer
- Austin Harrison (1873–1928), editor and writer
- Jane Ellen Harrison (1850–1928), classicist
- Sarah Harrison (born 1946), novelist and children's writer
- Thomas Harrison (1555–1631), scholar, AV translator and cleric
- Tony Harrison (1938–2025), poet and playwright
- William Harrison (1534–1593), writer and cleric
- Tom Harrisson (also as T. H. Harrisson, 1911–1976), polymath
- David Harsent (wrote as Jack Curtis, David Lawrence, b. 1942), novelist, poet and scriptwriter
- B. H. Liddell Hart (1895–1970), historian and army officer
- Christopher Hart (also as William Napier, b. 1965), novelist
- Adam Hart-Davis (born 1943), writer and broadcaster
- Duff Hart-Davis (born 1936), biographer and naturalist
- Walter Harte (1709–1774), poet and historian
- David Hartley (1705–1757), philosopher and psychologist
- John Hartley (1839–1915), dialect poet and writer
- L. P. Hartley (1895–1972), novelist, The Go-Between
- Frederick William Harvey (1888–1957), poet
- Gabriel Harvey (c. 1545–1630), poet and writer
- John Harvey (born 1938), novelist
- William Harvey (1578–1657), physician
- F. W. Harvey (1888–1957), poet
- W. F. Harvey (1885–1937), story writer
- Lee Harwood (1939–2015), poet
- Alamgir Hashmi (born 1951), poet and scholar
- Minnie Louise Haskins (1875–1957), poet and welfare worker
- Christopher Hassall (1912–1963), playwright, actor and poet
- Edward Hasted (1732–1812), historian
- Michael Hastings (1938–2011), playwright, novelist and screenwriter
- Richard Hathwaye, (fl. 1597–1603) playwright
- Ann Hatton (wrote as Ann of Swansea, 1764–1838), novelist
- Joseph Hatton (1841–1907), novelist and editor
- William Haughton (died 1605), playwright
- Frances Ridley Havergal (1836–1879), poet and hymnist
- Stephen Hawes (c. 1474–1523), poet
- Robert Stephen Hawker (1803–1875), poet and cleric
- John Hawkesworth (1715–1773), writer, editor and playwright
- John Hawkins (1719–1789), writer and biographer
- Laetitia Matilda Hawkins (1759–1835), novelist
- Spike Hawkins (1943–2017), poet and performer
- Thomas Hawkins (1575 – c. 1640), poet and translator
- Ian Hay (real name John Hay Beith, 1876–1952), novelist and playwright
- Roy Hay (1910–1989), garden writer and broadcaster
- William Hayley (1745–1820), poet, playwright and biographer
- Carole Hayman (living), novelist, screenwriter and actor
- Robert Hayman (1575–1629), poet and colonist
- Natalie Haynes (born 1974), historian and novelist
- Mary Hays (1759–1843), novelist
- Alethea Hayter (1911–2006), biographer and historian
- William Hayter (diplomat) (1906–1995), writer
- Abraham Hayward (1801–1884), essayist
- John Hayward (c. 1560–1627), historian
- Eliza Haywood (1793–1756), novelist, playwright and poet
- C. H. Hazlewood (1823–1875), playwright
- William Hazlitt (1778–1830), essayist and critic
- Mary Hearne (fl. 1718), novelist
- Thomas Hearne or Hearn (1678–1735), antiquary and scholar
- Ambrose Heath (originally Francis Geoffrey Miller, 1891–1969), cookery writer and translator
- Thomas Little Heath (1861–1940), classicist and translator
- John Heath-Stubbs (1918–2006), poet, translator and anthologist
- Reginald Heber (1783–1826), poet, hymnist and bishop
- Richard Heber (1773–1833), classicist and editor
- Annie French Hector (Mrs Alexander, 1825–1902), novelist
- Zoë Heller (born 1965), novelist and journalist
- Elizabeth Helme (c. 1753 – c. 1812), novelist and translator
- Arthur Helps (1813–1875), writer, novelist and biographer
- Racey Helps (1913–1970), children's writer
- Felicia Hemans (1793–1835), poet
- Maggie Hemingway (1946–1993), novelist
- John Henley (1692–1756), poet, writer and cleric
- Samuel Henley (1740–1815), poet and writer
- William Ernest Henley (1849–1903), poet
- Charles Frederick Henningsen (1815–1877), writer and mercenary
- Robert Henriques (1905–1967), novelist and biographer
- Alan Henry (1947–2016), Grand Prix reporter and writer.
- Matthew Henry (1662–1714), Bible commentator and cleric
- Philip Henry (1631–1696), diarist and cleric
- John Stevens Henslow (1796–1861), botanist, geologist and cleric
- Philip Henslowe, (c. 1550–1616), diarist and theatre manager
- G. A. Henty, (1832–1902), novelist
- Philip Hensher (born 1965), novelist and critic
- Rayner Heppenstall (1911–1981), novelist and poet
- John Abraham Heraud (1799–1887), poet, playwright and critic
- A. P. Herbert (1890–1971), humorist, novelist and playwright
- Edward Herbert, Lord Herbert of Cherbury (1583–1648), poet and soldier
- George Herbert (1593–1633), poet
- James Herbert (1943–2013), novelist
- Mary Herbert, countess of Pembroke (1561–1621), poet and translator
- William Herbert (1718–1795), bibliographer
- William Herbert (1771–1851), antiquary and librarian
- William Herbert (1778–1847), poet, cleric and botanist
- Edward Heron-Allen (1861–1943), novelist, historian and translator
- Robert Herrick (1591–1674), poet and cleric
- James Herriot (pen name of James Alfred Wight, 1916–1995), writer
- Elizabeth Hervey (1759–1824), novelist
- John Hervey (1696–1743), political writer and memoirist
- Thomas Kibble Hervey (1799–1859), poet and critic
- D. G. Hessayon (1928–2025), garden writer
- Maurice Hewlett (1861–1923), historical novelist and poet
- John Hey (1734–1815), theologian and poet
- Richard Hey (1745–1835), essayist and academic
- William Hey (1736–1819), surgeon
- Christopher Heydon (1561–1623), astrologist
- John Heydon (1629 – c. 1667), astrologer and Rosicrucian
- Georgette Heyer (1902–1974), novelist
- Peter Heylin or Heylyn (1600–1662), pamphleteer and cleric
- Jasper Heywood (1535–1598), poet and translator
- John Heywood (c. 1497 – c. 1580), playwright and poet
- Thomas Heywood (early 1570s – 1641), playwright, A Woman Killed with Kindness
- Eleanor Hibbert (originally Eleanor Alice Burford, wrote as Jean Plaidy, etc., 1906–1993), novelist
- Robert Smythe Hichens (1864–1950), novelist and playwright
- William Hickey (1749–1830), memoirist
- Jack Higgins (wrote as Harry Patterson, 1929–2022), novelist
- Philip E. High (1914–2006), science fiction novelist
- Susanna Highmore (1690–1750), poet
- Aaron Hill (1685–1750), playwright and writer
- Christopher Hill (1912–2003), historian
- Eric Hill (1927–2014), children's writer and illustrator
- Geoffrey Hill (1932–2016), poet and academic
- John Hill (c. 1716–1775), novelist, journalist and botanist
- Justin Hill (born 1971), novelist, biographer and translator
- Lorna Hill (1902–1991), children's writer and novelist
- Octavia Hill (1838–1912), social reformer
- Reginald Hill (1936–2012), novelist
- Rosemary Hill (living), cultural historian and biographer
- Selima Hill (born 1945), poet
- Susan Hill (born 1942), novelist and writer
- Tobias Hill (born 1970), novelist and poet
- Mischa Hiller (born 1962), novelist
- Lawrence D. Hills (1911–1991), garden writer
- Jeff Hilson (born 1966), poet
- James Hilton (1900–1954), novelist
- Lisa Hilton (living), novelist and biographer
- Walter Hilton (1340–1396), mystic
- Barry Hines (1939–2016), novelist
- Nigel Hinton (born 1941), novelist and children's writer
- Shakespeare Hirst (1841–1907), actor, author and Shakespearean
- William Henry Hitchener (fl. 1813), travel writer
- Henry Hitchings (born 1974), writer and scholar
- Alfred Hitchcock (1899–1980), screenwriter and director
- Christopher Eric Hitchens (1949–2011), writer and journalist
- Benjamin Hoadly (1676–1761), polemicist and bishop
- Louisa Gurney Hoare (1784–1836), diarist and educator
- Richard Colt Hoare (1758–1838), diarist, travel writer and antiquary
- Thomas Hobbes, (1588–1679) political philosopher, Leviathan
- Peter Hobbs (born 1973), novelist
- John Hobhouse, 1st Baron Broughton (1786–1869), political writer and diarist
- Eric Hobsbawm (1917–2012), historian
- Margaret Hoby (1571–1633), diarist
- Joseph Hocking (1860–1937), novelist and cleric
- Silas Hocking (1850–1935), novelist and cleric
- Jane Aiken Hodge (1917–2009), novelist
- C. Walter Hodges (1909–2004), children's writer and illustrator
- Ralph Hodgson (1871–1962), poet and translator
- Shadworth Hodgson (1832–1912), philosopher
- W. N. Hodgson (wrote as Edward Melbourne, 1893–1916), poet
- Barbara Hofland (1770–1844), children's writer
- Thomas Jefferson Hogg (1792–1862), biographer
- Simon Hoggart (1946–2014), writer and broadcaster
- Pete Hoida (born 1944), poet and painter
- Fanny Holcroft (1780–1844), novelist and poet
- Thomas Holcroft (1745–1809), playwright and miscellanist
- Molly Holden (1927–1981), poet
- William Holder (1616–1698), music scholar and cleric
- Robert Holdstock (1948–2009), novelist
- Margaret Holford (1757–1834), novelist, playwright and poet
- Margaret Holford (1778–1852), poet and translator
- Raphael Holinshed (1529–1580), chronicler, translator and cleric
- Abraham Holland (died 1626), poet
- Jane Holland (born 1966), poet and novelist
- John Holland (1794–1872), poet and journalist
- Philemon Holland (1552–1637), translator
- Sarah Holland (born 1961), writer and actress
- Thomas Holland (1539–1612), scholar, AV translator and cleric
- William Holland (1746–1819), diarist and cleric
- Helen Hollick (born 1953), novelist
- Alan Hollinghurst (born 1954), novelist and translator
- John Holloway (1920–1999), poet and scholar
- Constance Holme (1880–1955), novelist and playwright
- John Holmes (1703–1760), educator
- Richard Holmes (born 1945), biographer
- Robert Holmes (1926–1986), scriptwriter
- Emily Sarah Holt (1836–1893), novelist and children's writer
- Hazel Holt (1928–2015), novelist
- Winifred Holtby (1898–1935), novelist
- Stewart Home (born 1962), novelist, writer and artist
- Joseph Hone (1937–2016), novelist
- William Hone (1780–1842), satirist and bookseller
- Thomas Hood (1799–1845), poet and humorist
- Tom Hood (1835–1874), humorist, playwright and poet
- Theodore Hook (1788–1841), writer and prankster
- Jeremy Hooker (born 1941), poet, critic and broadcaster
- Joseph Dalton Hooker (1817–1911), botanist and explorer
- Richard Hooker (1554–1600), theologian
- William Jackson Hooker (1785–1865), botanist
- John Hoole (1727–1803), translator and poet
- Alexander Beresford Hope (1820–1887), writer
- Anthony Hope, (real name Anthony Hope Hawkins, 1863–1933) novelist, The Prisoner of Zenda
- Thomas Hope (1769–1831), writer and novelist
- Bill Hopkins (1928–2011), novelist
- Cathy Hopkins (born 1953), children's novelist
- Gerard Manley Hopkins (1844–1889), poet, "The Wreck of the Deutschland"
- Simon Hopkinson (born 1954), food writer and chef
- Sydney Horler (1888–1954), novelist
- Alfred Aloysius Horn (1861–1931), travel writer
- Nick Hornby (born 1957), novelist
- Alistair Horne (1925–2017), historian and biographer
- Kenneth Horne (1900–1975), playwright
- Richard Henry Horne (1802–1884), poet and critic
- Roy Horniman (1874–1930), novelist and playwright
- E. W. Hornung (1866–1921), author, A. J. Raffles
- Frances Horovitz (1938–1983), poet and broadcaster
- Michael Horovitz (1935–2021), poet and translator
- Anthony Horowitz (born 1956), novelist, children's writer and screenwriter
- William Horwood (born 1944), novelist and children's writer
- John Hoskins or Hoskyns (1566–1638), poet and politician
- Clare Hoskyns-Abrahall (1900–1990), biographer and children's writer
- Charlotte Hough (1924–2008), detective novelist and children's writer
- Richard Hough (also as Bruce Carter, 1922–1999), maritime historian and children's writer
- Stanley Bennett Hough (1917–1998), SF and thriller writer
- Stanley Houghton (1881–1913), playwright
- Geoffrey Household (1900–1988), novelist
- A. E. Housman (1859–1936), poet and scholar, A Shropshire Lad
- Laurence Housman (1865–1959), playwright
- Anne Howard (c. 1696–1764), poet
- Brian Howard (1905–1958), poet
- Edward Howard (1624 – c. 1700), playwright and poet
- Elizabeth Jane Howard (1923–2014), novelist
- Frederick Howard, 5th Earl of Carlisle, Earl of Carlisle (1748–1825), poet, playwright and pamphleteer
- Hartley Howard (real name Leopold Horace Ognall (1908–1979), also known as Harry Carmichael), crime novelist
- Henry Howard, Earl of Surrey (1517–1547), poet
- Henry Howard, Earl of Northampton (1540–1614), writer and courtier
- John Howard (1726–1790), philanthropist and reformer
- Robert Howard (1626–1698), playwright
- Sandra Howard (born 1940), novelist
- David Armine Howarth (1912–1991), historian and writer
- James Howell (1594–1666), Historiographer Royal and poet
- Francis Howgill (1618–1668), Quaker writer and preacher
- Anna Mary Howitt (1824–1884), poet, writer and painter
- Mary Howitt (1799–1888), poet and translator
- Richard Howitt (1799–1869), poet
- William Howitt (1792–1879), writer and traveller
- Edmond Hoyle (1672–1769), writer on games
- Fred Hoyle (1915–2001), astronomer and SF writer
- Geoffrey Hoyle (born 1942), SF writer
- Sisley Huddleston (1883–1952), writer and journalist
- Stephen Hudson (real name Sydney Schiff, 1868–1944), novelist and translator
- Pauline von Hügel (1858-1901), religious writer
- David Hughes (1930–2005), novelist and biographer
- Frieda Hughes (born 1960), children's writer, poet and painter
- Molly Hughes (1866–1956), writer and educator
- Richard Hughes (1900–1976), poet, novelist and playwright, A High Wind in Jamaica
- Shirley Hughes (1927–2022), children's writer and illustrator
- Ted Hughes (1930–1998), Poet Laureate, translator and anthologist
- Thomas Hughes (1822–1896), writer and novelist, Tom Brown's Schooldays
- E. M. Hull (real name Edith Maude Winstanley, 1880–1947), novelist
- Katharine Hull (1921–1977) and Pamela Whitlock (1920–1982), children's writers, The Far-Distant Oxus
- T. E. Hulme (1883–1917), critic and poet
- Michael Hulse (born 1955), translator, critic and poet
- Fergus Hume (1859–1932), novelist
- Tobias Hume (c. 1590–1645), musician and poet
- Helen Humphreys (born 1961), poet and novelist
- Neil Humphreys (born 1974), writer on Singapore
- Leigh Hunt (1784–1859), poet and essayist
- Jemima Hunt (born 1969), journalist and novelist
- Violet Hunt (1862–1942), novelist and biographer
- John Hunter (1737–1821), explorer, travel writer and naval officer
- Norman Hunter (1899–1995), children's novelist, Professor Branestawm
- Rachel Hunter (c. 1754–1813), novelist
- Richard Hurd, (1720–1808), writer, translator and bishop
- James Hurdis (1763–1801), poet and cleric
- Hyman Hurwitz (1770–1844), writer and scholar
- Dyneley Hussey (1893–1972), poet and music critic
- Sheila Hutchins (living), cookery-book writer
- A. S. M. Hutchinson (1880–1971), novelist
- John Hutchinson (1674–1737), theologian
- Lucy Hutchinson (1620–1681), biographer and translator
- R. C. Hutchinson (1907–1975), novelist
- Ralph Hutchinson (c. 1553–1606), scholar, AV translator and cleric
- Angela Huth (born 1938), novelist and playwright
- Leonard Hutten (c. 1557–1632), scholar, AV translator and cleric
- Catherine Hutton (1756–1846), novelist and correspondent
- William Hutton (1723–1815), poet and historian
- Richard Holt Hutton (1826–1897), writer and theologian
- Aldous Huxley (1894–1963), novelist and essayist, Brave New World
- Julian Huxley (1887–1975), zoologist, philosopher and science writer
- Leonard Huxley (1860–1933), writer, biographer and editor
- Thomas Henry Huxley (1825–1895), scientist and essayist
- Edward Hyde, Lord Clarendon (1609–1674), historian and statesman
- Liz Hyder (born 1976 or 1977), novelist
- Timothy Hyman (1946–2024), art writer
- Henry Hyndman (1842–1921), writer and politician

== I ==
- Eva Ibbotson (1925–2010), novelist and children's writer
- David Icke (born 1952), writer and public speaker
- Conn Iggulden (born 1971), novelist and children's writer
- Selwyn Image (1849–1930), poet, designer and cleric
- Elijah Impey (1732–1809), memoirist and judge
- Elizabeth Inchbald (1753–1821), novelist and playwright
- William Ralph Inge (known as Dean Inge, 1860–1954), writer, theologian and cleric
- Thomas Ingelend (fl. 1560), The Disobedient Child
- Jean Ingelow (1820–1897), poet and novelist
- Julia, Lady Inglis (1833–1904), diarist
- Simon Ings (born 1965), novelist and science writer
- Mick Inkpen (born 1952), children's writer and illustrator
- Hammond Innes (also as Ralph Hammond, 1919–1998), novelist and children's writer
- Samuel Ireland (1744–1800), writer and engraver
- William Henry Ireland (1775–1835), poet, novelist and forger
- David Irving (born 1938), Holocaust denier
- R. L. G. Irving (1877–1969), mountaineering writer
- Margaret Irwin (1889–1969), novelist and biographer
- Robert Irwin (1946–2024), historian, novelist and Arabist
- Nathaniel Isaacs (1808–1872), traveller and writer
- Christopher Isherwood (1904–1986), novelist, Goodbye to Berlin
- Kazuo Ishiguro (born 1954), novelist, An Artist of the Floating World
- Eric Ives (1931–2012), historian and biographer
- George Cecil Ives (1867–1950), poet, diarist and reformer
- Helen Ivory (born 1969), poet

== J ==
- Donald Jack (1924–2003), novelist, playwright and scriptwriter
- Benedict Jacka (living), YA novelist
- Catherine Jackson (1824–1891), historian and editor
- Mick Jackson (born 1960), novelist
- Alaric Jacob (1909–1995), novelist and journalist
- Anna Jacobs (born 1941), novelist
- Joseph Jacobs (1854–1916), folklorist and historian
- W. W. Jacobs (1863–1943), novelist and story writer, The Monkey's Paw
- Howard Jacobson (born 1942), novelist and journalist
- Brian Jacques (1939–2011), novelist
- Frances Jacson (1754–1842), novelist
- Richard Jago (1715–1781), poet and cleric
- Christopher James (born 1975), poet
- Elinor James (1644–1719), polemicist and printer
- G. P. R. James (1799–1860), novelist and Historiographer Royal
- M. R. James (1862–1936), story writer and scholar, Ghost Stories of an Antiquary
- P. D. James (1920–2014), novelist
- Robert Rhodes James (1933–1999), biographer, historian and politician
- Thomas James (1573–1629), librarian and poet
- William Milbourne James (1881–1973), writer, poet and admiral
- Anna Brownell Jameson (1794–1860), travel writer and art critic
- Storm Jameson (1891–1986), novelist and autobiographer
- James Janeway (1636–1674), children's writer
- Rosemary Hawley Jarman (1935–2015), novelist and story writer
- Claude Scudamore Jarvis (1879–1953), writer and naturalist
- Antony Jay (1930–2016), writer, broadcaster, and director
- John Cordy Jeaffreson (1831–1901), novelist and non-fiction writer
- Tim Jeal (born 1945), novelist and biographer
- James Hopwood Jeans (1877–1946), writer and astronomer
- Samuel Jebb (c. 1694–1772), scholar and physician
- Richard Jefferies (1848–1887), nature writer and essayist
- Agnes Jekyll (1861–1937), writer
- Gertrude Jekyll (1843–1932), garden writer
- Alan Jenkins (born 1955), poet
- Amy Jenkins (born 1966), novelist and screenwriter
- Peter Jenkins (1934–1992), journalist and screenwriter
- Elizabeth Jennings (1926–2001), poet
- Humphrey Jennings (1907–1950), writer and film maker
- Soame Jenyns (1704–1787), poet and essayist
- Edgar Jepson (also as R. Edison Page, 1863–1938), writer and novelist
- Selwyn Jepson (1899–1989), crime writer
- Jerome K. Jerome (1859–1927), humorist and playwright, Three Men in a Boat
- Douglas William Jerrold (1803–1857), playwright, novelist and essayist
- John Heneage Jesse (1809–1874), historian and poet
- William Stanley Jevons (1840–1882), economist and logician
- Geraldine Jewsbury (1812–1880), novelist and critic
- Maria Jane Jewsbury (1800–1833), poet and critic
- C. E. M. Joad (1891–1953), philosopher and broadcaster
- Elizabeth Jocelin (c. 1595–1622), writer on child-raising
- Rowan Joffé (born 1973), screenwriter
- W. E. Johns (1893–1968), novelist and pilot, Biggles
- B. S. Johnson (1933–1973), novelist and editor
- Lionel Johnson (1867–1902), poet and essayist
- Pamela Hansford Johnson (1912–1981), novelist, playwright and critic
- Richard Johnson (1573 – c. 1659), writer
- Samuel Johnson (1649–1703), pamphleteer and cleric
- Samuel Johnson, (1709–1784) writer, poet and lexicographer
- Kate Johnson (born c. 1980), writer
- Brian Jones (1938–2009), poet
- Charlotte Jones (living), playwright and actress
- David Jones (1895–1974), poet, writer and artist
- Daniel Jones (1881–1967), phonetician
- Diana Wynne Jones (1934–2011), novelist
- Ebenezer Jones (1820–1860), poet
- Ernest Charles Jones (1819–1869), poet, novelist and Chartist
- Henry Arthur Jones (1851–1929), playwright
- Lara Jones (1975–2010), children's writer Poppy Cat series
- Sadie Jones (born 1967), novelist
- Tobias Jones (living), writer
- William Jones (1726–1800), theologian and cleric
- William Jones (1746–1794), polyglot and poet
- Ben Jonson (1573–1637), poet and dramatist, Bartholomew Fair
- Robert Furneaux Jordan (1905–1978), crime writer and critic
- John Jortin (1698–1770), biographer and historian
- Jenny Joseph (1932–2018), poet and novelist
- Gabriel Josipovici (born 1940), novelist and critic
- John Josselyn (fl. 1638–1675), writer and traveller
- Benjamin Jowett (1817–1893), scholar and translator
- Graham Joyce (1954–2014), novelist and YA writer
- Alan Judd (born 1946), novelist and biographer
- Tony Judt (1948–2010), historian and political writer

== See also ==
- English literature
- English novel
- List of children's literature authors
- List of children's non-fiction writers
- List of English-language poets
- List of English novelists
- Lists of writers
