= Halliwell =

Halliwell is a surname. It may refer to:

== People ==
- Bryn Halliwell (born 1980), English football goalkeeper
- Danny Halliwell (born 1981), rugby league footballer who played in the 2000s and 2010s
- David Halliwell (1936–2006), British dramatist
- David Halliwell (cricketer) (born 1948), English former cricketer
- Eddie Halliwell, British disc jockey
- Edward Halliwell, 16th century playwright
- Ernest Halliwell (1864–1919), South African cricketer, son of Richard Halliwell
- Francis Halliwell, Archdeacon of Bombay from 1963 until 1965
- Geri Halliwell (born 1972), British singer
- Joe Halliwell (1892–1964), English footballer
- Joel Halliwell (1873–1956), British soldier, recipient of the Victoria Cross
- Kenneth Halliwell (1926–1967), British actor, writer and murderer
- Lauren Halliwell (born 1989), English ice hockey player
- Leslie Halliwell (1929–1989), British film critic, writer and chief buyer for the ITV network
- Richard Halliwell (disambiguation)
- Robert Halliwell (born 1948), Australian convicted drug trafficker
- Stephen Halliwell (classicist) (born 1953), British classicist and academic
- Steve Halliwell (1946–2023), English actor
- Steve Halliwell (rugby league) (born 1962), English born Australian rugby league footballer
- Thomas Halliwell (1900–1982), Anglican cleric and Principal of Trinity College Carmarthen

== Fictional characters ==
=== of Charmed ===
- Melinda Halliwell
- Penelope Halliwell
- Patricia Halliwell
- Prue Halliwell
- Piper Halliwell
- Phoebe Halliwell
- Paige Matthews, often misidentified as Paige Halliwell
- Wyatt Halliwell
- Chris Halliwell

=== of other works ===
- Alma Halliwell, in the UK soap opera Coronation Street

== See also ==
- James Halliwell-Phillipps (1820–1889), British Shakespearean scholar
- Halliwells, an English law firm from 2004 to 2010
- Halliwell Manuscript, a Masonic manuscript/poem
