= Katherine Jackson (disambiguation) =

Katherine Jackson (born 1930) is the matriarch of the Jackson family.

Katherine Jackson may also refer to:

- Catherine Jackson (1824–1891), author

== See also ==
- Kathy Jackson (born c. 1966), union leader
- Kate Jackson (disambiguation)
- Cath Jackson, British lesbian cartoonist
