= Woodend Gallery and Studios =

Art gallery in Scarborough, North Yorkshire, England

Coordinates: 54°16′42″N 0°24′08″W

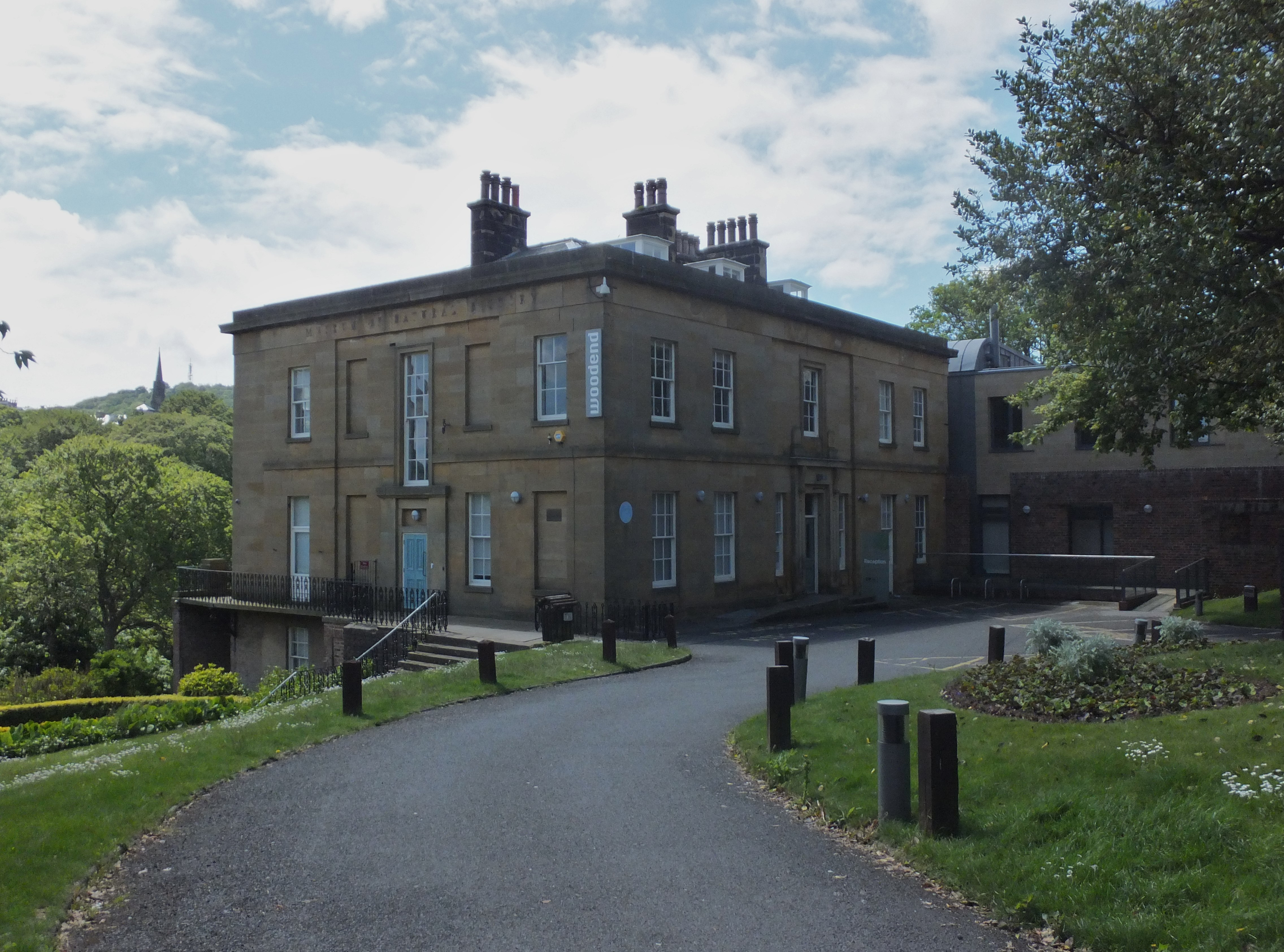
The gallery, in 2013

The Woodend Gallery and Studios is an art gallery in Scarborough, North Yorkshire, a town in England.

The building was constructed in the 1835, for the architect George Knowles. It was one of four villas, the others being Crescent House, Londesborough Lodge, and the White House. In 1870, it was purchased by the Sitwell family. The interior was later altered by George Sitwell.

In 1924, the house was purchased by Scarborough Corporation, which converted it into a natural history museum. It housed the collection donated by James Jonathan Harrison, which had previously been displayed in the town library. However, the museum did not open until 1951. The museum closed in the 1990s, with the exhibits placed in storage. Management of the building was passed to the Scarborough Museums Creative and Cultural Trust in 2005, and in 2007, the building was converted into the Creative Industries Centre, housing an art gallery and studios. The gallery hosts temporary exhibitions of contemporary art.

The building is constructed of stone with a string course, a cornice and a blocking course, and a hipped slate roof. There are two storeys and an attic, fronts of five bays, and a two-storey extension on the west. On the north front is a doorway with incised panelled pilasters, scroll brackets and a cornice, and the windows are sashes. The east front has a tall stair window, and on the south front is a continuous balcony on a segmental arched arcade. The building has been grade II* listed since 1953.

== See also ==
- Grade II* listed buildings in North Yorkshire (district)
- Listed buildings in Scarborough (Castle Ward)
