= Londesborough Lodge =

Building in Scarborough, North Yorkshire, England

Coordinates: 54°16′45″N 0°24′04″W

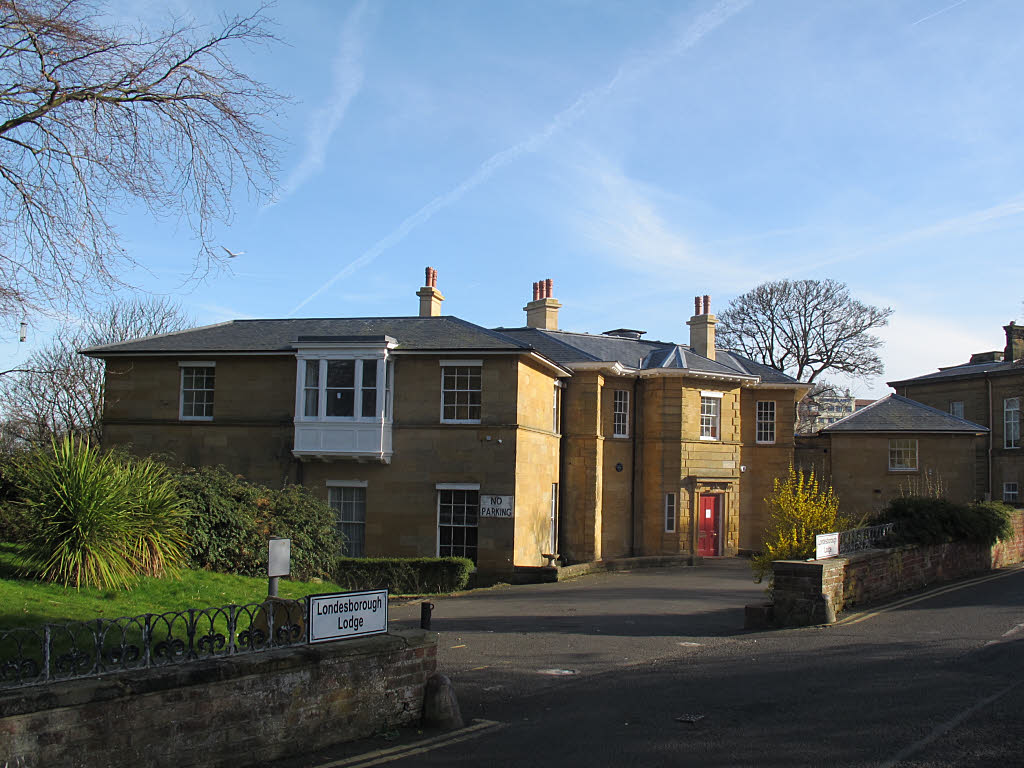
The building, in 2017

Londesborough Lodge is a historic building in Scarborough, North Yorkshire, a town in England.

The building was constructed in 1839, as one of four villas - the others being Crescent House, the White House, and Woodend House. It was originally named Warwick House, but in 1853 it was purchased by William Denison, 1st Earl of Londesborough and became popularly known by his name. He extended the house and altered the interior. Londesborough hosted the future King Edward VII in the house on several occasions. In 1925, the house was purchased by the Scarborough Corporation, and variously served as a tourist office, a museum and, between 1929 and 1974, Victorian-style Turkish baths. In 1983, it became a district office of BBC Radio York, which remained there until 2009. It has since served as the Kagyu Samye Dzong Scarborough Tibetan Buddhist Centre. The building has been grade II listed since 1973.

The house is built of stone and has bracketed moulded overhanging eaves and a shallow hipped slate roof. It has two storeys and an irregular plan, consisting of a projecting main block with three bays, and splayed wings with one bay each. The doorway has panelled pilaster strips and a cornice on console brackets, and the windows are sashes. The garden front has a canted projection with a balcony.

== See also ==
- Listed buildings in Scarborough (Castle Ward)
