= Listed buildings in Roecliffe =

Roecliffe is a civil parish in the county of North Yorkshire, England. It contains four listed buildings that are recorded in the National Heritage List for England. Of these, one is listed at Grade II*, the middle of the three grades, and the others are at Grade II, the lowest grade. The parish contains the village of Roecliffe and the surrounding area. All the listed buildings are in the village, and consist of two farmhouses, a church, and a school with a school house.

== Key ==
Grade	Criteria
II*	Particularly important buildings of more than special interest
II	Buildings of national importance and special interest

== Buildings ==
Name and location	Photograph	Date	Notes	Grade
Manor Farmhouse; 54.08715°N 1.42755°W		Early 18th century	The farmhouse is in brick, with stone quoins, a floor band and a pantile roof. There are two storeys and four bays. The doorway has an oblong fanlight, and the windows are sashes in flush wood architraves. At the rear is a tall blocked window under a moulded brick pediment.	II
Vicarage Farmhouse; 54.08732°N 1.42591°W	—	18th century	The farmhouse is in red brick, with a projecting floor band, and a pantile roof with an eaves course of stone slates. There are two storeys and three wide bays. The doorway has a cambered brick arch, and there are two blocked doorways. The windows are sashes with slightly cambered heads.	II
St Mary's Church; 54.08872°N 1.42726°W		1843	The church, which is redundant, was designed by R. H. Sharp. It is built in limestone with a tile roof, and consists of a nave and a chancel in one cell, and a northeast vestry. On the west gable is a bellcote. The south doorway has a round arch with two orders, and is flanked by paired columns, and the windows have moulded surrounds and round-arched heads.	II*
School and school house 54.08785°N 1.42595°W		1874	The school is in dark red brick with stone dressings and tile roof. There are two storeys, and the school consists of a four-bay main range with a porch and a bell tower, and a cross-wing at each end with fretted bargeboards. The windows are mullioned and transomed, those in the gables with pointed heads, and there are two gabled dormers. The bell tower is polygonal and has a timber bellcote stage and a spirelet. The house to the right, and at right angles, has two storeys and three bays, the outer bays jettied and gabled. On the ground floor are cross windows, and the upper floor contains three-light mullioned windows.	II
