= Richard Hey Sharp =

- Born: 2 June 1793; Gildersome, Yorkshire, England
- Died: 25 February 1853 (aged 59); Heworth Moor, York, England
- Occupation: Architect

Richard Hey Sharp (2 June 1793 – 25 February 1853) was an English architect based in York and responsible for the design, repair and construction of a number of iconic Yorkshire buildings.

== Early life ==
Richard Hey Sharp was born in 1793 to Richard Sharp and Mary (née Turton) and baptised in Batley two days later. Richard was the eldest of five children including the surgeon and promoter of museums William Sharp and Samuel Sharp who followed his brother into a career in architecture. Initially living in Gildersome, the family had moved to Armley by the end of the 18th century where his father was a drysalter. The Sharps were from an ancient Yorkshire family which included the mathematician Abraham Sharp, the Archbishop of York John Sharp, Archdeacon of Northumbria Thomas Sharp, the surgeon William Sharp and the abolitionist Granville Sharp. Richard's paternal grandmother, Sarah Hey, was the sister of the surgeon and twice mayor of Leeds William Hey, theologian John Hey and academic and essayist Richard Hey.

== Career ==
He travelled on the Continent between 1816 and 1819 and was a pupil of the York architect Peter Atkinson with whom he went into partnership on his return. Atkinson and Sharp had an office in Fetter Lane, York until the partnership was dissolved in 1826 after which he set up on his own, before going into business with his younger brother Samuel in the early 1830s, until that partnership was dissolved in 1845. Following that, he worked with Thomas Spence Hardy, who returned to Lincoln, after Sharp's death.

== Works ==
The following is a list of some of Sharp's works:

- 1821: Gothic canopy over the font in the Parish Church Wakefield (Wakefield Cathedral)
- 1823–1826: Church of St. Mark, Leeds (with Peter Atkinson)
- 1824–1825: Purey-Cust Chambers, York
- 1829: Rotunda Museum, Scarborough
- 1827–1830: Yorkshire Museum, York (interior details)
- 1830: Plans for the Crescent, Scarborough
- 1832: Trinity House, Scarborough
- 1834: Hull Assembly Rooms (now the Hull New Theatre)
- 1837: Swimming Baths, Museum Gardens, York.
- 1843: St Mary's Church, Roecliffe
- 1844–45: Rebuild of the north and south aisles of St Saviour's Church, York

== Death ==
Richard Hey Sharp died at his home at Heworth Moor, York, in 1853, aged 60.
