= Anne Whitehead =

English Quaker preacher, c. 1624–1686

- Born: Anne Downer c.1624 Charlbury
- Died: 28 July 1686; Middlesex
- Known for: early Quaker
- Spouse: George Whitehead
- Parent(s): Thomas and Mary Downer

Anne Whitehead or Anne Downer; Anne Greenwell (c. 1624 – 28 July 1686) was an English Quaker organizer, preacher and writer. She underwent severe distraints for her beliefs.

== Life and work ==
Whitehead was born in Charlbury in about 1624 to Thomas and Mary Downer. Her father was vicar and her maternal grandfather is thought to have been Ralph Hutchinson, who was a biblical scholar and college head at Oxford University.

== Quakerism ==
Quakerism spread during Oliver Cromwell's Commonwealth that followed the English Civil War. Anne Downer moved to London and joined the Religious Society of Friends there in 1654.

In 1655 she became the first female Quaker preacher, for which she was imprisoned and beaten. In 1656 she preached in Chadlington, and then went to Launceston prison in Cornwall to serve as secretary to the Quaker leader George Fox. She then preached in her home town of Charlbury, where Quaker meetings were held in the homes of William Cole and Alexander Harris. Both men were jailed in 1657–1658 for refusing to pay tithes to the Church of England; Cole died in prison.

Many Quakers in Charlbury were distrained for refusing to pay the Church Rate. In 1660 a Chadlington Quaker who attended the Charlbury meetings was jailed for refusing to swear the Oath of Allegiance, and in 1663 Henry Shad, a Quaker schoolmaster, was barred from teaching.

Anne Whitehead played a significant role within London Quakers’ women’s meetings, promoting piety, plainness, and older Friends teaching younger members Quaker values. She campaigned for an end to the persecution of Quakers, writing for both Quakers and non-Quakers, including For the King and both houses of Parliament. Much of her work was on the role of women within the Quaker community.

== Personal life ==
She married Quaker Benjamin Greenwell on 24 March 1663. He was imprisoned in Newgate prison under a sentence of banishment, dying there on 5 February 1665. The couple had no children.

In 1670 she married George Whitehead at the Peel meeting of Quakers in Clerkenwell. Her new husband was a Quaker preacher who had been imprisoned, whipped and placed in the stocks because of his religion. He later described her as 'like a Tender Mother' to him.

Anne Whitehead died in Middlesex in 1686. Her husband George to publish a collection of personal testimonies to her memory, Piety Promoted by Faithfulness (1686). Among those to laud her was Mary Forster in her 1686 work Piety Promoted. She was posthumously referred to as a “mother in Israel”.

== Sources ==
- Crossley, Alan; Colvin, Christina; Cooper, Janet; Cooper, N. H.; Harvey, P. D. A.; Hollings, Marjory; Hook, Judith; Jessup, Mary; Lobel, Mary D.; Mason, J. F. A.; Trinder, B.S.; Turner, Hilary (1972). A History of the County of Oxford. Victoria County History. Vol. 10: Banbury Hundred. London: Oxford University Press for the Institute of Historical Research. pp. 127–157. ISBN 978-0-19722-728-2.
