= St Mary's Church, Roecliffe =

Church in North Yorkshire, England

Coordinates: 54.0885°N 1.4277°W

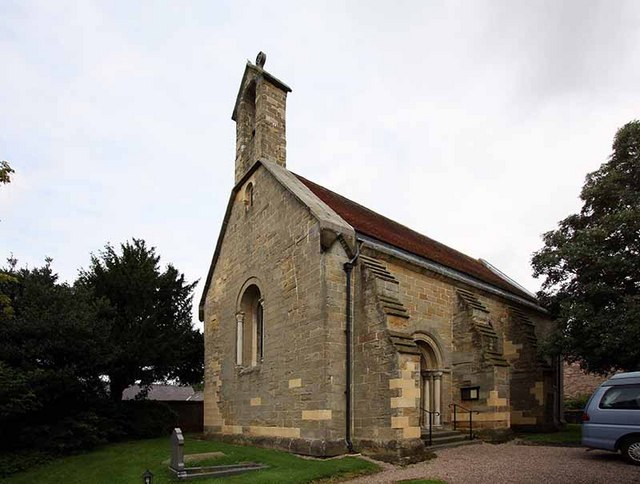
- St Mary's Church seen from the south

- Location in North Yorkshire
- OS grid reference: SE375659
- Location: Roecliffe, North Yorkshire
- Country: England
- Denomination: Church of England
- Website: Churches Conservation Trust

History
- Dedication: St Mary

Architecture
- Functional status: Redundant
- Heritage designation: Grade II*
- Designated: 15 March 1966
- Architect: RH Sharp
- Architectural type: Church
- Style: Romanesque Revival
- Completed: 1843

Specifications
- Materials: Limestone, red tile roof

St Mary's Church is a redundant Church of England parish church in the village of Roecliffe, North Yorkshire, England (grid reference SE375659). It is a Grade II* listed building and is in the care of the Churches Conservation Trust.

== History ==
The church was built in 1843 for Andrew Lawson of Aldborough Manor. It was designed by the York architect RH Sharp. It is built of stone from an old Roman quarry in the grounds of Aldborough Manor, and from a quarry at Cotgrove, while the stone for the internal arch was from Burton Leonard. In the 1870s large buttresses were added to the north and south walls. St Mary's was declared redundant on 1 April 1983, and was vested in the Trust on 5 June 1986.

== Architecture ==
=== Structure ===
St Mary's is built of limestone with a red tile roof and is in Romanesque Revival style. Its plan consists of a single cell comprising a three-bay nave, a shallow chancel, and a north-east vestry. On the west gable is a bellcote with a pitched roof and a single bell. The doorway is on the south side in the westernmost bay and consists of a round arch with two orders supported by a pair of columns on each side. There are three buttresses on the south wall and two on the north wall. All the windows are round-headed with roll-moulding, those in the chancel being narrower than elsewhere. The west window is flanked by colonnettes. The roof is barrel vaulted. Five black-and-white marble steps, formerly in York Minster, lead up to the chancel.

=== Fittings and furniture ===
The church contains much early woodwork moved from elsewhere. The octagonal pulpit is Jacobean in style and was moved here from Holy Trinity Church, Hull. The 15th-century vestry door, containing carved tracery, came from York Minster. The source of the other woodwork is unknown. This includes a panelled reading desk, pews dated 1619, and linenfold panelling on the east wall. The pews are arranged along three walls in the style of a college chapel. The communion table dates from the 17th century. The doorway leading to the vestry has an ogee head, and the vestry contains more early carved woodwork. A frieze contains biblical scenes, including the Nativity, the Flight into Egypt, David and Goliath, and Salome. Other carving in the vestry depicts the heads of putti, and classical capitals. In the corner of the vestry is a round-arched fireplace, its voussoirs crudely carved with human faces and animals.

== Present day ==
Despite its being redundant, services are still held occasionally in the church, and it is used as a venue for concerts.

== See also ==
- Grade II* listed churches in North Yorkshire (district)
- Listed buildings in Roecliffe
- List of churches preserved by the Churches Conservation Trust in Northern England
