= Roecliffe =

Village and civil parish in North Yorkshire, England

Coordinates: 54.088°N 1.426°W

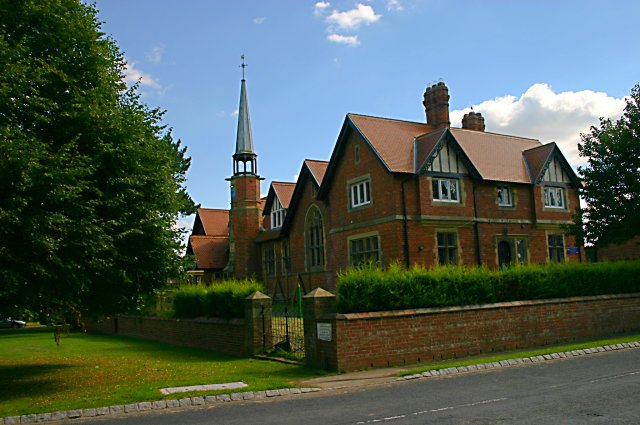
- Roecliffe's Church of England primary school

- Location within North Yorkshire
- Population: 238 (2011 census)
- OS grid reference: SE 375 655
- Civil parish: Roecliffe
- Unitary authority: North Yorkshire
- Ceremonial county: North Yorkshire
- Region: Yorkshire and the Humber
- Country: England
- Sovereign state: United Kingdom
- Post town: York
- Postcode district: YO51
- Dialling code: 01757
- Police: North Yorkshire
- Fire: North Yorkshire
- Ambulance: Yorkshire
- UK Parliament: Skipton and Ripon

Roecliffe is a village and civil parish in the county of North Yorkshire, England. It is situated near the A1 road motorway which connects London with Edinburgh and is 1 mile west of Boroughbridge. It is on the banks of the River Ure and the village centres on the village green which doubles up as the school playing field.

The village has a pub, The Crown Inn, which offers 5 star accommodation with a 16th-century theme. The village itself is surrounded by scenic views with St Mary's Church, Roecliffe as its main attraction in the heart of the village. The church is believed to be the only church in the country with an entirely vaulted roof. Close to Roecliffe are the Yorkshire Dales and the Yorkshire Dales National Park, which are known for spectacular scenery and a range of wildlife habitats. Also close by is the village Skelton-on-Ure.

== History ==
The name Roecliffe derives from the Old Norse rauðr meaning red, and the Old English clif meaning 'cliff'.

Excavations in 1993 uncovered two 1st-century Roman forts at Roecliffe, located where the modern A1(M) crosses the River Ure. It is believed that the forts were short-lived and were abandoned in favour of Aldborough, 1 mile east.

Roecliffe was historically a township in the parish of Aldborough in the West Riding of Yorkshire. It became a separate civil parish in 1866. In 1974 Roecliffe was transferred from the West Riding to the new county of North Yorkshire. From 1974 to 2023 it was part of the Borough of Harrogate, it is now administered by the unitary North Yorkshire Council.

Until 1 October 1998, Roecliffe was part of the Claro Registration District. It now comes under the North Yorkshire registration district Harrogate.

In the 1870s, Roecliffe was described as:

"ROCLIFF, or Roecliff, a township-chapelry in Aldborough parish, W. R. Yorkshire; on the river Ure, 1½mile W S W of Boroughbridge r. station. Post-town, Boroughbridge, under York. Acres, 1, 794. Real property, £2, 497. Pop., 231. Houses, 53."

== Population ==
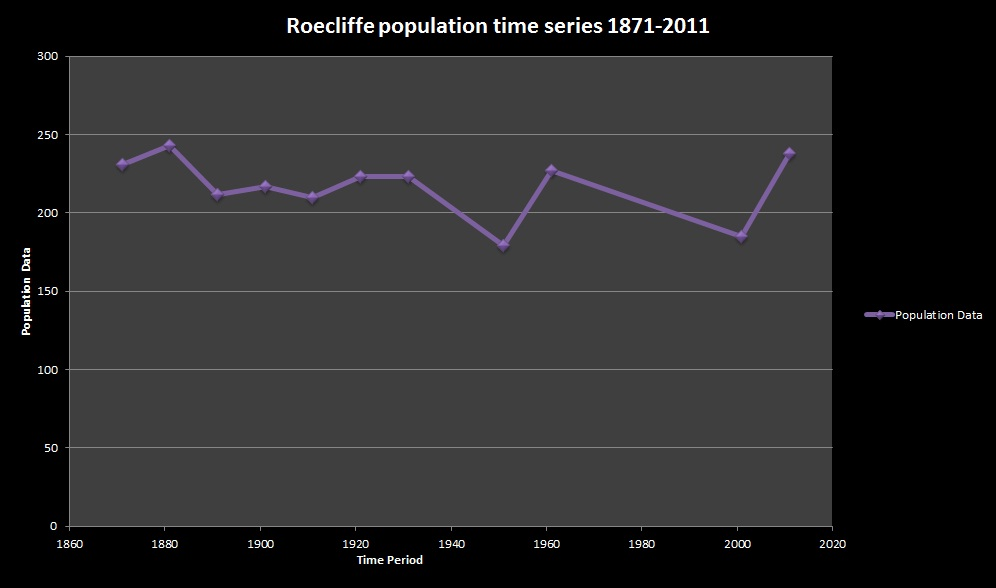
Total population of Roecliffe Civil Parish, North Yorkshire, as reported by the Census of Population from 1871 to 2011

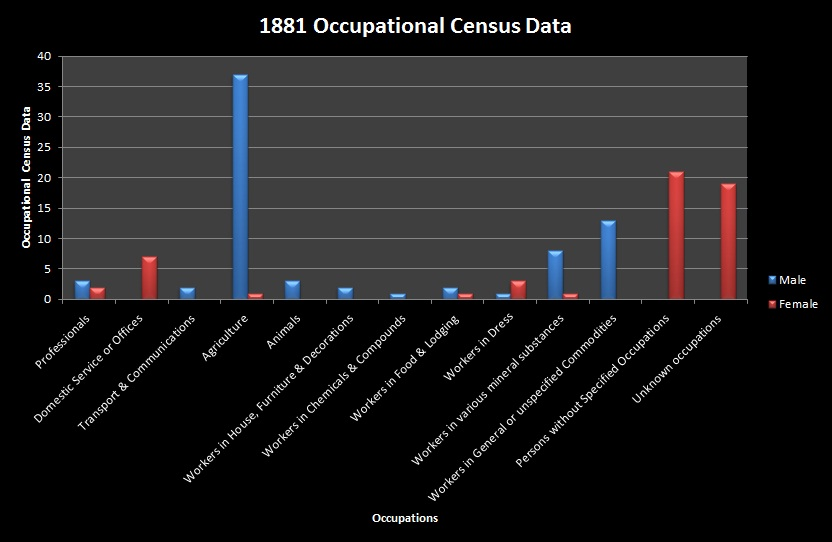
1881 Gender based occupational census data

The population in the area has always been small and as of the 2011 census was 238. This as shown has fluctuated over time with its most significant decrease in the 1950s where it merely reached 150. Although fluctuations occurred over the years, the population in 2011 is very similar to what it was in 1871.

In the past agriculture and general workers were the most common occupation for males. Most females with declared occupations worked in domestic service.

=== Transport ===
Roecliffe has one bus service which runs from Ripon to Harrogate. The nearest railway station is at Knaresborough.

=== Education ===
Roecliffe has one school, Roecliffe Church of England School, a primary school, which has outstanding Ofsted reports. The village green provides a recreation area. Secondary school education can be found nearby in Harrogate. Harrogate High School is a mixed school for children aged 11 to 18 and has approximately 720 students.

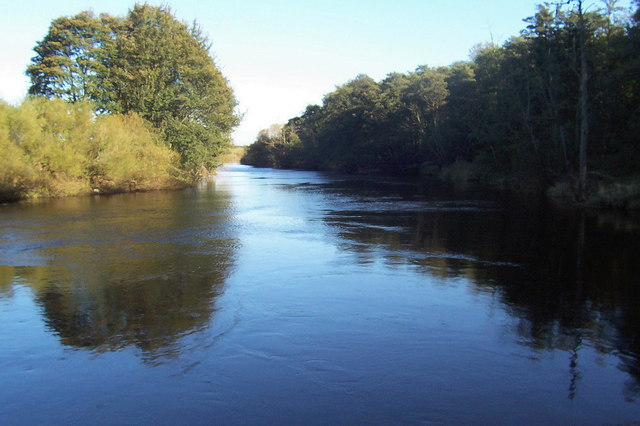
Cherry Island Wood

=== Roecliffe's Pond and Meadows ===
The area close to the River Ure was once a clay pit in the 19th century, and has been transformed into a private nature reserve. The Roecliffe Ramble is a walk from the village starting at the church and along the River Ure passing locks and Newby Hall (an eighteenth-century country house situated on the banks of the river).

== Weather and terrain ==
Roecliffe is flat surrounded by hilly countryside and close by the upland area of the Yorkshire Dales, as a result the weather is unpredictable. The coldest month is January where temperatures reach five degrees with the likelihood of snow and barely reaches twenty degrees in the warmest months July and August. The Pennines *-protect the villages below from the prevailing wind and therefore they only see around 150 days of rain on average per annum. This means that in general there is more sunshine than rainfall in the area.

== See also ==
- Listed buildings in Roecliffe
- Newby Hall
