= Kate Jackson (disambiguation) =

Kate Jackson (born 1948) is an American actress and filmmaker.

Kate Jackson may also refer to:

- Kate Jackson (author) (born 1972), herpetologist
- Kate Jackson (fighter) (born 1986), British mixed martial artist
- Kate Jackson (politician) in Massachusetts House of Representatives elections, 2006
- Kate Jackson (singer) (born 1979), lead singer of the UK indie band The Long Blondes

== See also ==
- Katherine Jackson (disambiguation)
