= William Hampton (poet) =

British poet (born 1959)

- Born: 1959 (age 66–67); Salford, Lancashire
- Known for: Poetry
- Notable work: The Twenty Second Memory of Goldfish; The Rialto
- Awards: Winner of the 2004 Bridport Prize. 3rd place in the 2004 Cardiff International Competition.

William Hampton (born 1959 in Salford, Lancashire) is a British poet.

== Life ==
William took a degree in Religion with Literature from Bristol University. Since then he has worked in magazine publishing, nature conservation and community care. He lives in Colchester, and works for Scope, the charity for people with cerebral palsy.

William's first published poem was in The Rialto. His work has appeared in various magazines, most recently Boomerang and the website devoted to Plumlive.

== Awards ==
He came 3rd in the 2004 Cardiff International Competition, and won the 2004 Bridport Prize. He was in the anthology for the Arvon Competition in 2000.

== Works ==
- The Twenty Second Memory of Goldfish
