= Cath Jackson =

British lesbian cartoonist (born 1957)

- Born: 1957 (age 67–68); London, UK
- Occupation: Cartoonist
- Years active: 1980–present
- Notable work: Nurse Nightshade; Vera the Visible Lesbian; Wonder Wimbin

Cath Jackson (born 1957) is a British lesbian cartoonist who was primarily active in the 1980s and 1990s. The subject of her cartoons were of a socio-political nature and accompanied articles and other artistic works that spoke for women's health and rights.

== Career ==
Cath Jackson started her career in the early 1980s as a cub journalist on International Construction Magazine and later transitioned to being a freelance cartoonist. Her artistic focus, as a lesbian cartoonist, was largely centred on political activism and questioning feminist positions. Jackson began producing comic strips in 1981 for magazines such as Nursing Times and City Limits. The New Statesman, a British magazine well known for its upfront and confrontational outlook on global politics, also displayed her work on its cover of 26 July 1985. In addition, she drew cartoons for an aids instructional pamphlet targeted at women and produced by the Terrence Higgins Trust.

She began contributing to Trouble and Strife in Spring 1984 and she regularly helped produce the magazine until the summer of 1993. Trouble and Strife generated articles that advocated for "radical feminism" from 1983 to 2002. In 2014 Jackson returned as an illustrator for the magazine on the topic of anti-gay legislation at the Sochi Olympics. Some of her cartoons from these publications were later reproduced on post cards for Cath Tate Cards. Jackson met Cath Tate through a mutual acquaintance that worked for the novelty book store Silvermoon. During the 1990s Jackson was featured in several anthologies produced by Roz Warren, all of which were themed on contemporary lesbian and women's humour.

== Publications ==
=== Books ===
- Visibly Vera (1986)
- Wonder Wimbin: Everyday Stories of Feminist Folk (1984)

=== Anthologies ===
- Women Draw (1984)
- The Best Contemporary Women's Humor (1994)
- Dyke strippers: lesbian cartoonists A to Z (1995)
- Kitty Libber (1998)

=== Contributions ===
- Nursing Times (1984)
- Trouble and Strife No. 2 (Spring 1984)
- Trouble and Strife No. 3 (Summer 1984)
- Trouble and Strife No. 4 (Winter 1984)
- Trouble and Strife No. 5 (Spring 1985)
- Trouble and Strife No. 6 (Summer 1985)
- Trouble and Strife No. 7 (Winter 1985)
- Trouble and Strife No. 8 (Spring 1986)
- Trouble and Strife No. 9 (Summer 1986)
- Trouble and Strife No. 10 (Spring 1987)
- Trouble and Strife No. 11 (Summer 1987)
- Trouble and Strife No. 12 (Winter 1987)
- Trouble and Strife No. 13 (Spring 1988)
- Trouble And Strife No. 14 (Winter 1988)
- Trouble and Strife No. 16 (Spring 1989)
- Trouble and Strife No. 17 (Summer 1989)
- Trouble and Strife No. 18 (Winter 1989)
- Trouble and Strife No. 19 (Spring 1990)
- Trouble and Strife No. 20 (Summer 1990)
- Trouble and Strife No. 21 (Spring 1991)
- Trouble and Strife No. 22 (Summer 1991)
- Trouble and Strife No. 23 (Winter 1991/1992)
- Trouble and Strife No. 24 (Summer 1992)
- Trouble and Strife No. 25 (Winter 1992/1993)
- Trouble and Strife No. 26 (Spring 1993)
- Women and Aids: 3rd edition (1987)

== Recognition ==
- She was featured in the book The Inking Woman: 250 years of women cartoon and comic artists in Britain (Myriad Editions, 2018), which compiled the works from the 2017 art exhibit held at the Cartoon Museum in London.
