= Rebecca Hey =

English botanical artist and poet

- Born: Rebecca Roberts; 1797; Leeds
- Died: 1859; Leeds
- Known for: Artist, poet, botanical illustrator, writer

Rebecca Hey, The Moral of Flowers (1833)

Rebecca Hey (née Roberts), also known as Mrs Hey, (1797–1859) was an English botanical artist and poet.

== Biography ==
Rebecca Hey was born in Leeds and baptised at St. Peter on 21 April 1797. She was the third daughter of merchant Thomas Roberts and Esther Lucy. She married William Hey III (1796-1875) in 1821. He was an apothecary-surgeon, who became principal surgeon at Leeds General Infirmary in 1830, and with other medical practitioners set up the Leeds School of Medicine in 1831. William Hey was one of the original 300 Fellows of the Royal College of Surgeons in 1843.

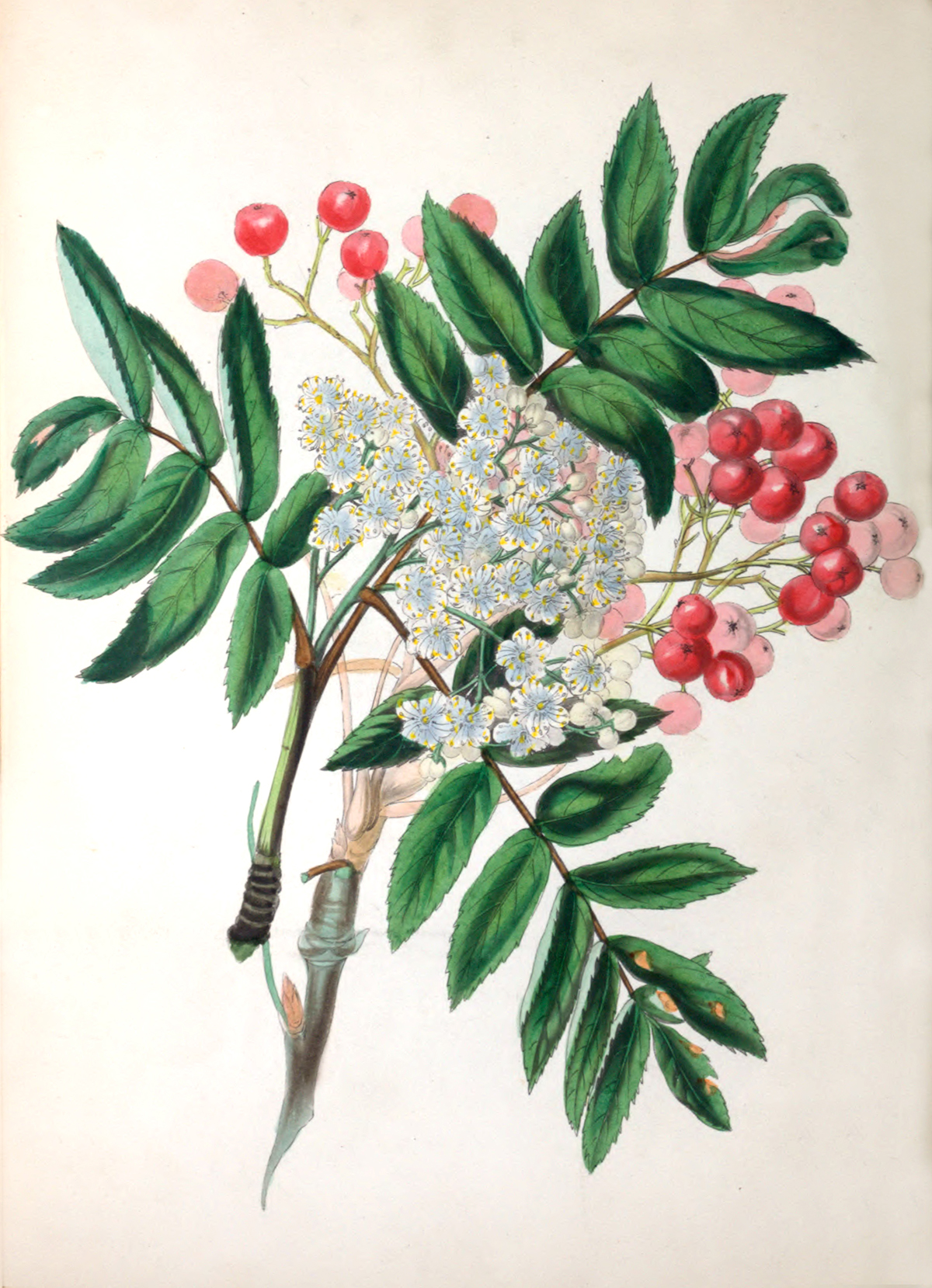
Plate from Sylvan Musings; or The Spirit of the Woods by Rebecca Hey (1837)

Rebecca Hey's first book was called The Moral of Flowers, which was an encyclopaedia of English flowers. Each article was written by her and was preceded by a colour engraving of a painting of the flower by artist William Clark, former draughtsman and engraver of the London Horticultural Society. In the preface Hey credits the authors Sir J. E. Smith and Mr Drummond for the botanical information included in the descriptions. Moral of Flowers focuses on flower poems that convey religious and moral messages, with a modest amount of botanical information including flowers' scientific names. Hey’s purpose is to “draw such a moral from each flower that is introduced as its appearance, habits, or properties might be supposed to suggest". The book was popular and was reprinted in 1835 and 1849.

Hey's next book was an encyclopaedia of trees, this time using her own paintings as well as her poems. Her works were originally published anonymously.

Her final publication Holy Places, and Other Poems focused more on religion and the proceeds from the book went to Special Missions in India.

== Selected works ==
- The Moral of Flowers (London: Longman, Rees, Orme, Brown, Green & Longman, 1833)
- Sylvan Musings; or The Spirit of the Woods (London: Longman, Brown, Green & Longmans, 1837)
- Recollections of the Lakes, and Other Poems (London: Tilt & Bogue, 1841)
- Holy Places, and Other Poems (London: J. Hatchard, 1859)
