= Scarborough Art Gallery =

Art gallery in Scarborough, North Yorkshire, England

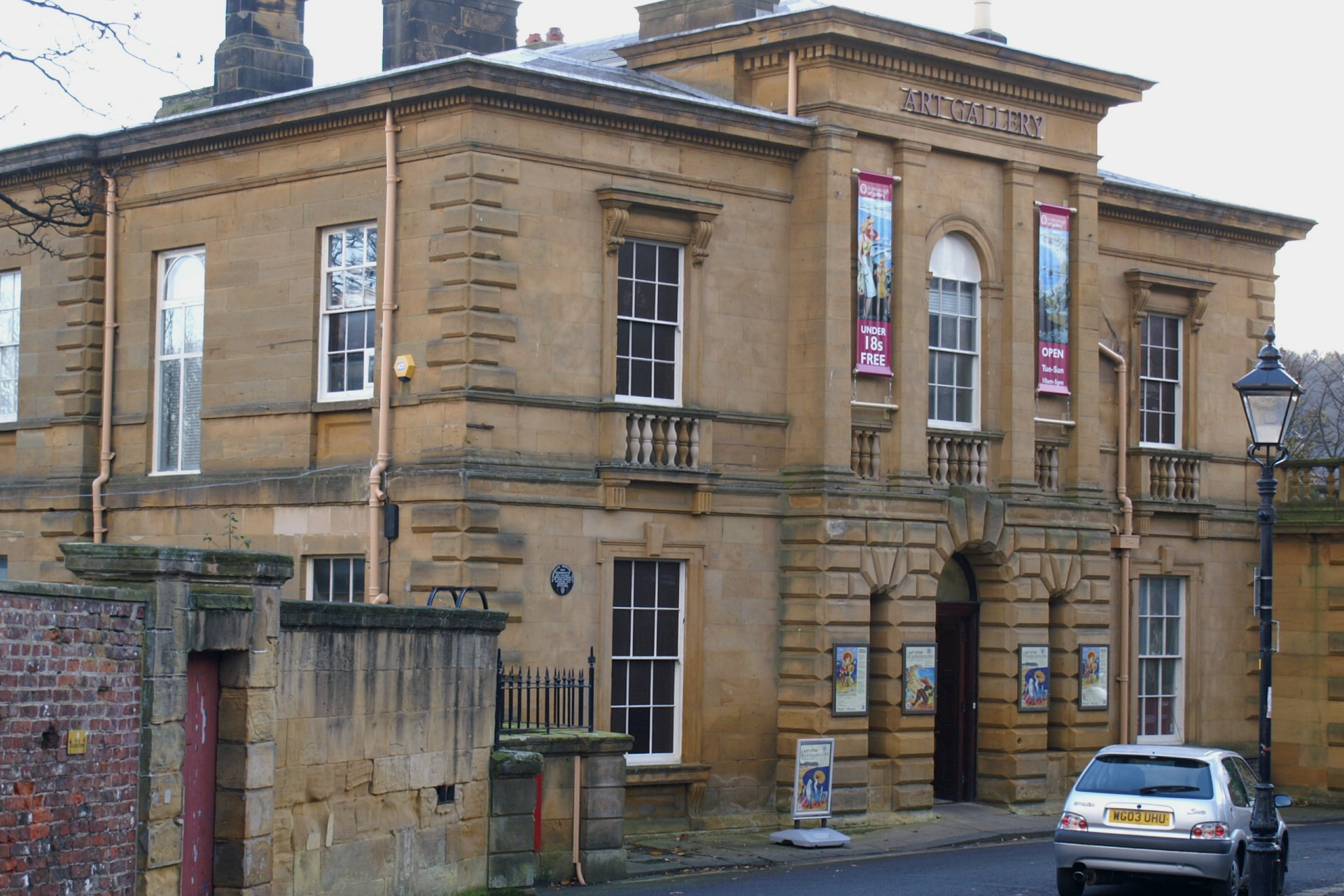

- Location within North Yorkshire
- Established: 1947
- Location: The Crescent, YO11 2PW
- Coordinates: 54.2787375°N 0.4015305°W
- Type: Art museum
- Website: www.scarboroughmuseumstrust.com

Scarborough Art Gallery is an art gallery in the town of Scarborough, in North Yorkshire, England. It is housed in a Grade II* Italianate villa in Scarborough's Crescent, designed by Richard Hey Sharp (1793–1853). The gallery is administered by the Scarborough Museums Trust and is open to the public. Its permanent collection has been developed over the past seventy years through gifts, bequests and purchases.

== Art in the Scarborough Art Gallery ==
The permanent collection includes paintings donated by famous hotelier Tom Laughton (1903–1984), the brother of the film star and actor Charles Laughton. Artists such as John Atkinson Grimshaw, John Jackson, Matthew Smith and Frank Brangwyn are represented in the collection.

A number of the works held are by artists connected to Scarborough School of Art – in particular, its head, Albert Strange and his students Richard Edward Clarke and William Littlewood.

Both Eric Ravilious and Edward Bawden, who were close friends, became acquainted with Tom Laughton, who acted as a patron, particularly to Bawden and commissioned pieces from him to adorn his hotels. The Peep Show in the collection was commissioned by Laughton as a plaything for guests at The Royal Hotel. Pieces by John Armstrong are also part of the Laughton gift, some of which were purchased by Tom and some by his brother Charles for their hotels, The Royal and The Pavilion.

The idea that the Scarborough Art Gallery should become a repository for the Printmakers Council archive was first proposed in the early 1990s and the first deposition arrived in 1992. In December 2016 the Printmakers Council agreed to deposit new material on a biennial basis. The range of modern prints includes works by John Piper, Elizabeth Blackadder, Ossip Zadkine and Kenneth Rowntree. The collection also contains posters centred on the town of Scarborough, designed by a variety of artists for the London and North Eastern Railway.

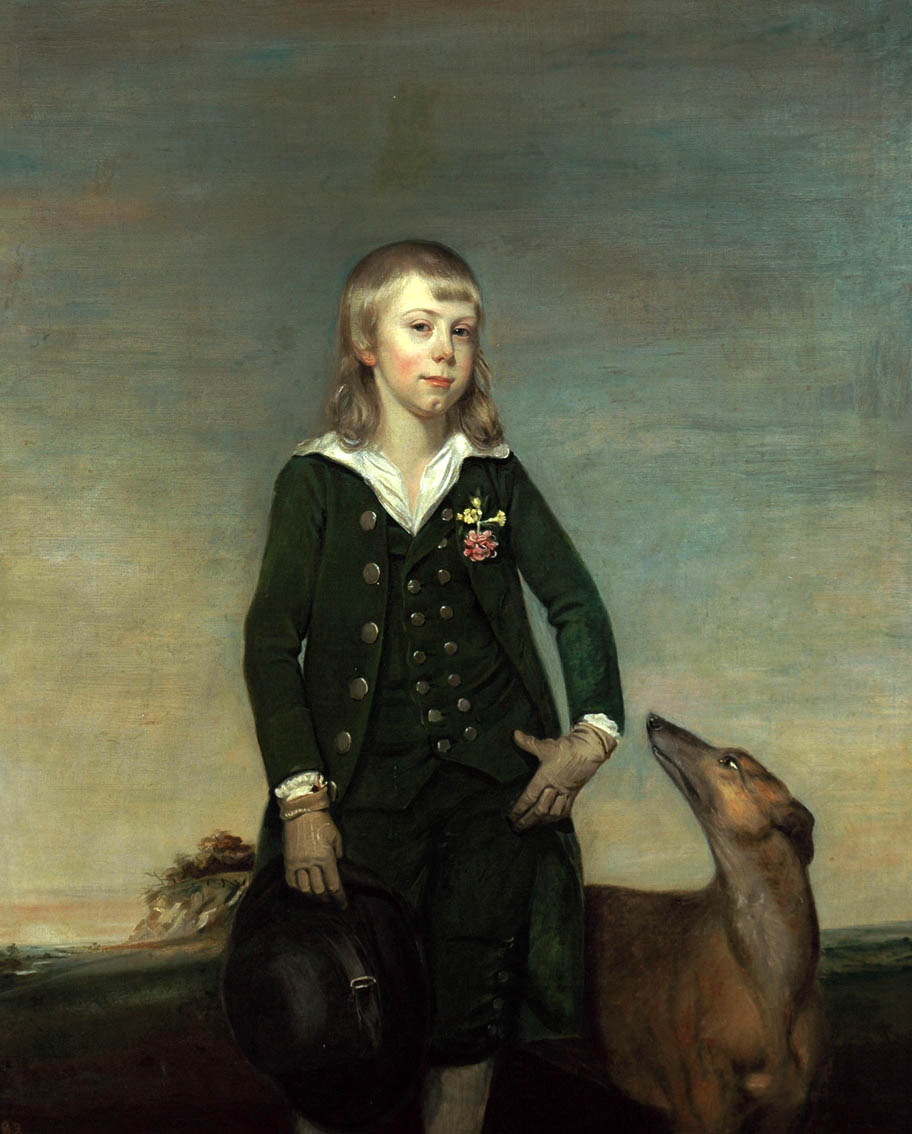
Thomas Gainsborough (attributed to), Richard Darley, 1783. Scarborough Collections.

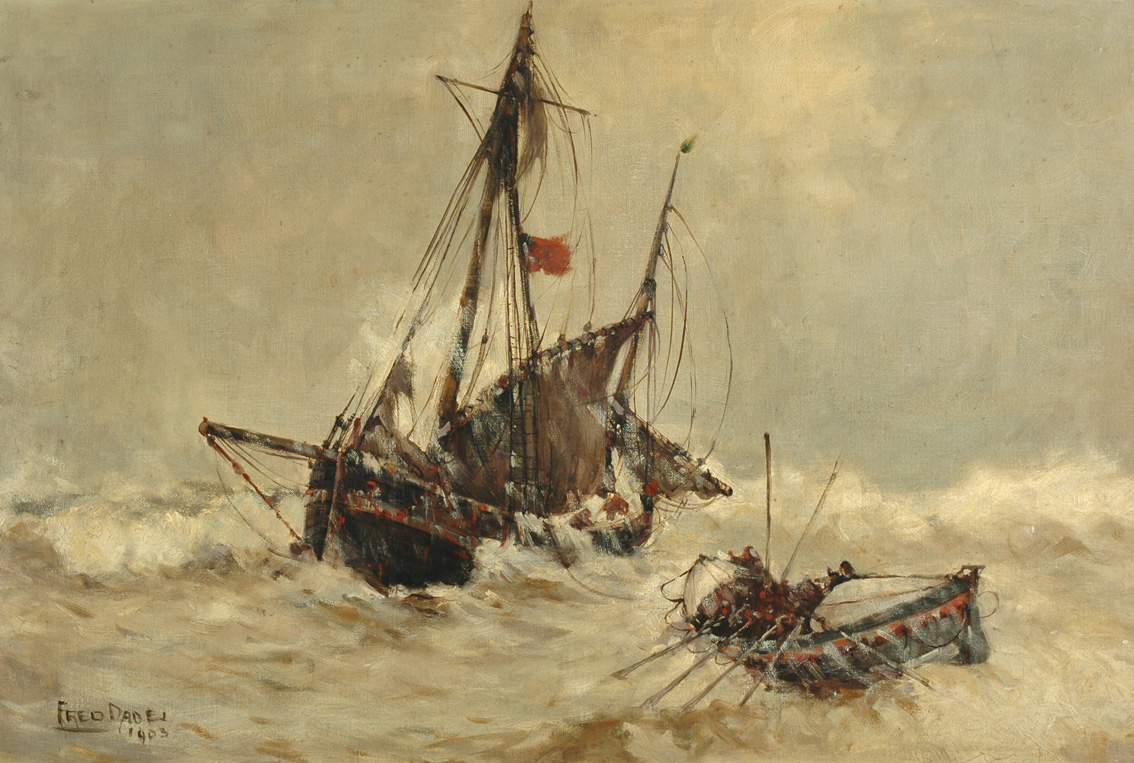
Frederick Dade, Fishing Boat with Lifeboat, 1903. Scarborough Collections.

== History of the Gallery ==
The history of the building which today houses Scarborough Art Gallery began in 1828, when local solicitor and Town Clerk, John Uppleby, in partnership with local builders John Barry and his brother William, bought the land on which The Crescent would be built from the wealthy local banker and shipowner, John Tindall. In 1830, the York architect Richard Hey Sharp (who also designed Scarborough's Rotunda Museum) and his brother Samuel were commissioned to draw up plans for the site. Building in what was to become The Crescent started in 1833 and the two terraces (The Crescent and Belvoir Terrace) were erected to the original design, although the plans for the site originally had seven villas to the south rather than the current four.

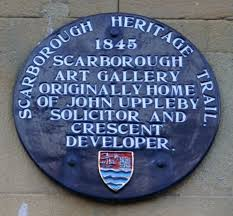
Scarborough Art Gallery plaque

Crescent Villa was the last of the villas to be built, erected in 1845 as a home for John Uppleby and his family. After John's death in 1856, his wife and family continued to live in the house until her death in 1881, at which time it was bought by Edward Chivers Bower, father of the sculptor Lady Ethel Alice Chivers Harris and the great-grandfather of Katharine, Duchess of Kent. Bower renamed the house 'Broxholme' after his family seat near Doncaster. The house stayed in the Bower family until 1904 when it was sold to Miss Mary Evelyn Maud Crompton Stansfield, whose family claimed ancestral connections to the diarist John Evelyn. Miss Stansfield used the house as a summer residence and let it out for the rest of the year. In 1924 the house was sold to its last private owner, Henry Edward Donner, a solicitor and a member of one of Scarborough's oldest families, who renamed it ‘Crescent House’. A keen gardener, Donner made many improvements to the gardens including installing the stone gateway to the old Falsgrave Strawberry Gardens, which can still be seen today.

Following Henry Donner's death, the house was purchased by Scarborough Corporation in 1942 for £3000 and for five years was used as a welfare clinic and children's nursery. The clinic moved out in February 1947 and the Corporation decided to turn the building into a public art gallery. The Scarborough Art Gallery opened to the public on 17 November 1947.

== See also ==
- Grade II* listed buildings in North Yorkshire (district)
- Listed buildings in Scarborough (Castle Ward)
