= Richard Halliwell =

Richard Halliwell may refer to:

- Richard Halliwell (cricketer)
- Richard Halliwell (veterinarian)
- Richard Halliwell (game designer)
