= Ralph Hutchinson (academic) =

English clergyman and academic

Ralph Hutchinson (or Huchenson) (1553?–1606) was an English clergyman and academic, President of St John's College, Oxford and a translator of the Authorised King James Version.

== Life ==
He was a younger son of John Hutchinson of London. He was educated at Merchant Taylors' School and St John's College, Oxford, where he was appointed to a fellowship by Joanna, widow of the founder, Sir Thomas White, in 1570. He graduated B.A. in 1575, and proceeded M.A. in 1578. He took holy orders, and was vicar of Cropthorne, Worcestershire, and Charlbury, Oxfordshire.

He was elected President of his college on 9 June 1590, graduated B.D. 6 November 1596, and D.D. in 1602. He was appointed one of the translators in the Second Westminster Company by King James, tasked with the Epistles of the New Testament in June 1604, and died on 16 January 1606. He was buried in the college chapel, where his widow, Mary, placed his effigy in stone.

== Family ==
He married Mary, daughter of his predecessor as President, Francis Willis; their daughter Anne married Rowland Searchfield. He had a son, Robert Gentilis, named for Alberico Gentili. It is thought that Anne Whitehead, an early Quaker and writer, was his granddaughter.

== Notes ==
Academic offices
Preceded by Francis Willis	President of St John's College, Oxford; 1590–1606	Succeeded by John Buckeridge
