= Mary Hearne =

18th century English novelist

Mary Hearne (? fl. 1718) is the name of a novelist whose works were published by Edmund Curll.

== Biography ==
It is possible, even likely, that the name does not accurately represent the author, as Curll frequently acquired hack writers to submit works and gave them assumed names. Therefore, it is possible that the novels written by Mary Hearne were not written by a woman or at least not by a woman named Mary Hearne. The Oxford Dictionary of National Biography treats "Mary Hearne" as a proper biographical subject, but with no documentary evidence of birth, death, or marriage records.

Two novels appeared under the name of Mary Hearne. The first, The Lover's Week, appeared in 1718, dedicated to Delariviere Manley; the second, The Female Deserters, appeared in 1719. Edmund Curll published the two together as Honour, the Victory; and Love, the Prize in 1720, but they were the same novels under new titles and format. He had them serialised in Heathcote's Original London Post in 1724, but, again, without any change. The first novel features a middle-class woman seeking pleasure and wealth, and in seven days she courts and obtains a sexual and romantic liaison and source of money without marriage. The second novel has two women in degradation. One is drugged and raped (in a precursor to the scene in Samuel Richardson's Clarissa), and the other has her suitor drugged and raped and is forced to work as servant to the first. The novels are highly sensational and competently written, but neither was a significant advance in the development of the English novel.
