= Francis Halliwell =

Anglican archdeacon

Francis Derrick Procter Halliwell was Archdeacon of Bombay from 1963 until 1965.

Halliwell was educated at Durham University and St Augustine's College, Canterbury; and ordained in 1937. After a curacy in New Eltham he was Chaplain at Hubli then Colaba before his time as Archdeacon and Vicar of Lee on the Solent afterwards.
