= Catherine Exley =

Catherine Exley (1779–1857) was an English diarist. She was the wife of a soldier who accompanied her husband when he served in Portugal, Spain, and Ireland during the Napoleonic Wars. Exley is best known as the author of a diary that gives an account of military life in that era from the viewpoint of the wife of a common soldier.

== Background ==
Catherine Whitaker was born at Leeds in 1779 and married Joshua Exley there in 1806. Between 1805 and 1815, Joshua served in the Second Battalion of the 34th Regiment of Foot, initially as a private and then for a little over two years, as a corporal. Exley accompanied her husband for a substantial portion of this time and in due course wrote an account that is probably unique in that it records and reflects on life in the British Army from the perspective of the wife of a soldier who did not reach the rank of an officer.

== The diary ==
Catherine's diary was first published as a booklet issued shortly after her death. A single copy of the booklet is known to exist, it was also reprinted in The Dewsbury Reporter during August 1923. The text of the diary is included in full in a more recently issued book, edited by Professor Rebecca Probert, along with essays on its military and religious context, the treatment of prisoners of war and the role of women in the British, French and Spanish armed forces during the Peninsular War.

The diary unfolds the hardships that both Catherine and her husband suffered during his military service, including one period when they both wrongly thought that the other had died. There are detailed accounts of the births and deaths of children, the cold, hunger and filthy conditions of military life and the horror of the aftermaths of battles. Details of the author's religious experiences which led her to membership of the Methodist church also appear. Exley wrote the diary during the last 20 years before her death, which took place in 1857 at Batley, Yorkshire.
