= Mary Forster (Quaker) =

Mary Forster (c. 1620–1687) was an English Quaker campaigner. She wrote a preface to the 1671 edition of Guide to the Blind, which had been written by her husband, Thomas Forster (died 1660).

== A female approach ==
Mary Forster also composed an address, "To the Reader", which accompanied a petition to the Parliament of England presented on 20 May 1659, expressing opposition by over 7000 women to "the oppression of Tithes" levied by the established church.

To justify a then unusual political intervention by a woman in the form of a parliamentary petition, Forster states that it was God's way to employ "weak means to bring to pass his mighty work." She gives testimony in Piety Promoted (1686) on behalf of Anne Whitehead, who is thought to have been the first woman preacher among the Quakers in 1655. As one of five signatories to A Living Testimony from... Our Faithful Women's Meeting (1685) she argues, "We are not to put our Candles under a Bushel, nor to hide our Talents in a Napkin," having gained wisdom of God about "what will do in Families" as "Mothers of Children, and Antient Women in Our Families".

However, Mary Forster still sees the Protofeminist protests of women as secondary reinforcement to the work of men. She justifies their tithes protest as auxiliary, but notes it is compatible with the actions of the Quaker "Brethren".

== Persecution ==
Her main issue in Some Seasonable Considerations (1684) is the continuing persecution of the Quakers.

== Private life ==
Very little else is known of her private life. Mary Forster died in 1687.
