= William Hey (surgeon) =

English surgeon (1736–1819)

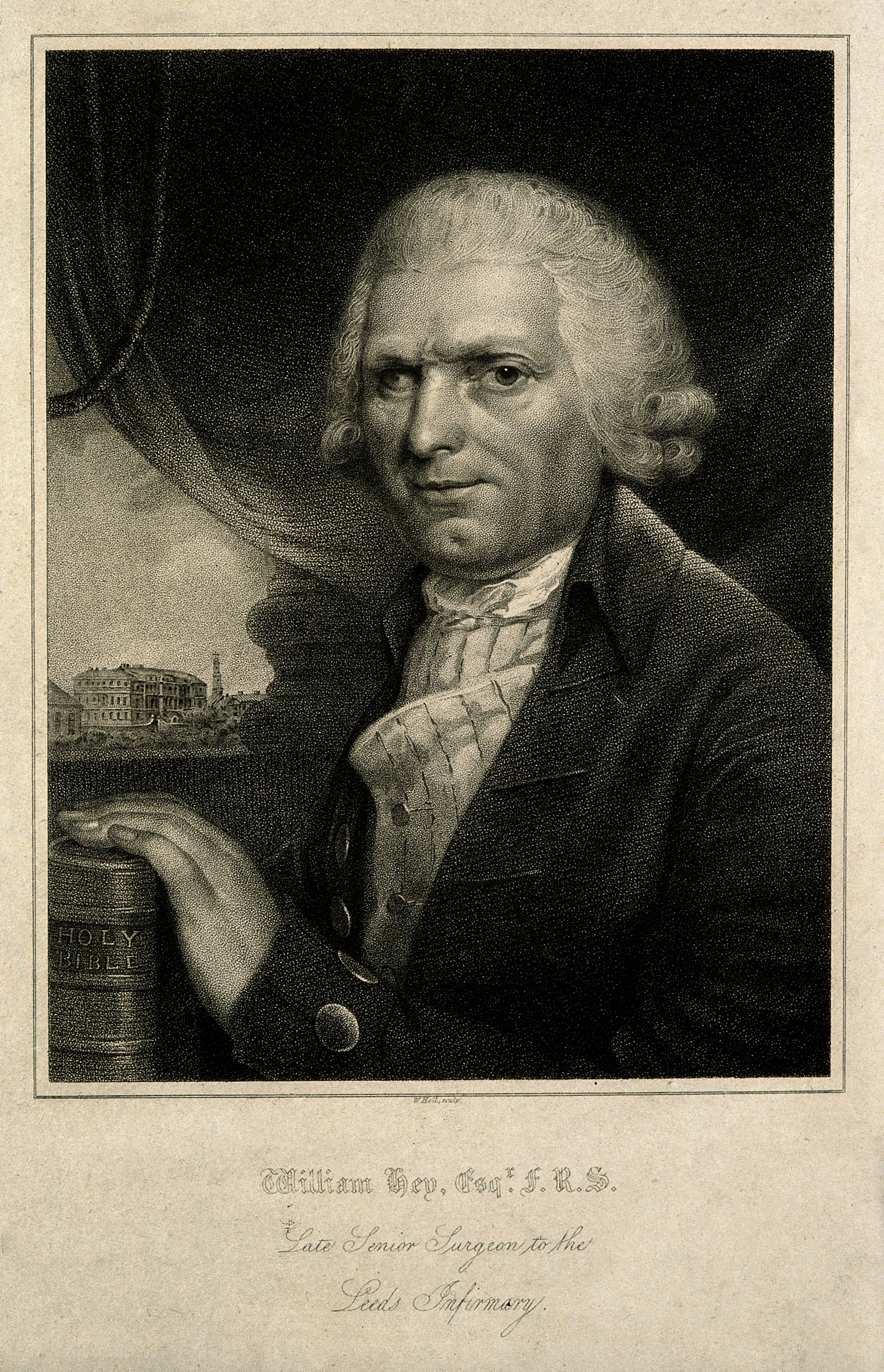
- William Hey, 1816 stipple engraving
- Born: 23 August 1736; Pudsey, Leeds, England
- Died: 23 March 1819 (aged 82)
- Occupations: Surgeon and politician

William Hey (23 August 1736 – 23 March 1819) was an English surgeon, born in Pudsey, West Riding of Yorkshire, the son of Richard Hey and his wife Mary Simpson; John Hey and Richard Hey were his brothers. He was a surgeon at Leeds General Infirmary from its opening in a temporary building in 1767, and senior surgeon from 1773 to 1812.

He gave his name to Hey's amputation (a tarso-metatarsal amputation), Hey's internal derangement (dislocation of the semilunar cartilages of the knee joint), Hey's ligament (the semilunar lateral margin (falciform margin) of the fossa ovalis), and Hey's saw, used in skull surgery.

Hey served as mayor of Leeds in 1787–88 and 1802–03. In 1783 he was President of the Leeds Philosophical and Literary Society. He also founded the Leeds Club. In March 1775, he was elected a Fellow of the Royal Society. He was one of the founding members of the Leeds Library, alongside his friend Joseph Priestley and other surgeons, clergymen, leading industrialists and businessmen.

== Family ==
Hey married Alice Banks (c.1737–1820) in 1761. Two of their sons William Hey (1772–1844) and Richard Hey became surgeons and worked with their father. William Hey III (1796–1875) was appointed Surgeon to the Leeds Infirmary in 1830, and took over the family practice in 1844. He married the poet Rebecca Hey in 1821.

== Publications ==
- 'Observations on the Blood, 1779
- Practical Observations in Surgery, 1803
- Tracts and Essays, Moral and Theological, including a Defence of the Doctrines of the Divinity of Christ, and of the Atonement, 1822
