= John Hey =

English cleric and academic

- Born: July 1734
- Died: 17 March 1815; St John's Wood

John Hey (1734–1815) was an English cleric, the first Norrisian Professor of Theology at Cambridge.

== Life ==
The son of Richard Hey of Pudsey and his wife Mary Simpson, and elder brother of William Hey and Richard Hey, he was born in July 1734. After Sedbergh School, he entered Catharine Hall, Cambridge in 1751, graduating B.A. in 1755 and M.A. in 1758. He became a fellow of Sidney Sussex College in 1758, and was tutor from 1760 to 1779. He took his B.D. degree in 1765, and his D.D. in 1780. His lectures on morality were admired, and were attended by William Pitt the younger.

In 1779 Charles Maynard, 1st Viscount Maynard presented Hey to the rectory of Passenham, in southern Northamptonshire, and he later obtained the adjacent rectory of Calverton, Buckinghamshire. He was elected in 1780 to the Norrisian professorship of divinity, of which he was the first holder. He was re-elected in 1785 and in 1790. According to the regulations then in force, he might have been elected for another term if he had resigned in 1794, before reaching the age of 60, but declined to do so. He held his livings until 1814, when he resigned them and moved to London.

Hey died on 17 March 1815, and was buried in St John's Chapel, St John's Wood.

== Works ==
Hey's Norrisian lectures in divinity represented the difference between the Church of England and unitarians as little more than verbal, but defended subscription to the Thirty-nine Articles. His treatment of the issues appealed later to the Tractarians. The lectures were published in 1796 in 4 vols. A second edition appeared in 1822, and a third, edited by Thomas Turton, appeared in 1841. He published also in 1801 a Set of Discourses on the Malevolent Passions (reprinted 1815); and printed, but did not publish, in 1811, General Observations on the Writings of St. Paul.

Winning the Seatonian prize for a poem in 1763, Hey published it as The Redemption: a Poetical Essay. He also published sermons.

== Notes ==
Attribution

This article incorporates text from a publication now in the public domain: Stephen, Leslie; Lee, Sidney, eds. (1891). "Hey, John". Dictionary of National Biography. Vol. 26. London: Smith, Elder & Co.
