= Richard Hey =

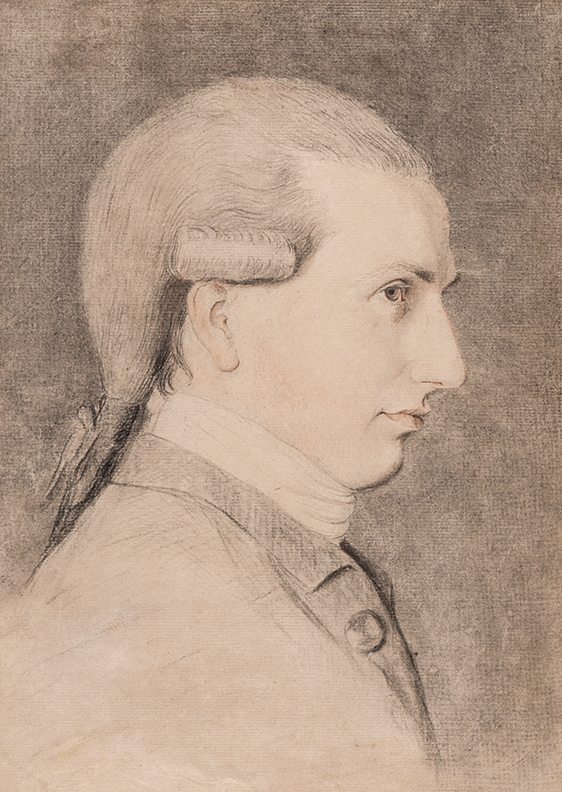
Portrait by Thomas Kerrich, dated April 1776

Richard Hey (1745–1835) was an English academic, essayist and writer against gambling.

== Life ==
He was born at Pudsey, near Leeds, on 22 August 1745, the younger brother of John Hey and William Hey. He became a fellow of Magdalene College, Cambridge, graduating Bachelor of Arts (BA) in 1768. In 1771 he took the degree of Cambridge Master of Arts (MA Cantab) as fellow of Sidney Sussex College, and in 1779 Legum Doctor (LLD) per lit. reg. In 1771 he was called to the bar at the Middle Temple. He was admitted to Doctors' Commons, but obtaining no practice retired from the bar.

Hey was fellow and tutor of Magdalene College from 1782 till 1796, and was also elected one of the esquire bedells. He died on 7 December 1835, at Hertingfordbury, near Hertford, at age 90.

== Works ==
In 1776 Hey published Observations on the Nature of Civil Liberty and the Principles of Government. His major work was the Dissertation on the Pernicious Effects of Gaming, awarded a prize of fifty guineas from the University of Cambridge. The first edition appeared at Cambridge in 1783, and the third in 1812. Hey in 1784 won a second prize, offered by the same anonymous donor, by his Dissertation on Duelling, which also reached a third edition in 1812. His Dissertation on Suicide gained him a third prize of 50 guineas. It was first printed in 1785, again in 1812, when the three dissertations were published together.

In 1792, Hey's Happiness and Rights appeared at York appeared in reply to the Rights of Man by Tom Paine. He also wrote a tragedy in five acts The Captive Monarch (1794) which was published in 1794 (with a scenario based on the fate of Louis XVI), and in 1796 Edington, a novel, in two volumes. His last work was Some Principles of Civilisation, with detached thoughts on the Promotion of Christianity in British India, Cambridge, 1815.

Hey contributed papers to Philosophical Transactions and other magazines. He assisted in editing a pamphlet on an Egyptian mummy, with anatomical and other details.

== Notes ==
Attribution

- This article incorporates text from a publication now in the public domain: Stephen, Leslie; Lee, Sidney, eds. (1891). "Hey, Richard". Dictionary of National Biography. Vol. 26. London: Smith, Elder & Co.
- "Hey, Richard (HY764R)". A Cambridge Alumni Database. University of Cambridge.
