= Catherine Jackson =

Lady Catherine Hannah Charlotte Elliott Jackson (1824–1891), published the diaries and letters of her husband Sir George Jackson (1785–1861) and was a prolific author in her own right, especially in the area of European history and of the court of France in the 16th century.

== Life ==
She was the daughter of Thomas Elliot of Wakefield. She married the Knight Diplomat Sir George Jackson (1785–1861) on St Helena in 1856 as his second wife. He was a distinguished diplomat, and is best known for accompanying Sir Charles Stuart to Germany and entering Paris with him in 1815, and for his efforts in connection with the abolition of the slave trade.

A decade after her husband's death, she edited the diaries and letters of her husband's early career for publication in London by Richard Bentley and Son. On 19 June 1874 she was granted a pension in recognition of her husband's services.

She then studied a variety of French memoirs, and compiled from them several books on French society. A few of the better known including "Old Paris: its Court and Literary Salons", appeared in two volumes in 1878, and "The Court of France in the Sixteenth Century", also in two volumes. Correspondence with her London publishers survives.

Lady Jackson also wrote about art, especially Western painting, in her histories of the French royal court. In her book "The Court of France in the Sixteenth Century", she observed:

"At about this time [speaking of the painter Raphael] only, movable pictures, to be hung on walls as ornaments, began to be in frequent demand. It is considered doubtful whether before the sixteenth century any such existed. For what would now be termed the easel pictures of the older masters have been detached from some articles of civil or ecclesiastical furniture."

As a widow Jackson lived at Upper Norwood, Surrey. She died at Bath on 9 December 1891.

== Bibliography ==
- The Diaries and Letters of Sir George Jackson (2 vols, 1872)
- The Bath Archives (2 vols, 1873)
- Fair Lusitania (1874), Portuguese translation (A Formosa Lusitânia) published by Livraria Portuense (1877)
- Old Paris: Its Court and Literary Salons (2 vols, 1878)
- The Old Régime: Court, salons, and theatres (1880)
- The French Court and Society. Reign of Louis XVI, and First Empire (1881)
- The Court of the Tuileries from the Restoration to the Flight of Louis Philippe (1883)
- The Court of France in the Sixteenth Century: 1514–1559 (1886)
- The Last of the Valois, and Accession of Henry of Navarre: 1559–1589 (1886)
- The First of the Bourbons: 1595–1610 (London, Richard Bentley and Son, 2 vols, 1890)
