= Edward Halliwell =

Edward Halliwell was admitted to King's College, Cambridge in 1532, graduating in 1535–6. He was a fellow of King's from 1535 to 1548. He was the author of a lost tragedy, Dido, which was performed before Queen Elizabeth I during her royal visit to the university on 7 August 1564.
