= 1696 in literature =

This article contains information about the literary events and publications of 1696.

== Events ==
- January – Colley Cibber's play Love's Last Shift is first performed at the Theatre Royal, Drury Lane in London.
- March 5 – William Penn marries his second wife, Hannah Callowhill.
- September – The Theatre Royal, Drury Lane, London, stages The Female Wits, an anti-feminist satire targeting Mary Pix, Delarivier Manley and Catherine Trotter, the three significant women dramatists of the era. The play is a hit, and runs for three nights straight (unusual in the repertory system of the day).
- November 21 – John Vanbrugh's first play, the comedy The Relapse, or Virtue in Danger, a sequel to Love's Last Shift, is first performed at the Theatre Royal, Drury Lane, with Cibber in the cast.
- unknown date
  - The Tuscan poet Vincenzo da Filicaja becomes governor of Volterra.
  - Chapbook peddlers in England are required to hold a licence.

== New books ==
=== Fiction ===
- John Aubrey – Miscellanies
- Philip Ayres – The Revengeful Mistress
- Aphra Behn (died 1689) – The Histories and Novels of the Late Ingenious Mrs. Behn
- Charles Leslie – The Snake in the Grass
- Mary Pix – The Inhumane Cardinal; or, Innocence Betray'd (novel)
- John Suckling – The Works of Sir John Suckling
- John Tillotson – The Works of John Tillotson

=== Drama ===
- John Banks – Cyrus the Great, or The Tragedy of Love
- Aphra Behn – The Younger Brother
- Colley Cibber – Love's Last Shift
- Thomas Dilke – The City Lady
- Thomas Doggett – The Country Wake
- Thomas D'Urfey – The Comical History of Don Quixote. The Third Part
- George Granville, 1st Baron Lansdowne – The She-Gallants
- Joseph Harris – The City Bride; or, The Merry Cuckold (adapted from A Cure for a Cuckold)
- Charles Hopkins – Neglected Virtue
- Delarivier Manley
  - The Lost Lover, or The Jealous Husband
  - The Royal Mischief
- Peter Anthony Motteux
  - Love's a Jest
  - She Ventures and He Wins
- Mary Pix
  - The Spanish Wives
  - Ibrahim, the Thirteenth Emperour of the Turks
- Edward Ravenscroft – The Anatomist, or the Sham Doctor
- Thomas Southerne – Oroonoko, or The Royal Slave: a tragedy (adapted from Aphra Behn's novel Oroonoko - published)
- John Vanbrugh – The Relapse

=== Poetry ===
- Nicholas Brady and Nahum Tate – New Version of the Psalms of David
- John Dryden – An Ode on the Death of Mr Henry Purcell (died 1695)
- John Oldmixon – Poems on Several Occasions
- Elizabeth Singer Rowe – Poems on Several Occasions
- Nahum Tate – Miscellanea Sacra; or, Poems on Divine & Moral Subjects

=== Non-fiction ===
- Richard Baxter – Reliquiae Baxterianae (posthumous)
- John Bellers – Proposals for Raising a College of Industry of All Useful Trades and Husbandry
- Gerard Croese – The General History of the Quakers (translation)
- Judith Drake (attributed) – An Essay in Defence of the Female Sex (anonymous)
- Gottfried Wilhelm Leibniz – Analyse des infiniment petits pour l'intelligence des lignes courbes
- Delarivier Manley – Letters Written by Mrs. Manley
- William Penn – Primitive Christianity Revived in the Faith and Practice of the People called Quakers
- John Sheffield, 1st Duke of Buckingham and Normanby – The Character of Charles II, King of England
- John Toland – Christianity not Mysterious
- William Whiston – A New Theory of the Earth

== Births ==
- July 14 – William Oldys, English antiquary, bibliographer and poet (died 1761)
- September 25 – Madame du Deffand, French literary hostess (died 1780)
- October 13 – John Hervey, 2nd Baron Hervey, English memoirist and courtier (died 1743)
- Unknown date – Matthew Green, English writer of light verse and customs official (died 1737)

== Deaths ==
- January 3 – Mary Mollineux, English Quaker poet (born c.1651)
- March 14 – Jean Domat, French jurist (born 1625)
- March 18 – Bonaventura Baron, Irish theologian, philosopher and writer in Latin (born 1610)
- April 17 – Marie de Rabutin-Chantal, French author (born 1626)
- April 27 – Simon Foucher, French polemic philosopher (born 1644)
- May 10 – Jean de La Bruyère, French essayist (born 1645)
- June 9 – Antoine Varillas, French historian (born 1626)
- August 9 – Wacław Potocki, Polish nobleman (Szlachta), moralist, Baroque poet and writer (born 1621)
- September 8 – Henry Birkhead, English academic, lawyer, Latin poet and founder of the Oxford Chair of Poetry (born 1617)
- November 26 – Gregório de Matos, Brazilian Baroque poet (born 1636)
- December 31 – Samuel Annesley, English Puritan minister noted for his sermons (born c.1620)
- Unknown dates
  - Jón Magnússon, Icelandic writer (born c. 1610)
  - Gesshū Sōko (月舟宗胡), Japanese Zen Buddhist teacher, poet and calligrapher (born 1618)
