= 1737 in literature =

This article contains information about the literary events and publications of 1737.

== Events ==
- March 2 – Samuel Johnson and his former pupil David Garrick leave Lichfield to seek their fortunes in London.
- June 21 – The Theatrical Licensing Act is passed, introducing censorship to the London stage. Plays now require approval before production. Edward Capell is appointed deputy-inspector of plays. "Legitimate drama" is limited to the theaters at Drury Lane, Covent Garden, and the Haymarket. The anonymous satire The Golden Rump (which may never have existed in full) is used as ammunition by the Act's proponents.
- September 1 – The News Letter is first published in Belfast by Francis Joy, making it the world's oldest existing English newspaper.
- October – The first professional stage production in the Swedish language by native-born actors is given in Sweden, of the comedy Den Svenska Sprätthöken at the Bollhuset in Stockholm.
- November 20 – Caroline of Ansbach, Queen Consort of Great Britain and a significant patron of the arts, dies.
- unknown date – The poet Richard Jago becomes curate of Snitterfield.

== New books ==
=== Prose ===
- Guillaume-Hyacinthe Bougeant – Amusement philosophique sur le language des bêtes (Philosophical Amusements on the Language of the Animals)
- Alexander Cruden – A Complete Concordance to the Holy Scriptures of the Old and New Testament
- Philip Doddridge – Submission to Divine Providence in the Death of Children
- Stephen Duck – The Vision
- Jonathan Edwards – A Faithful Narrative of the Surprising Works of God
- Étienne Fourmont – Meditationes Sinicae
- William Law – A Demonstration of the Gross and Fundamental Errors of a Late Book (an answer to Benjamin Hoadly from 1735)
- Marguerite de Lubert – Tecserion
- William Oldys – The British Librarian
- Elizabeth Singer Rowe – Devout Exercises of the Heart
- Sarah Stone – A Complete Practice of Midwifery
- Jan Swammerdam – Biblia Naturae
- Jonathan Swift – A Proposal for Giving Badges to the Beggars in all the Parishes of Dublin
- Diego de Torres Villarroel – Médico para el bolsillo

=== Drama ===
- Henry Carey – The Dragon of Wantley (burlesque opera adaptation)
- Robert Dodsley – The King and the Miller of Mansfield
- Henry Fielding
  - The Historical Register for the Year 1736
  - Eurydice Hiss'd, or a Word to the Wise
- Robert Gould (died 1709) – Innocence Distress'd (published; written c. 1689 but never performed)
- William Havard – King Charles I
- John Hewitt – A Tutor for the Beaus
- Samuel Johnson – All Alive and Merry
- George Lillo – Fatal Curiosity
- Francis Lynch – The Independent Patriot
- Pierre de Marivaux – Les Fausses Confidences
- James Miller – The Universal Passion (adapted from Much Ado About Nothing)

=== Poetry ===
- Richard Glover – Leonidas
- Matthew Green – The Spleen
- Ignacio de Luzán – Poética
- Alexander Pope
  - Horace His Ode to Venus
  - The Second Epistle of the Second Book of Horace, Imitated
  - The First Epistle of the Second Book of Horace, Imitated
  - The Works of Alexander Pope vols. v-vi
- William Shenstone – Poems
- Prince Thammathibet – The Legend of Phra Malai (พระมาลัยคำหลวง, Phra Malai)
- Voltaire – Défense du Mondain ou l'apologie du luxe ("Defense of the Worldling or an Apology for Luxury"), a poetic response to criticism of his Le Mondain
- John Wesley – A Collection of Psalms and Hymns

== Births ==
- January 19 – Jacques-Henri Bernardin de Saint-Pierre, French novelist and travel writer (died 1814)
- January 29 – Thomas Paine, English free thinker and revolutionary (died 1809)
- February 22 – Anne Ford, English writer, singer and musician (died 1824)
- April 18 – William Hazlitt Sr., Irish religious writer, radical and Unitarian minister (died 1820)
- April 27 – Edward Gibbon, English historian (died 1794)
- May 11 (baptised) – Richard Chandler, English antiquary (died 1810)
- unknown dates
  - Frances Abington, née Barton, English actress (died 1815)
  - Nicolas Fernández de Moratín, Spanish literary reformer (died 1780)

== Deaths ==
- February 21 – Elizabeth Rowe, English dramatist and poet (born 1674)
- May – Jean Alphonse Turretin, Swiss theologian (born 1671)
- May 4 – Eustace Budgell, English satirist (suicide, born 1686)
- May 17 – Claude Buffier, philosopher and historian (born 1661)
- June 21 – Matthieu Marais, French memoirist (born 1664)
- August 28 – John Hutchinson, theologian (born 1674)
- September 18 – Jane Fearon, English Quaker pamphleteer (born 1654 or 1656)
- October 18 – Abel Evans, English poet (born 1679)
- unknown dates – Matthew Green, English poet (born 1696)
