= Robert Aris Willmott =

English cleric and author

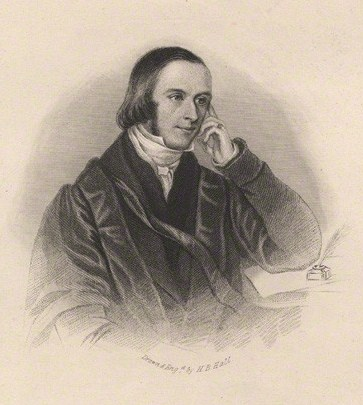
- Robert Aris Willmott, 1858 engraving by Henry Bryan Hall
- Born: 30 January 1809; Bradfield, Berkshire, England
- Died: 27 May 1863 (aged 54); Nettlebed, Oxfordshire, England
- Education: Trinity College, Cambridge
- Occupations: Clergyman, author, poet, literary critic
- Writing career
- Period: Victorian era
- Genres: Biography, religious literature, poetry, essays
- Notable works: Pleasures, Objects, and Advantages of Literature (1851); Bishop Jeremy Taylor: A Biography (1847)

Robert Aris Willmott (30 January 1809 – 27 May 1863) was an English cleric and author. Christened Robert Eldridge Aris Willmott, he never used his second Christian name.

== Life ==
Willmott -- the son of a solicitor, who married, about 1803, to Mary Ann (died 1861), daughter of Rev John Cleeve of Ringwood, Hampshire -- was born at Bradford, Wiltshire on 30 January 1809. His father went to London, and had money troubles. In October 1819, he was admitted at Merchant Taylors' school. He entered Harrow School in January or February 1825. There in March 1828 he brought out the first number of the Harrovian, which ran to six numbers.

At the close of 1828 Willmott became tutor to Thomas Green, and remained so for about two years. He entered Trinity College, Cambridge, in 1832, but his matriculation was deferred until 17 February 1834. While at Cambridge he earned his living by his pen. He graduated B.A. on 26 May 1841.

Willmott in 1842 was ordained deacon by Charles James Blomfield, Bishop of London, to the curacy of St. James, Ratcliff; and he was ordained priest on 11 June 1843. After serious illness he took leave of St. James's on 2 June 1844, his farewell sermon being printed. For three months he was stationed at Chelsea Hospital, and in June 1845 became curate to the Rev. Thomas William Allies at Launton, Oxfordshire. The church of St. Catherine, Bearwood, which had been erected with the support of John Walter, was consecrated on 23 April 1846, and Willmott was appointed by him as its first incumbent. Initially he was on good terms with the patron, but about 1861 differences arose with the patron, and Willmott resigned the benefice in May 1862 on a pension.

Willmott moved to Nettlebed in Oxfordshire, and began writing for the Churchman's Family Magazine.’ He was engaged in the preparation of three new books when he was incapacitated by an attack of paralysis. He died at Nettlebed on 27 May 1863, aged 54. He was buried, with his mother and sister (Mary Cleeve Willmott, who died at Richmond on 9 May 1854, aged 47), in the churchyard of Bearwood. An engraved frontispiece of Willmott, by H. B. Hall, is in Henry Christmas, Preachers and Preaching (1858).

== Works ==
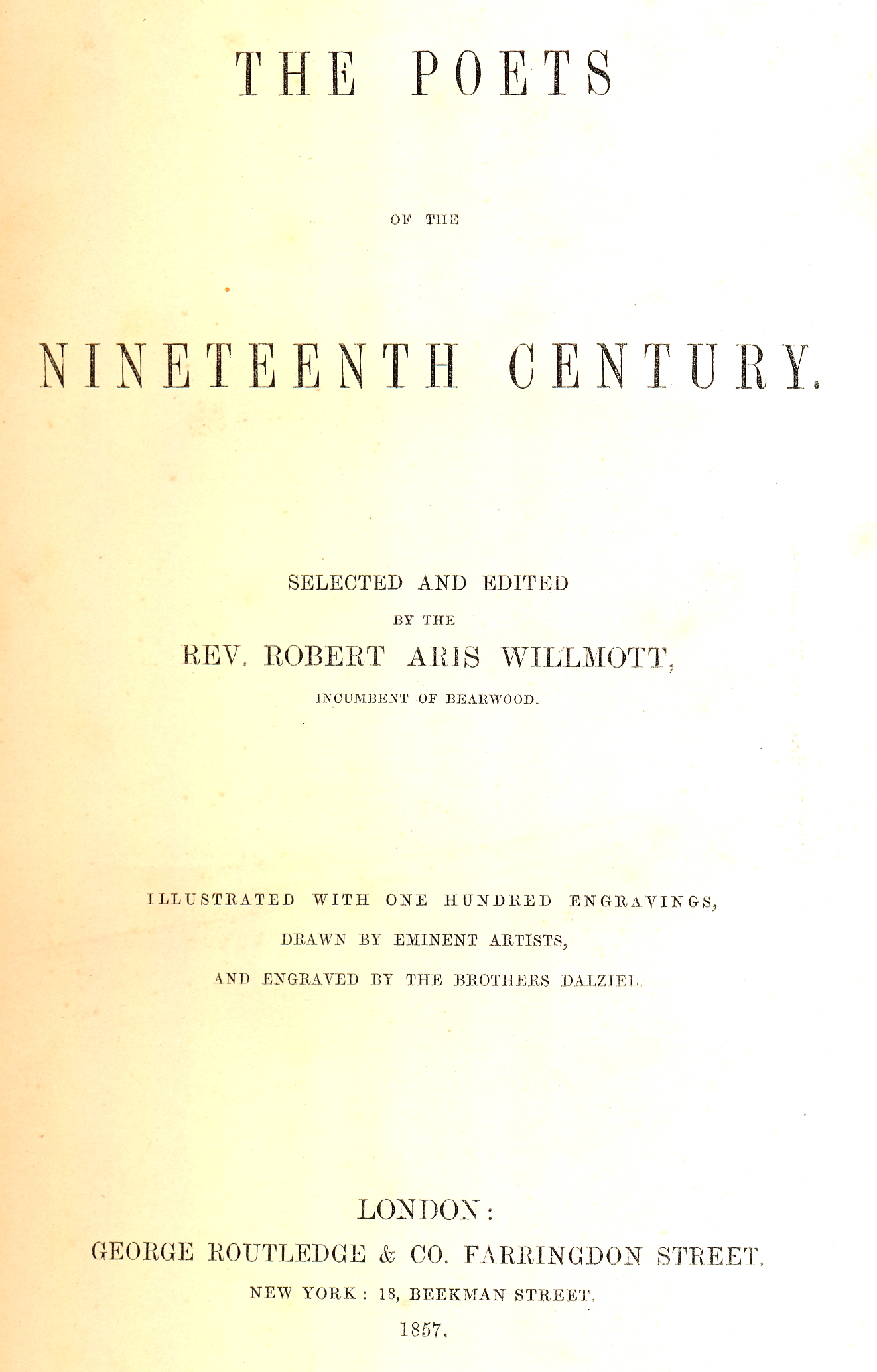
The Poets of the Nineteenth Century, 1857

Already in 1829–30 Willmott was contributing to the Church of England Quarterly Review, Fraser's Magazine, the London Magazine, and the Asiatic Journal. His best known works were:

- A Journal of Summer-time in the Country, 1849; illustrated ed. 1858; 4th ed., with memoir by his sister, 1864. ISBN 137358839X, 978-1373588395
- Pleasures, Objects, and Advantages of Literature, 1851; 5th ed. 1860; by 1858 five editions of it had appeared in German.ISBN 0543873366, 978-0543873361

His other works included:

- Lives of Sacred Poets, 1834; 2nd ser. 1838.ASIN B01NCFCX3I
- Conversations at Cambridge (anon.), 1836.ISBN 0371724635, 978-0371724637
- Letters of Eminent Persons, selected and illustrated, 1839.ISBN 1290492638, 978-1290492638
- Parlour Table Book: Extracts from various Authors, 1840, dedicated to his old friend James Montgomery.
- Pictures of Christian Life, 1841.
- Poems, 1841; 2nd ed., much altered and enlarged, 1848.
- Life of Jeremy Taylor, 1847; 2nd ed. 1848.
- Precious Stones from Prose Writers of the Sixteenth, Seventeenth, and Eighteenth Centuries, 1850.
- The Poets of the Nineteenth Century, 1857; the original edition was illustrated by engravings by the brothers Dalziel (George Dalziel, Edward Dalziel, Thomas Bolton Gilchrist Septimus Dalziel), after Birekt Foster, John Gilbert, John Tenniel, John Everett Millais, and other artists.
- English Sacred Poetry, 1862; 2nd ed. 1883.

Willmott edited for George Routledge's British Poets the poems of Thomas Gray, Thomas Parnell, William Collins, Matthew Green, and Thomas Warton (1854 and 1883); the works of George Herbert in prose and verse (1854; Herbert's poems, with Willmott's memoir and notes, were then published at Boston, U.S.A., in 1855); the poems of Mark Akenside and John Dyer (1855), William Cowper (1855), Robert Burns (1856; reissued in 1866), Percy's Reliques (1857), and Edward Fairfax's translation of Tasso's Jerusalem Delivered (1858). He edited selections from the poetry of William Wordsworth (1859) and James Montgomery (1859), and the poems of Oliver Goldsmith (1860). His Dream of the Poets at Cambridge, from Spenser to Gray, was in John James Smith's Cambridge Portfolio (i. 47–53), and he contributed notes to Samuel Pegge's ‘Anecdotes of the English Language’ (1844 ed.)

Willmott was also known as a preacher. His publications included funeral sermons for John Walter (d. 1847) and for Mrs. Emily Frances Walter (d. 1858).

== Notes ==
Attribution

This article incorporates text from a publication now in the public domain: Lee, Sidney, ed. (1900). "Willmott, Robert Aris". Dictionary of National Biography. Vol. 62. London: Smith, Elder & Co.
