= The Golden Rump =

The Golden Rump is a farcical play of unknown authorship said to have been written in 1737. It acted as the chief trigger for the Theatrical Licensing Act 1737. The play has never been performed on stage or published in print. No manuscript of the play survives, casting some doubt over whether it ever existed in full at all. The authorship of the play has often been ascribed to Henry Fielding, at that time a popular and prolific playwright who often turned his incisive satire against the monarch, George II, and particularly the "prime minister", Sir Robert Walpole. Modern literary historians, however, increasingly embrace the opinion that The Golden Rump may have been secretly commissioned by Walpole himself in a successful bid to get his bill for theatrical licensing passed before the legislature.

== Background ==
Plays, prints, pamphlets and journal articles attacking the king, Walpole and the extended Whig faction were not an uncommon feature of early 18th-century London. Plays were subjected to the greatest displeasure from royal authority, and individual works, like John Gay's Polly (1729) and Fielding's own Grub-Street Opera (1731), had earlier been prevented from reaching the stage. However, the trend itself survived through the 1720s and 1730s, and a number of these satirical works used the devices of physical, sexual and scatological humour to mock the persons of Walpole and George II. Both the king and the prime minister were men of short, corpulent build; George II being the unfortunate possessor of a disproportionately large posterior and an affliction of piles, to which he had acquired a fistula by early 1737. All these personal deficiencies were mercilessly lampooned by Opposition satirists of the period.

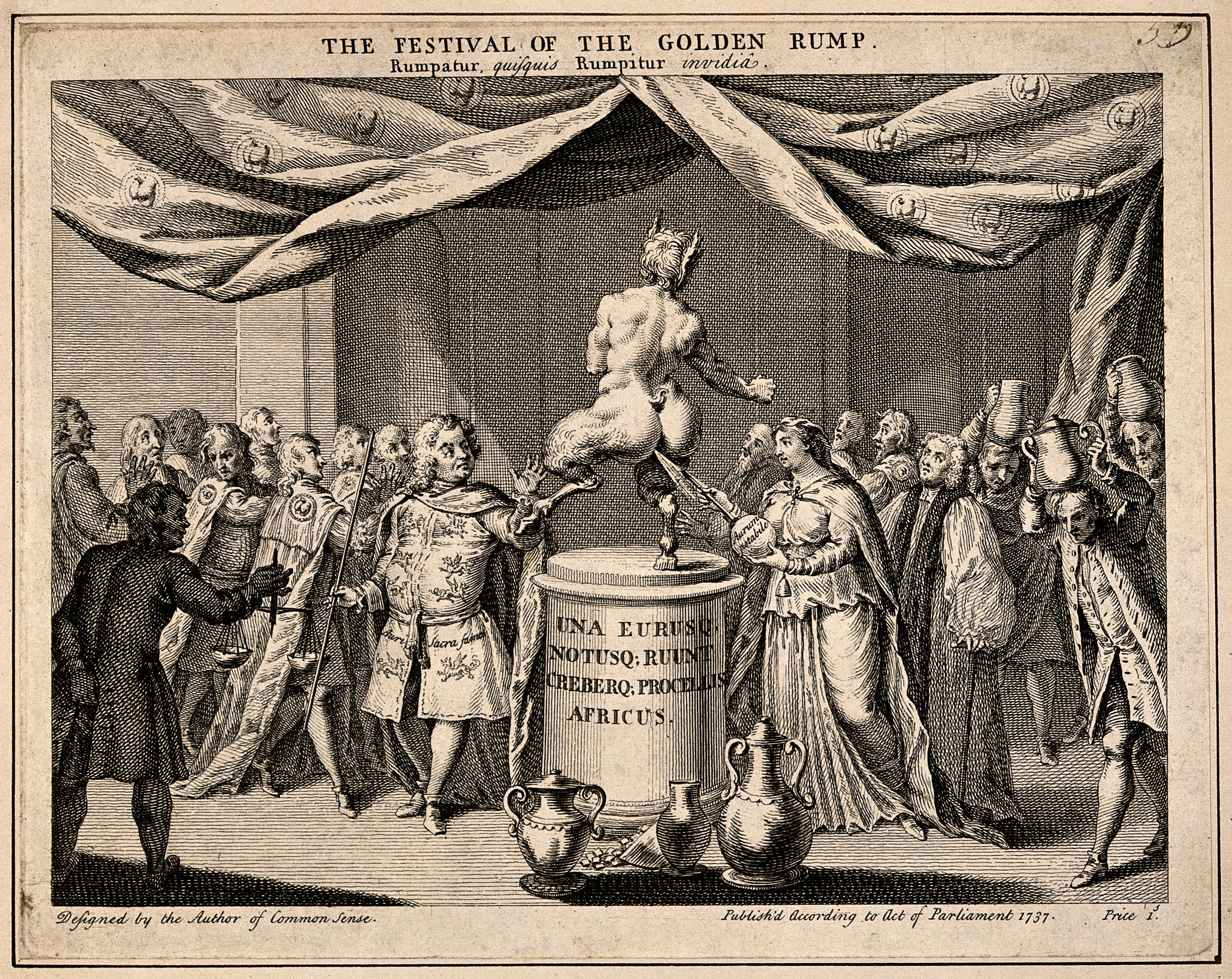
"The Festival of the Golden Rump". George II is presented as the satyric figure in the centre. On his left and right are Robert Walpole and Queen Caroline, respectively. On the far left is Horatio Walpole, the PM's brother and the "Balance-Master of Europe". The attending peers adorned with golden rumps, as are the overhanging curtains.

The controversy of The Golden Rump dates back to an anonymous allegory published in two parts in the Opposition journal Common Sense on 19 and 26 March 1737. Titled A Vision of the Golden Rump, this work has later been attributed to Dr. William King of Oxford, a staunch Jacobite propagandist. In this satire, the "visionary" in his dream lands up in a pleasant meadow not unlike Greenwich Park, where he encounters "the Noblesse of the Kingdom" on their way to celebrate the Festival of the Golden Rump. The Pagod of the Golden Rump is easily identifiable as George II; the Chief Magician (whose "belly" is "as prominent as the Pagod's Rump") is without doubt Robert Walpole; while the figure of Queen Caroline is presented as injecting a solution of aurum potabile from time to time from a contrivance that is "a Golden Tube ... with a large Bladder at the End, resembling a common Clyster-Pipe" into the Pagod's Rump, "to comfort his Bowels, and to appease the Idol, when he lifted up his cloven Foot to correct his Domesticks".

An extract of this raucous piece is published in The Gentleman's Magazine during the same month; and its picturesque description is soon turned into a satiric print called "The Festival of the Golden Rump" and published in The Craftsman on 7 May. The subtitle of the print reads "Rumpatur, quisquis Rumpitur invidia", dog Latin for what The Common Sense translated as "Whoever envies me, let him be RUMPED". The reference clearly draws attention to the self-titled Rumpsteak Club that gathered at that time around the figure of Frederick Louis, the disenchanted son of George II and heir apparent to the English crown.

The earliest published reference to the existence of a play called The Golden Rump appears in an anonymous essay in the 28 May 1737 edition of The Craftsman, recently attributed to Henry Fielding. By the time of the publication of this essay, the bill for licensing the stage had already passed through the House of Commons and was presented before the Lords. The play, reports the article, was submitted unsolicited to Henry Griffard, then the manager of the playhouse at Lincoln's Inn Fields, who put it into rehearsal with his company but also submitted the manuscript – obnoxious beyond any other play on contemporary stage – for the attentions of Robert Walpole. A later reminiscence by Thomas Davies informs that Griffard received a mere amount of one hundred pounds as a compensation for providing the prime minister with his most effective weapon for placing a censor over the stage. On reading the manuscript of The Golden Rump, Walpole immediately put a stop to any attempt of the public performance of the play. The manuscript was also used as his chief argument before the king and the House of Commons for demanding an amendment of the original Theatrical Licensing Act, the Vagrants Act 1713.

== Attribution to Henry Fielding ==
The anonymous authorship of The Golden Rump has often been attributed to Henry Fielding, who was certainly no stranger to writing political satires on sensitive subjects, having produced on stage and published his latest works The Historical Register for the Year 1736 and Eurydice Hiss’d around roughly the same time. A contributor to The Grub Street Journal writing under the pen name of Marforio accused Fielding, in 1740, of penning the offensive play; but perhaps the most famous attribution is that of Horace Walpole, who claimed to have seen the manuscript in Fielding's handwriting among his father's papers. No evidence of this manuscript, however, has been discovered.

From 1735/1736 to the closing of the theatres by the Licensing Act, Fielding had been the manager of the Little Theatre at Haymarket along with his friend James Ralph. It was at this location that his final plays would be staged, as well as political satires by others like Joseph Dormans and Henry Carey. Under the circumstances one would naturally be led to question why Fielding would take his latest dramatic work to Griffard in Lincoln's Inn Fields instead of staging it with his own company. However, Fielding's relationship with the politics and political figures of his time was far from a simple one. His attitude towards political factions can be surmised succinctly from a declaration made on 26 March 1748 edition of The Jacobite's Journal, where he wrote:

In a Time therefore of profound Tranquillity, and when the Consequence, at the worst, can probably be no greater than the Change of a Ministry, I do not think a Writer, whose only Livelihood is his Pen, to deserve a very flagitious Character, if, when one Set of Men deny him Encouragement, he seeks it from another, at their Expense; nor will I rashly condemn such a Writer as the vilest of Men, (provided he keeps within the Rules of Decency) if he endeavours to make the best of his own Cause, and uses a little Art in blackening his Adversary. Why should a Liberty which is allowed to every other Advocate, be deny’d to this?

Early in his career as a writer, Fielding had displayed obviously Whig sympathies. He came from a family with powerful connections at the Court; and time and again had Fielding attempted to obtain the patronage of Colley Cibber of the Theatre Royal and of Walpole himself, as evident from his dedication of The Modern Husband (1731/1732) and the several humorous verse epistles to Walpole soliciting government "sinecure". It has been suggested that Fielding had suppressed the performance as well as publication of The Grub-Street Opera during his lifetime under instruction (and possibly suitable compensation) from Walpole himself or someone acting on his behalf. By 1737, Fielding had definitely drifted further into the Opposition camp but until further decisive proof is unearthed, his claim to the authorship of The Golden Rump cannot be expressly disinclined.

== The role of Sir Robert Walpole ==
The suspicion that Sir Robert Walpole had commissioned The Golden Rump to specifically aid his cause for the censorship of the stage has existed from the very beginning of the controversy. It was first suggested by Henry Fielding in the same Craftsman essay that announced the existence of the play to the world. Fielding's conjecture is supported by, among others, his theatrical contemporaries Theophilus Cibber (in his autobiography) and Thomas Davies (in his Memoirs of the Life of David Garrick). Modern critic Peter Thomson has written in an essay:

There is, in fact, no convincing evidence that such a play was ever written. Using nothing more than the cartoon "The Festival of the Golden Rump", a resourceful hack could readily have composed enough scurrilous dialogue to provide Walpole with material for his Commons speech.

It is certainly a matter of speculation, especially if The Golden Rump had gone into rehearsal as Fielding's earliest article proclaims, that not even a hack copy of the play has survived. In the absence of text and other evidence, the true story of The Golden Rump remains a mystery to this day.

== In literature ==
- The novelette Slick Filth: A Story of Robert Walpole and Henry Giffard, to Which is Appended the Farce of the Golden Rump, ISBN 978-1734184624, by Erato contains a fictionalized account of the play's creation and a reimagined script.
