= The Journal of a Voyage to Lisbon =

Work by Henry Fielding

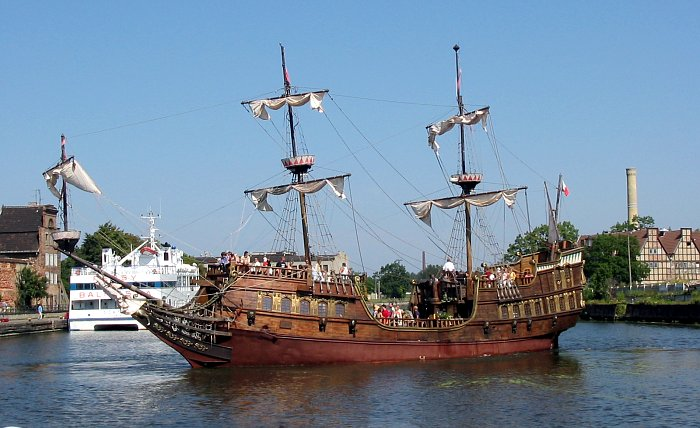
- Galleon of imagination, perhaps similar to the Queen of Portugal by Tomasz Sienicki (2004)
- Editor: Andrew Millar
- Author: Henry Fielding
- Translator: Nathalie Bernard (with a preface by Jean Viviès)
- Language: English
- Genre: Chronicle of a journey
- Published: 1755 (posthumous work)
- Publication place: England
- Pages: 186
- ISBN: 2853997359
- Preceded by: Amelia (novel) (1751), The Covent-Garden Journal (1752)

The Journal of a Voyage to Lisbon (Journal d'un voyage de Londres à Lisbonne) is the final work by Henry Fielding (1707–1754), written during a challenging period in his life. In the summer of 1754, accompanied by his wife and a few companions, Fielding set sail for Lisbon aboard the Queen of Portugal. The voyage was marked by delays and rough weather, causing the initial part of the journal to focus more on England’s shores than on the journey itself.

The book is structured as a chronicle, blending daily anecdotes with reflections on political and moral issues. Fielding’s characteristic humor permeates the narrative, tempered by a stoic acceptance of the difficulties he faces. He offers commentary on maritime law and reflects on his recent experiences as a magistrate, a role he had only recently left.

Irony is a key feature throughout the text, often directed at the narrator himself. Fielding draws inspiration from various English travelogues and classical works by Homer and Virgil, creating parallels between the passengers’ experiences and the epic journeys of antiquity.

The diary was published posthumously in January 1755.

== Circumstances ==
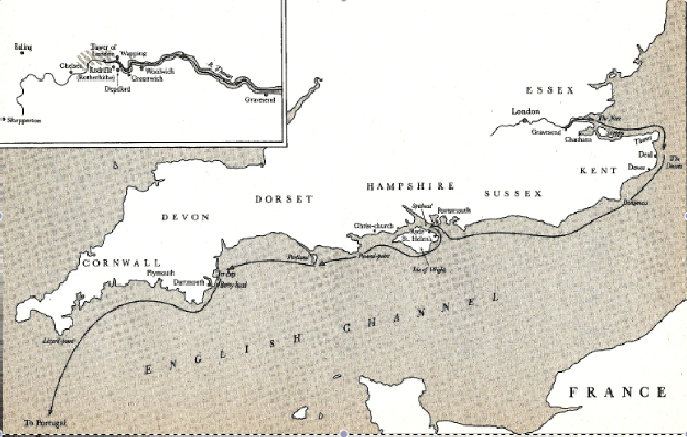
Henry Fielding's itinerary for his trip to Lisbon.

Portugal has been a popular destination for English travelers, many of whom documented their experiences. For example, Richard Twiss sailed from Falmouth to Lisbon in 1772; Joseph Baretti made the crossing in a week in 1760; and William Beckford took nine days in 1787. Fielding, however, took six weeks, making his Diary more a chronicle of his stops than of Lisbon itself. His account suggests that external forces are working against him, his wife, the ship, and its captain while offering fleeting moments of hope. The tone of Fielding's diary is predominantly solemn, though it includes occasional moments of humor, such as when sea spray unexpectedly forces him and the captain to the floor while attempting to eat.

I could not help reflecting how often the greatest abilities lie wind-bound as it were in life; or if they venture out, and attempt to beat the seas, they struggle in vain against wind and tide, and if they have not sufficient prudence to put back, are most probably cast away on the rocks and quicksands, which are every day ready to devour them.

=== Decision and boarding ===
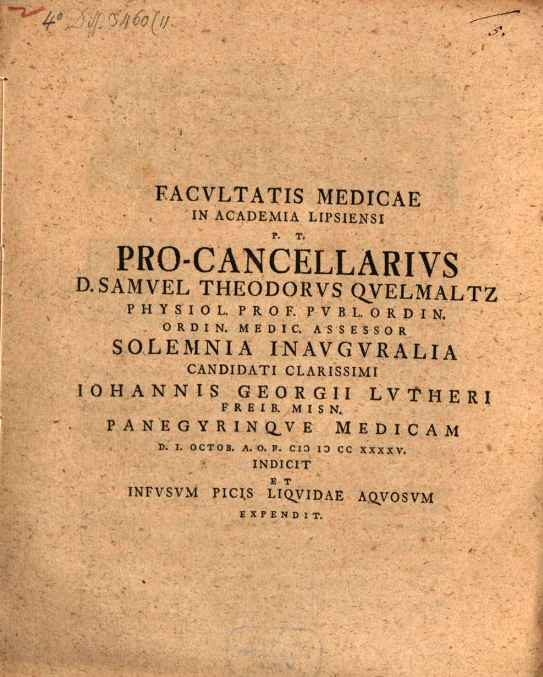
18th-century German manual on tar water.

In 1753, Henry Fielding, a Bow Street magistrate, faced serious health issues, suffering from gout and edema, which limited his mobility and required frequent medical interventions. His doctors suggested a warmer climate, prompting him to consider emigration. Initially aiming for Aix-en-Provence, he ultimately chose Portugal due to the challenges of traveling through France.

On June 26, 1754, Fielding left his London home and arrived at the port of Rotherhithe. He boarded the Queen of Portugal, recommended by a neighbor. The ship was commanded by Richard Veal, a seasoned officer mourning the loss of his wife. During the journey, Veal displayed strong emotions, particularly when a kitten fell overboard, highlighting a contrast between his attachment to the animal and his indifference toward his crew.

Fielding observed the crew's mockery as he was assisted onto the deck, remarking on the cruelty he perceived in human nature.

=== Ferry journey ===
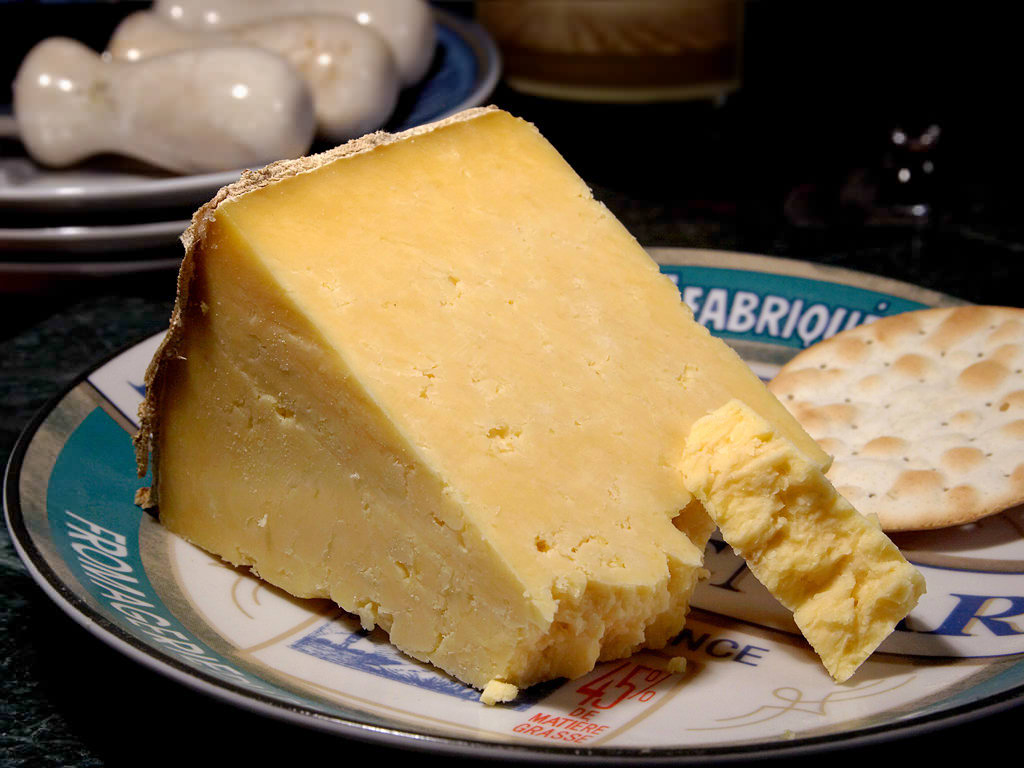
Piece of Cheshire cheese.

The ship was moored at the quayside, as the captain sought additional passengers and freight to enhance the trip's profitability. After an extended wait, he decided to set sail slowly down the Thames. Shortly after departure, the vessel collided with two other ships. Fortunately, the damage was minor and could be repaired in a few days. The journey then continued, subject to weak winds. The yacht drifted along the river, aided by the ebbing tides, and navigated along the coast as far as the Isle of Wight and Cornwall, unable to head toward the ocean.

Numerous stops allowed passengers to disembark, dine at inns, and occasionally spend the night. Fielding noted the rudeness of some innkeepers, particularly a Mrs. Francis in Ryde, who served unappetizing food at high prices. Most of the time, however, he was required to remain on board, sharing a cabin with the captain, whose snoring disrupted his rest. Next door was a seasick passenger who moaned incessantly. Fielding experienced discomfort and struggled with the swell as the ship finally sailed toward the Bay of Biscay. There, the wind diminished once more, impeding progress. This lull, while restful, allowed Fielding to contemplate the challenges of navigating nature. Fielding noted that, despite the commander's claim of being 'bewitched', his 'absolute power on board' seemed to have no effect on the indifference of the wind". This period also afforded the crew the opportunity to capture a shark, an unexpected addition to their provisions. One evening, near the end of the voyage, Fielding and his family rested on deck as the sun set and the moon rose. Fielding described this moment as "magical", offering a brief respite from the hardships they had previously endured. He noted that his book contained numerous anecdotes, some of which were derived from particularly disagreeable experiences.

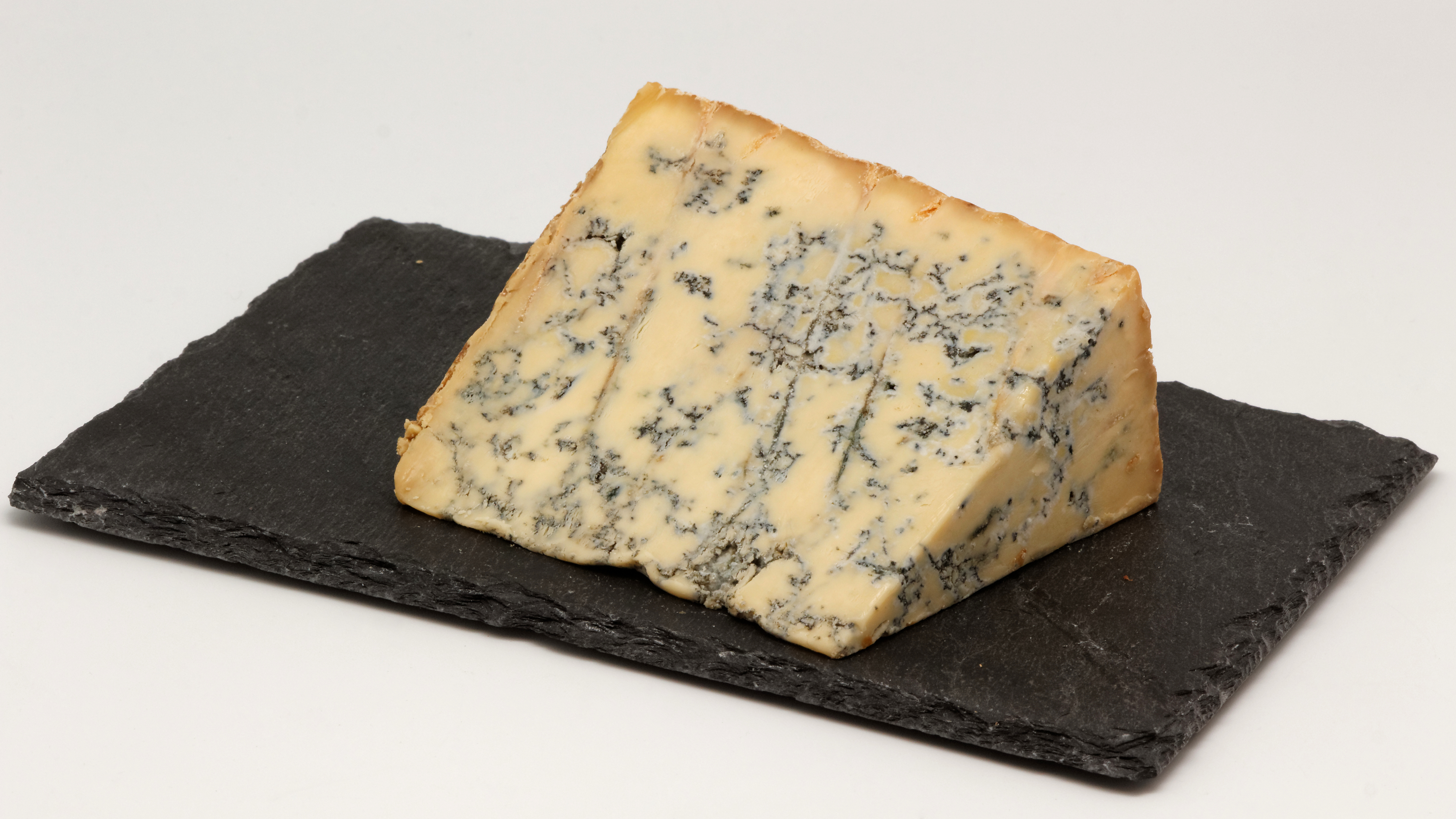
Stilton blue cheese.

The boat arrived in Lisbon on August 7. Initially impressed by the city’s brightness from a distance, Fielding later described it as "the most unpleasant in the world", lacking beauty and characterized by decrepit, haphazardly constructed buildings. In letters to his brother John, he expressed nostalgia for England, reminiscing about simple comforts such as turnips and fine cheeses. Fielding informed his publisher that prices in Lisbon were approximately three times higher than those in England. In the same correspondence, he announced the near completion of his voyage narrative, which he considered his best work. Two months later, on October 8, 1754, he died.

== Editorial, publication, and acceptance ==
The two editions published in 1755 differ significantly, and according to Martin C. Battestin, neither presents the complete original text. It is likely that the manuscript was left unfinished in the hands of an amanuensis, possibly William Aldrit, who accompanied Fielding and his wife to Lisbon and later engaged in secretarial work.

=== Editorial ===
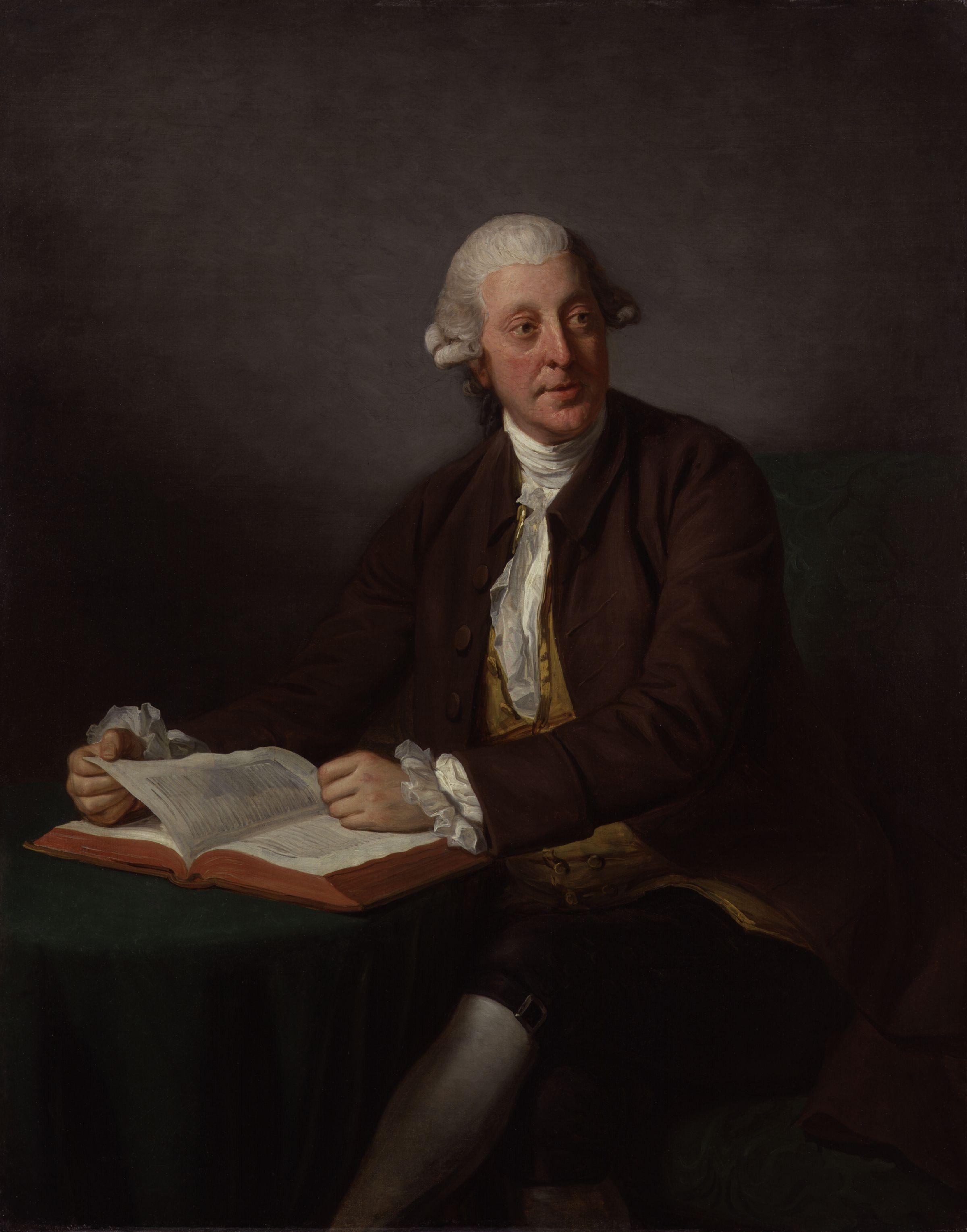
Portrait of Arthur Murphy by Nathaniel Dance, 17777

The first printing, known as The Francis Version, was published by William Straham and may have been edited by the author's brother, John Fielding, as suggested by Tom Keymer, annotator of the Penguin edition. John Fielding later undertook a more extensive revision, leading to The Humphry's Version, which was released in December 1755. This timing coincided with the disaster in Lisbon on November 1, which likely increased public interest and sales for publisher Andrew Millar.

Keymer argues that The Francis Version is superior as it preserves the original text's satire and humor. The differences primarily involve the portrayal of Commander Richard Veal, whom Fielding befriended during the voyage but later grew exasperated with in Lisbon. In the second version, descriptive details about Veal’s appearance and gentlemanly pretensions are removed, while references to his bravery are simplified. Notably, aspects such as his age, deafness, and voice are omitted, resulting in a less critical portrayal.

The Penguin edition reproduces The Francis Version, with minimal changes. Typos have been corrected, and some formatting adjustments have been made, including the reinstatement of erroneous dates to align with the chronology.

=== Publication ===
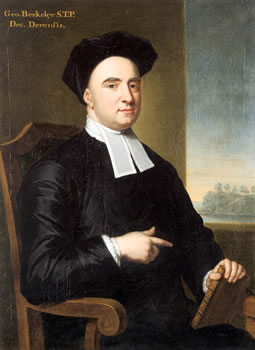
George Berkeley by John Smibert.jpg

Fielding's Diary was first published in a version intended for the benefit of his family, but it was significantly shorter than the version retained by Arthur Murphy, which serves as the reference for this article. The omitted passages primarily involve Fielding's reflections on the ship's commander. An earlier edition, containing these reflections, also exists. The unsigned introduction to the Project Gutenberg text notes this editing issue and refers to "Mr. Dobson", who published a separate edition of the book. Arthur Dodson explains that the first edition, initiated by Fielding's half-brother John, included a companion piece titled "Fragment on Bolingbroke", derived from Fielding's response to Lord Bolingbroke. The release was meticulously prepared with announcements in the Public Advertiser, beginning with a mention of February 6, 1755, followed by the publisher's details: "On Tuesday, the 25th current, will be published in a volume duodecimo, price 3s., bound, for the benefit of his wife and children, Journal d'un Voyage à Lisbonne. By the late Henry Fielding, Esq. To which is added Fragment of his Reply to Lord Bolingbroke, on sale at Andrew Millar's on the Strand". This advertisement continued until the 25th, when it was updated to indicate, "Today appears [...]".

=== Acceptance ===
The earliest readers of Fielding's work recognized that his literary career had come to a definitive end. In the months leading up to publication, funeral notices and tributes proliferated in the press, particularly in the Public Advertiser and the Whitehall Journal, preparing the public for a "work begun in suffering and ended practically at the same time as life". The Whitehall Journal raised concerns about whether Fielding's declining health, particularly severe liver damage, had affected his creative faculties.

Many contemporary readers expressed disappointment that a distinguished author like Fielding would focus on seemingly mundane aspects of life, documenting trivial encounters with anonymous passengers aboard a ship to Portugal. André Darlington notes that they may have overlooked how Fielding's novels diverged from those of his predecessors by emphasizing seemingly insignificant details that contributed to the narrative's overall substance, anchoring it in history and everyday experiences. Additionally, the Journal de la traversée aimed to critique outdated passenger transport laws and propose improvements. In the months following the publication of Amelia, Fielding seemed to focus more on health remedies, such as tar water recommended by George Berkeley, than on his literary pursuits. His diary reflects a man grappling with failing health, physical confinement, and anguish, all while maintaining a sharp political and social perspective. Monika Aliker Rabb suggests that the work emerges from the tension between public and private responsibility.

The combination of serious and humorous elements in the work led to confusion among many readers. Thomas Edwards expressed astonishment that someone facing death would engage in such trivial banter, while Arthur Murphy lamented that the work evoked the mindset of a condemned man joking on the scaffold.

Fielding was acutely aware of his deteriorating condition and engaged with suffering and death in a comic vein. This approach parallels later works by authors like Sterne and Cervantes, who also created in the face of personal anguish. Fielding's reflections illustrate his awareness of the gradual decay of his body, demonstrating a profound engagement with his mortality.

== The book prescription ==
The book opens with an unsigned dedication to the public, likely written by Arthur Murphy, who refers to the author in the third person.

=== Dedication to the public ===
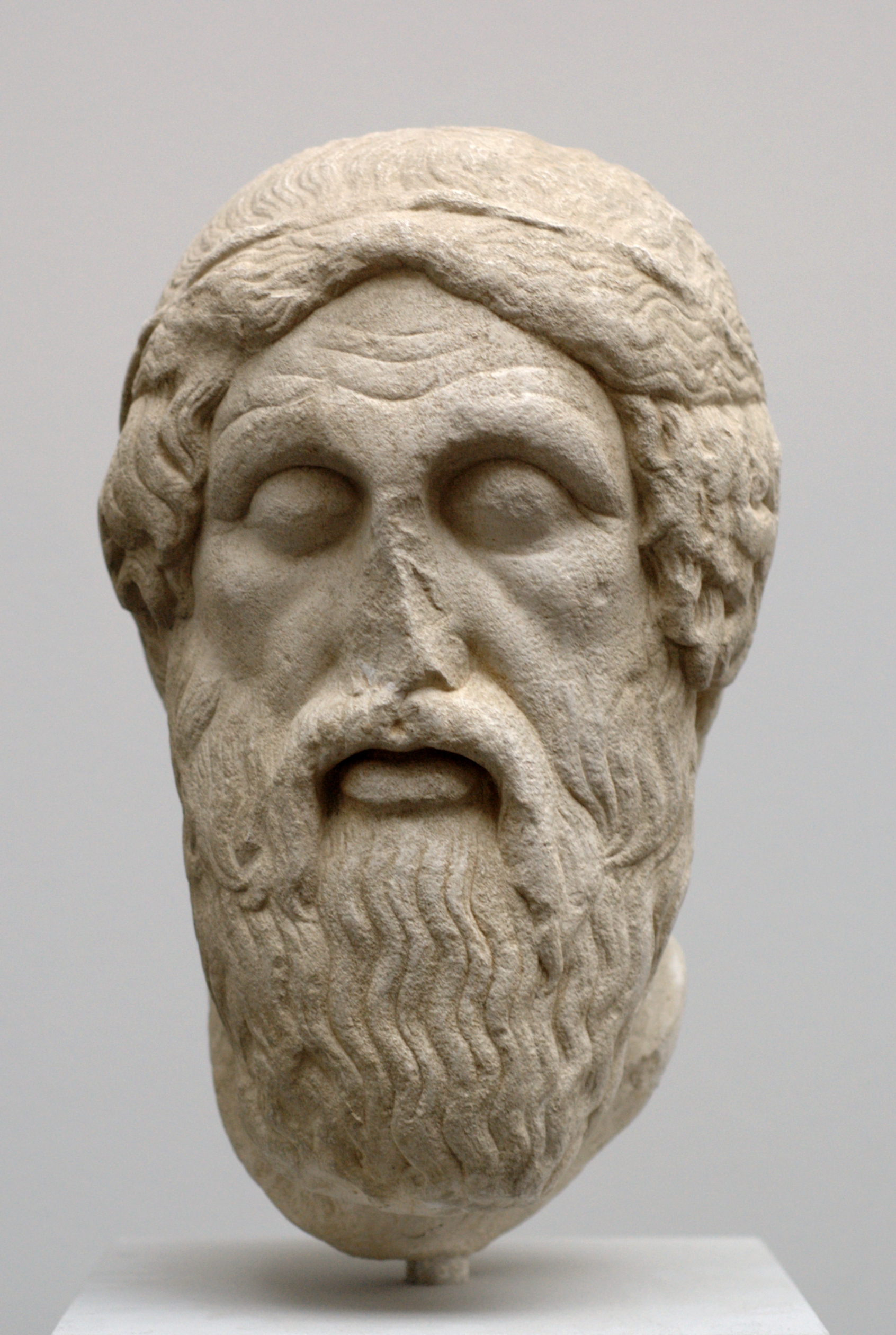
Portrait of Homer of the "Epimenides type", based on a Roman copy of a Greek original from the 5th century B.C., in the Glyptothek, Munich (Inv. 273).

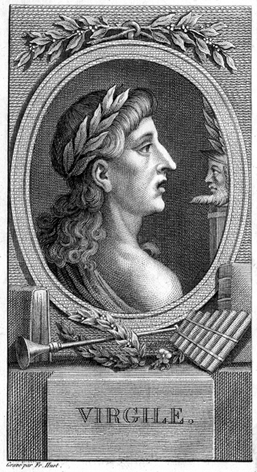
Presumed portrait of Virgil, engraving by F. Huot in the edition of Les Œuvres de Virgile by Abbé Des Fontaines (Paris, Billois, 1802).

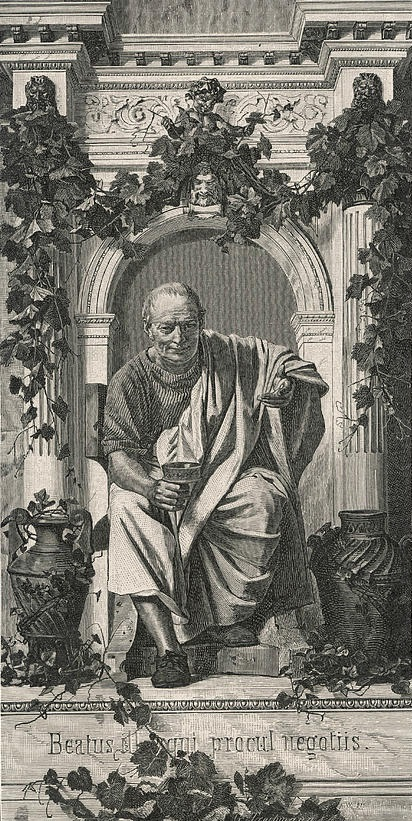
Imaginary portrait of Horace by Anton von Werner (1843-1915).

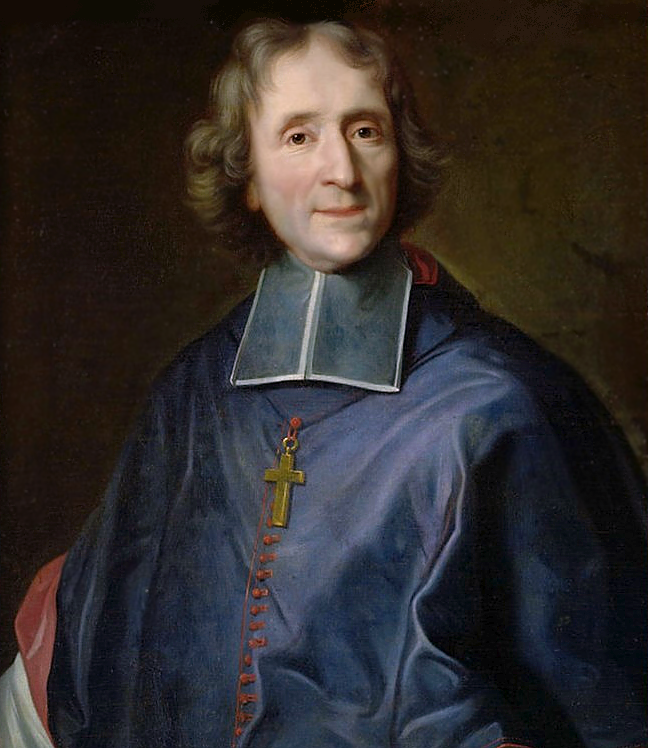
Portrait of Fénelon by Joseph Vivien.

From the outset, the reader's understanding is sought, as it is noted that "an almost extinguished lamp does not emit a light as frank and uniform as when it shines in all its vigor". The text highlights Fielding's physical state, emphasizing his frailty and diminished strength, which the work reflects. The dedication justifies the numerous references to travelers' conversations, asserting that they provide an authentic impression of people and customs, which are more enlightening than descriptions of landscapes. The author is commended for his communicative skill, likened to that of Homer and Fenelon, while acknowledging that this art is not universally shared among travelers. Criticism of the book is characterized as originating from "ignorant individuals who have never traveled either in books or on a ship". The seemingly mundane incidents recounted are intended not for their picturesque quality but for their educational value, offering observations and reflections. The humorous tone is defended as being akin to Horace's Satires. Should any reader remain unconvinced, it is asserted that the narrative holds public utility, focusing on reality rather than invention, and addressing political issues related to maritime law—a more modest yet accessible endeavor compared to broad societal reform.

=== The preface ===
Fielding's use of humor in his speech is layered with notations and allusions that can appear to undermine the seriousness of his message. This complex interplay is discussed in detail by Tom Keymer in the notes of the Penguin edition. The lengthy preface—six pages in the reference edition—resembles that of Joseph Andrews in its didactic intent, focusing on the nature and objectives of travel literature. It emphasizes the necessity for a deep understanding of the subject, a light tone, and a refined style. The traveler who shares their story with the public must possess a significant talent, which is not commonly found.

Fielding references notable figures such as Gilbert Burnet, known for his writings on Switzerland and Italy, and Joseph Addison for his descriptions of Italian provinces. Conversely, he critiques Dr. Zachary Grey for his overly detailed and redundant edition of Samuel Butler's Hudibras. He further explores the merits of authors like Homer and Fénelon, positioning their works as foundational to travel writing, unlike the narratives of ancient historians. The discussion extends to Pliny the Elder, whose fantastical elements are critiqued, as well as Sallustus and Titus Livius, with the latter noted for his eloquent embellishments of facts. Lord Anson's account of his global voyage is mentioned, praised for its fidelity to reality, alongside a critique of Horace. Fielding also reflects on his work, Shamela, which parodies Samuel Richardson's Pamela; or, Virtue Rewarded, and he expresses less leniency towards Richardson’s preface for Clarissa; or, The History of a Young Lady, following their previous disagreements.

The preface concludes with a declaration of the book’s primary purpose: to serve as a vehicle for the reform of Admiralty law.

=== Introduction ===
This narrative begins two years prior to the journey to Lisbon, with the first mention of events occurring in August 1753. The focus is primarily on medical concerns, including treatments for gout and a recommended cure in Bath by Mr. Randy, the King's first surgeon.

Fielding outlines his commitment to addressing the rampant violence and theft on public highways. With approval from authorities, particularly the Duke of Newcastle, he received £600 to initiate efforts against criminal gangs. Despite his significant fatigue, he aimed to dismantle these groups to prevent their reformation and to alleviate public fear. Although Fielding reflects on the potential for "vanity" in his achievements, he counters this notion by highlighting the modest financial compensation he received for extensive work, which he believed compromised his health. He recalls that his government pension was insufficient for his efforts, prompting him to resign and delegate his responsibilities to his brother, who had been his assistant. Fielding expresses his desire to support his family, asserting his love for them while acknowledging his sacrifices for public service.

He then articulates his literary intent, stating that the facts presented are to be understood by readers as they are. Following this, he recounts his health issues leading up to his departure. He underwent a puncture in the abdomen to relieve fourteen quarts of fluid, but other treatments, including diaphoretics, were ineffective. A subsequent puncture and a dose of laudanum provided him some relief.

In May 1754, Fielding relocated to a small house in Ealing, Middlesex, believed to offer the best air in the kingdom, shielded from the smoke and smells of London. However, after only three days of sunshine, his illness continued to progress, prompting concerns about an impending winter before he could recover. He found temporary hope in the tar water suggested by Bishop of Berkeley, recalling its mention in Charlotte Ramsay Lennox's Female Quixote. The idea of moving to a milder climate resurfaced, and after ruling out Aix-en-Provence, plans were made for a journey by river and sea from Gravesend in Kent. John Fielding, who had taken over judicial duties and was organizing the voyage, indicated that the ship would set sail within three days, although actual delays would extend this timeline.

=== The Journal ===
The journal begins on Wednesday, June 26, 1754, at the entrance of the Fielding home.

==== Layout of the text ====
The diary entries are recorded almost daily, with few exceptions on Sundays. The final entry is dated August 7, 1755, in the Bay of Lisbon, a city known for its seven hills. Fielding briefly notes the rows of whitewashed houses but quickly moves past this description, in keeping with a principle emphasized in the introductory chapters of his novels, particularly Joseph Andrews and Tom Jones. The journal concludes with two Latin quotations: the first from the Aeneid, "Egressi optata Troes potiuntur arena" ("The Trojans disembark and gain the long-awaited shore"), and the second from Horace, "- hic Finis chartæque viaque" ("here end, 'merrily', writes Fielding ironically, the story and the voyage"). Administrative formalities prevent him from disembarking until 7 p.m., and although the meal served in a hillside café is excellent, it is as costly as those found on the Bath road between Newbury and London.

==== Anecdotes from daily life ====
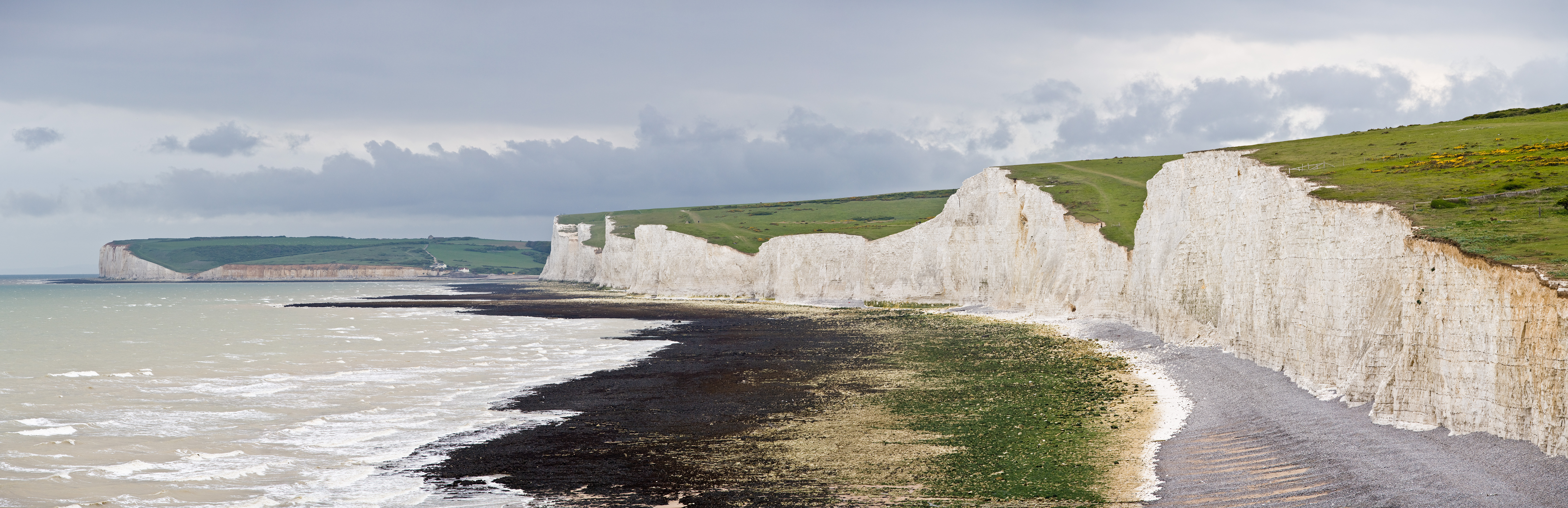
The Seven Sisters on the south-east Sussex coast.

The entries vary significantly in length. For instance, the entry for Friday, June 28, is brief, reporting the arrival of Dr. Hunter on board—before the ship has weighed anchor—as he performs a procedure involving ten quarts of fluid. Fielding has a short conversation with the captain, during which he expresses indifference regarding the prolonged departure. They both express satisfaction, particularly as the order is finally given to begin the descent of the Thames toward Gravesend, despite the lack of additional passengers or cargo. In contrast, the entry for Sunday, June 30, spans eight pages and includes various anecdotes and reflections. It mentions Mrs. Fielding's toothache and the difficulties faced by the valet as he tries to return to the ship while it drifts with the tide at eight knots. Fielding offers some critical observations about human ingratitude, noting that the commander had not informed anyone of his intention to sail towards the Kent Downs under forced sail, despite Fielding’s earlier communication of his patience. This entry provides an opportunity for Fielding to describe the shoreline from the deck or his cabin.

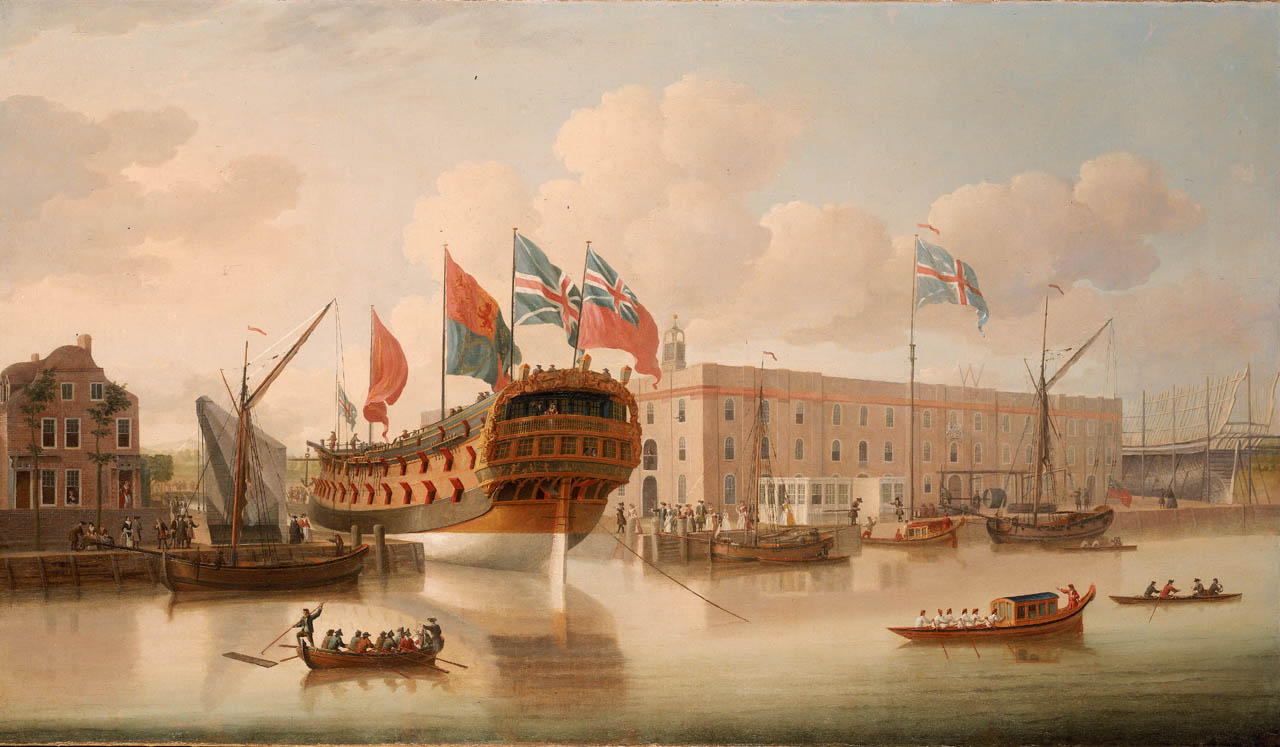
Launch of the 4th-rate liner, the St Albans, at the Deptford shipyard in 1747, by John Cleveley the Elder.

These descriptions are quite rare and lack any picturesque quality, a concept largely absent from the literature of the early 18th century. The language used is general and somewhat formulaic, drawing from the poetic diction of earlier writers like John Dryden and contemporaries such as James Thomson. Neutral adjectives such as "fair" and "bright" are used to describe the weather, while terms like "pleasant" and "noble" characterize the Deptford shipyards.

==== Body decomposition ====
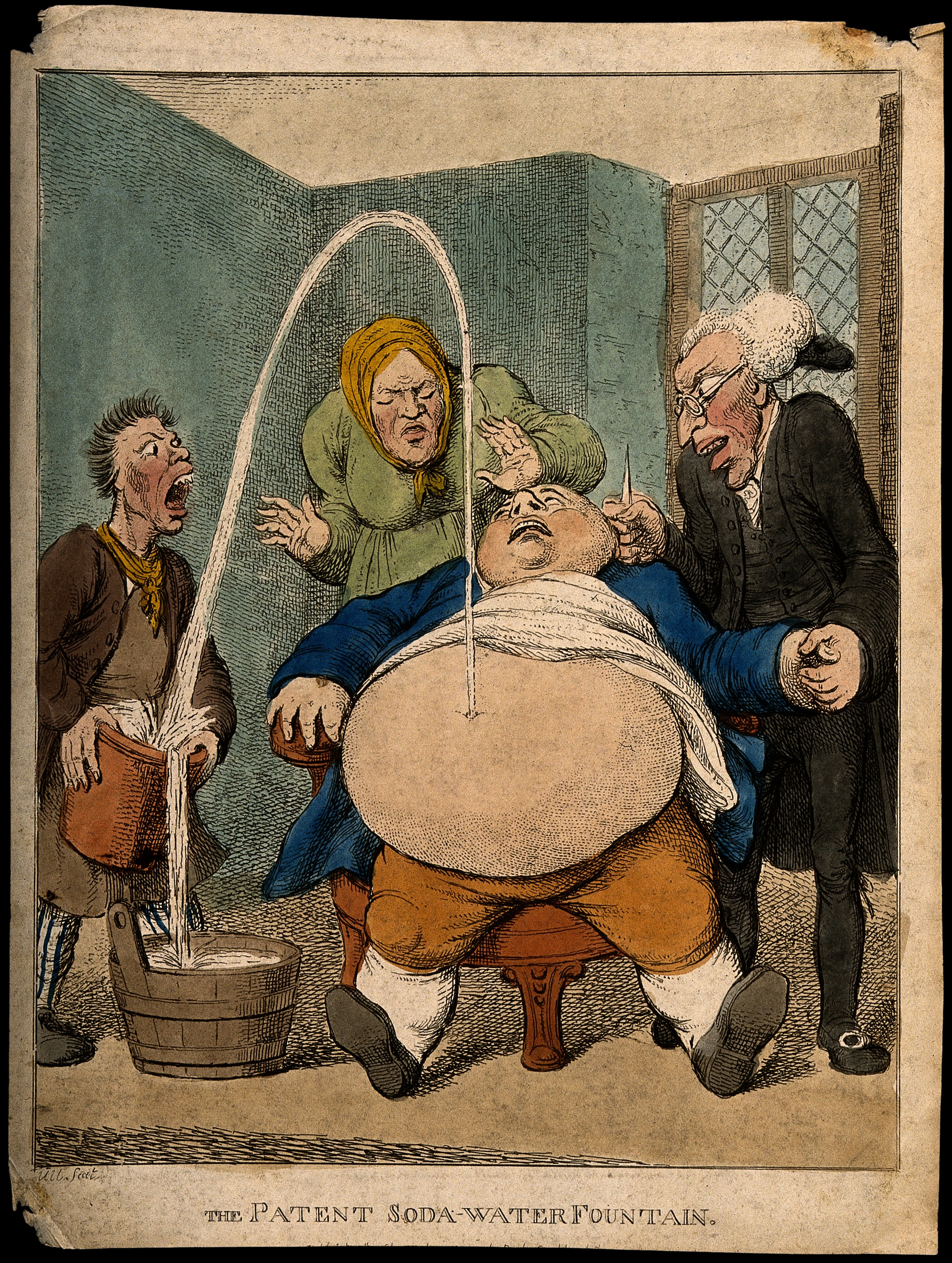
Humorous illustration of an abdominal paracentesis (or laparocentesis) performed on a patient suffering, like Henry Fielding, from severe ascites complicating end-stage liver cirrhosis.

Fielding's diary provides a clear account of his declining health, detailing the deterioration of his body. Instances of good health are infrequent, and the writing reflects a sense of impending mortality, with Fielding expressing doubt about completing his work. As the diary progresses, his condition worsens, showing symptoms like jaundice and asthma, and he describes his situation as a combination of ailments leading to his decline.

The narrative is heavily influenced by themes of illness, reminiscent of Defoe's accounts of decay during the plague. Death is a constant presence, with references to fatigue and physical decline. Fielding's frankness contrasts with his frustration over his landlady’s well-meaning but insensitive comments about his health.

Fielding describes his deteriorating health within a world marked by decay and suffering, presenting this reality with great detail. His tone combines seriousness with humor, addressing everyday frustrations, such as the difficulties in finding medical help for himself and his wife. Recurring misfortunes, like bad weather and an uncooperative meal, illustrate his struggles. Despite the overall gloom, there are lighter moments, such as a cat being rescued from the sea, which allows for a humorous aside. Fielding frequently reflects on mortality, drawing connections between personal experiences and broader themes, such as loss and the passage of time. His observations become increasingly resigned, highlighting his role as a witness to both his decline and the universal struggles around him.

I saw the summer mouldering away, or rather, indeed, the year passing away without intending to bring on any summer at all. In the whole month of May, the sun scarce appeared three times. So that the early fruits came to the fullness of their growth, and to some appearance of ripeness, without acquiring any real maturity; having wanted the heat of the sun to soften and meliorate their juices. I saw the dropsy gaining rather than losing ground; the distance growing still shorter between the tappings. I saw the asthma likewise beginning again to become more troublesome. I saw the midsummer quarter drawing towards a close.

==== Parallel events ====
Fielding frequently draws parallels between the movements of the ship and his health struggles. When the wind blows favorably, he experiences brief relief, symbolizing a momentary escape from his physical pain. Conversely, when the ship is becalmed, his condition worsens. This connection highlights the human struggle against forces beyond one’s control, linking his personal ailments to broader societal issues.

He frequently discusses the concept of the state as a "body politic", highlighting the impact of corruption on society. In The Historical Register, he notes that corruption leads to the downfall of both society and the individual. Fielding often targets the avarice of the elite, making analogies between public and private spheres in his writings, particularly in An Enquiry into the Late Increase of Robbers.

The great Increase of Robberies within these few years, is an Evil which […] seems (tho' already so flagrant) not to have arrived to that Height of which it is capable, and which it is likely to attain: For Diseases in the Political, as in the natural Body, seldom fail going on their Crisis, especially when nourished and encouraged by Faults in the Constitution.

His analyses reveal a society plagued by corruption, where the wealthy thrive while the poor suffer. Fielding argues that the state, much like a sick body, requires treatment, proposing solutions to address its ills. He equates his fight against crime with his struggle against disease, illustrating how his public efforts often come at the cost of his health, as his physical ailments worsened even as he worked to combat societal corruption.

==== A magistrate on probation ====
Nathalie Bernard argues that Henry Fielding's experiences as a magistrate and journalist significantly impacted his later work. However, she contends that the references to food in the narrative appear more driven by personal obsession than by the public interest that the text claims to address.

Fielding’s experience as a judge is evident in his Diary, where he offers advice to lawmakers, positioning himself as a monitor who highlights faults and informs on duties. This reflects his earlier role in publications like the Jacobite's Journal and The Covent-Garden Journal, where he acted as a "censor" in the tradition of Joseph Addison and Richard Steele, aiming to correct societal behaviors. In this work, he shifts from satire to propose measures aimed at addressing the issues created by the wealthy elite who contribute to public hardship.

The connection between the magistrate and the author conscious of writing his last book is preserved: right to the end, Fielding wanted to make himself useful; as he writes not without gravity, "I have scattered my various remarks throughout this journey, rather satisfied to end my life as I have probably lost it, in the service of my country".

== The twists and turns of irony ==
Fielding's Journal follows an almost uninterrupted ironic thread that takes many forms.

=== Parodic swelling ===
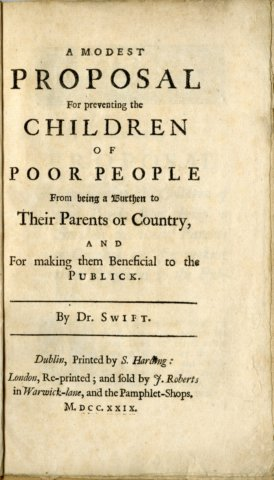
A Modest Proposal, 1729 edition.

Fielding attempts to present serious arguments but occasionally veers into exaggeration. For instance, when discussing the benefits of fish, he suggests that a rigged market denies the poor access to this resource, but he also makes references to punitive measures against fishmongers. This commentary highlights his criticism of the economic system and those who profit at the expense of the underprivileged. His views on these issues align with broader critiques of social inequality, although his expression of such concerns can be hyperbolic at times.

=== The grotesque authorities ===
Fielding also employs a distinctive form of irony, undermining his claims by referencing absurd authorities, such as comparing himself to a fictional narrator rather than a renowned writer like Cervantes. While he claims to approach his remarks playfully, he does so with a sense of amusement, making tongue-in-cheek praises of his work. He dismisses other authors' theories as trivial and expresses a desire to initiate significant legal changes in maritime matters, reminiscent of the absurdity seen in the theater critiques of his time.

=== Suspiciously voluble ===
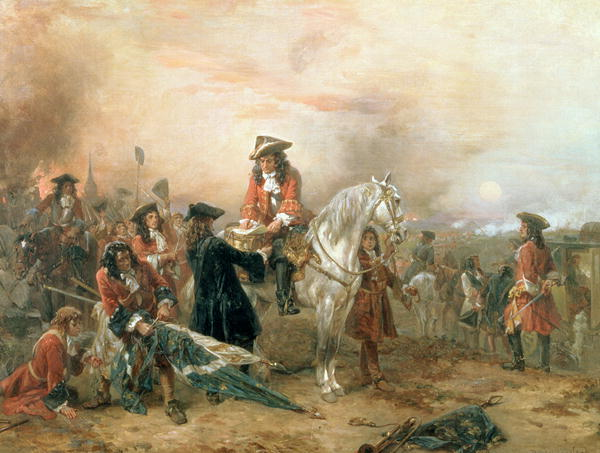
The Duke of Marlborough signing a dispatch at Blenheim. Oil on canvas by Robert Alexander Hillingford.

Fielding reaches a high level of ambiguous subtlety when he requests a posthumous pension to support his family. He argues that such a gesture would inspire young magistrates to strive for the same efforts he made, using examples of punishment and reward to support his point.

For it is very hard, my lord", said a convicted felon at the bar to the late excellent judge Burnet, "to hang a poor man for stealing a horse." "You are not to be hanged sir", answered my ever-honoured and beloved friend, "for stealing a horse, but you are to be hanged that horses may not be stolen". In like manner it might have been said to the late Duke of Marlborough, when the parliament was so deservedly liberal to him, after the battle of Blenheim, "You receive not these honours and bounties on account of a victory past, but that other victories may be obtained.

On the surface, Fielding's comments about the Duke of Marlborough and Judge Burnet seem straightforward: he believes Marlborough's rewards are deserved and that Burnet's punishment of a thief is justified. However, the excessive praise for Burnet raises questions, as phrases like "the late excellent Judge Burnet" and "my forever honored and loved friend" contrast sharply with the harshness of his sentence. This is especially notable given Fielding's criticisms of capital punishment and public executions, where he expressed concern for the poor driven to crime by necessity.

Fielding's references to Burnet evoke thoughts of Pope's depiction of judges who prioritize their interests over justice. Similarly, he acknowledges the complexities surrounding Marlborough, who was involved in a major political scandal that led to significant consequences for those involved. Fielding had previously linked the Duke to the corrupt practices of the political elite.

After these reflections, Fielding shifts back to a lighter tone, humorously remarking on his precarious situation: "If they don't hang me at this session, they're sure to do it at the next".

== Deceptive satire in travel writing ==
In his preface, Fielding makes a vague allusion to a play, whose title he never gives, "by Aphra Behn or Susanna Centlivre", in which "this vice of travel journals is ridiculed with finesse".

=== Travel literature: satire, parody or imitation? ===
In his work, Fielding appears to critique the genre of travel writing, particularly works like Aphra Behn's The Feign’d Curtezans, where the character Timothy Tickletext embodies the genre's shortcomings. Tickletext's travel diary, which documents his time in Rome, focuses on superficial details such as the weather while dismissing the city's aesthetic and cultural value, all while asserting that his observations serve the "good of the nation".

Fielding, in his Diary, asserts that he aims to avoid similar pitfalls. However, he occasionally falls into the same patterns, comparing Rome unfavorably to England and framing his account as serving a "public utility." This creates a paradox: while Fielding seeks to satirize the genre of travel writing, his work sometimes mirrors the very characteristics he critiques.

George Anson's expedition route.

Fielding also critiques the overly detailed, yet unengaging style of popular travel accounts, such as Voyage around the world (1748), dismissing them as "heaps of dulness." Despite this, his diary suggests a familiarity with these works, particularly those about Lisbon, like Udal ap Rhys’s Account of the Most Remarkable Places in Spain and Portugal (1749) and William Bromley’s Several Years Travels (1702).

Bromley, critical of Lisbon, describes the city as a chaotic maze, while ap Rhys praises its beauty, comparing it to Rome. Fielding, while initially echoing these standard views, avoids their clichés but ultimately falls into the same pattern of exaggerated praise or criticism. This oscillation highlights the difficulties of creating authentic travel writing in a genre filled with stereotypes.

=== The subversion of stated intentions ===
Fielding aligns his writing with the tradition of Homer and Virgil, suggesting they, too, wrote travelogues in their way. In the preface to Joseph Andrews, he calls his work "a comic Epic-Poem in Prose", and this style carries over into his Diary, which references both the Odyssey and the Aeneid. While he claims his story is not fictional, he admits to embellishing certain details, likening this to a sailor's account that may include minor exaggerations.

This creates a contradiction: the narrator alternates between dismissing fiction and undermining his claims. The Diary seeks to present factual material in an artistic way, often reflecting characters and scenes from his novels. For example, the innkeeper in Ryde, Mrs. Francis, bears similarities to characters in Joseph Andrews and Pamela.

Tom Keymer argues that Fielding's romanticized portrayal allows him to parody the very travel literature he critiques, including works by Bromley and Rhys. By exaggerating their xenophobia and extravagance, Fielding mocks their conventions. His anecdote about capturing a shark in the Bay of Biscay, for instance, follows typical travel literature tropes. Fielding's emphasis on the "public usefulness" of his book—especially in his call for a "Society of Antiquarians"—also serves as a form of self-parody.

== The classic parody ==
Fielding's use of The Odyssey and The Aeneid is an ironic parody, as he portrays himself as a flawed, comically inept version of Odysseus or Aeneas. He mocks both his journey and the traditional comparisons of London to Troy, as well as the legend that connects Odysseus to the founding of Lisbon.

=== Pathetic echoes ===
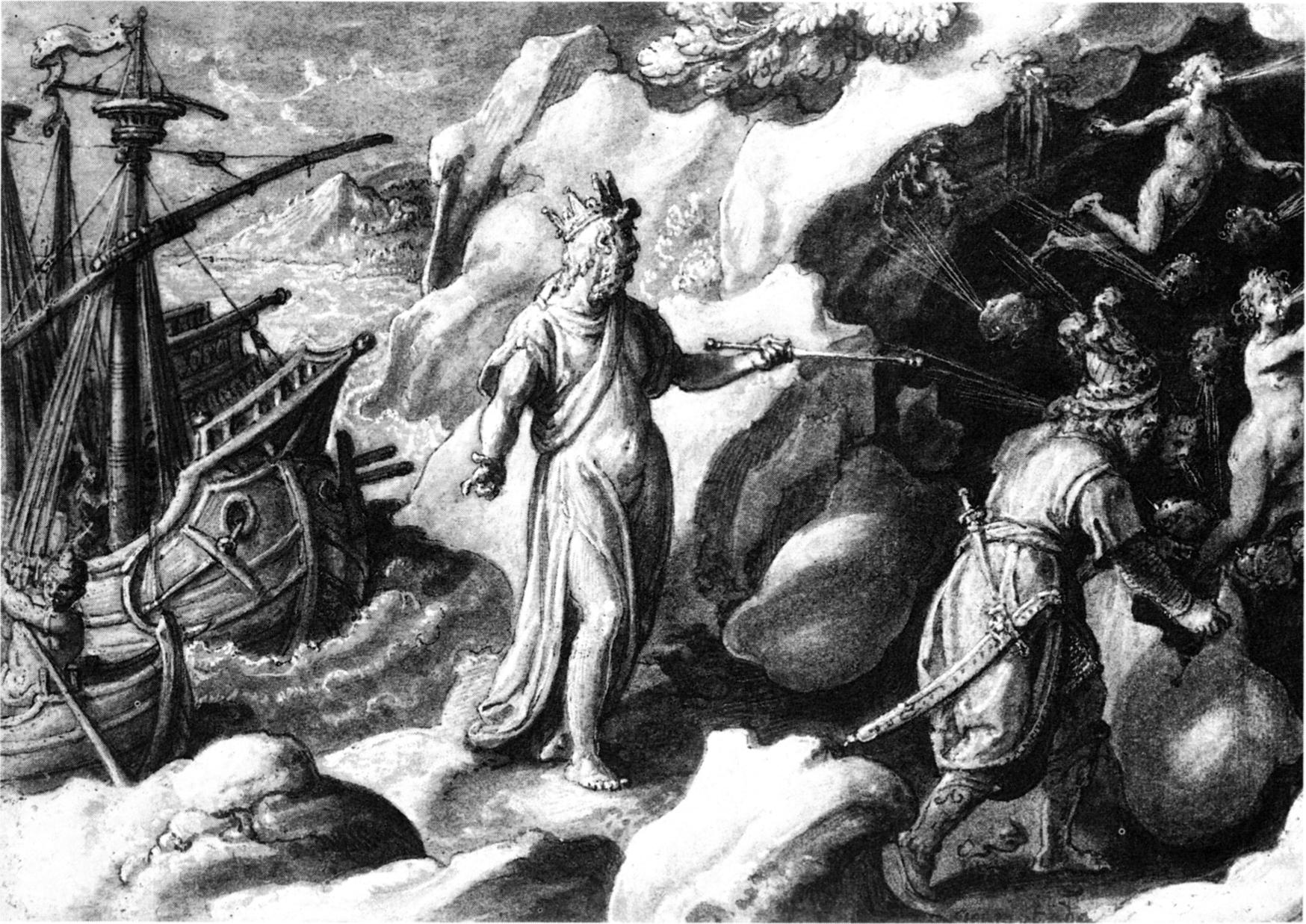
Jan van der Straet, Ulysses in the Cave of the Winds (Rotterdam, Museum Boijmans Van Beuningen).

Fielding explicitly compares his departure from London to Aeneas’ flight from Troy, noting, “the same wind that Juno would have solicited from Aeolus if Aeneas had had to set sail for Lisbon".

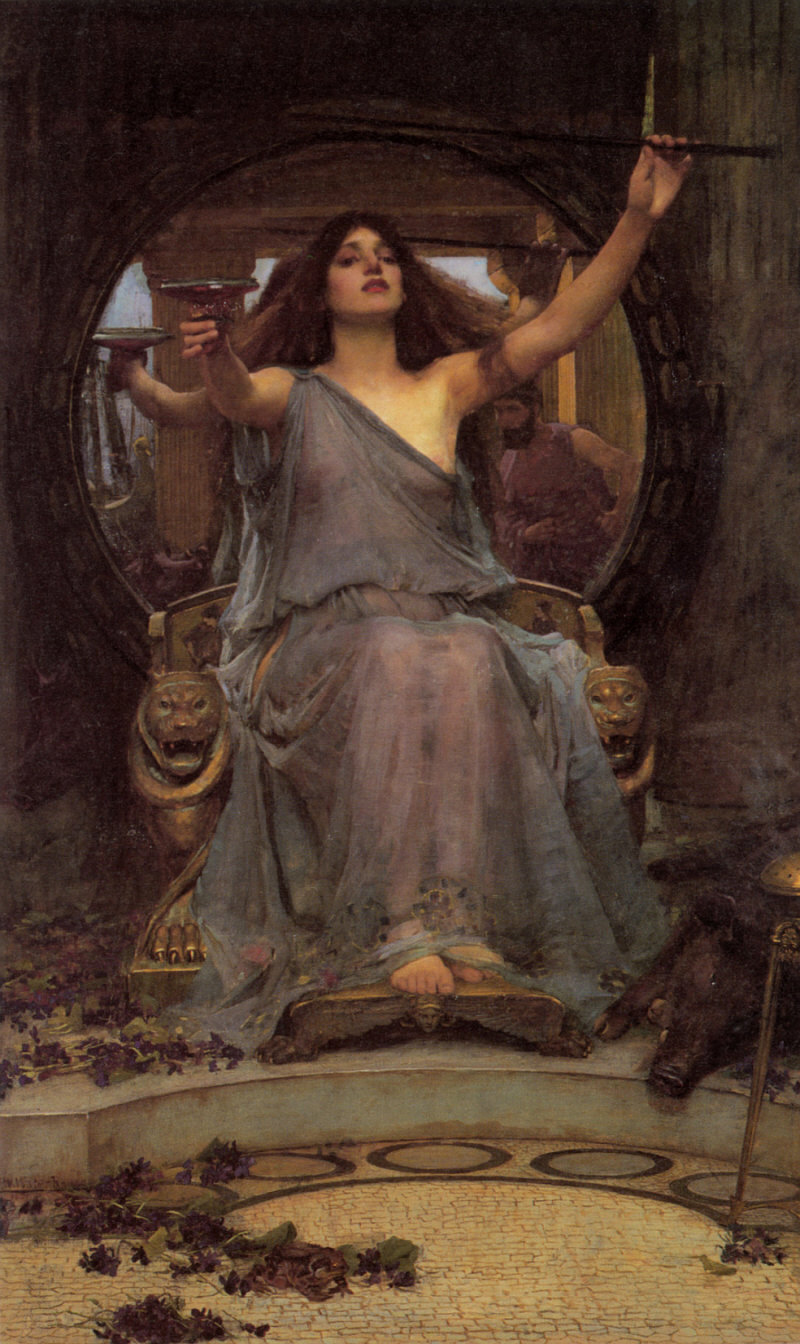
Circe offering the cup to Ulysses, by John William Waterhouse.

He repeats this analogy later, playing with mythological references to emphasize his self-deprecating humor. For instance, he likens the innkeeper Mrs. Francis to a fury or witch from a distant island, humorously suggesting that the Isle of Wight, with its lush scenery, mirrors Circe's enchanted domain. In his portrayal, Mrs. Francis is a cheap version of Circe, charging high prices for low-quality services. Fielding also draws on mythological tropes when he claims to have purchased venison from Southampton, attributing it to the whims of Fortuna, further aligning himself with the figure of Ulysses as he enjoys the island’s pleasures.

By blending the grandeur of ancient epics with the trivialities of everyday life, Fielding evokes a sense of melancholy. The contrast between the heroic myths and the mundane events he describes highlights a poignant imbalance between fading literary glory and the ordinariness of his circumstances. This tension recalls themes he explored in A Voyage from this World to the Next, suggesting an impending transition, yet the winds seem to be blowing away from home, hinting at a sense of finality.

=== Subversion and nostalgia ===
Fielding's Diary serves to reframe classic Greek and Latin texts, presenting their grand narratives in more realistic terms. Nathalie Bernard notes that Fielding uses an epic style to elevate the everyday events and characters he encounters during his journey. This approach aligns with Mikhail Bakhtin's concept of parody, where the elevated world of gods and heroes is recontextualized in contemporary language and settings.

Bernard also draws on Gérard Genette's idea of intertextuality, pointing out that Fielding’s diary references a mix of English works, including John Crowe's Sir County Nice and Shakespeare's Macbeth, alongside classical texts by Homer, Virgil, Ovid, and Horace. These literary allusions establish Fielding as a learned figure, setting him apart from the ordinary characters he portrays—such as an uneducated innkeeper or rude customs officer. This intertextuality creates a dynamic with the reader, inviting them to engage with these references while reinforcing Fielding’s authority.

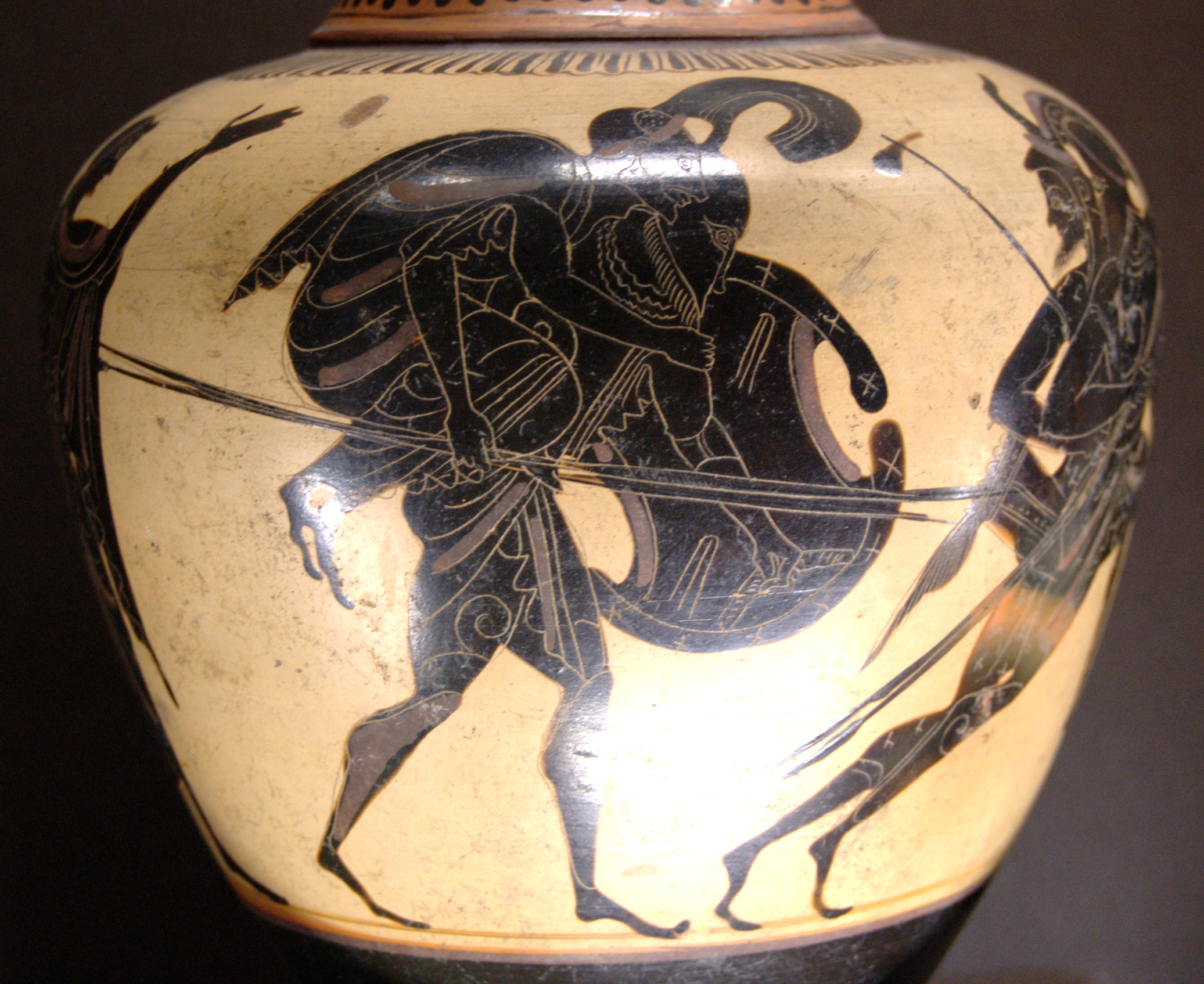
Aeneas leaves Troy with his father Anchises in his arms, black-figured oenochoe, c. 520-510BC, Musée du Louvre (F 118).

In Diary, Fielding reinterprets mythological narratives, transforming their extraordinary elements into allegories for everyday life. Characters and situations in his journey are presented in a way that mirrors classical tales: the girls in brothels evoke Circe’s enchantment, the innkeeper intoxicates the crew like a mythological figure, and the captain’s struggles echo Ulysses’ challenges. Like Aeneas, Fielding departs from a troubled past and seeks a new beginning, symbolically cleansing the English capital of its underworld.

This blend of heroic and comic styles contrasts the ordinary with the grandeur of epic narratives. By juxtaposing the trivialities of life with themes of heroism, Fielding conveys a sense of disillusionment, highlighting the human struggles that lie beneath the surface of everyday life. While his life may not match the grandeur of classical heroes, Fielding suggests that its human aspects possess their form of dignity. In the end, his narrative reflects a belief in the enduring power of imagination, which elevates the mundane to a higher plane.

== General conclusion ==
Only five letters from Fielding to his half-brother John have survived, offering a glimpse into his experiences aboard the Queen of Portugal and in Lisbon. These letters blend humor with frustration as Fielding adjusts to his new environment.

The comedic tone is evident in several anecdotes, such as the valet William's drunken return to England and Fielding’s longing for familiar food, leading him to request that a cook be sent. The awkward flirtations of the elderly commander, Richard Veal, with Mary Fielding's maid, Isabella, further add to the absurdity, as does Mary’s constant lamenting over her exile. Through these stories, Fielding portrays the humor and challenges of daily life while navigating his new surroundings.

=== Captain Richard Veal ===
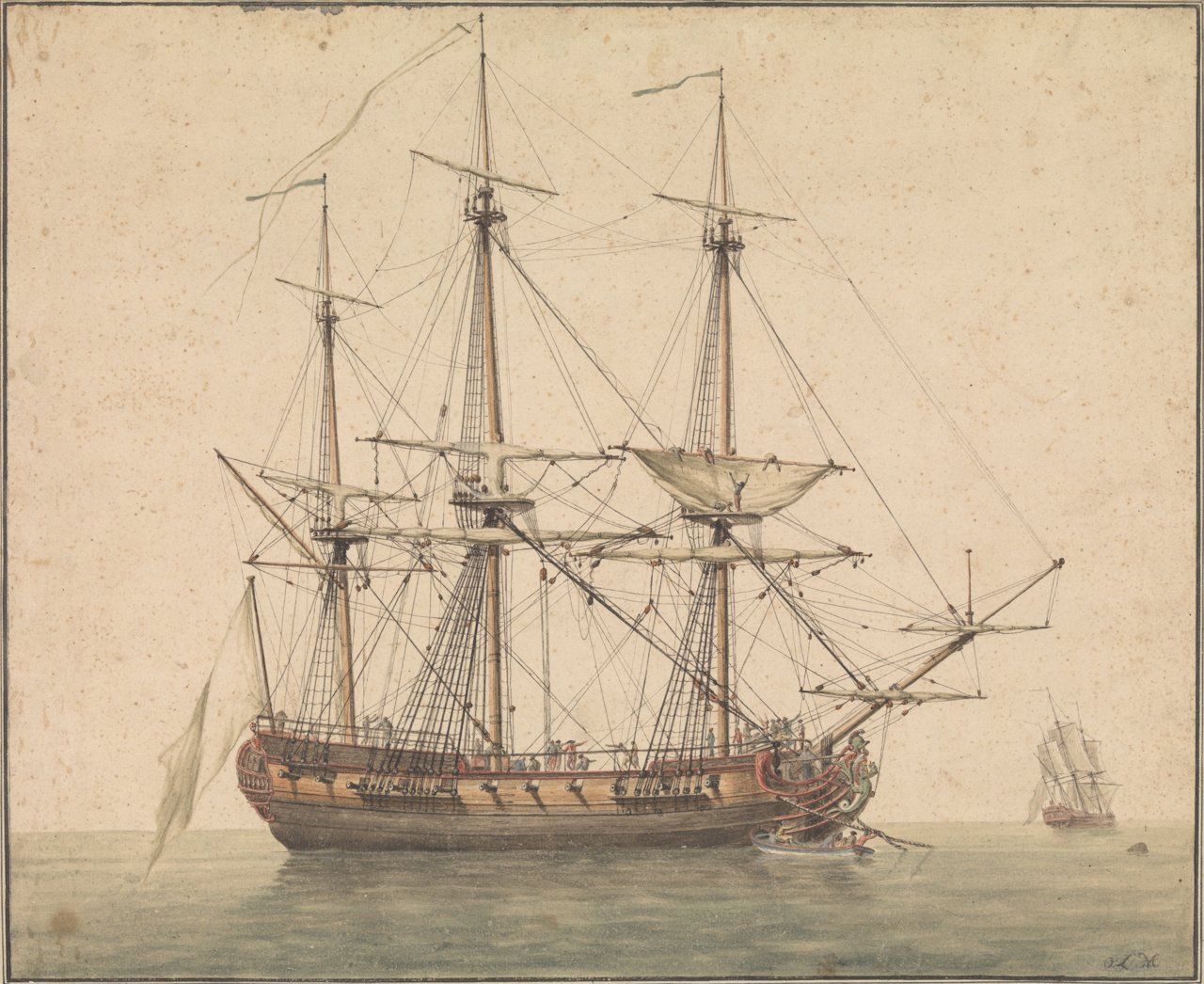
A 6th-rank vessel (or frigate of 12), of the type readily used by privateers in racing warfare.

Captain Richard Veal is a prominent figure in Fielding's Diary, where he is depicted with a mix of intrigue and admiration. Fielding had known Veal prior to their journey and spent six weeks with him aboard the Queen of Portugal and in Lisbon. Throughout the Diary, Fielding offers insights into Veal's extensive career as a yachtsman, emphasizing his forty-six years of sailing experience, various successes, and occasional setbacks. Veal, however, remains somewhat enigmatic, using a pseudonym for the ship he commanded during the War of Jenkins' Ear.

Veal was likely born in Exeter in January 1686, although details of his early life are scarce. He married Margaret Brown in 1733, but after a series of legal disputes and her death in 1734, he remarried in 1735 to Jane King, who died in 1754, shortly before Fielding met him. Veal commanded several ships throughout his career, beginning with the Saudades. His privateering ventures began in 1744 aboard the Hunter, where he captured several enemy vessels. In 1745, he took command of the Inspector, capturing merchant ships until a storm in 1748 led to the loss of many crew members in Tangier Bay, a controversial incident that generated public discussion for years.

Despite this setback, Veal continued his career with the Dreadnought, capturing multiple ships, including the French merchant ship Assomption de Marseille. His actions, however, sometimes led to legal challenges over the legitimacy of his captures. From 1740 to 1755, he commanded the Queen of Portugal, which Fielding boarded. Veal was among the first to report on the Lisbon earthquake of November 1, 1755. He later took command of a new ship, the Prince of Wales, but died in June 1756, leaving it unclear whether he ever encountered Fielding's Journal.

=== Notes on Lisbon ===
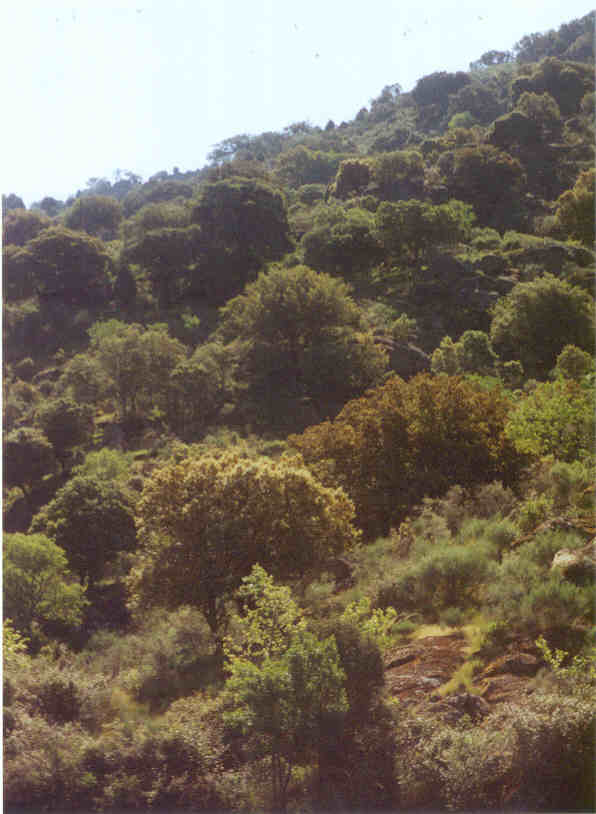
Moist grove of Quercus ilex (holm oak).

Fielding's arrival in Portugal is briefly mentioned in the last two pages of the entry for "Wednesday, August 7", where he offers some sharp observations about his first impressions of the city, notably comparing it unfavorably to Palmyra.

If a man was suddenly removed from Palmyra thither, and should take a view of no other city, in how glorious a light would the ancient architecture appear to him? And what desolation and destruction of arts and sciences would he conclude had happened between the several areas of these cities?

For further details, Fielding’s letters to his brother John, written in the days following his arrival, provide more insight into his impressions. He notes the frequent religious processions taking place in the streets and remarks on the dry winter, which left the earth parched and the atmosphere heavy. He mentions the term "kill", referring to lime kilns in the area. This observation is similar to that of George Whitefield, who, in March, had witnessed similar processions as locals prayed for rain.

Fielding also references "Bellisle Castle", which refers to the Torre de Belém, a well-known landmark in Lisbon. He had rented a villa in a neighborhood near the tower, which he compares to Kensington in England, where the royal court resided at the time. Additionally, he mentions an English hermit, possibly living in a convent or one of the many hermitages in the town of Sintra, which is located near Lisbon. This hermitage is locally referred to as the "Cork convent" due to the area's humidity promoting the growth of cork trees.

=== Fielding's death and a possible key to his Journal ===
Fielding died on October 8, 1754, under somewhat ironic circumstances. Just eight days after his death, the Public Advertiser reported that he was in perfect health, stating that the gout had left him and that his appetite had returned. A month later, the paper issued a correction, expressing regret over the misleading announcement. For many years, admirers searched for his grave in Lisbon’s English cemetery, but it wasn’t until 1830 that a monument was erected, almost by chance. In 1847, Dora Quillinan remarked that it "perhaps covers the bones of an idiot".

As Fielding’s journey nears its end in his Journal, there is a poignant moment when the passengers experience a tranquil evening at sea—clear skies, a beautiful sunset, and a full moon. Fielding reflects on the insignificance of human achievements compared to the grandeur of nature: "Compared with so much splendor, the ornaments of the theater scarcely merit the consideration of a child." This passage serves as a quiet farewell to the literary world and public life, as Fielding contemplates the beauty of the natural world.

Fielding's wife, Mary Daniel Fielding, lived on for nearly fifty years after his death, dying in 1802 at the age of eighty. After his passing, she moved to her son Ralph Allen’s home near Canterbury, where she spent the remainder of her life.

== Bibliography ==
=== General works ===
- Stapleton, Michael (1983). The Cambridge Guide to English Literature. London: Hamlyn. ISBN 0-600-33173-3.
- Drabble, Margaret; Harvey, Sir Paul (1985). The Oxford Companion to English literature. Oxford New York: Oxford University Press. ISBN 978-0-19-866130-6.
- Sanders, Andrew (1996). The Oxford History of English Literature (Revised ed.). Oxford: Oxford University Press. ISBN 0-19-871156-5.
- Lautel, Alain (31 May 2000). Fielding (1707-1754). In : Jean-Claude Polet (in French). Bruxelles: De Boeck Université. pp. 230–244. ISBN 2-8041-3162-9.

=== Specific works ===
==== Text ====
- Fielding, Henry (1755). The Journal of a Voyage to Lisbon (Revised in 2013 ed.). Londres: Murphy.
- Fielding, Henry. The Journal of a Voyage to Lisbon. The University of Adelaide.
- Fielding, Henry (1996). The Journal of a Voyage to Lisbon. Harmondsworth: Penguin Books. ISBN 0-14-043487-9.
- Fielding, Henry (2012). The Journal of a Voyage to Lisbon. Cambridge: Cambridge University Press. p. 134.

==== French translations ====
- Fielding, Henry (1783). Voyage de Londres à Lisbonne (in French). Lausanne: François Grasset. p. 237.
- Fielding, Henry (2009). Voyage de Londres à Lisbonne. Translated by Bernard, Nathalie. Aix-Marseille: Université de Provence. p. 186.

==== Correspondence ====
- Fielding, Henry (1993). The Correspondance of Henry and Sarah Fielding (Martin C. Battestin et CLive T. Probyn ed.). Oxford: Clarendon Press. pp. 109–113.

The life of Fielding

- Rogers, Pat (1979). Henry Fielding : A Biography. New York: Scribner's.
- Dudden, F. Home (1966). Henry Fielding : his Life, Works and Times. Hamden: Archon Books.
- Cross, Wilbur (1918). The History of Henry Fielding. New Haven: Yale University Press.
- Battestin, Martin; Battestin, Ruthe (1989). Henry Fielding : a Life. London: Routledge. ISBN 0-415-01438-7.
- Harris, James (1991). Clive D. Probin, The Sociable Humanist: The LIfe and Works of James Harris (1709-1780). Oxford: Oxford Clarendon Press.
- Murphy, Arthur (1762). "The Works of Henry Fielding". Essay on the LIfe and Genius of Henry Fielding, Esq. 4.
- Macallister, Hamilton (1967). Fielding. London: Evans.
- Raussen, G. J. (1968). Henry Fielding. London: Routledge and Kegan Paul. p. 162.
- Pagliaro, Harold (1998). Henry Fielding : A Literary Life. New York: St Martin's Press.
- Paulson, Ronald (2000). The Life of Henry Fielding : A Critical Biography. Malden: Blackwell Publishing.
- Bree, Linda (2007). The Cambridge Companion to Henry Fieding. Cambridge: Cambridge University Press. ISBN 978-0-521-67092-0.

==== Collections of essays and articles ====
- Paulson, R.; Lockwood, Thomas (1969). The Critical Heritage. London: Routledge and Kegan Paul.
- Paulson, R. A Collection of Critical Essays. New Jersey: Prentice Hall.
- Williams, I. (1970). The Criticism of Henry Fielding. Londres: Routledge and Kegan Paul. p. 377.
- Battestin, Martin C (2000). A Henry Fielding Companion. Westport, Connecticut: Greenwood Publishing Company. p. 333.

Articles related to the book

- Deep'Ak, KP (2015). "The Journal of a Voyage to Lisbon". The Republic of Letters.
- Darlington, André (2014). Memoir:Revisiting the Journal of a Voyage to Lisbon by Henry Fielding (1707-1754). Travel.
- Gooding, Richard (2007). "A complication Disorder: Body Health, Masculility and the Discourse of Gout and Dropsy in Henry Fileding's The Journal of a Voyage to Lisbon". Literature and Medicine. 26 (2): 386–407. doi:10.1353/lm.0.0001.
- Bernard, Nathalie (2008). "Entre subversion et nostalgie : l'intertextualité grecque et latine dans The Journal of a Voyage to Lisbon de Henry Filding". Revue de la société d'études anglo-américaines des XVIIe et XVIIIe siècles (60): 187–200.
- Bowers, Terence (1995). "Tropes of Nationhood: Body, Body Politic, and Nation-State in Fielding's Journal of a Voyage to Lisbon". ELH. 62 (3): 575–602. doi:10.1353/elh.1995.0022.
- Burling, William J. (1989). "Merit Infinitely Short of Service: Fielding's Pleas in Journal of a Voyage to Lisbon". English Studies. 70 (70): 53–62. doi:10.1080/00138388908598614.
- Bernard, Nathalie (2005). "Entre subversion et nostalgie : l'intertextualité grecque et latine dans The Journal of a Voyage to Lisbon », XVII XVIII" (PDF). Revue de la société d'études anglo-américaines des XVIIe et XVIIIe siècles (60): 187–200. doi:10.3406/xvii.2005.2027.
- Meier, T. K. (1980). "Fielding's Voyage to Lisbon: Outrage as Art". Neuphilogische Mitteilungen (81): 424–427.
- Rabb, Melinda Alliker (1984). "Confinement ans Entrapment in Henrry Fielding's Journal of a Voyage to Lisbon". Studies in the Literary Imagination (17): 75–89.
- Rivero, Albert J. (1994). "Figurations of the Dying: Reading Fielding's The Journal of a Voyage to Lisbon". Journal of English and Germanic Philology (93): 520–533.
- Wilmer, Arlene (1980). "History as Private Perspective: Fielding's Journal of a Voyage to Lisbon". Modern Language Studies (10): 26–36. doi:10.2307/3194241. JSTOR 3194241.
- Warren, Leland E. (1982). "This Intrepid and Gallant Spirit: Henry Fielding' Sentimental Satiric Voyage". Essays in Literature (9): 43–54.

== See also ==
- The Universal Gallant
- The Temple Beau
- The Historical Register for the Year 1736
