= Christopher Pegge =

English physician

Sir Christopher Pegge M.D. (1765–1822) was an English medical doctor.

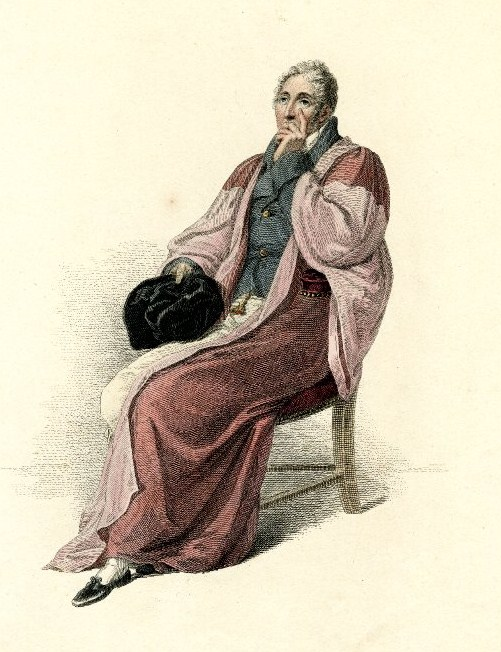
Christopher Pegge

== Life ==
The son of Samuel Pegge the younger, by his first wife, he was born in London. He entered Christ Church, Oxford, as a commoner on 18 April 1782, and graduated B.A. on 23 February 1786. He was elected a Fellow of Oriel College in 1788, and graduated M.A. and M.B. there on 10 June and 18 July 1789. He returned to Christ Church, was appointed Lee's reader in anatomy there in 1790, and proceeded M.D. on 27 April 1792.

On 9 November 1790, Pegge became physician to the Radcliffe Infirmary, and a Fellow of the Royal Society in 1795. He was knighted on 26 June 1799, and was appointed regius professor of physic at Oxford in 1801. He was elected a fellow of the Royal College of Physicians on 25 June 1796, delivered the Harveian oration in 1805, and became a censor in 1817.

Pegge left Oxford in 1816, and took a house in George Street, Hanover Square, for his health. Soon afterwards he moved on to Hastings. He had resigned his readership in 1816, but retained the regius professorship. He attended in the university, in accordance with the statutes, and died in Oxford, after an asthmatic seizure, on 3 August 1822. He was master of Ewelme Hospital, and was buried in Ewelme church, where he had an epitaph in the south aisle.

== Notes ==
Attribution

This article incorporates text from a publication now in the public domain: Lee, Sidney, ed. (1895). "Pegge, Christopher". Dictionary of National Biography. Vol. 44. London: Smith, Elder & Co.
