= Henry Christmas =

English clergyman, writer, editor and numismatist

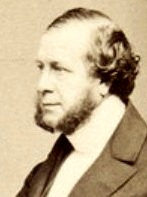
Henry Christmas

Henry Christmas (1811 – 10 March 1868), at the end of his life going by the surname Noel-Fearn, was an English clergyman, a man of letters and editor of periodicals, known also as a numismatist.

== Life ==
Born in London in 1811, he was the only son of Robert Noble Christmas of Taunton, by Jane, daughter of Samuel Fearn. He was educated at St John's College, Cambridge, and graduated B.A. in 1837, M.A. 1840. He was ordained in 1837, and after serving several curacies was in 1841 appointed librarian and secretary of Sion College, holding the office till 1848.

From 1840 to 1843 and from 1854 to 1858 Christmas edited the Church of England Quarterly Review. He also edited The Churchman (1840–3), the British Churchman (1845–8), and the Literary Gazette (1859–60). He was for some years lecturer at St Peter's Church, Cornhill, and later filled the curacy of Garlickhithe. He was also for some time Sunday evening preacher at St. Mildred's in the Poultry.

Christmas was a versatile scholar: he was a Fellow of the Royal Society, and of the Society of Antiquaries of London, a member of the Royal Academy of History at Madrid, and (in 1854–9) professor of English history and archæology in the Royal Society of Literature (England). He died in London suddenly, from apoplexy, on 11 March 1868, aged 57, and was buried in Norwood cemetery. Shortly before his death he had assumed the name of Noel-Fearn. He married, in 1838, Eliza Fox, by whom he had one son and three daughters.

== Works ==
Christmas's works included:

- The Voyage: a poem, London, 1833.
- Universal Mythology; an account of the most important systems, London, 1838.
- Capital Punishments unsanctioned by the Gospel, and unnecessary to a Christian State, a letter, London, 1845, (26,000 copies are said to have been sold).
- A Concise History of the Hampden Controversy, … with all the documents that have been published, London, 1848.
- The World of Matter and its Testimony; an attempt to exhibit the connection between Natural Philosophy and Revealed Religion, London, 1848.
- The Cradle of the Twin Giants, Science and History, 2 vols. London, 1849.
- Echoes of the Universe: from the World of Matter and the World of Spirit, London, 1850 (seventh edition published in 1863, two editions in America).
- The Shores and Islands of the Mediterranean, including a visit to the Seven Churches of Asia, 3 vols. London, 1851.
- Scenes in the Life of Christ (Lectures), 2nd edit. London.
- Memoir of Nicholas I, Emperor of Russia, in Shaw's Family Library (1854), and memoir of the Sultan Abdul Medjid in the same library.
- The State and Prospects of Turkey and Mohammedanism, a lecture, 1854.
- Christian Politics: an Essay on the Text of Paley, 1855.
- A Letter on the … Society of Antiquaries, London, 1855.
- A Brief Memoir of … Napoleon III, London, 1855.
- Preachers and Preaching, London, 1858.
- The Hand of God in India (lectures), London, 1858.
- The Christmas Week: a Christmas Story, Edinburgh, 1859.
- Sin, its Causes and Consequences (Lent lectures), London, 1861.

Christmas translated Augustin Calmet's Phantom World (1850), Christoph Martin Wieland's Republic of Fools (1861), and other writings. He edited works including Samuel Pegge's Anecdotes of the English Language (1844), the Works of Bishop Ridley (1841), and the Select Works of Bishop Bale (1849), the last two for the Parker Society.

=== Numismatics ===
Christmas collected British, Saxon, and English silver and copper coins, and also specimens of the Scotch, Irish, and Anglo-Gallic series. From June 1844 till 1847 he acted as joint honorary secretary of the Numismatic Society of London, and madecontributions to the Numismatic Chronicle (Old Series). He also compiled part of a work on British copper currencies: a few copies were printed in 1864, but were never published. Portions of the text and the wood-blocks of coins prepared for Christmas's work were by H. Montagu in Copper, Tin, and Bronze Coinage of England (1885). His collection was sold by auction at Sotheby's from 1 February 1864.
