= Mary Mollineux =

Mary Mollineux (born Mary Southworth, 1651–1696) was a Quaker poet who differed from many of her Quaker contemporaries because of an early education in Latin, Greek, science, and arithmetic. Probably the daughter of Catholic parents who converted to Quakerism, she met her husband Henry Mollineux (died 1719), who wrote Quaker tracts, while they were both imprisoned in Lancaster Castle in 1684 for attending Quaker meetings. Her husband was imprisoned again in 1690 for refusing to pay tythes to the Church of England and Mary petitioned for his release.

== Works ==
The Fruits of Retirement (1702) was posthumously published. The book is a compilation of Mollineux's manuscript poetry put together by her cousin Frances Owen and printed by the female Quaker publisher Tace Sowle. It went through six editions in the 18th century.

The poems blend erudition with activism and also develop literary constructions about exile, retreat, and retirement more typical of Katherine Philips and (later) Anne Finch than of Quaker polemicists. Owen was inspired to collect them, he said, because they would work in service of Quakerism. They are largely biblical in inspiration, but there are hints of her classical education therein, particularly in her composition of Latin elegiac couplets. The first, 'The Fall of Man', is dated 1663. 'A Meditation' (1668), for example, expands on verses from the Book of Lamentations to draw a comparison with the dire situation of Dissenters at that time.

== Bibliography ==
- Achinstein, Sharon, Literature and Dissent in Milton's England (Cambridge: Cambridge University Press, 2003).
- ---, "Romance of the Spirit: Female Sexuality and Religious Desire in Early Modern England," ELH 69.2 (2002): 413-438.
- Donoghue, Emma (ed.), Poems between Women: Four Centuries of Love, Romantic Friendship, and Desire (New York: Columbia University Press, 1997).
- Ezell, Margaret J.M., Social Authorship and the Advent of Print (Baltimore and London: The Johns Hopkins University Press, 1999).
- ---, Writing Women's Literary History (Baltimore and London: The Johns Hopkins University Press, 1993).
- Schofield, Mary Anne. Women's Speaking Justified': The Feminine Quaker Voice, 1662-1797, Tulsa Studies in Women’s Literature 6.1 (Spring 1987): 61-77.
- Stevenson, Jane and Peter Davidson (eds), Early Modern Women Poets (1520-1700): An Anthology (Oxford: Oxford University Press).
- Stevenson, Jane, Women Latin Poets: Language, Gender, and Authority, from Antiquity to the Eighteenth-Century (Oxford: Oxford University Press, 2005).
