= Gerard Croese =

Dutch Reformed minister and author

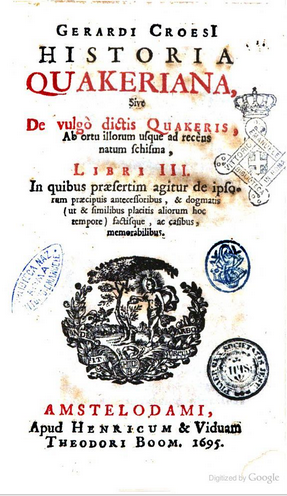
Historia Quakeriana, title page

Gerard Croese (26 April 1642, Amsterdam – 10 May 1710, Dordrecht) was a Dutch Reformed minister and author. He is now remembered as an early historian of the Society of Friends, with his Historia Quakeriana (1695). It is considered sympathetic, in general terms, but neither uncritical nor entirely reliable.

== Life ==
Croese was born in Amsterdam. He studied at Leiden University, under Johann Friedrich Gronovius, Georgius Hornius, Johannes Cocceius and Johannes Hoornbeek. After university he spent time in Smyrna, and visited England. He settled as a minister at Alblas, near Dordrecht.
