= Matthew Green (poet) =

British poet

Matthew Green (1696–1737) was a British poet born of Nonconformist parents. For many years he held a post in the custom house. The few anecdotes that have been preserved show him to have been as witty as his poems would lead one to expect: on one occasion, when the government was about to cut off funds that paid for milk for the custom house cats, Green submitted a petition in their name, winning a reprieve. He died unmarried at his lodging in Nag's Head Court, Gracechurch Street, London, in 1737.

His Grotto, a poem on Queen Caroline's grotto at Richmond was printed in 1732; and his chief poem, The Spleen, in 1737 with a preface by his friend Richard Glover. These and some other short poems were printed in Robert Dodsley's collection (1748), and subsequently in various editions of the British poets. They were edited in 1796 with a preface by John Aikin and in 1854 by Robert Aris Willmott with the poems of Thomas Gray and others. The Spleen, which was not originally intended for publication, is an epistle to Cuthbert Jackson, advocating cheerfulness, exercise and a quiet content as remedies. It is full of witty sayings. Thomas Gray said of it: "There is a profusion of wit everywhere; reading would have formed his judgment, and harmonized his verse, for even his wood-notes often break out into strains of real poetry and music". Despite this praise, Green is thought of as a "one-poem" poet, to the point that he became known as "Spleen-Green."

In an age of orthodoxy, Green had an original turn of mind. His idiosyncratic conversation 'occasioned one of the commissioners of the Customs, a very dull man, to observe that he did not know how it was, but Green always expressed himself in a different manner from other people'.

Green is perhaps best remembered (if at all) for witty aphorisms, such as:

- "By happy alchemy of mind / They turn to pleasure all they find."
- "Laugh and be well."
- "Fling but a stone, the giant dies." (The Spleen)
- "Though pleased to see the dolphins play / I mind my compass and my way." (The Spleen)
