= Samuel Pegge (the younger) =

British writer and composer (1733–1800)

- The Pegge coat of Arms. The Pegge family are originally from Shirley, Ashbourne. A distant relative is Catherine Pegge, a mistress of Charles II of England.
- Born: 1733
- Died: 22 May 1800 (aged 66 or 67)
- Occupation: Aniquarian
- Spouse(s): Martha Bourne and Goodeth Belt
- Children: Sir Christopher Pegge and Charlotte Anne
- Parent: Samuel Pegge the elder

Samuel Pegge - the younger (1733 – 22 May 1800) was an antiquary, poet, musical composer and lexicographer. He was the son of Samuel Pegge and their work is frequently intertwined. He was the only surviving son of Samuel and his wife Anne, daughter of Benjamin Clarke, esq., of Stanley, near Wakefield, Yorkshire.

After receiving a classical education at St. John's College, Cambridge, he was called to the bar at the Middle Temple, and by the favour of the Duke of Devonshire, lord chamberlain, he was appointed one of the Grooms of the Privy Chamber and an Esquire of the king's household. On 2 June 1796 he was elected a fellow of the Society of Antiquaries. After his death, he was buried on the west side of Kensington churchyard, where a monument was erected to his memory.

== Music ==
Pegge acquired a considerable proficiency in music at an early age. He composed a complete melodrama both the words and the music in score. Many catches and glees, and several of the most popular songs for Vauxhall Gardens were written and set to music by him. He was also the author of some prologues and epilogues which were popular including a prologue spoken by Mr. Yates at Birmingham in 1760. He also wrote an epilogue spoken by the same actor at Drury Lane on his return from France; and another epilogue, filled with pertinent allusions to the game of quadrille, spoken by Mrs. Yates at her benefit in 1769, 1770 and 1774. He was likewise the author of a pathetic elegy on his own recovery from a dangerous illness, and of some pleasant tales and epigrammatic poems.

== Family ==
By his first wife, Martha, daughter of Dr. Henry Bourne, an eminent physician of Chesterfield, he had one son, Sir Christopher Pegge, M.D. (1764 – 22 May 1822), and a daughter, Charlotte Anne, who died unmarried on 17 March 1793. He married, secondly, Goodeth Belt, aunt to Robert Belt, esq., of Bossall, Yorkshire.

His son, Christopher, was a well known doctor in Oxford and also delivered lectures in mineralogy at Oxford University, and in 1800, the university purchased a cabinet of minerals from him which was to be part of the establishment of that subject at the university.

Christopher Pegge, together with Wall and Bourne was one of the three most important doctors in Oxford in the early nineteenth century. quotes the following rhyme about them, entitled The Oxford medical trio:

I would not call in any one of them all,
For only "the weakest will go to the Wall";
The second, like Death, that scythe-armed mower,
Will speedily make you a peg or two lower;
While the third, with the fees he so silently earns,
Is "the bourn whence no traveller ever returns".

Another rhyme, about Sir Christopher Pegge, went:

Like Circe Sir C. can prescribe a mixt cup,
But mixtures Circeian beware to drink up

== Samuel Pegge's major works ==
1. An Elegy on the Death of Godfrey Bagnall Clerke, M.P. for Derbyshire, who died on 26 Dec. 1774, printed at Chesterfield
2. "Brief Memoirs of Edward Capell, Esq.", 1790, in John Nichols's Literary Anecdotes (i. 465–76)
3. Curialia; or an Historical Account of some Branches of the Royal Household, 5 parts, London, 1782–1806.
  Parts 1–3 (1782); Parts IV & V (1803), edited after Pegge's death by Nichols
4. "Illustrations of the Churchwardens' Accompts of St Michael Spurrier-Gate, York", in Illustrations of the Manners and Expences of Ancient Times (1797)
5. "Memoir of his father, Dr Samuel Pegge", in Nichols's Literary Anecdotes (i. 224–58)
6. Anecdotes of the English Language; chiefly regarding the Local Dialect of London and its Environs, edited by John Nichols, London, 1803; 2nd edit., enlarged, "to which is added a Supplement to the Provincial Glossary of Francis Grose", edited by Nichols, London, 1814; 3rd edit., enlarged and corrected, edited by Henry Christmas, London, 1844
7. Curialia Miscellanea; or Anecdotes of Old Times, regal, noble, gentilitian, and miscellaneous, including Authentic Anecdotes of the Royal Household, edited by Nichols, London, 1818
