= Jane Fearon =

Jane Fearon (née Hall, 1654 or 1656–1737) was an English Quaker pamphleteer born in Great Broughton, Cumberland. Having had "a godly education", she became a Quaker minister in about 1688. She preached on the Isle of Man, incurring a prison sentence for doing so, and in various parts of Britain.

== Family ==
Jane Hall married Peter Fearon in 1693 and had two sons by him, Isaac (born 1694) and Jacob (born 1696), but she continued to travel as a preacher.

== Hell and predestination ==
All Fearon's known written works are concerned with the argument that nobody is predestined to go to Hell. The first was Universal Redemption Offered in Jesus Christ: in Opposition to that Pernicious and Destructive Doctrine of Election and Reprobation of Persons from Everlasting (1693), from which it emerges that she believed in Hell, but not "that from Eternity, God did predestine or fore-ordain" any person to go there.

An encounter with Independent preachers declaring the opposite led Fearon to write her work Absolute Predestination not Scriptural: or Some Queries upon a Doctrine which I heard Preach'd, 1704. to a people call'd Independents, at Cockermouth in Cumberland. This appeared in 1705. It sets out to answer 48 queries about Bible passages to show that the choice of salvation lies within ourselves. A pamphlet retorting to this prompted her to release A Reply to John Atkinson's Pretended Answer to Absolute Predestination not Scriptural in 1709. This was to become her most widely read publication.

Jane Fearon died on 18 September 1737.

== Aftermath ==
Several of Fearon's 22 works continued to be reprinted and adapted into the 1810s. An adventure story ostensibly featuring Jane Fearon and entitled "Murder Prevented by the Interposition of Providence", appeared in The Literary Magnet (London, 1829).

== Works ==
- Universal Redemption Offered in Jesus Christ: in Opposition to that Pernicious and Destructive Doctrine of Election and Reprobation of Persons from Everlasting, 1693
- Absolute Predestination not Scriptural: or, Some Questions upon a Doctrine which I Heard Preach'd, 1704, to a People call'd Independents, at Cockermouth in Cumberland, London, 1705. Reprinted as A Plain Refutation of that false and injurious doctrine, so prevalent in the world, which presents God as the author of all sin, or that He hath decreed from all eternity whatsoever comes to pass. Written by way of queries, on Scripture passages, in 1704. By Jane Fearon, Concord, New Hampshire, 1813.
- Reply to John Atkinson's Pretended Answer to Absolute Predestination Not Scriptural, 1709
