= The Historical Register for the Year 1736 =

18th century English play by Henry Fielding

The Historical Register for the Year 1736 is a 1737 play by Henry Fielding. A denunciation of contemporary society and politics, most notably prime minister Sir Robert Walpole, it was performed for the first time in April 1737 and published shortly thereafter by J. Roberts in London according to the book's title page (but actually W. Cheyne in Edinburgh).

In satirizing contemporary politicians, "good" society and the more influential figures of the London theatre of the time, The Historical Register for the year 1736 is responsible, in more than one way, for his having been censored from the stage.

The play gives a critical survey of English manners and morals, it exposes the corruption of political life and the false values of the beau monde. It also satirizes some influential figures of the London theatre of its time.

It was owing to such satires that Prime Minister Robert Walpole's government in 1737 introduced a Licensing Act for the theatre, which put drama under the direct control of the Lord Chamberlain (a law which was not changed until 1968). This censorship has been blamed for the decline of drama in the 18th century. It also brought Fielding's career in the theatre to an end.

== Plot summary ==
The Historical Register for the Year 1736 and Eurydice Hissed (both were published together in 1737) are two of Henry Fielding's satirical dramas. A mixture of several plots, each play extensively satirizes British politicians.

In form, the play is a series of unrelated episodes, given a coherence by a rehearsal framework: An author, Medley, presents his play to the "critic", Sourwit and Lord Dapper, two characteristic figures of London high society. Medley, who can be regarded as Fielding's spokesman, explains: "... my design is to ridicule the vicious and foolish customs of the age, and that in a fair manner, without fear, favour or ill nature, and without scurrility, ill manners, or commonplace. I hope to expose the reigning follies in such a manner that men shall laugh themselves out of them before they feel that they are touched."

The original text involves "a humming deal of satire" and farce, referring exclusively to the year 1736.

== Impact ==
The Licensing Act 1737 modified the laws against the unpredictability of playwrights. The act attempted to eliminate the illegitimate theatres and also to expurgate insurgent works that were previously creeping their way into the Patent theatres. The law required all licensed theaters to submit the texts of their plays to the Lord Chamberlain for censorship prior to the performance, thus allowing him to filter out any subversive material contained in the texts and thus deny to the public the performance of any play that he felt was distasteful.

Remarkably, the Licensing Act 1737 withstood over a hundred years of effectiveness, as it was subsequently used as a model for the legislation of censorship by modern Western States. Not until 1968, was the act fully revoked. Herein lies the argument of the powerful effects of the Licensing Act and the damage it caused to drama and theatre in the years following its birth.

As a result, theatrical writers began developing a comedy of sentiment, which was typically labeled "high comedy." This type of comedy contained less actual humor than it did mere entertainment by inspiring emotional responses from the audience. The plot directing this sort of comedy found it necessary to stage characters that were in or out of compassion with one another. However, true forms of comedy, marked by absurdly harsh realities, ugly truths, and downright sarcastic, yet honest humor was driven from the stage after the Licensing Act 1737. The plays became more sentimental and domestically oriented. Experimental forms were deprived because of the political interference with the theatre at that time. Prospective works of theatrical geniuses were left unfulfilled, and their brilliance left in the dust, overshadowed by dominating political figures. Ultimately, writers and poets that were forced from the stage due to censoring laws, found a new outlet in the form of the novel. Popular authors like Richardson, Fielding, and Defoe found success with this rising literary form, conveying messages which had previously only reached the ears of the London theatre audiences. Ironically, the Licensing Act ended up increasing the power of rebellious authors as it put a stop to anti-ministry arguments on the stage and sent their powerful messages through the form of the novel.

== See also ==
The Journal of a Voyage to Lisbon
