= 2010 in literature =

This article contains information about the literary events and publications of 2010.

== Events ==
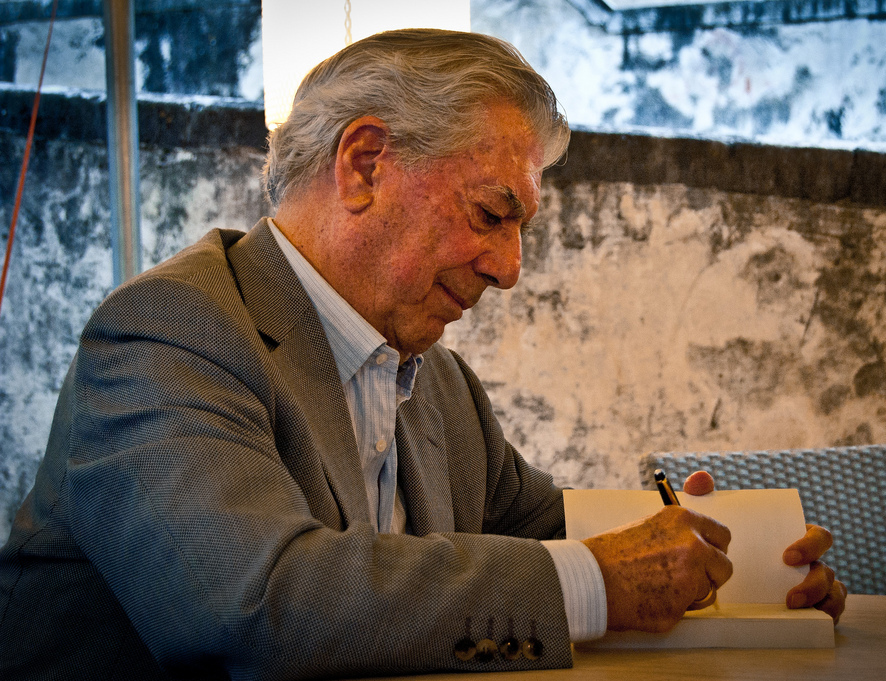
Mario Vargas Llosa in 2010

- February – The Wheeler Centre, Australia's "literary hub", is officially opened.
- April 3 – The Apple iPad electronic book-reading device is released.
- April 12 – The little-known U.S. author Paul Harding wins the Pulitzer Prize for Fiction for his debut novel Tinkers (2009) published by the tiny Bellevue Literary Press.
- June 24 – Neil Gaiman becomes the first author to win both the Carnegie Medal and the Newbery Medal for the same book — The Graveyard Book.
- July 27 – Stieg Larsson's Millennium Trilogy becomes an international sensation, with a total of 27 million copies sold worldwide as of May 2010. On July 27 Amazon says that Larsson is the first author to sell more than 1 million Kindle e-books.
- August 13 – Time magazine puts Jonathan Franzen on its cover for his novel Freedom, the first time an author has appeared there since 2000 with Stephen King.
- October 7 – The 2010 Nobel Prize in Literature is awarded to Mario Vargas Llosa for "his cartography of structures of power and his trenchant images of the individual's resistance, revolt, and defeat".
- October 12 – Howard Jacobson wins the Man Booker Prize for The Finkler Question
- November 9 – Johanna Skibsrud wins the Scotiabank Giller Prize for her novel The Sentimentalists.
- November 16 – The 2010 Governor General's Awards are announced. Winners include Dianne Warren for English fiction, Kim Thúy for French fiction, Richard Greene for poetry and Robert Chafe for drama.
- November – Mark Twain's Autobiography is published (officially) 100 years after the author's death, the delay Twain ordered himself. Unofficial copies have been published several times in the 20th century.
- December 31 – Book censorship in the Republic of Ireland by the state temporarily ends, the 12-year limit on the most recent ban having expired. However, the law remains on the statute book and is later used again.
- unknown date – Orlando Figes posts pseudonymous reviews on the UK site of bookseller Amazon.com criticising books by two other British historians of Russia, Robert Service and Rachel Polonsky, whilst praising his own books among others.

== New books ==
=== Fiction ===
- Jokha al-Harthi – Sayidat al-Qamar (Ladies of the Moon, translated as Celestial Bodies)
- Martin Amis – The Pregnant Widow (February 4)
- Paul Auster – Sunset Park (November 9)
- Paolo Bacigalupi – Ship Breaker (May 1)
- Brunonia Barry – The Map of True Places
- Robert Jackson Bennett – Mr. Shivers
- Peter Carey – Parrot and Olivier in America (April 20)
- Eddie Chuculate – Cheyenne Madonna (June 20)
- Ron Cooper – Purple Jesus
- Michael Cunningham – By Nightfall (September 28)
- Don DeLillo – Point Omega (February 2)
- Jennifer Egan – A Visit from the Goon Squad (June 15)
- Bret Easton Ellis – Imperial Bedrooms (June 15)
- Joshua Ferris – The Unnamed (January 18)
- Aminatta Forna – The Memory of Love
- Jonathan Franzen – Freedom (August 31)
- Cornelia Funke – Reckless
- Matthew Gallaway – The Metropolis Case (November 8)
- Seth Grahame-Smith – Abraham Lincoln, Vampire Hunter
- Sara Gruen – Ape House (September 7)
- Margaret Peterson Haddix – Into the Gauntlet (August 31)
- Kristin Hannah – Winter Garden (February 2)
- Michel Houellebecq – The Map and the Territory (La Carte et le territoire, September 4)
- Rabee Jaber – دروز بلغراد (Duruz Bilghrad: Hikayat Hanna Yaqub, The Druze of Belgrade: the history of Hanna Yaqub)
- Howard Jacobson – The Finkler Question (October 12)
- Anjali Joseph – Saraswati Park (July 8)
- Stacey Kade – The Ghost and The Goth (July 6)
- Philip Kerr – Field Grey
- Stephen King
  - Blockade Billy (April 20)
  - Full Dark, No Stars (November 9)
- Nicole Krauss – Great House (October 12)
- John le Carré – Our Kind of Traitor (October 12)
- Dennis Lehane – Moonlight Mile (November 2)
- Tao Lin – Richard Yates (September 7)
- Ian McEwan – Solar (March 30)
- Jon McGregor – Even the Dogs
- Yann Martel – Beatrice and Virgil (April 6)
- Maaza Mengiste – Beneath the Lion's Gaze (January)
- Davud Michie - The Magician of Lhasa
- David Mitchell – The Thousand Autumns of Jacob de Zoet (June 29)
- Martin Mosebach – What Was Before
- Anirban Mukherjee – Love, A Rather Bad Idea
- Ben Myers – Richard: A Novel (October 1)
- Chuck Palahniuk – Tell All (May 4)
- Philip Pullman – The Good Man Jesus and the Scoundrel Christ (May 20)
- Lincoln Peirce – Big Nate: In a Class by Himself (March 23)
- Philip Roth – Nemesis (October 5)
- Amy Sackville – The Still Point (February 4)
- Ashwin Sanghi – Chanakya's Chant
- David Sedaris – Squirrel Seeks Chipmunk: A Modest Bestiary (September 28)
- Sarah Selecky – This Cake Is for the Party
- Lola Shoneyin – The Secret Lives of Baba Segi's Wives (May)
- Gary Shteyngart – Super Sad True Love Story (July 27)
- Kim Thúy – Ru
- Mario Vargas Llosa – The Dream of the Celt (El sueño del celta) (November 3)
- Donald E. Westlake – Memory (April)

=== Children and young people ===
- David Almond
  - The Boy Who Climbed Into the Moon
  - My Name is Mina
  - Slog's Dad
- Swati Avasthi – Split
- Chelsea M. Campbell – The Rise of Renegade X
- Suzanne Collins – Mockingjay (August 24)
- Diane Duane – A Wizard of Mars (April 12)
- John Flanagan – The Emperor of Nihon-Ja (November 2010)
- Eva Ibbotson (died October 20) – One Dog and his Boy
- Matthew J. Kirby – The Clockwork Three (October 1)
- Gordon Korman – Framed
- Stephen Krensky – Mother's Day Surprise
- Laura Leiner
  - Szent Johanna gimi 1 – Kezdet (Start, first in the St. Joan High School series of seven books)
  - Szent Johanna gimi 2 – Együtt (Together)
  - Szent Johanna gimi 3 – Egyedül (Alone)
- Wendy Mass – The Candymakers
- Pat Miller – Squirrel's New Year's Resolution
- Robert Muchamore – Brigands M. C. (May 6)
- Jim Murphy – THE CROSSING: How George Washington Saved the American Revolution
- Garth Nix – Lord Sunday (February)
- James Patterson – Fang: A Maximum Ride Novel (March 15)
- Jerry Pinkney (adaption) – Three Little Kittens
- Philip Reeve – A Web of Air (April 5)
- Rick Riordan
  - The Lost Hero (October 12)
  - The Red Pyramid
- Salman Rushdie – Luka and the Fire of Life (November 16)
- Clare Vanderpool – Moon Over Manifest (October 12)
- Charlotte Voake – Ginger and the Mystery Visitor
- Kiersten White – Paranormalcy (August 31)
- N.D. Wilson – The Chestnut King

=== Science fiction and fantasy ===
- Jim Butcher – Changes (April 6)
- Amish Tripathi – The Immortals of Meluha (February)

=== Drama ===
- Peter Handke – Storm Still
- Sabrina Mahfouz – That Boy
- Bruce Norris – Clybourne Park
- Nina Raine – Tribes
- Christoph Ransmayr – Odysseus, Verbrecher
- Anya Reiss – Spur of the Moment
- Alexis Stamatis – Dakrygona (Tear Gas)
- Zlatko Topčić – I Don't Like Mondays
- Laura Wade – Posh
- David Williamson – Let the Sunshine

=== Non-fiction ===
- Linda Vero Ban – What Does It Mean To Be Jewish?
- William J. Bruce III - Penholder
- Bill Bryson – At Home: A Short History of Private Life (May 27)
- George W. Bush – Decision Points (November 9)
- Donovan Campbell – Joker One
- Hans Fredrik Dahl (ed.) – Norsk presses historie 1660–2010
- Paul Drexler – In Search of My Father
- Jay Feinman – Delay, Deny, Defend: Why Insurance Companies Don't Pay Claims and What You Can Do About It
- Sam Harris – The Moral Landscape: How Science Can Determine Human Values (October 5)
- Laura Hillenbrand – Unbroken: A World War II Story of Survival, Resilience, and Redemption (November 16)
- James Horn – A Kingdom Strange
- Joel Kotkin – The Next Hundred Million: America in 2050
- David Lipsky – Although of Course You End Up Becoming Yourself (April 13)
- Nursultan Nazarbayev – The Way of Kazakhstan (May 18)
- Sergio Rubin – El jesuita
- Nick Schuyler and Jere Longman – Not Without Hope (March 2)
- Niki Segnit – The Flavour Thesaurus: Pairings, Recipes and Ideas for the Creative Cook
- Jane Smiley – The Man Who Invented The Computer (December)
- Jon Stewart – Earth (The Book): A Visitor's Guide to the Human Race (September 21)
- Darin Strauss – Half a Life (September 21)
- Valerie Toranian – Pour en Finir avec la Femme (To Do Away with the Woman)
- Edmund de Waal – The Hare with Amber Eyes. A Hidden Inheritance
- John Leigh Walters – A Very Capable Life
- Alejandro Zambra – No Leer (Not to Read)

=== Poetry ===
- Stephen Sondheim – Finishing the Hat: Collected Lyrics (1954–1981) (October 26)

== Deaths ==
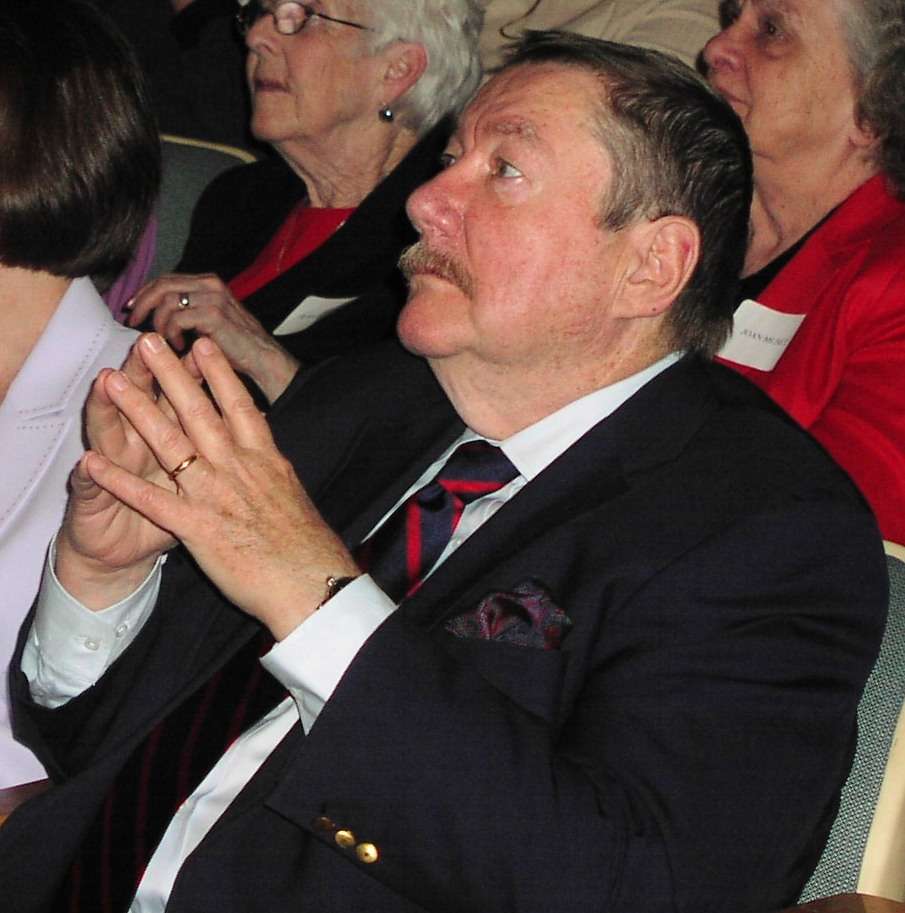
Robert B. Parker

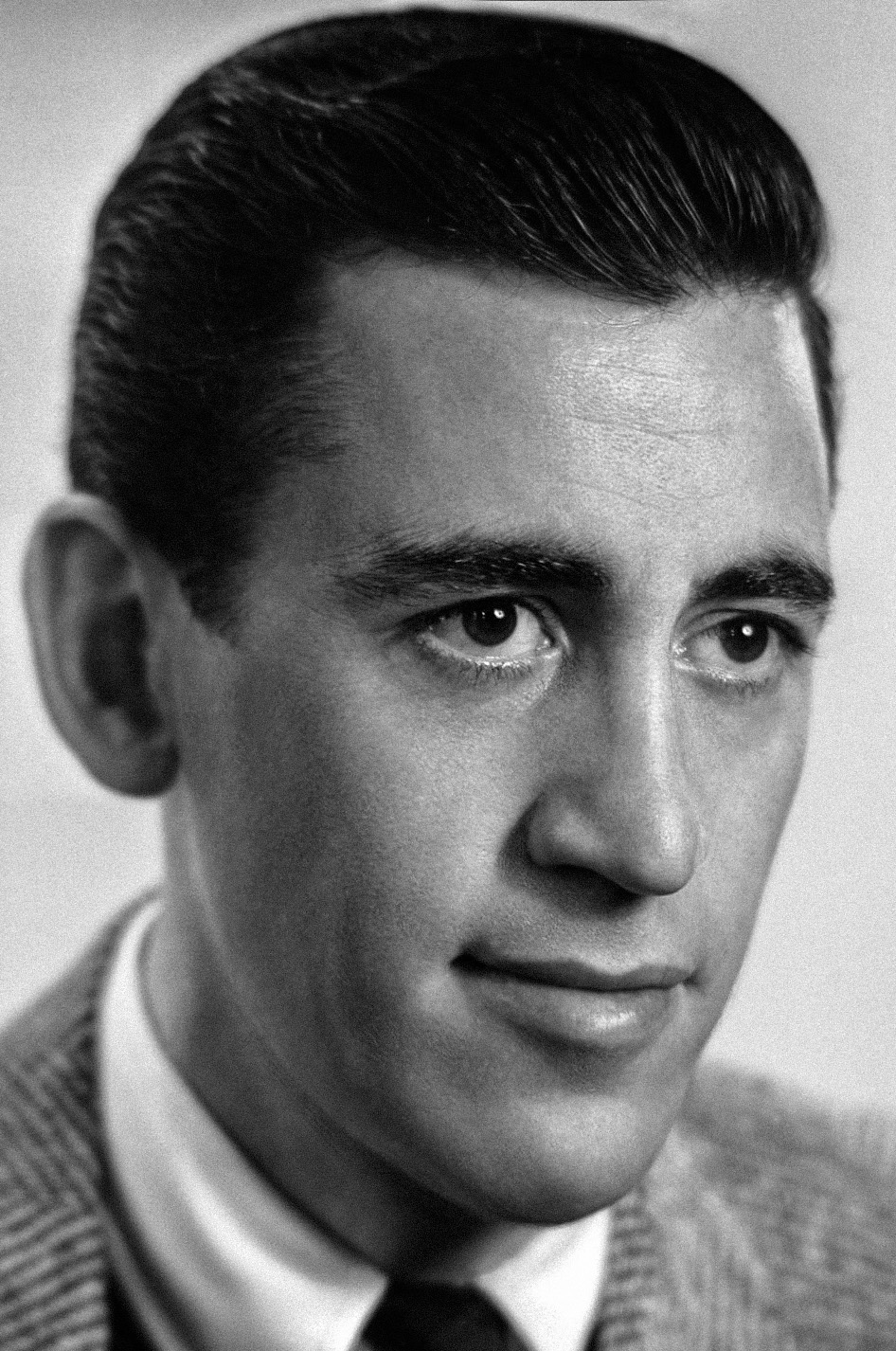
J. D. Salinger

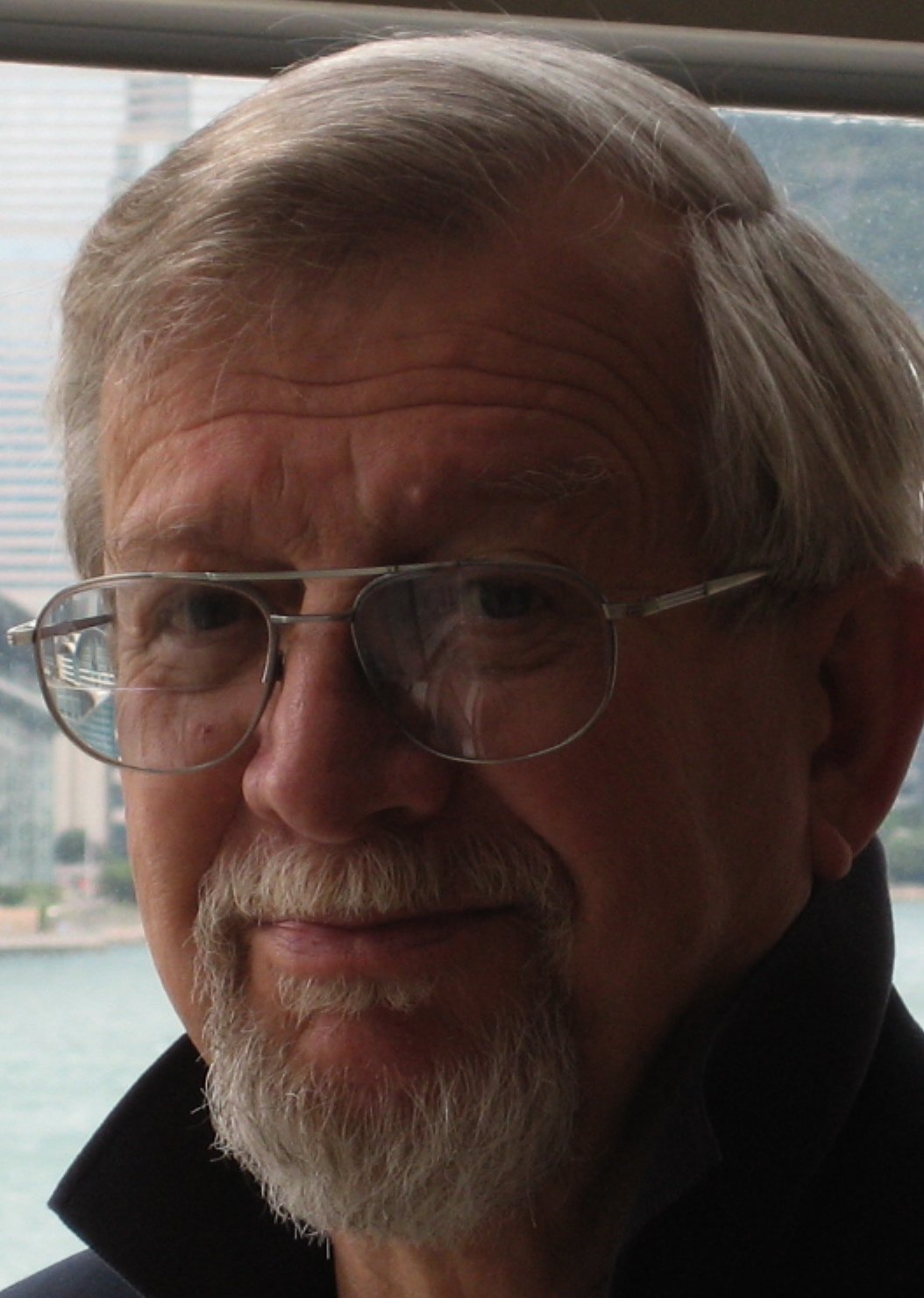
Robert Dana

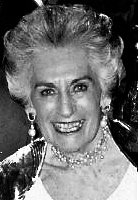
Susana Walton

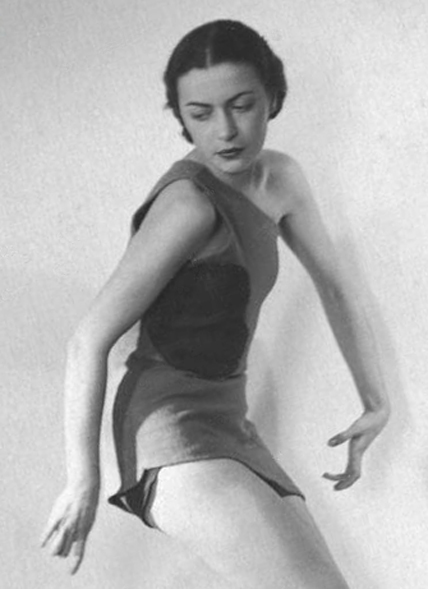
Stefania Grodzienska

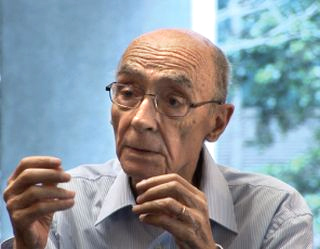
José Saramago

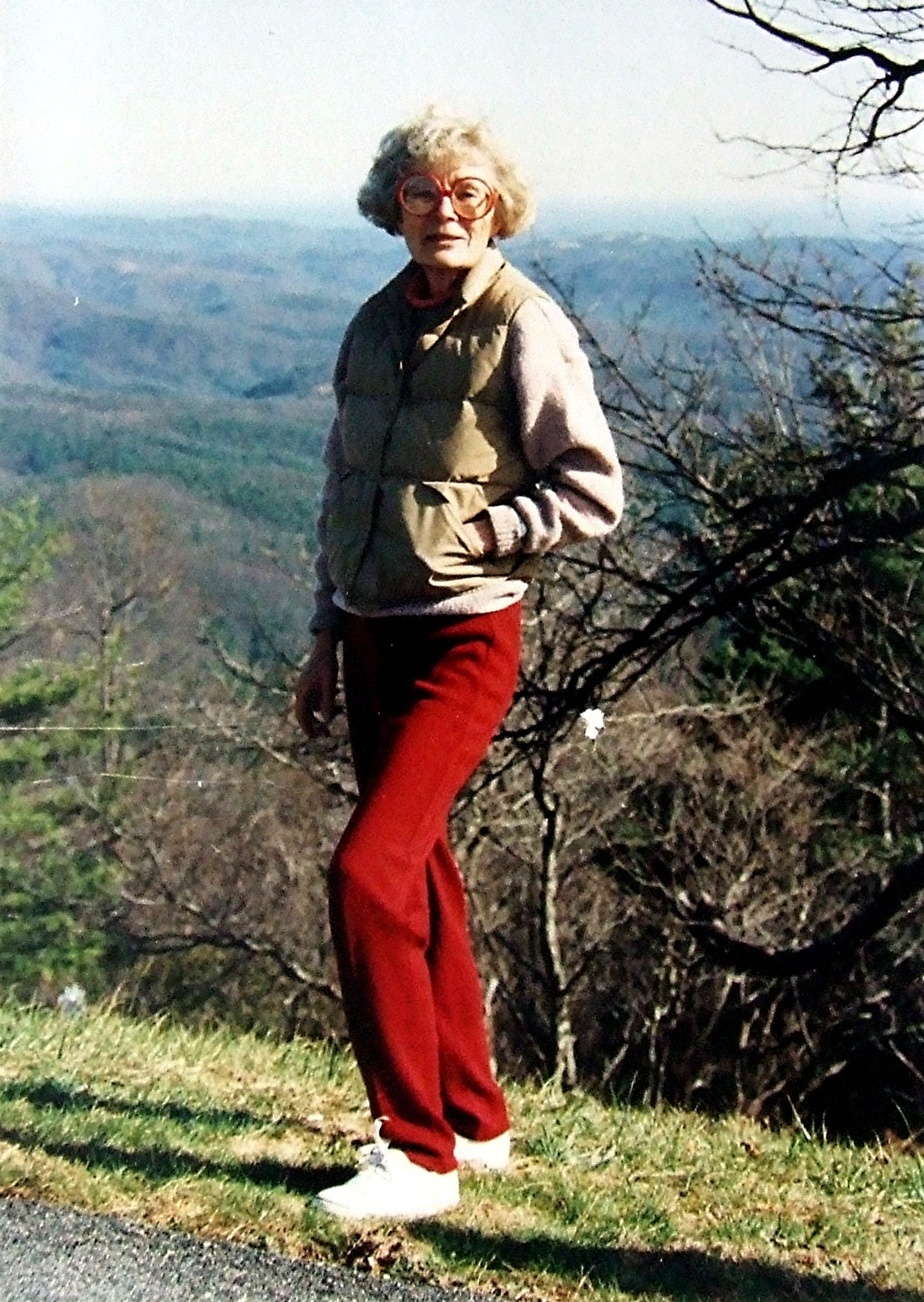
Barbara Holland

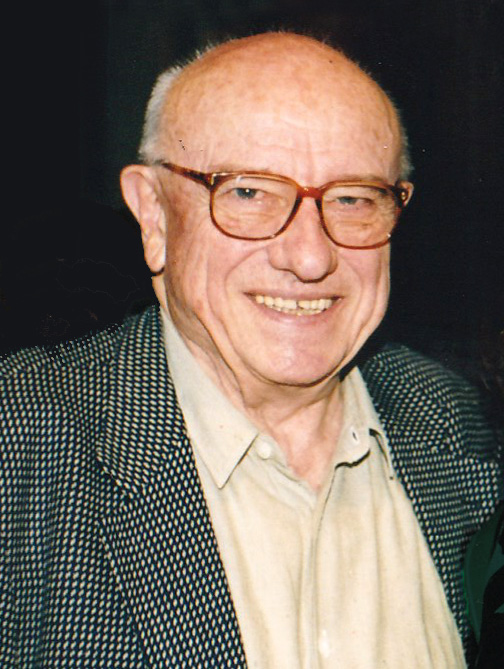
Bernard Clavel

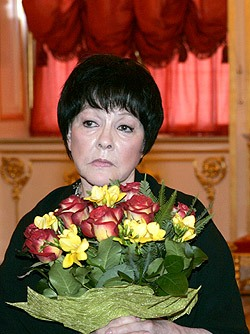
Bella Akhmadulina

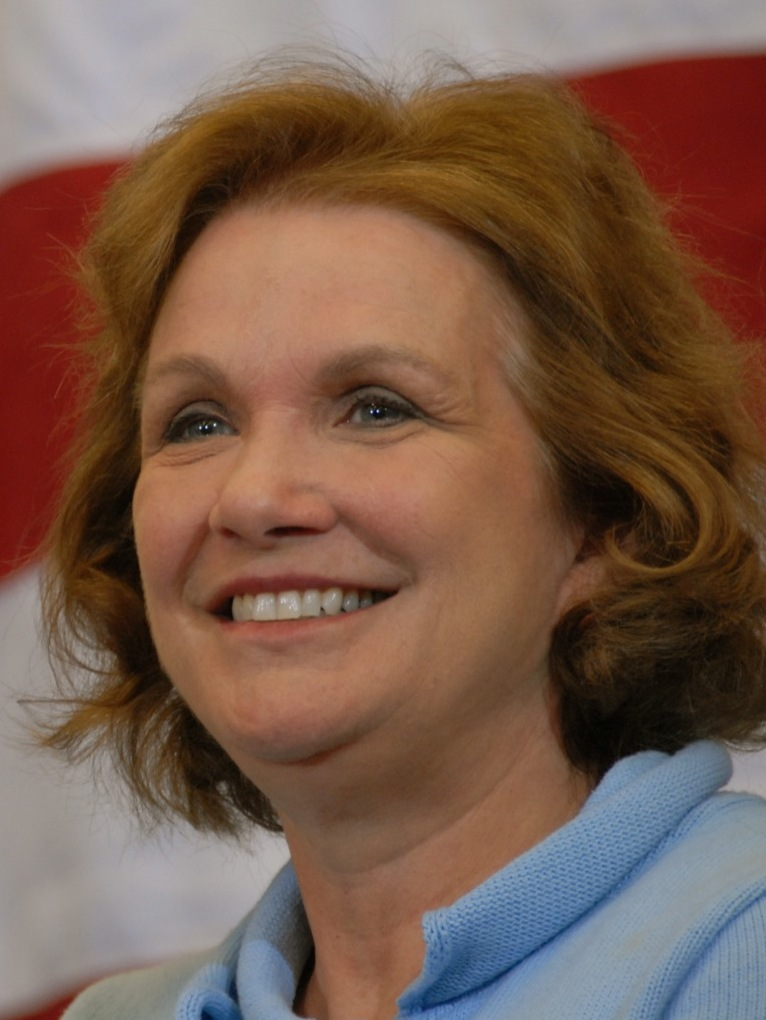
Elizabeth Edwards

- January 1
  - Bingo Gazingo, American performance poet (born 1924)
  - Billy Arjan Singh, Indian author (born 1917)
- January 2 – Rajendra Keshavlal Shah, Indian poet (born 1913)
- January 3
  - Mary Daly, American feminist philosopher and theologian (born 1928)
  - Isak Rogde, Norwegian translator (born 1947)
- January 4
  - Knox Burger, American editor, writer and agent (born 1922)
  - Hywel Teifi Edwards, Welsh historian and writer (born 1934)
- January 5 – Bernard Le Nail, French writer and historian (born 1946)
- January 6 – George Leonard, American writer and editor (born 1923)
- January 8
  - Tony Halme, Finnish athlete, politician, writer and entertainer (born 1963)
  - Slavka Maneva, Macedonian writer and poet (born 1934)
- January 9 – Laura Chapman Hruska, American writer and editor (born 1935)
- January 11 – Miep Gies, Austrian-born Dutch biographer (born 1909)
- January 14 – P. K. Page, Canadian poet (born 1916)
- January 16 – Takumi Shibano (柴野拓美), Japanese novelist (born 1926)
- January 17 – Erich Segal, American author and academic (born 1937)
- January 18 – Robert B. Parker, American detective writer (born 1932)
- January 19 – Vladimir Karpov, Soviet Russian writer (born 1922)
- January 20 – Abraham Sutzkever, Polish-born Israeli poet (born 1913)
- January 21 – Paul Quarrington, Canadian novelist (born 1953)
- January 26 – Louis Auchincloss, American novelist (born 1917)
- January 27
  - J. D. Salinger, American novelist (born 1919)
  - Howard Zinn, American historian (born 1922)
- January 31
  - Kage Baker, American science fiction and fantasy author (born 1952)
  - Tomás Eloy Martínez, Argentine writer (born 1934)
- February 2
  - Rosa Lobato de Faria, Portuguese writer (born 1932)
  - Eustace Mullins, American writer, author and biographer (born 1923)
- February 5 – Peter Calvocoressi, Pakistani-born English historian and publisher (born 1912)
- February 6 – Robert Dana, American poet (born 1929)
- February 7 – William Tenn (Philip Klass), American science fiction writer (born 1920)
- February 8 – Wahei Tatematsu (立松和平), Japanese novelist (born 1947)
- February 10 – H. V. F. Winstone, English biographer and journalist (born 1926)
- February 11 – Colin Ward, English anarchist writer (born 1924)
- February 13 – Lucille Clifton, American poet (born 1936)
- February 14 – Dick Francis, Welsh novelist (born 1920)
- February 16 – Jim Harmon, American science fiction writer (born 1933)
- February 17 – Arnold Beichman, American writer (born 1913)
- February 23 – Mervyn Jones, English novelist and biographer (born 1922)
- February 27 – Carlos Montemayor, Mexican writer (born 1947)
- March 1 – Barry Hannah, American novelist and short story writer (born 1942)
- March 3 – Momo Kapor, Serbian writer (born 1937)
- March 9 – Alda Neves da Graça do Espírito Santo, São Tome poet (born 1926)
- March 10 – Truddi Chase, American autobiographical author (born c. 1935)
- March 11 – Matilde Elena López, Salvadoran poet, essayist and playwright (born 1919)
- March 12 – Miguel Delibes, Spanish novelist (born 1920)
- March 14 – Vinda Karandikar, Indian poet and writer in Marathi (born 1918)
- March 15
  - Joseph Galdon, Filipino priest, academic and writer (born 1928)
  - Patricia Wrightson, Australian children's writer (born 1921)
- March 16 – Jane Sherman, American writer (born 1908)
- March 17 – Sid Fleischman, American children's writer (born 1920)
- March 18 – Amanda Castro, Honduran poet (born 1962)
- March 20 – Ai Ogawa, American poet (born 1947)
- March 21 – Susana, Lady Walton, Argentine writer (born 1926)
- March 24 – William Mayne, English children's novelist (born 1928)
- March 28 – Zofia Romanowiczowa, Polish writer and translator (born 1922)
- April 2 – Carolyn Rodgers, American poet (born 1940)
- April 9
  - Hisashi Inoue (井上 ひさし), Japanese novelist and playwright (born 1934)
  - Kerstin Thorvall, Swedish author, illustrator and journalist (born 1925)
- April 14 – Erika Burkart, Swiss German-language author (born 1922)
- April 16 – Carlos Franqui, Cuban writer and activist (born 1921)
- April 20 – Myles Wilder, American television comedy writer (born 1933)
- April 23 – Peter Porter, Australian-born British poet (born 1929)
- April 25 – Alan Sillitoe, English novelist (born 1928)
- April 28
  - Evelyn Cunningham, American journalist (born 1916)
  - Stefania Grodzieńska, Polish writer and actress (born 1914)
- May 1 – T. M. Aluko, Nigerian writer (born 1918)
- May 3
  - Mohammed Abed al-Jabri, Moroccan philosopher and writer (born 1935)
  - Peter O'Donnell, English novelist (born 1920)
- May 6 – Hoàng Cầm, Vietnamese poet and playwright (born 1922)
- May 7
  - Rane Arroyo, American poet (cerebral hemorrhage, born 1954)
  - Anders Buraas, Norwegian journalist (born 1915)
- May 12 – Allan Manings, American television writer (born 1924)
- May 18 – Edoardo Sanguineti, Italian poet (born 1930)
- June 1 – Andrei Voznesensky, Soviet-Russian poet (born 1933)
- June 18 – José Saramago, Portuguese writer and Nobel Prize laureate (born 1922)
- June 19 – Carlos Monsiváis, Mexican writer, critic and activist (born 1938)
- July 2 – Beryl Bainbridge, English novelist (born 1932)
- July 4 – Robert Neil Butler, American physician and author (born 1927)
- July 9 – Jessica Anderson, Australian novelist and short story writer (born 1916)
- July 12 – Harvey Pekar, American comic book writer (born 1939)
- July 20 – Iris Gower, Welsh novelist (born 1939)
- August 6 – Tony Judt, English historian (born 1948)
- August 9 – Juan Marichal, Spanish historian (born 1922)
- August 10 – Marie de Garis, Guernsey ethnographer and philologist (born 1910)
- August 12 – Laurence Gardner, English writer (born 1943)
- August 13 – Patrick Cauvin, French novelist (born 1932)
- August 14 – Terje Stigen, Norwegian author (born 1922)
- August 16 – Narayan Gangaram Surve, Indian poet (born 1926)
- August 17
  - Sir Frank Kermode, Manx-born literary critic (born 1919)
  - Ludvík Kundera, Czech writer and translator (born 1920)
  - Edwin Morgan, Scottish poet (born 1920)
- August 18 – Efraim Sevela, Russian writer and screenwriter (born 1928)
- August 20 – David J. Weber, American historian and author (born 1940)
- August 21 – Rodolfo Enrique Fogwill, Argentine writer (born 1941)
- August 27
  - George Hitchcock, American poet (born 1914)
  - Ravindra Kelekar, Indian author and poet (born 1925)
- August 29 – A. C. Baantjer, Dutch author (born 1923)
- August 31 – Vance Bourjaily, American novelist, playwright and essayist (born 1922)
- September 3 – Micky Burn, English writer and poet (born 1912)
- September 5
  - Elizabeth Jenkins, English author (born 1905)
  - Lewis Nkosi, South African writer (born 1936)
- September 7 – Barbara Holland, American author (born 1933)
- September 10 – Edwin Charles Tubb, English science fiction author (born 1919)
- September 11 – Fathi Osman, Egyptian author (born 1928)
- September 12 – Judith Merkle Riley, American author (born 1942)
- September 18 – James Bacon, American author (born 1914)
- September 20 – Jennifer Rardin, American author (born 1965)
- September 24 – Gilda O'Neill, English novelist and historian (born 1951)
- September 29 – Clifford B. Hicks, American writer and editor (born 1920)
- October 1 – Mikhail Roshchin, Russian playwright (born 1933)
- October 4 – Henrique de Senna Fernandes, Macanese author (born 1923)
- October 5
  - Alba Bouwer, South African writer in Afrikaans (born 1920)
  - Bernard Clavel, French writer (born 1923)
- October 11 – Claire Rayner, English author (born 1931)
- October 12 – Belva Plain, American novelist (born 1915)
- October 13 – Donald H. Tuck, Australian science fiction bibliographer (born 1922)
- October 20
  - Eva Ibbotson, Austrian-born English novelist (born 1925)
  - Robert Katz, American writer (born 1933)
  - Julian Roberts, English scholar and librarian (born 1930)
- October 21 – A. Ayyappan, Indian poet in Malayalam (born 1945)
- October 22 – Alí Chumacero, Mexican writer and poet (born 1918)
- October 23 – George Cain, American author (born 1943)
- October 24 – Joseph Stein, American playwright (born 1912)
- October 25 – Vesna Parun, Croatian poet (born 1922)
- October 29 – Bärbel Mohr, German author (born 1964)
- October 30 – Harry Mulisch, Dutch writer (born 1927)
- November 1 – Monica Johnson, American novelist (born 1946)
- November 3 – P. Lal, Indian writer (born 1929)
- November 4 – Ophelia Dimalanta, Filipino poet (born 1932)
- November 5 – Adrian Păunescu, Romanian author and poet (born 1943)
- November 8
  - Philip Carlo, American crime author (born 1949)
  - George Solomos, American poet and writer (born 1925)
- November 9 – Ektor Kaknavatos, Greek poet (born 1920)
- November 11 – Carlos Edmundo de Ory, Spanish poet (born 1923)
- November 15
  - Edmond Amran El Maleh, Moroccan writer (born 1917)
  - Hugh Prather, American self-help author (born 1938)
- November 16 – Ragnhild Magerøy, Norwegian writer (born 1920)
- November 21 – Norris Church Mailer, American author (born 1949)
- November 25
  - Alfred Balk, American journalist and author (born 1930)
  - Yaroslav Pavulyak, Ukrainian poet (born 1948)
- November 29 – Bella Akhmadulina, Russian poet (born 1937)
- December 5
  - David French, Canadian playwright (born 1939)
  - Heda Margolius Kovály, Czech author (born 1919)
- December 6 – Martin Russ, American author (born 1931)
- December 7 – Elizabeth Edwards, American author (born 1949)
- December 9 – Meirion Pennar, Welsh poet and academic, son of Pennar Davies (born 1944)
- December 14 – Ruth Park, New Zealand children's writer (born 1917)
- December 16 – A. T. Q. Stewart, Northern Irish historian and academic (born 1929)
- December 20 – Brian Hanrahan, English journalist (born 1949)
- December 24 – Elisabeth Beresford, French-born English children's writer (born 1926)

== Awards ==
- Nobel Prize in Literature: to Mario Vargas Llosa

=== Australia ===
- Miles Franklin Award: Peter Temple, Truth

=== Canada ===
- Dayne Ogilvie Prize: Main award, Nancy Jo Cullen; honours of distinction, Lisa Foad, George K. Ilsley.
- Edna Staebler Award for Creative Non-Fiction: John Leigh Walters, A Very Capable Life
- Governor General's Awards: Multiple categories; see 2010 Governor General's Awards.
- Hilary Weston Writers' Trust Prize for Nonfiction: James FitzGerald, What Disturbs Our Blood: A Son's Quest to Redeem the Past
- Rogers Writers' Trust Fiction Prize: Emma Donoghue, Room
- Scotiabank Giller Prize: Johanna Skibsrud, The Sentimentalists
- Writers' Trust Engel/Findley Award: Miriam Toews

=== Sweden ===
- Astrid Lindgren Memorial Award: Kitty Crowther

=== United Kingdom ===
- Caine Prize for African Writing: Olufemi Terry, "Stickfighting Days"
- Carnegie Medal for children's literature: Neil Gaiman, The Graveyard Book
- Man Booker Prize: Howard Jacobson, The Finkler Question
- Orange Prize for Fiction: Barbara Kingsolver, The Lacuna
- Walter Scott Prize (first award): Hilary Mantel, Wolf Hall

=== United States ===
- American Academy of Arts and Letters: Steve Erickson
- Lambda Literary Awards: Multiple categories; see 2010 Lambda Literary Awards.
- National Book Award for Fiction: to Lord of Misrule by Jaimy Gordon
- National Book Critics Circle Award: to A Visit from the Goon Squad by Jennifer Egan
- PEN/Faulkner Award for Fiction: to War Dances by Sherman Alexie
- Pulitzer Prize for Fiction: to Tinkers by Paul Harding
- Whiting Awards: Fiction: Michael Dahlie, Rattawut Lapcharoensap, Lydia Peelle; Nonfiction: Elif Batuman, Amy Leach, Saïd Sayrafiezadeh; Plays: David Adjmi; Poetry: Matt Donovan, Jane Springer, L.B. Thompson

=== Other ===
- Camões Prize: Ferreira Gullar
- European Book Prize: Sofi Oksanen, Purge and Roberto Saviano, Beauty and the Inferno
- Friedenspreis des Deutschen Buchhandels: David Grossman
- International Dublin Literary Award: Gerbrand Bakker, The Twin
- International Prize for Arabic Fiction: Abdo Khal, She Throws Sparks
- Petrarca-Preis: Pierre Michon, for his body of work
- SAARC Literary Award: Abhi Subedi, Hamid Mir, Mark Tully, Ju

== See also ==
- List of literary awards
- List of poetry awards
- 2010 in Australian literature
