= The Outfit =

The Outfit or Outfit may refer to:

== Arts and entertainment ==
- The Outfit (1973 film), a crime film starring Robert Duvall
- The Outfit (2022 film), an American crime drama film
- The Outfit (video game), a game for the Xbox 360 console
- Outfit, a term used in the PlanetSide 2 game, referring to a gaming group, or clan, within the game
- The Outfit, a graphic novel by Darwyn Cooke
- The Outfit, a novel in the Parker series by Donald E. Westlake, writing as Richard Stark
- "Outfit", a song by the Drive By Truckers on the album Decoration Day
- The Outfit, a criminal organization in the television series, Viper
- Outfit X, a fictional for-hire terrorist organization in the 2023 Indian film Pathaan
- The Outfit, a Chicago-based rock band known for their energetic and authentic rock sound

== Other uses ==
- Outfit, a synonym for equipment, kit, gear
- Outfit, colloquial for (a band of) people, group, gang, bunch
- Outfit, a crime syndicate or other organization
- The Outfit, alternate name for the Chicago Outfit crime syndicate in the US
- Outfit (retailer), a chain of out-of-town clothing stores in the UK
- The Outfit: The Role of Chicago's Underworld in the Shaping of Modern America, a 2003 non-fiction book by Gus Russo about the Chicago mafia
