= Hensley v. Shelter Mutual Insurance =

Court case

Hensley v. Shelter Mutual Insurance Co.
- Court: Missouri Court of Appeals, Southern District, Division Two
- Decided: 4 January 2007
- Citation: 210 S.W.3d 455 (Mo. Ct. App. 2007)

Hensley v. Shelter Mutual Insurance Co., 210 S.W.3d 455 (Mo. Ct. App. 2007) was a Missouri court case which set out the legal test to demonstrate bad faith by an insurer. The plaintiff-respondent won against the defendant, successfully proving that the refusal to settle his property damage claim after a significant fire was vexatious. The case was discussed in professor Jay M. Feinman's book Delay, Deny, Defend.
