= The Next Hundred Million =

The Next Hundred Million: America in 2050
- Hardcover version cover
- Author: Joel Kotkin
- Language: English
- Subject: Demographics of the United States
- Publisher: Penguin Press
- Publication date: 2010
- Publication place: United States
- Media type: Print (Hardback & Paperback)
- ISBN: 978-1594202445

The Next Hundred Million: America in 2050 is a non-fiction book by American economist and demographer Joel Kotkin. The author outlines a world in which the growing US population reaches four hundred million by 2050. He argues that the US will become more diverse (with a trend towards ethnic/racial mixing) and more competitive, and he predicts that the US will experience continual economic growth that advances the population's standard of living. Kotkin writes that the US "should emerge by mid-century as the most affluent, culturally rich and successful nation in human history".

== Contents ==
Kotkin focuses on residential patterns among Americans. Contrasting suburbs and smaller cities with large metropolises, Kotkin argues against the thesis of urban theorists such as Jane Jacobs. Kotkin writes that suburbs provide diversity and new ideas as immigrants assimilate into American society. He identifies issues with large major cities such as San Francisco and New York City. He views those areas as caught inside "the glamorous road to decline" with less incentive for ordinary, working class Americans to stay and with social policies benefiting the upper crust.

Kotkin envisions a future of "smart sprawl" in which medium to low density suburbs without central dependence on big cities draw in increasing numbers of people. He writes that "in a dramatic change, the new suburbs will be far more diverse ethnically than those of the past."

Kotkin concludes the book by arguing:

None of it will be easy, and certainly much can go wrong. Still we have no reason to lose faith in the possibilities of the future. For all its problems, America remains, as the journalist John Gunther suggested over sixty years ago, 'lousy with greatness'. The elements essential to forge a successful nation of four hundred million remain very much within our reach, there for the taking.

== Reviews ==
Refreshing and reassuring declared Thomas Bergen about Kotkin’s The Next Hundred Million whose analysis was grounded in observation making his vision accessible and useful.

Journalist Joe Friesen wrote for The Globe and Mail praising the book. He wrote tongue-in-cheek, "American decline is seductive, particularly to Canadians." Friesen remarked that "when it comes to the future, the field tends to be dominated by those who preach doom and gloom.... Kotkin provides a well-argued, well-researched and refreshingly calm perspective."

Philip Langdon panned the book in the New Urban Network. He wrote, "Disseminating information that doesn't withstand scrutiny seems to be characteristic of Kotkin". Langon argued that Kotkin cherry-picked data points to support the narrative that suburban life is superior to urban life. Langdon described the book's mission as "to disparage dense development, central cities, smart growth, and ambitious government planning".

Nick Schulz writing in the Wall Street Journal calls Kotkin’s vision of America’s future over the next 40 years convincing; however, Kotkin could have made more of an effort to describe the condition of underclass American families that have seen a growth of single mother households.

== See also ==
- Demographics of the United States
- Emigration from the United States
- Immigration to the United States
- The Death and Life of Great American Cities
- The Ultimate Resource
- 2010 in literature
