= Taube und Wildente =

2022 novel by Martin Mosebach

- Author: Martin Mosebach
- Language: German
- Publisher: Dtv Verlagsgesellschaft
- Publication date: 19 October 2022
- Publication place: Germany
- Pages: 336
- ISBN: 978-3-423-28000-6

Taube und Wildente (lit. 'Dove and Wild Duck') is a 2022 novel by the German writer Martin Mosebach. It is set among German cultural workers, who all detest each other, and follows the unscrupulous Marjorie, remarried to the manager of a small unprofitable publishing house. The title refers to the painting Tote Feldtaube und Wildente by Otto Schloderer, which features in the plot. Verena Auffermann of Deutschlandfunk Kultur described the book as a genre painting of "the depravation of a propertied social class".
