= Purple Jesus =

2010 novel by Ron Cooper

- First edition
- Author: Ron Cooper
- Language: English
- Publisher: Bancroft Press
- Publication date: 2010

Purple Jesus is a 2010 humorous novel in the Southern Gothic style. It was written by Ron Cooper and published by Bancroft Press. Cooper's previous novel Hume's Fork, was released by Bancroft Press in 2007.

== Summary ==
The novel focuses around three characters: Purvis Driggers, a 24-year-old unemployed man, Martha Umphlett, a divorced young woman made to live with the family she once escaped, and Brother Andrew, a monk devoted more to nature than God. Their stories intertwine through a series of events related to a murder, a love triangle, and the sightings of a legendary woodland figure known as the Hairy Man.

== Reception ==
Ron Rash, author of Serena, said, “ Purple Jesus is a novel that deserves a place on the bookshelf between O'Connor's Wise Blood and Crews' The Gospel Singer, but Ron Cooper has his own unique voice, and what a marvelous, darkly comic voice it is.” Jay Parini, author of The Last Station, wrote, “Purvis Driggers, the novel's hero—if that word remotely connects to this bizarre figure on the bottom layer of a world that defies description—stays in the head, and he won't go away. The writing is antic, smart, and often memorable. This is a fine novel.” Fred Chappell, founding member of the Fellowship of Southern Writers, said, “Ron Cooper’s Purple Jesus is a happy handful of a book. With characters as recognizable as they are eccentric, a storyline as inclusive as a revival tent, and a prose style that snaps like garters, it is one nifty read. Anyone who doesn’t enjoy this novel just doesn’t know how to have a good time.” The Washington Post called it "...a literary event of the first magnitude."

It was also reviewed in The New York Times, Southern Literary Review and Booklist.
