= The Heresy of Formlessness =

2002 essay collection by Martin Mosebach

- 2018 revised edition
- Author: Martin Mosebach
- Original title: Häresie der Formlosigkeit
- Language: German
- Publisher: Karolinger Verlag
- Publication date: 2002
- Publication place: Austria
- English publication date: 2018
- Pages: 158 (1st version); 249 (expanded)
- ISBN: 3854181027

The Heresy of Formlessness: The Roman Liturgy and Its Enemy (German: Häresie der Formlosigkeit. Die römische Liturgie und ihr Feind) is an essay collection by the German writer Martin Mosebach. Mosebach, a Traditionalist Catholic, writes about the importance of liturgy and argues in favour of a mass revival of the Tridentine Mass in Ecclesiastical Latin, while criticizing the Mass of Paul VI in the vernacular as an expression of religious and cultural decline.

== Publication ==
Karolinger Verlag in Vienna published the first version of the book in 2002. A new version, expanded with three essays, was published by Carl Hanser Verlag in Munich in 2007.
