= The Kazakhstan Way =

2010 book by Nursultan Nazarbayev

- Author: Nursultan Nazarbayev
- Original title: Казахстанский путь
- Language: Russian
- Genre: Non-fiction
- Publication date: 18 May 2010

The Kazakhstan Way (Note: Russian: Казахстанский путь, Kazakhstanskiy put', lit. 'The Kazakhstani way') is a book by Nursultan Nazarbayev, the former President of the Republic of Kazakhstan. In the book, Nazarbayev describes the process of Kazakhstan's independence and the planning and execution of economic and political reforms. The Kazakhstan Way was published on 18 May 2010 and presented at a launch event in Salou, Spain.

Said Nursultan Nazarbayev of the book, "I devote this book to our young generation – a special generation. You have been born and are maturing in an independent Kazakhstan already. The time of your youth is the time of our country's rising and blossoming. You have absorbed the spirit of achievement and success. Your destinies will define the destiny of our country... My book, describing events of the past, is actually oriented towards the future. I hope that my book will be a handbook of future leaders of Kazakhstan."
