= Bancroft Press =

Publishing company

- Status: Active
- Founded: 1992; 33 years ago
- Country of origin: United States
- Headquarters location: Baltimore
- Key people: Bruce Bortz
- Publication types: books
- Official website: bancroftpress.com

Bancroft Press is a small American, general interest book publishing company which publishes 3-6 books per year. It was founded in 1992 by Bruce Bortz. Operating in Baltimore for 29 years, it moved to Los Angeles in 2022.

The company's more significant publications include Bill O'Reilly's first and only novel (Those Who Trespass) and a Book of the Month Club-selected book about the assassination of John F. Kennedy, Live by the Sword by Gus Russo.

== History ==
By 2013, it has published 25 Young Adult books. One of them, The Reappearance of Sam Webber by Jonathan Scott Fuqua, won the ALA's Alex Award. A second, Uncovering Sadie's Secrets by Libby Sternberg, was an Edgar finalist.

On the adult side, its The Missing Kennedy (author Elizabeth Koehler-Pentacoff) was a New York Times ebook bestseller after appearing on the cover of People Magazine.

Bancroft has published four Pulitzer Prize winners, a Guggenheim Fellow, and many bestselling authors who’ve offered titles on subjects as diverse as cancer survival and climate change.

Publishers Weekly named Bancroft a “top 10 indie,” noting, “being a maverick also applies to the way Bancroft promotes and sells its books.” Bortz and his team pursue every avenue, utilizing hundreds of different direct and strategic marketing sales avenues, depending on timing, subject matter, author influence, marketplace learning, statistical fluctuations, and endorsement campaigns.
