= Martin Mosebach =

German writer

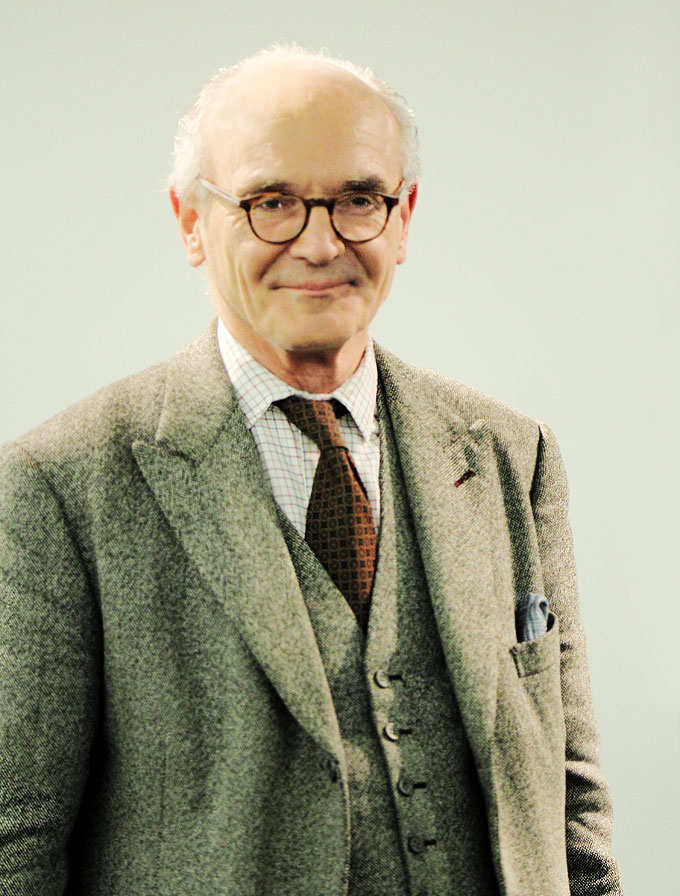
Martin Mosebach (2014)

Martin Mosebach (born 31 July 1951, in Frankfurt am Main) is a German writer.

== Biography ==
He has published novels, stories, and collections of poems, written scripts for several films, opera libretti, theatre and radio plays. His first major non-fiction work is the book The 21 - A Journey into the Land of Coptic Martyrs detailing his visit to Egypt to examine the lives of the 21 Coptic martyrs beheaded by ISIS in 2015.

The German Academy for Language and Literature praised him for "combining stylistic splendour with original storytelling that demonstrates a humorous awareness of history."

He is a Traditionalist Roman Catholic. Among Mosebach's works translated into English is The Heresy of Formlessness, a collection of essays on the Latin language Tridentine Mass and its replacement by the vernacular Mass of Paul VI, as viewed from the perspective of a Catholic author and intellectual. It has been published in the United States by Ignatius Press. The book argues for a return to the Tridentine Mass, about which the 2007 motu proprio Summorum Pontificum declared that, rather than a "rite", it is a form of the one Roman Rite, stating also that the 1962 Roman Missal, which contained its final form, had never been formally abrogated.

Other works include The Turkish Woman, The Tremor, The Long Night and Prince of Mist, in which the author examines the motives behind man's eternal search for a meaning.

In 2017, he signed a document along with a number of other clergy and academics labeled as a "Filial Correction" of Pope Francis.

== Awards ==
Mosebach was awarded the Kleist Prize in 2002. In 2007, he was awarded the Georg Büchner Prize.

== Publications ==
The following is a partial list of publications written by Mosebach:

=== Novels ===
- 1983: Das Bett (The Bed) ISBN 3-423-13069-5
- 1985: Ruppertshain 3-423-13159-4
- 1992: Westend ISBN 3-423-13240-X
- 1999: Die Türkin (The Turkish Woman) ISBN 3-7466-1793-6
- 2000: Eine lange Nacht (A Long Night) ISBN 3-7466-1974-2
- 2001: Der Nebelfürst (Prince of the Mist) ISBN 3-423-13119-5
- 2005: Das Beben (The Tremor) ISBN 978-3-446-20661-8
- 2007: Der Mond und das Mädchen (The Moon and the Maiden) ISBN 978-3-446-20916-9
- 2010: What Was Before (Was davor geschah) ISBN 978-3-446-23562-5
- 2014: Das Blutbuchenfest ISBN 978-3-446-24479-5
- 2022: Taube und Wildente ISBN 978-3-423-28000-6

=== Short story collections ===
- 1995 Das Kissenbuch : Gedichte und Zeichnungen ISBN 3-458-19127-5
- 1995 Stilleben mit wildem Tier: Erzählungen ISBN 3-8270-0130-7
- 1996 Das Grab Der Pulcinellen: Erzählungen, Pasticci, Phantasien ISBN 3-423-12863-1
- 1997 Die Schöne Gewohnheit zu Leben: eine italienische Reise ISBN 978-3-8270-0934-0
- 2008 Stadt der wilden Hunde: Nachrichten aus dem alltäglichen Indien ISBN 3-446-23026-2

=== Essays ===
- 2002 Häresie der Formlosigkeit. Die römische Liturgie und ihr Feind (The Heresy of Formlessness) ISBN 978-3-446-20869-8
- 2002 Mein Frankfurt ISBN 3-458-34571-X
- 2006 Schöne Literatur: Essays ISBN 978-3-446-20711-0
- 2012 Der Ultramontane ISBN 978-3-86744-215-2

=== Non-fiction ===
- 2019 The 21: A Journey into the Land of Coptic Martyrs ISBN 978-0-87486-839-5
