= Fathi Osman =

Egyptian writer and scholar (1928–2010)

Mohamed Fathi Osman (March 17, 1928 – September 11, 2010) was an Egyptian-American author and scholar who advocated on behalf of cooperation between Islam and other religions and whose writings include an overview of the Koran for the general public.

== Biography ==
Osman was born on March 17, 1928, in Minya, Egypt. He joined the Muslim Brotherhood in the 1940s and worked on its weekly journal. Osman was awarded an undergraduate degree in 1948 from Cairo University where he majored in history in 1948. He broke with Sayyid Qutb and the Muslim Brotherhood during the 1950s and wrote the 1960 book Islamic Thought and Change, which presented a more progressive view of the religion, earned a law degree in 1960 from Alexandria University in 1960 and returned to Cairo University where he received a master's degree in Islamic-Byzantine relations in 1962. He was on the faculty of Al-Azhar University during the 1960s, where he worked on restructuring the teaching of Islam at universities and colleges in Egypt. He was granted a doctorate in Near Eastern studies in 1976 from Princeton University, where he wrote a dissertation on the subject of Islamic land ownership and taxation and later taught history at Imam Muhammad ibn Saud Islamic University in Saudi Arabia.

Osman's writings, including 40 books written in English and Arabic, were aimed at making Islamic civilization and culture more understandable to non-Muslims and at showing followers of Islam that the religion provided the flexibility to adapt to modern times. The New York Times cited Osman's "monumental" 1997 book Concepts of the Quran: A Topical Reading as "his most important work in English", in which he explicated concepts in Islam for non-Muslims. The Los Angeles Times called the book "a milestone in Islamic scholarship that has made the central text of the Muslim religion more accessible to English speakers". Other works written by Osman covered subjects such as Sharia and civil law, the rights of women, religious pluralism and the applicability of Western ideas by Muslims, topics he covered in Arabic in the 1963 text The Individual in Muslim Society: Mutual Rights and Obligations and Human Rights in Western Thought and Islamic Law in 1981. English language publications include the 1990 publication Muslim Women in the Family and the Society and the 1995 releases Islamic Law in the Contemporary Society: Shari'a Dynamics of Change and Children of Adam: An Islamic Perspective on Pluralism.

He moved to Los Angeles in 1987, where he was chosen as a scholar in residence at the Islamic Center of Southern California. There he helped establish the Institute for the Study of Islam in the Contemporary World and served as a senior scholar at the University of Southern California's Center for Muslim-Jewish Engagement. Dafer M. Dakhil of the Center for Muslim-Jewish Engagement called Osman someone who believed that "Islam is a dynamic and flexible religion able to engage modernity and the issues of human rights and women's issues".

Osman died at age 82 on September 11, 2010, at his home in Montrose, California due to congestive heart failure. He was survived by his wife, Aida Abdel-Rahman Osman, as well as by his daughter Ghada Osman, a professor of Arabic studies at San Diego State University.

== Bibliography ==
- Concepts of the Quran (1999), pub. Multimedia Vera International ISBN 1-881504-41-7
