= Joel Kotkin =

American urban studies scholar

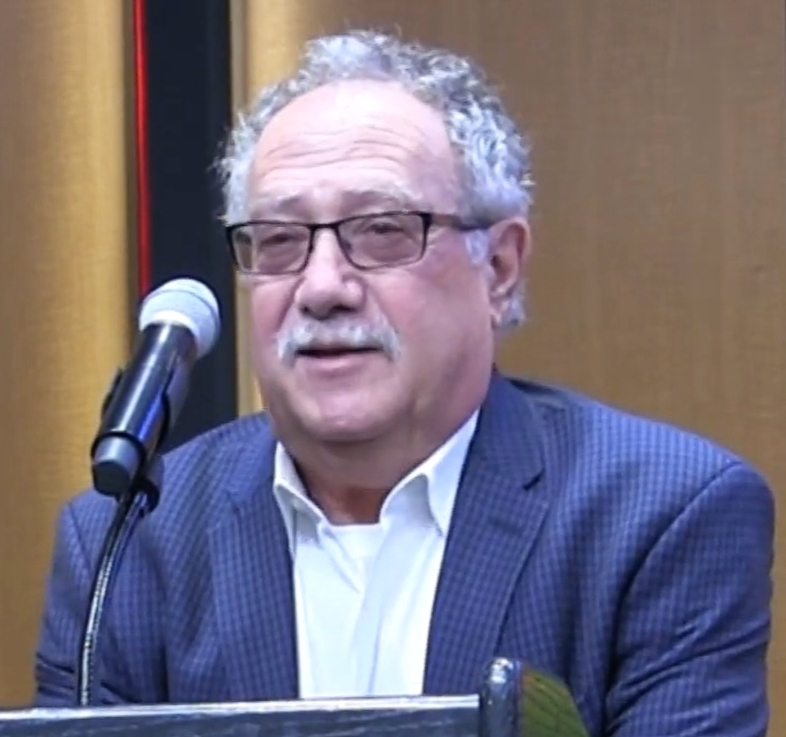
Kotkin speaks at Texas Tech University in 2019

Joel Kotkin is a writer on urban affairs. He is fellow in urban studies at Chapman University in Orange, California. He is currently a regular contributor to The Daily Telegraph.

He was a regular contributor to the conservative magazine The Spectator through December 2025 and was a regular contributor to The Daily Beast through May 2022.

== Books and thought ==
Kotkin is the author of several books. The New Class Conflict was published in September 2014 by Telos Press Publishing. In this book, Kotkin assesses the changing complexities of class in the United States, which he argues can no longer be understood in terms of traditional political divisions between left and right or conservative and liberal. For Kotkin, the new class order of the twenty-first century is marked by the rise of a high-tech oligarchy, a culturally dominant academic and media (both journalism and entertainment) elite, an expansive government bureaucracy, and a declining middle class.

In The Next Hundred Million: America in 2050 (Penguin Press, 2010), Kotkin speculated how the nation might evolve in the next four decades.

He has also authored The City: A Global History and The New Geography, books about city development, and has studied various major cities, including Houston, New Orleans, New York City, St. Louis, and Los Angeles. Previously he was a fellow at the New America Foundation, Pepperdine University, and at the Milken Institute.

Kotkin argues that the model of urban development as exemplified by pre-automobile cities such as New York City and Paris is outdated in many cases. Kotkin believes in a "back to basics" approach which stresses nurturing the middle class and families with primarily single-family suburban development. He states that the current trend of growth of suburbs will be the dominant pattern around the world. As a result, one of his arguments is that rail transit is not always ideal for modern cities and suburbs.

Kotkin wrote The Coming of Neo-Feudalism: A Warning to the Global Middle Class (Encounter Books, 2020).

Kotkin is Jewish and writes regularly on antisemitism. He is a Zionist.
