= Bernard Le Nail =

French writer and Breton militant

- Born: 12 February 1946; Paris, France
- Died: 5 January 2010 (aged 63); Rennes, France
- Education: HEC Paris
- Occupations: French writer and Breton militant

Bernard Le Nail (Breton: Bernez an Nail; February 1946 – 5 January 2010) was a French writer and Breton militant. After studying commerce at HEC Paris, he headed the promotional office of the Chamber of Commerce and Industry in Nantes. In 1979 he became Secretary General of the Comité d'Etude et de Liaison des Intérêts Bretons (CELIB) at Lanester. Between 1983 and 2000 he was director of the Cultural Institute of Brittany and had an important role in the conception and publication of the collection Les Bretons au-delà des mers : Explorateurs et grands voyageurs (Quimper, Ed. Nouvelles du Finistère, 1996). He was also involved in the conception and publication of the following works: 500 Bretons à connaître (Ancre de Marine, 1989), revising the Guide Bleu Bretagne (Hachette, 1991), Guides Gallimard Bretagne, Les noms qui ont fait l’histoire de Bretagne (Coop Breizh/ICB, 1997), Dictionnaire des femmes en Bretagne (UTL/Coop Breizh, 1999), La Bretagne entre Armor et Argoat (Reader's Digest, 1999).

On 12 November 1999 Le Nail was accused by the French communist newspaper L'Humanité of being a former activist of the Breton separatist organisation the Front de Libération de la Bretagne (FLB) Liberation Front of Brittany. He strenuously denied this accusation, but made no apologies for his defence of Breton culture and language in the face of the highly centralised French state. Several organisations also objected to local councils in Brittany disseminating free of charge, in schools, his and his wife Jacqueline's Dictionnaire des romanciers de Bretagne (Keltia Graphic, 1999), dealing with Breton novelists. Under his own name and under the pseudonym Joseph Bréhier, Le Nail also published numerous articles in newspapers and journals on Breton historical and cultural issues.

In 2001 Le Nail established the publishing house 'Les Portes du large' which specialised in accounts of Breton voyagers and explorers, travelers in Brittany and studies of Breton relations with other Celtic countries.

Bernard Le Nail had a significant role in increasing knowledge of Breton explorers of the coast of Australia, as publisher of Philippe Godard's and Tugdual de Kerros' book on Louis de Saint Aloüarn (2002). In 2010 his publishing house Les Portes du Large published a French translation of a biography of Marc-Joseph Marion Dufresne by Australian historian Edward Duyker.

Le Nail suffered a ruptured aneurysm and massive cerebral haemorrhage on 24 December 2009. He died on 5 January 2010.

== Publications ==
- Le décollage de l’économie irlandaise, mémoire de quatrième année de sciences économiques, 1968.
- Radiographies financières d’entreprises de Loire-Atlantique, Nantes, Chambre de commerce et d’industrie, 1975, 300 pp.
- Guide annuaire culturel de Loire-Atlantique, Nantes, Centre nantais de culture celtique, 1980.
- (chapter on energy in Brittany) in La Bretagne, edited by Yann Brekilien, Paris, Éditions d’organisation, 1982.
- Bretagne, pays de mer, in collaboration with Philippe Plisson (photographer), Paris, Hachette, 1993.
- Explorateurs et grands voyageurs Bretons (dictionnaire biographique), P., Gisserot, 1998.
- (chapter on culture) in L’Espoir Breton du xxie siècle. La Bretagne en âge de réveil, Spézet, Coop Breizh, 1998.
- Dictionnaire des romanciers de Bretagne in collaboration with Jacqueline Le Nail, Gourin, Ed. Keltia Graphic, 1999, 360 pp.
- Dictionnaire des auteurs de jeunesse de Bretagne [in collaboration with Jacqueline Le Nail, preface by François Caradec], Gourin, Keltia Graphic, 2001, 360 pp. 1
- Noms de lieux Bretons à travers le monde; Rennes, Les Portes du large, 2002, 239 pp.
- L'Almanach de la Bretagne; P., Larousse, 2003, 384 pp.
- Pays de Vitré. Hommes et femmes remarquables [in collaboration with Jacqueline Le Nail]; Rennes, Portes du large, 2004, 240 pp.
- Des Bretons au Mexique; Rennes, Portes du large, 2009, 240pp

Bernard Le Nail also edited the following books :

- La Galice, Institut culturel de Bretagne
- Cent peintres en Bretagne, Ed. Palantines
- Géographie littéraire de la Bretagne, Institut culturel de Bretagne
- La Bretagne des grands auteurs, Ouest-France-Edilarge.

== Sources ==
- 'Culture bretonne: Décès de Bernard Le Nail', Le Telegramme, 6 janvier 2010.
- 'Décès de l'éditeur Bernard Le Nail', Ouest-France, 6 janvier 2010.
- The Independent, Friday, 26 February 2010, Obituaries
