= Delay, Deny, Defend =

2010 book by Jay Feinman

Delay, Deny, Defend: Why Insurance Companies Don't Pay Claims and What You Can Do About It
- Author: Jay M. Feinman
- Language: English
- Subject: Insurance law
- Publisher: Portfolio
- Publication date: 2010
- Publication place: New York City
- Media type: Print
- Pages: 256
- ISBN: 978-1-59184-315-3
- OCLC: 430051363
- Dewey Decimal: 368/.0140973
- LC Class: HG8107 .F45 2010
- Website: delaydenydefend.com

Delay, Deny, Defend: Why Insurance Companies Don't Pay Claims and What You Can Do About It is a 2010 book by Rutgers Law professor Jay M. Feinman, and published by Portfolio Hardcover, an imprint of Penguin Group.

== Contents ==
Delay, Deny, Defend is a critical exploration of the property and casualty insurance industry, examining how its practices affect policyholders. Feinman, a law professor specializing in consumer rights and insurance law, argues that the industry prioritizes profits over policyholders' needs, often using tactics like delaying or denying legitimate claims to bolster financial performance. The book attributes these practices to changes in the industry’s structure and goals, driven by the pursuit of investment income and cost-cutting measures.

Feinman writes about the inner workings of major insurers, including State Farm and Allstate, and examines legal cases to illustrate the impact of these practices on consumers. He describes the strategies insurers use to manage claims, including the use of computer algorithms and legal maneuvers, and critiques their potential to erode trust in the industry.

It also studies and cites several case laws such as Hensley v. Shelter Mutual Insurance for example.

Beyond its critique, the book seeks to educate consumers, emphasizing the importance of understanding the inherently business-like nature of insurance relationships. Feinman provides recommendations on how to evaluate and compare insurers, file claims effectively, and advocate for fair treatment.

== Reception ==
Morgan O'Rourke, writing in the journal Risk Management, praised the book as "a fascinating look at how we got here and what we can do to protect ourselves":

"The motivation for this behavior can be summed up in one word: profit. These days, insurance companies are more interested in serving their shareholders than their policyholders. And the easiest way to increase the bottom line is to reduce the losses that come from paying claims. So they delay to take advantage of float (the lag time between taking in premiums and paying out claims) and maximize their earnings on invested premiums. Or they just deny any responsibility to pay at all and then defend their refusal—in court if necessary—in the hopes that the policyholder will give up when they exhaust their resources or the will to fight."

Christina Bramlet, the editor in chief of the insurance industry trade journal Claims Magazine, disparaged it as "[a]n inflammatory, self-proclaimed exposé":

"It would be imprudent to say that readers should not lend any credence whatsoever to Feinman's litany of claimants victimized by the 'system.' As insurance professionals are undoubtedly aware, there are isolated incidents involving misguided employees or occasional lapses in judgment. However, it is altogether likely that any semblance of the truth may be eclipsed by Feinman's battle-cry rhetoric, which may primarily fuel contentiousness between policyholders and insurers and misconceptions about the claim process."

== Acts inspired by phrase ==
The words delay, deny, and depose were found written on the cartridge cases of the bullets used in the killing of Brian Thompson, the CEO of UnitedHealthcare in late 2024. The inscribed words were initially announced by a senior New York City law enforcement official as deny, defend and depose, but police later clarified that it was delay and not defend. News outlets The Daily Beast and CNBC connected the cartridge inscriptions to Feinman's book. The book quickly became a best seller and sold out of copies on Amazon. The killing became a symbol of a resurgent widespread anger toward America's health insurance industry.

On December 13, 2024, it was reported that a Lakeland, Florida woman had been arrested and charged with threats to conduct a mass shooting or an act of terrorism. The woman had reportedly called Anthem Blue Cross Blue Shield about recent medical claim denials, and during the end of the recorded conversation the woman reportedly stated "Delay, Deny, Depose. You people are next." The woman told investigators that she had repeated the words as it was in the news and did not own any firearms, but that she felt the healthcare insurance companies "deserved karma from the world because they are evil".
