= The Magician of Lhasa =

2010 novel by David Michie

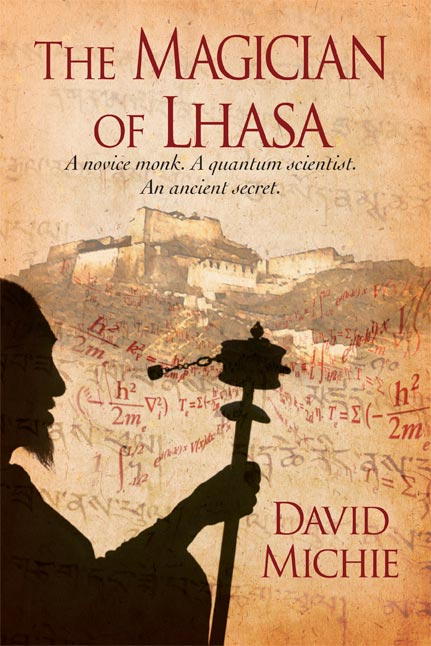
- The Magician of Lhasa - First Edition (2010)
- Author: David Michie
- Cover artist: Sue Campbell
- Language: English
- Genre: Thriller
- Published: 2010 (Trapdoor Books)
- Publication place: United States
- Media type: Hardcover, Paperback
- Pages: 288
- ISBN: 0-9842070-0-7 (hc), ISBN 0-9842070-1-5 (pb), ISBN 0-9842070-2-3 (ebook)

The Magician of Lhasa is a novel by David Michie. The novel follows dual plot lines. The first is set in 1959 and follows a teenage Buddhist monk as he is tasked with transporting an ancient, long-hidden secret of his faith to neighboring India.

The second plot line is set in 2007 and follows a nano-technologist whose research project has been mysteriously taken over by an American corporation.

The novel received stellar reviews, although it was banned in China for its portrayal of the 1959 Tibetan uprising. The Magician of Lhasa has won accolades for illustrating the connection between basic principles of modern physics and ancient Buddhist practices.

The novel is published by Trapdoor Books, an imprint of Trapdoor Publishing.
