= Alfred Balk =

American non-fiction writer (1930–2010)

- Alfred Balk in the 1980s
- Born: July 24, 1930; Oskaloosa, Iowa, U.S.
- Died: November 25, 2010; Huntley, Illinois, U.S.
- Education: Northwestern University
- Occupations: Nonfiction writer, editor
- Spouse: Phyllis Munter Balk

Alfred Balk (July 24, 1930 – November 25, 2010) was an American reporter, nonfiction author and magazine editor who wrote groundbreaking articles about housing segregation, the Nation of Islam, the environment and Illinois politics. His refusal to identify a confidential source led to a landmark court case. During a career-long emphasis on media improvement, he served on the Twentieth Century Fund's task force that established a National News Council, consulted for several foundations, served as secretary of New York Governor Nelson Rockefeller's Committee on the Employment of Minority Groups in the News Media, and produced a film, That the People Shall Know: The Challenge of Journalism, narrated by Walter Cronkite. He wrote and co-authored books on a variety of topics, ranging from the tax exempt status of religious organizations to globalization to the history of radio.

== Early life ==
Alfred William Balk was born in Oskaloosa, Iowa on July 24, 1930, the son of Leslie William Balk and Clara Buell Balk. He grew up in Muscatine, Iowa and Rock Island, Illinois. He began his journalistic career writing for his high school paper, and also landed a job as a sports reporter for the local paper, The Rock Island Argus.

After high school, he enrolled at Augustana College in Rock Island, Illinois and transferred to Northwestern University after a year where he graduated from the Medill School of Journalism with both bachelor's and master's degrees in journalism (1952 and 1953, respectively). He later served in the U.S. Army as a journalist and was stationed in Japan during 1954–1955. He began freelance writing for various magazines while in Japan, and also wrote for a variety of military newspapers during his service.

== Magazine writing career ==
In 1958, after serving as a reporter for the Chicago Sun-Times, he began freelancing full-time.

During eight years of full-time freelancing his most influential articles appeared in the era's leading magazines, including Harper's, The Nation, The New York Times Magazine, The Saturday Evening Post, Reader's Digest and others. Balk was a member of the Society of Magazine Writers, which elected him president in 1969.

While working at the weekly Saturday Evening Post, which for a time retained him under contract as a lead writer, he wrote on subjects such as Mayor Richard J. Daley of Chicago, victims of the fallout-shelter craze, how a T.V. jackpot almost ruined the winners, and defections among Protestant ministers. He co-authored a report on the rise of Elijah Muhammad's Nation of Islam with Alex Haley of future Roots fame. The pioneering article, "Black Merchants of Hate," later led to Haley's classic and bestseller The Autobiography of Malcolm X.

Balk rose to prominence in 1962 after writing an article for the Saturday Evening Post titled “Confession of a Block-Buster” which chronicled a Chicago real estate speculator's strategy of frightening white homeowners into selling their property at a loss and then reselling to black buyers at inflated prices. The article made legal history when a group of black homeowners subsequently tried to compel disclosure of his confidential source, pseudonymous speculator ("Norris Vitchek"). In Baker v. F&F Investment, a U.S. District Court upheld his right to confidentiality, and in 1972 the United States Supreme Court declined to review the decision, and the press pronounced the case a landmark.

Among other prominent articles, for The Reader’s Digest he reported on nursing-home neglect, threats to public parkland, Great Lakes water problems, boating-boom safety hazards, and Thomas Edison remembered by a son; for The Reporter, the social significance of Ebony magazine founder John Johnson’s success; and for The New York Times Magazine, the “Dust Bowl” revisited.

For Harper’s, his subjects included zoning abuses, a builder who made integration pay, and two high-profile cover stories. One, a collaboration with then-State Sen. Paul Simon on “The Illinois Legislature: A Study in Corruption” (September 1964), spurred ethics reforms and vaulted Simon to national prominence, a U.S. Senate seat, and a legacy including helping foster President-to-be Barack Obama’s political rise. The other, “God Is Rich” (October 1967), on religious organizations’ tax exemptions, led to the book The Religion Business (John Knox Press) and, under a Foundation fellowship, a nationwide study The Free List: Property Without Taxes (Russell Sage Foundation), which Time, in a two-page report (May 3, 1971), described as “a penetrating new book.”

== Magazine editing and industry leadership ==
Balk moved to New York in 1966 as features editor and editor at large of Saturday Review under Norman Cousins. Three years later, he became editor of the Columbia Journalism Review and also taught at Columbia's Graduate School of Journalism. Balk's colleague and the magazine's founder, James Boylan wrote “As an editor, he worked with determination, often stubbornness, turning the Review into a reporters’ magazine, tougher and grittier.”

He left Columbia Journalism Review in 1973 to serve as founding editor of World Press Review, a monthly foreign press digest, hiring Marion K. Sanders of Harper's and other distinguished journalists to build a successful publication, which was later acquired by The Stanley Foundation. His last magazine position, from 1989 to 1991, was as managing editor of the Institute of Electrical and Electronics Engineers' publication, IEEE Spectrum. He also was an Executive Committee member of the American Society of Magazine Editors, Overseas Press Club, as well as a consultant to the Twentieth Century Fund, the Ford Foundation and the Markle Foundation. In the mid-1970s, he delivered media commentaries on CBS Morning News. Throughout the 1970s - 1980s and 90s, his writing on media appeared in Nieman Reports, Columbia Journalism Review, Editor and Publisher, Folio, and other journalism organs.

== Later life and writings ==
In 1991, Balk moved to Syracuse in upstate New York to teach journalism at the S.I. Newhouse School of Public Communications. There he wrote his eighth book, The Rise of Radio: From Marconi Through the Golden Age (McFarland, 2006) which received positive reviews from other media professionals, including Mike Wallace of CBS.

All told, during his lifetime, Balk wrote more than 100 magazine articles and seven books.

== Personal life and death ==
Balk married Phyllis Munter, of Moline, Illinois, in 1953. They met while in high school representing rival schools on a local radio program. His wife served as an important support throughout her husband's career, as indicated in Balk's scholarly papers in the collections of the Newberry Library in Chicago and Syracuse University. She was also known in her own right for extensive volunteer and charitable work.

Balk died of colon cancer on November 25, 2010 in his home in Huntley, Illinois, aged 80. He was survived by his wife, two daughters and two grandchildren. His wife, Phyllis, died on May 4, 2011.

== Books ==
- The Rise of Radio, from Marconi through the Golden Age (McFarland, 2006).
- Movie Palace Masterpiece: Saving Syracuse’s Loew’s State/Landmark Theatre (Landmark Foundation, 1998).
- The Myth of American Eclipse: The New Global Age (Transaction), 1990.
- A Free and Responsive Press (Twentieth Century Fund, Paperback), 1972.
- Our Troubled Press: Ten Years of Columbia Journalism Review co-author with James Boylan, Little Brown, 1971.
- The Free List: Property Without Taxes (Russell Sage/Basic Books), 1970.
- The Religion Business (John Knox Press), 1968.
- Kup’s Chicago: A Many-Faceted and Affectionate Portrait (collaboration with Irv Kupcinet, World), 1962.

== Articles ==
=== Saturday Evening Post ===
- “Anyone for Survival” (Mar. 27, 1965)
- “The Last Dinosaur Wins Again” (May 11, 1963)
- “Black Merchants of Hate” (with Alex Haley; Jan. 26, 1963)
- “Why I Quit the Ministry” (with an anonymous ex-minister; Nov. 17, 1962)
- “Confessions of a Block-Buster” (July 14–21, 1962)
- “A Jackpot Almost Ruined Their Lives” (July 15, 1961).

=== Harper's ===
- “God Is Rich” (Oct., 1967)
- “Zoning: Invitation to Bribery” (Oct. 1966)
- “The Builder Who Makes Integration Pay” (July, 1965)
- “The Illinois Legislature: A Study in Corruption” (with Sen. Paul Simon; Sept., 1964).

=== Reader's Digest ===
- “Water Crisis on the Great Lakes” (Mar., 1965)
- “The Shame of Our Nursing Homes” (Jan., 1965)
- “Danger Rides in Small Boats” (Aug., 1962)
- “My Most Unforgettable Character” (December 1961)
- “Good-Bye to Our Public Parks” (November 1960).

=== The Reporter ===
- “Mr. Johnson Finds His Market” (Nov. 12, 1959).

=== New York Times Magazine ===
- “When the Wind Blew Black Blizzards” (Nov. 10, 1963).
