= Squirrel's New Year's Resolution =

2010 picture book by Pat Miller

- Author: Pat Miller
- Illustrator: Kathi Ember
- Language: English
- Genre: Children's Picture book
- Published: 2010 (Albert Whitman and Company)
- Publication place: USA
- Media type: Print (hardback)
- Pages: 32 (unpaginated)
- ISBN: 9780807575918
- OCLC: 1003922326

Squirrel's New Year's Resolution is a 2010 Children's picture book written by Pat Miller and illustrated by Kathi Ember. It is about Squirrel who wants to make a New Year's resolution but initially doesn't know what it is (her friend Bear explains it to her), then helps her friends (Skunk, Mole, Turtle, and Porcupine) with theirs but is unable to think of one for herself. Finally, Rabbit tells her that she actually resolved to help someone every day.

== Reception ==
A review in Publishers Weekly of Squirrel's New Year's Resolution wrote "Ember's thoughtfully detailed acrylic paintings create a friendly woodland setting for this largely conflict-free story." and concluded "it should get kids considering resolutions of their own.". Booklist wrote "The story line gets a little muddy as the resolutions become more interrelated, but the happy pictures and the (possibly new) knowledge that a resolution is an important, attainable goal carry the day. Perfect for those tired of pumpkins and Santa."

Squirrel's New Year's Resolution has also been reviewed by School Library Journal, Horn Book Guides Kirkus Reviews, and Library Media Connection.

It is a 2013 Washington Children's Choice Picture Book Award Nominee
