= A Kingdom Strange =

2010 book

- Author: James Horn
- Genre: Non-fiction
- Published: 2010
- Publisher: Basic Books

A Kingdom Strange: The Brief and Tragic History of the Lost Colony of Roanoke is a book by James Horn about the Roanoke Colony. It was published by Basic Books in 2010.

== Synopsis ==
The book is a history of the Roanoke Colony established by Walter Raleigh. It investigates its disappearance after 1587 and concludes that some of the vanished colonists likely intermarried with and assimilated into Native American tribes, while others were killed by the Powhatan Indians.

== Reception ==
The book received mostly positive reviews from critics.

Kirkus Reviews wrote that "The author creates an engaging, you-are-there feel to the narrative, with rich descriptions of European politics, colonists’ daily struggles and the vagaries of relations between Native American tribes." Chuck Leddy of The Christian Science Monitor wrote that "Horn has done a magnificent job of researching the mystery of England’s “lost” colony, crafting a compelling narrative that places the luckless settlers in the middle of a global, imperial struggle between Spain and England." Publishers Weekly called it "an outstanding historical mystery/adventure tale with an ending perhaps less tragic than historians have long believed."

Doug Childers, in a review for the Richmond Times-Dispatch, called it "enthralling", "well researched and compelling". Nate Probasco, writing for the Sixteenth Century Journal, concluded that "Horn puts forth a fresh take on their fate and presents an intriguing resolution to one of the great mysteries of early English America."

Drew DeSilver of The Seattle Times gave the book a mixed review, criticizing its reliance on speculation and lack of original theories. DeSilver wrote that "If you want a fast-paced tale of greed, adventure and tragedy that distills pretty much all that is known and most of what is surmised about the Lost Colony, this is a perfectly fine book." Barry M. Stentiford in History: Reviews of New Books similarly noted its reliance on assumption and theory.
