= The Flavour Thesaurus =

2010 cookbook

The Flavour Thesaurus: Pairings, recipes and ideas for the creative cook
- Author: Niki Segnit
- Language: English
- Genre: Cookery
- Published: 2010 (Bloomsbury)
- Publication place: England
- Media type: Print (Hardback)
- Pages: 401
- ISBN: 9780747599777
- OCLC: 501396996

The Flavour Thesaurus: Pairings, recipes and ideas for the creative cook is a 2010 cookery book by Niki Segnit. It discusses 99 flavours divided into 16 categories and combined into 4851 pairings.

The book was unusual for its time, published in a period when cookbooks were occupied with questions of food origins and seasonality. Following strong sales, Segnit was commissioned by The Times to write a weekly column.

== Reception ==
The Guardian called The Flavour Thesaurus a "superb book", writing "As you cannot write with scientific objectivity about taste without risking dullness... the best approach is anecdotal, and this is where Segnit's book is elevated beyond mere usefulness to delight – she doesn't always give recipes with her entries, but when she does they are both simple and inspirational." The Independent listed it amongst the best books for Christmas 2010, called it "Original and prodigious in range", and wrote "its recondite market (cooks drawn to outré combinations) has been broadened with lively writing, but the section on oysters is more fallible than might be expected from a reference work."

The Flavour Thesaurus has also been reviewed by The Sunday Times, Foodtripper, Good, Library Journal, Booklist, Michigan Quarterly Review, and The Globe and Mail.

In addition to the UK and US editions, The Flavour Thesaurus has been translated into fourteen languages, including French, Russian and Japanese. To avoid alienating an American audience, some descriptions were rewritten for the US edition, such as that of black pudding.

== Awards ==
- 2010 British Book Design and Production Awards: Best Jacket/Cover Design - winner
- 2010 André Simon Food Book of the Year - winner
- 2010 Galaxy National Book Awards: Tesco Food & Drink Book of the Year - shortlist
- 2011 Jeremy Round Award for Best First Book - winner
