= Johnnie Walters =

Canadian television host (1933–2023)

John Leigh (Johnnie) Walters
- Born: February 24, 1933; Beamsville, Ontario
- Died: February 26, 2023 (aged 90); Kitchener, Ontario
- Occupation: Broadcaster
- Spouse: Jackie (1958—2021, her death)
- Children: 2
- Parent(s): John Walters ( - 1978), Irene Walters née Zarah Petri (~1911-2008)

John Leigh "Johnnie" Walters (February 24, 1933 — February 26, 2023) was a Canadian broadcaster and television personality known for his on-air improvisation and sense of humour. He is best known for his long affiliation with CKCO-TV in Kitchener, Ontario.

He was born in Beamsville, Ontario to Hungarian-born Irene Walters and German-born John Walters, and had two brothers. When he was 17, he started working at radio stations around southwestern Ontario. While working in London, Ontario, he met Jackie Barnes, the station's music librarian, marrying in 1958.

He was offered work in the United States when the president of Metromedia's Cleveland station was driving through Toronto and heard Walters DJing on CKEY. He was offered a job at WHK-AM and settled in Cleveland where the couple's two daughters were born. He was a disc jockey WHK from 1959 to 1965 and also hosted a television pop music show on WEWS-TV. In 1965, he moved to Cincinnati to co-host a daily afternoon show on WLW-TV with Vivian Della Chiesa that was syndicated on several other stations until 1968 when the show was cancelled and replaced with The Phil Donahue Show.

From 1969 to 1973 he was at KTVI in St. Louis where he hosted Dialing for Dollars and The Big Money Movie. According to Harold Ramis in Dave Thomas's book, SCTV: Behind The Scenes, the SCTV "Dialing For Dollars" spoofs were based on the show of that name hosted by Walters.

Walters was considered for hosting The Newlywed Game but the couple decided to move back to southern Ontario to be close to family.

Walters joined CKCO-TV as the host of Horoscope Dollars from 1974 to 1976, a low-budget show featuring Walters calling area residents at random with a question, the correct answer to which depended on them viewing that particular show. Some of the most entertaining moments came during the time spent dialing and waiting for numbers to connect, as he engaged in informal banter with offscreen crew and organist Pat Ludwig.

From 1976 to 1981, Walters hosted The Johnnie Walters Show, an hour-long weekday morning program featuring guests, an exercise segment, horoscopes, and a cooking segment. Later, he joined a mid-weekday news/information program with Betty Thompson (Miss Betty from CKCO's Romper Room) and Bill Inkol (CKCO sports director).

Walters hosted Tempo Ontario from 1981 to 1982 and Trivia Company on CKCO from 1983 to 1987 . This half-hour show was done in a game show format, and featured Walters taking a mobile unit on the street asking various people trivia questions for cash prizes that were often accompanied by a "Certificate of Genius". On the latter was written a brief but grandiloquent speech, read on-air by the prize-winner, which proclaimed them "A genius, and certainly not a jerk." Walters frequently reacted exuberantly whenever contestants indicated they might have an inkling of what the answer might be (and sometimes even when they didn't), bellowing his catchphrase, "This guy (or lady) knows the answer!" stentoriously to draw in passersby to the spectacle in front of the camera. The show was revived in 1992 by CFPL-TV in London and CFTO-TV in Toronto and finished production in 1994.

He also hosted Morning Magazine on CKCO from 1987 to 1994. Walters was also an occasional fill-in weatherman on the late edition of CKCO news, becoming one of those who wore the classic CKCO red jacket.

In 2010, Walters published a memoir about his mother titled A Very Capable Life: The Autobiography of Zarah Petri, which won the 2010 Edna Staebler Award for creative non-fiction.
