= Pope Francis: Conversations with Jorge Bergoglio =

2013 biography of Pope Francis by Sergio Rubin

Pope Francis: Conversations with Jorge Bergoglio: His Life in His Own Words
- Cover of the original 2010 edition
- Author: Sergio Rubin
- Original title: El Jesuita
- Subject: Jorge Mario Bergoglio
- Genre: Biography
- Publication date: 2010 (re-published 2013)
- Publication place: Argentina

Pope Francis: Conversations with Jorge Bergoglio: His Life in His Own Words is a biography of Jorge Bergoglio, who became Pope Francis in 2013. Written by Sergio Rubin, it is the only biography of him that appeared before his election as Pope. It was initially published in Spanish under the name El Jesuita (Spanish: The Jesuit).

== Creation ==
Sergio Rubin developed the idea in a conversation with Francesca Ambrogetti following the Papal conclave of 2005 that elected Pope Benedict XVI. At that time, media reports based on an anonymous diary of a participant in the conclave said that Bergoglio had received 40 votes in the third ballot.

Bergoglio first resisted the idea of a book about him, but gave in to their continued requests. Rubin and Ambrogetti met with him monthly for a year and half. Those meetings were the only occasions when Bergoglio discussed his life during Argentina's Dirty War.

The book was published in 2010. It was reprinted in 2013, an updated reflection of the increased interest on Bergoglio after his election as Pope.
