= Joker One =

2009 article by Donovan Campbell

- Author: Donovan Campbell
- Genre: Memoir
- Publisher: Random House
- Publication date: 2009

Joker One: A Marine Platoon's Story of Courage, Leadership, and Brotherhood is a memoir by Donovan Campbell, published by Random House in 2009. It is an account of Campbell's time as an infantry officer in the United States Marine Corps, focusing primarily on his 2004 deployment in Ramadi during the Iraq War.

The book is named after the platoon Campbell commanded, the 1st Platoon Company G (also known as "Golf Company"), 2nd Battalion, 4th Marine Regiment, known by its radio call sign, Joker One. Joker One arrived in Iraq in the early spring of 2004, and "counted around 40 dudes: country boys and smalltown jocks; a few Hispanics and a single black. Some were college men with futures; some had pasts they preferred to forget. The battalion was assigned to one of Iraq’s worst hot spots: the city of Ramadi, where faceless enemies found shelter among 350,000 Iraqi civilians. Joker One fought from street to street, house to house and ambush to ambush for seven straight months."

In his review for Leatherneck, Robert B. Loring notes:

"In early 2004, the Marines of “Golf” Co took over the city’s pacification and protection duties from the U.S. Army. The leathernecks aggressively patrolled the city streets and crowded alleyways. In the ensuing months the company did well, improving the tense relationships with the city’s Sunni population. Campbell writes, 'My job description was twofold: 1) save lives and 2) take lives.' In time, Ramadi earned the title of Iraq’s most dangerous place; however, the day-to-day struggle for the city soon was overshadowed by two headline-grabbing battles in another Sunni-dominated city: Fallujah.

Campbell’s book centers on leading his 40-man platoon in combat. His prose vividly highlights his thinking process and the actions of his Marines. The rigors of actively patrolling the city and the constant house-to-house fighting in the face of IEDs, RPGs and AK fire as well as the threat of ambush presented endless challenges. Campbell speaks in detail of the daily tactics to overcome the threats and also the efforts to pacify the populace, gaining the support of the citizenry."
