= The Metropolis Case =

- Front cover of hardcover edition.
- Author: Matthew Gallaway
- Language: English
- Genre: Novel
- Publisher: Crown Publishing Group
- Publication date: December 28, 2010
- Publication place: United States
- Media type: Print (hardback)
- Pages: 372 (hardcover)
- ISBN: 978-0-307-46342-5 (hardcover)
- OCLC: 503042036
- Dewey Decimal: 813'.6 dc22
- LC Class: PS3607A415515M48 2010

The Metropolis Case is the debut novel of American author Matthew Gallaway. The novel follows the interconnected lives of four characters living in different cities, all of whom have a great passion for Richard Wagner's opera Tristan und Isolde. The New York Times said "the book is so well written ... and filled with such memorable lead and supporting players that it quickly absorbs you into its worlds." In the Washington Post, Eugenia Zukerman wrote that "Gallaway has taken a great risk ... by creating an intricate, multilayered tale that slides from past to present, from Europe to New York, from opera to pop. But despite the complexity, The Metropolis Case engages the reader emotionally on every page."

Rather than a conventional narrative, the novel presents alternating chapters devoted to each of the four principal characters. Three of them are opera singers. One of the four lives in the nineteenth century. Two are much younger than the others. The author slowly reveals their shared relationship to Wagner's opera.

The novel's title and some other details allude to Janáček's opera The Makropulos Case.

Gallaway is a graduate of New York University School of Law, member of rock band Saturnine (originally known as Saturnine 60), and a native of Pittsburgh, where the novel is partially set. He began the novel in 2001 and completed it in 2007. According to Gallaway, who blogged as The Gay Recluse from 2007 to 2009:

I only really started to understand why I wrote the novel after I finished it in 2007. I felt that the gay voice was missing from the modern American literary canon and, rather than complain about that vacuum, I decided I should try to fill it myself.

In 2010, when Crown Publishing Group published the novel, Gallaway was employed as a Senior Acquisitions Editor in the legal department of Oxford University Press.
