= Love, A Rather Bad Idea =

2010 novel by Anirban Mukherjee

- First edition
- Author: Anirban Mukherjee
- Language: English
- Genre: Fiction
- Publisher: Srishti Publishers, New Delhi
- Publication date: 2010
- Publication place: India
- Media type: Print (Paperback and Hardcover)
- Pages: 220
- ISBN: 978-93-8034-904-6

Love, a Rather Bad Idea is a 2010 novel written by Anirban Mukherjee, an alumnus of IIT Delhi and IIM Calcutta. It is a contemporary take on the young Indian graduate student. Set against the dazzle of the college festival at IIT Delhi, the book uses humor to bring out the various facets of student life and the related trade offs around aspirations, career, friendship and social belonging.

== Synopsis ==
The story is about Samar Pratap, a quirky, ambitious and popular student at IIT Delhi. He and his band of friends – Skimpy, Jiya and Pranav – together live an upbeat life on campus. While Jiya is the college heart-throb, Pranav is the sports head with a righteous outlook to things and Skimpy, son of rich NRI parents, has a charmed existence full of creative plans to woo his dream girl. Their interaction with each other and other members of the IIT campus brings out many interesting, poignant and hilarious moments.

In due course of time the inevitable institute politics enters their lives as Samar is picked as the frontrunner for the top job on campus. The ensuing dilemmas threaten to break up their friendship and tosses up some difficult choices for Samar and his friends.

The book is Anirban Mukherjee's first novel and is largely based on his experiences during his stay at IIT Delhi and IIM Calcutta.
