= Amanda Castro =

Honduran poet

- Born: Amanda Lizet Castro Mitchel; October 12, 1962; Tegucigalpa, Honduras
- Died: March 18, 2010 (aged 47); Tegucigalpa, Honduras
- Education: University of Pittsburgh (MA, PhD)
- Occupations: Poet, academic, activist
- Writing career
- Language: Spanish
- Genre: Poetry
- Notable works: Celebración de mujeres Quizás la sangre Poemas de amor propio y de propio amor Onironautas
- Notable awards: Hoja del Laurel en Oro (2008); I Premio Hibueras de Relato Corto (2006)

Amanda Lizet Castro Mitchel (12 October 1962 – 18 March 2010), known as Amanda Castro, was a Honduran poet, academic, and activist. She was the author of several poetry collections and works of literary criticism, including Celebración de mujeres, Quizás la sangre, Poemas de amor propio y de propio amor, and Onironautas. After completing graduate studies at the University of Pittsburgh, she pursued an academic career in the United States while remaining active in Honduran literary and feminist circles. Castro was an advocate for women's rights, labour rights, and LGBT rights, and received the Hoja del Laurel en Oro in 2008.

== Early life and education ==
Amanda Castro was born on 12 October 1962 in Tegucigalpa, Honduras. She attended the Colegio Sagrado Corazón as a child, and later studied at the Escuela Normal Mixta de Tegucigalpa, where teaching became her first vocation. She was qualified as a teacher of both primary and secondary education.

Castro began writing poetry at the age of twelve, producing short vignettes based on scenes she observed from the school bus – laborers, women preparing tortillas, and children asking for food – which gave her an early awareness of class differences. As a teenager she became associated with the visual artists of the Taller Dante Lazaroni in Tegucigalpa, writing stories and poems based on the work of painters such as Víctor López, Aníbal Cruz, Ezequiel Padilla and Virgilio Guardiola.

In 1985 Castro left Honduras for the United States to undertake graduate studies; she would later describe the move as motivated in part by social and religious intolerance toward her sexual orientation. She completed a master's degree in Spanish linguistics at the University of Pittsburgh in 1988, with a thesis on the poetry of Juan Ramón Molina, and subsequently a doctorate in philosophy with a specialty in Latin American sociolinguistics at the same institution.

== Academic career ==
From 1985 onward Castro resided in the United States, where she worked as a university lecturer. She combined her teaching with the promotion of literary and artistic work by women, presenting papers at international academic conferences and publishing studies and anthologies on Central American women writers.

In 1994 she was diagnosed with a terminal pulmonary illness and was given a life expectancy of approximately five years; according to her own statements, the diagnosis transformed both her writing and her engagement with public life. In 2001 she retired on a disability pension from Colorado State University, where she had been teaching, and began returning to Honduras on a regular basis.

== Literary work ==
Her works include Celebración de Mujeres, Quizás la sangre, Poemas de amor propio y de propio amor, Una vez un barco, Pronombres de tratamiento en el español hondureño, La otra cara del sol, and Viajes y sueños: reflexiones sobre creación e identidad y Otros testimonios: voces de mujeres centroamericanas. She also inspired the French novelist Thibaut Viné.

Her work appeared in newspapers and journals in Central America, Europe and the United States, and was translated into English and included in bilingual anthologies published in the United States.

In interviews, Castro identified Onironautas (2001) as her most ambitious book, describing it as an effort to recover what she regarded as her Indigenous roots and to articulate a critique of cultural violence in Honduras through shamanic and mythical motifs. She presented Quizás la sangre as the work in which she came out publicly as a lesbian through her poetry, after years of writing in which her addressee – frequently figured as Honduras itself – had been read as merely allegorical. In 2006 she received the I Premio Hibueras de Relato Corto in Honduras for a short prose work with lesbian and erotic themes.

== Activism ==
Castro was a self-identified lesbian, feminist and pacifist, and an advocate for the labor rights of Honduran women, in particular those employed in the country's maquiladora assembly plants. She was active in the Asociación Nacional de Escritoras de Honduras (ANDEH) and in the Feministas en Resistencia (FER), and devoted the final months of her life to opposing the June 2009 military coup against president Manuel Zelaya. Commentators have placed her among the figures who shaped the post-coup generation of Honduran cultural resistance. On 12 March 2010, shortly before her death, the Feministas en Resistencia and the Red Lésbica Cattrachas held a public tribute in her honour in Tegucigalpa.

== Illness and death ==
For roughly the last twelve years of her life Castro suffered from a terminal pulmonary disease, which in her final years required her to carry a portable oxygen tank.

She died in Tegucigalpa on 18 March 2010 at the age of 47.

Following her death, the Feministas en Resistencia issued a formal statement of mourning recognising her contribution to Honduran women's poetry and to the broader struggle for women's rights and democratic reform.

== Awards ==
- 1993 – First Prize for Poetry at the 56th Certamen de Juegos Florales de México, Centroamérica y el Caribe, held in Quetzaltenango, Guatemala, for Celebración de mujeres.
- 2006 – I Premio Hibueras de Relato Corto, Honduras.
- 2008 – Hoja del Laurel en Oro, awarded by the government of Honduras.
