= The Rise of Renegade X =

2010 novel by Chelsea M. Campbell

- First edition
- Author: Chelsea M. Campbell
- Language: English
- Genre: Young adult novel
- Published: May 11, 2010
- Publisher: EgmontUSA
- ISBN: 9781606840603
- Followed by: The Trials of Renegade X

The Rise of Renegade X is a young adult novel written by Chelsea M. Campbell. It was originally published by Egmont USA and later republished by Golden City Publishing. The first book in the Renegade X series, it chronicles the adventures of Damien Locke, a teen supervillain whose evil plans are ruined when he discovers his long-lost father is actually a good-deed doing superhero.

== Reception ==
The Rise of Renegade X has been reviewed by Publishers Weekly, that called it a "solid debut", and "a witty tale", School Library Journal. Horn Book Guides, and The Bulletin of the Center for Children's Books,
