= What Was Before =

2010 novel by Martin Mosebach

- Author: Martin Mosebach
- Original title: Was davor geschah
- Translator: Kári Driscoll
- Language: German
- Publisher: Carl Hanser Verlag
- Publication date: 2010
- Publication place: Germany
- English publication date: 2014
- Pages: 329
- ISBN: 978-3-446-23562-5

What Was Before (German: Was davor geschah) is a 2010 novel by the German writer Martin Mosebach. Through a series of vignettes, it tells the story of a man from the affluent suburbs of Frankfurt, who is asked by his girlfriend what his life was like before they met. An English translation by Kári Driscoll was published in 2014.

== Reception ==
Publishers Weekly wrote: "Mosebach's charming, exuberant narrator is not be trusted, and the novel calls into question our notions of memory. Mosebach's writing is florid, tinged with a biting wit. ... Irreverent, playful, and intricate, Mosebach's book is a deconstruction of how we choose to tell stories."
