= Sergio Rubin =

Argentine journalist and writer

Sergio Rubin is an Argentine journalist and writer. He is the authorized biographer of Pope Francis, and wrote his only biography available at the time of his election, in March 2013.

He currently works at Argentine newspaper Clarín as a columnist covering news related to the Catholic Church and Pope Francis.

== Biography ==
Graduated from the University of Navarra (Universidad de Navarra), Rubin started his journalism career at Argentine newspaper Clarin in the 1980s, covering news related to the Catholic Church. He conducted several interviews to many important figures of the Church such as Mother Teresa and, sent by Clarin, covering many of Pope John Paul II's journeys all around the world.

He later joined religious Argentine journal, subsidiary of Clarin, Valores Religiosos, as a columnist. He is currently the director.

Rubin met Jorge Bergoglio in 1990, while conducting interviews with Buenos Aires city Archbishop Antonio Quarracino. He wrote El jesuita, the first biography of Jorge Bergoglio, in 2010. Along with Italian journalist Francesca Ambrogetti, he decided to write the biography when Bergoglio got 40 votes at the 2005 Papal conclave, the highest number of votes ever obtained by a Latin American considered to be papabile.

In 2001, he was awarded the Santa Clara de Asis trophy.

He attended the 2013 Papal conclave along with 5,600 other journalists. Bergoglio was elected as Pope, and as his biographer, Rubín suddenly became highly requested for interviews by international media.

In September 2015, Rubin, alongside colleague Nelson Castro, were sent by Clarin to cover the Pope's journey over the United States, Cuba and Philadelphia.

In February 2016, he was sent by Clarin to cover the Pope's new journey
