= George Cain =

African-American novelist (1943-2010)

George Cain (October 27, 1943 – October 23, 2010) was an African-American man well-known for writing Blueschild Baby, a semi-autobiographical novel published in 1970. The book is about the life of a drug user who finally overcomes his addiction. Cain was himself a drug user but, unlike the character in his novel, he never overcame his addiction nor went on to write another book.

Born on October 27, 1943, as George Maurice Hopkins, he would adopt the pen name Africa Cain, later choosing to use his original first name. He grew up in Hell's Kitchen, Manhattan and moved with his family to Teaneck, New Jersey after graduating from the McBurney School, which he attended on scholarship. His basketball skills earned him a scholarship at Iona College, but he dropped out as a junior and headed to the American Southwest. While in Mexico he was charged and sentenced to six months in jail for possession of marijuana.

After completing his sentence he moved to Brooklyn and started writing Blueschild Baby. George Cain's representative character in the book starts using drugs in high school, which starts his descent into the drug world, following the death of a favorite grandmother in a fire. The George Cain in the book finally finds his way and stops using drugs, but Cain himself had his life destroyed by drugs. The book describes how Cain's middle-class parents moving to the suburbs only to find themselves "surrounded, hounded and harassed by the white mob". Reviewer Addison Gayle, Jr., of The New York Times called the book "the most important work of fiction by an Afro-American since Native Son", describing "a world that only black people can fully comprehend", written in "a language that abounds in colorful in-group symbols and metaphors".

Despite favorable responses to the book, he never completed a planned sequel to his debut book and as described by his ex-wife Jo Lynne Pool he "had a lot of friends from the street, and they were going down", and he went down along with them, his life and family falling apart.

Cain died at the age of 66 on October 23, 2010, in Manhattan due to complications of kidney disease. He was survived by two daughters, a son and five grandchildren.
