= A Very Capable Life =

2010 memoir by John Leigh Walters

A Very Capable Life: The Autobiography of Zarah Petri
- First edition cover of Canadian release
- Author: John Leigh Walters
- Subject: Immigration
- Genre: Non-fiction, memoir
- Publisher: Athabasca University Press
- Publication date: January 1, 2010
- Publication place: Canada
- Media type: Print (Hardcover & Paperback)
- Pages: 197 pp.
- ISBN: 9781897425411

A Very Capable Life: The Autobiography of Zarah Petri is a non-fiction memoir of his mother by the Canadian television host Johnnie Walters, written under his real name John Leigh Walters and published in January 2010 by Athabasca University Press. It re-tells the stories his mother described to him regarding her immigration to Canada in the 1920s. Walters gives his first person account using humor, and intrigue, to share his mother's expressed regards about her depression era experiences.

== Awards and honours ==
A Very Capable Life won the 2010 "Edna Staebler Award for Creative Non-Fiction".

== See also ==
- List of Edna Staebler Award recipients
