= Mother's Day Surprise =

Children's picture book by Stephen Krensky

- Author: Stephen Krensky
- Illustrator: Kathi Ember
- Language: English
- Genre: Children's Picture book
- Published: 2010 (Marshall Cavendish)
- Publication place: USA
- Media type: Print (hardback)
- Pages: 32 (unpaginated)
- ISBN: 9780761456339
- OCLC: 310171818

Mother's Day Surprise is a 2010 children's picture book by Stephen Krensky and illustrated by Kathi Ember. It is about Violet, a snakelet who, upon seeing other young animals making and gathering gifts to give to their mothers on Mother's Day, is initially unsure what she, without arms, legs or teeth (she does have a pair of cute fangs) can give. Happily, Violet works out what she can do, and on the day contorts herself into the shape of a love heart, much to the delight of her mother.

== Reception ==
Mother's Day Surprise received mixed reviews. Kirkus Reviews wrote "While it’s clear that Krensky needs a snake for the plot’s payoff, by sacrificing everything behavioral that makes a snake a snake, he takes all possible zing out of his story. Ember’s illustrations are equally pallid..". Publishers Weekly wrote "Violet's goofy dinosaur looks are a quirky contrast to Ember's buoyant springtime forest, where the woodsier animals look more at home," and Booklist found it "Ideal for both mothers and the kids who love them, this sweet story about resourcefulness strikes a happy balance of sentiment and satisfaction."

Mother's Day Surprise has also been reviewed by Horn Book Guides and School Library Journal.
