= Jane Springer =

American poet

- Born: Lawrenceburg, Tennessee, U.S.
- Occupation: Poet
- Education: Florida State University (PhD)
- Notable awards: Whiting Award (2010)

Jane Springer (born Lawrenceburg, Tennessee) is an American poet. Her honors include a 2010 Whiting Award, the Robert Penn Warren Prize for Poetry, and the Beatrice Hawley Award from Alice James Books.

== Life ==
She graduated from Florida State University with a PhD in creative writing. She is associate professor of Literature and Creative Writing at Hamilton College.

She was a National Endowment for the Arts Fellow and her first book, Dear Blackbird, won the 2006 Agha Shahid Ali Prize. Her work appeared in AGNI, Sycamore Review, and Poetry.

Poet Lynnell Edwards, reviewing her second collection, Murder Ballad, noted, "Springer's long line is fearless in its music, indulging luscious sounds and pounding measures. Traversing the despair of the rural south, [she] exploits the urgency and dread of every keening murder ballad, showing how that cleaving is both our undoing and our salvation."

== Works ==
- Dear Blackbird, University of Utah Press, 2007
- Murder Ballad, Alice James Books, May 2012
