= Gilda O'Neill =

British novelist and historian

Gilda O'Neill (25 May 1951 – 24 September 2010) was a British novelist and historian, particularly of the local history of the East End of London.

A British novelist and historian, born in Bethnal Green in 1951, O’Neill's writing focussed on the East End of London where she grew up. She wrote 5 social histories including the Penguin best-seller My East End: Memories of Life in Cockney London (1999), and 14 novels that she relished were often printed in large type aiming at senior audiences.

Gilda was also a regular pundit on radio programmes about London with the likes of Danny Baker and Robert Elms . Curtis Brown in a Guardian article following her death, commented: "Her works of oral history were held in high regard and widely read“. Elms made similar comments live on air, also suggesting “she was one of our finest contributors”.

Education as a mature student gave Gilda many wonderful opportunities to learn, and she wanted to inspire the next generation of mature students particularly towards oral history - primarily to encourage alternative voices.” After her death the Gilda Street Trust was set up and between 2010 and 2025 it used Gilda's royalties to fund young historians producing oral histories for On the Record such as Holding the Baby (2017–18) interviews and podcasts, as well as oral history about the Weavers Adventure Playground (2022–23) amongst other projects that featured on the Gilda Street Website, as well as listing Gilda's books, the website also hosted advice as to where to find simple oral history methods for non academic members of the community who wanted to have a go.

The Gilda Street Trust will cease in 2025.

== Publications ==
- Pull no more bines (1990). Women's Press. Reissued by Penguin as Lost Voices – Memories of a Vanished Way of Life
- A Night Out With the Girls – Women Having A Good Time (1993), The Women's Press
- My East End: Memories of Life in Cockney London (2000), Penguin UK, ISBN 0-14-025950-3
- Our Street: East End Life in the Second World War (2004), Penguin UK, ISBN 0-14-100046-5 (paperback)
- The Good Old Days: Crime, Murder and Mayhem in Victorian London (2006), Penguin UK
- East End Tales (Quick Reads) for The National Reading Campaign (2008) ISBN 0-14-103494-7

== Novels ==
- The Cockney Girl (1992)
- Whitechapel Girl (1993)
- The Bells of Bow (1994)
- Just Around the Corner (1995)
- Cissie Flowers (1996) - (Reissued as The Flower Girl)
- Dream On (1997)
- The Lights of London (1998)
- Playing Around (2000)
- Getting There (2001)
- The Belts and Bow (2001)
- The Sins of Their Fathers (2002)
- Make Us Traitors (2003)
- Of Woman Born (2005) ISBN 0-09-942747-8
- Rough Justice (2007)
- Secrets of the Heart (2008)

== Personal life ==
O'Neill was born in Bethnal Green.

Gilda left school at 15 with no qualifications, worked at various jobs before marrying John O’Neill in 1971, and after bringing up two children in Essex, she returned to education as a mature student. She eventually gained two degrees, from the Open University and East London Polytechnical as well as an MA from the University of Kent before becoming a full-time published writer in 1990. Her first book Pull No More Bines (1990 The Women's press ) a study of hop picking in Kent reached new audiences (reissued by Penguin in 2006 as Lost Voices) perhaps because Gilda was able to write about working class history with feeling, developing a popular voice that demonstrated a sophisticated understanding of ordinary lives . Her first novel, The Cockney Girl (1992), drew on her family experience, but combined it with careful historical research, that was also a feature of the crime novels she wrote in later years. The Sins of Their Fathers (2002) was the first in a trilogy., which like her other novels focussed on East London.

The grand daughter of a Thames tug skipper and pie and mash shop owner, Gilda's experience of life, and her empathy for others, influenced her use of storytelling, lived experience and memory to draw political parallels in her writing. Gilda supported many causes including the UK National Literacy Campaign. In 2002 Gilda received an honorary doctorate from East London University in recognition of her contribution to history. In 2008, she joined the National Reading Campaign, where she contributed a new book, East End Tales (2008), a collection of easy-to-read childhood memories, to the campaign. Gilda was a speaker and regular contributor to bookshop events, particularly at activities at the Newham Bookshop that prides itself on community engagement.

She died on 24 September 2010 of multiple organ failure caused by alcoholic liver disease.

Her son Jeremy died by suicide in Thailand in 2013. He was 37 and drowned in the sea.
