= Ektor Kaknavatos =

Pen name of Greek poet and essayist Yorgis Kontoyorgis (1920–2010)

Ektor Kaknavatos (Greek: Έκτωρ Κακναβάτος) is the pen name of Greek poet and essayist Yorgοs Kontoyorgis (Γιώργος Κοντογιώργης; 1920 – 9 November 2010), who was born in Piraeus, Greece. Between 1937 and 1941, he studied mathematics in Athens. After World War II, he worked as a teacher of mathematics and then as a civil servant in the Ministry of Education.

His first published poetry collection was Fuga in 1943. After 18 years, in 1961, he circulated in a small circle of friends the collection Diaspora (Dissemination).

== Bibliography ==
- Fuga (1943)
- I klimaka tou lithou – Diaspora (1961)
- Tetrapsifio me tin evdomi chordi (1972)
- Diigisi (1974)
- Odos Laistrygonon (1978)
- Ta machairia tis Kirkis (1981)
- Anastixi tou thrylou gia ta nefra tis politeias (1981)
- In perpetuum (1983)
- Kivotio tachytiton (1987)
- Oiakismoi tou Menesthea Kastelanou tou Mystros (1995)
- Chaotika I (1997)
- Ypsikaminizouses neoplasies (2001)
- Akarei (2001)
- Sta proso Iachis (2005)
- Vrachea ke Makra (2005)
- Sfodra airetiko imerologio tou 2000 (in cooperation with Spyros Kaniouras) (1999)
- To klarino i Safari sto verso tou pragmatikou (2005)

=== Collected works ===
- Piimata 1943–1974
- Piimata 1978–1987
