= In Search of My Father =

Memoir by Paul Drexler

- Author: Paul Drexler
- Language: English
- Genre: Autobiography
- Publisher: JoJo Publishing
- Publication date: 2010
- Publication place: Australia
- Media type: Print (Softcover)
- Pages: 221
- ISBN: 978-0-9805185-1-1

In Search of My Father: The Journey of a Child Holocaust Survivor is a 2010 book by a Holocaust survivor Paul Drexler. The book chronicles the author's research about his father's death during a British bombardment days before German capitulation.

== Summary ==
In 1944, Drexler and his family were taken by the Gestapo to a labor camp in Sereď. The family was separated a few months later when Drexler and his mother were sent to the Theresienstadt concentration camp. Drexler never saw his father, Eugen again. The family had evidence that Eugen died on 3 May 1945 in a death certificate, but knew no details. They soon immigrated to Australia.

In the mid 1990s, Drexler was presenting his story to Steven Spielberg's Shoah Foundation. It was during this recounting of events that Drexler realized he wanted to research and discover what happened to his father. His research took him throughout Europe, where he discovered that Eugen was killed in the Bay of Lübeck only a couple days before Germany surrendered.

== Reception ==
The Sydney Morning Herald praised In Search of My Father as "full of powerful moments, told simply, with disturbing openness". A review in The Australian illustrates the book's "painful reminder that when nations go to war, it is invariably the innocent who suffer most".
