= Linda Vero Ban =

Hungarian writer and educationist

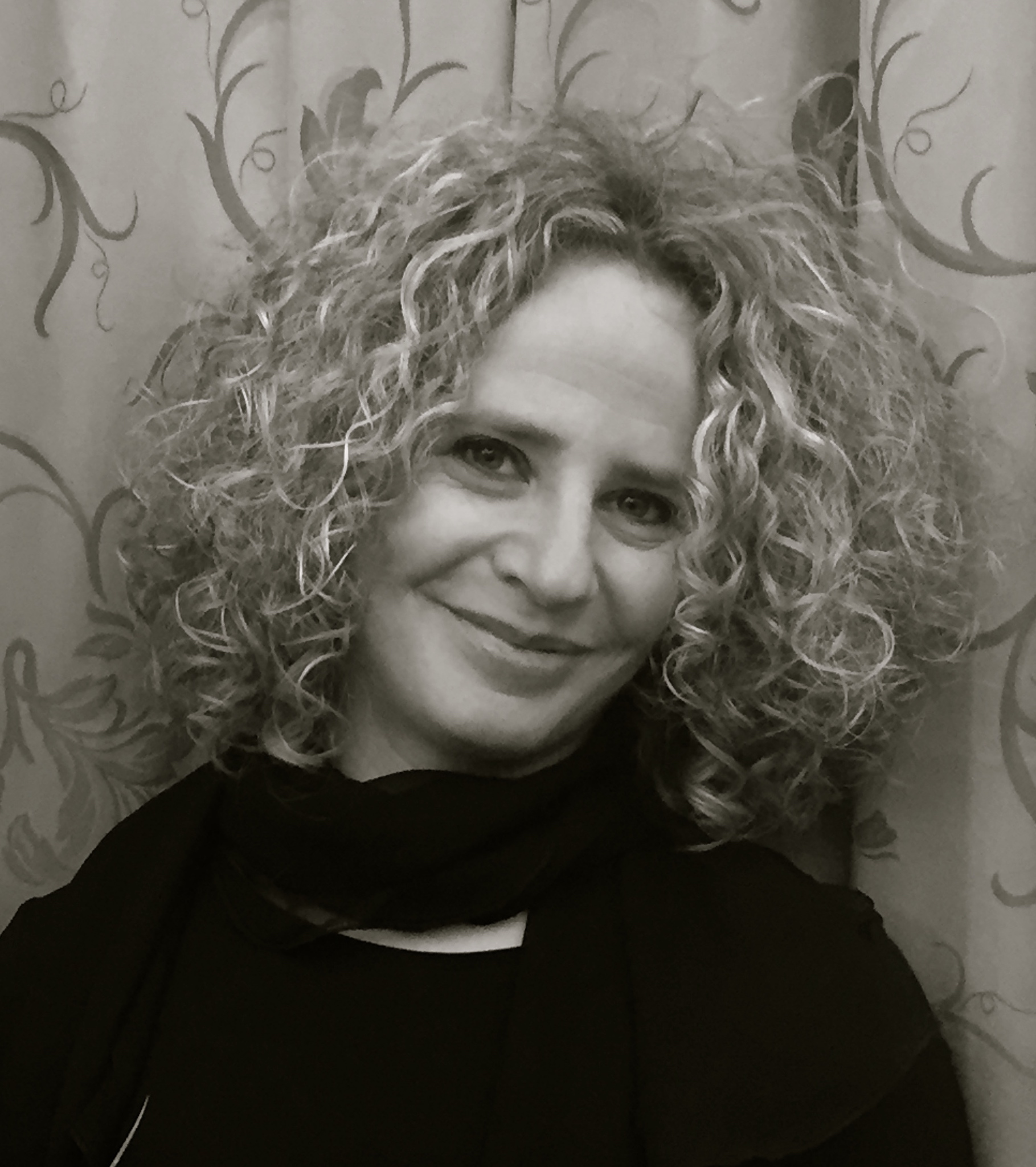
Linda Vero Ban in 2015

Linda Vero Ban (Hungarian: Verő Bán Linda; born 1976) is a Hungarian writer, rebbetzin, and Jewish educator. She was born in Budapest, where she still lives.

== Early life and education ==
Ban was born in 1976 in Budapest into a traditional Jewish family. She has been identified as "among the first to rebuild Jewish life in Budapest, as a teenager after the Communist era," taking a very active part in its revival in Hungary in the 1990s. "You couldn't practice your religion under communism, so it wasn't until after the regime fell that people began trying to recover their identity," she says. "They don't go to synagogue, but they still want to express their Jewish culture," she explained to a journalist in 2013.

Linda Ban graduated at the Hebrew University of Jerusalem in the Art History and General Human Studies Department.

== Early career ==
She worked as a shlicha (agent) of the Masorti Olami movement, then spent a year in the scholarship program of the European Institute of Jewish Studies (Paideia) in Stockholm, Sweden.

== Family and further work ==
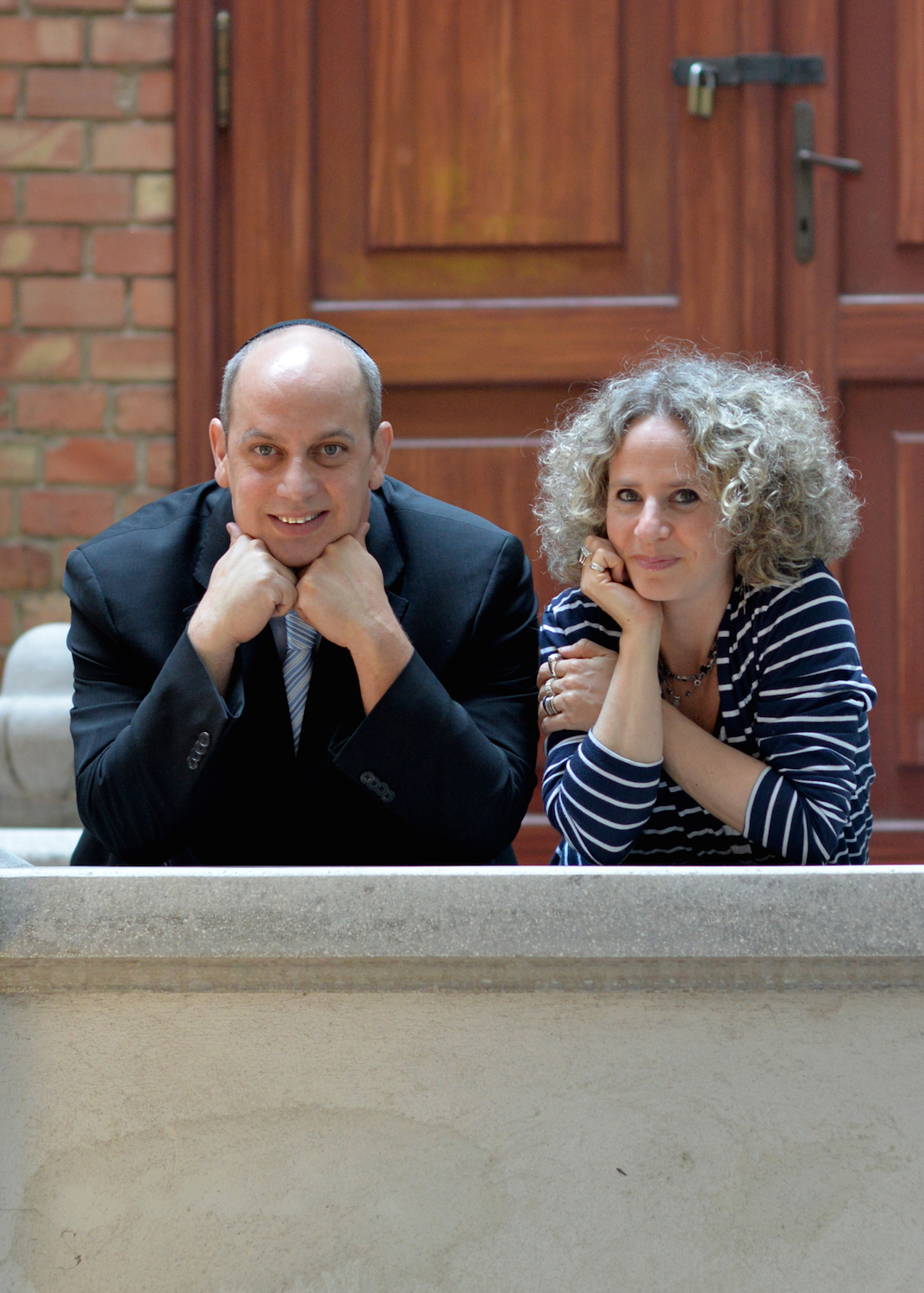
Linda with her husband

In 2002 she married Rabbi Tamás Verő and since then she has been working in informal Jewish education and community building at the Frankel Synagogue in Budapest. There she runs the Sunday School and the Family Kabalat Shabat, and in September 2015 founded BBYO Hungary for young people between the ages of 12 and 16.

== Writing career ==
In the last decade Ban has written and published 13 books for young families about Jewish traditions and identity. These are the first modern educational Jewish children books published in Hungarian since the Shoah. Some of her books have been translated into English and German, Slovak, French, Russian and Croatian.

Ban's "What Does It Mean To Be Jewish?" was singled out for praise as a Jewish book on the Huffington Post, indeed chosen by its blog writer as "Best Jewish Book of 2010."

== Books available in English ==
- What Does It Mean To Be Jewish? ISBN 978-0684842981
- Hello God! – Interactive Jewish Prayer Book for Children ISBN 978-6155204043
- Becca's Family Photos – Jewish Life in Budapest
- Jewish Community Life in Budapest
