= Gus Russo =

American journalist

- Born: 1950 (age 75–76); Baltimore, Maryland
- Occupation: Author
- Known for: Research on the assassination of John F. Kennedy

Gus G. Russo (born 1950 in Baltimore, Maryland) is an American author, journalist, and researcher of the assassination of John F. Kennedy.

Russo was part of a team of researchers that worked on the 1993 Frontline Lee Harvey Oswald documentary, Who Was Lee Harvey Oswald?, for PBS. He is the author of Live by the Sword: The Secret War Against Castro and the Death of JFK, a book which states that Lee Harvey Oswald alone killed the president in retribution for Kennedy's policies toward Fidel Castro and Cuba.

Russo has also written books about the Chicago Outfit and mob lawyer Sidney Korshak. In The Outfit, Russo points out that while the Mafia is responsible for heinous crimes, they are not the only "business" that engages in destructive and illegal activities. The Mafia's "upper world" counterparts, big business, has been responsible for many crimes themselves (white collar crime), have escaped punishment, and still operate without being prosecuted.

Co-authored by Stephen Molton, Brothers In Arms: The Kennedys, the Castros, and the Politics of Murder states that Castro's regime employed Oswald in retaliation for plots against the Cuban leader.

== Personal life ==
As of 2013, Russo was a resident of Catonsville, Maryland.

== Books ==
- Live by the Sword: The Secret War Against Castro and the Death of JFK. Bancroft Press. 1998. ISBN 978-1890862985.
- The Outfit: The Role of Chicago's Underworld in the Shaping of Modern America. Bloomsbury USA. 2003. ISBN 978-1582342795.
- Gangsters and Goodfellas: The Mob, Witness Protection, and Life on the Run, as told by Henry Hill (2004)
- Supermob: How Sidney Korshak and His Criminal Associates Became America's Hidden Power Brokers. Bloomsbury USA. 2006. ISBN 978-1582343891.
- (with Stephen Molton) Brothers In Arms: The Kennedys, the Castros, and the Politics of Murder. Bloomsbury. 2008. ISBN 978-1596915329.
- Boomer Days. 2011. ISBN 978-1461031512.
