= Jay Feinman =

American legal scholar

Jay M. Feinman
- Born: January 22, 1951 (age 75); Easton, Pennsylvania, U.S.
- Occupation: Legal scholar
- Title: Distinguished Professor Emeritus

Academic background
- Education: American University (BA); University of Chicago (JD)

Academic work
- Discipline: Private law
- Sub-discipline: Insurance law Tort law Contract law
- Institutions: Rutgers Law School
- Website: law.rutgers.edu/jay-m-feinman

Jay Murray Feinman (born January 22, 1951) is an American legal scholar on private law. He specializes in insurance law, tort law, and contract law. He joined Rutgers Law School faculty in 1977, served as Distinguished Professor of Law from 1996 to 2023, and retired in 2023 as Distinguished Professor Emeritus. He is known by the public for his book Delay, Deny, Defend, published in 2010.

== Early life and education ==
Jay Murray Feinman was born into a Jewish family on January 22, 1951 in Easton, Pennsylvania. He graduated with a Bachelor of Arts summa cum laude with a major in political science from American University in 1972 and a J.D. degree from the University of Chicago Law School in 1975.

== Career ==
From 1975 to 1976, Feinman served as an instructor at the University of Miami School of Law in Coral Gables, Florida. He worked as an associate at Dechert Price and Rhoads in Philadelphia, Pennsylvania, from 1976 to 1977.

Feinman joined the faculty of Rutgers Law School in Camden, New Jersey, in 1977. From 1977 to 1996, he served as assistant professor, associate professor, and full professor. He served as Distinguished Professor of Law from 1996 to 2023. He retired from Rutgers Law School in 2023 under the title of Distinguished Professor Emeritus.

Feinman specializes in insurance law, torts, and contract law. He is the author of seven books and over 60 scholarly articles. He also serves as a member of the American Law Institute and other professional organizations. He has argued against the idea that Americans are too litigious and that there are too many lawyers.

== Books ==
- Law 101: Everything You Need to Know About American Law (Oxford University Press, 2000; sixth edition, 2023)
- Delay, Deny, Defend: Why Insurance Companies Don't Pay Claims and What You Can Do About It (Portfolio/Penguin, 2010; Delden Press, 2013)
- Professional Liability to Third Parties (American Bar Association, 2000; second edition, 2007; third edition, 2013)
- Penguin Civics Classics: Supreme Court Decisions (Penguin, 2012) (editor)
- Un-Making Law: The Conservative Campaign to Roll Back the Common Law (Beacon Press, 2004)
- 1001 Legal Words You Need to Know (Oxford University Press, 2003) (editor)
- Economic Negligence: Liability of Professionals and Businesses to Third Parties for Economic Loss (Little, Brown and Company, 1995)
