= Łucja Okulicz-Kozaryn =

Polish archeologist

Łucja Okulicz-Kozaryn (nee Kunicka, 5 January 1933 - 1999) was a Polish academic and archaeologist specialising in history of Old Prussians. She passed her habilitation in 1976. She gained a title of professor in 1994.

== Biography ==
Kunicka was born on 5 January 1933 in Nowy Sącz. She had been living in Warsaw since 1938, where she graduated primary school and XII Państwowe Żeńskie Gimnazjum i Liceum im. Marii Skłodowskiej-Curie. After passing her matura exam in 1951 she enrolled at the Department of History at the University of Warsaw. She graduated in archeology in 1955. Her thesis about toys discovered in Gdańsk is still considered as a classical archeology publication.

Łucja Okulicz-Kozarayn gained her PhD in 1966.

During the 1970s, her most important academic achievement was the book Osadnictwo strefy wschodniobałtyckiej w I tysiącleciu przed naszą erą. In 1976 she passed her habilitation. She gained a title of professor in 1994. Okulicz-Kozaryn was professor at the Warsaw University since 1996. In 1998 she received Józef Kostrzewski Award.

== Publications ==
- Życie codzienne Prusów i Jaćwięgów w wiekach średnich (IX —XIII w.) (1983)
- Dzieje Prusów (1997)
