= Anna Letitia Le Breton =

English author (1808–1885)

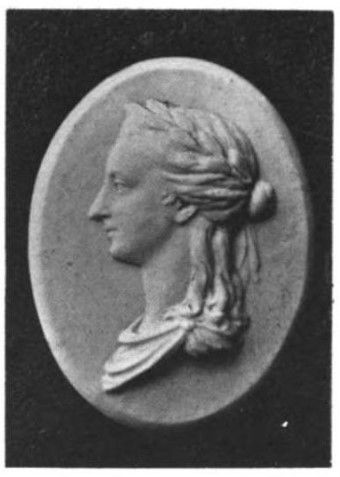
- Portrait of Anna Letitia Le Breton, 1874
- Born: Anna Letitia Aikin; 30 June 1808; London, England
- Died: 29 September 1885 (aged 77); Hampstead, England
- Resting place: Hampstead Cemetery
- Occupation: Author
- Known for: Literary memoirs
- Spouse: Philip Hemery Le Breton (m. 1833; died 1884)
- Children: 8 (including Anna Letitia Roscoe and Lucy Hingeston)
- Relatives: Anna Laetitia Barbauld (great aunt); Lucy Aikin (aunt)

Anna Letitia Le Breton (née Aikin; 30 June 1808 – 29 September 1885) was an English writer. She was best known for publishing the memoirs of her great-aunt, the poet Anna Laetitia Barbauld as well as her aunt, the writer Lucy Aikin.

== Early life and education ==
She was born into a distinguished literary and medical family of prominent Unitarians. Her mother was Anne, daughter of the Rev Gilbert Wakefield. Her father was Charles Rochemont Aikin, a member of the Royal College of Surgeons. He had grown up as the adopted child of his aunt, Anna Laetitia Barbauld, a prominent poet, essayist, literary critic, editor, and children's author; he was educated at the school she ran with her husband, the Palgrave Academy. Charles Rochemont Aikin's father was John Aikin (1747–1822), a medical doctor, historian, and author. His siblings/cousins (Anna Letitia's aunt and uncle) were Lucy Aikin (1781–1864), a historical writer, and Arthur Aikin (1773–1854), a doctor and chemist.

Le Breton was educated at home in London and saw much of her namesake great-aunt and other members of the Aikin family. She had eight children. Her namesake daughter, Anna Letitia, married Francis James Roscoe.

== Career ==
She married, in 1833, Philip Hemery Le Breton, a lawyer of the Inner Temple, born to a Jersey family of clerics, and who was second cousin to actress Lillie Langtry. They lived in Hampstead, then a village outside London, but now part of Inner London. For twenty years he was a member of its vestry.

He chaired the Metropolitan Board of Works parks committee and lobbied successfully with the Commons Preservation Society (now Open Spaces Society) for the preservation of Hampstead Heath.

She assisted her husband in his Memoirs, Miscellanies, and Letters of her aunt Lucy, which was published in 1864. In 1874 she herself edited Lucy Aikin's correspondence with William Ellery Channing, the American Unitarian theologian, and published a Memoir of Mrs. Barbauld, including Letters and Notices of her Family and Friends. In 1883 appeared Le Breton's last book, Memories of Seventy Years, by one of a Literary Family, which was edited by her daughter, Mrs. Herbert Martin.

Widowed in 1884, she died at Hampstead on 29 September 1885, aged 77 and was interred in the cemetery there. Of her eight children that reached maturity, six survived her.
