= Lessons for Children =

1778/79 early reader by Anna Laetitia Barbauld

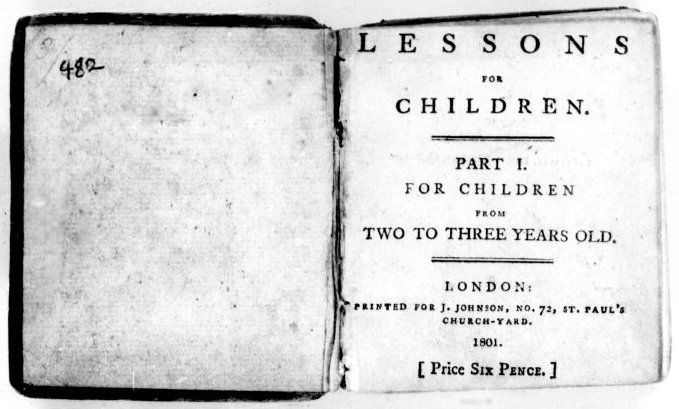
Title page for an 1801 edition of Lessons for Children, part I

Lessons for Children is a series of four age-adapted reading primers written by the prominent 18th-century British poet and essayist Anna Laetitia Barbauld. Published in 1778 and 1779, the books initiated a revolution in children's literature in the Anglo-American world. For the first time, the needs of the child reader were seriously considered: the typographically simple texts progress in difficulty as the child learns. In perhaps the first demonstration of experiential pedagogy in Anglo-American children's literature, Barbauld's books use a conversational style, which depicts a mother and her son discussing the natural world. Based on the educational theories of John Locke, Barbauld's books emphasise learning through the senses.

One of the primary morals of Barbauld's lessons is that individuals are part of a community; in this she was part of a tradition of female writing that emphasised the interconnectedness of society. Charles, the hero of the texts, explores his relationship to nature, to animals, to people, and finally to God.

Lessons had a significant effect on the development of children's literature in Britain and the United States. Maria Edgeworth, Sarah Trimmer, Jane Taylor, and Ellenor Fenn, to name a few of the most illustrious, were inspired to become children's authors because of Lessons and their works dominated children's literature for several generations. Lessons itself was reprinted for over a century. However, because of the disrepute that educational writings fell into, largely due to the low esteem awarded Barbauld, Trimmer, and others by contemporary male Romantic writers, Barbauld's Lessons has rarely been studied by scholars. In fact, it has only been analysed in depth since the 1990s.

== Publication and structure ==
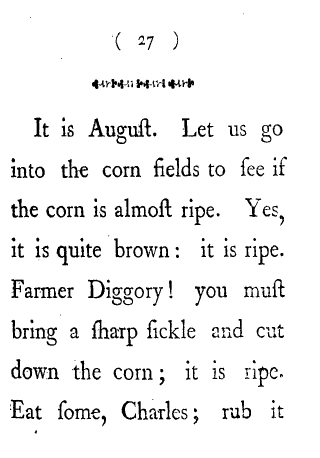
A page from Barbauld's Lessons for Children, part 2, the first part for children of three (1779 Dublin edition); demonstrating wide spacing and large type

Lessons depicts a mother teaching her son. Presumably, many of the events were inspired by Barbauld's experiences of teaching her own adopted son, her nephew Charles, as the events correlate with his age and growth. Although there are no surviving first edition copies of the works, children's literature scholar Mitzi Myers has reconstructed the probable publication dates from Barbauld's letters and the books' earliest reviews as follows: Lessons for Children of two to three (1778); Lessons for Children of three, part I (1778); Lessons for Children of three, part II (1778); and Lessons for Children of three to four (1779).

Barbauld demanded that her books be printed in large type with wide margins, so that children could easily read them; she was more than likely the "originator" of this practice, according to Barbauld scholar William McCarthy, and "almost certainly [its] popularizer". (Note: See also O'Malley, p. 57 and Pickering, p. 146.) In her history of children's literature in The Guardian of Education (1802–1806), Sarah Trimmer noted these innovations, as well as the use of good-quality paper and large spaces between words. While making reading easier, these production changes also made the books too expensive for the children of the poor, therefore Barbauld's books helped to create a distinct aesthetic for the middle-class children's book.

Barbauld's texts were designed for the developing reader, beginning with words of one syllable and progressing to multi-syllabic words. (Note: See also Jackson, p. 129 and Robbins 1993, p. 140.) The first part of Lessons includes simple statements such as: "Ink is black, and papa's shoes are black. Paper is white, and Charles's frock is white." The second part increases in difficulty: "February is very cold too, but the days are longer, and there is a yellow crocus coming up, and the mezereon tree is in blossom, and there are some white snow-drops peeking up their little heads."

Barbauld also "departs from previous reading primers by introducing elements of story, or narrative, piecemeal before introducing her first story". The narrator introduces simpler concepts, which together, make up the more complex story, thus introducing Charles to the concept of "sequentiality" by first reminding him "that he used to be a baby, is now a little boy, and will (when older) have a horse to ride like Papa". Only then is Charles taught the days of the week and months of the year, after which his mother tells him his first story.

== Pedagogical theory ==
Barbauld's Lessons emphasises the value of all kinds of language and literacy; not only do readers learn how to read but they also acquire the ability to understand metaphors and analogies. The fourth volume in particular fosters poetic thinking and as McCarthy points out, its passages on the moon mimic Barbauld's poem "A Summer Evening's Meditation":

Lessons for Children
The Moon says My name is Moon; I shine to give you light in the night when the sun is set.
I am very beautiful and white like silver.
You may look at me always, for I am not so bright as to dazzle your eyes,
and I never scorch you. I am mild and gentle.
I let even the little glow-worms shine, which are quite dark by day.
The stars shine all round me, but I am larger and brighter than the stars,
and I look like a large pearl amongst a great many small sparkling diamonds.
When you are asleep I shine through your curtains with my gentle beams,
and I say Sleep on, poor little tired boy, I will not disturb you.

"A Summer Evening's Meditation"

A tongue in every star that talks with man,
And wooes him to be wise; nor wooes in vain:
This dead of midnight is the noon of thought,
And wisdom mounts her zenith with the stars.
At this still hours the self-collected soul
Turns inward, and beholds a stranger there
Of high descent, and more than mortal rank;
An embryo GOD; a spark of fire divine,
Which must burn on for ages, when the sun,
(Fair transitory creature of a day!)
Has clos'd his golden eye, and wrapt in shades
Forgets his wonted journey thro' the east. (lines 49–60)

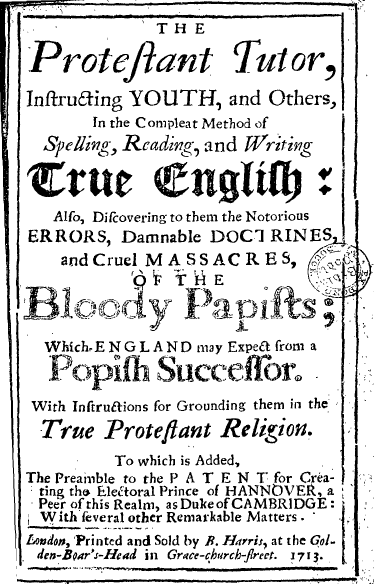
Benjamin Harris's Protestant Tutor, a primer popular for decades and the source for the New England Primer. The typographical layout of Barbauld's predecessors contrasts with her wide margins and large letters in Lessons for Children.

Barbauld also developed a particular style that would dominate British and American children's literature for a generation: an "informal dialogue between parent and child", a conversational style that emphasised linguistic communication. (Note: See also Myers 1995, pp. 270–271.) Lessons starts out monopolised by the mother's voice but slowly, over the course of the volumes, Charles's voice is increasingly heard as he gains confidence in his own ability to read and speak.

Barbauld's Lessons also illustrates mother and child engaging in quotidian activities and taking nature walks. Through these activities, the mother teaches Charles about the world around him and he explores it. This, too, was a challenge to the pedagogical orthodoxy of the day, which did not encourage experiential learning. The mother shows Charles the seasons, the times of the day, and different minerals by bringing him to them rather than simply describing them and having him recite those descriptions. Charles learns the principles of "botany, zoology, numbers, change of state in chemistry ... the money system, the calendar, geography, meteorology, agriculture, political economy, geology, [and] astronomy".

Barbauld's pedagogy was fundamentally based on John Locke's Some Thoughts Concerning Education (1693), the most influential pedagogical treatise in 18th-century Britain. Building on Locke's theory of the Association of Ideas, which he had outlined in Some Thoughts, philosopher David Hartley had developed an associationist psychology that greatly influenced writers such as Barbauld (who had read Joseph Priestley's redaction of it). For the first time, educational theorists and practitioners were thinking in terms of developmental psychology, and as a result, Barbauld and the women writers she influenced produced the first graded texts and the first body of literature designed for an age-specific readership.

== Themes ==
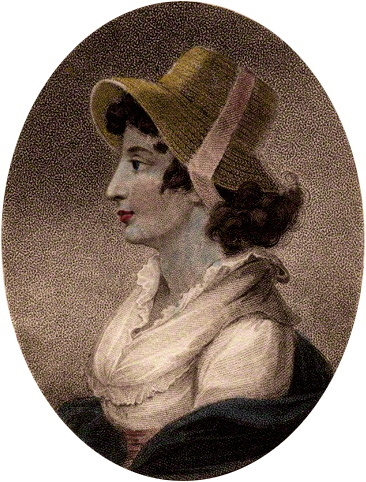
Anna Laetitia Barbauld (1743–1825)

According to scholar William McCarthy, Lessons not only teaches literacy, "it also initiates the child [reader] into the elements of society's symbol-systems and conceptual structures, inculcates an ethics, and encourages him to develop a certain kind of sensibility". One of the series' overall aims is to demonstrate that Charles is superior to the animals he encounters; because he can speak and reason, he is better than they are. Lessons for Children, of Three Years Old, part 2 begins:

Do you know why you are better than Puss? Puss can play as well as you; and Puss can drink milk, and lie upon the carpet; and she can run as fast as you, and faster too, a great deal; and she can climb trees better; and she can catch mice, which you cannot do. But can Puss talk? No. Can Puss read? No. Then that is the reason why you are better than Puss—because you can talk and read.

Andrew O'Malley writes in his survey of 18th-century children's literature, "from helping poor animals [Charles] eventually makes a seamless transition to performing small acts of charity for the poor children he encounters". (Note: See also Richardson (1994), p. 133.) Unlike Romanticism, Barbauld valued social responsibility and interdependence. As McCarthy puts it, "every human being needs other human beings in order to live. Humans are communal entities".

Lessons was probably meant to be paired with Barbauld's Hymns in Prose for Children (1781), which were both written for Charles. As F. J. Harvey Darton, an early scholar of children's literature, explains, they "have the same ideal, in one aspect held by Rousseau, in another wholly rejected by him: the belief that a child should steadily contemplate Nature, and the conviction that by so doing he will be led to contemplate the traditional God". However, some modern scholars have pointed to the lack of overt religious references in Lessons, particularly in contrast to Hymns, to make the claim that it is secular.

In what Mary Jackson has called the "new child" of the 18th century, she describes "a fondly sentimentalized state of childishness rooted in material and emotional dependency on adults" and she argues that the "new good child seldom made important, real decisions without parental approval ... In short, the new good child was a paragon of dutiful submissiveness, refined virtue, and appropriate sensibility". Other scholars, such as Sarah Robbins, have maintained that Barbauld presents images of constraint only to offer images of liberation later in the series: education for Barbauld. In this interpretation, is a progression from restraint to liberation, physically represented by Charles' slow movement from his mother's lap in the opening scene of first book, to a stool next to her in the opening of the subsequent volume, to his detachment from her side in the final book.

== Reception and legacy ==
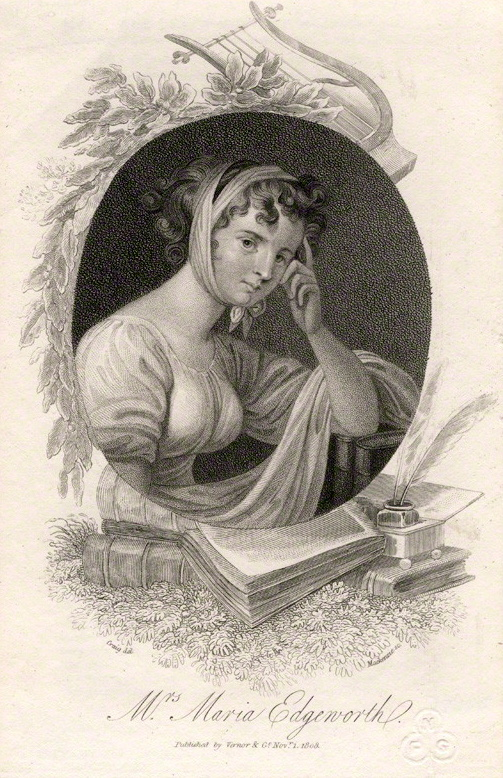
Maria Edgeworth, one of the most important children's writers to benefit from Barbauld's innovations

As McCarthy states, Lessons for Children and Barbauld's other popular children's book, Hymns in Prose for Children "were immensely influential in their time". Barbauld's contemporary William Blake was influenced by Hymns and poet Elizabeth Barrett Browning could still recite the beginning of Lessons at the age of 39. Both books were reprinted throughout the 19th century in England and the United States; as McCarthy also states, "their effect on nineteenth- and early twentieth-century middle-class people, who learned to read from them, is incalculable". They were also used to teach several generations of schoolchildren both in Britain and the United States. Barbauld's texts were used to perpetuate the ideal of Republican motherhood in 19th-century America, particularly the notion of the mother as the educator of the nation. British children's author and critic Charlotte Mary Yonge wrote in 1869 that the books had taught "three-quarters of the gentry of the last three generations" to read.

According to Myers, Barbauld's work inspired other educational ventures of the time, including the reforms of John Dewey, Friedrich Fröbel, and Johann Pestalozzi. After meeting Barbauld, the famous 18th-century novelist Frances Burney called Barbauld "the authoress of the most useful books"; Burney stated that Barbauld's "pretty poems, and particularly songs" were "generally esteemed".

Barbauld's biographer Betsy Rodgers states, regarding Barbauld's influence on others who wrote for and educated children: "[S]he gave prestige to the writing of juvenile literature, and by not lowering her standard of writing for children, she inspired others to write on a similar high standard". For example, Lessons had a "catalytic effect" on Sarah Trimmer; as Samuel F. Pickering Jr. states, "[A]fter reading them, she wrote her An Easy Introduction to the Knowledge of Nature and Reading the Holy Scriptures (1780), as in part a continuation of the Lessons for older children and thus began her distinguished career as a practical educator and writer of books for children". Lessons also influenced Trimmer and Hannah Moore's work with the charity and Sunday schools that taught working-class children how to read during much of the 18th century. Ann and Jane Taylor began writing children's poetry, the most famous of which is "Twinkle, Twinkle, Little Star". Ellenor Fenn wrote and designed a series of readers and games for middle-class children, including the best-selling Cobwebs to Catch Flies (1784). Richard Lovell Edgeworth began one of the first systematic studies of childhood development which would culminate not only in an educational treatise co-authored with Maria Edgeworth entitled Practical Education (1798), but also in a large body of children's stories by Maria, beginning with The Parent's Assistant (1798). Thomas Day originally began his important The History of Sandford and Merton (1783–89) for Edgeworth's collection, but it grew too long and was published separately. (Note: See also Richardson (1994), pp. 129–130; Darton (1982), p. 164; Jackson (1989), pp. 134–136; O'Malley (2003), p. 57; Robbins (1993), p. 139.)

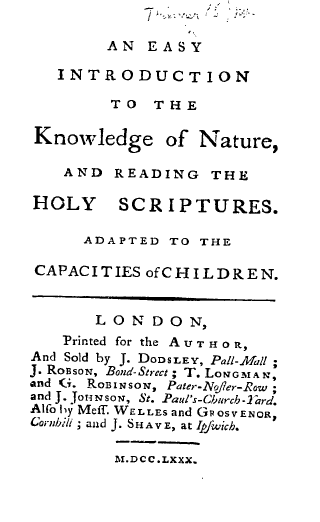
Title page from Sarah Trimmer's An Easy Introduction to the Knowledge of Nature (1780), which acknowledges Barbauld's influence in its preface

In the second half of the 1790s, Barbauld and her brother, the physician John Aikin, wrote a second series of books, Evenings at Home, aimed at more advanced readers, ages eight to twelve. While not as influential, they were also popular and remained in print for decades. Lessons was reprinted, translated, pirated, and imitated until the 20th century; according to Myers, it helped found a female tradition of educational writing.

While Day, for example, has been hailed as an educational innovator, Barbauld has most often been described through the unsympathetic words of her detractors. The politician Charles James Fox and the writer and critic Samuel Johnson ridiculed Barbauld's children's books and believed that she was wasting her poetic talents. In his Life of Johnson (1791), James Boswell recorded Johnson's thoughts:

Endeavouring to make children prematurely wise is useless labour ... Too much is expected from precocity, and too little performed. [Barbauld] was an instance of early cultivation, but in what did it terminate? In marrying a little Presbyterian parson, who keeps an infant boarding-school, so that all her employment now is, 'To suckle fools, and chronicle small beer.' She tells the children 'This is a cat, and that is a dog, with four legs and a tail; see there! you are much better than a cat or a dog, for you can speak.'

Romantic essayist Charles Lamb, in a letter to the poet Samuel Taylor Coleridge criticised Barbauld in this way, which Myers calls "a quotable but very dubious assessment":

Mrs. Barbauld['s] stuff has banished all the old classics of the nursery ... Mrs. B's and Mrs. Trimmer's nonsense lay in piles about. Knowledge insignificant & vapid as Mrs. B's books convey, it seems, must come to a child in the shape of knowledge, & his empty noddle must be turned with conceit of his own powers, when he has learnt, that a Horse is an animal, & billy is better than a Horse, & such like: instead of that beautiful Interest which made the child a man, while all the time he suspected himself to be no bigger than a child. Science has succeeded to Poetry no less in the little walks of Children than with Men.―: Is there no possibility of averting this sore evil? Think what you would have been now, if instead of being fed with Tales and old wives fables in childhood, you had been crammed with Geography & Natural History? Damn them. I mean the cursed Barbauld Crew, those Blights & Blasts of all that is Human in man & child [emphasis Lamb's].

This quote was used by writers and scholars to condemn Barbauld and other educational writers for a century. Myers, however, calls Lamb's ways of thinking about children were "embryonic" and mired in the long-standing and long-institutionalized "privileging of an imaginative canon and its separation from all the cultural knowledge that had previously been thought of as literature". Myers goes on to state that Lamb's criticism of Barbauld was also mired in the following; "the binary opposition of scientific, empiricist ways of knowing and intuitive, imaginative insights; even the two-tiered structure of most modern English departments, with male-dominated imaginative literature on the upper-deck and practical reading and writing instruction, taught most often by women and the untenured, relegated to the lower levels".

It was only in the 1990s and 2000s that Barbauld and other female educational writers began to be acknowledged in the history of children's literature and, indeed, in the history of literature itself. As Myers points out, "the writing woman as teacher has not captured the imagination of feminist scholars", and Barbauld's children's works are usually consigned to "the backwaters of children's literature surveys, usually deplored for their pernicious effect on the emergent cultural construction of Romantic childhood, or in the margins of commentary on male high Romanticism, a minor inspiration for Blake or Wordsworth perhaps". The male Romantics did not explore didactic genres that illustrated educational progress; rather, as Myers explains, their works embodied a "nostalgia for lost youth and [a] pervasive valorization of instinctive juvenile wisdom" not shared by many female writers at this time.

== Bibliography ==
=== Primary sources ===
- Barbauld, Anna Laetitia. Lessons for Children, from Two to Three Years Old. London: Printed for J. Johnson, 1787. Eighteenth Century Collections Online.
- Barbauld, Anna Laetitia. Lessons for Children, of Three Years Old. Part I. Dublin: Printed and sold by R. Jackson, 1779. Eighteenth Century Collections Online.
- Barbauld, Anna Laetitia. Second Part of Lessons for Children of Three Years Old. Dublin: Printed and sold by R. Jackson, 1779. Eighteenth Century Collections Online.
- Barbauld, Anna Laetitia. Lessons for Children from Three to Four Years Old. London: Printed for J. Johnson, 1788. Eighteenth Century Collections Online.

=== Secondary sources ===
- Darton, F. J. Harvey (1982). Children's Books in England: Five Centuries of Social Life (3rd ed.). Cambridge, England: Cambridge University Press. ISBN 0-521-24020-4.
- Jackson, Mary V. (1989). Engines of Instruction, Mischief, and Magic: Children's Literature in England from Its Beginnings to 1839. Lincoln, Nebraska: University of Nebraska Press. ISBN 0-8032-7570-6.
- McCarthy, William (Winter 1999). "Mother of All Discourses: Anna Barbauld's Lessons for Children" (PDF). Princeton University Library Chronicle. 60 (2). Princeton University: 196–219. doi:10.25290/prinunivlibrchro.60.2.0196. Archived from the original (PDF) on 18 November 2018.
- Myers, Mitzi (1995). "Of Mice and Mothers: Mrs. Barbauld's 'New Walk' and Gendered Codes in Children's Literature". In Wetherbee Phelps, Louise; Emig, Janet (eds.). Feminine Principles and Women's Experience in American Composition and Rhetoric. Pittsburgh, Pennsylvania: University of Pittsburgh Press. pp. 255–288. ISBN 978-0-8229-5544-3.
- O'Malley, Andrew (2003). The Making of the Modern Child: Children's Literature and Childhood in the Late Eighteenth Century. New York: Routledge. ISBN 0-415-94299-3.
- Pickering, Samuel F. Jr. (1981). John Locke and Children's Books in Eighteenth-Century England. Knoxville: University of Tennessee Press. ISBN 0-87049-290-X.
- Richardson, Alan (1994). Literature, Education, and Romanticism: Reading as Social Practice, 1780–1832. Cambridge University Press. pp. Cambridge, England. ISBN 0-521-60709-4.
- Robbins, Sarah (December 1993). "Lessons for Children and Teaching Mothers: Mrs. Barbauld's Primer for the Textual Construction of Middle-Class Domestic Pedagogy". The Lion and the Unicorn. 17 (2). Johns Hopkins University Press: 135–151. doi:10.1353/uni.0.0058. S2CID 143092185.
- Rodgers, Betsy (1958). Georgian Chronicle: Mrs. Barbauld and Her Family. London, England: Methuen.
