= Edmund Aikin =

English architect and writer

Edmund Aikin (2 October 1780 – 11 March 1820) was an English architect and writer on architecture. He spent the last years of his life in Liverpool, where he designed the Wellington Rooms.

== Life ==
Aikin came from a Unitarian background. He was the youngest son of Dr. John Aikin, M.D., and was born on 2 October 1780 at Warrington. Arthur Aikin and Charles Rochemont Aikin were his brothers, the writer Lucy Aikin was his sister, and Anna Barbauld was his aunt. In 1784 the family moved to Great Yarmouth, where his father practised as a doctor, and then, in 1792, to Broad Street Buildings in London. Aikin suffered from a speech impediment and was educated almost entirely at home by his parents.

He was articled to a builder and surveyor, and following his apprenticeship, set up in business as an architect and surveyor on his own account. In 1806 he became a founder-member of the London Architectural Society. Two early designs were for nonconformist chapels in London. In 1808, he designed one in Jewin Street, off Aldersgate Street in the City of London, where Abraham Rees was minister for many years. The next year he designed the New Gravel Pit Chapel in Hackney, for the Rev. Robert Aspland, producing plans for a rectangular building with an octagonal roof and seating plan. The foundation stone was laid on 16 October 1809, and it opened on 4 November 1810. Aikin took no fee for the work.

In 1810 he published a set of designs for villas, preceded by a long introduction in which he criticised the use of the Gothic style in domestic architecture, proposing instead the use of a kind of eastern, or Islamic style, inspired by the buildings shown in Thomas Daniell's Views in India. In 1812 he presented his Essay on the Doric Order to the London Architectural Society. He also wrote an account of St. Paul's Cathedral to accompany a set of drawings by James Elmes, articles about architecture for Abraham Rees Cyclopaedia, and a section on architecture for his sister Lucy's book about the reign of Elizabeth I. He exhibited designs at the Royal Academy between 1804 and 1814.

He worked as an assistant to Sir Samuel Bentham, the architect of the Millbank Penitentiary, who was then engaged on works in at the Royal Navy's dockyards at Sheerness and Portsmouth, and published designs, made in collaboration with Bentham, for a bridge over the River Swale. The Admiralty had refused funding for Aikin 's post. To Bentham's suggestion that "more attention should be paid than hitherto has been in regard to the works of my department, particularly those relative to the dockyards, to the giving them an appropriate beauty and grandeur of appearance", they had replied that they were "not aware of any buildings or works ordered to be taken in hand which require any particular beauty or grandeur of appearance, and therefore cannot comply with the request of the civil architect and engineer, who has already sufficient assistance to carry on the duties of his office." Consequently Bentham employed Aikin and a draughtsman directly for several months, at his own cost.

In around 1814, his Neoclassical designs for the Wellington Assembly Rooms in Liverpool having been accepted by the committee in charge of the project, he moved to the city to supervise their construction. He was based there for the rest of his life. He oversaw the adaptation of an existing mansion as premises for the Liverpool Royal Institution – his alterations including the addition of a stone portico – and built a number of villas in the area, some, against his natural inclinations, in the fashionable Gothic style.

Aikin died at his father's house at Stoke Newington on 11 March 1820.

== Publications ==
Aikin was the author of:

- Designs for villas and other rural buildings, Engraved on thirty-one plates, with plans and explanations; together with an introductory essay, containing remarks on the prevailing defects of modern architecture and on investigation of the style best adapted for the dwellings of the present times. (London, 1808)
- An essay on the Doric order of architecture : containing a historical view of its rise and progress among the ancients, with a critical investigation of its principles of composition and adaptation to modern use; illustrated by figures of the principal antique examples, drawn to one scale, from the best authorities (London, 1810)
- An essay towards a history and description of the cathedral church of St. Paul, London, with a concise account of the edifices which have previously occupied the same site (London, 1812). With illustrations by James Elmes.
