= Charles Rochemont Aikin =

English doctor and chemist

Charles Rochemont Aikin (1775–1847) was an English medical doctor and chemist.

== Biography ==
He was born at Warrington, Lancashire into a distinguished literary family of Unitarians. His father, John Aikin, was a medical doctor, historian, and author. His grandfather, also called John Aikin (1713–1780), was a Unitarian scholar and theological tutor, closely associated with Warrington Academy. His sister Lucy (1781–1864) was a historical writer; one brother Arthur (1773–1854) was a chemist, mineralogist, and scientific writer; another, Edmund, was an architect.

He was adopted as a child by his aunt, Anna Laetitia Barbauld, a poet, essayist, literary critic, editor, and children's author. She and her husband Rochemont ran a dissenting academy (a sort of boarding school for the sons of Dissenters) at Palgrave in Suffolk; Charles was educated at their Palgrave Academy. He is the "little Charles" of Mrs. Barbauld's Lessons for Children.

From an early age he devoted himself to science, and aided his eldest brother Arthur in his first published works and public lectures. Subsequently he applied himself to medicine, became a member of the Royal College of Surgeons, and was chosen secretary of the Medical and Chirurgical Society of London. He married Anne, daughter of the Rev. Gilbert Wakefield; one of their children was the writer and memoirist Anna Letitia Le Breton. Aikin died at his house in Bloomsbury Square, central London, on 20 March 1847.

== See also ==
- List of the founding medical men of the Royal Medical and Chirurgical Society of London

== Publications ==
- Concise View of all the most important Facts that have hitherto appeared respecting the Cow Pox, 1800.
- Dictionary of Chemistry and Mineralogy, 1807–1814, which he wrote in conjunction with his eldest brother.
- Rees's Cyclopædia, articles (topics unknown)
