= Elizabeth Benger =

English biographer, novelist and poet

Elizabeth Ogilvy Benger (baptised on 15 June 1775 at West Camel, Somerset, died on 9 January 1827 in London) was an English biographer, novelist and poet. Some of her poetry had a strong social message.

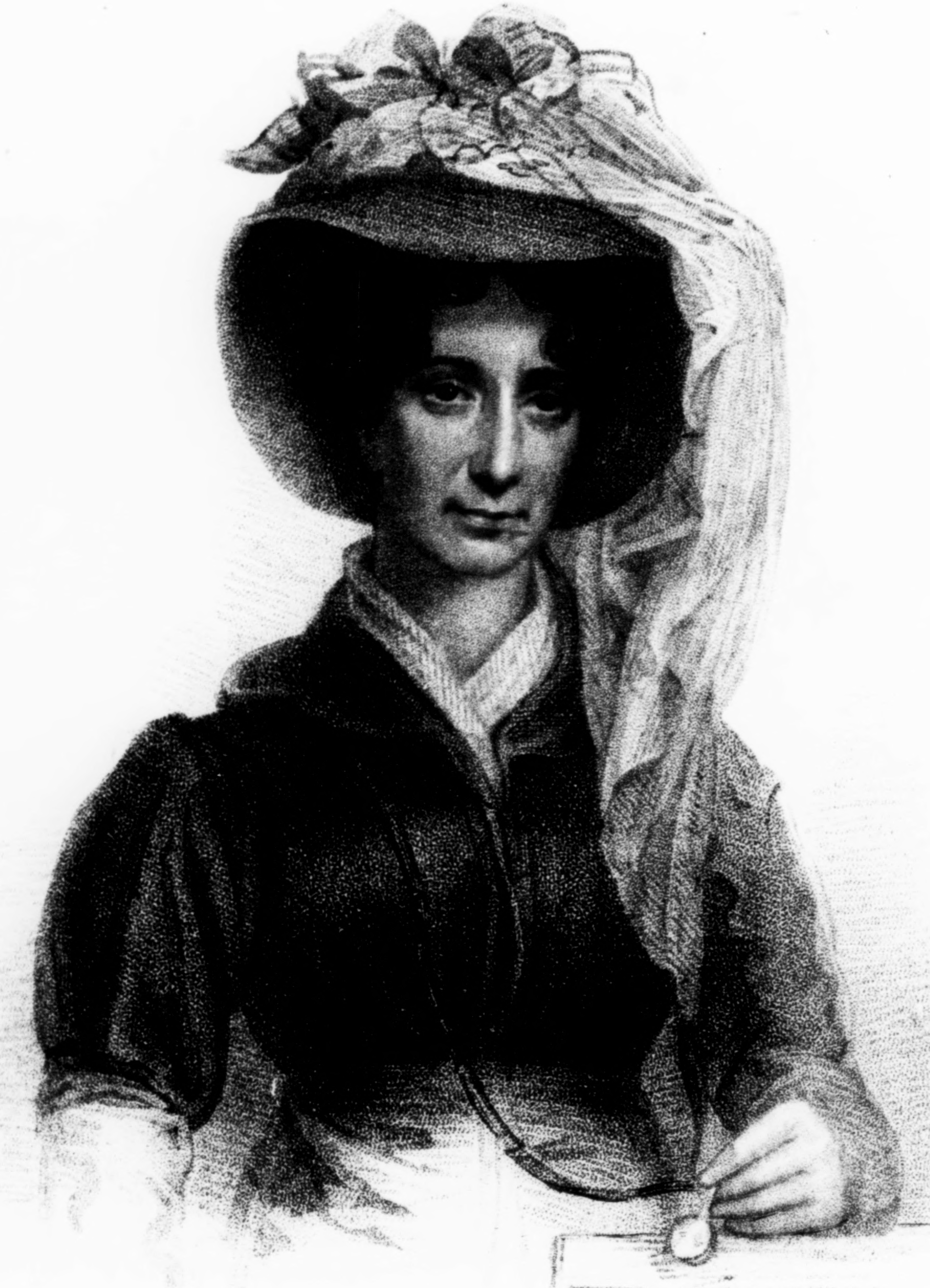
Stipple engraving of Elizabeth Benger

== Early life and education ==
Elizabeth was the daughter of John Benger or Benjey and his wife Elizabeth (Chambers) Benger. Her father was a tradesman in Wells. He became a Royal Navy purser in 1782 and the family lived mainly in Chatham, Kent until 1797. According to a fellow writer, Lucy Aikin, Elizabeth early showed "an ardour for knowledge, a passion for literature". She was allowed at the age of twelve to attend a local boys' school to learn Latin, and the next year had a poem published, The Female Geniad. This featured "female theologians, scholars, and preachers such as Cassandra del Fides, Isabella of Barcelona, and Issona of Verona, alongside Cornelia, as historic women to inspire 'the British fair' of her day." It was preceded by a customarily apologetic preface that "deploys innocence with great sophistication," as recent commentators put it. "The voice... is the voice of cultural authority."

== Career ==
Impoverished after the death of her father in 1796, the family moved to Devizes, Wiltshire, and then to London in 1802, where Benger made the acquaintance of several literary figures. These included the novelists Jane and Anna Maria Porter, and the poet Caroline Champion de Crespigny, a former mistress of Lord Byron. She later became known to John Aikin and his daughter Lucy, the poet and children's writer Anna Laetitia Barbauld, Sarah Wesley, the writer daughter of the prominent Methodist Charles Wesley, and the novelist and actress Elizabeth Inchbald. She made a poorer impression on Charles and Mary Lamb, and on the diarist Henry Crabb Robinson, who described her as "ludicrously fidgety" at a party where Wordsworth was present.

Elizabeth wanted to become a playwright, but she had no success and soon turned to poetry with a social message. "The Abolition of the Slave Trade" appeared in 1809, with verse by James Montgomery and James Grahame on the same subject. Then came two novels, the second of which was also translated into French.

She later turned to non-fiction, translating from German and introducing a volume of letters by Friedrich Gottlieb Klopstock, and to writing and compiling competent biographical materials on Elizabeth Hamilton, John Tobin, Elizabeth of Bohemia, Anne Boleyn and Mary, Queen of Scots between 1818 and 1825. After that, her health began to fail. She was collecting materials for a life of Henry IV of France when she died on 9 January 1827.

== Works ==
- The Female Geniad; a Poem. Inscribed to Mrs. Crespigny. By Elizabeth Ogilvy Benger, of Portsmouth; written at the age of thirteen. (1791)
- Poems on the Abolition of the Slave Trade; written by James Montgomery, James Grahame, and E. Benger. Embellished with engravings from pictures painted by R. Smirke, Esq. R.A. (1809)
- The West-Indies, by James Montgomery and other poems, on the abolition of the slave-trade, by James Grahame, and E. Benger. (1810)
- Marian. A Novel. In Three Volumes. (1812)
- The Heart and the Fancy; or, Valsinore. A Tale. By Miss Benger. In Two Volumes. (1813)
- Klopstock and His Friends: A Series of Familiar Letters, written between the years 1750 and 1803. Translated from the German, with a Biographical Introduction. bu Miss Benger. (1814)
- Memoirs of the late Mrs. Elizabeth Hamilton. With a selection from her correspondence, and other unpublished writings. (1818)
- Memoirs of Mr. John Tobin, Author of The Honey-Moon. With a Selection from his unpublished writings. By Miss Benger, Author of Memoirs of Mrs. Elizabeth Hamilton. (1820)
- Memoirs of the Life of Anne Boleyn, Queen of Henry VIII. By Miss Benger. Author of Memoirs of Mrs. Elizabeth Hamilton, John Tobin, &c. In Two Volumes. (1821)
- Memoirs of the Life of Mary Queen of Scots. By Miss Benger, Author of "Memoirs of Anne Boleyn," "Mrs. Hamilton," &c. &c. In Two Volumes. (1823)
- Memoirs of Elizabeth Stuart, Queen of Bohemia, Daughter of King James the First. Including Sketches of the state of Society in Holland and Germany, in the 17th century. By Miss Benger, Author of Memoirs of Anne Boleyn, Memoirs of Mary Queen of Scotts, &c. &c. In Two Volumes. (1825)
- The Laurel. Fugitive Poetry of the XIXth Century. (1830)
