= Eighteen Hundred and Eleven =

1812 poem by Anna Laetitia Barbauld

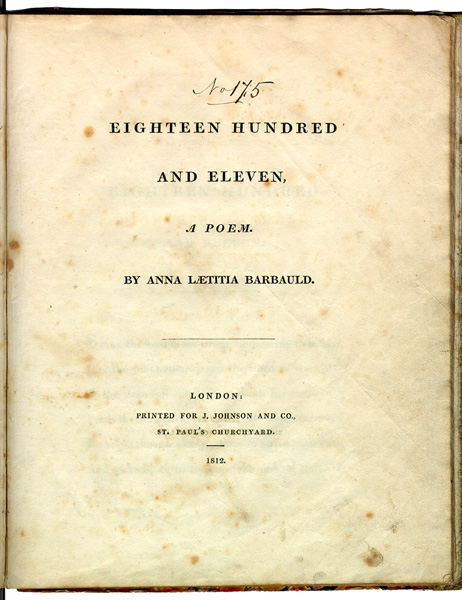
Original title page from Eighteen Hundred and Eleven

Eighteen Hundred and Eleven: A Poem (1812) is a poem by Anna Laetitia Barbauld criticising Britain's participation in the Napoleonic Wars.

== Analysis ==
Britain had been at war with France for a decade and was on the brink of losing, when Barbauld presented her readers with her shocking Juvenalian satire. She argued that the influence of Great Britain was waning and the influence of the United States was waxing. It was to the United States that Britain's wealth and fame will now go, she contended, and Britain will become nothing but an empty ruin. She tied this decline directly to Britain's participation in the Napoleonic Wars:

And think'st thou, Britain, still to sit at ease,
An island Queen amidst thy subject seas,
While the vext billows, in their distant roar,
But soothe thy slumbers, and but kiss thy shore?
To sport in wars, while danger keeps aloof,
Thy grassy turf unbruised by hostile hoof?
So sing thy flatterers; but, Britain, know,
Thou who hast shared the guilt must share the woe.
Nor distant is the hour; low murmurs spread,
And whispered fears, creating what they dread;
Ruin, as with an earthquake shock, is here (lines 39–49)

This pessimistic view of the future was, not surprisingly, poorly received; "reviews, whether in liberal or conservative magazines, ranged from cautious to patronizingly negative to outrageously abusive." Barbauld, stunned by the reaction, retreated from the public eye; in fact, she never published another work within her lifetime. Even when Britain was on the verge of winning the war, Barbauld could not be joyous. She wrote to a friend: "I do not know how to rejoice at this victory, splendid as it is, over Buonaparte [sic], when I consider the horrible waste of life, the mass of misery, which such gigantic combats must occasion."

Everard Green noted that "In her own time, the idea that the United States – then still mainly reckoned a minor and peripheral power – would one day eclipse the mighty British Empire was greeted with scorn. Indeed, at the time when the poem was written, Britain was yet to reach its zenith as a world power. Yet what Barbauld predicted did come to pass, though very much later – not due to the Napoleonic Wars, but due to the Second World War."

== See also ==
- Apocalyptic and post-apocalyptic fiction

== Bibliography ==
- Le Breton, Anna Letitia. Memoir of Mrs. Barbauld, including Letters and Notices of Her Family and Friends. By her Great Niece Anna Letitia Le Breton. London: George Bell and Sons, 1874.
- Barbauld, Anna Letitia. Anna Letitia Barbauld: Selected Poetry & Prose. Eds. William McCarthy and Elizabeth Kraft. Peterborough, Ontario: Broadview Press Ltd., 2002. ISBN 978-1-55111-241-1.
