= Wellington Rooms, Liverpool =

Historic building in Liverpool, England

Wellington Rooms
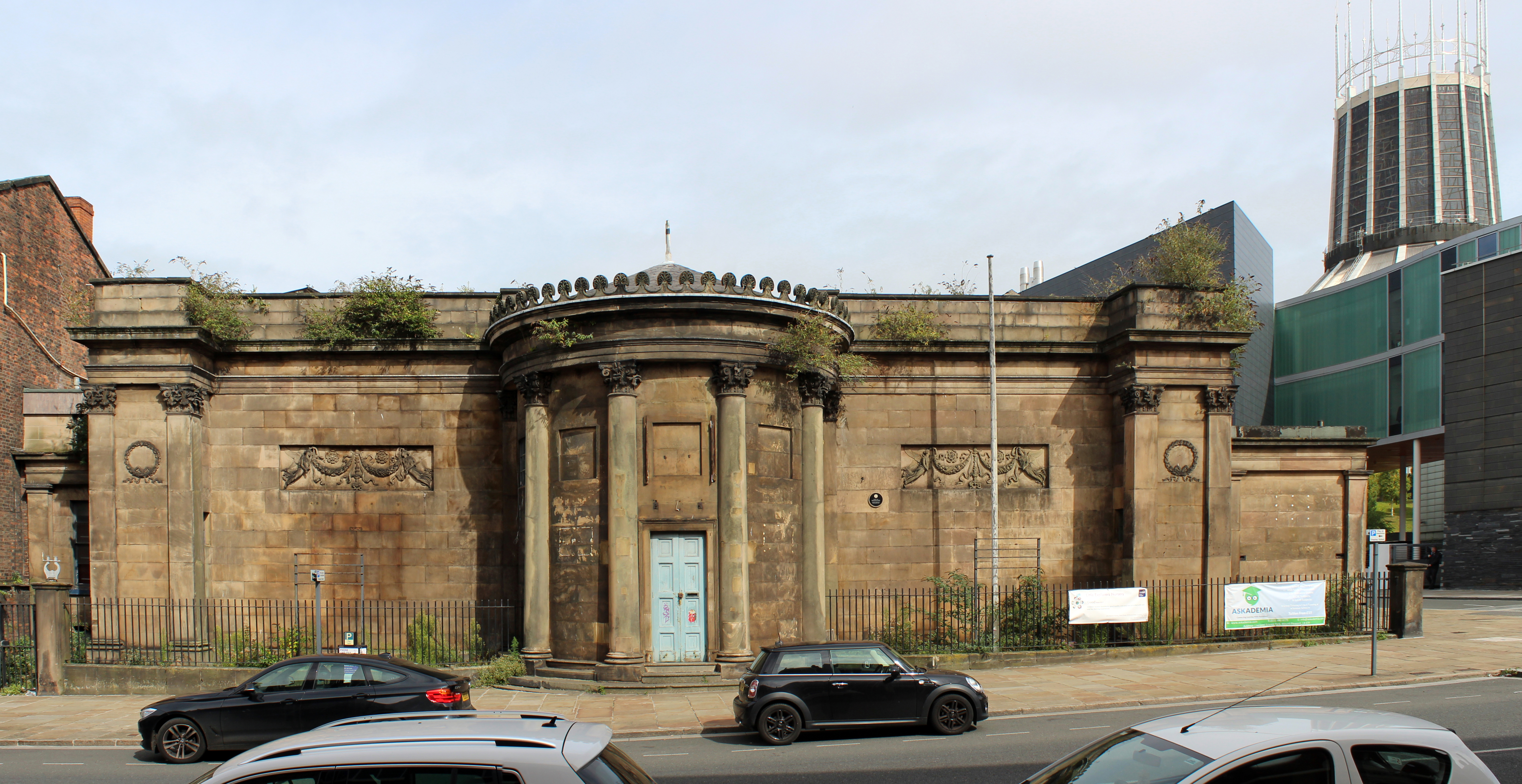
- The building in 2017
- Interactive map of the Wellington Rooms area

General information
- Architectural style: Neoclassical
- Location: Mount Pleasant, Liverpool, England
- Coordinates: 53.4038°N 2.9706°W
- Construction started: 1815
- Completed: 1816
- Client: Wellington Club

Design and construction
- Architect: Edmund Aikin
- Designations

Listed Building – Grade II*
- Official name: Wellington Rooms (now The Irish Centre)
- Designated: 28 June 1952
- Reference no.: 1208360

The Wellington Rooms, also known as the former Irish Centre, is a Regency building in Liverpool, England. Designed as assembly rooms, the building is situated on Mount Pleasant, close to Liverpool Metropolitan Cathedral.

The building has been closed since 1997, with emergency repair work taking place in 2018 to preserve it for future use.

== History ==
The Neoclassical building was designed by the architect Edmund Aikin and built between 1815–16 as a subscription assembly room for the Wellington Club. It was originally used by high society for assemblies, dance balls and parties. The Wellington Club was wound up in 1922.

Between 1923 and 1940 it was the Embassy Club and was used for tea dances, classes and weddings. During World War 2, the building became the first base for the Rodney Youth Centre, though bomb damage in 1941 affected all of the original ceilings with the exception of the ballroom.

The building officially opened as the Liverpool Irish Centre on 1 February 1965 hosting céilithe, music, drama performances as well as serving as a base for clubs and societies. The Irish Centre relocated in the 1990s, and the building became derelict.

== Architecture ==
The building was designed with a central entrance that leads into an octagonal room from which three further rooms can be accessed. These were originally used as a drawing room, refreshment room and ballroom. The building had three separate entrances which were intended for men, ladies and sedan-chairs & carriages.

The building is of red brick on a square corner plot, with a stone-faced frontage to Mount Pleasant, decorated with neo-classical motifs and a central bay entrance.

The Wellington Rooms were designated a listed building (Grade II*) in the 1950s, but this official protection did not prevent the property becoming derelict after the Irish Centre closed in 1997.

== Current status and proposed regeneration ==
The building was placed on the national Heritage at Risk Register in 1999, and has been one of the sites featured in the Liverpool Echo's Stop the Rot campaign. The building suffers from dry rot, dampness and loss of plaster from walls and ceiling which has been exacerbated by repeated lead theft from the roof.

Plans were announced in 2016 to turn the building into a Science and Technology Hub as part of the Knowledge Quarter plans.

Emergency repairs were approved in November 2016, with the work intended to be started in February 2017. £121,000 was to be spent repairing the roof and walls to prevent water getting into the building with half the money coming from Liverpool City Council and half from Historic England. In October 2017, the Liverpool Echo reported that the awarding of the tender for the restoration work had been delayed from February and was hoped to be awarded that month. £100,000 of emergency works began in February 2018. The works aim to survey the roof with a view to making the building watertight so that further restoration work can be carried out at a later date. A public consultation was launched in March 2018 to hear suggestions from local people for future uses for the building.

As of May 2024, there are no plans in place for the building, other than a survey of its current state.

== See also ==
- Architecture of Liverpool
- Grade II* listed buildings in Liverpool – City Centre
