= List of the founding medical men of the Royal Medical and Chirurgical Society of London =

This is a list of the medical men who founded the Royal Medical and Chirurgical Society in 1805, which later became the Royal Society of Medicine.

Founding medical men of the Royal Medical and Chirurgical Society of London
Name	Main place of work	Image
John Abernethy (1764 – 1831)		
John Addington		
C. R. Aikin		
William Babington	Guy's Hospital	
Matthew Baillie		
Thomas Bateman		
Gilbert Blane		
William Blizard	London Hospital	
John Clarke		
Astley Cooper	Guy's Hospital	
James Curry		
Dimsdale		
Sir Walter Farquhar		
Forster		
Algernon Frampton		
Garthshore		
John Heaviside		
Hunter		
Moore		
Myers		
John Pearson		
William Saunders		
Isaac Wilson		
Alexander Marcet	Guy's Hospital	
John Yelloly	London Hospital	
