= Ichharam Desai =

Ichharam Suryaram Desai
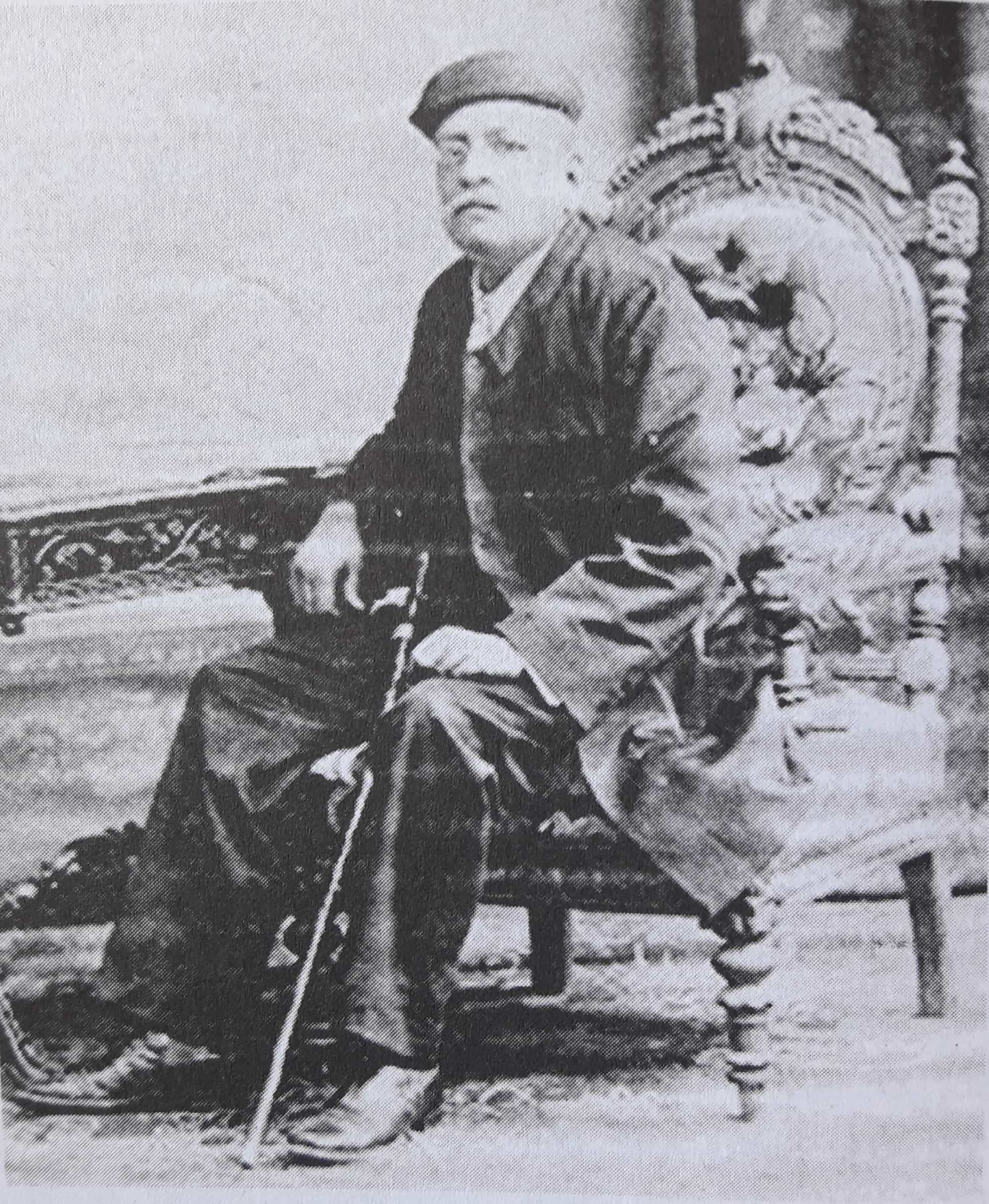
- Born: 10 August 1853; Surat, British India
- Died: 5 December 1912 (aged 59)
- Occupations: Author, anthologist and journalist
- Writing career
- Pen name: Shankar

Signature
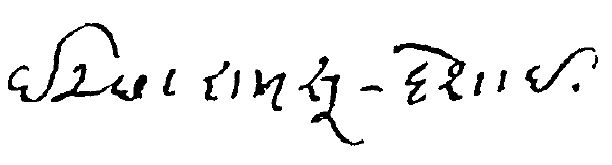

Ichharam Suryaram Desai (10 August 1853 – 5 December 1912), also known by his pen name, Shankar, was a Gujarati author, anthologist and journalist. Though he did not complete his primary education, he worked with several newspapers and magazines and also wrote several novels, edited anthologies and translated classics.

== Life ==
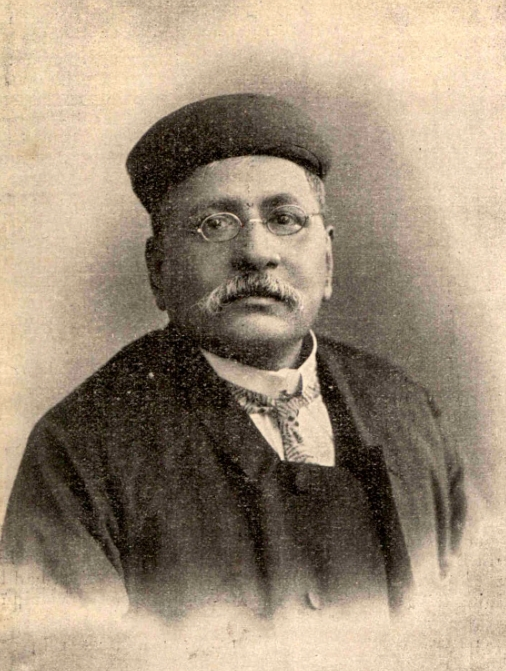

Ichharam was born on 10 August 1853 in Surat. He studied through sixth grade in English and during his youth developed an interest for manuscripts. He briefly worked for Deshimitra press as a typesetter. He moved to Bombay in 1876. He published Aryamitra weekly for four months before joining Bombay Samachar as a proofreader. In 1878, he moved back to Surat and started a monthly publication, Swatantrata, named by poet Narmad.

He was arrested for treason by British for his political writing but was freed later with the help of Pherozeshah Mehta. He again went to Bombay in 1880 and started publishing the Gujarati weekly which he ran until his death on 5 December 1912.

== Works ==
Hind ane Britannia (1886) is a political novel which discusses political conditions under British Raj in India of that time. His Shivajini Loot (1888) and Tipu Sultan (part 1, 1889, incomplete) are his historical novels. Ganga — Ek Gurjarvarta (1888) and Savitasundari (1890) are his social novels. Rajbhakti Vidamban (1889) and Bharatkhand na Rajyakarta are his other works.

Chandrakant (1889, 1901, 1907) is an incomplete series on Vedanta philosophy. He compiled the Brihat Kavyadohan, volume I—VIII (1886—1913), an anthology on medieval Gujarati poets and poetry. He edited several books including Purushottam Maas ni Katha (1872), Okhaharan (1885), Nalakhyan (1885), Padbandh Bhagwat (1889), Krishnacharitra (1895), Adi Bhaktakavi Narsinh Mehta Krit Kavya-sangraha (1913). He edited translation of Mahabharata in three volumes (1904, 1911, 1921) after being translated by others.

He translated several works into Gujarati including Raselas (1886), Yamasmriti (1887), Maharani Victoria nu Jivancharitra (1887), Charucharya athva Subhachar (1889), Arabian Nights volume 1–2 (1889), Kathasaritsagara volume 1–2 (1891), Kalavilas (1889), Vidurneeti (1890), Kamandkiya Neetisaar (1890), Saral Kadambari (1890), Shridhari Geeta (1890), Shukneeti (1893), Balako no Anand volume 1–2 (1895), Rajatarangini athva Kashmir no Itihaas volume 1 (1898), Aurangzeb (1898), Panchadasi (1900), Valmiki Ramayana (1919).
