= Evenings at Home =

Collection of volumes of stories by John Aikin and Anna Laetitia Barbauld

Evenings at Home or, The Juvenile Budget Opened
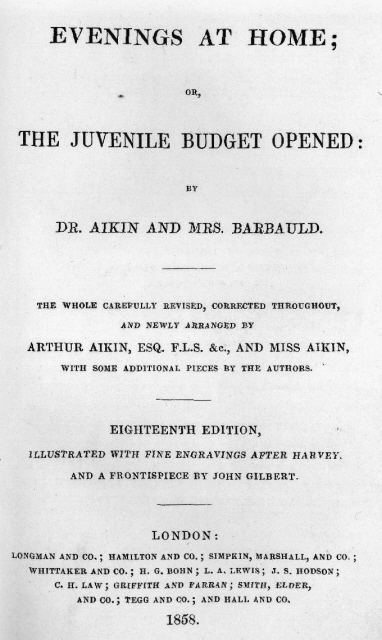
- Title page from a later (1858) edition.
- Author: John Aikin and Anna Letitia Barbauld
- Language: English
- Genre: Novel
- Publisher: Longman and Co. et al.
- Publication date: 1796
- Publication place: England
- Media type: Print (Hardback)

Evenings at Home, or The Juvenile Budget Opened (1792–1796) is a collection of six volumes of stories written by John Aikin and his sister Anna Laetitia Barbauld. It is an early example of children's literature. The late Victorian children's writer Mary Louisa Molesworth named it as one of the handful of books that was owned by every family in her childhood and read enthusiastically. In their introduction, the authors explain the title in these words:

Frontispiece to the 1858 Longman and Co. et al. edition.

...As some of them [the Fairborne family] were accustomed to writing, they would frequently produce a fable, a story, a dialogue, adapted to the age and understanding of young people. It was always considered as a high favour when they would so employ themselves; and when the pieces were once read over, they were carefully deposited by Mrs. Fairborne in a box, of which she kept the key. None of these were allowed to be taken out again till all the children were assembled in the holydays. It was then made one of the evening amusements of the family to rummage the budget, as their phrase was. One of the least children was sent to the box, who, putting in its little hand, drew out the paper that came next, and brought it into the parlour. This was then read distinctly by one of the elder ones; and after it had undergone sufficient consideration, another little messenger was dispatched for a fresh supply; and so on, till as much time had been spent in this manner as the parents thought proper. Other children were admitted to these readings; and as the Budget of Beechgrove Hall became somewhat celebrated in the neighbourhood, its proprietors were at length urged to lay it open to the public...

The book was translated into French. W. S. Gilbert took the title for one of his plays, Eyes and No Eyes (1875), from one of the stories in the collection. Ichchharam Desai translated these stories in Gujarati as Balkono Anand (1895).
