= Lucy Aikin =

English writer and biographer (1781–1864)

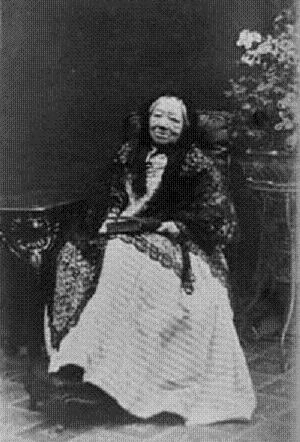
- Portrait of Lucy Aikin, c. 1860
- Born: 6 November 1781; Warrington, England
- Died: 29 January 1864 (aged 82); Hampstead, England
- Resting place: St John-at-Hampstead
- Occupation: Author
- Relatives: Anna Laetitia Barbauld (aunt); Anna Letitia Le Breton (niece)

Lucy Aikin (6 November 1781 – 29 January 1864) was an English writer and biographer. She is best known for her historical works Memoirs of the Court of Queen Elizabeth (1818) and Memoirs of the Court of James I (1822), which have been reprinted and translated into French and German throughout the 19th century. She also published under pseudonyms such as Mary Godolphin. Her literary-minded family included her aunt Anna Laetitia Barbauld, a writer of poetry, essays and children's books as well as Anna Letitia Le Breton, a writer who wrote memoirs of the Aikin literary family.

== Early life and education ==
Aikin was born at Warrington, then Lancashire, in 1781. She was the fourth child of a physician, John Aikin (1747–1822), and his wife, Martha Jennings (died 1830). Theirs was a literary family of prominent Unitarians. Lucy's father was also a historian, and her grandfather, likewise called John Aikin (1713–1780), was a Unitarian scholar and theological tutor, closely associated with Warrington Academy. Lucy's aunt was Anna Laetitia Barbauld, a prominent children's writer, while her brother Arthur Aikin (1773–1854) was a chemist, mineralogist and scientific writer, and their brother Charles Rochemont (1775–1847) was adopted by Barbauld and became a doctor and chemist. Another brother, the architect Edmund Aikin (1780–1820), wrote influential works about architecture.

Lucy Aikin lived with her parents in Great Yarmouth and Stoke Newington until the death of her father in 1822, when she moved to Hampstead. There, apart from a short interval in Wimbledon, she spent the remainder of her life.

She briefly attended a day school in Yarmouth, but was largely educated privately by her father and her aunt, an early critic of the education system. She "read widely in English, French, Italian, and Latin literature and history," began publishing for magazines at the age of 17, and was soon assisting her father as an editor of his writings.

== Works ==
Aikin's works delve into the artistic, social, and literary sides of her period, rather than its religious, military or parliamentary history.

In 1810 appeared her first considerable work, Epistles on Women, Exemplifying their Character and Condition in Various Ages and Nations, with Miscellaneous Poems, and in 1814 her only work of fiction, entitled Lorimer, a Tale. Those were just early efforts, but her reputation was gained wholly by historical works published between 1818 and 1843: Memoirs of the Court of Queen Elizabeth (1818); Memoirs of the Court of James I. (1822); Memoirs of the Court of Charles I. (1833); and the Life of Addison (1843). The last of these, containing many letters of Addison never before published, was the subject of an essay by Macaulay, who while praising Aikin's other works, and especially her Memoirs of the Court of James I, observed that she was "far more at home among the ruffs and peaked beards of Theobalds than among the steenkirks and flowing periwigs which surrounded Queen Anne's tea table at Hampton."

Of her other memoirs, she herself wrote on completing her Charles I, "I am resolved against proceeding farther with English sovereigns. Charles II is no theme for me: it would make me condemn my species." Aikin also wrote a life of her father, and of her aunt, Mrs Barbauld, and many minor pieces.

Like Barbauld, Aikin was interested in early education, and as such published several works to assist young readers: Poetry for Children: Consisting of Short Pieces to be Committed to Memory (1801), Juvenile Correspondence or Letters, Designed as Examples of the Epistolary Style, for Children of Both Sexes (1811), An English Lesson Book, for the Junior Classes (1828), and The Acts of Life: of Providing Food, of Providing Clothing, of Providing Shelter (1858). Under the pseudonym Mary Godolphin, Aikin also contributed as an editor to versions of Pilgrim's Progress, Robinson Crusoe, Swiss Family Robinson, Aesop's Fables, Evenings at Home (by her father and aunt), and Sandford and Merton written "in Words of One Syllable".

== Letters and translations ==
Aikin's conversational powers were remarkable, and she was a graceful and graphic letter writer. Her letters to her relatives and intimate friends showed her relish for society, and were full of wit and lively anecdotes of distinguished literary persons. She maintained for almost 16 years (1826–1842) a graver correspondence with the Rev. Dr William Ellery Channing, an American Unitarian theologian in Boston, on religion, philosophy, politics, and literature.

Aikin's letters were known for criticizing leaders on both sides of the Atlantic, and for criticisms of various authors, male and female. Her letters also showed an appreciation for classic and contemporary literature.

Aikin also translated French texts: Louis Francois Jauffret's The Travels of Rolando (publication around 1804), and Jean Gaspard Hess's The Life of Ulrich Zwingli (1812), on a leader of the Reformation in Switzerland.

== Personal life ==
Aikin never married or had children. She lived her whole life with family, notably her parents and her niece, although she did briefly live with her nephew in London.

Politically Aikin was a staunch feminist, and religiously she was a Unitarian.

== Death and legacy ==
Lucy Aikin died of influenza in 1864 in Hampstead, then just north of London, where she had lived for 40 years. At the time of her death, Aikin had less than £9,000. Her niece Anna Letitia Le Breton took over her literary legacy. Aikin's Memoirs, Miscellanies, and Letters were published in 1864, as was an edited version of her correspondence with Channing ten years later, in 1874 (London and Edinburgh: Williams and Norgate).

== Selected works ==
- 1801: Poetry for Children: Consisting of Short Pieces to be Committed to Memory
- 1804: Louis Francois Jauffret’s The Travels of Rolando (translation from French)
- 1810: Epistles on Women, Exemplifying their Character and Condition in Various Ages and Nations, with Miscellaneous Poems
- 1811: Juvenile Correspondence or Letters, Designed as Examples of the Epistolary Style, for Children of Both Sexes
- 1812: Jean Gaspard Hess’s The Life of Ulrich Zwingli (translation from French)
- 1814: Lorimer, a Tale
- 1818: Memoirs of the Court of Queen Elizabeth, published in several later editions
- 1822: Memoirs of the Court of James I. Vol. I; Vol. II
- 1823: Memoir of John Aikin, MD
- 1825: The Works of Anna Laetita Barbauld. With a memoir. Vol. I; Vol. II
- 1827: The Life of Anne Boleyn
- 1828: An English Lesson Book, for the Junior Classes
- 1833: Memoirs of the Court of Charles I. Vol. I; Vol. II
- 1843: The Life of Joseph Addison
- 1858: The Acts of Life: of Providing Food, of Providing Clothing, of Providing Shelter
- 1858: Holiday Stories for Young Readers
- 1864: Memoirs, Miscellanies and Letters of the Late Lucy Aikin
- 1874: Correspondence of William Ellery Channing and Lucy Aikin, from 1826-1842

=== Works attributed to her as Mary Godolphin ===
- 1867: Robinson Crusoe: In Words of One Syllable
- 1868: Sandford and Merton: In Words of One Syllable
- 1868: An Evening at Home: In Words of One Syllable
- 1869: Aesop's Fables: In Words of One Syllable
- 1869: The Pilgrim's Progress: In Words of One Syllable
- 1869: The Swiss Family Robinson: In Words of One Syllable
- 1870: The One Syllable Sunday Book
