= The History of Sandford and Merton =

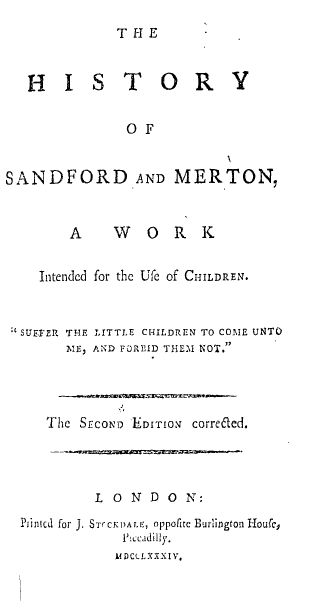
Title page from the second edition of Sandford and Merton

The History of Sandford and Merton (1783–89) was a best-selling children's book written by Thomas Day. He began it as a contribution to Richard Lovell and Honora Sneyd Edgeworth's Harry and Lucy, a collection of short stories for children that Maria Edgeworth continued some years after her stepmother died. He eventually expanded his original short story into the first volume of The History of Sandford and Merton, which was published anonymously in 1783; two further volumes subsequently followed in 1786 and 1789. The book was wildly successful and was reprinted until the end of the nineteenth century. It retained enough popularity or invoked enough nostalgia at the end of the nineteenth century to inspire a satire, The New History of Sandford and Merton, whose preface proudly announces that it will "teach you what to don't".

== Overview ==
Despite its title, The History of Sandford and Merton is not a "history" in the modern sense but rather an assemblage of stories Day both wrote himself and extracted from a multitude of sources that is only nominally held together by a thread narrative. The "history of Sandford and Merton" follows the reformation of Tommy Merton who is transformed from a spoiled six-year-old boy into a virtuous gentleman (Day defines virtue as the appreciation of the value of labour). Tommy, having been pampered and indulged by his mother and their slaves in the West Indies, is a proud and ignorant aristocrat; he lacks the sterling qualities of "plain, honest" Henry (Harry) Sandford, the yeoman farmer's son, who becomes his model and mentor in the book. Both are guided by a mentor, Mr. Barlow. Day wanted to emphasize the series of stories he had collected, which ranged from moral tales to scientific lessons to fables, but the book became famous for the story of Tommy and Harry. Many abridgements which appeared after Day's death reflect this interest; they condense the book, remove sections on educational philosophy and highlight the relationship between the two boys. One, for example, was by Lucy Aikin in 1868 as Sandford and Merton: In Words of One Syllable.

The text embodies many of the educational and philosophical tenets espoused by Jean-Jacques Rousseau, whom Day admired greatly. Sandford and Merton was his way of presenting Rousseau's philosophy to British children in the form of fiction. Harry, the farmer's son, "is the personification of Rousseau's ideas... He abjures the decadence of modern life... To the surprise of Tommy Merton and his parents, Harry is unimpressed, and even critical, of their luxuries, their fine food, their many possessions, preferring his own uncomplicated life of hard work, active virtue and simple pleasures." Over the course of the narrative, Tommy comes to appreciate and adopt these values as well.

== Legacy ==
In Charles Dickens' famous novel David Copperfield, the book is referred to as the "crocodile book". Pegotty, maidservant in Copperfield house, reads crocodile episodes to child David from the book. Dickens' eponymous hero fantasizes about the various incidents and adventures described in the book.

So prevalent was the ideal of the book portraying good morals for children, that Ethel Turner started her book Seven Little Australians with the warning "If you imagine you are going to read of model children, with perhaps; a naughtily inclined one to point a moral, you had better lay down the book immediately and betake yourself to 'Sandford and Merton'..."

It was referenced in "Three Men in a Boat" when the Narrator recalls a child at his school: "we used to call him Sandford and Merton...He was full of weird and unnatural notions about being a credit to his parents and an honour to the school; and he yearned to win prizes, and grow up and be a clever man, and had all those sorts of weak-minded ideas".

== Bibliography ==
- Chandler, Anne. "Defying 'Development': Thomas Day’s Queer Curriculum in Sandford and Merton." Novel Gazing: Queer Readings in Fiction. Ed. Eve Kosofsky Sedgwick. Durham: Duke University Press, 1997.
- Darton, F. J. Harvey. Children’s Books in England: Five Centuries of Social Life. 3rd ed. Revised by Brian Alderson. Cambridge: Cambridge University Press, 1982. ISBN 0-521-24020-4.
- Gignilliat Jr., George Warren. The Author of Sandford and Merton: A Life of Thomas Day, Esq. New York: Columbia University Press, 1932.
- Jackson, Mary V. Engines of Instruction, Mischief, and Magic: Children’s Literature in England from Its Beginnings to 1839. Lincoln: University of Nebraska Press, 1989. ISBN 0-8032-7570-6.
- O'Malley, Andrew. The Making of the Modern Child: Children's Literature and Childhood in the Late Eighteenth Century. New York: Routledge, 2003. ISBN 0-415-94299-3.
- Pickering, Samuel F., Jr. John Locke and Children’s Books in Eighteenth-Century England. Knoxville: The University of Tennessee Press, 1981. ISBN 0-87049-290-X.
- Richardson, Alan. Literature, Education, and Romanticism: Reading as Social Practice, 1780–1832. Cambridge: Cambridge University Press, 1994. ISBN 0-521-60709-4.
- Rowland, Peter. The Life and Times of Thomas Day, 1748–1789: English Philanthropist and Author, Virtue Almost Personified. Lewiston: E. Mellen Press, 1996. ISBN 0-7734-8844-8.
- Scott, S. H. The Exemplary Mr Day, 1748–1789, author of Sandford and Merton, A Philosopher in Search of the Life of Virtue and of a Paragon Among Women. London: Faber and Faber Ltd., [1935].
