= Arthur Aikin =

English chemist, mineralogist and scientific writer (1773–1854)

Arthur Aikin FLS, FGS
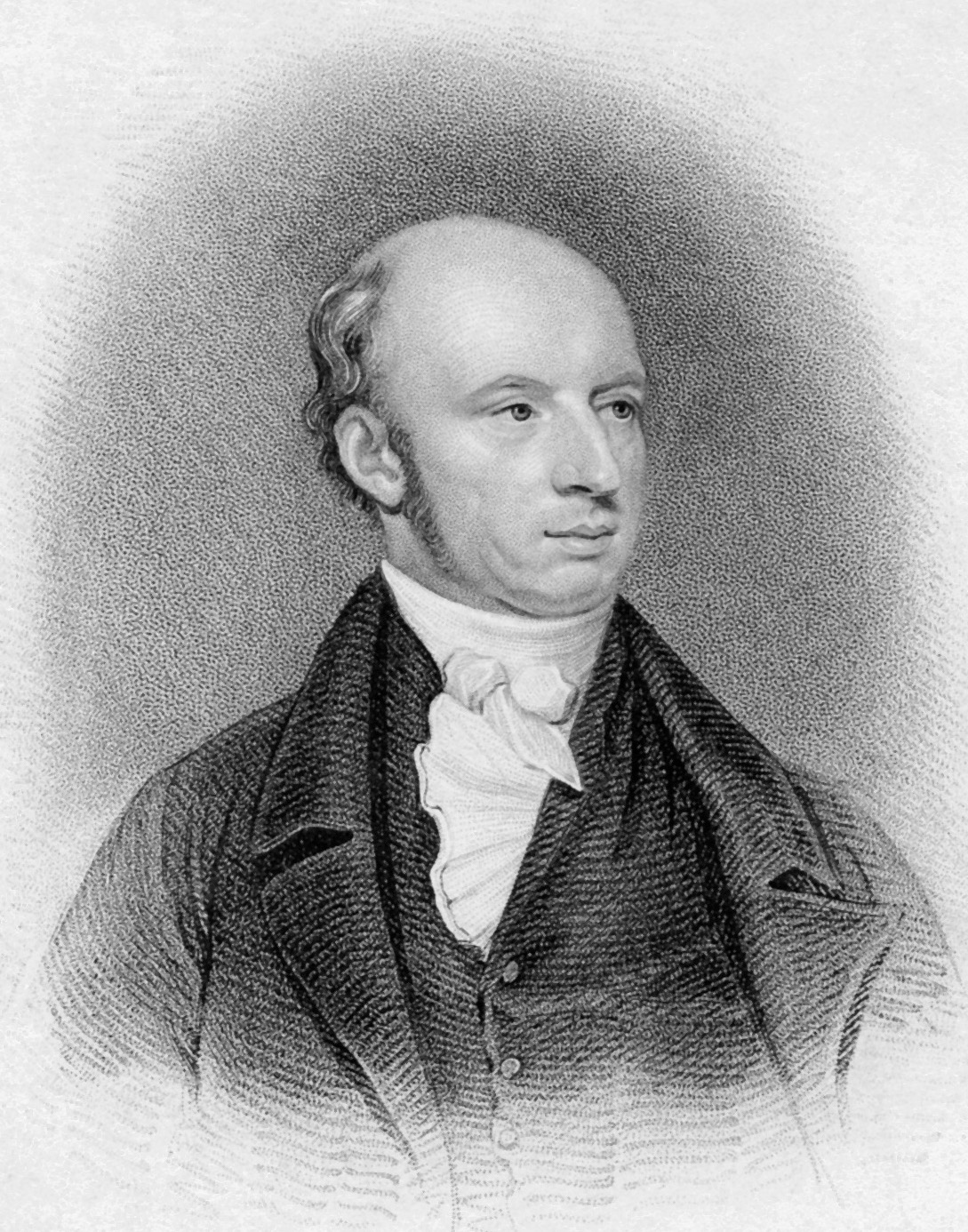
- Arthur Aikin (1773–1854)
- Born: 19 May 1773; Warrington, Lancashire, England
- Died: 15 April 1854 (aged 80); Hoxton, Middlesex, England
- Known for: Geological Society of London
- Scientific career
- Fields: Chemistry

Arthur Aikin (19 May 1773 – 15 April 1854) was an English chemist, mineralogist and scientific writer, and was a founding member of the Chemical Society (now the Royal Society of Chemistry). He first became its treasurer in 1841, and later became the society's second president.

== Life ==
He was born at Warrington, Lancashire into a distinguished literary family of prominent Unitarians. The best known of these was his paternal aunt, Anna Laetitia Barbauld, a woman of letters who wrote poetry and essays as well as early children's literature. His father, Dr John Aikin, was a medical doctor, historian, and author. His grandfather, also called John (1713–1780), was a Unitarian scholar and theological tutor, closely associated with Warrington Academy. His sister Lucy (1781–1864) was a historical writer. Their brother Charles Rochemont Aikin was adopted by their famous aunt and brought up as their cousin.

Arthur Aikin studied chemistry under Joseph Priestley in the New College at Hackney, and gave attention to the practical applications of the science. In early life, he was a Unitarian minister for a short time. Aikin lectured on chemistry at Guy's Hospital for thirty-two years. He became the President of the British Mineralogical Society in 1801 for five years up until 1806 when the Society merged with the Askesian Society. From 1803 to 1808 he was editor of the Annual Review. In 1805 Aiken also became a proprietor of the London Institution, which was officially founded in 1806. He was one of the founders of the Geological Society of London in 1807 and was its honorary secretary in 1812–1817. He also gave lectures in 1813 and 1814. He contributed papers on the Wrekin and the Shropshire coalfield, among others, to the transactions of that society. His Manual of Mineralogy was published in 1814. Later he became the paid secretary of the Society of Arts and later was elected as a fellow. He was founder of the Chemical Society of London in 1841, being its first treasurer and, between 1843 and 1845, second president.

In order to support himself, outside of his work with the British Mineralogical Society, the London Institution and the Geological Society, Aiken worked as a writer, translator and lecturer to the public and to medical students at Guy's Hospital. His writing and journalism were useful for publicising foreign scientific news to the wider British public. He was also a member of the Linnean Society and in 1820 joined the Institution of Civil Engineers.

He was highly esteemed as a man of sound judgement and wide knowledge. Aikin never married, and died at Hoxton in London in 1854.

== Publications ==
- The natural history of the year; being an enlargement of Dr. Aikin's Calendar of nature, 1798
- Journal of a Tour through North Wales and Part of Shropshire with Observations in Mineralogy and Other Branches of Natural History (London, 1797)
- Syllabus of a course of lectures on chemistry, by A. and C.R. Aikin, 1799
- The Annual review and history of literature; for 1807, 1808
- A Manual of Mineralogy (1814; ed. 2, 1815)
- dictionary of chemistry and mineralogy, with an account of the processes employed in many of the most important chemical manufactures. To which are added a description of chemical apparatus, and various useful tables of weights and measures, chemical instruments, &c. &c. Vol. I; Vol. II (with his brother C. R. Aikin), 2 vols. (London, 1807, 1814).
- An account of the most important recent discoveries and improvements in chemistry and mineralogy, to the present time : being an appendix to their Dictionary of chemistry and mineralogy, 1814

For Rees's Cyclopædia he wrote articles about chemistry, geology and mineralogy, but the topics are not known.
