= John Aikin =

English doctor and surgeon (1747–1822)

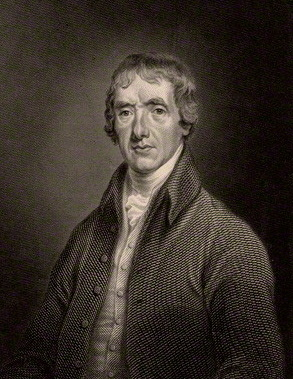
- John Aikin, published in 1823
- Born: 15 January 1747; Kibworth Harcourt, Leicestershire, England
- Died: 7 December 1822 (aged 75); Stoke Newington, Middlesex, England
- Occupations: Physician; writer
- Spouse: Martha Aikin (m. 1772)
- Children: Arthur Aikin; Charles Rochemont Aikin; Edmund Aikin; Lucy Aikin
- Father: John Aikin
- Relatives: Arthur Annesley, 1st Earl of Anglesey (great-grandfather); John Jennings (grandfather); Anna Laetitia Barbauld (sister); Anna Letitia Le Breton (biological granddaughter)

John Aikin (15 January 1747 – 7 December 1822) was an English medical doctor and surgeon. Later in life he devoted himself wholly to biography and writing in periodicals.

== Life ==
Aikin was born on 15 January 1747 in Kibworth Harcourt, Leicestershire to John Aikin, a theologian and classics tutor at Warrington Academy, and Jane "Jenny" Aikin (née Jennings; 1714–1785). Through his mother, Aikin was the grandson of the minister and tutor John Jennings and the great-grandson of the Anglo-Irish politician Arthur Annesley, 1st Earl of Anglesey. Aikin was the younger brother of the poet and essayist Anna Laetitia Barbauld.

Initially educated at home, Aikin enrolled at Warrington Academy in 1758. Apprenticed to a surgeon and pharmacist in Uppingham in 1761, Aikin entered the University of Edinburgh Medical School in 1764. Leaving Edinburgh without a degree, Aikin continued his studies in Manchester from 1766 to 1769, followed by a year in London under William Hunter. Establishing a surgical practice in Chester, Aikin later settled in Warrington where he founded a surgical practice in 1771. Finally, he went to Leiden in Holland, earned an M.D. in 1780, and in 1784 established himself as a doctor in Great Yarmouth.

In 1792, one of his pamphlets having given offence, he moved to London, where he practised as a consulting physician. He lived in Church Street, Stoke Newington. However, he concerned himself more with the advocacy of liberty of conscience than with his professional duties, and he began at an early period to devote himself to literary pursuits, to which his contributions were incessant. When Richard Phillips founded The Monthly Magazine in 1796, Aikin was its first editor. In conjunction with his sister, Anna Laetitia Barbauld, he published a popular series of volumes entitled Evenings at Home (6 vols, 1792–1795), for elementary family reading, which were translated into almost every European language.

== Works ==
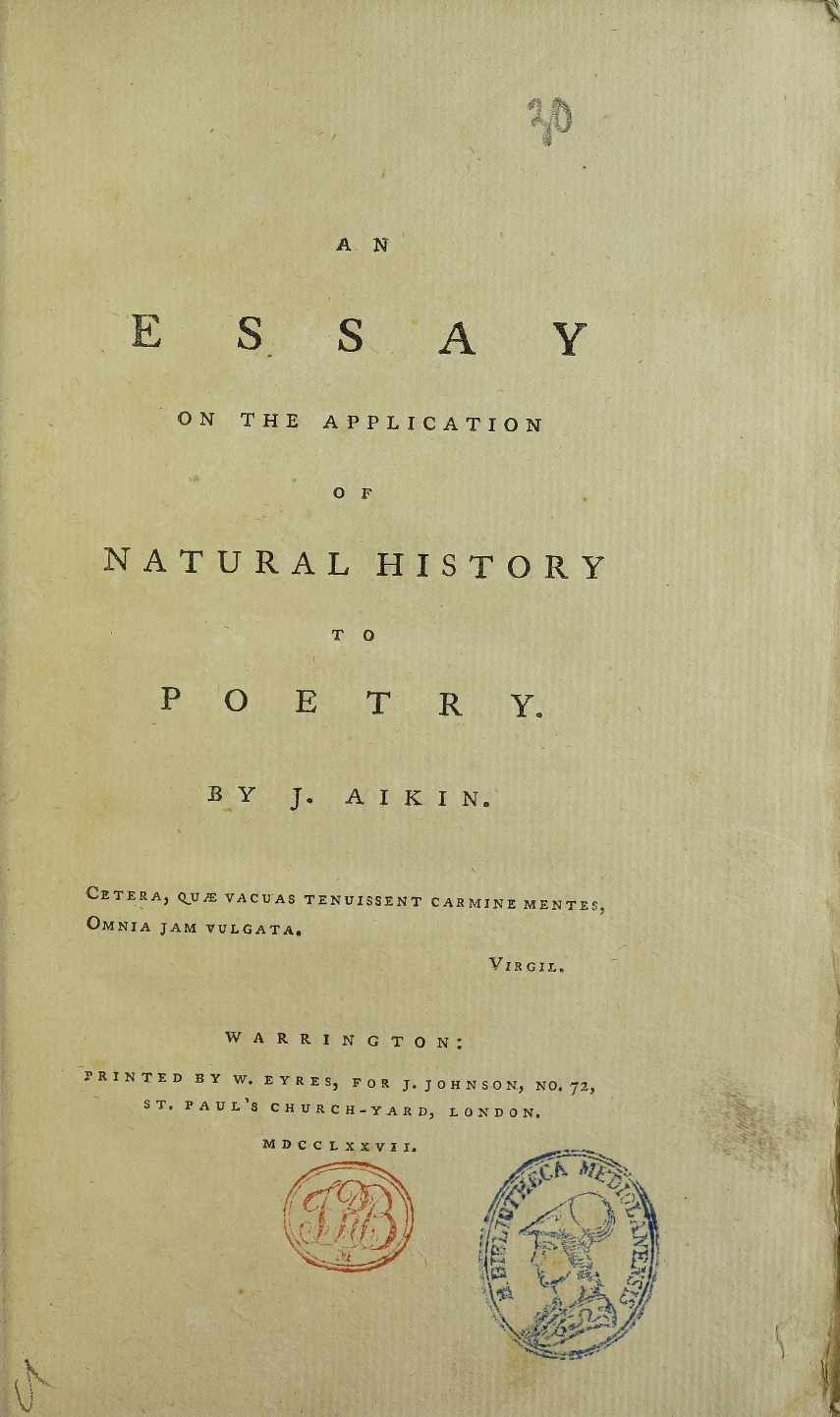
Essay on the application of natural history to poetry, 1777

In 1798 Aikin retired altogether from medicine and devoted himself to literary undertakings such as his General Biography (10 vols, 1799–1815). His other work included Biographical Memoirs of Medicine in Great Britain (1780), The Arts of Life... described in a series of letters. For the instruction of young persons (1802, reprinted 1807), and The Lives of John Selden, Esq., and Archbishop Usher (1812).

Apart from editing The Monthly Magazine (1796–1807) and Dodsley's Annual Register (1811–1815), Aikin produced a paper called The Athenaeum in 1807–1809, not to be confused with the well-known magazine The Athenaeum (1828–1921).

== Personal life ==
On 8 July 1772, Aikin married Martha Aikin (née Jennings; c. 1746–1830) with whom he had four biological children:

- Arthur Aikin (1773–1854), natural scientist and author
- Charles Rochemont Aikin (1775–1847), surgeon and father of Anna Letitia Le Breton
- Edmund Aikin (1780–1820), architect
- Lucy Aikin (1781–1864), historian

Charles was later adopted by Aikin's sister and brother-in-law, the Revd Rochemont Barbauld (1749–1808), at the age of 2. Aikin died on at his home in Stoke Newington on 7 December 1822. The following year, Lucy Aikin published Memoir of John Aikin, M.D., with a selection of Miscellaneous Pieces, Biographical, Moral and Critical.

== Bibliography ==
- Observations on the external use of preparations of lead, with some general remarks on topical medicines, 1772
- Biographical memoirs of medicine in Great Britain from the revival of literature to the time of Harvey, 1780
- England delineated, or, A geographical description of every county in England and Wales. With a concise account of its most important products, natural and artificial : for the use of young persons, 1790
- A view of the character and public services of the late John Howard, Esq. LL.D. F.R.S., 1792
- Miscellaneous pieces, in prose, by John Aikin, M.D. and Anna Laetitia Barbauld (1792)
- Evenings at Home (1792–95)
- Letters from a father to his son, on various topics, relative to literature and the conduct of life (1794)
- A Description of the Country from Thirty to Forty Miles Round Manchester (1795) referenced in The German Ideology by Karl Marx
- General Biography, or lives, critical and historical, of the most eminent persons of all ages, countries, conditions, and professions, arranged according to alphabetical orde. Chiefly composed by John Aikin, M.D. and the late Rev. William Enfield, L (10 volumes, 1799 and completed in 1815)
  - Volume the first
  - Volume the second
  - Volume the third
  - Volume the fourth
  - Volume the fifth
  - Volume the sixth
  - Volume the seventh
  - Volume the eighth
  - Volume the ninth
  - Volume the tenth
- Essays on songwriting. With a collection of such english songs as are most eminent for poetical merit by John Aikin. A new edition, with additions and corrections, and a supplement, by R.H. Evans. 1810
- A View of the Life, Travels, and Philanthropic Labours of the Late John Howard, 1814
- Annals of the Reign of King George the Third (1816)
- Select Works of the British Poets (1820)
- The calendar of nature: designed for the instruction and entertainment of young persons, 1822
- Memoir of John Aikin, M.D. Vol. I; Vol II, 1823. By Lucy Aikin
- The Juvenile Budget Re-opened: Being Further Selections from the Writings of Doctor John Aikin, 1847
