= Palgrave Academy =

Former school in Suffolk, England

Palgrave Academy was an early dissenting academy, that is, a school or college set up by English Dissenters. It was run from 1774 to 1785 in Palgrave, Suffolk - on the border of Norfolk - by the married couple Anna Laetitia Barbauld and her husband Rochemont Barbauld, a minister. The academy attracted parents who wished an alternative to traditional education for their sons.

== Beginnings ==
Anna Laetitia Barbauld was born into the tradition of the so-called dissenting academies, as her father John Aikin taught first at Kibworth Academy, where she received a better education than most girls and women of the day, and then at the renowned Warrington Academy, known as "the Athens of the North" for its stimulating intellectual atmosphere. Rochemont Barbauld, the grandson of a Huguenot (French Dissenter), had been a pupil there; the couple married in 1774 and moved to Suffolk, near where Rochemont had been offered a congregation and this school for boys.

The couple spent eleven years teaching at Palgrave Academy. Early on, Anna Laetitia Barbauld was not only responsible for running her own household but also the school's—she was accountant, maid, and housekeeper.

The school opened with only eight boys, but when the Barbaulds left in 1785, around forty were enrolled, a testament to the excellent reputation the school had acquired. The Barbaulds' educational philosophy attracted Anglicans as well as Dissenters. Palgrave replaced the strict discipline of traditional schools such as Eton, which often used corporal punishment, with a system of "fines and jobations" and even, it seems likely, "juvenile trials", that is trials run by and for the pupils themselves. Moreover, instead of the traditional classical studies, the school offered a practical curriculum that stressed science and the modern languages. Mrs Barbauld taught the foundation subjects of reading and religion to the youngest boys and geography, history, composition, rhetoric, and science to the older boys. She also produced a "weekly chronicle" for the school and wrote theatrical pieces for the pupils to perform.

== Alumni ==
A number of distinguished parents enrolled their boys at Palgrave, including the nephew of Lady Jane McCarthy, daughter of Prime Minister John Stuart, 3rd Earl of Bute, King George III's favourite. Pupils who later distinguished themselves include Lord Chief Justice Thomas Denman, 1st Baron Denman, scholar and translator William Taylor, settler of early Canada Thomas Douglas, 5th Earl of Selkirk, and archaeologist Sir William Gell. Barbauld had a profound effect on many of her students; Taylor, a preeminent scholar of German literature, referred to her as "the mother of my mind". Supporting the school was Norwich matriarch Sarah Martineau (née Meadows) (1725-1800) whose youngest son, Thomas Martineau (1764–1826), was one of the earliest boys enrolled at the academy. Sarah's brother, Philip Meadows (1719–83), a solicitor from nearby Diss provided financial support for the school.

== See also ==
- List of dissenting academies (1660–1800)
