= The Parables of Our Lord and Saviour Jesus Christ =

1768 work by Christopher Smart

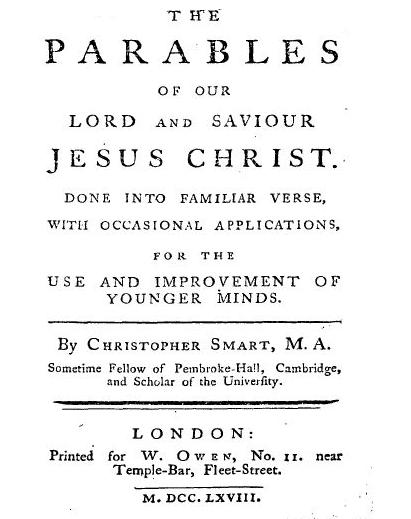
Title page of Parables

The Parables of Our Lord and Saviour Jesus Christ Done into Familiar Verse, with Occasional Applications, for the Use and Improvement of Younger Minds was written by Christopher Smart and published in 1768. The Parables are a collection of parables from the Bible, which includes lessons from both the Old Testament and the New Testament. The book depicts the parables in verse form.

The Parables, as with Hymns for the Amusement of Children, was part of Smart's attempt to create Christian religious literature dedicated to children.

== Background ==
The Parables were printed in March 1768 and were advertised in the London Chronicle on 31 March 1768. They were dedicated to the young son of Christopher Smart's friend, Bonnell Thornton. Bonnell Thorton was a close friend of Christopher Smart, and he worked with Smart on The Student magazine and supported Smart during and after his time in a mental asylum. In the dedication, Smart wrote:

"There are sundry Instances of our Blessed SAVIOUR'S Fondness for Children, as a Man; and He has assured us, we can have no Part in Him without imitating their Innocence and Simplicity. This is so evident, that though you are yet scarce three Years of Age, you will soon be able to read and understand it: and in a Season will reflect, I trust, with Pleasure that you have been the Patron of a well-intended Work, almost as soon as you could go alone..."

However, this dedication to a child of three incurred a review from the Monthly Review stating, "This version of the parables is, with great properiety, dedicated to Master Bonnell George Thorton: a child of three years old", which was intended to mock the simplicity of the Parables. The Critical Review simply stated that the work revealed Christopher Smart's poetry as being "unequal" and of "the lower class", and while it "may certainly be of use" to children, it could not "please their imaginations, or improve their taste in poetry."

== Parables of Our Lord ==
Like the Hymns for the Amusement of Children, Smart's The Parables of Our Lord and Saviour Jesus Christ were designed to teach morals to the young. However, Smart believed that salvation would not require a strong intellectual understanding of the Bible. In order to fulfill this belief, Smart created his Parables by altering the original Biblical parables, in order to simplify them and help them "make sense", and followed up each parable with a short explanation. Although there are many alterations and additions, Smart stays true to his Biblical sources, or, at least, how they are translated in the Authorized Version once the language was modernized for an 18th-century audience.

Since the Parables were written with the aim of teaching, Todd Parker claims that the Parables, and the other religious works of Christopher Smart, are part of his final push for the "evangelization of London's reading public." Even if they were not spreading an "evangelical" message, the books were still intended to promote proper conduct. In addition to teaching Christianity, the parables are set up against the interpretations of Bible held by the Roman Catholic Church and against the Roman Church itself.

Most of the Parables come from traditional Christian Parables, but Smart extended the original interpretation of what a "parable" is to include any "parabolic discourse" that could convey Christian doctrine "through, or with the aid of, similes, metaphors, proverbs, and other indirect forms of expression." Christopher Smart is not alone in interpreting parables in this manner because the Old Testament tradition of parables "meant first of all a comparison of some kind, but... included a wide variety of metaphires, similitudes, riddles, mysteries and illustrations."

== See also ==
- Hymns and Spiritual Songs
- A Song to David
- Full Text of The Parables
