= 1753 in literature =

This article contains information about the literary events and publications of 1753.

== Events ==
- c. January – Mercy Seccombe, having emigrated from Harvard, Massachusetts to Nova Scotia, Canada, begins the earliest recorded diary by a woman in North America.
- February 1 – Christopher Smart makes his last contribution to the Paper War of 1752–1753, with The Hilliad, which one critic, Lance Bertelsen, describes as the "loudest broadside" of the war.
- February 2 – Jane Austen's aunt Philadelphia, mother of Eliza de Feuillide, marries Tysoe Saul Hancock in India.
- March 25 – Voltaire leaves the court of Frederik II of Prussia
- December – The Paper War of 1752–1753 comes to a close, with the withdrawal of everyone except John Hill

== New books ==
=== Fiction ===
- Sarah Fielding – The Adventures of David Simple, Volume the Last
- Eliza Haywood – The History of Jemmy and Jenny
- Abbé Prévost – Manon Lescaut (Histoire du Chevalier des Grieux, et de Manon Lescaut, 2nd edn, 1st authorised as separate publication)
- Samuel Richardson – The History of Sir Charles Grandison
- Tobias Smollett – The Adventures of Ferdinand Count Fathom

=== Drama ===
- Giacomo Casanova – La Moluccheide
- Kitty Clive – The Rehearsal
- Samuel Foote – The Englishman in Paris
- Richard Glover – Boadicea
- Carlo Goldoni
  - The Mistress of the Inn (La locandiera)
  - Servant of Two Masters (Il servitore di due padroni, revised)
- Henry Jones – The Earl of Essex
- Edward Moore – The Gamester
- Voltaire – L'Orphelin de la Chine
- Edward Young – The Brothers

=== Poetry ===
- John Armstrong – Taste
- Thomas Cooke – An Ode on Benevolence
- Robert Dodsley – Public Virtue
- Thomas Franklin – Translation
- Richard Gifford – Contemplation
- Thomas Gray and Richard Bentley the younger – Designs by Mr. R. Bently for Six Poems by Mr. T. Gray
- Henry Jones – Merit
- William Kenrick – The Whole Duty of Woman
- Heyat Mahmud – Hitaggyānbāṇī; Bengali
- Christopher Smart – The Hilliad
- Thomas Warton – The Union
- George Whitefield – Hymns for Social Worship

=== Non-fiction ===
- Theophilus Cibber – The Lives of the Poets
- Jane Collier – An Essay on the Art of Ingeniously Tormenting
- William Hogarth – The Analysis of Beauty
- David Hume – Essays and Treatises
- Charlotte Lennox – Shakespear Illustrated, or, The novels and histories on which the plays of Shakespear are founded, vol. 1
- Christopher Pitt et al. – The Works of Virgil in Latin and English
- Thomas Richards of Coychurch – Antiquæ linguæ Britannicæ thesaurus
- Henry St. John – A Letter to Sir William Windham
- John Toland – Hypatia
- William Warburton – The Principles of Natural and Revealed Religion

== Births ==
- March 8 – William Roscoe, English historian and miscellaneous writer (died 1831)
- March 13 – József Fabchich, Hungarian translator of Greek and lexicographer (died 1809)
- April 8 – Pigault-Lebrun, French novelist and playwright (died 1835)
- April 11 – Sophia Burrell, English poet and dramatist (died 1802)
- May 8 – Phillis Wheatley, African-American poet (died 1784)
- June 26 – Antoine de Rivarol, French Royalist writer (died 1801)
- July 8 – Ann Yearsley, née Cromartie, English poet, writer and library proprietor (died 1806)
- August 11 – Thomas Bewick, English engraver, writer and natural historian (died 1828)
- September 16 – Märta Helena Reenstierna, Swedish diarist (died 1841)
- October 15 – Elizabeth Inchbald, English novelist, dramatist and actress (died 1821)
- October 16 – Johann Gottfried Eichhorn, German Protestant theologian (died 1827)

== Deaths ==
- January 14 – Bishop George Berkeley, Irish philosopher (born 1685)
- May 11 – Jean-Joseph Languet de Gergy, French theologian (born 1677)
- May 23 – Franciszka Urszula Radziwiłłowa, Polish dramatist (born 1705)
- June 13 – Marie Huber, Swiss theologian, editor and translator (born 1695)
- September 18 – Hristofor Zhefarovich, Macedonian artist and poet (date of birth unknown)
- November – Giuseppe Valentini, Italian poet, composer and painter (born 1681)
- November 24 – Nicholas Mann, English antiquarian (date of birth unknown)
- Unknown date – John Richardson, English Quaker preacher and autobiographer (born 1667)
