= Hymns in Prose for Children =

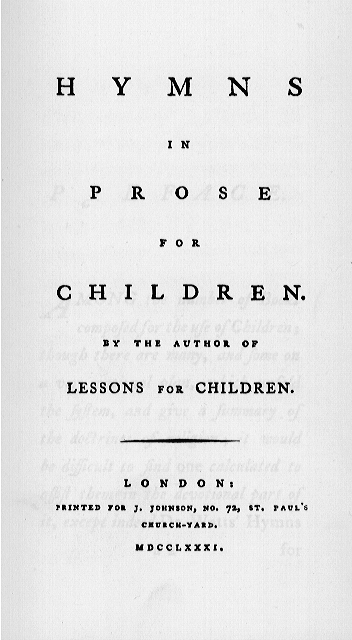
- Title page from Hymns in Prose
- Author: Anna Laetitia Barbauld
- Publication date: January 1, 1781

Hymns in Prose for Children (1781) is a children's book by Anna Laetitia Barbauld.

== Biographical background ==
Barbauld and her husband were concerned that they would never have a child of their own and in 1775, after only a year of marriage, Barbauld suggested to her brother, John Aikin, that they adopt one of his children:

I am sensible it is not a small thing we ask; nor can it be easy for a parent to part with a child. This I would say, from a number, one may more easily be spared. Though it makes a very material difference in happiness whether a person has children or no children, it makes, I apprehend, little or none whether he has three, or four; five, or six; because four or five are enow [sic] to exercise all his whole stock of care and affection. We should gain, but you would not lose.

Eventually her brother conceded and the couple adopted Charles; it was for him that Barbauld wrote her most famous books: Lessons for Children (1778–9) and Hymns in Prose for Children (1781).

== Literary analysis ==
Barbauld’s Lessons for Children and Hymns in Prose for Children were a revolution in children’s literature. For the first time, the needs of the child reader were seriously considered. Barbauld demanded that her books be printed in large type with wide margins so that children could easily read them and, even more importantly, she developed a style of “informal dialogue between parent and child” that would dominate children’s literature for a generation.

== Legacy ==
Lessons for Children and Hymns in Prose had, for children’s books, an unprecedented impact; not only did they influence the poetry of William Blake and William Wordsworth, they were also used to teach several generations of school children. Although both Samuel Johnson and Charles James Fox ridiculed Barbauld’s children’s books and believed that she was wasting her talents, Barbauld herself believed that such writing was noble and she encouraged others to follow in her footsteps. As Betsy Rodgers, her biographer explains, “she gave prestige to the writing of juvenile literature, and by not lowering her standard of writing for children, she inspired others to write on a similar high standard.” In fact, because of Barbauld, Sarah Trimmer and Hannah More were inspired to write for poor children as well as organize a large-scale Sunday School movement, Ellenor Fenn wrote and designed a series of readers and games for middle-class children and Richard Lovell Edgeworth began one of the first systematic studies of childhood development which would culminate in not only an educational treatise authored by Maria Edgeworth and himself but also in a large body of children’s stories by Maria herself.

== See also ==
- Divine Songs Attempted in Easy Language for the Use of Children by Isaac Watts, 1715
- Hymns for the Amusement of Children by Christopher Smart, 1771
- Hymns for Little Children by Cecil Frances Alexander, 1848
