= The Covent-Garden Journal =

1752 English literary periodical

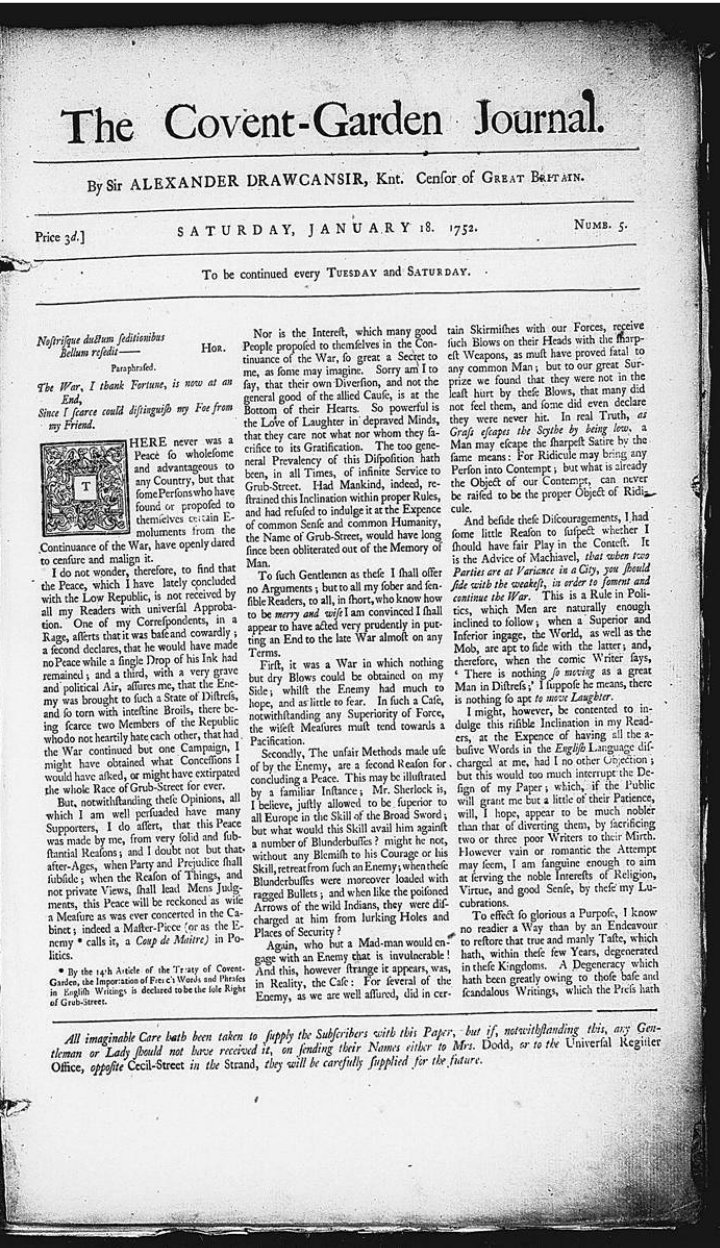
The January 18, 1752, Number 5 issue of The Covent-Garden Journal

The Covent-Garden Journal (modernised as The Covent Garden Journal) was an English literary periodical published twice a week for most of 1752. It was edited and almost entirely funded by novelist, playwright, and essayist Henry Fielding, under the pseudonym, "Sir Alexander Drawcansir, Knt. Censor of Great Britain". It was Fielding's fourth and final periodical, and one of his last written works.

The Journal incited the "Paper War" of 1752–1753, a conflict among a number of contemporary literary critics and writers, which began after Fielding declared war on the "armies of Grub Street" in the first issue. His proclamation attracted multiple aggressors and instigated a long-lasting debate argued in the pages of their respective publications. Initially waged for the sake of increasing sales, the Paper War ultimately became much larger than Fielding had expected and generated a huge volume of secondary commentary and literature.

Further controversy erupted in June, when Fielding expressed support for a letter decrying the government's 1751 Disorderly Houses Act 1751 (25 Geo. 2. c. 36) in the Journal. His remarks were viewed by the public as an endorsement of the legality of prostitution, and it soon became common opinion that the letter, initially attributed to a "Humphrey Meanwell", was in fact written by Fielding. Fielding refuted this assertion in the 1 August issue of the Journal, while labelling prostitutes a source of social evils.

The final issue of the Journal was released on 25 November 1752. In its last months, poor sales had resulted in a transition from semi-weekly to weekly release. Ill-health and a disinclination to continue led Fielding to end its run after the Number 72 issue. He died two years later while staying in Lisbon, Portugal.

== Background ==
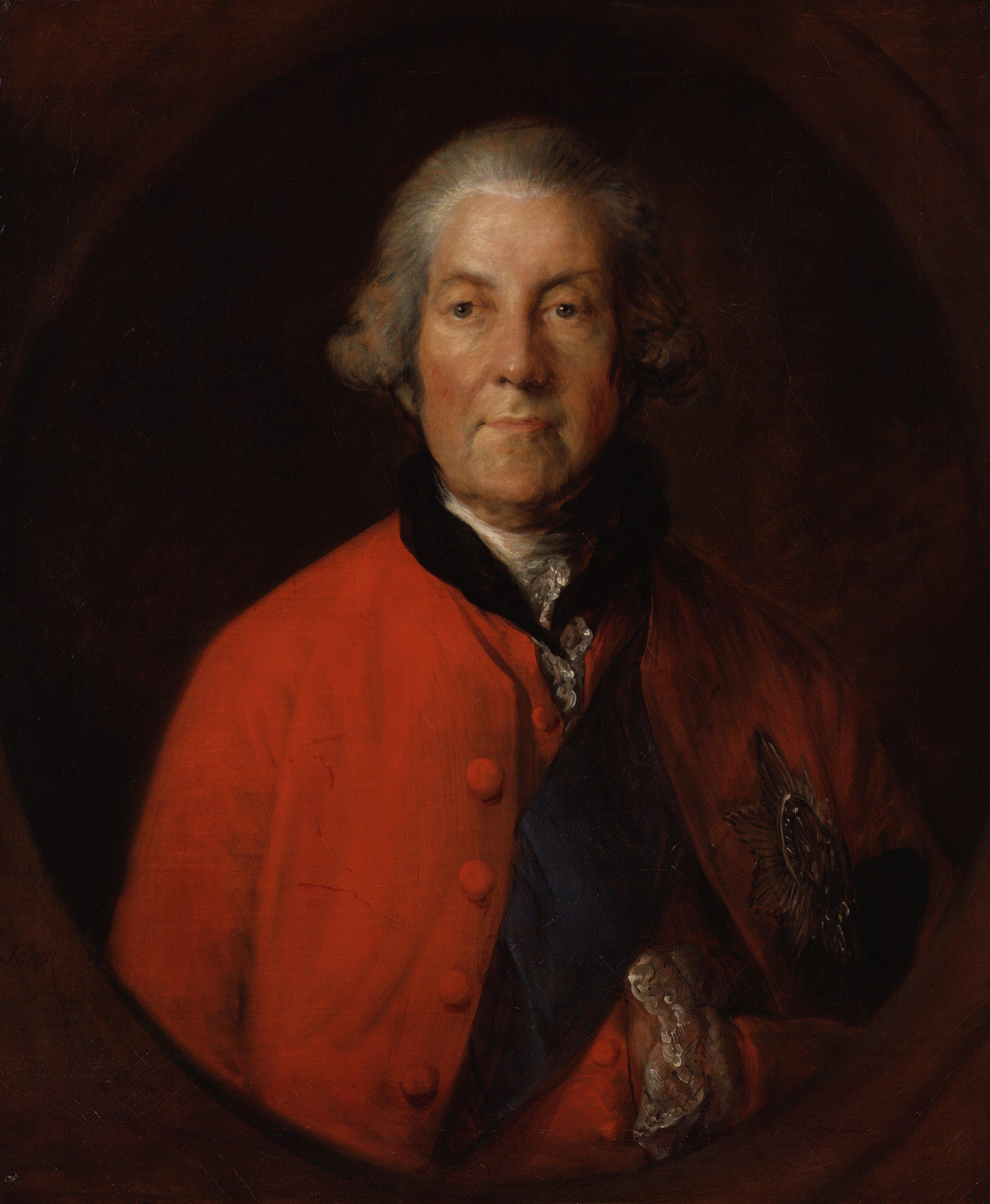
The Duke of Bedford, responsible for the hoax pamphlet entitled The Covent-Garden Journal

The first mention of The Covent-Garden Journal dates to 5 December 1749, when a broadsheet pamphlet was printed with the title "The Covent-Garden Journal. No 1. To be published'd Once every Month, during the present Westminster Election by Paul Wronghead, of the Fleet, Esq." It was organized as a standard paper, with sections called "Introductory Essay", "Foreign Affairs", "Home Affairs", and "Advertisement". Published with a list of fake printers (T. Smith, R. Webb, and S. Johnson), it claimed that the sellers were "all the People of London and Westminster". It was later revealed that the paper was created as a hoax by the Duke of Bedford to mock Sir George Vandeput, 2nd Baronet and his supporters during the 1750 Westminster by-election.

The printer, Richard Francklin, ran off 13,000 copies on 5–6 December, only one of which still survives. Although the true author of the pamphlet remains uncertain, it was believed at the time to be Fielding's work. Later critics, such as Martin and Ruthe Battestin, cite a letter written on behalf of the Duke of Richmond that was used as evidence of Fielding's involvement.

Dated 7 December 1749, the letter states: "The enclosed is a paper generally given to Mr. Fielding, as the author. The humor that is in it is at least akin to his. It may possibly divert you & your company." Fielding's authorship would have been limited to the paper's introduction, which was used to target prominent Tories such as Paul Whitehead: a minor poet who had pseudonymously attacked Fielding before and was vocal on political issues.

In late 1751, just before the publication of his novel, Amelia, Fielding began plotting his next literary work. He expressed a desire to use a periodical to promote the Universal Register Office – a business which connected service providers with consumers – and his other activities and views. Alluding to the earlier publication, he gave it the title The Covent-Garden Journal, and announced in The Daily Advertiser that the first number would be issued on 23 November 1751. The release was delayed until January because of work related to the publication of Amelia.

At the time of the publication of the journal, Covent Garden, although formally associated with the theatre industry, was more widely known as London's red light district. Fielding had earlier written The Covent Garden Tragedy, a mock-tragic play concerning the tale of two prostitutes.

== Content ==
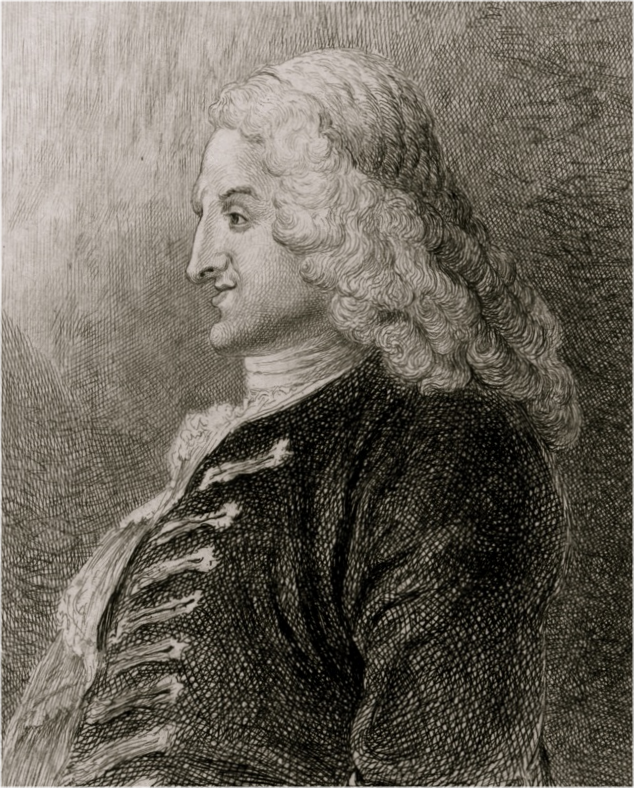
Henry Fielding, editor of The Covent-Garden Journal

The first number of the periodical was published on 4 January 1752, and sold at a price of three pence. For most of its run, the journal was issued twice a week, on Tuesday and Saturday. Each number consisted of an introductory remark or essay (written by Fielding), domestic and foreign news with annotations, advertisements, an obituary, a births and marriages panel, and other sundries.

One section, entitled "Covent Garden", concerned Fielding's position as a magistrate at Bow Street. The column ran in every issue until 27 June 1752, appearing irregularly thereafter. It dealt with crime and legal matters and provided insight into the cases that Fielding dealt with on a regular basis, but the presentation was less organized and more informal than standard legal records. Most of the information on the cases was provided by Joshua Brogden, one of Fielding's clerks.

Particularly in the opening comment and the news, Fielding injected a degree of wit or "liveliness" not seen in his previous publications. He stated in the first number that he planned to avoid the "dullness" seen in other contemporary periodicals:

I do promise, as far as in me lies, to avoid with the utmost Care all Kind of Encroachment on that spacious Field, in which my ... Contemporaries have such large and undoubted Possessions; and which, from Time immemorial, hath been called the Land of Dullness.

Discussion in the Journal was chiefly concerned with matters of literary criticism, and "the social and moral health of the body politic". Most of the opening essays took a decidedly unpolitical tone. Exceptions were those in numbers 42, 50, and 58. Number 42 mocked the Country Tories by imagining how an Ancient Greek or Roman would react to party politics: "... convey [him] to a Hunting-Match, or Horse Race, or any other Meeting of Patriots. Will he not immediately conclude from all the Roaring and Ranting, the Hallowing and the Hazzaing, the Gaming and Drinking, ... that he is actually present at the Orgia of Bacchus, or the Celebration of some such Festival?" Number 50 blamed the growth of the London mob on poverty laws. Number 58 targeted the "Independent Electors of Westminster".

In his literary reviews, Fielding often wrote with a biased hand. For instance, he gave immoderate praise to Charlotte Lennox's The Female Quixote and Charles Macklin's two-act comic play The Covent Garden Theatre, or Paquin Turn'd Drawcansir. Lennox and Macklin were long-time friends of Fielding, and Macklin's play was based on Fielding's life. Fielding had a noted tendency to be prejudiced toward certain authors too – Rabelais and Aristophanes were always met harshly, while Jonathan Swift, Miguel de Cervantes, and Lucian were praised as a "great Triumvirate".

Samuel Richardson's Clarissa – published in 1748 and one of the longest novels in the English language – is a noted exception: it was received well, even though Fielding considered Richardson a literary rival, and despite Richardson's calling the periodical "The Common Garden Journal". Fielding lauded the work of friend William Hogarth and poetry by Edward Young. He also promoted plays involving David Garrick and James Lacy, among others.

Fielding frequently used the periodical to respond to criticism for his latest novel, Amelia, which was published in December 1751. The 25 and 28 January issues featured a section in which Amelia's most outspoken critics were depicted on trial and in which Fielding systematically repudiated their respective complaints. "Councillor Town", the fictional prosecutor, summarised these complaints in saying, "The whole Book is a Heap of sad Stuff, Dulness, and Nonsense; that it contains no Wit, Humour, Knowledge of human Nature, or of the World; indeed, that the Fable, moral Character, Manners, Sentiments, and Diction, are all alike bad and contemptible." In his reply, Fielding posited a paternal relationship with Amelia, though conceded that it was not without flaws:

... [N]ay, when I go father, and avow, that of all my Offspring she is my favourite Child. I can truly say that I bestowed a more than ordinary Pains in her Education ... I do not think my Child is entirely free from Faults. I know nothing human that is so; but surely she doth not deserve the Rancour with which she hath been treated by the Public.

Fielding's efforts only attracted further criticism, eventually resulting in his promise "to write no more novels".

=== Paper War ===
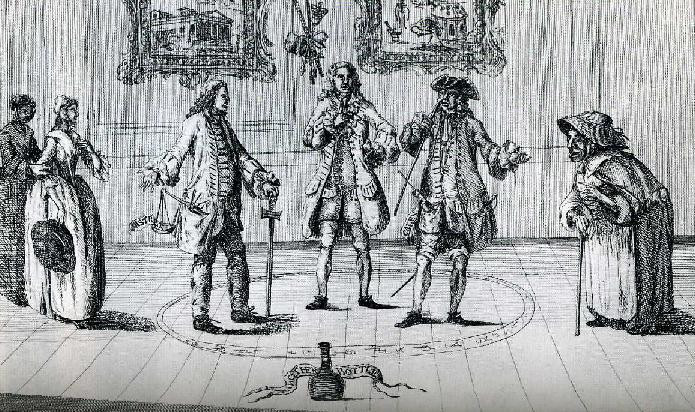
A depiction of the Paper War and its participants, from The Conjurers (1753), from right to left: Elizabeth Canning, Henry Fielding, Crisp Gascoyne, John Hill, and Mary Squires

The first four numbers of the Journal featured Fielding's contributions to the "Paper War", a conflict he instigated with writers of other contemporary periodicals to generate sales. In the first number, along with the promise to avoid the dullness of other periodicals, Fielding confronted "the armies of Grub Street" and proclaimed his disdain for the literary critics of the day:

"As to my brother authors, who, like mere mechanics, are envious and jealous of a rival in their trade, to silence their jealousies and fears, I declare that it is not my intention to encroach on the business now carried on by them, nor to deal in any of those wares which they at present vend to the public." Also given in the inaugural number was "An introduction to a journal of the present paper-war between the forces under Sir Alexander Drawcansir, and the army of Grub Street", written in the tradition of Jonathan Swift's Battle of the Books.

The main response to Fielding's words came from John Hill, an English author, botanist, and literary critic who wrote a column called "The Inspector" in the London Daily Advertiser. Hill used this column approximately one week later to attack Fielding and criticise Amelia. Fielding replied in much the same fashion in the second issue of the Journal, while attempting to defend his novel. The two engaged in a sustained dispute, as each used their respective publication to joust with the other.

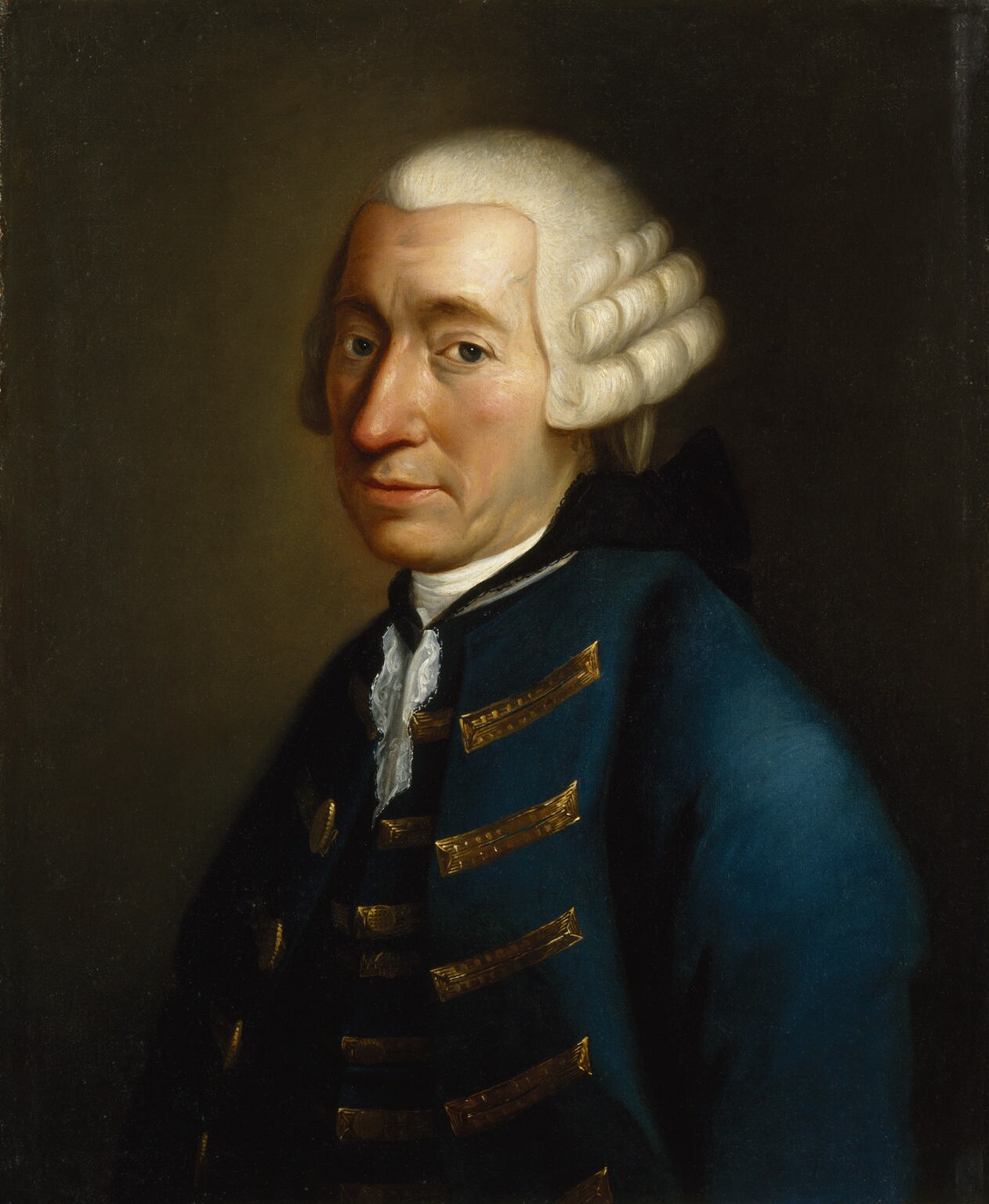
Tobias Smollett was one of the literary critics who took part in Fielding's Paper War

Several others were quick to join Hill in his criticism of Fielding and the Grub Street campaign. Bonnell Thornton, a poet and essayist, was responsible for Have at you All; or, the Drury Lane Journal, a production that satirised Fielding and his works. Particular attention was paid to Amelia in Have at you All; the fifth number, for example, featured "a new chapter in Amelia, more witty than the rest, if the reader has but sense enough to find out the humour."

On 15 January, Tobias Smollett published a disparaging twenty-eight-page pamphlet entitled A Faithful Narrative of the base and inhuman Arts that were lately practised upon the Brain of Habbakuk Hilding, Justice, Dealer and Chapman, who now lies at his own House in Covent-Garden, in a deplorable State of Lunacy; a dreadful Monument of false Friendship and Delusion. The pamphlet was notorious for its viciousness, and accused "Habbakuk Hilding" (Fielding) of literary theft, scandalousness, and smuttiness, while deriding his marriage to Mary Daniels. It posited that Fielding founded The Covent-Garden Journal to further the ambitions of politician and statesman George Lyttelton, with whom Fielding had recently formed a friendship. The source of this inference remains unclear, since Lyttelton received no particular mention in the first few numbers.

Fielding withdrew from the conflict after the fourth number, for the "war" had become more personal and hostile than he had originally intended. Although The Covent-Garden Journal would no longer feature a section on the Paper War, a similar but more moderated commentary that Fielding termed the "Court of Criticism" later took its place. The Paper War continued without Fielding, ultimately embroiling a large number of other writers, among them Christopher Smart, William Kenrick, and Arthur Murphy. Having generated a significant amount of secondary literature (including Smart's The Hilliad and Charles Macklin's aforementioned The Covent Garden Theater, or Pasquin Turn'd Drawcansir), the Paper War ended without victor in 1753.

=== Meanwell affair ===
In 1749, a court decision made by Fielding – in his role as magistrate – provoked rumours that he was being paid to defend brothels. In 1752 a letter written by "Humphry Meanwell" voiced objection to the Disorderly Houses Act 1751 (25 Geo. 2. c. 36), which was intended to remove prostitutes and brothels from Britain.

The public soon associated this letter with Fielding. His publication of what was seen as an endorsement of the letter in the 22 June issue strengthened this feeling: "The following Letter which was sent to the Justice by an unknown Hand, hath been transmitted to us; and tho' perhaps some Points are carried a little too far, upon the whole I think it a very sensible Performance, and worthy the Attention of the Public." The text of the letter itself followed this note and was published in the "Covent Garden" section of the journal.

Fielding responded to the claims that he wrote the letter in the 1 August issue of the Journal. While acknowledging that his association with the letter had made him popular with prostitutes, he went on to accuse them of being a source for social evils:

Prostitutes are the lowest and meanest, so are they the basest, vilest, and wickedest of all Creatures. It is a trite Observation, that when a Woman quits her Modesty, she discards with it every other Virtue. To extend this to every frail Individual of the Sex, is to carry it too far; but if it be confined to those who are become infamous by public Prostitution, no Maxim, I believe, hath a greater Foundation in Truth, or will be more strongly verified by Experience.

Martin Battestin believes that this passage is indicative of the fact that while Fielding was opposed to prostitution, "when actually confronted with the pitiable wretches accused of such crimes and misdemeanors ... he acted toward them with the compassion and good-humored tolerance that characterize the treatment of the 'lower orders' in his novels." To critic Lance Bertelsen, the passage "seems to reveal a lurking fascination with the oldest profession – one that, paired with his earlier endorsement of "Meanwell", suggests a writer oscillating between outrage and sympathy, humor and lechery."

== End of publication ==
By the summer of 1752, the Journal's circulation was dropping steadily and it was losing popularity. After making the transition to weekly publication on 4 July, it was advertised less, and, in the final months of 1752, its discussion of anything other than court decisions and political actions was minimal. In addition, Fielding's health was deteriorating and his inclination to continue the periodical had declined.

The 72nd and final number of The Covent-Garden Journal was published on 25 November 1752. Fielding there confirmed his lack of interest: "I shall here lay down a paper which I have neither inclination nor leisure to carry on any longer." He directed readers to turn their attention to The Public Advertiser, a new periodical to be released on 1 December and to replace The Daily Advertiser. His final statement in the Journal was, "I solemnly declare that unless in revising my former Works, I have at present no Intention to hold any further Correspondence with the gayer Muses."

Fielding died approximately two years later, his death caused by the gout and asthma that had, in part, compelled him to end the Journal's run. In his final year, he travelled to Portugal in the hope of recovery. He wrote an account of his travels during this time, entitled The Journal of a Voyage to Lisbon, which was published in England in 1755. Fielding died in Lisbon on 8 October 1754, and was buried in the Os Cyprestes cemetery, a local English burial ground.

== See also ==
- 1752 in literature
