= The Hilliad =

Poem

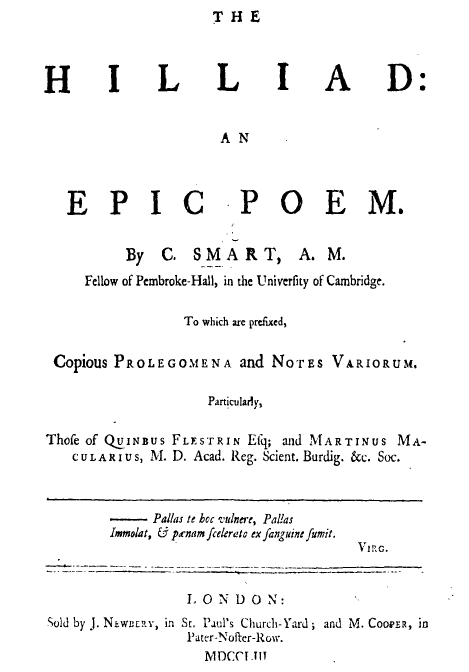
Title page of The Hilliad 1753

The Hilliad was Christopher Smart's mock epic poem written as a literary attack upon John Hill on 1 February 1753. The title is a play on Alexander Pope's The Dunciad with a substitution of Hill's name, which represents Smart's debt to Pope for the form and style of The Hilliad as well as a punning reference to the Iliad. In "Book the First" of The Hilliad, Hillario is seduced by a Sibyl to give up his career as an apothecary and instead becomes a writer. However, his fortune quickly descends with Hillario ultimately turning into the "arch-dunce".

The origins of the work come from a dispute between Hill and Henry Fielding; a "paper war" that involved a widespread literary dispute, Hill turned his attention to Smart and published attacks upon Smart's Poems on Several Occasions. In response, Smart wrote The Hilliad, claiming it as the "balance due" on Hill's treatment towards his person and poetry. The work was responded to by multiple parties, but it was the last major contribution of Smart in the literary conflict and attacks upon Smart soon ceased.

Although the work is only of one book that is 259 lines long, its "Notes Variorum" attached to the work more than doubles the length. It is unknown who contributed to the notes, but it is thought that Smart, along with Arthur Murphy and Henry Fielding, put them together.

== Background ==
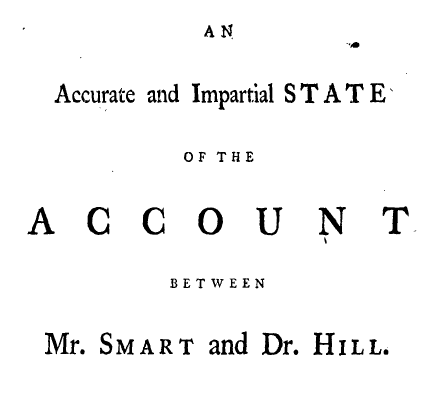
"Account between Mr. Smart and Dr. Hill", a summary of Hill's criticism on Smart

During 1751, Smart was involved with the Old Woman's Oratory and devoted a substantial portion of his time putting together that production and his other comedic works. However, the Oratory was controversial and caused Smart a great deal of stress. It was under these conditions that he tried to publish his collection of poems, Poems on Several Occasions, 1752. Before the publication of the Poems, Henry Fielding and John Hill were involved with a dispute involving many London writers.

Henry Fielding started a "paper war" in the first issue of The Covent-Garden Journal (4 January 1752) against "hack writers". In response, John Hill claimed in the London Daily Advertiser (9 January 1752) that Henry Fielding proposed a fake paper war that would involve them "giving Blows that would not hurt, and sharing the Advantage in Silence." Such an event is believed to have occurred (if it occurred) on 28 December 1751. Regardless of the merits of either sides' claims, a war began that drew in many authors, such as Christopher Smart, Bonnell Thornton, William Kenrick, Arthur Murphy, and Tobias Smollett.

However, both Hill and Fielding had previously attacked Philip D'Halluin, and D'Halluin hired Bonnell Thorton, a friend of Smart's, to respond in kind. Not far after Thorton's involvement in the dispute, a pamphlet in the London Daily Advertiser called The March of the Lion, 29 January 1752, introduces Smart via a reference to his "Mrs. Mary Midnight" pseudonym, although Smart was not yet a participant.

During this conflict, Smart tried to publish his first collection, and the 851 people subscribers to Smart's Poems could not keep it from coming under attack. In the August 1752 Monthly Review, Hill derided the Poems and singled out The Hop-Garden for a particularly harsh review. Combined with other attacks, Hill began to provoke Smart into a literary conflict. On 11 November 1752, Smart announced his production of The Hilliad in the Gray's-Inn Journal.

Before the dispute, Smart had a mixed relationship with Hill, but had a generally positive, lighthearted view of Fielding and his works. Although Smart previously wrote "pro" and "anti" Fielding articles, it is possible that Smart was pushed towards writing The Hilliad by Arthur Murphy or Fielding. By December 1752, Smart was reading excerpts of the mock-epic poem "at Alehouses and Cyder Cellars" according to The Inspector of 7 December 1752. The Hilliad was first published on 1 February 1753 (London) and later in May (Dublin).

== The Hilliad ==
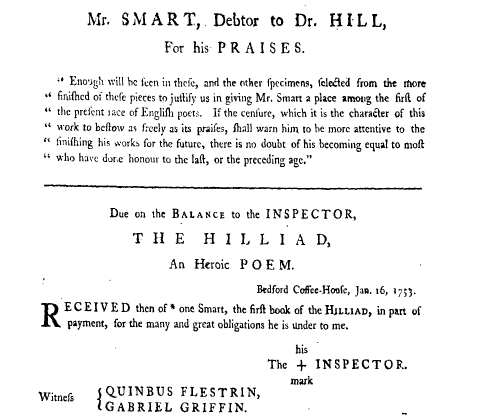
"Balance" on Hill's attacks

The Hilliad is prefaced by a letter from Smart and a reply possibly written by Murphy. Both seek to draw connections between The Hilliad and the works of Alexander Pope and Fielding that criticize the "corruption" of modern writers. Following these letters is a "Prolegomena to the Hilliad" that claims to be an "extract from a paper called the Impertinent. Published Aug. 13, 1752. Written by Dr. Hill." The "extract" included an attack upon Smart. Following this "extract" is another from the August 1752 Gentleman's Magazine page 387 that responds to Hill's piece.

Included in the work is "An Accurate and Impartial STATE of the ACCOUNT Between Mr. Smart and Dr. Hill." The "account" includes 12 essays, six by Hill that claims Smart as his "debtor" for various "praises" and six that are "per contra creditor" over "his abuse". Although the "account" compiles all of the essays together, the original essay written by Hill was published 9 March 1751 and was not followed until 13 August 1752. At one point, John Newbery actually included a publisher's note to directly attack Hill's claims that he helped establish Smart by introducing the young poet to Newbery. The reason for adding the twelve "accounts" becomes clear when the editor ads the essays together and claim that The Hilliad is "Due on the Balance to the INSPECTOR." Although the "accounts" are satirically laid out, according to Lance Bertelsen, they represent "precisely the exchange of praise and abuse, and the notoriety established by such exchanges, that generated sales that put shillings in capricious hungry authors' pockets."

=== Book One ===
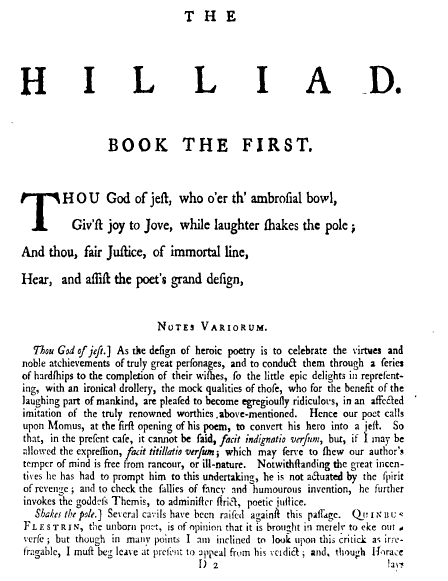
First page

The work is supported by a series of "Notes Variorum", a set of footnotes that nearly double the length of the work. They were likely written by Murphy, although possibly supplied directly by Smart. Years later, Jesse Foot described the creation of the notes as "Mr. Smart walking up and down the room, speaking the Verses, and Mr. Murphy writing the notes to them." However, it is quite possible that Fielding also contributed to the notes.

There are various pseudonyms used in the extensive footnotes that more than double the length of the work: "Quinbus Flestrin", of Swift origins, is a play-off of Samuel Derrick; "Martinus Macularius", from the word "macula" and a combination of "Martinus Scriblerus" of Pope's The Dunciad and of "Margelina Scribelinda Macularia" of Kenrick's Old Woman's Dunciad, is a play-off of Hill. Besides just drawing of names from two "Dunciads", the Dublin edition acknowledges that the work is an imitation of the original The Dunciad. Among the notes and verses, Smart praises various people, such as William Boyce, Fielding, Hogarth, and Garrick, while he attacked Henley and a Dr. Rock.

At the beginning of his poem, Smart addresses his subject, Hill/Hillario, by saying:

O thou, whatever name delight thine ear,
Pimp! Poet! Puffer! 'Pothecary! Play'r!
Whose baseless fame by vanity is buoy'd,
Like the huge earth self-center'd in the void,
Accept one part'ner thy own worth t'explore,
And in thy praise be singular no more. (The Hilliad lines 6-12)

These lines echo the lines of The Dunciad when Pope addresses Jonathan Swift as "Dean, Drapier, Bickerstaff, or Gulliver!" However, the lines could be self-referential because Smart, like Hill and Swift, used many titles himself.

The first action of the poem is of a Sybil that comes to Hillario:

A tawny Sybil, whose alluring song,
Decoy'd the 'prentices and maiden throng
First from the counter young HILLARIO charm'd (The Hilliad lines 6-12)

Her charms transform Hillario from an apothecary into "th' INSPECTOR" (The Hilliad line 58). She is reminiscent of Pope's Dulness character, although she also has traits deriving from Smart's "Mrs Midnight".

Hillario's transformation is only to doom him; he quickly becomes "The UNIVERSAL BUTT of all mankind" (The Hilliad line 237). The poem does not end there, but instead expands with Fame declaring:

"While in the vale perennial fountains flow,
And fragrant Zephyrs musically blow;
While the majestic sea from pole to pole,
In horrible magnificence shall roll,
While yonder glorious canopy on high,
Shall overhang the curtains of the sky,
While the gay seasons their due course shall run,
Ruled by the brilliant stars and golden sun,
While wit and fool antagonist shall be,
And sense and taste and nature shall agree,
While love shall live, and rapture shall rejoice,
Fed by the notes of Handel, Arne and Boyce,
While with joint force o'er humour's droll domain,
Cervantes, Fielding, Lucian, Swift shall reign,
While thinking figures from the canvass start,
And Hogarth is the Garrick of his art.
So long in flat stupidity's extreme,
Shall H-ll the' ARCH-DUNCE remain o'er every dunce supreme." (The Hilliad lines 242-259)

== Critical response ==
One of the first responses to the poem was a notice by Murphy in his Gray's Inn Journal on 20 January 1753 that claimed The Hilliad as "an excellent Poem upon a very bad Subject", but also states that Smart was ill. The negative reaction to Smart's mock-epic were quick to come but not necessarily harsh: Samuel Derrick responded directly with a satirical poem, The Smartiad in February 1753; Arthur Murphy, like Derrick, criticized Smart for his personally attacking Hill; and Rules for Being a Wit tried to provoke further response from Smart. However, Smart stopped responding to either of these assaults.

Instead, Smart, in the prologue of Fielding's The Mock Doctor, claimed to "throw the mask aside" and to stop writing under pseudonyms or responding in his previous manner. The prologue was not allowed to be performed with The Mock Doctor from an order by the Lord Chamberlain's office after it almost caused a riot, but it was printed in the Public Advertiser. Regardless, once the prologue was actually published, Smart gave up his career in satirical writing. Soon after, Smart's works in The Midwife, and other papers in which he Smart contributed under a pseudonym, were soon discontinued and his major source of income was ended. There was very little contemporary reaction to follow, as Smart seemed to have disappeared from all mention. Later, in 1999, Bertelsen emphasized the importance of Smart's The Hilliad by claiming it as the "loudest broadside" during the "paper war". Likewise, Bertelsen was not afraid to point out Smart's gain at Hill's expense when he claims Hill was sent "sinking down to posterity in the canon of one of the more important poets of the eighteenth century."

== See also ==
- John Hill
- Paper War of 1752–1753
- The Hop-Garden
