= Elizabeth Anne Le Noir =

English poet, novelist, feminist

- Born: Elizabeth Anne Smart; 27 October 1754; Islington, London
- Died: 6 May 1841 (aged 86); Priory, Caversham, England
- Occupations: novelist and poet
- Spouse: John Baptiste Le Noir (m. 1795; died 1835)

Elizabeth Anne Le Noir (née Smart; 27 October 1754 – 6 May 1841) was an English female poet, novelist, and feminist from the romantic period. Raised in a widowed home, Le Noir became interested in literature through opportunities she was given by her mother's step-father; John Newbery. After being employed at the Reading Mercury for some time, Le Noir and her sister eventually inherited it. Le Noir soon became the wife of Jean Baptiste Le Noir, from whom she got her last name. Although she didn't have any children of her own, she educated two of her female relatives. Although Le Noir had many great works, "[s]he is probably better known as the daughter of the famous religious poet Christopher Smart."

== Biography ==
=== Early life ===
In 1755, Elizabeth Anne Smart was born in Islington, London as the daughter of English poet Christopher Smart and Anna-Maria Carnan. Elizabeth was born into a household with her parents and sister Marianne Smart. Due to his failing career, Smart was unable to provide enough of an income to support his family. During the 1760s, Christopher Smart began to be labeled as an insane alcoholic and became incapable of caring for his wife and children. He was soon admitted into St Luke's Hospital for Lunatics as a "Curable Patient". In 1768, Smart was eventually confined permanently for insanity and later died at the King's Bench Prison in 1771. While Elizabeth Anne's father was imprisoned, she, her mother and sister settled in Reading, Berkshire in 1792 with her mother's step-father John Newbery, who cared for them. An English publisher, Newbery once supported the works of Christopher Smart, and employed the three women at the Reading Mercury, which he owned. Elizabeth and her sister later inherited the publication.

=== Adulthood ===
In 1795, Elizabeth Anne married a French immigrant, John Baptiste Le Noir. The couple settled together in Reading, where Baptiste worked as a French teacher while Elizabeth Anne took care of the house and educated two family members. Throughout her childhood, Le Noir's mother did not want her to pursue writing.

=== Career ===
Starting at a young age, Le Noir was exposed to writing. With the deep interest she gained for it, she published many poems and novels. To set her apart from others, Le Noir wrote novels with poems scattered among and between them with artistic backgrounds. Her work was very beautiful and was described by Mary Russell Mitford as the type of novels that were so interesting, that you had to keep reading and refrained from putting down. Le Noir's work was admired by many others who read her novels, such as Dr. Burney who praised her first novel written in 1803; Village Anecdotes, which was dedicated to him.

== Works ==
Her works include:

- 1803 Village Annals
- 1804 Village Anecdotes
- 1804 Victorine's Excursion
- 1808 Clara de Montfier'
- 1812 Conversations, interspersed with Poems, for the Amusement and Instruction of Youth
- 1825 Miscellaneous Poems, in two volumes. Dedicated to Viscountess Sidmouth.

== Death ==
Elizabeth Anne Le Noir died on 6 May 1841 at the age of 86 at the Priory, Caversham. She outlived her husband by six years; he having died at the age of 80.
