= A Song to David =

Poem

A Song to David, a 1763 poem by Christopher Smart, was, debatably, most likely written during his stay in a mental asylum while he wrote Jubilate Agno. Although it received mixed reviews, it was his most famous work until the discovery of Jubilate Agno.

The poem focuses on King David and various aspects of his life, but quickly turns to an emphasis on Christ and Christianity.

== Background ==
There is no evidence proving that Christopher Smart wrote A Song to David while locked away in a mental asylum for seven years. However, John Langhorne claimed, in the 1763 Monthly Review, "that it was written when the Author was denied the use of pen, ink, and paper, and was obliged to indent his lines, with the end of a key upon the wainscot." It is unlikely that Christopher had to go to such extremes to actually write the poem, but many scholars believe that it was written during his confinement. However, Christopher Hunter, Christopher Smart's nephew, claims:

"our Author wrote a Poem called a Song to David, and a new Version of the Psalms: he also translated the Works of Horace, and the Fables of Phaedrus into English Metre; and versified our Saviour's Parables. These, with two small pamphlets of Poems, were written after his confinement, and bear for the most part melancholy proofs of the recent estrangement of his mind."

One of Christopher Smart's biographers, Arthur Sherbo, claims that the A Song to David, the translation of the Psalms, and Hymns and Spiritual Songs were "largely composed between March, 1759, and August 26, 1760."

The first publication was advertised on 6 April 1763. Smart later republished the work in his 1765 A Translation of the Psalms of David, Attempted in the Spirit of Christianity, and Adapted to the Divine Service, which included a translation of the Psalms and Christopher Smart's Hymns and Spiritual Songs. Later, A Song to David was not included in a collection of Christopher Smart's works by either Christopher Hunter, his nephew, or Elizabeth LeNoir, his daughter. Neither of Christopher Smart's anthologies, Anderson and Chalmers, could find a complete edition of the work. The text was then lost until the 1819 and 1827 editions of the poem.

Four stanzas of the poem were set as the anthem "Praise Above All, for Praise Prevails" by the British composer Malcolm Archer specifically to celebrate the 300th anniversary of the founding of the Parish Church of St. Helena, Beaufort, South Carolina, in 2012.

Christopher's A Song to David is an attempt to bridge poetry written by humans and divinely inspired Biblical poetry. The Biblical David plays an important role in this poem just like he played an important role in Jubilate Agno However, David in Jubilate Agno is an image of the creative power of poetry whereas he becomes a fully realized model of the religious poet. By focusing on David, Christopher is able to tap into the "heavenly language."

However, the true life of the poem comes later when Christ is introduced as the major subject. After Christ is introduced, Christopher attempts to "reach to heaven" and the final passages, to Neil Curry, represent a "final rush for glory."

=== Freemasonry ===
Many critics have focused on the role of David as planner of Solomon's Temple and his possible role with the Freemasons. Rose claims in 2005 that it is not known for sure if Smart was a Freemason or not; there is no public record explicitly connecting Smart with Freemasonry there is conjecture that he was either a Freemason or had a strong knowledge of its symbols from an exposé of the time. Sherbo claimed in his 1967 biography of Smart (as well as in several articles on Smart) that based on personal admittance to writing A Defence of Freemasonry, contemporary verification of his participation in the volume and with Masonic meetings, confirms "his participation in Masonic affairs."

It was this important detail that encouraged many critics to try to decode the "seven pillar" section of A Song of David along the lines of Freemason imagery. The poem follows two traditional sets of motions common to Freemason writing that mimics the image of Jacob's Ladder: movement from earth to heaven and movement from heaven to earth. This image further connects Freemason belief surrounding the relationship of David to Solomon's Temple. While these images, and further images in A Song to David are related also to depictions of the Temple in Isaac Newton's Chronology of Ancient Kingdoms Amended (1728), John Bunyan's Solomon's Temple Spiritualiz'd (1688), and to the Geneva Bible, as "there was considerable interest...in King Solomon's Temple and its construction, not just in the realm of Freemasonry."

Based on this theory, the first pillar, the Greek alpha, represents the mason's compass and "God as the Architect of the Universe." The second, the Greek gamma, represents the mason's square. In addition, the square represents the "vault of heaven." The third, the Greek eta, represents Jacob's ladder itself and is connected to the complete idea of seven pillars. The fourth, the Greek theta, is either "the all-seeing eye or the point within a circle." The fifth letter, the Greek iota, represents a pillar and the temple. The sixth letter, the Greek sigma, is an incomplete hexagram, otherwise known as "the blazing star or hexalpha" to the Freemasons. The last, the Greek omega, represents a lyre and David as a poet.

While Solomon's Temple does figure prominently in Freemasonry, David himself is barely mentioned in Masonic ritual.

=== An Early Model ===
According to a prospective editor of Smart, Robert E. Brittain, an unsigned poem by the name of "The Benedicite Paraphrased" could very well be the work of Christopher Smart himself. Appearing for the first time in Robert Dodsley's periodical, The Museum, in 1746, which is 17 years before "A Song To David," it follows exactly the same rhyme scheme and structure as the aforementioned work. Brittain explains that "The Benedicite Paraphrased" has the same "throbbing rise and fall which distinguishes the 'Song To David.'" If the poem had come about nearer to the time frame in which Smart's Song and Psalms were published, there would be no question as to who it belonged to. However, the question remains of whether or not Smart would have created such a similar work that early in his career. If so, it's likely that the Song was created long before it was published.

== Critical response ==
Many contemporary critics of Christopher Smart attacked various aspects of A Song to David upon its publication. The Critical Review praised the poem with "great rapture and devotion is discernible in this extatic song. It is a fine piece of ruins, and must at once please and affect a sensible mind" but brought up the "[im]propriety of a Protestant's offering up either hymns or prayers to the dead" like a Catholic would. The Monthly Review felt that the poem was "irregularly great" although a few stanzas showed "a grandeur, a majesty of thought, not without a happiness of expression." Professional critics were not the only ones to demonstrate a less than accepting view of A Song to David; William Mason wrote to Thomas Gray, "I have seen his Song to David & from thence conclude him as mad as ever."

Not every response was negative, and Christopher received much support within the London poet community. William Kenrick, Christopher's former rival, praised the poem in a poem of his own printed on 25 May 1763. Also, John Lockman followed on 21 June 1763 with his own poem in praise of Christopher's, and Samuel Boyce followed this on 15 July 1763 with his. Regardless of what these poets felt, Christopher Smart's daughter, Elizabeth, claimed that "all a daughter's partiality could not lead the writer of this to admire it, nor all her pains, after many perusals, discover the beauties with which, when supposed lost, it was so liberally endowed." Later, when the text was recovered and reprinted in 1819, John Scott viewed the poem as proof that Christopher was both insane and a poet: the poem had the benefit of "originality" and "beautiful and well selected imagery" but there were "symptoms of the author's state of mind, in a frequent vagueness of meaning, in an abruptness of transition, and sometimes in the near neighbourhood of the most incongruous ideas."

Although it took a century later before a positive twist was put on Christopher Smart's time in a mental asylum, Robert Browning later remarked in his Parleyings (1887) that A Song to David was great because Smart was mad, and that the poem allowed Smart to rank alongside of Milton and Keats. Christopher Smart, as Browning's poem claims,

"pierced the screen
Twixt thing and word, lit language straight from soul, -
Left no fine film-flake on the naked coal
Live from the censer"

It was Browning's remarks that brought about a later "appreciation: of A Song to David. More specifically, on a review of Browning Parleying claimed that Christopher Smart was:

"possessed by his subject... and where there is true possession - where the fires of the poet's imagination are not choked by self-consciousness or by too much fuel from the intellect - idiosyncrasy, mannerism, and even conventional formulae are for the time 'burnt and purged away'."

In addition to this review, Dante Gabriel Rossetti claimed that A Song to David was "the only great accomplished poem of the last century." Two years later, Francis Palgrave wrote that the Song exhibited "noble wildness and transitions from grandeur to tenderness, from Earth to Heaven" and it was "unique in our Poetry." Seven years after Palgrave, John Churton Collins agreed with Rossetti and Palgrave, but not to the same degree, when he claims, "This poem stands alone, the most extraordinary phenomenon, perhaps, in our literature, the one rapt strain in the poetry of the eighteenth century, the work of a poet who, though he produced much, has not produced elsewhere a single line which indicates the power here displayed."

== See also ==
- Jubilate Agno
- Hymns and Spiritual Songs
