= Paper War of 1752–1753 =

Authors' dispute in London, England

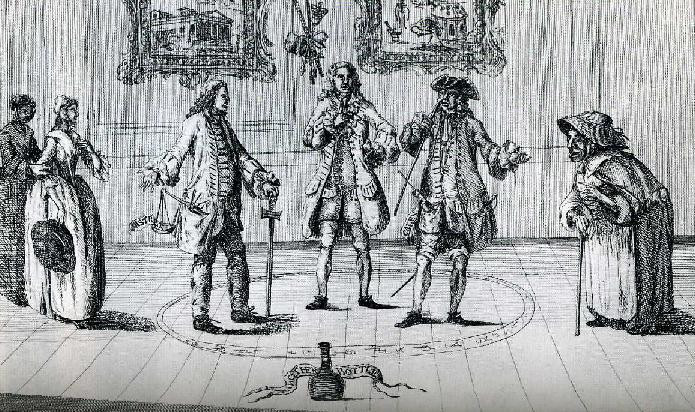
The Conjurers (1753) depicting Fielding (left of centre) and Hill (right of centre)

In 1752, Henry Fielding started a "paper war", a long-term dispute with constant publication of pamphlets attacking other writers, between the various authors on London's Grub Street. Although it began as a dispute between Fielding and John Hill, other authors, such as Christopher Smart, Bonnell Thornton, William Kenrick, Arthur Murphy and Tobias Smollett, were soon dedicating their works to aid various sides of the conflict.

The dispute lasted until 1753 and involved many of London's periodicals. It eventually resulted in countless essays, poems, and even a series of mock epic poems starting with Smart's The Hilliad. Although it is unknown what actually started the dispute, it resulted in a divide of authors who either supported Fielding or supported Hill, and few in between.

== Background ==
Fielding started a "paper war" in the first issue of The Covent-Garden Journal (4 January 1752) by declaring war against "hack writers". John Hill claimed in the London Daily Advertiser (9 January 1752) Fielding had met with him prior to January and proposed what would be a fake paper war that would involve London writers "giving Blows that would not hurt, and sharing the Advantage in Silence." Such a meeting between Fielding and Hill to discuss the proposed war is believed to have occurred (if it occurred) on 28 December 1751. It is known that Hill met Fielding for legal business between 26 and 28 December 1751 after Hill was robbed.

Before Hill had revealed this information, he attacked Fielding's Amelia in the London Daily Advertiser on 8 January 1752. The book's title character, Amelia, was involved in an accident that damaged her face, and Hill, mocking the way Fielding described the scene, claimed that she "could charm the World without the Help of a Nose." In response to both the revelation and personal attacks, Fielding wrote on 11 January 1752: "If the Betrayer of a private Treaty could ever deserve the least Credit, yet his Lowness here must proclaim himself either a Liar, or a Fool. None can doubt that he is the former, if he hath feigned this Treaty, and I think few would scruple to call him the latter, if he had rejected it." Regardless of the merits of Hill's claim, a war was soon started: by the third issue of The Covent-Garden Journal, Fielding narrowed his satire upon John Hill.

Although Hill, Fielding, Smart, Thornton, Kenrick, Murphy, and Smollett were all involved in the dispute, not all of them used their names; instead, many preferred to use pseudonyms along with attacks under their own name: Fielding wrote as "Sir Alexander Drawcansir"; Hill wrote as "The Inspector"; Thornton wrote as "Madam Roxanna"; and Smart wrote as "Mrs. Mary Midnight". It was under these pseudonyms that various authors soon responded to Fielding's attacks and to Fielding's plan for a "Universal Register Office", a planned center of advertisement of jobs, goods for sale, and other items. If this was not enough, Fielding started a dispute, just a few months before, with Philip D'Halluin, a former employee who established the competing "Public Register Office" in King Street, Covent Garden, who hired Bonnell Thornton, a friend of Smart, to attack Fielding and Hill. Hill had aided Fielding in this matter.

Later, Hill attacked both Fielding and Smart, 13 August 1752, in the only issue of The Impertinent to be produced. Although the work was published anonymously, it was commonly known that it was produced by Hill, and he soon followed up the pamphlet with his 25 August 1752 The Inspector column in the London Daily Advertiser. With the column, he harshly criticized Smart's Poems on Several Occasions. Fielding eventually left the dispute after the sixth issue of The Covent-Garden Journal was published.

== Event ==
Although it is quite possible that the first work in the "war" was produced by Smart on 29 April 1751, it is also possible that the origins of the dispute could be traced even further back to Hill's publications between February and March 1751. Fielding's first paper in the "war" was also the first issue of The Covent-Garden Journal on 4 January 1752. In it, Fielding attacked all of the writers of Grub Street, which brought a quick response. Hill responded twice and claimed that Fielding was planning a fake dispute on 9 January 1752, Smollett attacked Hill's piece on 15 January 1752, and Thornton soon responded against Fielding in Have At You All: or, The Drury Lane Journal on 16 January 1752.

During this time, personal works, such as Fielding's Amelia, became targets. On 11 January 1752, Fielding responded to Hill and those who supported his view of Amelia in The Covent-Garden Journal by stating:

a famous Surgeon, who absolutely cured one Mrs Amelia Booth, of a violent Hurt in her Nose, insomuch, that she had scarce a Scar left on it, intends to bring Actions against several ill-meaning and slanderous People, who have reported that the said Lady had no Nose, merely because the Author of her History, in a Hurry, forgot to inform his Readers of that Particular.

Hill was not the only one to attack the work; Thornton wrote satires of Amelia in the Drury-Lane Journal. Thornton's satires were first published on 16 January 1752 and included a fake advertisement for a parody novel called "Shamelia", playing off of title of Fielding's parody Shamela. He later parodied Amelia again on 13 February 1752 in a piece called "A New Chapter in Amelia." Tobias Smollett joined in and published the pamphlet Habbakkuk Hilding anonymously on 15 January 1752. Although there were many attacks against Fielding's novel, there was some support for the work, and an anonymous pamphlet was written to attack "Hill and 'the Town'" while praising Amelia. On 25 January 1752, Fielding defended his work again by bringing the novel before the imaginary "Court of Censorial Enquiry", in which Hill and the other critics are the prosecutors and it is they, not Amelia, that are truly put on trial.

The Covent-Garden Journal served Fielding well and he used it in his attacks upon Hill and Hill's supporters in the Journal piece called "Journal of the present Paper War between the Forces under Sir Alexander Drawcansir, and the Army of Grub-street". The work was modelled after Jonathan Swift's The Battle of the Books and Fielding pretended to be a military leader that would lead "English VETERANS" against those who were compared to characters from the Greek and Roman classics along with those from modern French literature. However, he changed roles on the fourth issue, produced on 14 January 1752, and transformed himself into a "judge". By February, Kenrick joined in and "dramatized" the "Paper War" in a production called Fun and proceeded to defend Fielding. Charles Macklin followed suit by holding a benefit on 8 April 1752 at the Covent Garden with a two-act play called The Covent Garden Theater, or Pasquin Turn'd Drawcansir; the play portrayed Fielding attacking the Hill and his followers, the "Town".

A pamphlet in the London Daily Advertiser published on 29 January 1752 called The March of the Lion links various authors involved in the war and is the first to introduce Smart via a reference to his "Mrs. Mary Midnight" pseudonym, although Smart was not yet a participant. However, Smart did begin directly participating in the matter 4 August 1752 with the publication in The Midwife of a parody on Hill's "Inspector" persona. In the piece, Smart responded to Hill's attack on Smart's "Old Woman's Oratory" show and Hill's claim that the show was dead. Hill was quick to respond; he attacked both Fielding and Smart in a piece published on 13 August 1752 in the only issue of The Impertinent. In the work, Hill claimed that authors either write because "they have wit" or "they are hungry". He further claimed that Smart,

wears a ridiculous comicalness of aspect, that makes people smile when they see him at a distance: His mouth opens, because he must be fed; and the world often joins with the philosopher in laughing at the insensibility and obstinancy that make him prick his lips with thistles." The work was published anonymously. Some tried to claim that Samuel Johnson was the author and Hill tried to hide his authorship by attacking the essay in the 25 August 1752 "The Inspector" (No. 464). However, he was soon exposed and it became commonly known that Hill produced both and he soon followed up the pamphlet in the London Daily Advertiser.

With his 25 August 1752 The Inspector column, Hill harshly criticised Smart's Poems on Several Occasions. Although Hill claimed to praise Smart, he did so in a manner, as Betty Rizzo claims, "that managed to insult and degrade Smart with patronizing encouragement." Arthur Murphy responded to this essay, and to Hill, in the 21 October 1752 edition of the Gray's Inn Journal. Following Murphy, Thornton attacked both Hill and Fielding in The Spring-Garden Journal on 16 November 1752. The Gentleman's Journal issue of November 1752 came out with a quick retort and claimed that those who supported Hill "espoused the cause of Gentleman" and those who sided with Fielding espoused the cause "of the comedian." This essay accomplished little but to polarise both sides even more. Hill then responded to Murphy, and their dispute was printed in a supplement of the December issue of the Gentleman's Journal.

On 1 February 1753, Smart published The Hilliad, an attack upon Hill that one critic, Lance Bertelsen, describes as the "loudest broadside" of the war. The response to The Hilliad was swift: Samuel Derrick responded directly with his The Smartiad, Arthur Murphy criticized Smart for his personally attacking Hill, and Rules for Being a Wit tried to provoke further response from Smart. However, Smart stopped responding to either of these assaults. Soon after, Hill ended his attacks with the final shot in December 1752.
