= The Hop-Garden =

Poem by Christopher Smart

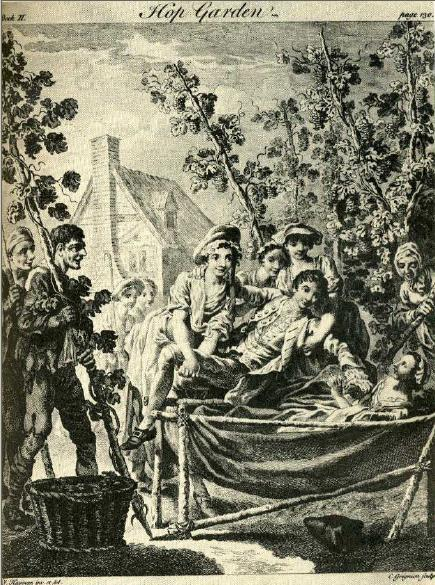
Illustration of The Hop-Garden

The Hop-Garden by Christopher Smart was first published in Poems on Several Occasions, 1752. The poem is rooted the Virgilian georgic and Augustan literature; it is one of the first long poems published by Smart. The poem is literally about a hop garden, and, in the Virgilian tradition, attempts to instruct the audience in how to farm hops properly.

While the poem deals with natural and scientific principles, there is a strong autobiographical tendency. While the poem marks Smart's classical and Latin influences, it also reveals Smart's close association and influence with Miltonic poetic form, especially with the reliance on Miltonic blank verse.

== Background ==
In 1726, Peter Smart, Christopher Smart's father, purchased Hall-Place in East Barming, which included a mansion house, fields, orchards, gardens, and woodland; this property was influential throughout Smart’s later life. From the age of four until eleven, he spent much time around the farms, but varying reports of his level of participation during the day-to-day activities lead some to speculations that he sat out during most of the work and possibly suffered from asthma attacks. However, not all scholars agree that he was a "sickly youth." Instead, there is substantial evidence to suggest that Smart spent his time enjoying the country side and immersing himself in the nature around East Barming.

The Medway river that runs through the area was of particular interest to Smart as a young boy, and it is remembered in The Hop-Garden along with mention few of Smart's other poems. The first edition of The Hop-Garden, in Poems on Several Occasions, 1752, included plates from Smart's friends Francis Hayman and Thomas Worlidge. The original edition of Poems on Several Occasions, 1752, had 751 subscribers and sold 851 of 1,000 printed copies, even though it sold for ten shillings each.

The Hop-Garden is split into two books totaling 733 lines (429 lines and 304 lines respectively) and written in Miltonic blank verse. It may have been expected that Smart would rely on Augustan rhyming couplets for his poem, even though Pope stated that Miltonic language might be inappropriate for a pastoral theme. However, Smart does not hide this fact; instead, he emphasizes it when he says:

Under what sign to pluck the crop, and how
To cure, and in capacious sacks infold,
I teach in verse Miltonian

(The Hop-Garden Book the First, 4-6).

With these words Smart also introduces the georgic basis of the poem and that he would "teach" how to farm hops in order to use them to flavor alcoholic drinks. However, Smart does more than "teach in verse Miltonian" as he relies on various forms and styles to "express a variety of viewpoints."

While the poem discusses farming methods, it also expresses a "'Patriot' hostility" to Walpole and the later Carteret/Compton administration of the British Parliament. The poem, in essence, is anti-Hanoverian, although he would later change this view.

=== Autobiography ===
The Hop-Garden is a personal work and contains many biographical references.

One of such as his mention of his deceased friend, Theophilus Wheeler, who died at Christ's College, Cambridge, a year after starting. In particular, Smart was working on the poem when Theophilus died, and he dedicated a portion of the second book to his memory:

THEOPHILUS, thou dear departed soul,
What flattering tales thou told'st me? How thou'dst hail
My Muse, and took'st imaginary walks
All in my hopland groves! Stay yet, oh stay!
Thou dear deluder, thou hast seen but half-
He's gone! and ought that's equal to his praise
Fame has not for me, tho' she prove most kind.
Howe'er this verse be sacred to thy name,
These tears, the last sad duty of a friend.
Oft I'll indulge the pleasurable pain
Of recollection; oft on Medway's banks
I'll muse on thee full pensive; while her streams
Regardful ever of my grief, shall flow
In sullen silence silverly along
The weeping shores - or else accordant with
My loud laments, shall ever and anon
Make melancholy music to the shades,
The hopland shades, that on her bank expose
Serpentine vines and flowing locks of gold.

(The Hop-Garden Book the Second, 25-43)

Part of the motivation to dedicating such a large portion of the poem to a discussion about Wheeler comes from his relationship with the writing of the poem; Smart showed an early version of the first book to Wheeler in 1743 before Wheeler's death.

=== Satire ===
In Chris Mounsey's biography of Christopher Smart, the fourth chapter is devoted to an examination of The Hop-Garden. However, this examination admittedly does not focus on the poem as a georgic, but emphasizes an Augustan nature of the poem, especially its potential as a satirical attack upon John Philips's Cyder (1708). By mocking the use of poetry for praise in the poem's epigram, Smart sets the stage for his work to satirize a previous work that indulged too much in a desire for praise, and, as Mounsey points out, Philip's Cyder was an earlier poem that shared alcoholic agriculture-subject of The Hop-Garden. The main point of criticism by Smart against Philip would be Philip's use of "Roman" farming methods instead of "up-to-date scientific methods".

However, Juan Pellicer reviewed Mounsey's theory of The Hop-Garden as a satire and believed that Mounsey's chapter underestimated Philip's background. Furthermore, as Pellicer claims, there would be no need for a dispute to be made over farming methods, and Smart is instead writing a poem that complements Philip's instead of satirizes it. Philips, like Smart, had an intimate background with farming methods for their respective industries, and they both relied on scientific techniques that were shown to work in their respective communities. To view the poem as a satire would be incorrect, because "One should hesitate to consider agricultural methodology 'the nub' of Smart’s poem."

== Critical reception ==
Samuel Johnson, friend of Smart, joked about the poem as proof that "one could say a great deal about cabbage." However, not everyone was as playful, and one of Smart's later literary opponents, John Hill, was one of the first to review The Hop-Garden; Hill used his piece in the Monthly Review to attack the poem. It was this review, even after Smart's reply in The Hilliad, that guided the future negative reception of the poem that Chris Mounsey describes as a "litany of abuse".

Among Smart's biographers, the quality of the work is very debatable: Arthur Sherbo claims that the work "is remarkable for the poorness of the blank verse and the stilted Latinate quality of its language" while Chris Mounsey responds, "Possibly because of its complexity, allied to the fact that it does not meet with the expectations of most readers of Smart, the poem has hitherto been ill interpreted." However, they both agree that the work provides valuable insight into Smart's earlier years and portrays nature and farming in a realistic manner.

== See also ==
- Bucolics
- John Philips
