= Hymns and Spiritual Songs (book) =

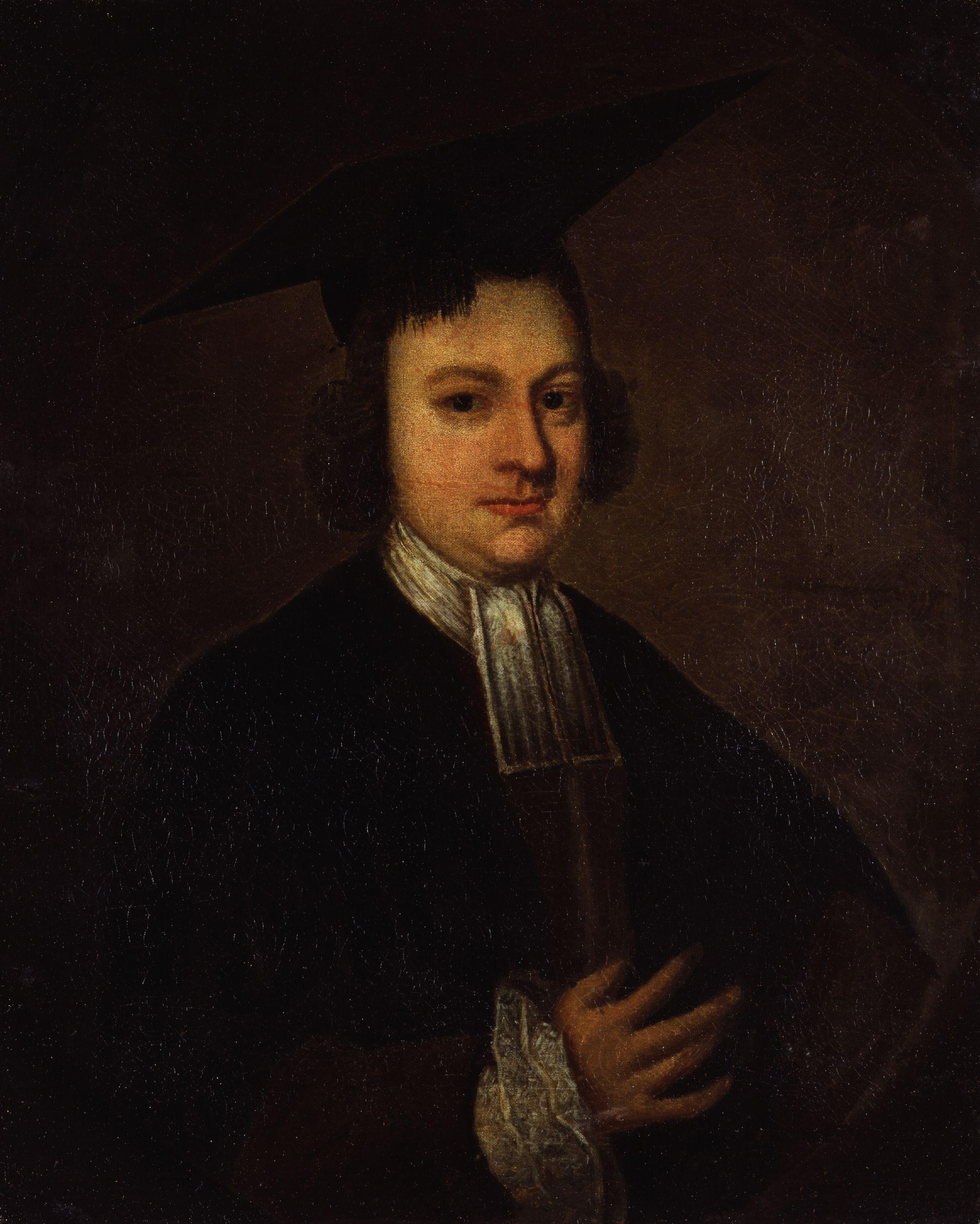
Christopher Smart, the author.

Hymns and Spiritual Songs for the Fasts and Festivals of the Church of England, by Christopher Smart, was published in 1765, along with a translation of the Psalms of David and a new version of A Song to David. He wrote these poems while he was in a mental asylum and during the time he wrote Jubilate Agno.

== Background ==
For many years after the Protestant Reformation, John Calvin's claim that non-Biblical music was inappropriate was popularly held. Isaac Watts wrote and published a collection of hymns and spiritual songs in the early 18th century. But, Jonathan Swift and Samuel Johnson parodied Calvin's beliefs, claiming that religion and poetry could not mix because the poetry could be damaged: Swift claimed that "the smallest quantity of religion, like a single drop of Malt-Liquor in Claret, will muddy and discompose the brightest Poetical Genius." Johnson wrote that Watt's

"devotional poetry is, like that of others, unsatisfactory. The paucity of its topicks enforces perpetual repetition, and the sanctity of the matter rejects the ornaments of figurative diction. It is sufficient for Watts to have done better than others what no man has done well."

Isaac Watts' hymns became popular in public worship.

Christopher Smart also wrote hymns, as "a private act of worship." His Hymns were printed in A Translation of the Psalms of David, Attempted in the Spirit of Christianity, and Adapted to the Divine Service, a volume published in 1765. It contained a translation of the Psalms, a new series of Hymns, and a copy of A Song to David. Although the work was not published until 1765, Smart was advertising a work containing both Psalms and Hymns in 1763. The Hymns contained thirty-five hymns. They were not reprinted until Christopher Smart's daughter, Elizabeth LeNoir, published Miscellaneous Poems, which contained changed versions of hymn 3, 7, 10, 11, 13, 15, 28, and 32. Although Smart published only one edition of the work, many famous names appeared on the subscription list. The work was published by Dryden Leach, but received little notice in various reviews and no mention of the Hymns.

== Hymns and Spiritual Songs ==
The Hymns were composed between June 1762 and January 1763 while Smart was in a mental asylum for "religious mania." His "D Fragment" of Jubilate Agno says:

The Lord magnify the idea of Smarts singing hymns on this day in the eyes of the whole University of Cambridge. (D148)
Novr 5th 1762. N.S.

This fragment led Robert Brittain, one of Christopher Smart's editors, to claim that "Smart had just written his 'Hymn xxix. The Fifth of November'." This would verify that Christopher Smart wrote these Hymns while in a mental asylum and that he was creating hymns to follow the Church Year. While the references to hymns in the "D Fragment" of Jubilate Agno does not provide a definite date of creation for the hymns, it narrows their origins to a few years.

The Hymns are modeled after a tradition of hymn writing exemplified by Robert Nelson. Both rely on common Anglican texts. Smart relied most on the Bible and the Book of Common Prayer as the basis of his hymns. They form a sort of "companion" to the Book of Common Prayer. The complexity of the Biblical allusions and Biblical works may confuse or mislead a reader who is not steeped in Biblical tradition.

The Hymns generally follow the festivals and fasts that were important to Anglican tradition but they also include four "Solemn Days": the "Martyrdom of the Blessed King Charles the First" on 30 January, the "King's Restoration" on 29 May, the "Accession of the Ruling Monarch" on 25 October and the "Most Traiterous and bloody intended Massacre by Gunpowder" on 5 November. Marking these days symbolised Smart's patriotism and his hostility to the Roman Catholic Church.

=== Hymns ===
Thirty-five hymns are included in Hymns and Spiritual Songs (listed below in groups of five):

- I. New Year II. Circumcision III. Epiphany IV. Conversion of Saint Paul V. King Charles the Martyr
- VI. The Presentation of Christ in the Temple VII. Ash Wednesday. First Day of Lent VIII. St. Matthias IX. The Annunciation of the Blessed Virgin X. The Crucifixion of Our Blessed Lord
- XI. Easter Day XII. St. Mark XIII. St. Philip and St. James XIV. The Ascension of Our Lord Jesus Christ XV. Whitsunday
- XVI. Trinity Sunday XVII. The King's Restoration XVIII. St. Barnabas XIX. The Nativity of St. John the Baptist XX. St. Peter
- XXI. St. James XXII. St. Bartholomew XXIII. St. Matthew XXIV. St. Michael and All Angels XXV. St. Luke
- XXVI. The Accession of King George III XXVII. St. Simon and St. Jude XXVIII. All Saints XXIX. The Fifth of November XXX. St. Andrew
- XXXI. St. Thomas XXXII. The Nativity of Our Lord and Saviour Jesus Christ XXXIII. St. Stephen XXXIV. St. John the Evangelist XXXV. The Holy Innocents
