= Christopher Smart =

English poet (1722–1771)

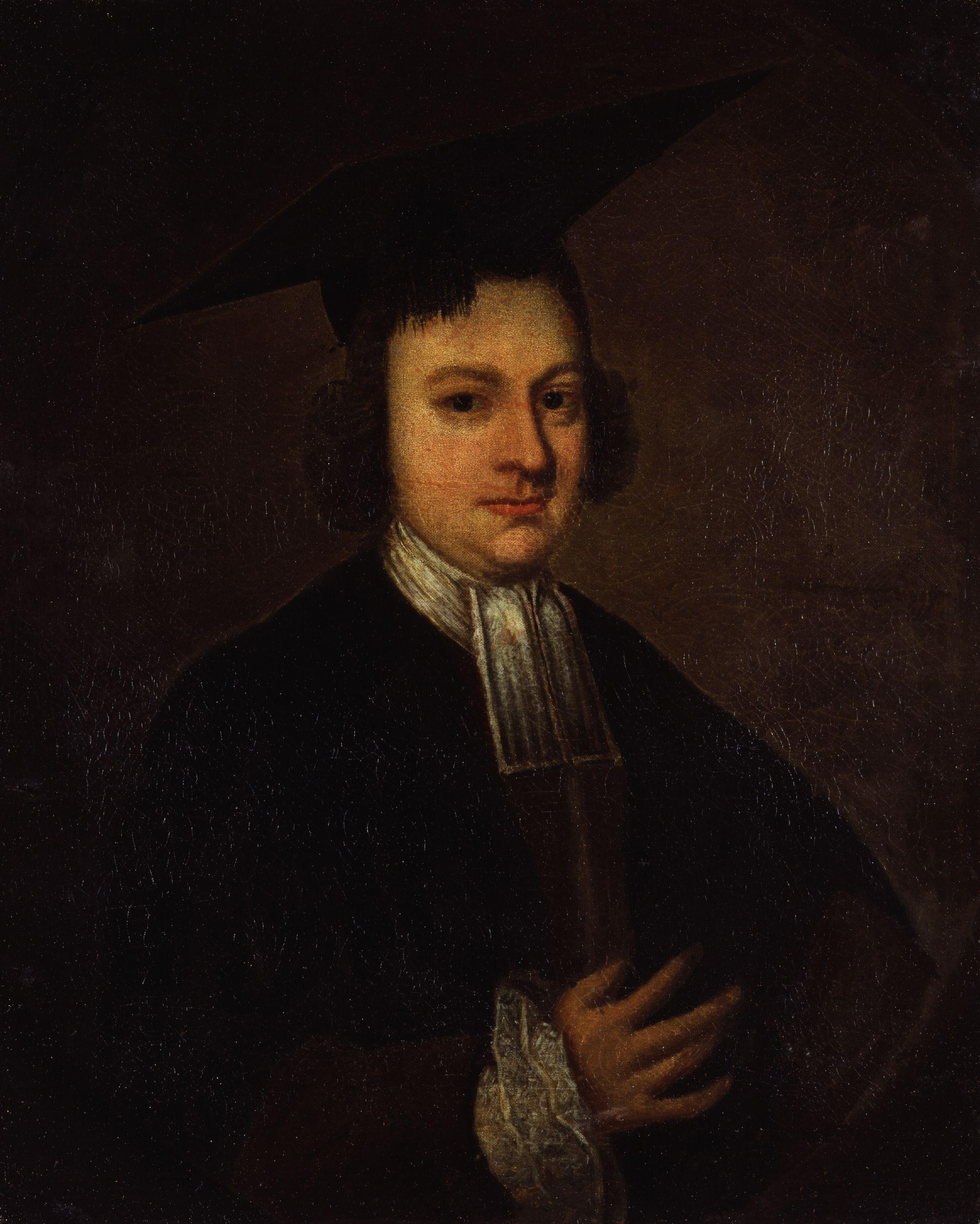
- Portrait, c. 1745
- Born: 11 April 1722; Shipbourne, England
- Died: 20 May 1771 (aged 49); King's Bench Prison, London, England
- Occupations: Actor, editor, playwright, poet, translator
- Spouse: Anna-Maria Carnan (m. 1752)
- Children: 3; including Elizabeth
- Writing career
- Pen name: Mrs Mary Midnight, Ebenezer Pentweazle
- Movement: The Augustans

Christopher Smart (11 April 1722 – 20 May 1771) was an English poet. He was a major contributor to two popular magazines, The Midwife and The Student, and a friend to influential cultural icons like Samuel Johnson and Henry Fielding. Smart, a high church Anglican, was widely known throughout London.

Smart was infamous as the pseudonymous midwife "Mrs. Mary Midnight" and for widespread accounts of his years confined in a mental asylum by his father-in-law, John Newbery, due to Smart's supposed religious "mania". Even after Smart's eventual release, a negative reputation continued to pursue him as he was known for incurring more debt than he could repay; this ultimately led to his confinement in debtors' prison until his death.

His two most widely known works are A Song to David and Jubilate Agno, which are sometimes believed to have been written during his confinement in St. Luke's Asylum, although there is no record of their dates. Jubilate Agno was not published until 1939 when it was found in a library archive, and A Song to David received mixed reviews until the 19th century. To his contemporaries, Smart was known mainly for his many contributions in the journals The Midwife and The Student, along with his famous Seaton Prize poems and his mock epic The Hilliad. Although he is recognized primarily as a religious poet, his poetry includes various other themes, such as his theories on nature and his promotion of English nationalism.

== Biography ==
=== Early life ===
Christopher Smart was born in Shipbourne in Kent, England on the Fairlawne estate of William, Viscount Vane, younger son of Lord Barnard of Barnard Castle. He was, according to his nephew, "of a delicate constitution having been born earlier than the natural period". He was baptized in Wrotham parish on 11 May 1722. His father was Peter Smart, steward or bailiff of Fairlawne. His mother, Winifred (née Griffiths) was from Radnorshire, Wales. Before giving birth to Christopher, Winifred had two daughters, Margaret and Mary Anne.

During his younger years, Fairlawne was the residence of Christopher Vane, 1st Baron Barnard and Lady Barnard, who bequeathed £200 to Smart. He supposedly received this sum due to his father's closeness to the Vane family, Smart being named after Christopher Vane, and the young boy being considered "the pride of Fairlawn". In 1726, three years after Christopher Vane died, Peter Smart purchased Hall-Place in East Barming, which included a mansion house, fields, orchards, gardens, and woodland, a property that was influential throughout Smart's later life. From the age of four until eleven, he spent much time around the farms, but did not participate, leading to speculation that he had had asthma attacks. However, not all scholars agree that he was a "sickly youth". The only written record of events during his childhood comes from his writing of a short poem, at the age of four, in which he challenges a rival to the affections of a twelve-year-old girl.

While at Hall-Place, Smart was sent to the local Maidstone Grammar School where he was taught by Charles Walwyn, a scholar from Eton College who had received an MA from King's College, Cambridge in 1696. It was here that Smart received an intensive education in Latin and Greek. He did not complete his education at Maidstone however, as his father died on 3 February 1733, and his mother took Smart and his siblings to live near relatives in Durham after selling off a large portion of the estate to pay off Peter Smart's debts.

Smart then attended Durham School, where the Reverend Mr. Richard Dongworth was headmaster; it is not known whether he lived with his uncle, John Smart, or with a school master. He spent vacations at Raby Castle, which was owned by Henry Vane, 1st Earl of Darlington, the grandson of Christopher Vane. Henry Vane and his wife Grace, sister to William and Henrietta FitzRoy the Duke and Duchess of Cleveland, had four children, Henry, Frederick, Anne, and Mary. They were only a few years younger than Smart and became playmates, with Anne and Henry "pairing off" with Christopher and his sister Margaret respectively. Although nothing resulted from the match, Anne has been traditionally described as being his "first love". During his time with the Vane family, Smart dedicated many poems to Henrietta, the Duchess of Cleveland. It was his closeness with the Vane family along with his skill for learning that encouraged Henrietta to allow him a pension of 40 pounds yearly, continued by her husband after her death in 1742. This allowed Smart to attend Pembroke College, Cambridge.

=== College ===
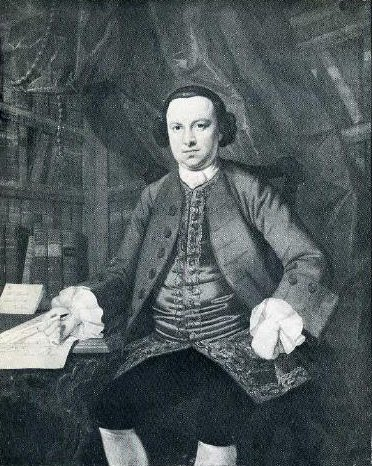
Christopher Smart's Pembroke portrait showing a letter sent from Alexander Pope

Smart was admitted to Pembroke College on 20 October 1739 as a sizar under Leonard Addison. Although it is unclear why he chose Pembroke College, Addison was named in Peter Smart's trust deed (1729). As a sizar, he occasionally had to wait on the "Fellows' table" and perform other menial tasks. On 12 July 1740, he was awarded the "Dr. Watt's Foundation scholarship", which granted him six pounds a year until he gained a Bachelor of Arts degree. In addition to this income, he was also granted four pounds a year for scholarship. Although he was successful academically, he began to run up debt in order to pay for his extravagant lifestyle while at the college.

During his time at Pembroke, Smart borrowed numerous books spanning the fields of literature, religion, and science. These works helped when he wrote the three "Tripos Verse" at the end of each year. These poems were written in Latin and they, along with his other Latin poems like his translation of Alexander Pope's Ode on St. Cecilia's Day, led to him being awarded the Craven scholarship for classics on 10 June 1742, which paid £25 a year for 14 years. These scholarships, combined with his becoming a fellow in 1743, justified Smart calling himself "Scholar of the University".

In 1743, Smart published his translation of Pope's Ode on St. Cecilia's Day as Carmen Cl. Alexandri Pope in S. Caeciliam Latine Redditum and paid for the publication himself. With this translation, he wanted to win Pope's favor and translate Pope's Essay on Man, but Pope rejected the idea and, after a lettered response and a possible meeting between the two, Smart translated Pope's An Essay on Criticism (De Arte Critica) instead. The initial letter sent from Pope recommending the future translation was prized by Smart. In response to this letter and his budding relationship with Pope, the Pembroke Fellows honoured him with a portrait showing him holding the letter from Pope and allowed him to write a poem in celebration of Jubilee of Pembroke's 400th year in 1744.

In October 1745, Smart was elected Praelector of Philosophy, which paid one pound a year, and made one of three Keepers of the Common Chest. The next year, on 11 February 1746, he became a Master of Arts and was later elected on 10 October 1746, to Praelector of Philosophy, Praelector of Rhetoric, and Keeper of the Common Chest. However, he had run up more debt of over twice his annual income, and he was not re-elected in 1747 to the Praelectorship and was denied his control over the Common Chest accounts. However, he was made a "Preacher before the Mayor of Cambridge" at the college under the title "Concionatori Coram Praetore oppidano", and his modest living during this year allowed him to regain Praelectorship in Philosophy along with being made a catechist, which suggests that he was ordained in the Anglican church.

In 1746, Smart became tutor to John Hussey Delaval, but this was abruptly cancelled because Delaval was removed from Pembroke after a variation of broken rules and mischief. After recovering from this, Smart returned to studying. In April 1747, a comedy he wrote just months before, A Trip to Cambridge, or The Grateful Fair, was performed in Pembroke College Hall, with many parts, including female roles, played by Smart himself. The prologue was printed in The Cambridge Journal Weekly Flying-Post, which claimed that the play received "Universal Applause".

During his final years at Pembroke, Smart was writing and publishing many poems. On 9 January 1748, there were three proposals for "A Collection of Original Poems, By Christopher Smart, M.A., Fellow of Pembroke Hall, in the University of Cambridge" that would include "The Hop Garden", "The Judgment of Midas, a Masque", his odes, his translations into Latin, and some original Latin poems. Thomas Gray, on 17 March 1747, referred to this work as Smart's "Collection of Odes". This collection was not printed in 1748 but was delayed until 1752, and was re-titled Poems on Several Occasions.

Between 1740 and 1746, he was introduced to Harriot Pratt, and he began to write poetry about her. By 1749, he was in love with her and wrote to his friend Charles Burney (father of Fanny Burney), "I am situated within a mile of my Harriote & Love has robd Friendship of her just dues ... There was a great musical crash at Cambridge, which was greatly admired, but I was not there, being much better pleased with hearing my Harriote on her spinnet & organ at her ancient mansion", suggesting that he was living permanently in Market Downham, London. Although he wrote many poems dedicated to Harriot, his poem "The Lass with the Golden Locks" (1752) claims that he was done with both Harriot, Polly, and other women. The "lass with the golden locks" who replaced Smart's previous fancies was Anna Maria Carnan. Anna would be Smart's future wife and she was the stepdaughter of John Newbery, Smart's future publisher.

=== Influence ===
While Smart was prolific in his own right, he was influenced by many of his contemporaries, as well as those that came before him. His primary influences being Alexander Pope, Virgil and Horace. Pope's influence can especially be seen in Smart's poem The Hilliad, a play on Pope's poem The Dunciad.

Smart also left his mark on writers after him. In his book Poor Kit Smart, Christopher Devlin writes of Smart's influence "Robert Browning, however, D. G. Rossetti and Sir Francis Palgrave proclaimed aloud that this madman's Song to David was along the masterpieces of the English language."

=== London ===
Although Smart seemed to turn his life around at Pembroke, he slowly abandoned the college for London. During 1749, he listed himself on Pembroke's "Liber Absentiae" and would occasionally return to Pembroke throughout 1749 and 1750. Because of his relationship with those at Pembroke, he was allowed to keep his name in the college's records, which allowed him to participate and be charged as a member of the college. By 1750 he was living near St. James's Park and was busy familiarising himself with Grub Street. It was this year that Smart developed a business relationship with John Newbery. He worked for Newbery and married his stepdaughter in 1752. It is unknown how Smart and Newbery met, but Smart's daughter claimed Charles Burney introduced the two. Newbery was looking for a contributory to his The Midwife and The Student magazines, and it is possible that Smart's winning of Cambridge's Seatonian Prize on 25 March 1750 brought his poetic abilities to Newbery's attention.

The Seatonian Prize was a contest for one English poem each year on the topic of "the Perfections or Attributes of the Supreme Being" and the prize would be the "Rent of the [Kislingbury, Northamptonshire] estate" It was established by the will of Thomas Seaton, an "Anglican divine and hymn writer". Smart wrote in the "poetical essay" tradition using Miltonic blank verse. In 1750, the poem he won the prize with was On the Eternity of the Supreme Being. The prize was only worth 17 pounds each year before 7 pounds were deducted for the publication of the poem. However, after the publication of the poem, Smart became a regular contributor in The Student.

The Student, before Smart's work, was a serious magazine that included a few poems and critical essays. However, once he joined and began writing under many pseudonyms, the magazine became filled with satire, parody, and humorous essays and poems. Along with him composing 15 of the essays and the majority of the poems published in the two volumes of the magazine, he decided to append three of The Inspector, a "humorous news report", to the second of the volumes. These reports included many "puff pieces" promoting Smart's works along with various stories written by his friends and associates, including the famous writers/poets Henry Fielding, Samuel Johnson, William Collins, and Tobias Smollett. However, this was not the only important publication produced by him during this time.

During his time in London, Smart's work included Mother Midnight's Oratory, a series of "wild tavern entertainments" to which Smart acted as writer and performer.

=== The Midwife ===
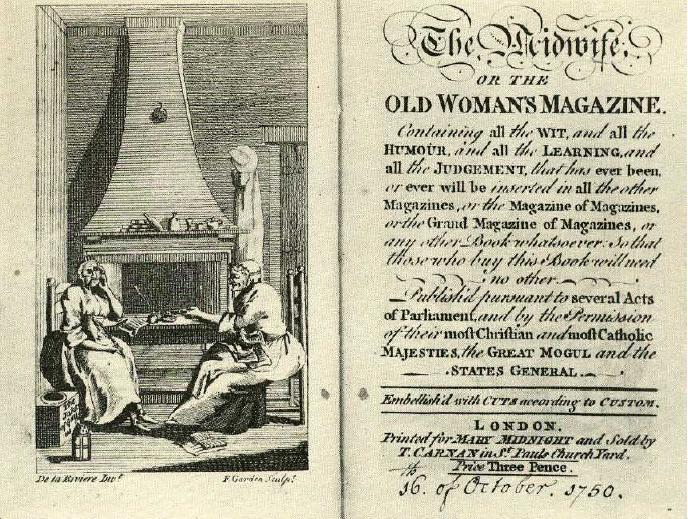
Title page of The Midwife

The Midwife, first published on 16 October 1751 and lasting until April 1753, was produced primarily by Smart while he worked on The Student. This magazine was popular enough to be published in four editions. To hide his identity for practical and humorous reasons, he adopted the persona of a midwife, also known as a "Mrs. Midwife" in slang, and called this persona "Mrs. Mary Midnight".

When his poem "Night Piece" was attacked by William Kenrick in Kapelion, or Poetical Ordinary, possibly out of a prearranged publicity stunt, Smart used The Midwife in December 1750, to attack back at Kenrick and promised an Old Woman's Dunciad to be written against the other poet. However, Kenrick beat Smart to the use of the title and printed his own in January 1751. This feud lasted as attacks published in a few issues of The Midwife, but it soon died out when Smart focused his attention to writing a prologue and epilogue for a production of Othello and using the magazine to promote it.

His attention slowly shifted away from The Midwife when he wrote for, and won, the "Seatonian Prize" for his On the Immensity of the Supreme Being and when he began working with Newbery's children's magazine, The Lilliputian Magazine. However, Smart returned to this character full force when he established The Old Woman's Oratory; or Henley in Petticoats in December 1751. The Oratory included Smart playing as Mrs. Midnight, various songs and dances, animal acts, and "miscellany" acts. The Oratory was successful, and was completely redone on 21 January 1752. However, not everyone enjoyed the show, and Horace Walpole described the performance as "the lowest buffoonery in the world even to me who am used to my uncle Horace." Late in 1752, Smart finished and published a collection of his works as Poems on Several Occasions, which resulted in the end of the Oratory and The Midwife.

=== Later career ===
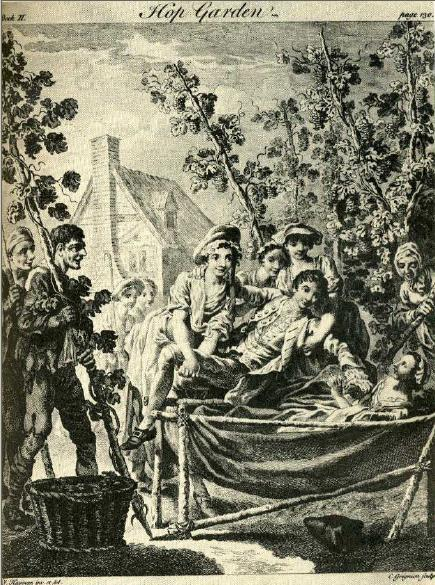
Illustration of The Hop-Garden

In 1752, Christopher Smart was slowly dragged into a large "paper war" that involved many of London's writers. After the publication of Poems on Several Occasions, including The Hop-Garden, in June 1752, John Hill launched a major attack upon Smart's poetry. Smart responded with his mock-epic The Hilliad. Before the release of Smart's poem, Hill was engaged in a large literary battle between various members of Grub Street's and London's writing community, especially Henry Fielding. This battle may have been for publicity only and lasted over many months before Smart involved himself. However, even with such a late entry, his Hilliad was the "loudest broadside" of the war.

Smart was incurring numerous debts, and started publishing as much as possible during this time to support his family. He is said to have married Anna-Maria Carnan around 1752 or 1753, although the exact date is unknown; they initially kept their marriage a secret so Smart could continue to get money from his Cambridge fellowship, which ended shortly thereafter. By 1754, the pair already had two daughters, Marianne (born 3 May 1753) and Elizabeth Anne (27 October 1754). As a married man, he could no longer remain enrolled at Pembroke and collect his scholarship money when his marriage and children were made apparent to the heads of the college. Newbery allowed Smart, along with his wife and their children, to live at Canonbury House, Islington. Although Newbery had a strong reputation for charity, he was determined to have complete control over his writers. It is likely that such an attitude combined with monetary problems led to a rift forming between the two by 1753.

Between 1753 and 1755, Smart published or republished at least 79 works. However, even if he received money from each of these publications, they were unable to provide enough of an income to support a family, especially to his standard of living. While he was producing a poem each year for the Seatonian Prize, this amounted to very little of his writing; he was forced into a life of "hack work", which was described by his contemporary, Arthur Murphy, as "a bookseller is his only friend, but for that bookseller, however liberal, he must toil and drudge." In December 1755, he finished The Works of Horace, Translated Literally into English Prose, a translation of Horace, which was widely used but brought him little profit.

He signed a 99-year contract in November 1755 to produce a weekly paper entitled The Universal Visitor or Monthly Memorialist for Thomas Gardner and Edmund Allen. However, the strain of publishing caused Smart to have a seizure, and he was unable to keep up with the publishing of the paper. Allen was a friend of Samuel Johnson, and it was Samuel Johnson, along with many other friends of Smart, who contributed to the magazine in order to help Smart keep up with his contract. In March 1756, Newbery published, without Smart's authority, his final "Seatonian Prize" poem, On the Goodness of the Supreme Being, and later, on 5 June, he published, again without Smart's authority, his Hymn to the Supreme Being, a poem which thanked God for recovery from an illness of some kind, possibly a "disturbed mental state". The Hymn to the Supreme Being marks the time in Smart's life after the mysterious "fit" was resolved and the beginning of his obsession with religion and his praying "without ceasing".

=== Asylum confinement ===
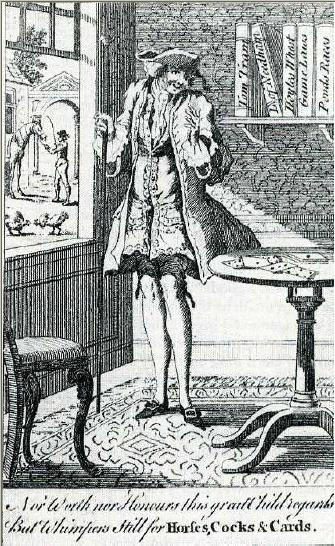
A caricature of Christopher Smart in Tommy Tagg's book published by John Newbery

A "Commission of Lunacy" was taken out against Smart, and he was admitted to St Luke's Hospital for Lunatics on 6 May 1757 as a "Curable Patient". It is possible that Smart was confined by Newbery over old debts and a poor relationship between the two; Newbery had previously mocked Smart and his immorality in his A Collection of Pretty Poems for the Amusement of Children six Foot High. Regardless of the exact reasons, there is evidence suggesting that Newbery's admittance of Smart into the mental asylum was not based on "madness". However, there is also evidence that an incident of some kind took place in St James's Park in which Smart started to pray loudly in public until he had "routed all the company" (Jubilate Agno B89).

It is not known what exactly happened during his confinement, but Smart did work on two of his most famous poems, Jubilate Agno and A Song to David. What is known is that he may have been in a private madhouse before St Luke's and that he was later moved from St Luke's to Mr. Potter's asylum until his release. At St Luke's, he transitioned from being "curable" to "incurable", and was moved to Mr. Potter's asylum for monetary reasons. During this time, Anna left and took the children with her to Ireland. His isolation led him into writing religious poetry, although he abandoned the traditional genres of the 18th century that marked his earlier poetry when he wrote Jubilate Agno. Although it is debated as to whether his turning inward to examine himself in his poetry represents an evangelical type of Christianity, his poetry during his isolation does show a desire for "unmediated revelation". There is an "inner light" that serves as a focal point for Smart and his poems written during this time, and that inner light connects him to the Christian God.

Smart was left alone, except for his cat Jeoffry and the occasional gawker. It is very possible that he felt "homeless" during this time and surely felt that he was in a "limbo … between public and private space". In London, only a few of his works were still being published. However, not everyone viewed Smart's "madness" as problematic, and Johnson defended him, sometimes seriously and sometimes comically, many times. A century later, Robert Browning remarked that A Song to David was great because Smart was mad, and that the poem allowed him to rank alongside of Milton and Keats.

He was discharged from St. Luke's asylum uncured after one year. He was thought to be confined elsewhere for the following seven years, during which time he wrote Jubilate Agno. Elizabeth, his daughter, claimed: "He grew better, and some misjudging friends who misconstrued Mr Newbery's great kindness in placing him under necessary & salutary restriction which might possibly have eventually wrought a cure, invited him to dinner and he returned to his confinement no more." Although this may be a misstatement of the events, Smart did leave the asylum on 30 January 1763.

=== Final years ===
A Song to David was printed on 6 April 1763 along with a proposal for a new translation of the Psalms. It is said that Smart composed the poem during his second period of confinement to an asylum during an episode of religious mania The poem was received harshly, which was possibly just thinly veiled personal attacks over Smart being freed from the asylum just weeks before. However, Kenrick, Smart's former rival, praised the poem in one of his own printed on 25 May 1763. Also, John Lockman followed on 21 June 1763, with his own poem in praise of Smart's and Samuel Boyce followed this on 15 July 1763 with another. Along with this support, Smart responded to his critics at the Critical Review; in regards to Smart's response, the Critical Review claimed that they would "say no more of Mr. Smart".

After A Song to David, he tried to publish a collection of his Psalms translations, and Newbery sought to ruin him by hiring James Merrick to produce his own translations. Newbery then hired Smart's new publisher, James Fletcher, which in turn forced Smart to find a new publisher, delaying the printing of his Psalms. Finally, on 12 August 1765, he printed A Translation of the Psalms of David, which included Hymns and Spiritual Songs and a second edition of A Song to David. This work was criticised by Tobias Smollett who was working with Newbery at the time, and Newbery's edition by Merrick was constantly compared with Smart's. However, modern criticism has received Smart's version in a more favourable light. While working on this project, he was also working on a translation of the Phaedrus and a verse translation of Horace. His verse Horace was published in July 1767 including a preface in which he attacked Newbery, but the attack was in vain because Newbery died soon after.

On 20 April 1770, Smart was arrested for debt. On 11 January 1771, he was tried by Lord Mansfield, the gentleman who originally introduced Smart to Alexander Pope, and he was soon recommended to the King's Bench Prison. Although he was in prison, Charles Burney purchased the "Rules" (allowing him some freedom), and Smart's final weeks may have been peaceful although pathetic. In his final letter, Smart begged for money from Rev. Mr. Jackson, saying: "Being upon recovery from a fit of illness, and having nothing to eat, I beg you to send me two or three shillings which (God willing) I will return, with many thanks, in two or three days." On 20 May 1771, Smart died from either liver failure or pneumonia shortly after completing his final work, Hymns, for the Amusement of Children.

=== Death ===
In response to his uncle's death, Christopher Hunter wrote, "I trust he is now at peace; it was not his portion here." Fanny Burney, in her journal, wrote:

But now I speak of authors, let me pay the small tribute of regret and concern due to the memory of poor Mr. Smart, who died lately in the King's Bench Prison; a man by nature endowed with talents, wit, and vivacity, in an eminent degree; and whose unhappy loss of his sense was a public as well as private misfortune. I never knew him in his glory, but ever respected him in his decline, from the fine proofs he had left of his better day, and from the account I have heard of his youth from my father, who was then his intimate companion; as, of late years, he has been his most active and generous friend, having raised a kind of fund for his relief, though he was ever in distress. His intellects, so cruelly impaired, I doubt not, affected his whole conduct.

On 22 May 1771, a jury of twelve fellow inmates of the King's Bench Prison declared that Smart "upon the Twentieth day of May Instant died a Natural Death within the Rules of the Prison." He was buried on 26 May in St Paul's Covent Garden.

== Literary themes and styles ==
Christopher Smart received occasional mentions by critics and scholars after his death, especially by Robert Browning, but analysis and commentary on his works increased dramatically with the "discovery" of Jubilate Agno in 1939. Many recent critics approach Smart from a religious perspective (Neil Curry, Harriet Guest, Clement Hawes, Chris Mounsey). However, some also favour a psychology/sexual analysis of his works (Lance Bertelsen, Clemet Hawes, Alan Liu).

=== Religion ===
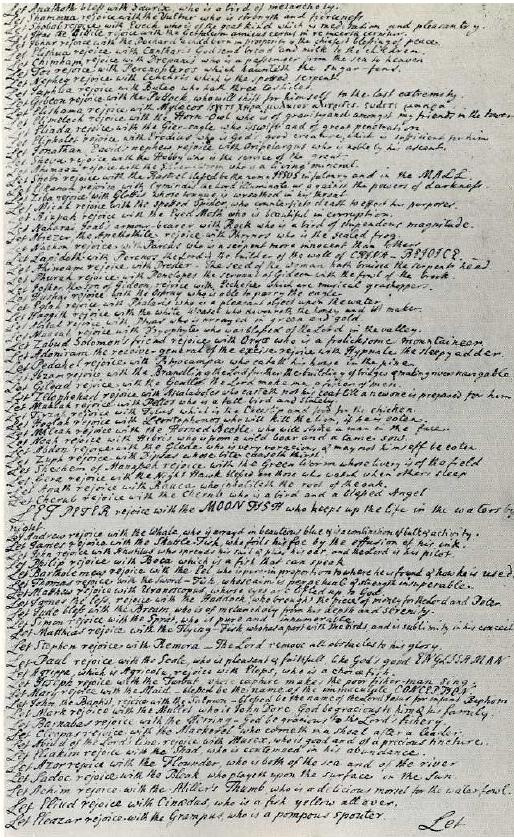
A page from the "Let" side of the Jubilate Agno manuscript

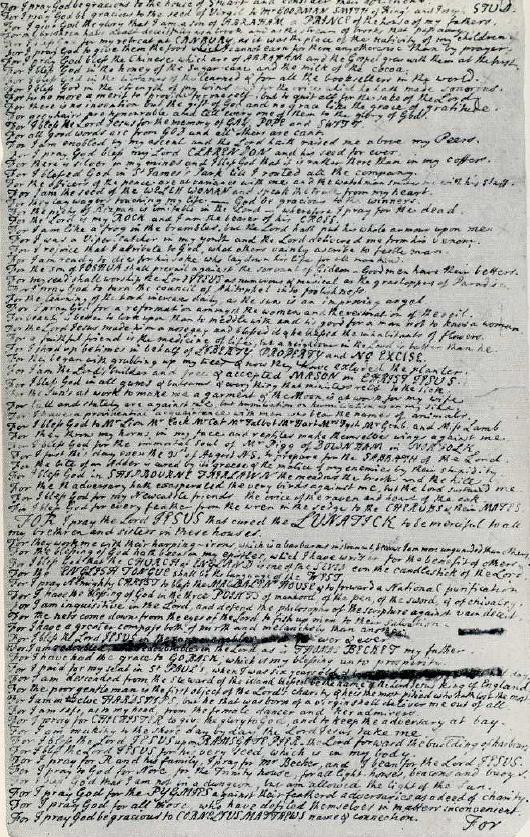
A page from the "For" side of the Jubilate Agno manuscript

Although Smart wrote the "Seatonian Prize" poems early on, there is a contrast between the mimicked Miltonic blank verse and the intense exploration of religion found in his later works. His first "Seatonian Prize" poem, On the Eternity of the Supreme Being is part of two traditional types of religious writing: "authoritative discourse of religious poetry" and "tentative and self-critical discourse of an apparently more personal devotion" In connecting the two, he redefines "the role of the religious poet." By establishing a debate between these two forms, Harriet Guest claims that Smart creates "a poetic space which allows the poet to make provisional, even questionable statements", which are important to his later works. To Guest, Smart, in his religious poems, "is not concerned to offer instruction in Christian conduct." Besides the greater theological debate, the poems are also the origins of Smart's belief that all of creation is constantly praising God, and that a poet must "give voice to mute nature's praise of God."

Jubilate Agno reflects an abandonment of traditional poetic structures in order to explore complex religious thought. His "Let" verses join creation together as he seemingly writes his own version of Biblical poetry. Smart, in Jubilate Agno, plays on words and the meaning behind words in order to participate with the divine that exists within language. Although the original manuscript divided the "Let" and "For" verses onto opposing sides of the manuscript, Karina Williams claims that "Dr W. H. Bond then discovered that some of the LET and FOR folios were numbered and dated concurrently, and that these chronologically parallel texts were further connected by verbal links." This justified her combining the two sides to follow each other. Using this as a model, Guest claims that the "For" verses explore religion with a "personal tone" and the "Let" are "unambiguous" and deal with public matters. Jeanne Walker goes further than Guest and claims that the "Let " and "For" sections are united with the Hebrew tradition and "iterate both present and future simultaneously, that is, they redeem time."

Words and language connect the poet to divine revelation, and God is the "great poet" who used language in order to create the universe. Through words and language, Smart attempted to capture the creative power of those words. By relying on the power of words, Smart is, according to Clement Hawes, subverting "Anglican control over religious functions and services." In essence, Smart's approach to religion in Jubilate Agno is comparable to John Wesley's theological dictum and to the writings of John Perro and William Bowling. He also creates his own natural philosophy and criticizes science, like that established by Isaac Newton, for their ignoring "the glory of Almighty God."

To Smart, each piece of matter is alive because it is connected to God, and matter cannot be described in a cold manner that disconnects it from this reality. However, Smart accomplished his new science by relying on Newtonian empiricism. As part of his desire to bring back the divine language to poetry and science, he creates an "Ark of Salvation" in order to describe a prophetic and apocalyptic future which emphasises the importance of Christ and England. Along with being prophetic, the poem itself is modelled after the canticles and follows the form of the Benedicite. The Benedicite is not the only model however, and there is a strong link between Jubilate Agno and the psalm tradition.

Smart's A Song to David is an attempt to bridge poetry written by humans and Biblical poetry. The Biblical David plays an important role in this poem just as he played an important role in Jubilate Agno However, David in Jubilate Agno is an image of the creative power of poetry whereas he becomes a fully realized model of the religious poet. By focusing on David, Smart is able to tap into the "heavenly language." Many critics have focused on the role of David as planner of Solomon's Temple and his possible role with the Freemasons. However, the true life of the poem comes later when Christ is introduced as the major subject. After Christ is introduced, Smart attempts to "reach to heaven" and the final passages, to Neil Curry, represent a "final rush for glory."

According to Mounsey, A Song to David and Smart's Psalms is an attempt to "Christianize" the Old Testament through writing an 18th-century psalter. However, the Psalms perform a secondary function: they allow Smart to relate to the suffering of David and to reinforce his own religious convictions by following his Biblical model. As part of Smart's "Christianizing" of the Psalms, Jesus becomes a divine form of suffering, and Smart becomes further juxtaposed with his Biblical model as both praise God for Jesus's ultimate sacrifice and for the beauty of all creation. The Hymns and Psalms form their own sort of liturgy and attempt to reform Anglican liturgy by emphasizing God's place in nature.

Smart's Hymns are modelled after a tradition exemplified by Robert Nelson. They are steeped in Anglican tradition and also emphasize English patriotism and England's divine favour. The Hymns, according to Guest, "[express] a delight in creation that is largely absent from the work of other hymn-writers of the century, unless they are paraphrasing the words of David." To Hawes, the Hymns exemplify an evangelical spirit that separates Smart from the traditional Anglican church. Although he wrote his second set of hymns, Hymns for the Amusement of Children, for a younger audience, Smart cares more about emphasizing the need for children to be moral instead of "innocent". These works have been seen as possibly too complicated for "amusement" because they employ ambiguities and complicated theological concepts. In essence, the Hymns for the Amusement of Children is intended to teach children the specific virtues that make up the subject matter of the work. Like the Hymns for the Amusement of Children, Smart's The Parables of Our Lord and Saviour Jesus Christ were designed to teach morals. However, these Parables alter the original Biblical parables in order to simplify them and help them "make sense" As such, Todd Parker claims that the Parables, and the other religious works of Smart, are part of his final push for the "evangelization of London's reading public."

=== Language ===
The language and commentary on language is of particular emphasis in Jubilate Agno. To Alan Jacobs, Smart's use of language represents his attempt to connect to the "Ur language", allowing Smart to connect to "the Word calling forth the world." This is similar to David and Orpheus's ability as poets to create through their song. In his constant emphasis on the force of poetry, Jubilate Agno takes on the qualities of the Ars Poetica tradition. As such, Smart is attempting to develop a poetic language that will connect him to the "one true, eternal poem." The poetic language that he creates is related to Adam's "onomathetic" tradition, or the idea that names hold significant weight in the universe and that Adam was able to join in with creation by naming objects.

In Jubilate Agno, he describes his writing as creating "impressions". To accomplish this task, he incorporated puns and onomatopoeia in order to emphasize the theological significance of his poetic language. In addition to these techniques, he relied on repeated language and allusions to traditional works and to scripture for a source of authority in various works, especially in his Hymns. Along with scriptural authority, he relies on prophetic rhetoric to gain his audience's sympathy.

During the 18th century, there was a debate over poetic language and the translations of Smart, especially of Horace, positioned him as one who sought to redeem traditional forms and understanding of language. However, some critics, like Alan Liu, believe that translations are effectively forced to compete against the original works, and that Smart's language, at least in his translations, must constantly seek to undermine the original authors, like Horace. Not all critics agree with Liu, and those like Donald Davie believe that the Smart's translations cannot be compared to the original works, but are part of a system of Smart competing against the language of his contemporaries. Thomas Keymer further verified this point about Smart's translations by revealing that the poet claims, in William Toldervy's The History of Two Orphans, "But what heaven-exciting harmony might we not expect from that exalted genius, who can produce such lines as these following!" in anticipation of replacing the previous flawed translations of the Psalms.

Regardless of where he stood on the specific issue of translation Smart believed that there was an importance to language, which carried over to his constant revising of his poems to slowly correct them. Many of Smart's poems served a dual purpose, and when put to music were altered to meet various standards. By constantly revising, he ensured that his poems were always the "authentic" version.

=== Gender ===
Smart's role as Mrs. Midnight along with his gendered comments in Jubilate Agno form the focal point for analysing his understanding of sexuality and gender. With Mrs. Midnight, Smart challenges the traditional social order found in 18th-century England. However, some, like Lance Bertelsen, argue that the Mrs. Midnight persona reveals a split personality torn between masculine and feminine roles. Fraser Easton say the existence of Mrs. Midnight proves that Smart identified a female connection to poetry and her character was used to defy popular 18th-century notions of who is able to attain knowledge. This role allowed Smart to focus on "social and sexual dimensions" in his satire. However, there is a potentially darker side to Mrs. Midnight, and she could represent his feelings that he was "emasculated by economic pressures."

The image of "horns" in Jubilate Agno is commonly viewed as a sexual image. Easton puts particular emphasis on the image of horns as a phallic image and contends that there are masculine and feminine horns throughout Smart's poem. Hawes picks up this theme and goes on to claims that the poem shows "that [Smart] had been 'feminized' as a cuckold." In response to this possible cuckolding, Jubilate Agno predicts a misogynistic future while simultaneously undermining this effort with his constant associations to female creation.

=== Environmental ===
Smart had a reputation for being a "dedicated gardener". His poem The Hop-Garden helped to further this reputation, and even during his stay in a mental asylum he convinced others of his bond with nature. Johnson witnessed Smart's time in asylum and stated, "he has partly as much exercise as he used to have, for he digs in the garden." Gardening, to Smart, was a way in which humans could interact with nature and actually "improve" on the natural landscape.

However, Smart did not only write about gardens and vegetation, and his focus on his cat Jeoffry is widely known and his focus on nature connects him to those mistreated and neglected by 18th-century society. The first fragment of Jubilate Agno is a poetic "Ark" that pairs humans with animals in order to purify all of creation. The whole work relies on his extensive background in botany and his knowledge of taxonomy. He actively participated in the 18th-century taxonomy systems established by Carl Linnaeus; however, Smart is mythologising his view of nature and creation when he adds information from Pliny the Elder into his work.

By using this knowledge, Smart was able to give a "voice" to nature; he believed that nature, like his cat Jeoffry, is always praising God but needs a poet in order to bring out that voice. As such, themes of animals and language are merged in Jubilate Agno, and Jeoffry is transformed into a manifestation of the Ars Poetica tradition.

=== Freemasonry ===
Many critics have focused on the role of David as planner of Solomon's Temple and his possible role with the Freemasons. Although it is not known for sure whether Smart was a Freemason or not, there is evidence suggesting that he was either part of the organization or had a strong knowledge of its belief system. Based on personal admittance to contributing to A Defence of Freemasonry, contemporary verification of his participation in the volume and with Masonic meetings, there is enough to confirm "his participation in Masonic affairs." Furthermore, there are accounts of Smart attending meetings at the Bell Tavern in Westminster. The information available has led Marie Roberts to declare in her 1986 book British Poets and Secret Societies, "It has been universally accepted by scholars that Christopher Smart ... was a Freemason yet no record of his membership has been traced." However, in the notes to Chris Mounsey's 2001 book Christopher Smart: Clown of God, Marie Roberts' 1986 book is referred to as "an account of Smart's work which accepts his association with the Freemasons," but in Mounsey's view, "Since neither Smart's name nor his pseudonyms appear in the records of the Freemasons, it is highly unlikely he was ever one of their number."

Smart's involvement with Masonry can be traced through his poems, including Jubilate Agno and A Song to David, with his constant references to Masonic ideas and his praise of Freemasonry in general. In Jubilate Agno, Smart declares "I am the Lord's builder and free and accepted MASON in CHRIST JESUS" (B 109). This declaration of being a "free and accepted MASON" has been interpreted to define his connection to speculative Masonry. The "in Christ Jesus" declaration places Smart within a Christian version of Masonry. He also declares himself to be "the Lord's builder" and this connects his life with the building of King Solomon's Temple, an important Masonic idea. In A Song to David, Smart returns to the building of Solomon's Temple and incorporates many of the Masonic images that he uses in Jubilate Agno.

It was this detail that encouraged many critics to try to decode the "seven pillar" section of A Song of David along the lines of Masonic imagery. The poem follows two traditional sets of motions common to Freemason writing that mimic the image of Jacob's Ladder: movement from earth to heaven and movement from heaven to earth. This image further connects Freemason belief surrounding the relationship of David to Solomon's Temple. While these images, and further images in A Song to David are related also to depictions of the Temple in Isaac Newton's Chronology of Ancient Kingdoms Amended (1728), the John Bunyan's Solomon's Temple Spiritualiz'd (1688), and to the Geneva Bible, these works were relied on by the Freemasons.

Based on this theory, the first pillar, the Greek alpha, represents the mason's compass and "God as the Architect of the Universe." The second, the Greek gamma, represents the mason's square. In addition, the square represents the "vault of heaven." The third, the Greek eta, represents Jacob's ladder itself and is connected to the complete idea of seven pillars. The fourth, the Greek theta, is either "the all-seeing eye or the point within a circle." The fifth letter, the Greek iota, represents a pillar and the temple. The sixth letter, the Greek sigma, is an incomplete hexagram, otherwise known as "the blazing star or hexalpha" to the Freemasons. The last, the Greek omega, represents a lyre and David as a poet.

== Works ==
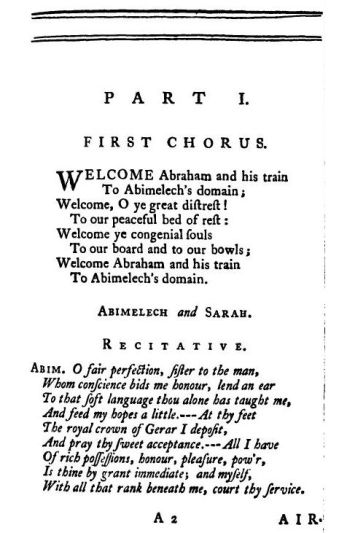
First page of Abimelech (1768)

Smart, throughout his career, published many known works. Although his works are far too many to list, a few of his most famous and important publications during his life include:

- A Song to David
- Poems on Several Occasions (including the Hop-Garden)
- The Hilliad
- The Hop-Garden
- Hymns and Spiritual Songs
- Epistle to Mrs. Tyler
- Psalm 58
- Psalm 114
- On A Lady Throwing Snow-Balls At Her Lover
- For I Will Consider My Cat Jeoffry
- On My Wife's Birth-Day
- The Sweets Of Evening
- Where's The Poker?
- The Pig
- The Long-Nosed Fair
- Hymns for the Amusement of Children
- The Oratorios Hannah and Abimelech
- The Parables of Our Lord and Saviour Jesus Christ
- A Poetical Translation of the Fables of Phaedrus
- The "Seatonian Prize" poems
- A Translation of the Psalms of David
- The Works of Horace Prose and Verse

One of his most famous poems, Jubilate Agno, was not published until 1939, by William Force Stead. In 1943, lines from this poem were set to music by Benjamin Britten with the translated title Rejoice in the Lamb. Composer Beryl Price also used Smart's text for her composition A Cycle of Cats.

He is also credited with the writing of A Defence of Freemasonry (1765), also known as A Defence of Freemasonry as practised in the regular lodges, both foreign and domestic, under the Constitution of the English Grand Master, in which is contained a refutation of Mr. Dermott's absurd and ridiculous account of Freemasonry, in his book entitled 'Ahiman Rezon' and the several queries therein reflecting on the regular Masons, briefly considered and answered, that response to Laurence Dermott's Ahiman Rezon. Although there is no direct attribution on the text's title page, it was established as his work since its publication, and it includes a poem directly attributed to him.

A two-volume edition of the Complete Poems of Christopher Smart was published in 1949 by Norman Callan, Professor of English at Queen Mary College, London (now University). There have been numerous reprints. Penguin published Selected Poems in 1990.
