= 1783 in literature =

This article contains information about the literary events and publications of 1783.

== Events ==
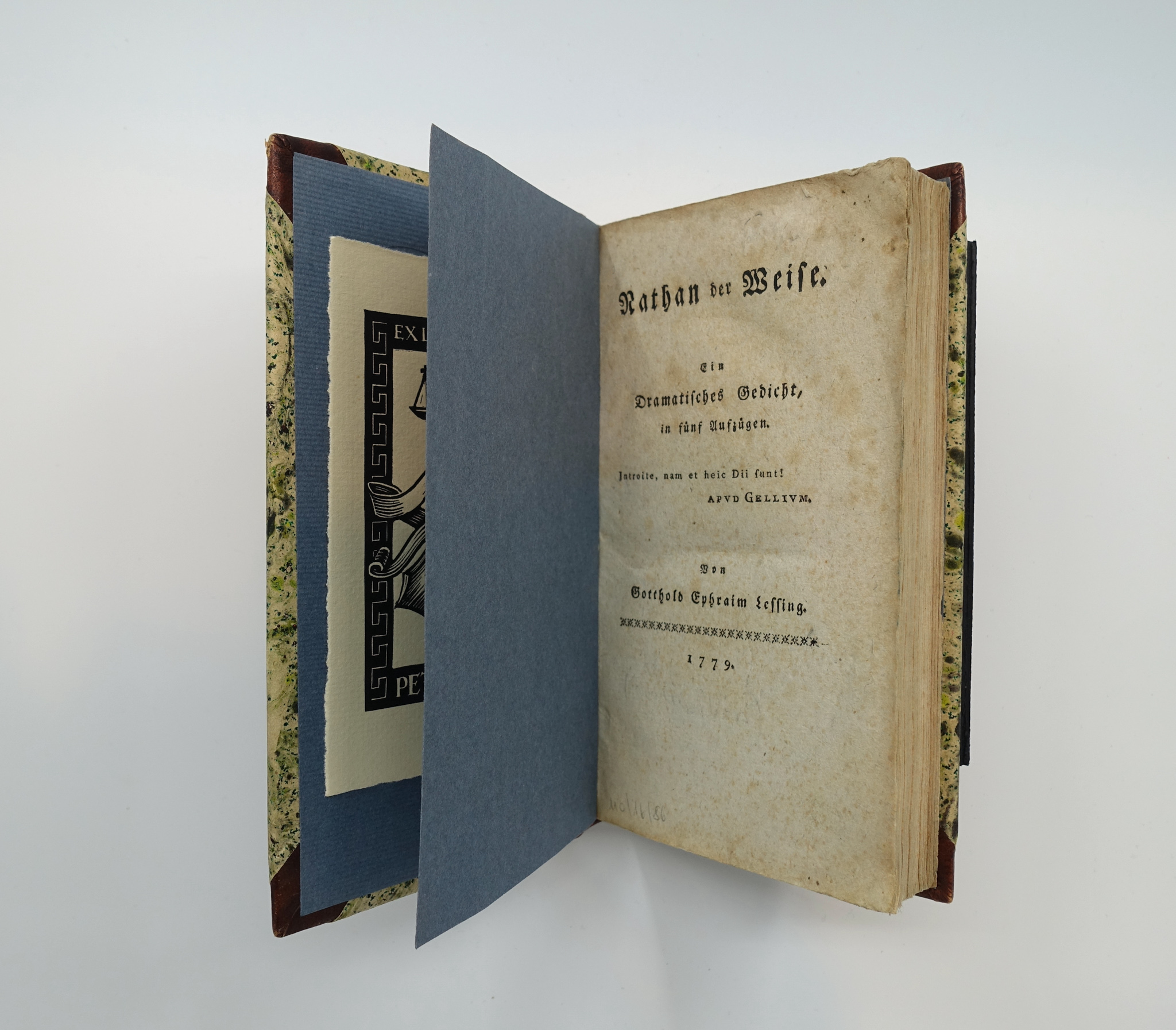
Second edition of Nathan the Wise in its first year of publication, 1779, in the collection of the Jewish Museum of Switzerland

- April 14 – Gotthold Ephraim Lessing's drama Nathan the Wise receives its first professional performance, at the Döbbelinsches Theater of Berlin.The centerpiece of the work is the "Ring Parable", narrated by Nathan when asked by Saladin which religion is true: an heirloom magic ring has the magical ability to render its owner pleasing in the eyes of both God and mankind. It had been passed down from father to son. For generations, each father had bequeathed the ring to the son he loved most. When it came to a father with three sons whom he loved equally, he promised it (in "pious weakness") to each of them. Looking for a way to keep his promise, he had two replicas made, which were indistinguishable from the original, and gave on his deathbed a ring to each of them.The brothers quarreled over who owned the real ring. A wise judge admonished them that it was impossible to tell at that time – that it even could not be discounted that all three rings were replicas, the original one having been lost at some point in the past; that to find out whether one of them had the real ring, it was up to them to live in such a way that their ring's powers could be proven true, to live a life that is pleasant in the eyes of God and mankind rather than expecting the ring's miraculous powers to do so. Nathan compares this to religion, saying that each of us lives by the religion we have learned from those we respect.
- May 6 – William Cobbett arrives in London to work, and later in the year joins the 54th (West Norfolk) Regiment of Foot.
- September – Friedrich Schiller, having left Stuttgart for Weimar to avoid persecution, becomes resident dramatist at Mannheim.
- November 18 – August von Kotzebue leaves St Petersburg to take up a position with the high court of appeal in Reval, then subject to the Russian Empire.

== New books ==
=== Fiction ===
- Jozef Ignác Bajza – René
- Rhijnvis Feith – Julia
- Thomas Holcroft – The Family Picture
- Sophia Lee – The Recess
- Johann Karl August Musäus – Volksmärchen der Deutschen (second volume)
- Clara Reeve – The Two Mentors

=== Children ===
- Thomas Day (anonymously) – The History of Sandford and Merton (first of three story books)
- Ellenor Fenn (as Mrs. Teachwell) – Cobwebs to Catch Flies
- Dorothy Kilner (as M. P.) – The Life and Perambulation of a Mouse
- Mary Ann Kilner
  - A Course of Lectures for Sunday Evenings. Containing religious advice to young persons
  - (as S. S.) The Adventures of a Pincushion

=== Drama ===
- Vittorio Alfieri – Agamennone
- Frances Brooke – Roxina
- Hannah Cowley – Which is the Man?
- Richard Cumberland – The Mysterious Husband
- John O'Keeffe – The Poor Soldier
- William Jackson – The Metamorphosis
- Samuel Jackson Pratt – The School for Vanity

=== Poetry ===
- Lady Anne Barnard – Auld Robin Gray (ballad) (published anonymously)
- William Blake – Poetical Sketches
- Judith Cowper – The Progress of Poetry
- George Crabbe – The Village
- Joseph Ritson – A Select Collection of English Songs
- John Wolcot (as Peter Pindar) – More Lyric Odes, to the Royal Academicians

See also 1783 in poetry

=== Non-fiction ===
- James Beattie – Dissertations Moral and Critical
- William Beckford – Dreams, Waking Thoughts and Incidents
- Hugh Blair – Lectures on Rhetoric and Belles Lettres
- Edmund Burke – Letter on the Penal Laws Against Irish Catholics
- Adam Ferguson – History of the Progress and Termination of the Roman Republic
- William Godwin – Life of Lord Chatham
- Immanuel Kant – Prolegomena to Any Future Metaphysics That Will Be Able to Present Itself as a Science
- Vicesimus Knox – Elegant Extracts
- Mémoires secrets (anonymous)
- Moses Mendelssohn – Jerusalem
- Ezra Stiles – The United States elevated to Glory and Honor
- Horace-Bénédict de Saussure – Essai sur l'hygrométrie

== Births ==
- January 23 – Stendhal (Marie-Henri Beyle), French novelist (died 1842)
- April 3 – Washington Irving, American short story writer, essayist and politician (died 1859)
- May 14 – Samuel Lee, English orientalist and linguist (died 1852)
- September 23 – Jane Taylor, English poet and novelist (died 1824)
- December 10 – María Bibiana Benítez, Puerto Rican poet and playwright (died c. 1873)

== Deaths ==
- January 2 – Johann Jakob Bodmer, Swiss journalist and critic writing in German (born 1698)
- April 17 – Louise d'Epinay French writer and salon hostess (born 1726)
- September 6 – Anna Williams, Welsh-born poet (born 1706)
- October 10 – Henry Brooke, Irish novelist, playwright, and poet (born 1703)
- October 29 – Jean le Rond d'Alembert, French mathematician and philosopher (born 1717)
- November 3 – Charles Collé, French dramatist and songwriter (born 1709)
- November 23 – Ann Eliza Bleecker, American poet, novelist and letter writer (born 1752)
