= List of 18th-century British children's literature authors =

This is a list of 18th-century British children's literature authors (arranged by year of birth):

- Isaac Watts (1674–1748)
- Sarah Fielding (1710–1768)
- John Newbery (1713–1767)
- Christopher Smart (1722–1771)
- Oliver Goldsmith (1728–1774)
- Dorothy Kilner (1735–1836)
- Sarah Trimmer (1741–1810)
- Anna Laetitia Barbauld (1743–1825)
- Ellenor Fenn (1743–1813)
- Hannah More (1745–1833)
- John Aikin (1747–1822)
- Thomas Day (1748–1789)
- Charlotte Smith (1749–1806)
- Mary Ann Kilner (1753–1831)
- Maria Elizabetha Jacson (1755–1829)
- Dorothy Kilner (1755–1836)
- Maria Edgeworth (1767–1849)
- Lucy Peacock (fl. 1775–1816)
- Charles Lamb (1775 – 1834)
