= List of 18th-century British children's literature titles =

This is a list of 18th-century British children's literature titles (ordered by year of publication):

- A Little Book for Little Children (1702) by Thomas White
- A Token for Children (1709) by James Janeway
- Divine Songs (1715) by Isaac Watts
- A Description of Three Hundred Animals (1730) by Thomas Boreman
- The Gigantick History of the Two Famous Giants (1730) by Thomas Boreman
- Winter-Evening Entertainments (1737) by Nathaniel Crouch
- The History of Fortunatus (1740) author unknown, translator Thomas Churchyard
- A Little Pretty Pocket-Book (1744) published by John Newbery
- Tommy Thumb's Pretty Song Book (1744) by Mary Cooper
- The Governess, or The Little Female Academy (1749) by Sarah Fielding
- The Lilliputian magazine (1752) published by John Newbery
- The History of Little Goody Two-Shoes (1765) published by John Newbery
- The Parables of Our Lord and Saviour Jesus Christ (1768) by Christopher Smart
- Hymns for the Amusement of Children (1771) by Christopher Smart
- Lessons for Children (1778–79) by Anna Laetitia Barbauld
- An Easy Introduction to the Knowledge of Nature (1780) by Sarah Trimmer
- Hymns in Prose for Children (1781) by Anna Laetitia Barbauld
- Sacred Dramas (1782) by Hannah More
- The Life and Perambulation of a Mouse (1783) by Dorothy Kilner
- Cobwebs to Catch Flies (1783) by Ellenor Fenn
- The History of Sandford and Merton (1783–89) by Thomas Day
- Anecdotes of a Boarding School (1784) by Dorothy Kilner
- The Female Guardian (1784) by Ellenor Fenn
- A Description of a Set of Prints of Scripture History (1786) by Sarah Trimmer
- Fabulous Histories (1786) by Sarah Trimmer
- The History of Little Jack (1788) by Thomas Day
- Original Stories from Real Life (1788) by Mary Wollstonecraft
- The Parent's Assistant (1796) by Maria Edgeworth
- Adventures of a Pincushion (1780–1783) by Mary Ann Kilner
- Evenings at Home (1794–98) by John Aikin and Anna Laetitia Barbauld
- Keeper’s Travels in Search of His Master (1798) by Edward Augustus Kendall
- The Rational Brutes (1799) by Dorothy Kilner

== See also ==
- Books in the United Kingdom
