= List of 18th-century British children's literature illustrators =

This is a list of 18th-century British children's literature illustrators:

- Thomas Bewick (1753–1828)
- William Blake (1757–1827)

== See also ==
- List of 18th-century British children's literature authors
- List of 18th-century British children's literature titles
