= John Evans (publisher) =

English printer and publisher of street literature

- Born: Baptized 18 November 1753, London, St Giles Cripplegate
- Died: Buried 13 March 1820; London, Bunhill Fields
- Occupations: Publisher, printer, printseller, medicine seller
- Spouse(s): 1. Mary Roberts (m.1778); 2. Mary Dawes (m.1793)
- Children: John Edward, Mary, James, Charles, Elizabeth, William & Benjamin Evans.
- Parent(s): Thomas Evans, Silversmith and Elizabeth Evans.

John Evans (1753–1820) was a London publisher who specialized in Street literature, popular prints, religious tracts, and children's literature. He also sold patent medicines in association with William Howard. John Evans was notable as one of the printers and publishers of the Cheap Repository Tracts 1797–1820. He was based in Long Lane, London where he printed The Black Prince an account of the life of John Naimbanna.

== Life ==
John Evans was baptised 18 November 1753 in the parish church of St Giles without Cripplegate, London, the second son of Thomas. He married Mary Roberts at St Sepulchre's church 5 February 1778. They had five children, all of whom were baptized in St Sepulchre's church: John Edward, 20 February 1785; Mary, 20 June 1786; James, 27 April 1788, Charles 3 January 1790, Elizabeth 10 January 1791. Following the death of his first wife, he married Mary Dawes 30 August 1793, at St Giles without Cripplegate, London. They had, William, baptised 7 April 1793 and Benjamin Evans, baptized 14 December 1794. He died 13 March 1820 and was buried in Bunhill Fields, London 13 March 1820.

== Career ==
In June 1779 Evans was employed by Richard Marshall, printer and publisher, of No. 4, Aldermary Churchyard, and was a witness to his will. Following Richard's death later that same year he continued working for Richard Marshall's successors, the firm of John Marshall and Co. In 1783 the partners employed Evans to manage their wholesale bookshop at 42 Long Lane, West Smithfield on their behalf. In November 1795 Evans entered a list of twelve small books he had published in the Stationers Register.

=== 42 Long Lane ===
In 1787 the partners agreed to let Evans operate the shop in his own name, “to avoid being liable to serve parish and other offices,” although they continued to pay the operating costs, his salary, and provide the stock. A further 10-year contract from 1 January 1790 was signed by Evans with John Marshall (publisher) following the dissolution of the partnership. In March 1791, Evans received a proposal to become the London agent for a Dr. Waite in the sale of his “Worm Medicine.” At this time Marshall raised no objection to his employee doing so. However, following the death of Dr. Waite a year later, Evans and another agent, William Howard of Reading, jointly purchased the rights to manufacture and sell the medicine. Marshall became concerned with his employee's side-lines and following a dispute he dismissed Evans and sought to regain possession of his shop, only to find that Evans had secretly renegotiated the renewal of the lease in his own name. The matter was taken to the Court of Chancery by Marshall and was decided in his favour, forcing Evans and his new partner to leave. At first Evans refused to move and occupied half of the shop and set up a press where he printed copies of several of Marshall's publication. However Marshall obtained a writ of execution and he did eventually move into small premises next door to 41 Long Lane 29 September 1793, taking with him Marshall's business records. Marshall also retaliated by marketing his own counterfeit version of Dr Waite's Worm medicine which was advertised in the London press. Marshall also made further complaint to the court regarding Evans’ conduct.

=== 41 Long Lane ===
John Evans was in business at 41 Long Lane, in opposition to John Marshall next door between September 1793 and March 1796, where he printed a range of street literature publications and cheap books for children. Evans was eventually forced to return Marshall's business records and pay him compensation.

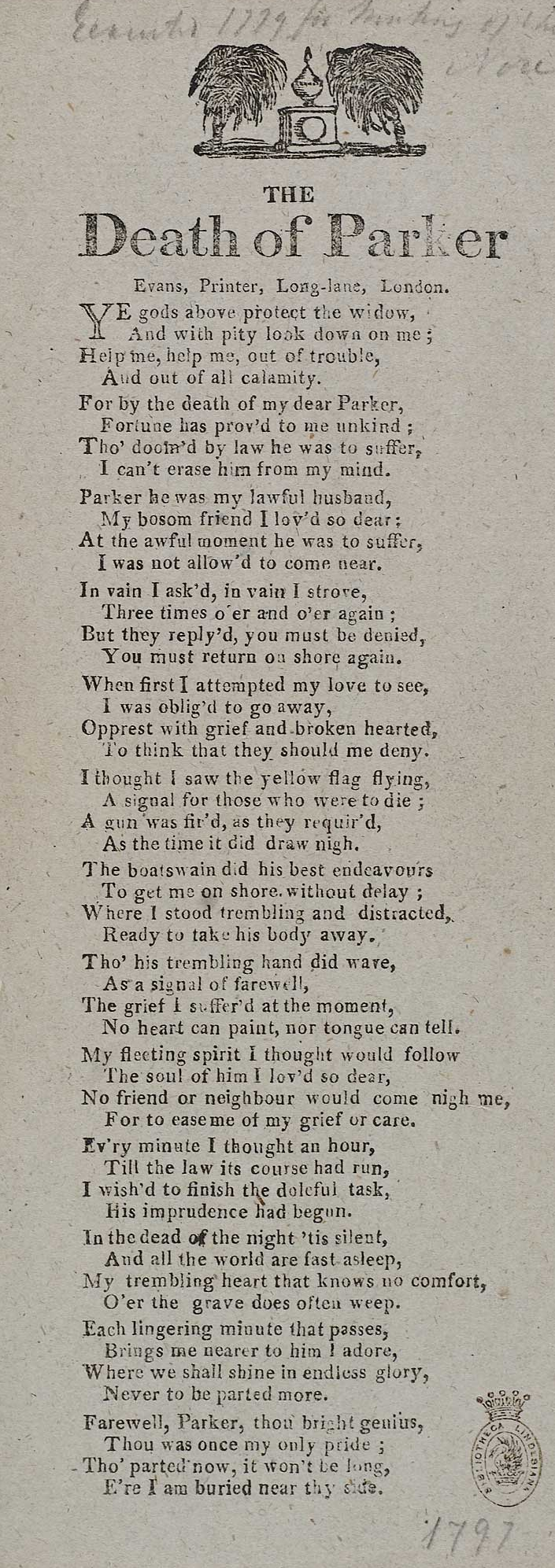
An early slip song printed by John Evans

=== 41 & 42 Long Lane ===
John Marshall gave up the lease of 42 Long Lane at Easter 1796 in order to concentrate on publishing Hannah More's Cheap Repository Tracts, to which he had been appointed the sole printer in February 1796. Following a dispute with Hannah More in the autumn of 1797 John Marshall resigned his post of Printer to the Cheap Repository and John Evans was appointed in his place. Evans and Howard took up the vacant lease and thereafter operated from both premises. Initially the publishing business used the imprint J. Evans or John Evans, but during 1799 a formal partnership with Howard was formed and the imprint became J. Evans & Co. (1799–1801) and then Howard and Evans. The business continued to print new tract titles until December 1797, and thereafter reprints of the existing titles until the 1830s. William Howard died 11 April 1811, and for a brief period the business reverted to using the imprint ‘John Evans’. before becoming ‘John Evans and Son,’ in 1812, and ‘John Evans and Sons between 1818 and 1820.

== Death ==
John Evans died in March 1820 and his business was continued by his two elder sons, John Edward and Charles Evans. until c. 1828. Thereafter, John Edward continued alone at 42 Long Lane until 1839, the following year moving to 62 Snowhill where he continued until 1844.

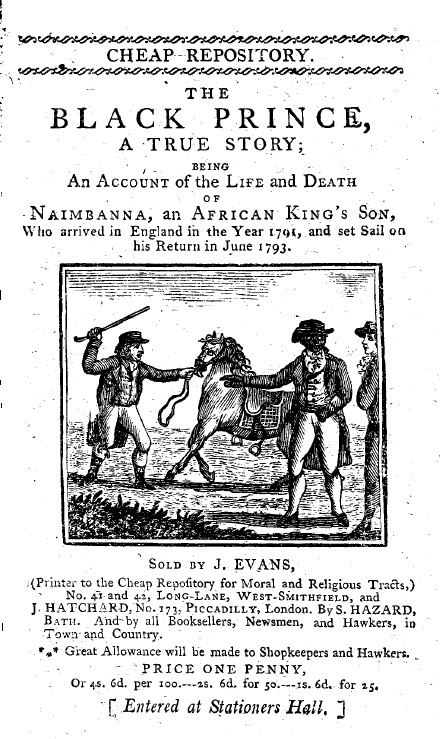
The Black Prince, printed by John Evans in 1798.
