= Lucy Peacock =

British author, editor, translator, bookseller and publisher

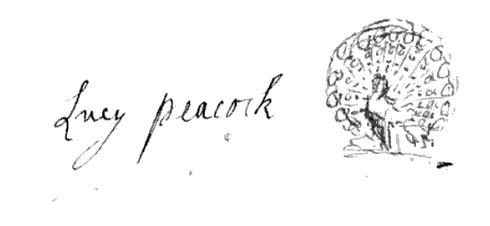
- Lucy Peacock's signature from a signed copy of The Adventures of the Six Princesses of Babylon
- Born: May–June 1768? Unknown
- Died: Unknown
- Occupations: Author, publisher, translator, bookseller, publisher
- Writing career
- Subject: Education
- Notable work: Visit for a Week (1794) The Adventures of the Six Princesses of Babylon (1785) The Little Emigrant (1799)

Lucy Peacock (fl. 1785–1816) was a British author, editor, translator, bookseller and publisher of children's books during the late eighteenth century. She wrote anonymously, for children and young adults. Possibly she was married or perhaps in partnership with one or members of her family, since 'R. and L. Peacock,' which published a number of items at the Juvenile Library, No. 259, Oxford-Street from at least 1796 to 1810.

== Life ==
Very little is known about the writer Lucy Peacock other than her works. A Lucy Peacock, daughter of Abraham and Jane Peacock, was christened in Yorkshire on 12 June 1768. However, the writer was living in Lambeth, south London in June 1785, and Peacock appears to have been her married name. She was clearly well-educated and fluent in French. During her life, she wrote, adapted and edited stories for children and young adults to teach them about life and morality [Temes 242]. Between 1796 and 1807 she was also a partner in R & L Peacock, The Juvenile Library, 259 Oxford St. and 9 Chancery La (1805). In 1809 and 1810 she applied for assistance from the Literary Fund on behalf of her friend Elizabeth Helme. She was still alive in 1816 when she edited and published Friendly Labours.

== Works ==
Peacock published her first story, The Adventures of the Six Princesses of Babylon, in Their Travels to the Temple of Virtue: an allegory, (an adaptation for children of Edmund Spenser's Faerie Queene), anonymously in June 1785. One source says that she was only seventeen at the time, and there is no doubt that she was very young for she later refers to ‘the generous allowance made for her youth at the time it was written’. Five editions of this work were 'printed for the author', the early ones by subscription. Later editions were dedicated, by permission, to Princess Mary. This was translated into German by Albrecht Wittenberg and published in Hamburg in 1787.

The Rambles of Fancy, or, Moral and Interesting Tales, in 2 vols (1786), which includes the story transatlantic tale "The Creole," was also published ‘for the author’ and sold by her at 28, Warwick-Street, Golden-Square. She attracted the attention of the publisher John Marshall, and during 1788 she edited The Juvenile Magazine; or, An instructive and entertaining miscellany for youth of both sexes, published by him. This was the second British magazine for children, and included an early problem page. for children ‘to correct their little foibles, and to guide them with propriety in the path of life they are destined to tread’. Contributions were included by Dorothy Kilner (M.P.) and Mary Ann Kilner(S.S.) as well as many of her own tales.

Martin & James or the Reward of Integrity, a Moral Tale Designed for the Improvement of Children, was published by William Darton in (1791) and again by Darton & Harvey in 1798. It was also published in Dublin (1793 and Philadelphia (1794). Following the success of the ‘’Six Princesses of Babylon’’, the author was encouraged to attempt an adaptation from the second book of Faerie Queene in 1793. ‘’The knight of the rose. An allegorical narrative; including histories, adventures, &c. designed for the amusement and moral instruction of youth,’’ was published by Hookham and Carpenter, old Bond-Street; John Marshall, Queen-Street, and the author, then living ‘at the Juvenile Library, No. 259, Oxford-Street.

The Visit for a Week; or, hints on the improvement of time, a didactic tale, was Lucy’s most popular work, entered by her in the Stationers Register August 5th 1794 and published by Hookham and Carpenter and for the author. It had reached ten editions by 1823 and t was translated into French in 1817 by J. E. Lefebvre.

Eleanor and Jessey; or, the Queen of the May and Pastorals in prose. Or, moral tales, for the amusement of youth, were both published by John Marshall without any indication of authorship in 1798, but her translation ‘’A chronological abridgment of universal history’’, 1800, contains a list of books which indicates that they were both written by her.

The Little Emigrant, a Tale. Interspersed with Moral Anecdotes and Instructive Conversations, was entered in the Stationers Register by Peacock December 28th 1798, and published by her 1799. A second edition appeared in 1802, leading to a 5th edition in 1826. A French edition, translated by the author was published by Le Tellier in Paris in 1826.

The Life of a Bee. Related by herself, was advertised in ‘’The Times’’ April 2, 1798, published by John Marshall. The work was adapted from Noël-Antoine Pluche, Spectacle de la nature, and included chatty footnotes to get children interested in natural history. For Patty Primrose, or, The Parsonage House, she returned to the publishers Darton, Harvey, and Darton in 1810), who printed three editions by 1816.

The two volumes of Friendly Labours or, Tales and Dramas for the Amusement and Instruction of Youth, were printed and published in Brentford, by Philp Norbury, and published in London by Baldwin, Cradock, and Joy, Harris, Darton, Harvey and Darton, and Sharpe, in 1815. Her last known work was Emily, or, The Test of Sincerity, published by Marshall in 1816, and again in 1817.

== Translations ==
In addition to her authored works, Lucy translated François Ducray-Duminil's Robinsonade, Lolotte et Fanfan, into English as 'Ambrose and Eleanor; or, The Adventures of Two Children Deserted on an Uninhabited Island,' in 1796. This went through several editions in the UK and US.

On May 19th 1797 'R&L Peacock' entered a collection of fables, fairy tales and moral and amusing stories, in the Stationers Register entitled Recueil de Fables de contes et d’histoires morales et amusantes de l’usage de jeunes gens. In 1802, she translated Historical Grammar, and in 1807, she translated and published A Chronological Abridgment of Universal History, both by Maturin Veyssière La Croze.

== Sources ==
- Todd, Janet M. A Dictionary of British and American women writers, 1660-1800. Rowman & Littlefield Publishers, 1987.
- Rivers, David. Literary Memoirs of Living Authors of Great Britain Arranged According to an Alphabetical Catalogue of Their Names... R. Faulder, 1798, pp. 118-19.
- Lee, Sidney, ed. "Lucy Peacock." Dictionary of National Biography. 44. London: Smith, Elder & Co, 1895.
- Hayton, David W. "Oxford dictionary of national biography." (2010).
- English Short-title catalogue;
- A list of her publications was given in A chronological abridgment of universal history c. 1800.
- Maxted, Ian. Exeter Working Papers in Book History. https://bookhistory.blogspot.com/2007/01/london-1775-1800-p-q.html
- Hillman, William. Ambrose and Eleanor; or the Adventures Of Two Children, Deserted on an Uninhabited Island. http://www.erbzine.com/mag18/ambrose.htm
