= Cheap Repository Tracts =

Physical literary scheme

The Cheap Repository Tracts consisted of more than two hundred moral, religious and occasionally political tracts issued in a number of series between March 1795 and 1817, and subsequently re-issued in various collected editions until the 1830s. They were devised by Hannah More and intended for sale or distribution to literate poor people, as an alternative to what she regarded as the immoral traditional broadside ballad and chapbook publications. The tracts proved to be enormously successful with more than two million copies sold or distributed during the first year of the scheme.

== Background ==
During the early 1790s there was widespread concern about the possibility of a popular uprising in Britain following the French Revolution, and the radical ideas which were circulating in popular publications. The English religious writer and philanthropist Hannah More referred to the ‘corrupt and vicious little books and ballads which have been hung out of windows in the most alluring forms or hawked through town and country.’ Following the commercial success of her Village Politics (1792), which was a rebuttal of Thomas Paine's Rights of Man, she decided that an entire series might be undertaken to provide 'religious and useful knowledge, as an antidote to the poison continually flowing thro’ the channel of vulgar and licentious publications. These, by their cheapness, as well as by their being, unhappily, congenial to a depraved taste, obtain a mischievous popularity among the lower ranks. She, drew up her plan for publishing such works in the West Country during 1794 and circulated it among her friends who encouraged her to extend it to cover the whole country and to appoint London distributors. A committee to form the Cheap Repository for Moral and Religious Tracts was established with Henry Thornton as Treasurer. A printed prospectus was issued listing eighteen titles, to secure subscriptions to underwrite the project.

The new tracts were intended to point out the pitfalls of drunkenness, debauchery, idleness, gambling, riotous assembly, and seeking to rise above one's station, whilst simultaneously praising the virtues of honesty, industry, thrift, patience and an acceptance of one's pre-ordained place in society, by means of simple ballads and short instructive tales. They were published as either octavo chapbooks or else as broadside ballads, emulating the traditional forms of Street literature. Approximately one third of them were designated as ‘Sunday Reading’ and contained simplified Bible stories or else a more specifically religious message.

== Authorship ==
More than half of the official series of tracts were written by Hannah More A further six were perhaps written by her sister Sarah, others by evangelical friends such as the poet William Mason, the philanthropists and campaigners against slavery Zachary Macaulay, John Newton, and Henry Thornton, or else William Gilpin, the artist and writer on the picturesque. A few titles were condensed versions of existing well-known works, such as Isaac Watts's Divine Songs and Daniel Defoe's The History of the Plague in London in 1665, and retellings of Bible stories. The scheme was subsidised by subscriptions from supporters, enabling the publications to be sold at below cost price.

== Publication ==
The individual tracts have a complex bibliographical history often going through many editions and involving several different individuals who were designated 'Printer to the Cheap Repository,' together with many distributors and publishers. Retail sales were made by 'booksellers, newsmen, and hawkers, in town and country.' The most important printers involved were Samuel Hazard of Bath; John Marshall of London, William Watson of Dublin; and John Evans of 42 Long Lane, London. Several tracts were also reprinted in the US by printers in both New York and Philadelphia. Until the end of 1798 the publisher undertaking the work was 'The Cheap Repository', but thereafter the copyrights of the official tracts were sold and later collected editions were published by John and James Rivington for the Society for Promoting Christian Knowledge (S.P.C.K.).

=== Hazard Series (March–May 1795) ===
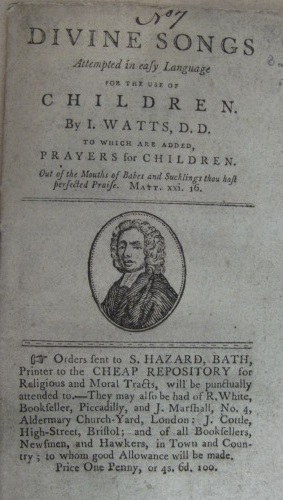
Divine Songs ... for children - the seventh Cheap Repository Tract to be issued, printed at Bath by Samuel Hazard in March 1795

Under More's initial scheme the tracts were all to be printed by Samuel Hazard, of Cheap Street Bath and distributed by him and by John Marshall in London and by Richard White in Westminster. Publication commenced in March 1795 and in the first six weeks (March 3 – April 18, 1795) the Bath Chronicle reported that 300,000 copies were sold wholesale and the presses hardly able to keep pace with orders arriving from all parts of the country. By July of the same year, the number sold had more than doubled; According to the ‘Advertisement’ prefacing one of the collected editions of the tracts: Many persons exerted their influence, not only by circulating the tracts in their own families, in schools, and among their dependants, but also by encouraging booksellers to supply themselves with them; by inspecting retailers and hawkers, to whom they gave a few in the first instance, and afterwards directed them in the purchase; also by recommending the tracts to the occupiers of stalls at fairs, and by sending them to hospitals, workhouses, and prisons. They were also liberally distributed among soldiers and sailors, through the influence of their commanders.

=== Hazard/Marshall Series (May 1795-January 1796) ===
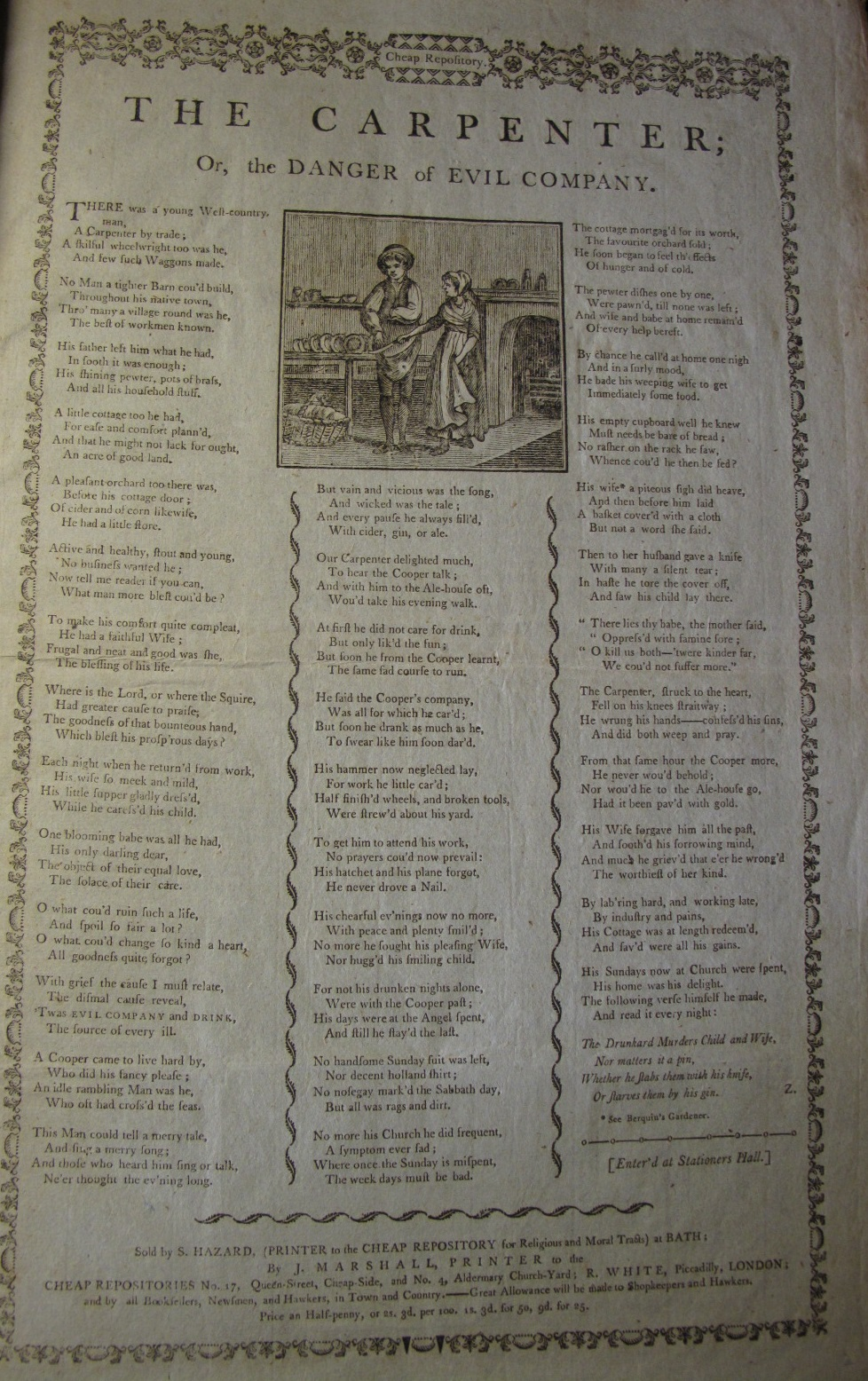
The Carpenter, 1795 in the format of a broadside ballad. Both Hazard and Marshall are described as 'Printer to the Cheap Repository'

By the end of April 1795 it was apparent that Hazard would be unable to cope with the demand for new titles and for reprints from his limited business in Bath and so after the twenty-third tract issued in May 1795 John Marshall (who operated a far more substantial printing and publishing business at 4 Aldermary Churchyard, London) was recruited to become a joint 'Printer to the Cheap Repository'. The next twenty-six or twenty-seven tracts were consequently issued simultaneously in editions printed in London and in Bath. The discrepancy is because one title The middle way is the best appears to have been withdrawn after printing. Marshall also began to print editions of the earlier tracts.

The tracts were still selling well by December 1795, but there continued to be distribution problems, particularly in those parts of the United Kingdom further from London, notably Scotland and the north of England. Hannah More also began to realise that the cost of producing simultaneous editions at two different centres in England was not sustainable in the long term, and she was hearing complaints about the low level of discounts offered to the hawkers who were expected to distribute many of the copies. At the same time she was receiving requests from the wealthier supporters of the scheme for an edition printed on better quality paper in the more compact duodecimo format which might be bound into annual collected volumes. As a result, the publication scheme was re-organised in January 1796, and a new prospectus issued.

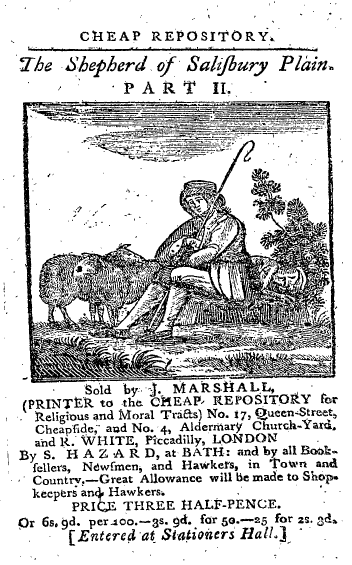
The Shepherd of Salisbury Plain, one of the most popular tracts. Only Marshall is now described as ‘Printer to the Cheap Repository’

=== Marshall Official Series (February 1796-December 1797) ===
Following the re-organisation, John Marshall became the sole printer of the tracts with Samuel Hazard demoted to the role of a distributor. William Watson also was appointed as "Printer to the Cheap Repository" in Dublin and permitted to reprint the existing titles once they had been issued in London. An additional distributor, John Elder, of North Bridge, Edinburgh, was appointed to cover Scotland and Northern England.

A further sixty five new titles were printed and published by John Marshall between February 1796 and December 1797 in the two chapbook formats but the broadside ballad editions were gradually phased out, and the existing ballads were re-issued in small booklets containing three or four titles. Annual collected editions of the tracts were also published for the years 1795 and 1796.

However, as the scheme progressed through 1796 and 1797 Hannah More found it increasingly difficult to find authors for new tracts and relations with her publisher began to deteriorate leading to her decision to reduce the rate of publication to three tracts each quarter after December 1797. John Marshall had by this time devoted virtually the whole of his business to the production and distribution of the tracts and their cessation would have been a financial disaster to him. He was on the point of issuing a third collected volume of the tracts in November 1797 when he quarrelled with More over the ownership of copyrights. This led to his refusal to continue as printer and the main distributor of the tracts, and the appointment of John Evans in his place.

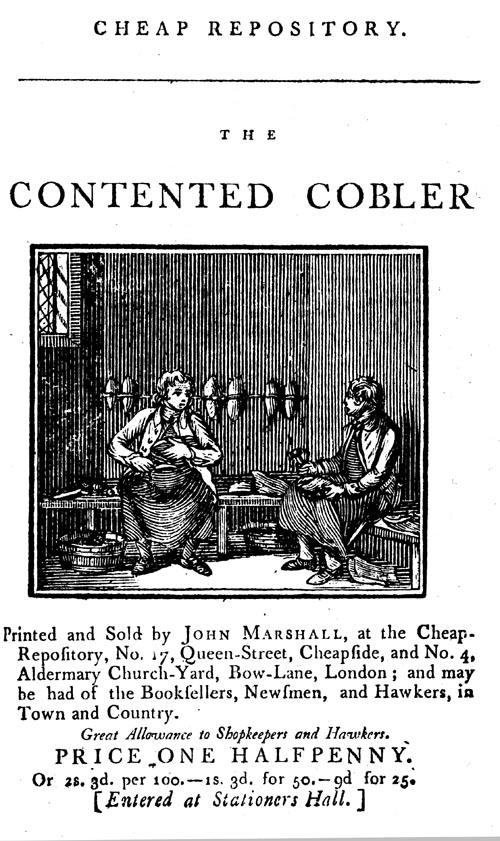
’’The contented cobler’’ (1798) one of John Marshall's 'unofficial' series of tracts.

=== Marshall's 'Unofficial' Series (January 1798-December 1799) ===
Marshall felt aggrieved by his treatment by Hannah More and as an experienced publisher of ballads and chapbooks he had no difficulty in securing further suitable texts to continue the series. He therefore issued a further seventy-three 'unofficial' Cheap Repository tracts on his own over the next two years whilst he reorganised his business. These were similar in format, and general appearance to the official series, often using the same woodcuts, but contained only his name as printer and distributor. They did not always adhere to the same high moral tone of the official series but were sometimes a little racier in content. The official body warned potential purchasers about the status of Marshall's tracts and surviving copies sometimes have the words 'Cheap Repository' obliterated from the title page. However, the different series are often confused with one another. In some examples of the Dublin tracts an official tract was paired with one of Marshall's unofficial tracts. Marshall ceased publishing his series in December 1799.

The history of Charles Jones, the footman, as published in Dublin by William Watson.

=== Watson Dublin Series (1796-1800) ===
In March 1795, Hannah More authorised the Association for the Discountenancing of Vice and Promoting the Knowledge and Practice of Religion and Virtue, in Dublin, (of which she was an honorary member) to reprint her tracts in Ireland. This was undertaken by William Watson, Secretary to the Association, and a printer and bookseller of 7 Capel Street Dublin. He became known as the ‘Printer to the Cheap Repository’ in Ireland. Most of the Irish tracts were reprints of the English equivalents although a few were amended to suit the Irish situation and given new titles. There are also a few tracts that were only issued in Ireland. The Irish editions were also printed more compactly than the English equivalents and so in many cases two of the English titles were combined in one 24-page chapbook. William Watson continued to re-issue tracts until his death in 1805, when he was succeeded by his son, also named William Watson (d. 1818). He was succeeded by his widow, Ann Watson, who continued to issue the tracts well into the 1820s. Further reprints were issued by A. & W. Watson until the early 1830s.

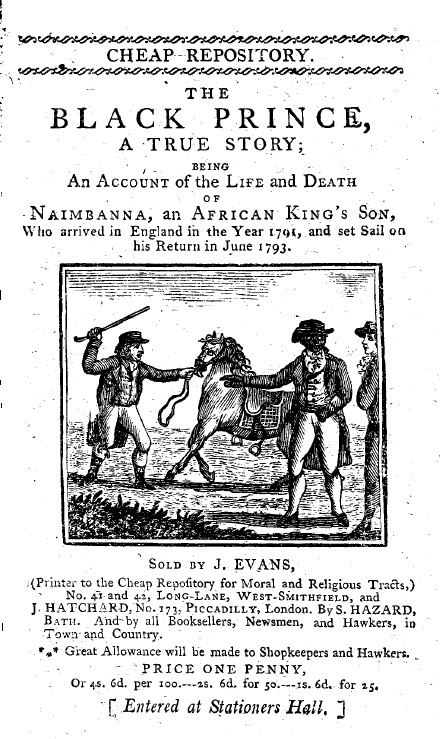
The Black Prince, printed by John Evans in 1798.

=== Evans Official Series (1798-1800) ===
After the resignation of Marshall in December 1797, a further fifteen new titles in the official Cheap Repository Tracts series, written by Hannah More were printed by John Evans. These were issued between December 1797 and October 1798, starting with The fall of Adam, which contained an announcement of the new publishing arrangements.” The new series includes at least one tract, commenting on the Irish Rebellion of 1798, which does not later appear in Hannah More's collected works. These do not appear to have had the same impact as the earlier series of tracts. Nevertheless, reprints of the original individual titles continued to be printed by John Evans and his successors. These included, J. Evans & Co. (1799-1802), Howard and Evans (1802-1811), John Evans (1811), J. Evans and son (c.1812-1817), John Evans and sons (1818–20) and J.& C. Evans (1820-29), and J.E. Evans (1829-1846).

=== Rivington editions (1798-1851) ===
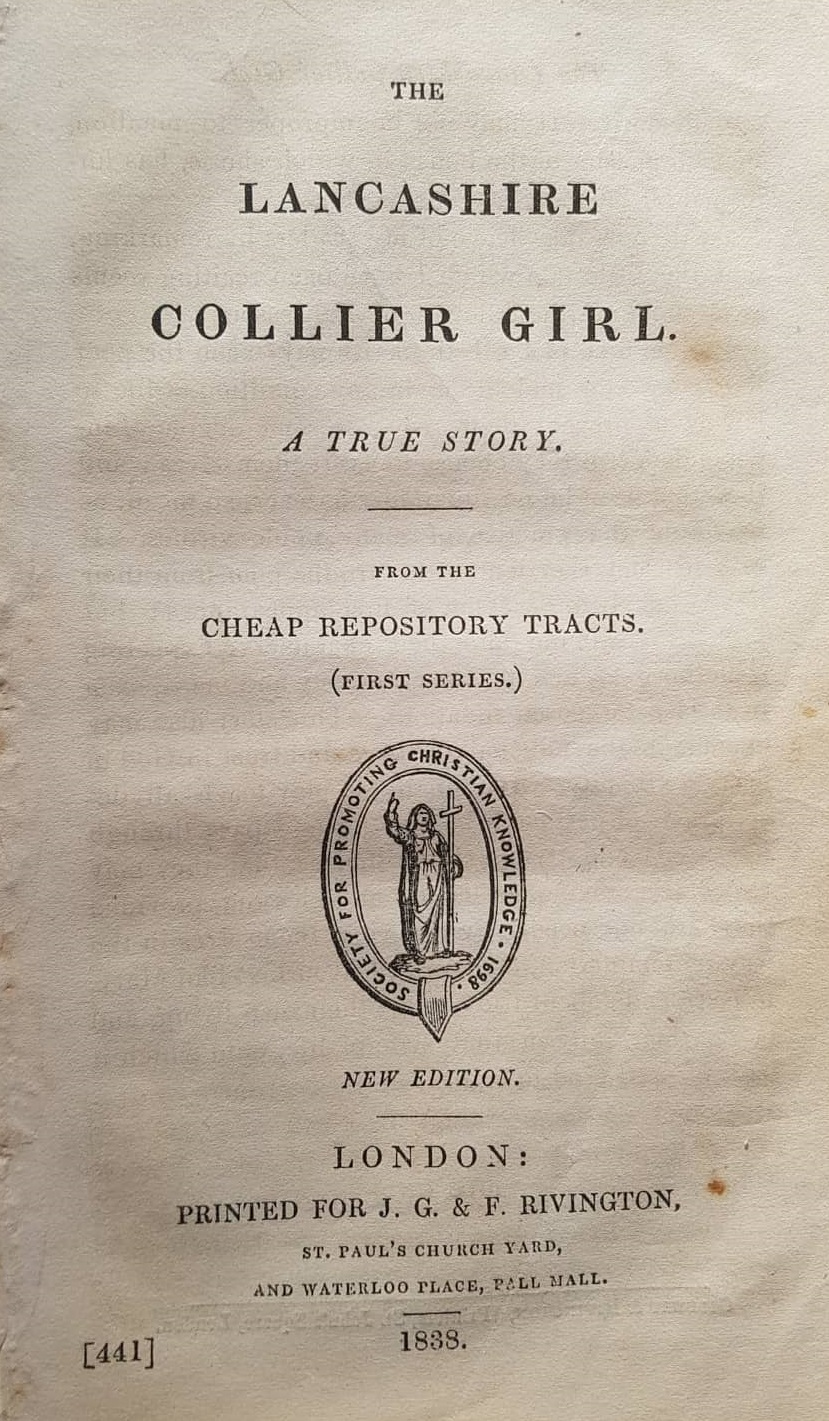
The Lancashire Collier Girl, 1838 edition

In addition to the continuing demand for reprints of individual tracts, there was also a demand for collected editions, aimed at a middle-class audience. In the Spring of 1798 the committee under Henry Thornton sold the copyrights of all the existing titles to Francis and Charles Rivington, printers to the S.P.C.K. This firm published a collected edition of official tracts in three volumes, (also printed by Evans), in the same year. This edition was reprinted in 1799 and 1800, and then at regular intervals until 1830. More later regretted having 'given half the profits' to Rivington. Between 1829 and 1851 the firm published, two series of the existing titles with the imprints J.G. & F. and J.G.F. & J. Rivington on behalf of the Society for Promoting Christian Knowledge. These were printed by R. Gilbert (latterly Gilbert & Rivington), as both individual tracts and in collected editions. Twenty-nine titles are listed on the Copac and WorldCat databases.

=== Series published in the US (1799-1803) ===
Individual tract titles were imported to the US soon after their publication in England. From 1797 a few US editions also began to be published in Philadelphia by B. Johnson. Then in 1799 about sixty of the tracts (together with a few other non-Cheap-Repository titles) appeared in two collected volumes of the tracts were published in New York by Cornelius Davis. Then during the course of 1800 a further forty-two of the titles were published in Philadelphia by B. & J. Johnson in a numbered Cheap Repository series. Further American collected editions were published by E. Lincoln of Boston in 1802 and 1803.

=== The Cheap Repository in Scotland ===
A similar monthly series of twenty-nine ‘’Scotch Cheap Repository Tracts; containing Moral Tales for the Instruction of the Young,’’ were produced by ‘a Society of Clergymen in Dumfries-Shire’. They were modelled on Hannah More's tracts but sought, ‘to adapt this captivating mode of instruction to the religious sentiments, as well as to the manner and habits, of the intelligent peasantry in the division of the United Kingdom’. The first of the Scots tracts was The History of Maitland Smith, published in 1807 to raise funds to support the family of the executed criminal in the title. Other titles included The Happy daughter, or the history of Jean Morton. by Elizabeth Hamilton (writer). A 2nd collected edition ‘corrected and greatly enlarged’ was published in Edinburgh in 1815.

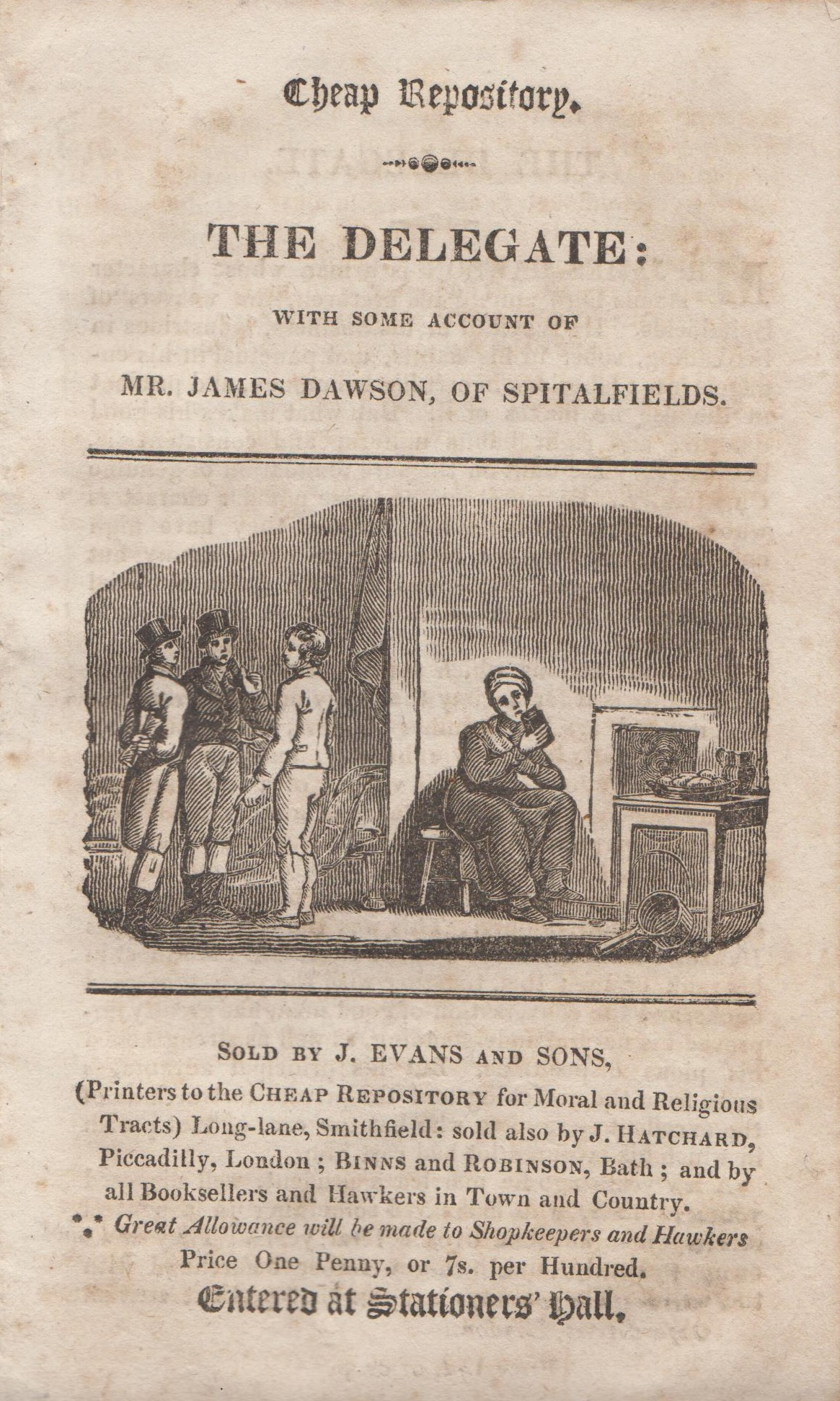
One of Hannah More's 'Spa Fields' Tracts from 1817

=== 'Spa Fields' tracts (1817) ===
The period immediately following the Napoleonic Wars saw popular dissatisfaction in England culminating in the Spa Fields riots of December 1816 and an abortive attempt to take control of the government. Hannah More therefore issued a number of entirely new, pro-establishment, titles during 1817 including The loyal subjects political creed; The Delegate; The Private Virtues of public Reformists; and Fair words and foul meaning. She also amended several of the earlier tracts to give them a stronger political message. These were later republished in a collected edition, together with some of the more political earlier titles, entitled Cheap Repository Tracts, suited to the present times, in 1819.

== Impact ==
The publication of the Cheap Repository Tracts has been represented by some political historians as a conservative reaction to the success enjoyed by Thomas Paine's The Rights of Man and Age of Reason. However, this may be an oversimplification of Hannah More's motives. Only a small proportion of the 1790s tracts were political in content; the majority attempted to reform the morals of the working classes, "adopting the forms, writing styles, and even distribution channels of popular literature".

They were an undoubted publishing phenomenon and according to Richard Altick: "there had never been anything like it in the history of English books." Some of the titles, such as The shepherd of Salisbury plain were later translated into French, German and Russian. This title was also satirized by William Thackeray in Vanity Fair who talks of Lady Emily Hornblower and her tracts including The washerwoman of Finchley Common. Yet the extent of the impact that they may have had on the lives of the working classes, at whom they were aimed, has also been questioned. They may have been: "a huge hit among the middle classes, who …had set up 'very respectable Societies' throughout the country, in order to distribute them."

== See also ==
- List of Cheap Repository Tracts

== Resources ==
- Altick, Richard D. ‘’The English common reader’’ University of Chicago Press, 1957,
- ‘’Cheap Repository for Moral and Religious Publications’’, [a prospectus] : London: J. Marshall, [1795?]. ESTC T030543.
- Cheap repository shorter tracts, (F. and C. Rivington, 1798), ESTC T030544.
- Fawcett, Trevor. Georgian imprints: printing and publishing at Bath 1729-1815, Bath: Ruton, 2008.
- Jones, Mary G. ‘’Hannah More’’, (Cambridge University Press, 1952)
- Kelly, Gary. "Revolution, Reaction, and the Expropriation of Popular Culture: Hannah More's Cheap Repository." Man and Nature 6 (1987): 147–59.
- Myers, Mitzi. "Hannah More's Tracts for the Times: Social Fiction and Female Ideology." Fetter'd or Free? British Women Novelists, 1670-1815. Eds. Mary Anne Schofield and Cecilia Macheski. Athens: Ohio University Press, 1986.
- Pedersen, Susan, ‘Hannah More Meets Simple Simon: Tracts, Chapbooks, and Popular Culture in Late Eighteenth-Century England,’ The Journal of British Studies, Vol. 25, No. 1 (Jan., 1986), pp. 84–113.
- Scheuerman, Mona. In Praise of Poverty: Hannah More Counters Thomas Paine and the Radical Threat. Lexington: University Press of Kentucky, 2002.
- Society of Clergymen in Dumfries-Shire, ‘Scotch Cheap Repository Tracts; containing Moral Tales for the Instruction of the Young,’ Edinburgh: Oliphant Waugh and Innes, 1815.
- Spinney, G. H. 'Cheap Repository Tracts; Hazard and Marshall edition,' The Library, Vol. 20, 4th Series, (1939–40), pp. 295–340.
- Stoker, David, ‘John Marshall, John Evans and the Cheap Repository Tracts,’ ‘’Papers of the Bibliographical Society of America,’’ Vol. 107:1 (2013), pp.81-118.
- Stoker, David, 'An Unrecorded Cheap Repository Tract: The Rebellion of Korah, Dathan, and Abiram, A Monument of Fame: The Lambeth Palace Library Blog, August 2015, https://lambethpalacelibrary.wordpress.com/2015/08/14/an-unrecorded-cheap-repository-tract-the-rebellion-of-korah-dathan-and-abiram/
- Stoker, David, ‘The later years of the Cheap Repository,’ Papers of the Bibliographical Society of America Vol. 111:3 (2017), pp. 317–44.
- Stoker, David, ‘The Watson family, the Association for the Discountenancing of Vice, and the Irish Cheap Repository Tracts,’ The Library, Transaction of the Bibliographical Society, 7th series Vol. 21:3 (2020), pp. 343–384.
- Stott, Anne, Hannah More. The First Victorian (Oxford: O.U.P., 2003).
- Weiss, Harry B. ‘Hannah More's Cheap Repository Tracts in America,’ Bulletin of the New York Public Library 50.7 (1946), and 50.8 (1946).
