= List of Cheap Repository Tracts =

The Cheap Repository Tracts were a series of moral, religious and political tracts first published between 1795 and 1817. Only British first editions are listed here except where a new edition contains an amended text or a new title (in which case the amended titles are given a new entry).

The entries are grouped according to the series in which they were first issued, and then in the order given by Spinney (1939). The numbers in the first column are those allocated by Spinney (1–187) and running numbers thereafter. They do not necessarily reflect the order in which they were published.

== "First-day tracts" (March–June 1795) ==
No.	Author (where known)	Title
1	"Z." (Hannah More)	The apprentice's monitor; or, indentures in verse shewing what they are bound to do.
2		Babay: A true story of a good negro woman.
3		Book of martyrs: An account of holy men who died for the Christian religion.
4	"Z." (Hannah More)	The carpenter; or, the danger of evil company.
5		The cock-fighter: A true history.
6	Isaac Watts	Divine songs attempted in easy language for the use of children.
7		Execution of Maclean, commonly known by the name of The Gentleman Highwayman.
8	"Z." (Hannah More)	The gin-shop; or, a peep into a prison.
9	Daniel Defoe	History of the plague in London in 1665; with suitable reflections.
10	"Z." (Hannah More)	The history of Tom White, the postillion.
11		The horse race; or, the pleasures of the course.
12		Husbandry moraliz'd; or pleasant Sunday reading for a farmer's kitchen. Part I.
13	William Gilpin	Life of William Baker, with his funeral sermon, by the Rev. Mr. Gilpin.
14	"Z." (Hannah More)	The market woman, a true tale; or, honesty is the best policy.
15	Henry Fielding	Murders: True examples of the interposition of providence, in the discovery and punishment of murder.
16		A new history of a true book in verse.
17		The old man, his children, and the bundle of sticks.
18	"Z." (Hannah More)	The roguish miller; or, nothing got by cheating.
19	"Z." (Hannah More)	The shepherd of Salisbury-Plain (part 1).
20	"Z." (Hannah More)	The two shoemakers.
21	"S" Sarah More	The two soldiers.
22	John Nicholson Inglefield	Wonderful escape from shipwreck.

== Hazard/Marshall series (July 1795 – February 1796) ==
No.	Author (where known)	Title
23	"Z." (Hannah More)	The Lancashire collier girl: A true story.
24	Henry Thornton	On the religious advantages of the present inhabitants of Great Britain.
25	Henry Thornton	The beggarly boy.
26		The execution of wild Robert. Being a warning to all parents.
27	"Z." (Hannah More)	The shepherd of Salisbury plain. Part II.
28		Daniel in the den of lions.
29	"S" Sarah More	The good mother' s legacy.
30	"Z." (Hannah More)	Patient Joe; or, the Newcastle Collier.
31	"Z." (Hannah More)	The happy waterman.
32		Hints to all ranks of people on the occasion of the present scarcity.
33	William Mason	The plow-boy's dream.
34	"Z." (Hannah More)	The riot; or, half a loaf is better than no bread.
35	"Z." (Hannah More)	Dame Andrews, a ballad.
36		Noah's flood.
37	"Z." (Hannah More)	The way to plenty; or, the second part of Tom White.
38		The harvest home.
39	"Z." (Hannah More)	The honest miller of Glocestershire: A true ballad.
40	"Z." (Hannah More)	The two wealthy farmers; or, the History of Mr. Bragwell. Part I.
41		The parable of the laborers in the vineyard.
42	Eaglesfield Smith	The sorrows of Yamba; or the negro woman's lamentation.
43	"Z." (Hannah More)	The two wealthy farmers; or, the history of Mr. Bragwell. Part II.
44		A new Christmas carol called the merry Christmas and happy New Year.
45	"S" Sarah More	Sorrowful Sam; or, the two blacksmiths.
46		The troubles of life; or, the guinea and the shilling.
47	"Z." (Hannah More)	The history of Mary Wood the house-maid; or, the Danger of false excuses.
48	"Z." (Hannah More)	Robert and Richard; or, the ghost of poor Molly, who was drowned in Richard's mill pond.
49		Some new thoughts for the New Year.
49*. (Note: According to Spinney this title was printed but withdrawn)		The middle way's the best.

== John Marshall "official" series (March 1796 – November 1797) ==
No.	Author (where known)	Title
50	"Z." (Hannah More)	The Apprentice turned Master; or, the second part of the two shoemakers. Shewing how James Stock from a parish apprentice became a creditable tradesman.
51		The Story of Sinful Sally:Told by herself 'Shewing how from being Sally of the Green she was first led to become Sinful Sally, and afterwards Drunken Sal, and how at last she came to a most melancholy and almost hopeless end; being therein a warning to all young women both in town and country.
52		The touchstone; or, the way to know a true Christian. Being a description of the character of our blessed Saviour, with an inquiry whether we are like him. To which is added, an appeal first to Infidels, and then to persons who call themselves by the name of Christians.
53	"Z." (Hannah More)	The history of idle Jack Brown. Containing the merry story of the Mountebank, with some account of the bay mare Smiler. Being the third part of the two shoemakers.
54		Onesimus; or, The run-away servant converted A true story. Shewing what a wonderful improvement in his condition Onesimus experienced after he became a Christian. To which is added an affectionate address to all those unhappy persons, both men and women, who, like Onesmius, have left their home and have got into any bad way of living, and who have also a mind to hear how they may get out.
55	"Z." (Hannah More)	The shopkeeper turned sailor; or, the Folly of going out of our element. Shewing what a clever man John the Shopkeeper was in his own business, and what a rash step he took in resolving to go upon the water. Part I.
56		The conversion of St. Paul the Apostle.
57	"Z." (Hannah More)	Jack Brown in prison; or, the pitcher never goes so often to the well but it is broke at last. Being the fourth part of The history of the two shoemakers.
58	"Z." (Hannah More)	John the shopkeeper turned sailor Part II; or, the folly of going out of our element. In which a particular Account is given of the several Branches of this worthy Family.
59		The general resurrection. Part I. Being a description, taken from scripture, of some of the Events which will come to pass at the end of the world.
60	"Z." (Hannah More)	The Hackney coachman; or, the way to get a good fare. To the Tune of "I wish I was a Fisherman," &c.
61		The history of Charles Jones, the footman. Written by himself.
62	"S" Sarah More	The Cheapside apprentice; or, the history of Mr. Francis H****. Fully setting forth the danger of playing with edge tools. Shewing also, how a gay life may prove a short one; and that a merry evening may produce a sorrowful Morning.
63		The election. A quite new song. Shewing many things which are now doing, and which ought not to be done. being a song very fit to be sung in all places where an election is going on. To the tune of-Dusky Night.
64	"Z." (Hannah More)	On carrying religion into the common business of life. A Dialogue between James Stock and Will Simpson, the Shoemakers, as they sat at Work.
65		The Gamester. The story of poor Tricket the gamester, showing how he first lost his place by gaming, and then had well nigh been the death of his wife through the same cause, and how, lastly, his gaming was the occasion of his being transported as a convict to Botany Bay.
66		Look at home; or, the accusers accused. Being an account of the manner in which our Savior put to silence the Scribes and Pharisees, when they brought to him the woman taken in adultery.
67	"Z." (Hannah More)	Turn the carpet; or, the two weavers : a new song, in a dialogue between Dick and John.
68	"Z." (Hannah More)	Betty Brown, the St. Giles's orange girl. With some account of Mrs. Sponge, the money-lender.
69	"Z." (Hannah More)	The grand assizes; or General goal delivery.
70	"Z." (Hannah More)	John the shopkeeper turned sailor; Part III. Shewing how John and his family actually took boat, and how they had for a while a most delightful sail on the wide ocean.
71		Explanation of the nature of baptism. Designed especially for all those Parents, who are about to bring a Child to be baptized.
72	"Z." (Hannah More)	The history of Mr. Bragwell; or, the two wealthy farmers. Part III.
73	"Z." (Hannah More)	A hymn of praise for the abundant harvest of 1796.
74	"Z." (Hannah More)	The history of the two wealthy farmers; or, a new dialogue, between Mr. Bragwell and Mr. Worthy. Part IV.
75		King Dionysius and Squire Damocles; a new song on an old story. Proper to be sung at all feasts and merry-makings.
76	"Z." (Hannah More)	The two wealthy farmers, with the sad adventures of Miss Bragwell. Part V.
77	"Z." (Hannah More)	Black Giles the poacher: With some account of a family who had rather live by their wits than their work. Part I.
78		The Hampshire tragedy: Shewing how a servant maid first robbed her master, and was afterwards struck dead for telling a lie. A true story.
79	Henry Thornton	Prayers: To be used by a child or young person – by a grown person – by the master or mistress of a Sunday school – and by the master or mistress of a family.
80	"Z." (Hannah More)	Bear ye one another's burthens; or, the valley of tears: a vision.
81	"Z." (Hannah More)	Black Giles the poacher. Part II. With the history of Widow Brown's apple-tree.
82		A new Christmas carol for 1796.
83	"Z." (Hannah More)	The bad bargain; or, the world set up to sale.
84	"Z." (Hannah More)	The cottage cook; or, Mrs. Jones's cheap dishes; Shewing the way to do much good with little money.
85		On the sacrament of the Lord's supper.
86	"Z." (Hannah More)	The good militia man; or, the man that is worth a host: Being a new song, by honest Dan, the plough-boy turned soldier.
87		The story of Joseph and his brethren. Part I.
88		The wonderful advantages of adventuring in the lottery!!!.
89		Dick and Johnny; or, The last new drinking song.
90	"S" Sarah More	The hubbub; or, the history of farmer Russel the hard-hearted overseer.
91		Joseph in prison. The story of Joseph and his brethren. Part II.
92		Joseph delivered out of prison. The story of Joseph and his brethren. Part III.
93	"Z." (Hannah More)	Tawny Rachel; or, the fortune teller. With some account of dreams, omens and conjurers.
94		The true heroes; or, the noble Army of martyrs.
95		Joseph and his brethren. Part IV.
96	"Z." (Hannah More)	The Sunday school.
97	"Z." (Hannah More)	The two gardeners.
98	"Z." (Hannah More)	The day of judgment; or, the grand reckoning.
99	"Z." (Hannah More)	The history of Hester Wilmot; or the second part of the Sunday School.
100	"Z." (Hannah More)	The servant man turned soldier; or, the fair weather Christian. A parable.
101	"Z." (Hannah More)	The history of Hester Wilmot; or the New gown. Part II. Being a continuation of the Sunday School.
102	"Z." (Hannah More)	The lady and the pye; or know thyself.
103	"Z." (Hannah More)	The strait gate and the broad way,.
104		The explanation of the Ten Commandments. Part I.
105	"Z." (Hannah More)	The history of Mr. Fantom, the new fashioned philosopher and his man William.
106		The loyal sailor;; or, No mutineering.
107	"S" Sarah More	The history of diligent Dick; or, truth will out though it be hid in a well.
108	"Z." (Hannah More)	The pilgrims. An allegory.
109	"Z." (Hannah More)	Dan and Jane; or faith and works. 'A tale'.
110		The explanation of the Ten Commandments. Part II.
111	"Z." (Hannah More)	The two wealthy farmers; or the Sixth part of the history of Mr. Bragwell and his two daughters.
112		The explanation of the Ten Commandments. Part III.
113	"Z." (Hannah More)	The two wealthy farmers; or, the seventh and last part of the history of Mr. Bragwell and his two daughters.
114	"Z." (Hannah More)	The plum-cakes; or, the Farmer and his three sons.

== John Marshall "unofficial" series (January 1798 – December 1799) ==
No.	Author (where known)	Title
115		Delays are dangerous; or, The return of John Atkins.
116		Richard and Rebecca; or, A receipt for domestic happiness.
117		The widow of Zarephath.
118		The affectionate orphans.
119		Ananias and Sapphira.
120		The good aunt.
121		The history of Samson.
122		The wanderer. A fable.
123		The wreck.
124		The fatal choice.
125		The history of St. Peter the apostle.
126		The wife reformed.
127		Betty Gillis; or, honesty rewarded.
128		Easter Monday.
129	"S.S." (Mary Ann Kilner)	The sower. A parable.
130		Jeremiah Wilkins; or, the error repaired.
131		The mistaken evil. A true story.
132		Friendly advice. In a letter from Mrs. Heartwhole, to Dame Nicholls, at High Wood alms-houses, on her fears of the French invasion.
133*		The distressed mother.
134		Eli the high priest.
135		The murder in the wood.
136		David, the chosen of God.
137		Elisha; or, the only two ways of subduing our enemies, either by kindness or the sword.
138		The good step-mother.
139		The history of John the Baptist.
140		Never fly from your duty; or, the history of James Brown and John Simpson.
141	"S.S." (Mary Ann Kilner)	Satan's device; or, the devil no changeling. Being the history of Jack Flint the soldier'. In four parts. Part I.
142		Madge Blarney, the gipsey girl.
143		Prophesies relating to Jesus Christ.
144	"S.S." (Mary Ann Kilner)	Satan's device; or, the devil no changeling. Part II.
145		Sacred biography. Part I. Adam a type of Christ.
146	"S.S." (Mary Ann Kilner)	Satan's device; or, the devil no changeling. Part III.
147		The two cousins; or, spare the rod and spoil the child.
148		The honest publican, or; the power of perseverance in a good cause.
149		Reflections on our late glorious victory at the mouth of the Nile.
150	"S.S." (Mary Ann Kilner)	Satan's device; or, the devil no changeling. Part IV.
151		The parish nurse.
152		Sacred biography. Part II. Abel a type of Christ.
153		True happiness.
155	"W."	Domestic contrasts; or, the different fortunes of Nancy and Lucy. Part I.
156	"S.S." (Mary Ann Kilner)	New-Year's-Day; or, gratitude for blessings received.
157		Virtue triumphant; or, the history of Queen Esther.
158	"W."	Domestic contrasts; or, The different fortunes of Nancy and Lucy. Part II.
159		Sacred biography. Part III. Enoch a type of Christ.
160	"F."	The sorrows of Hannah: a ballad (to the tune of the Lamentation of Mary, Queen of Scots) addressed to her husband, then under sentence of transportation for a first act of dishonesty, to which he had been tempted by extreme indigence.
161		Cicely; or, the power of honesty.
162	"W."	Domestic Contrasts; or, the different fortunes of Nancy and Lucy. Part III.
163		The good parish priest; or, the drunken carpenter reclaimed.
164	"A.R."	The humble reformer; or, neighbourly chat.
165		The judgment awaiting undutiful children. Illustrated in the history of Absalom.
166	"S.S." (Mary Ann Kilner)	The miraculous supply; or, the widow sustained in the time of famine.
167		A dream.
168		The parable of the ten talents.
169	"W."	Sweep, soot o! or, some account of little Jem, the chimney sweeper and his benefactress.
170	"S.S." (Mary Ann Kilner)	The happiness of Britain.
171	"L."	The history of Fanny Mills; or, no one too young to do good. Part I.
172	"W."	The Shropshire rector; or, rational devotion.
173	"W."	Cottage prayers. Being intended as a second part to the Shropshire Rector.
174	"L."	The history of Fanny Mills; or, no one too young to do good. Part II.
175	"S.S." (Mary Ann Kilner)	The patient father; or, the young sailor's return.
176	"S.S." (Mary Ann Kilner)	The bean-feast.
177		The deceitfulness of pleasure; or, some account of my lady Blithe.
178	"A.R."	The divine model; or, the Christian's exemplar.
179	"M."	The baker's dream; or, death no bad change to the poor and good.
180	"A.R."	The History of Jonathan Griffin and William Peterson. Pointing out an asylum to the destitute.
181		Old Tom Parr. A true story. Shewing, That he was a labouring Man, and the Wonder of his Time; and how he was brought up to London by the Earl of Arundel, 1635, in which Year he died, aged 152, according to some Historians, others say in his hundred and sixtieth Year; but all agree that he had lived during the Reign of ten different Sovereigns.
182	"S.S." (Mary Ann Kilner)	The contented cobbler.
183		Noah.
184		The Saturday school.
185	"A.R."	An address to the aged poor.
186		The history of Jenny Froth and Polly Goodchild; or pride and humility. Being the second part of the Saturday School.
187		Richard's address to his Lucy on the first return of their wedding-day.

== John Evans printed editions (December 1797 – October 1798) ==
No.	Author (where known)	Title
188		The Fall of Adam, Our First Parent: with some account of the creation of the world: shewing the happy state of man in paradise; and also the sin and misery which have entered since the fall. To which are added, some remarks respecting our Lord Jesus Christ, who is the second Adam, and the only saviour of this world.
189		A New Christmas Tract, or the Right Way of Rejoicing at Christmas. Shewing the reasons we have for joy at the event of our Saviour's birth. In which also a description is given of the dreadful state the World was in before his coming; with some remarks suited to the times in which we live.
190	"Z." (Hannah More)	A New Christmas Hymn.
191	"Z." (Hannah More)	Here and there; or, this world and the next. Being suitable thoughts for the new year.
192	"Z." (Hannah More)	Parley the Porter, An allegory. Shewing how robbers without can never get into an house unless there are traitors within.
193	"Z." (Hannah More)	Thanksgiving day. An address to all persons, especially to our brave sailors, suited to the Thanksgiving day; in which address an account is given of our three great victories obtained, through the blessing of God, over the French, the Spaniards, and the Dutch, by Admiral Lord Howe, Admiral Sir John Jervis, ... and Admiral Duncan, ... To which is added, an account of the procession to St. Paul's.
194		The Black Prince: a true story; being an Account of the life and death of Naimbanna, an African King's son, who arrived in England in the Year 1791, and set sail on his return in June, 1793.
195	"Z." (Hannah More)	The Death of Christ; or, Tract for Good Friday.
196		The Gravestone; Being an account (supposed to be written on a gravestone,) of a wife who buried both her children on one day, and who, from that time, became a very devout Christian. With a suitable address to those who may be attending a funeral.
197		The Judgment Day; in which a true and just account is given of the manner in which the scriptures teach that we, and all mankind, are to be tried on the great day of judgment.
198		The Rebellion of Korah, Dathan, and Abiram. Shewing the dreadful end of them and their party. Being a story calculated to instruct all persons belonging to the societies of United Englishmen, or United Irishmen; and earnestly recommended to such as may be invited to join them.
199	"Z." (Hannah More)	The Shopkeeper turned Sailor, Part IV.
200		The Thunderstorm; or, the History of Tom Watson, the Unnatural Son. Being a Warning to All Children.
201	"Z." (Hannah More)	The two shoemakers Part VI. Dialogue the second. On the duty of carrying religion into our amusements.
202	"Z." (Hannah More)	'Tis all for the best.

== "Spa Fields tracts", 1817 ==
No.	Author (where known)	Title
203	"Z." (Hannah More)	An Address to the meeting at Spa Fields.
204	"Z." (Hannah More)	Look before you leap.
205	"Z." (Hannah More)	Fair words and foul meanings.
206	"Z." (Hannah More)	The Market-house orator; or, the loyal weavers.
207	"Z." (Hannah More)	The True Rights of Men; or, the Contented Spital-fields' Weaver.
208	"Z." (Hannah More)	The loyal subject's political creed; or, what I do, and what I do not think.
209	"Z." (Hannah More)	The ploughman's ditty.
210	"Z." (Hannah More)	The carpenter; or, the danger of evil company. (Note: A revised version of the text issued in 1795.)
211	"Z." (Hannah More)	Turn the carpet; or, both sides of the question. (Note: A revised version of the text issued in 1796.)
212	"Z." (Hannah More)	The riot; or, half a loaf is better than no bread. In a Dialogue between Jack Anvil and Tom Hod. – To the tune of "A cobbler there was, &c." (Note: A revised version of the text issued in 1795.)
213	"Z." (Hannah More)	The Hackney coachman, or, the way to get a good fare. To the Tune of "I wish I was a fisherman," (Note: A revised version of the text issued in 1795.)
214	"Z." (Hannah More)	The fortunate farthing, A sew song.
215	William Waldegrave	Admiral Lord Radstock's Cheap Receipts for the Poor.
216	"Z." (Hannah More)	Private Virtues of Public Reformists; or, a continuation of the history of Mr. Fantom.
217	"Z." (Hannah More)	The death of Mr. Fantom; or, a continuation of the history of Mr. Fantom.
218	"Z." (Hannah More)	The delegate; With some account of Mr. James Dawson, of Spitalfields.
219	"Z." (Hannah More)	The valley of tears; or bear ye one another's burthens. A vision. (Note: An extended version of "Bear ye one another's burthens" first issued in 1797.)
220	"Z." (Hannah More)	The village disputants. (Note: Only the 14th–16th editions of this title were issued as Cheap Repository Tracts.)

== Sources ==
- Spinney, G. H. (1938). "Cheap Repository Tracts: Hazard and Marshall Edition". The Library. 4th series, Vol.20 (3). London: The Bibliographical Society: 295–340.
- Stoker, David (2017). "The later years of the Cheap Repository". Papers of the Bibliographical Society of America. 111 (3). New York: Bibliographical Society of America: 317–344. ISSN 0006-128X.
