= Elizabeth Helme =

English writer (1743–1814)

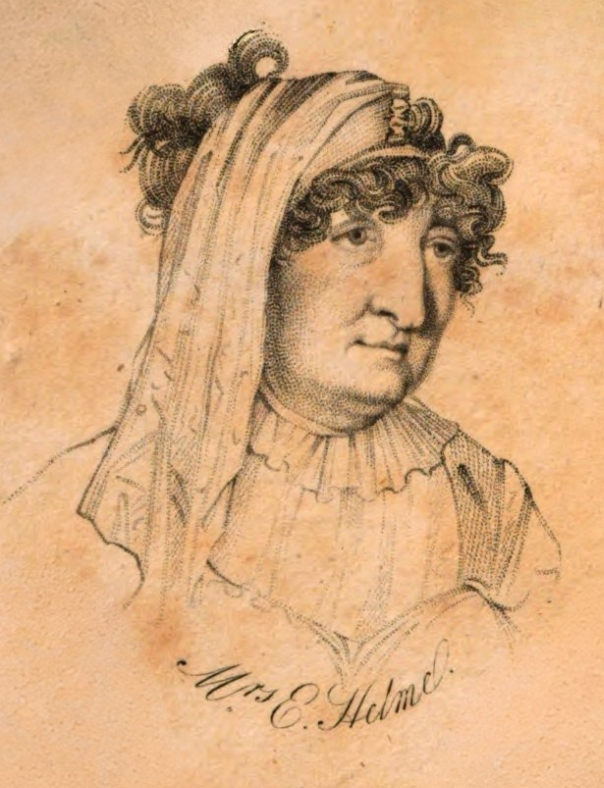
Portrait of Elizabeth Helme

Elizabeth Helme (née Horrobin; 8 August 1743 – 1 January 1814) was a prolific English novelist, educational writer, and translator active in the late 18th and early 19th centuries.

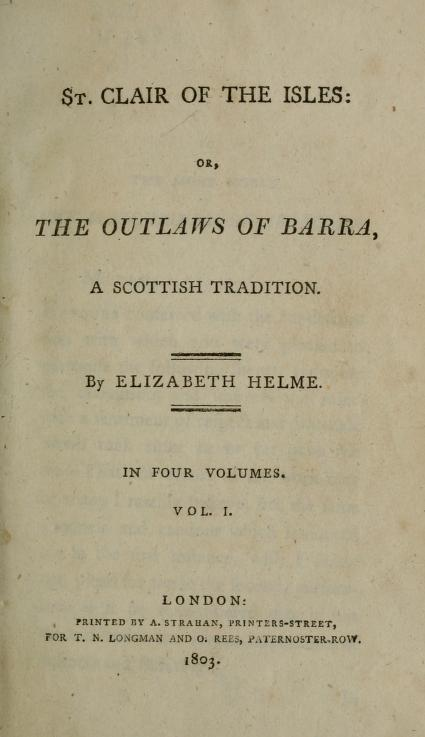
Title page of Elizabeth Helme's St. Clair of the Isles: or, The outlaws of Barra, a Scottish tradition Vol I (London: T.N. Longman and O. Rees, 1803) (Internet Archive)

== Life ==
Elizabeth Helme was likely born in County Durham, England, to a family tentatively identified by the name of Horrobin. Her family moved to London, where she met William Helme (c.1747–1822), who became her husband in 1772. They had five children. One of their daughters, Elizabeth Somerville (1774–1840), herself became a novelist. Elizabeth Helme is also known to have worked as a teacher, and her translations included two children's plays by Joachim Heinrich Campe: Cortez (1799) and Pizarro (1800), and much of her writing was aimed for younger readers.

== Writing ==
Helme published her first, anonymous novel, Louisa; or, The Cottage on the Moor in 1787, and it remained one of her most successful publications Her work first appeared under her own name with The Farmer of Inglewood Forest, published by the popular Minerva Press in 1796.

Despite both she and her husband working as headmistress and schoolmaster, respectively, at Brentford, and her considerable literary output, the family suffered continual financial difficulties and the Royal Literary Society retain records of various applications for assistance, including one from novelist Lucy Peacock to help with Helme's burial in 1814.

In 1838, Elizabeth Polack based her play St. Clair on Helme's novel St Clair of the Isles.

She is one of the "lost" women writers listed by Dale Spender in Mothers of the Novel: 100 Good Women Writers Before Jane Austen.

== Works ==
=== Novels ===
- Louisa; or the Cottage on the Moor (London: George Kearsley, 1787)
- Clara and Emmeline: or, the Maternal Benediction (London: George Kearsley, 1788)
- Duncan and Peggy; a Scottish Tale (London: Joseph Bell, 1794)
- The Farmer of Inglewood Forest (London: Minerva Press, 1796)
- Albert, or The Wilds of Strathnavern (London: Sampson Low, 1799)
- St Margaret's Cave: or, The Nun's Story. An Ancient Legend (London: Earle and Hemet, 1801)
- St Clair of the Isles (London: Thomas Norton Longman And Owen Rees, 1803)
- The Pilgrim of the Cross, or Chronicles of Christabelle de Mowbray (London: Philip Norbury, 1805)
- Magdalen, or The Penitent of Godstow (London: Philip Norbury, 1812)
- Modern Times; or, The Age We Live In (London: Philip Norbury, 1814) (published posthumously)

=== Non-fiction works ===
- Instructive rambles in London, and the adjacent villages. Designed to amuse the mind, and improve the understanding of youth. (London: Elizabeth Newbery, 1798)
- Instructive Rambles Extended (London: Sampson Low, 1800)
- The History of Scotland: Related in Familiar Conversations, by a Father to His Children (London: Philip Norbury, 1806)
- The History of England, Related in Familiar Conversations, by a Father to His Children (London: Longman, Hurst, Rees, and Orme / J. Harris; 1806)
- Maternal Instruction or Family Conversations on Moral and Entertaining Subjects (London: Longman, Hurst, Rees, and Orme, 1807)
- The History of Rome from the Foundation of the City to the Fall of the Eastern Empire(London: Philip Norbury, 1808)
- The Fruits of Reflection; or, Moral Remembrances on Various Subjects. Designed for the perusal of youth (London: Philip Norbury / Lucy Peacock, 1809)

=== Translations ===
- Travels from the Cape of Good-Hope, into the Interior Parts of Africa (French original by Francois Le Vaillant) (London: William Lane, 1790)
- St. Alma, a novel (French original by Jean Claude Gorjy) (London: William Lane, 1791)
- Cortez: or, The Conquest of Mexico, as related by a father to his children (German original by Joachim Heinrich Campe) (London: Sampson Low, 1799)
- Pizarro; or, the conquest of Peru, as related by a father to his children (German original by Joachim Heinrich Campe) (London: Sampson Low, 1799)
- Columbus; or, The discovery of America, as related by a father to his children (German original by Joachim Heinrich Campe) (London: Sampson Low, 1811)

== Resources ==
- Blain, Virginia, et al., eds. The Feminist Companion to Literature in English. London, 1990. 509–10. Print.
- Font Paz, Carme. 'Owing the Comforts of Life to Art’: Elizabeth Helme’s Critical Reception and the Practice of Writing. ENTHYMEMA: International Journal of Literary Criticism, Literary Theory, and Philosophy of Literature, Vol. 31, pp. 101–113. https://doi.org/10.54103/2037-2426/19003
- "Helme, Elizabeth." British Travel Writing (University of Wolverhampton)
- "Helme, Elizabeth." Orlando: Women’s Writing in the British Isles from the Beginnings to the Present. Retrieved 9 July 2022. (Orlando)
- "Helme, Elizabeth." The Women's Print History Project, 2019, Person ID 197. Retrieved 9 July 2022. (WPHP)
