= Elizabeth Somerville =

Scottish novelist

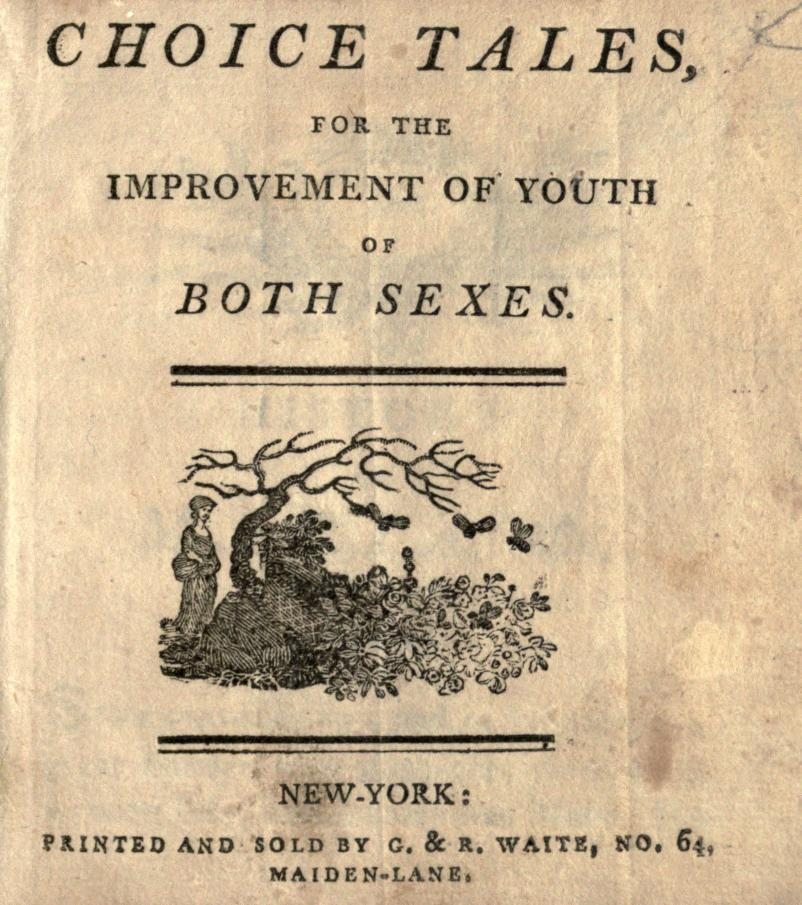
- Title page of Elizabeth Somerville's Choice tales, for the improvement of youth of both sexes (U.S. edition: New-York: G. & R. Waite [ca. 1803])
- Born: Helme; 1774; Lanarkshire, Scotland
- Died: 1840 (aged 65–66)
- Occupation: Writer
- Relatives: Elizabeth Helme (mother)
- Writing career
- Language: English
- Subjects: Children's literature; conduct literature

Elizabeth Somerville (née Helme; 1774–1840) was a Scottish novelist who wrote primarily for children. She was also a school mistress.

== Life ==
Elizabeth Helme was born in Lanarkshire, Scotland, one of the five children of Elizabeth and William Helme. Her mother, Elizabeth, was a school teacher and translator, and her father was a schoolmaster. Despite these employments, the family frequently struggled financially.

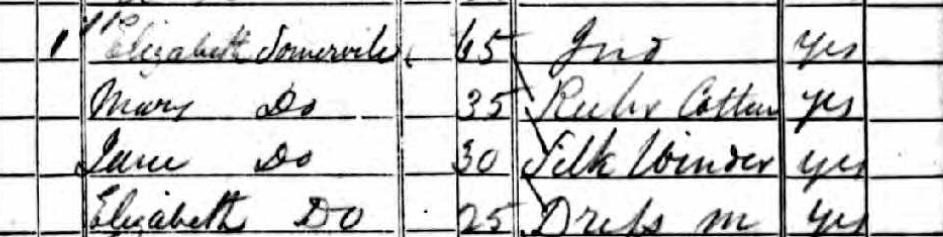
Somerville found in the 1841 British census, along with a Mary Somerville, Jane Somerville, and Elizabeth Somerville.

In her later life, Somerville moved to Lancashire and lived in District Nine of that county.

There is evidence that she and her family continued to suffer from economic precarity. According to an 1841 census, she made her living by "independent means," which could refer to free-lance writing.

== Writing ==
Somerville began publishing in 1799 and initially published her works as "Elizabeth Helme" or "Elizabeth Helme, Junior." Unsurprisingly, some of her works have been on occasion mis-attributed to her mother. After 1801 she used her married name and published as "Mrs. Somerville."

=== Works ===
The following is a list of published works authored by Somerville, though there still remain some issues with attribution.

- The faithful mirror (1799)
- James Manners, Little John, and their dog Bluff. By Elizabeth Helme, Jun. (London: Darton & Harvey / E. Newbery, 1799)
- Flora: or the deserted child. By Elizabeth Somerville. (London: Longman and Rees, 1800)
- Lessons for children of three years old (London: Benjamin Crosby and Co. / B. Tabart, 1800)
- Lessons, or, Short stories in two and three syllables, containing ... By Elizabeth Somerville. (London: Benjamin Crosby and Co. / B. Tabart, 1800)
- The village maid, or, Dame Burton's moral stories for the instruction and amusement of youth. By Elizabeth Somerville. (London: Vernor and Hood, Poultry, 1801)
- The birth-day, or, Moral dialogues and stories for the instruction and amusement of juvenile readers (1802)
- Mabel Woodbine and her sister Lydia: a tale interspersed with moral and original stories. By Elizabeth Somerville. (London: B. Crosby and Co., 1802)
- The new children in the wood, or, The Welch cottagers: a tale. By Elizabeth Somerville. (London: B. Crosby and Co., 1802)
- Choice tales, for the improvement of youth of both sexes (1803)
- Preludes to Knowledge, Or, Amusing and Instructive Conversations on History, Astronomy, Geography, Optics, and the Division of Time in Different Countries. Interspersed with Stories, Moral and Entertaining (1803)
- Sacred Lectures from the holy scriptures, on the old and New Testament; interspersed with moral and religious reflections. Expressly written for the purpose of implanting in the minds of youth early impressions of the duty they owe to their creator; and shewing the dreadful consequences of sin and disobedience. By Elizabeth Somerville, author of several juvenile publications. In two volumes. (London: T. Hurst, 1803)
- The history of little Charles, and his friend Frank Wilful (1808)
- Aurora and Maria; or the Advantages of Adversity. A Moral Tale. (London: Philip Norbury, 1809)
- The history of little Phoebe and the reclaimed child (1809)

=== Reception ===
The British Critic describes Somerville's Preludes to knowledge… as “a very [pleasing] and proper book for children about ten or twelve years of age, in which [amusement] is judiciously blended with [instruction]."

The Biographical Dictionary of Authors in Great Britain (1816) refers to Somerville as an "author of several ingenious books for children."

In the Anti-Jacobin Review, Somerville's book Aurora and Maria; or the Advantages of Adversity. A Moral Tale, is described as "a very neat, interesting, instructive, and moral tale, replete with natural and affecting incidents, impressive examples, and salutary lessons very well adapted to...improve the minds of the youth."

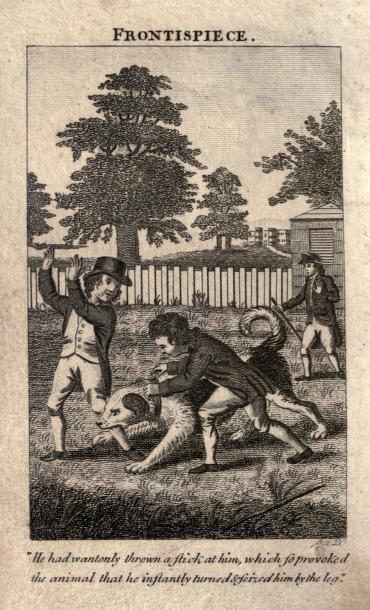
Frontispiece from Elizabeth Somerville's James Manners, little John, and their dog Bluff (London: Darton and Harvey / E. Newbery, 1801)

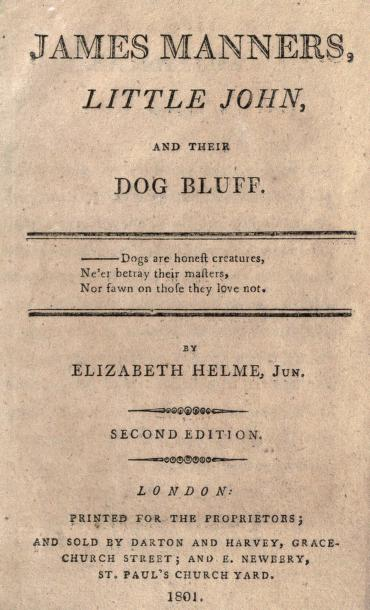
Title page from Elizabeth Somerville's James Manners, little John, and their dog Bluff (London: Darton and Harvey / E. Newbery, 1801)

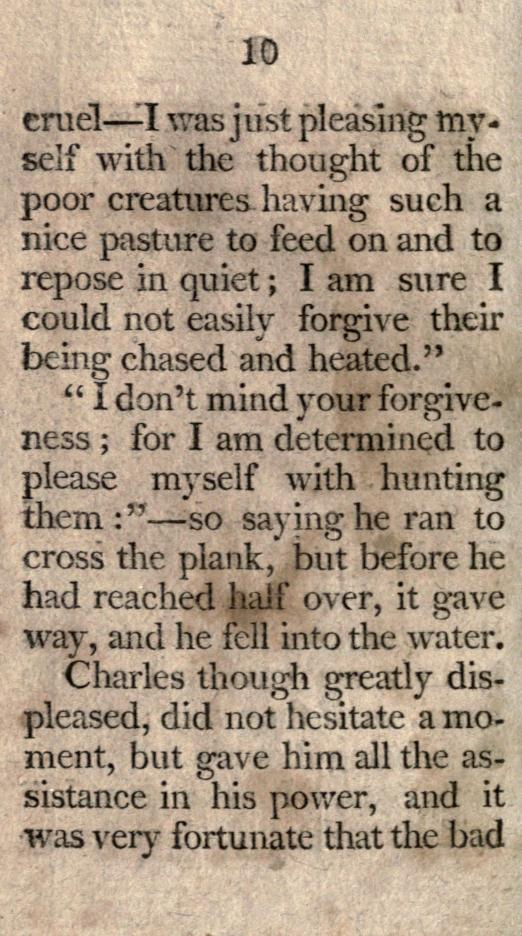
Page from Elizabeth Somerville's The history of little Charles, and his friend Frank Wilful: embellished with cuts (Originally printed in London. U.S. edition: Litchfield [Conn.]: Printed by Hosmer & Goodwin, 1808, p. 10 ).

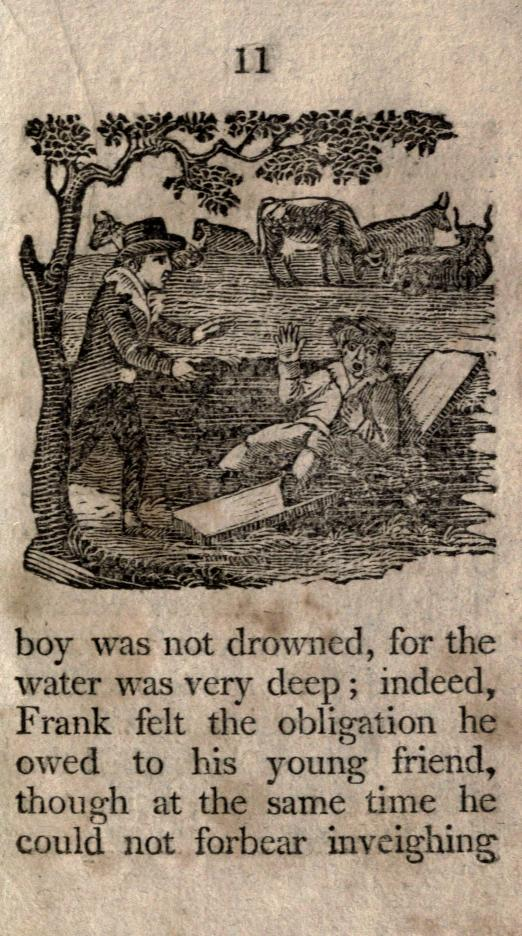
Woodcut from Elizabeth Somerville's The history of little Charles, and his friend Frank Wilful: embellished with cuts (Originally printed in London. U.S. edition: Litchfield [Conn.]: Printed by Hosmer & Goodwin, 1808, p. 11).
