= Cobwebs to Catch Flies =

1783 book by Ellenor Fenn

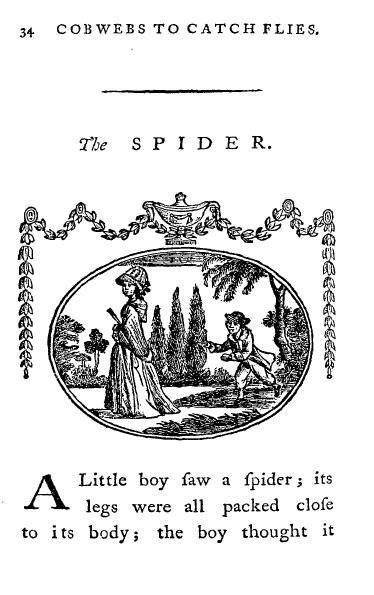
A typical page from an early Marshall edition

Cobwebs to Catch Flies (1783) is a children's book by Ellenor Fenn, originally anonymous, but later editions were advertised as being by Mrs Teachwell or "Mrs Lovechild". It was a reading primer and was one of the first books to differentiate between reading age groups, and which was widely used until the 1890s.

== Description ==
The work was originally published in two volumes – one for children from three to five years, and the second for those from five and eight, but later editions combined them into one. It consisted of a series of short, illustrated dialogues between children, teaching basic reading skills. It was an innovative book in several respects as it focused on the child reader’s own experience and interests, including toys, pets, games, visits to the fair etc., and was one of the first books to differentiate between reading age groups; each volume became progressively more difficult as the child progressed. The early editions were printed in large types containing charming woodcut illustrations, and each volume had an engraved frontispiece seeking to represent the content of the stories.

== Background ==
The book was conceived as a component part of the author’s elaborate and very expensive teaching scheme known as 'A set of toys', and copies were provided with the scheme, but Mrs. Fenn's publisher John Marshall realized that the book might also be successful in its own right. It proved to be Marshall's most profitable title and he produced many undated editions, keeping the title constantly in print until about 1815. During this period the illustrations became progressively more worn and the work more carelessly printed.

== Later editions ==
Marshall assigned the copyright to Baldwin, Cradock, & Joy, who published new editions throughout the 1820s and 1830s, improving production standards and commissioning new versions of the illustrations.

The Dublin printer John Rice pirated the work in 1794, and in 1799 Marshall’s rival, Elizabeth Newbery, published an un-illustrated French language version. Copies of the original edition were exported to the USA where they were copied in editions published in Philadelphia by Johnson & Warner, (1813 and 1814), in Baltimore by E. J. Coale, (1825), in New York City by Mahlon Day, (between 1832 and 1837), and in New York and Boston by C.S. and J.H. Francis in 1851.

Meanwhile, in the Britain, Darton and Co. published several editions between 1842 and 1858, and the Society for Promoting Christian Knowledge (SPCK) others between 1844 and 1860, which were adapted to include a religious message. Lockwood and Co. took over the publication in 1862. An edition with a coloured lithographic frontispiece was jointly published by Frederick Warne in London and Scribner, Welford, and Co. in New York in 1870, which was republished in 1894 by Warne. George Routledge and Sons published an edition in 1871, and Crosby Lockwood in 1885.

An imitation New cobwebs to catch little flies was also published by the Religious Tract Society, between 1833 and 1839.
