= John Marshall (publisher) =

English publisher (1756–1824)

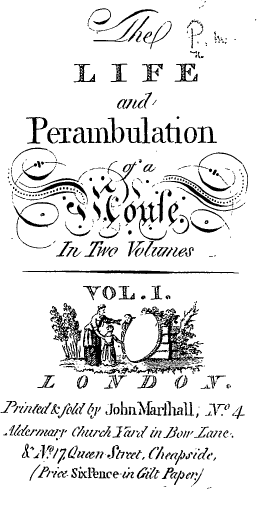
- Title page from Dorothy Kilner's Life and Perambulation of a Mouse, with one of Marshall's imprints
- Born: Baptized 28 November 1756, London, St Mary Aldermary
- Died: July 1824; London
- Occupations: Publisher, printer, printseller
- Spouse: Eleanor Marshall
- Children: Eleanor Elizabeth Marshall, John Marshall jnr.
- Parent(s): Richard Marshall (printer, publisher, printseller) and Ellenor Marshall

John Marshall (1756–1824) was a London publisher who specialized in children's literature, chapbooks, educational games and teaching schemes. He called himself the "Children's Printer" and children his "young friends". He was pre-eminent in England as a children's book publisher from about 1780 to 1800. After 1795, he became the publisher of Hannah More's Cheap Repository Tracts, but a dispute with her led to him issuing a similar series of his own. About 1800 Marshall began publishing a series of miniature libraries, games and picture books for children. After his death in July 1824, his business was continued either by his widow or his unmarried daughter, both of whom were named Eleanor.

== Life ==
John Marshall was baptised 28 November 1756 in the parish church of St Mary Aldermary, London, the son of Richard Marshall (fl. 1752–1779) and his wife Ellenor. His father was a junior partner, then full partner and finally owner of a successful chapbook and popular print business at No. 4, Aldermary Churchyard, off Watling Street, which had been founded in 1755 by William and Cluer Dicey. He was bound apprentice to the printer Edward Gilberd of Watling Street 3 September 1771, but transferred to his father's business a year later and became a freeman of the Stationers' Company on 6 October 1778. He inherited his father's business the following year.

John married Eleanor Blashfield on 4 December 1788. Their two children were Eleanor Elizabeth, born 8 March 1790, and John, born 28 May 1792. He died during the summer of 1824.

== History of the business ==
Richard Marshall left half his business to his son John, and a quarter each to his nephew James and his widow. It continued as John Marshall and Co. until November 1789, when the partnership was voluntarily wound up and John continued in business on his own. In October 1806 Marshall moved it to 140 Fleet Street, where it remained until his death in 1824. Under his will made in 1813, the firm was bequeathed to his widow Eleanor Marshall, but probate was granted on 14 July 1824 to his unmarried daughter Eleanor Elizabeth Marshall. One of these continued the business as "E. Marshall" until about 1829.

=== Street literature ===
Richard's firm was based on selling popular prints, maps, chapbooks, broadside ballads and other forms of street literature. These continued to be prominent in its output until the mid-1790s. There are examples of all of these that contain John Marshall's imprint, but the extent of his involvement is difficult to ascertain, as many were undated and bore the imprint "Printed and sold in Aldermary Churchyard".

=== Children's literature ===
Richard had begun in the 1770s to publish children's books as a sideline; this side was greatly expanded by John and his partners after 1780. Marshall recruited several new female authors and published some of the most important children's literature of the time, notably:

- Mary Ann Kilner: The Adventures of a Pincushion, The Adventures of a Whipping-Top, Jemima Placid, Memoirs of a Peg-Top, William Sedley
- Dorothy Kilner: Anecdotes of a Boarding-School, The Histories of More Children than One, The Life and Perambulation of a Mouse, The Rotchfords
- Ellenor Fenn (Mrs Teachwell): Cobwebs to Catch Flies, Fables in Monosyllables, The Mother's Grammar, The Rational Dame, Rational Sports, School occurrences
- Sarah Trimmer: Scripture Lessons, various prints of biblical and historical scenes, with accompanying descriptions, for use in Sunday and other schools
- Lucy Peacock – The Life of a Bee, Emily; or, The Test of Sincerity

All of these went through several editions. Some remained in print well into the 19th century, such as Cobwebs to Catch Flies, and The Life and Perambulation of a Mouse, which was praised by Sarah Trimmer and by Mary Wollstonecraft.

Marshall's catalogue of May 1793 listed 113 children's book titles, two children's magazines, and various teaching aids.

=== Teaching aids ===
Marshall ventured into publishing teaching aids about 1785, with Mrs Teachwell's Set of Toys, for enabling Ladies to instill the Rudiments of Spelling, Reading, Grammar, and Arithmetic, under the Idea of Amusement, which was accompanied by an instruction manual, The Art of teaching in sport. Other teaching aids listed in the 1793 catalogue were Miss Cowley's Pocket Sphere (for teaching geography), and Alphabetical Cards for enticing Children to acquire an early Knowledge of their Letters. A "dissected map of England", forerunner of modern Jigsaw puzzles, was also advertised between 1795 and 1801.

=== Retail bookselling ===
In 1787 the business opened a retail bookshop at 17 Queen Street, Cheapside (hitherto the Aldermary Churchyard premises had principally served as a wholesale supplier and printing office). The shop seems to have closed about 1799, when the business appears to have suffered a financial setback after the break with Hannah More.

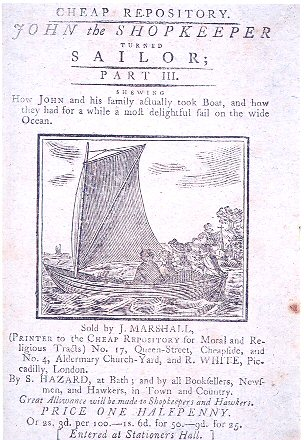
One of Hannah More's Cheap Repository Tracts printed and sold by Marshall, c.1796.

=== Children's periodicals ===
On four occasions in his career Marshall attempted to start periodicals for children. These were:

- The Juvenile magazine; or, An instructive and entertaining miscellany for youth of both sexes edited by Lucy Peacock, 1788
- The Family magazine; or, a Repository of religious instruction, and rational amusement edited by Sarah Trimmer, 1788–1789
- The Children's magazine; or, Monthly repository of instruction and delight, 1799
- The Picture magazine, or, monthly exhibition for young people, 1800–1801

=== Cheap Repository Tracts ===
Marshall was the London printer and publisher of Hannah More's Cheap Repository Tracts between 1795 and December 1797. After the dispute with More in 1797, Marshall published his own series of Cheap Repository Tracts until 1799. After the formation of the Religious Tract Society in 1799, Marshall abandoned tract publishing and concentrated on further forms of publication for children.

=== Miniature libraries and cabinets ===
Marshall published a range of miniature libraries in wooden cases, after 1799, including "The Child's Latin Library", "The Doll's Library", "The Infant's Library", or "The Juvenile; or child's library". Similarly, he published a range of "Cabinets" (wooden boxes containing sets of picture cards and miniature books), such as The Cabinet of Beasts, The Cabinet of Birds, The Cabinet of Fishes, The Infant's Alphabetical Cabinet, The Infant's Cabinet of the Cries of London and The Doll's Casket.

=== Picture books ===
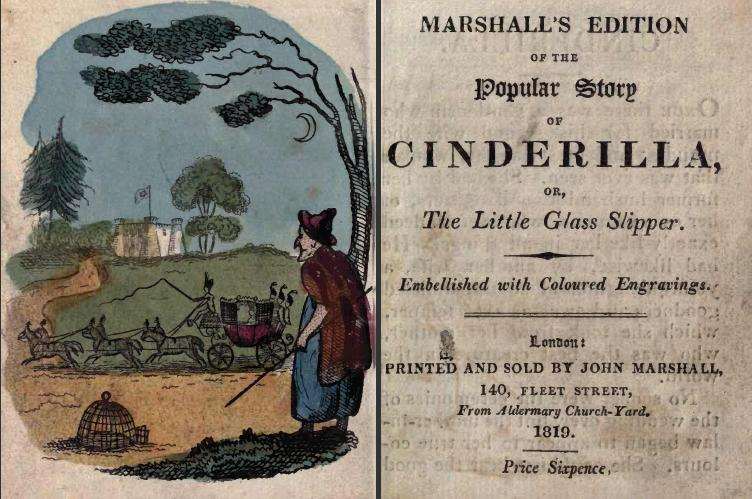
The frontispiece and title page of Marshall's edition of Cinderella, 1819.

Marshall was an early innovator in coloured picture books for children, illustrated with hand-coloured etchings. During the early 19th century, he published editions of many traditional fairy tales such as Cinderella, Puss in Boots and Aladdin, along with accumulative rhymes and games such as "This Is the House That Jack Built", "The Barn that Tom built", and "The Gaping Wide-mouth'd Waddling Frog", with hand-coloured illustrations. He was also noted for a range of books of humorous verses illustrated by the caricaturist Isaac Robert Cruikshank.

=== Other activities ===
Like other printers and publishers of the time, Marshall was involved in selling patent medicines, although in his case these were aimed specifically at children. He advertised "an improved preparation of Dr. Waite's Worm Medicine... impossible to distinguish it from the most agreeable Gingerbread Nut", from premises at 42, Long-lane, West Smithfield, in 1793. He also appears to have supported the movement in Britain to abolish the slave trade. He printed a number of anti-slavery tracts, including a print showing "The cruel treatment of slaves in the West Indies" in 1793.

== Children's literature ==
After the death of John Newbery, the first publisher to make a profit publishing children's literature, many firms began to enter the business, but none ever had the monopoly Newbery did. Marshall was one of the most successful and published "the most original books", popularizing fictional biography for juvenile readers. In general, Marshall published books that were more serious than Newbery's, emphasizing the "instruction" part of "to instruct and delight", the imperative of 18th-century children's literature. His catalogue included this announcement:

Ladies, Gentlemen, and the Heads of Schools, are requested to observe, that the beforementioned Publications are original,, and not compiled: as also, that they were written to suit the various Ages for which they are offered; but on a more liberal Plan, and in a different Style from the Generality of Works designed for young People: being entirely divested of that prejudicial Nonsense (to young Minds) the Tales of Hobgoblins, Witches, Fairies, Love, Gallantry, etc. with which such little Performances heretofore abounded.

However, although Marshall advocated more disciplined stories, he also published Newbery-inspired stories that "stressed amusement" and would sell well, including fairy tales. By the mid-1780s, he was focusing almost exclusively on moral works with a strong Christian element. As Samuel Pickering, Jr., a scholar of 18th-century children's literature, explains, "He was a shrewd publisher and, reading the market well, he saw that instruction would sell. While keeping a selection of old-fashioned, amusing books in print... he established a reputation as a printer of moral works." Mary Jackson describes his strategy in sharper terms, saying he engaged in "apparent duplicity and sharp tricks", claiming he was a reforming publisher but issuing tales that had little moral redemption in the eyes of Trimmer, Fenn, Kilner, and others. In 1795, he became a printer for Hannah More's Cheap Repository Tracts.

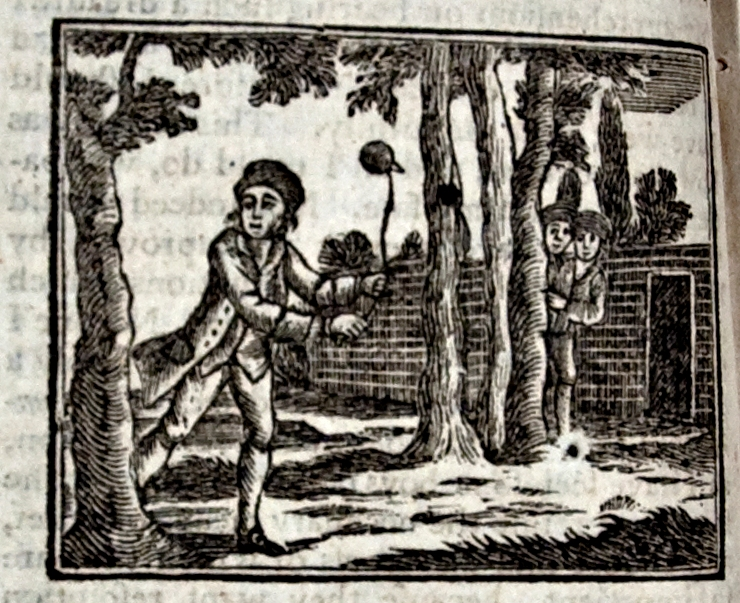
An illustration from a Marshall publication, Memoirs of a Peg-Top by Mary Ann Kilner, showing the imminent destruction of the top

Marshall learned from Anna Laetitia Barbauld's innovative children's literature and began to use large fonts and margins. He also took up graduated readers like her Lessons for Children. Ellenor Fenn wrote a series for him, which began with Cobwebs to Catch Flies. He recognized the value of illustrations in children's books. Beginning in the mid-1780s, he and Sarah Trimmer published several sets of illustrated stories about the Bible and ancient history.

Like most commercial publishers at the time, Marshall was driven by profit and paid his writers poorly. Mrs Fenn received no monetary payment for her works, merely printed copies of Marshall's works to give away as gifts to her friends and neighbours. Mrs Trimmer's Description of a Set of Prints of Scripture History and Description of a Set of Prints of Ancient History, among others, went through many editions and no doubt made money for Marshall, but she did not see much of the profits. She complained that he treated her like "a mere bookseller's fag". More described him as "selfish, tricking and disobliging from first to last" and resented his desire to make as much money as possible from the Cheap Repository Tracts. However, she saw their publication as a moral crusade, whereas he had grown up publishing such works as a business.

Like Newbery, Marshall's authors advertised his books within their texts. For example, in Anecdotes of a Boarding School, a mother gives her daughter Marshall's Dialogues and Letters and Adventures of a Pincushion as she is going off to school. In Jemima Placid, the heroine reads books that could "be bought at Mr. Marshall's" and her father decides to buy many for his friends.
