= John Evans (printer) =

English printer

- Died: Wellclose Square
- Occupations: Newspaper editor and printer

John Evans (1774–1828), was an English printer.

== Life ==
Evans, a native of Bristol, was baptised at St. Philip's Church, Bristol, 16 January 1774. At various periods of his life he was concerned in printing and editing more than one newspaper in Bristol, including the Bristol Observer, a weekly journal, which, started in January 1819, and which collapsed in October 1823, after 322 numbers had been published.

== Death ==
Early in 1828 he left Bristol for the purpose of entering into some engagement with a printer named J.D. Maurice, of Fenchurch Street, London, who was also principal proprietor of the newly erected Brunswick Theatre in Well Street, Wellclose Square. Evans was killed by the sudden falling in of the theatre on the morning of 28 February 1828, when in his fifty-fifth year. He had become a widower only a few weeks before, and left two daughters and a son.

== Works ==
Evans was author of Practical Observations on the due performance of Psalmody. With a short postscript on the Present State of Vocal Music in other Departments (Bristol 1823) and A Chronological Outline of the History of Bristol, and the Stranger's Guide through its Streets and Neighbourhood (London 1824) This miscellany includes a list of Evans's contributions to the Bristol Observer. Some anecdotes by Evans of William Combe appear in the Gentleman's Magazine, 1823, ii. 185.
