= Ellenor Fenn =

British writer (1743–1813)

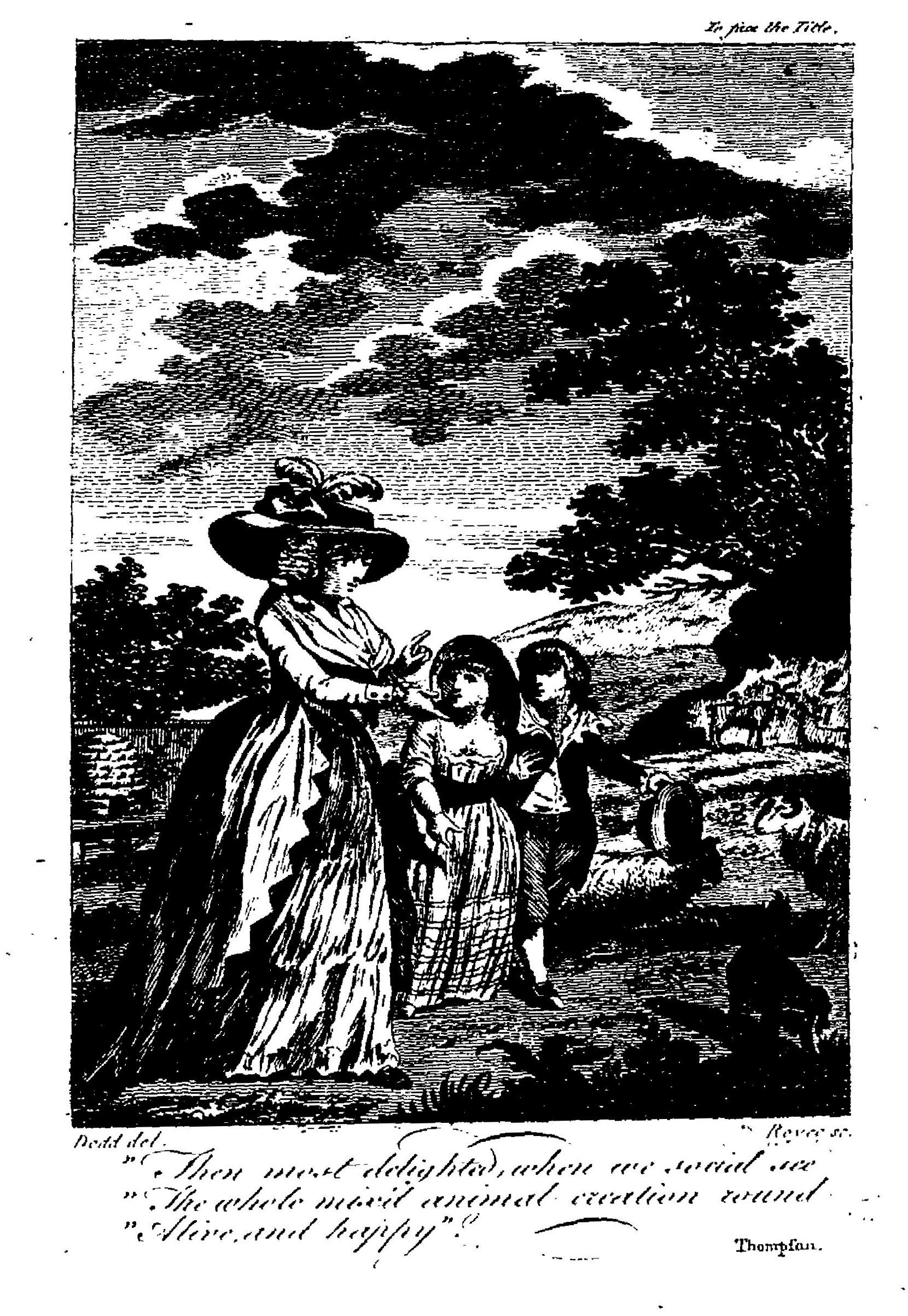
- From Fenn's The Rational Dame
- Born: Ellenor Frere; 12 March 1743; Westhorpe, Suffolk, England
- Died: 1 November 1813 (aged 70); Dereham, England
- Resting place: St Bartholomew's church, Finningham
- Occupation: Writer
- Spouse: John Fenn (m. 1766)
- Writing career
- Pen name: Mrs. Teachwell; Mrs. Lovechild
- Period: 1780-1805?

Ellenor Fenn (née Frere; 12 March 1743 – 1 November 1813; pseudonyms, Mrs. Teachwell, Mrs. Lovechild) was a prolific 18th-century British writer of children's books.

== Early life ==
Ellenor Frere was born on 12 March 1743 in Westhorpe, Suffolk to Sheppard and Susanna Frere. John Frere was her elder brother and John Hookham Frere her nephew. In 1766, she married the antiquarian John Fenn and moved with him to Hill House, Dereham, Norfolk. Although they had no biological children, they adopted and brought up an orphaned heiress, Miss Andrews.

== Career ==
Fenn wrote a series of children's books for her nephews and nieces, inspired by Anna Laetitia Barbauld's Lessons for Children (1778-9), and in 1782 she wrote to the children's publisher John Marshall asking whether he would be willing to publish them. Between 1782 and 1812, he published numerous books by Fenn, often anonymously or under the pseudonyms Mrs. Teachwell or Mrs. Lovechild. Cobwebs to Catch Flies (1783), a reading primer, was perhaps her most popular book; it went through multiple editions in both Britain and America until the 1870s. Her Child's Grammar went through sixty editions by the 1860s.

Fenn also created toys and games that encouraged mothers to teach their children themselves. Andrea Immel, a specialist in 18th-century childhood, writes that through her games, we can "recognize [Fenn] as an early advocate of child-centered teaching strategies" The games emphasize conversation and the child's own world; they encourage the mother to answer the child's questions and to spontaneously teach when the child is interested in learning.

In 1795, Fenn had a falling out with her publisher, John Marshall, and moved her business to Elizabeth Newbery's firm and publishers in Norwich. Throughout her career, Fenn never received any royalties for her work, only free distribution copies of her works.

== Life and death in Dereham ==
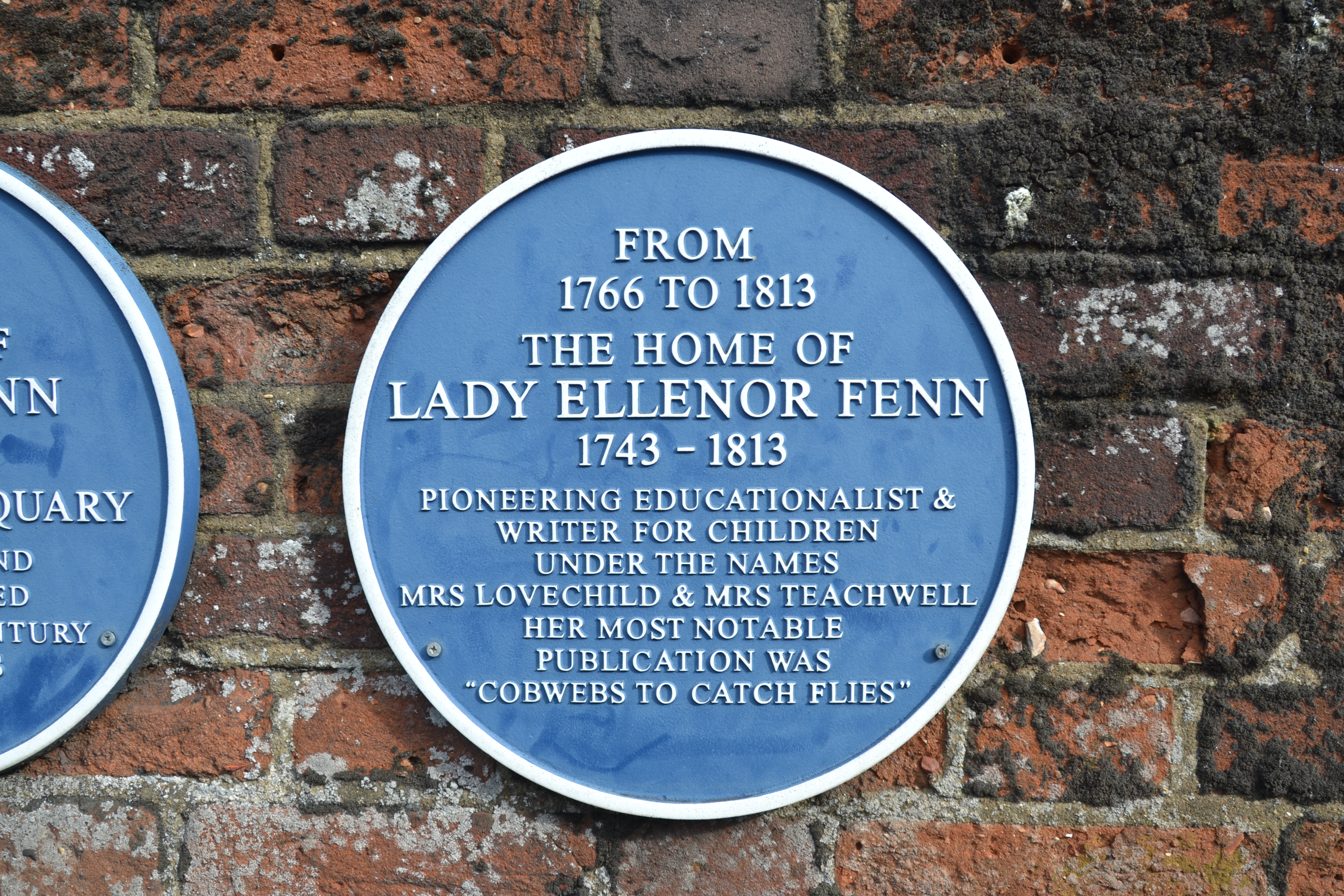
Blue Plaque erected to commemorate Ellenor Fenn, who lived at Hill House, Market Place, Dereham

When Fenn's husband was knighted in 1787, Fenn became known as Lady Fenn. He served as High Sheriff of Norfolk from 1791–2. Upon his death on 14 February 1794, Fenn was left "financially secure" and able to devote more of her time to philanthropy. Fenn established a Sunday School in Dereham in 1785 which by 1788 had over 100 pupils. She also started a needlework school and "revived the trade to tow-spinning to give poor women an income."

Fenn died at Dereham on 1 November 1813, aged 70, and was buried at St Bartholomew's church, Finningham, Suffolk.

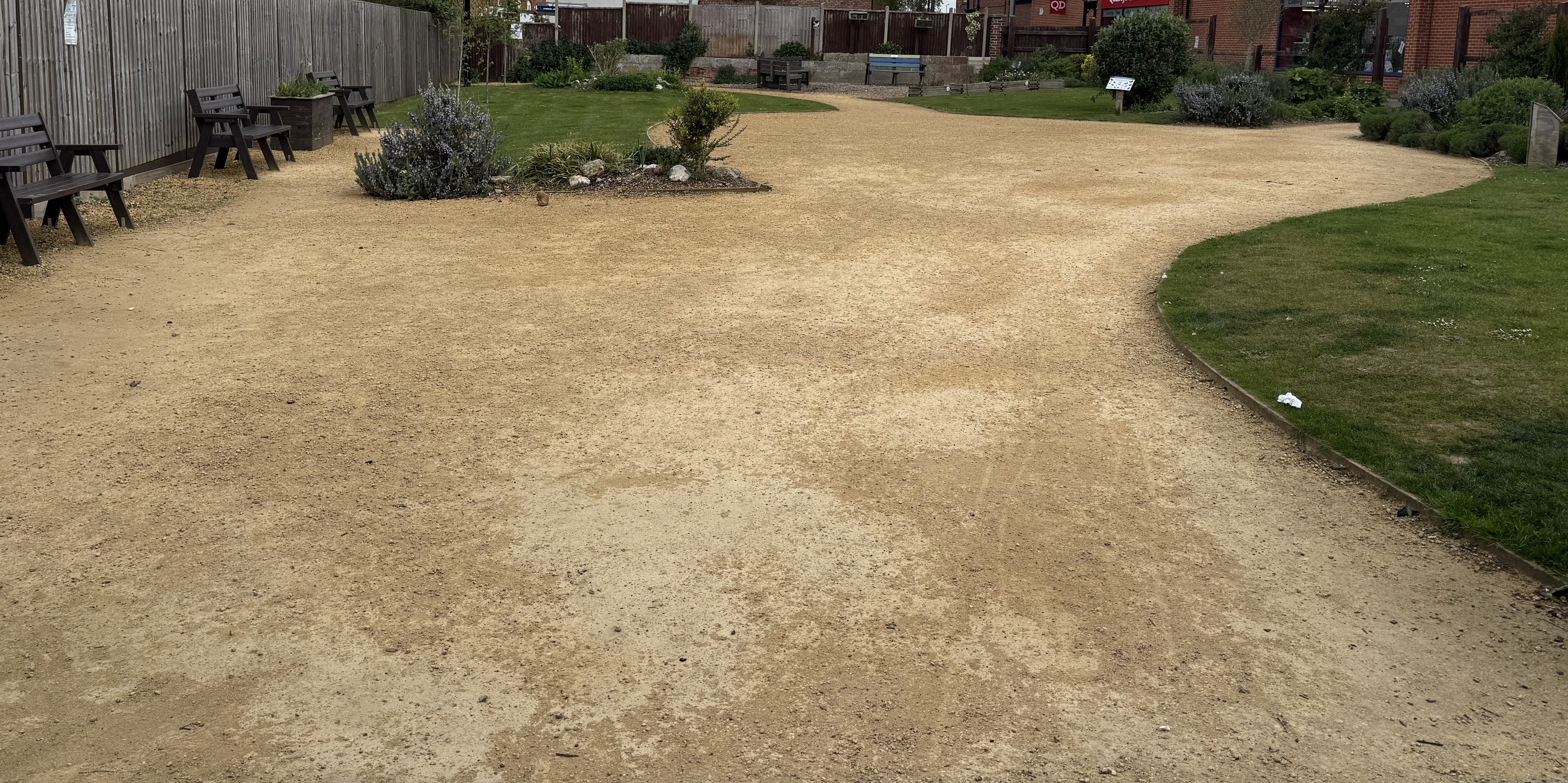
The Ellenor Fenn Garden in Dereham

On 29 November 2013, two hundred years after her death, Fenn was finally recognised in Dereham with the unveiling of a 'Blue Plaque' outside Hill House, her home for nearly fifty years, beside a renewed plaque for her husband. In September 2021, the Ellenor Fenn Garden was inaugurated in Dereham's town centre.

== Literary analysis ==
Many of Fenn's works were directed towards young girls and women. She wrote an entire series entitled "Mrs. Teachwell's Library for Young Ladies." Many of these works focus on how to teach and outline Fenn's idea of proper reading materials.

Fenn published several volumes of what we would now call picturebooks that employed woodcuts. Her sense of the visual layout of her books was keen and she carefully dictated to her publishers the margins and font sizes of her books.

== Selected works ==
The fairy spectator; or, The invisible monitor, by Mrs. Teachwell and her family (1790)

This list of works relies almost exclusively on Carol Percy's bibliography of Fenn's works.

- Set of Toys (c.1780) - game
- School Occurrences (1782-3)
- Juvenile Correspondence (1783)
- Cobwebs to Catch Flies (1783)
- Fables, by Mrs. Teachwell (1783)
- Fables in Monosyllables by Mrs. Teachwell (1783)
- Rational Sports (1783)
- School Dialogues for Boys (1783-4)
- Female Guardian (1784)
- Art of Teaching in Sport (1785)
- The Rational Dame (1786)
- A Spelling Book (1787)
- Fairy Spectator (1789)
- Juvenile Tatler (1789)
- The Village Matron (1795)
- The Short History of Insects (1796); as the long title shows, this work was produced in association with the Leverian Museum.
- The Infant's Friend (1797)
- The Mother's Grammar (1798)
- The Child's Grammar (1798)
- Parsing Lessons for Elder Pupils (1798)
- Parsing Lessons for Young Children (1798)
- The Friend to Mothers (1799)
- Family Miscellany (1805)
- The Teacher's Assistant (1809)

== See also ==
- Sarah Trimmer

== Bibliography ==
- Immel, Andrea. "Mistress of Infantine Language: Lady Ellenor Fenn, Her Set of Toys, and the Education of Each Moment." Children’s Literature 25 (1997): 215–228.
- Percy, Carol. "Disciplining Women?: Grammar, gender, and leisure in the works of Ellenor Fenn (1743-1813)." Historiographia Linguisticia 33 (2006): 109–137.
- Stoker, David. "Ellenor Fenn". Oxford Dictionary of National Biography. Retrieved on 6 March 2007.
- Stoker, David. "'Ellenor Fenn as "Mrs Teachwell" and "Mrs Lovechild": a pioneer late eighteenth century children's writer, educator and philanthropist". Princeton University Library Chronicle (2007).
