= Mary Ann Kilner =

English writer of children's books

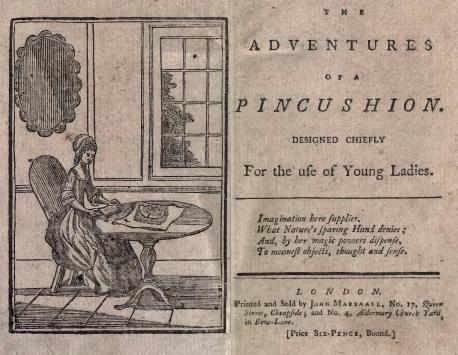
- An early edition of Adventures of a pincushion
- Born: 14 December 1753; London, England
- Died: 1 December 1831 (aged 77); Maryland Point, London
- Occupation: Writer
- Writing career
- Subject: Education
- Notable work: The Adventures of a Pincushion

Mary Ann Kilner (née Maze; 1753–1831) was a prolific English writer of children's books in the late 18th century. The most famous was The Adventures of a Pincushion (c. 1780–1783). Together, she and her sister-in-law, Dorothy Kilner, published over thirty books. Mary Ann published under the name "S. S.", which stood for her home in Spital Square, London.

== Early life ==
Mary Ann was born on 14 December 1753 at Spital (then Spittal) Square, London, the youngest child of James Maze (died 1794), a prosperous Huguenot silk throwster and merchant. She was bilingual in English and French and said to be very intelligent. Her childhood friends were the siblings Dorothy (1755–1836) and Thomas Kilner (1750–1812). The two girls wrote to one another constantly during their childhood and teenage years. On 18 September 1774 Mary Ann married Thomas and moved to her husband's home at 33 Spital Square. They had five children, of whom Eliza (born 1776), Frances (born 1783) and George (born 1791) survived.

== Writing career ==
Following the appearance of her sister-in-law's The First Principles of Religion in 1780, Mary Ann approached Dorothy's publisher, John Marshall, with her own Familiar Dialogues for the Instruction and Amusement of Children of Four and Five years Old, which Marshall published the following year. Some works of fiction followed: Memoirs of a Peg Top and Jemima Placid in March 1782, and The Adventures of a Whipping Top and William Sedley the following year. She also published A Course of Lectures, for Sunday Evenings: containing Religious Advice to Young Persons in 1783. Her most famous title, The Adventures of a Pincushion, was published late 1783 or early 1784. All of these works were popular and reprinted several times, the last at regular intervals until the 1830s.

Their works were originally published anonymously, but after Dorothy adopted the initials M. P. (representing her home at Maryland Point), Mary Ann used S. S. (for Spital Square).

== Works ==
- The Adventures of a Pincushion..., c. 1780–1783
- A Course of Lectures for Sunday Evenings. Containing Religious Advice to Young Persons, c. 1783
- Jemima Placid, c. 1783
- William Sedley; or, the Evil Day Deferred, c. 1783
- Memoirs of a Peg-Top, c. 1785
- Familiar Dialogues for the Instruction and Amusement of Children..., c. 1790
- The Happy Family; or Memoirs of Mr and Mrs Norton..., c. 1790
