= Dorothy Kilner =

English children's writer 1755–1836

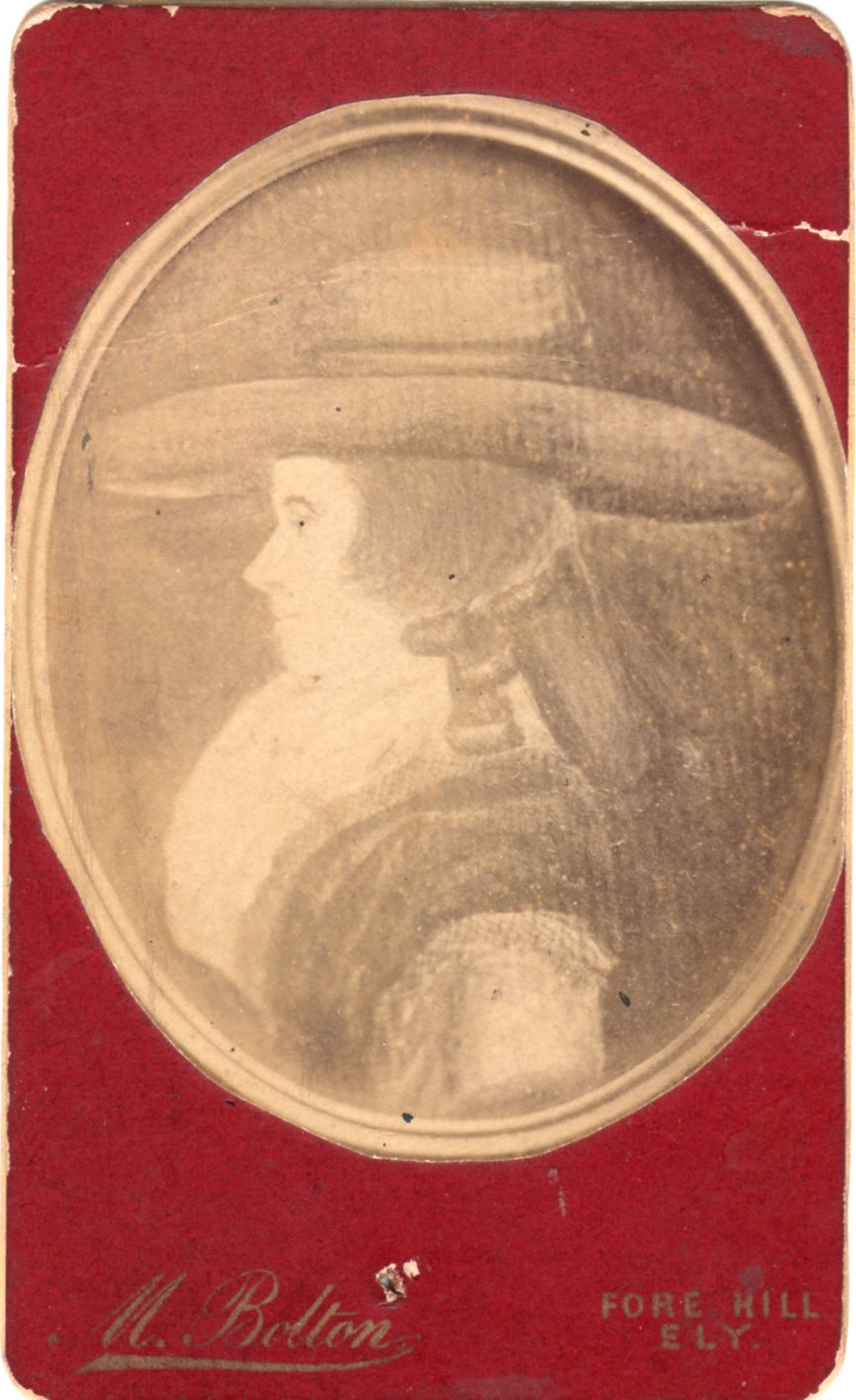
- Born: 1755
- Died: 1836 (aged 80–81)
- Occupation: writer
- Writing career
- Subject: education

Dorothy Kilner (17 February 1755 – 5 February 1836), who used the pseudonyms M. P. and Mary Pelham, was a prolific English writer of children's books. She combined a didactic approach with a strong knowledge of children's character. Her best known work was The Life and Perambulation of a Mouse (1784).

== Life ==
Dorothy was born on 17 February 1755, probably at Woodford, Essex as the youngest of five children of Thomas Kilner (1719–1804), public servant and landowner, and his wife, Frances, née Ayscough (1718–1768). The family moved to Maryland Point, then in Essex, in 1759.

Kilner was much inspired by a friendship that began in childhood with Mary Ann Maze (Mary Ann Kilner, 1753–1831). This involved exchanging copious verse letters on religious and personal matters. When Maze married Dorothy's brother Thomas Kilner (1750–1812) in 1774, Dorothy moved into their house in Spitalfields, London and helped to bring up their five children. Both Dorothy and Mary Ann became prolific writers of books for children. The family moved to Margate in 1787 and to Dorothy's father's house at Maryland Point in 1789. Predeceased by most of her family, Dorothy became an invalid after a back injury in 1817, and her mind became unhinged in her later years, but she was looked after by her niece Frances and her grand-niece Maria. She died on 5 February 1836 and was buried in West Ham.

== Writings ==
Dorothy Kilner published anonymously at first and then under the successive pseudonyms of M. P. and Mary Pelham, in line with general practice for female authors in that period. "M. P." may have referred to her home town of Maryland Point. Both she and her sister-in-law were published by the London firm of John Marshall.

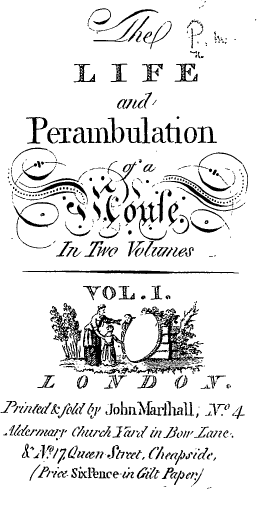
Title page from The Life and Perambulation of a Mouse

Kilner's best-known book was The Life and Perambulation of a Mouse (1784). This has been praised by a present-day critic as a book that "draws least attention to gaps and contradictions.... The story is episodic, as we follow the mouse Nimble through various households and overhear a variety of conversations.... This episodic, even picaresque, form effectively naturalizes—defuses—potential inconsistency." Other titles of hers included Anecdotes of a Boarding School, or an antidote to the vices of those Establishments (1790) and Little Stories for Little Folks (c. 1785).

Kilner wrote clearly and well, but in an age when the moral side of children's literature still predominated. So The Village School (1795) is subtitled A Collection of Entertaining Histories for the Instruction and Amusement of All Good Children. These feature a Mrs. Bell (the schoolteacher) and a Mr. Right (the parson). The book concludes: "From this fatal accident it is to be hoped, that every body will learn to be extremely cautious not to leave candles burning near linen, nor, indeed, anywhere, without constantly watching, that they may not do mischief." Nonetheless, her discernment of children's character and amusements shines through.

Copies of the books of Dorothy and Mary Ann were found long after their deaths in a trunk in their Maryland Point home.

Several titles of Kilner's titles continued to be reprinted for many years. The Life and Perambulation of a Mouse, for instance, reappeared in 1870 in a collection edited by Charlotte M. Yonge, entitled A Storehouse of Stories.
