= List of 18th-century British children's literature publishers =

List of 18th-century British children's literature publishers (arranged by year of birth):

- Thomas Boreman
- Mary Cooper
- John Newbery (1713–1767)
- Elizabeth Newbery
- John Marshall (publisher)
- William Darton
- John Harris (publisher)

== See also ==
- Books in the United Kingdom
