= Thomas Osborne (publisher) =

English publisher and bookseller

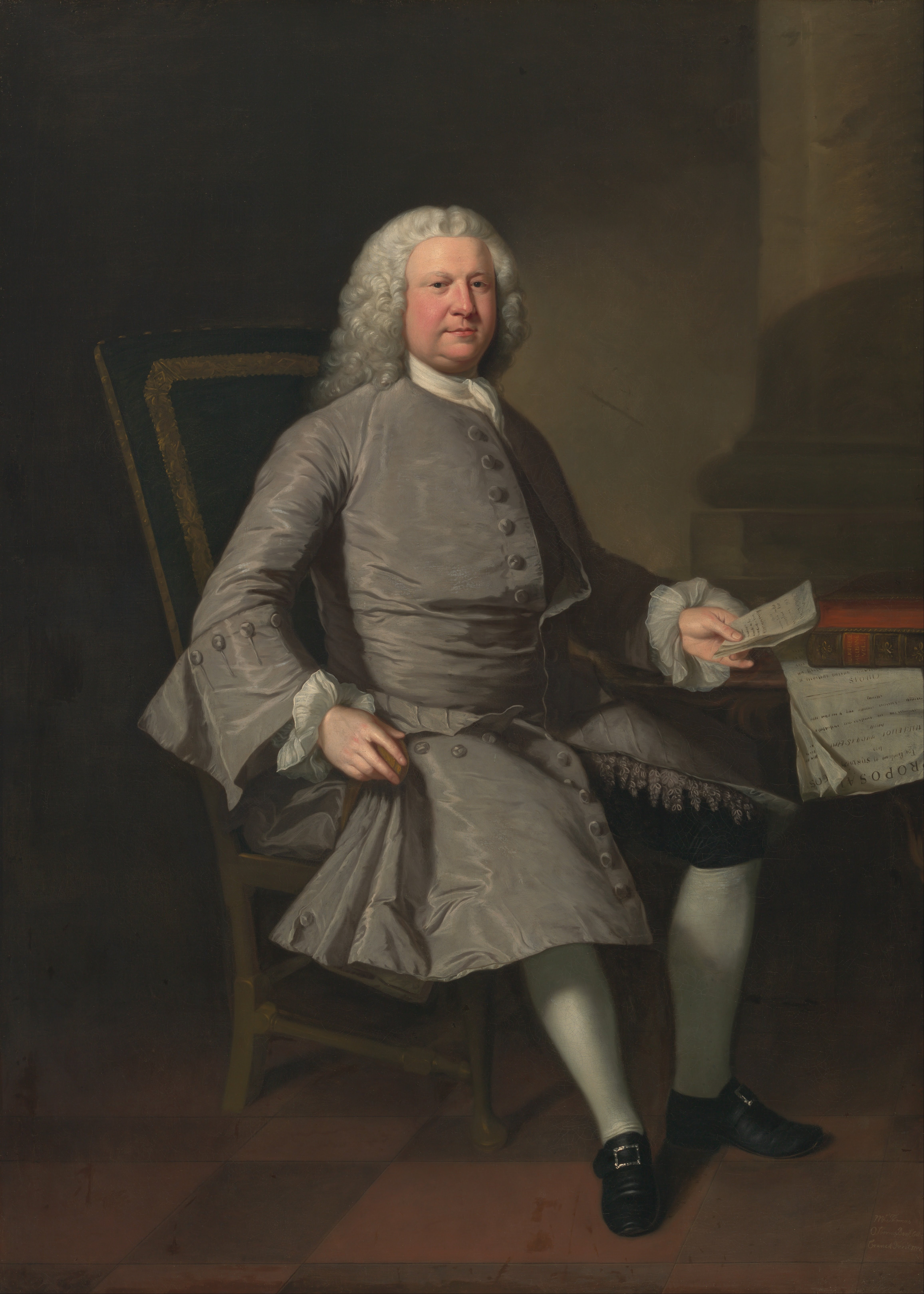
- Baptised: April 1704?
- Died: 21 August 1767
- Occupation: Bookseller, publisher

Thomas Osborne (bapt. April 1704? – 21 August 1767) was an English publisher and bookseller noted for his association with author Samuel Johnson and his purchase of the library of Edward Harley, 2nd Earl of Oxford.

== Early life ==
His father, also named Thomas Osborne, was a bookseller and stationer based in Gray's Inn, London. Osborne himself was probably the Thomas Osborne, son of Thomas and Brilliana Osborne, who was baptised on 13 April 1704 in the church of St Andrew's in Holborn. Osborne probably took up a major role in his father's business sometime before 1728, when he was made a liveryman of the Worshipful Company of Stationers and Newspaper Makers. In 1729, the firm also issued its first catalogue, a practice for which Osborne would become famous. Osborne the elder died in 1744, leaving the business and several properties to his son.

== Career ==
Osborne was well known for buying large libraries and offering the books for sale at fixed prices listed in catalogues. Most famously, after Edward Harley's death in 1741, Osborne purchased for £13,000 the extensive collection that had been assembled by Harley and his father, Robert Harley, 1st Earl of Oxford (Harley's collection of manuscripts was purchased by the British government and remains in the British Library as the Harleian Collection). Osborne hired William Oldys, who had been Edward Harley's literary secretary, and Samuel Johnson to compile a catalogue of the collection, which eventually ran to five volumes published from November 1742 to April 1745 under the name Catalogus Bibliothecae Harleianae. Osborne sold the first two volumes of the catalogue for ten shillings, which created enough irritation among his customers that he announced in the third edition that the price of the catalogue could be either applied to the purchase of a book from the collection or refunded. Oldys and Johnson also compiled for Osborne The Harleian Miscellany, an eight-volume selection of 16th- and 17th-century political and religious pamphlets, which was published from 1744 to 1746.

Harley's collection included a copy of William Tyndale's 1526 translation of the New Testament, the first complete version to be published in English. Osborne sold it for 15 shillings; in 1994, the British Museum bought the copy, one of only two surviving, for more than £1 million.

Beginning in 1748, Osborne made forays into the business of exporting books to British American destinations such as Williamsburg. Many of these were likely "rum books" which would not have sold in the London market.

Osborne, along with Mary Cooper, Ralph Griffiths, and John Baldwin, was one of the major publishers of works by the prolific writer and botanist John Hill. In an era when royalties for authors were virtually unknown, Hill's contracts with Osborne entitled him to periodic payments if the books whose copyright he assigned to Osborne sold unexpectedly well.

Osborne also took part in the Battle of the Booksellers, a prolonged effort by London publishers to win perpetual copyright protections. In 1765, he and publisher Andrew Millar sued Alexander Donaldson in the Court of Chancery over Donaldson's reprinting of books whose protection under the Statute of Anne had lapsed, maintaining that the works were protected in perpetuity by a common law copyright. In the cases, Osborne v. Donaldson and Millar v. Donaldson, Robert Henley, 1st Earl of Northington ruled in favour of Donaldson and against common law copyright. Henley proposed that the case be brought before the House of Lords, but Osborne and Millar refused, fearing a decisive rejection of their position.

In 1754, Osborne purchased a country house in Hampstead. A Chinese-style hand fan commemorating a party he held on 10 September to mark the purchase survives in a collection donated by Charlotte Guest to the British Museum.

Osborne's influence was not limited to London. He served as a primary supplier of English-language books to the nascent University of Göttingen, which had embarked on a major book-buying campaign in the decades after its founding in 1734 and had by 1800 accumulated around 17,000 English works. His large catalogues of the 1760s circulated around the literary capitals of continental Europe; philosopher Christian August Wichmann consulted one while researching his 1788 translation of John Cary's Essay on the State of England's Trade.

== Reputation and legacy ==
Osborne was sometimes mocked for his supposed short stature, ignorance, and abrasive manner. According to one often-repeated story, Osborne once visited Samuel Johnson to complain about his slowness in compiling the either Harleian catalogue or The Harleian Miscellany—irritating Johnson enough that he knocked Osborne to the floor. The event seems to have taken place around 1742, but its first known mention came about thirty years later, in a 1773 article in The London Packet. The article described an incident where writer Oliver Goldsmith had attacked bookseller Thomas Evans, publisher of The Packet, and mockingly contrasted Goldsmith's defeat with Johnson's supposed victory against Osborne. Around 1777, Hester Lynch Thrale wrote in her diary: "I asked [Johnson] the other day about his combat with that Osborne, how much of the story was true: 'It was true,' said he 'that I beat the fellow, and that was all; but the world so hated poor Osborne that they have never done multiplying the blows and increasing the weight of them for twenty years together.' "

Many retellings of the story mention that Johnson used a heavy folio as a weapon, but this detail is absent from the earliest accounts, including the 1773 Packet article, Thrale's diary entry, and a passage in James Boswell's 1791 Life of Samuel Johnson, based on Boswell's direct conversation with Johnson.

Alexander Pope mocked Osborne in the 1743 edition of The Dunciad, where Osborne takes the place of a character, called "Chetwood" or "Chapman" in previous editions, who loses a urinating contest for the love of novelist Eliza Haywood. Osborne had apparently angered Pope by deceptively selling remaindered copies of his translation of the Iliad. Osborne earned his share of praise as well; Thomas Dibdin, writing decades after Osborne's death in his Bibliomania (1809), called him "the most celebrated bookseller of his day."

Some of this negative reputation has persisted until the present: in a 1997 article, Robert DeMaria Jr. of Vassar College called him "relatively crude and rapacious", while Peter Martin described him as "tasteless and ill-mannered" in a 2008 biography of Johnson. In 2004, O. M. Brack gave a more undecided evaluation in Osborne's entry in the Oxford Dictionary of National Biography:

However, to assess Osborne's character properly is difficult. His undoubted success as a bookseller provoked an adverse reaction from other members of the trade who were eager to see his power and influence diminished. Most of the negative comments that have survived can be traced to Pope and Johnson. To be singled out by Pope is no distinction as the list of his satiric victims is extensive, while Johnson, whose lack of social skills is well documented, is a strange source for Osborne's failures in this regard.

After his death on 21 August 1767, Osborne was buried in the cemetery of St Mary's Church in Islington. His will divided his possessions among his wife, Anne; his brother-in-law William Smith; and his nephew William Toll.
