= Georges Marie Butel-Dumont =

French economist

Georges Marie Butel-Dumont (1725–1789) was a French writer of political economy, diplomat, and politician, famous for his theory of luxury.

Georges-Marie Butel-Dumont was born in Paris on October 28, 1725, the son of merchant Antoine Butel-Dumont and Marie-Anne Jolivet.

He was a member of the circle of Vincent de Gournay. In 1755, he published a vastly expanded and modified translation of the Essay on the state of England by the English merchant John Cary. Butel-Dumont's translation allowed Cary's mercantilist ideas to spread in Europe and served as the basis for various other translations, including an Italian translation that was published with a very long introduction by Antonio Genovesi.

In 1771, he published the Théorie du luxe, ou Traité dans lequel on entreprend d'établir que le luxe est un ressort, non seulement utile, mais même indispensablement nécessaire à la prospérité des états which made him widely known.

He also wrote short stories, published in 1772 as Journées mongoles, opuscule décent d'un docteur chinois.

He died in Paris on April 26, 1789.
