= Heathfield Park =

Country house and walled park in the village of Old Heathfield in East Sussex

Coordinates: 50.966°N 0.27°E

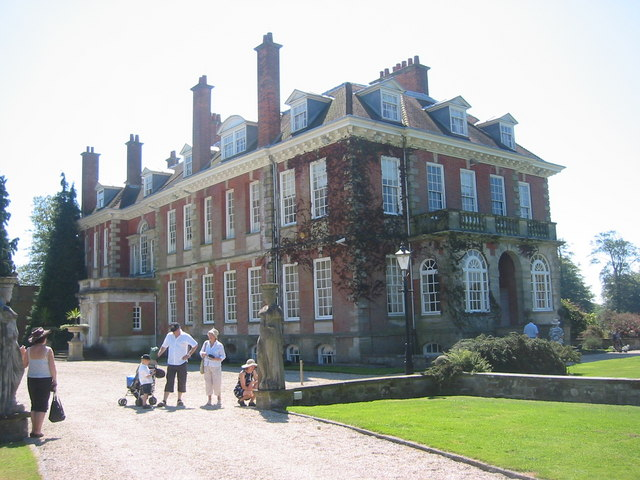

Heathfield Park is an English country house and walled park in the village of Old Heathfield in East Sussex.

== History ==
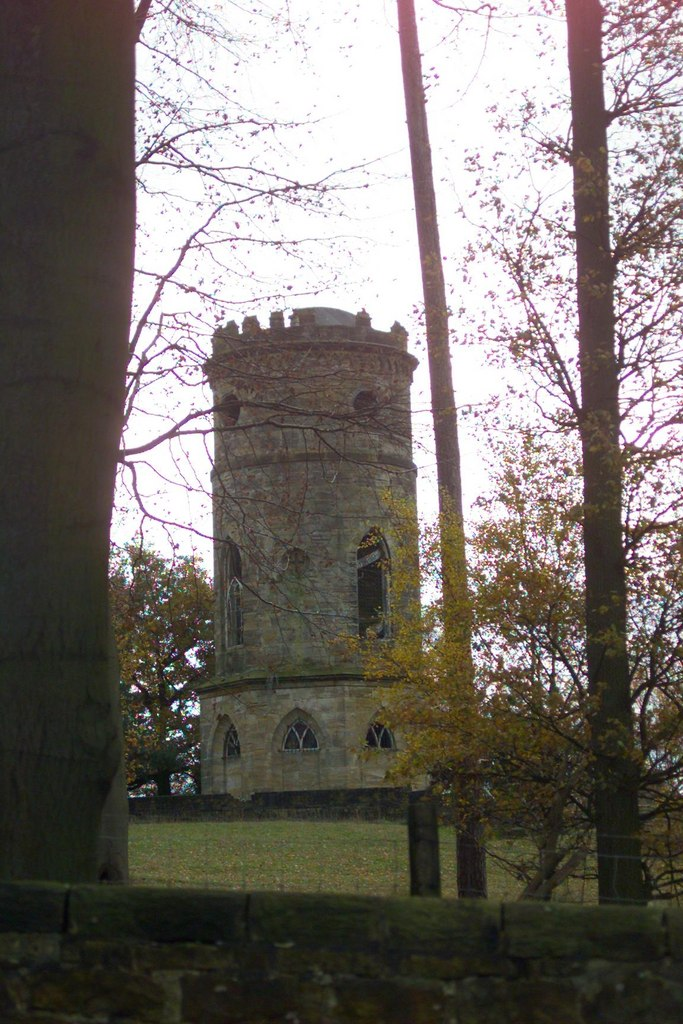
The Gibraltar Tower

Originally called Bayley Park, the mansion was begun by James Plummer in 1677 and continued by Raymond Blackmore in the early eighteenth century. George Augustus Eliott (created Lord Heathfield in 1787) purchased the property after gaining a substantial amount of prize money following his successful leadership during the siege of Havana in 1762. It was altered and enlarged in 1766 by architect Robert (later Sir Robert) Taylor. Elliot owned the house until his death in 1790.

It was renamed Heathfield Park after him in 1791 by his successor Francis Newbery, son of the publisher John Newbery. Newbery hired Humphrey Repton to landscape the park. Newbery built the "Gibraltar Tower" in one corner of the park, to commemorate Lord Heathfield's successful defence of Gibraltar from 1779 to 1782. The ground floor is octagonal and the upper part round, accessed by an internal circular staircase. It is also a Grade II* listed building.

From 1819 to 1890, Heathfield Park was the seat of the baronets of the Blunt family. It was later owned by art patron William Cleverly Alexander, who had it remodelled in 1895 in the Georgian Revival style by architect Sir Reginald Blomfield. Brick facing was substituted for stucco, and the south-east wing was added. Alexander, who owned Aubrey House in London, died when he fell down the basement stairs of the house in 1916. Heathfield House is a Grade II* listed building.

In 1963 the estate was purchased by Gerald Moore, an oral surgeon, artist, and former child actor. Moore opened the gardens to the public and established a riding school in 1963. In 1970 he restored the Gibraltar Tower, and in the 1970s he established a wildlife park. Moore sold the estate in 1993.

The estate is currently privately owned.

== Site of Special Scientific Interest ==
Part of the grounds is Heathfield Park SSSI, a biological Site of Special Scientific Interest, due to the habitats provided by the ghyll woodland. The lichen population is important on a county level.

== Heathfield Park Cricket Club ==
Part of the grounds of Heathfield Park contains a cricket club. Founded in 1878, it hosts regular league and friendly cricket for both adults and children.
