= John Harris (publisher) =

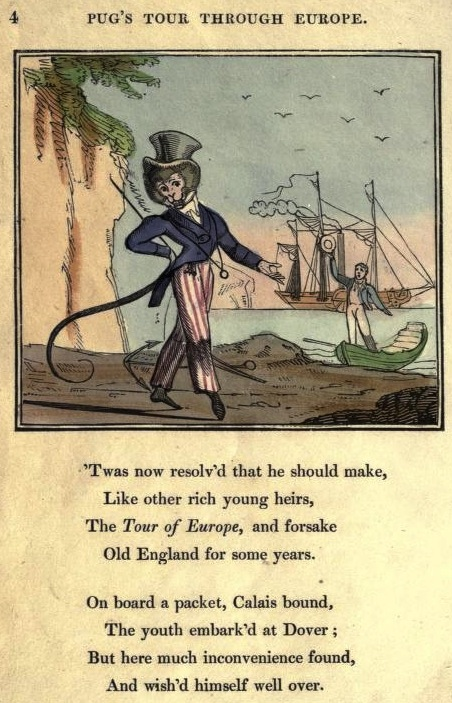
Page from Pug's Tour, published 1824, with hand-coloured illustration placed above the verse

John Harris (1756–1846) published children's books in England from the end of the 18th century to the mid-19th century, creating innovative and popular new styles. Apprenticed to Thomas Evans he found employment for a short time with John Murray before joining John Newbery's publishing firm.

Harris took over Newbery's firm which had passed first to his son Francis Newbery, then to his nephew and nephew's wife. Harris had managed the firm for Elizabeth Newbery and in 1801 bought it from her, renaming in his own name. Noticing that playful books such as Mother Goose's Melody sold better than Evangelical fare, in 1805 he issued The Comic Adventures of Old Mother Hubbard and Her Dog which departed from Newbery's publications in that it was completely devoid of didacticism and was meant to amuse. The first edition of the book was illustrated with copperplate engravings, one on each page, unlike Newbery's sparse use of woodcuts, and of a relatively small size (4 inches by 5 inches). Mother Hubbard sold well and began a run of similar books such as Whimsical Incidents in 1805 followed a year later by an edition of John Gilpin with colour illustrations.

The Butterfly's Ball was published in 1807 to great success, followed by a number of similar titles as well as a few cautionary tales such as The Cowslip by Daisy Turner. In 1807 he added a series he called Harris' Cabinet of Amusement and Instruction with stories that were meant to entertain children, unlike works written by authors such as Mrs. Trimmer who wrote to instruct children. by 1809 he had a catalogue of 419 titles that he sold from his premises at St Paul's Churchyard.

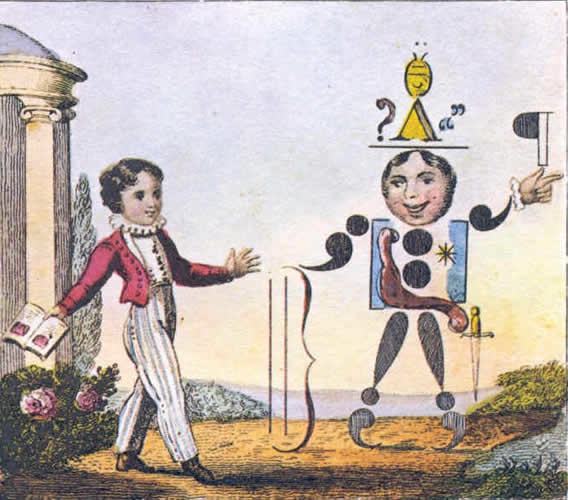
Hand-coloured engraved illustration, printed 1824, titled "Punctuation Personified".

In 1819 the firm became J. Harris & Son, and at that time they began to issue newly illustrated colour editions of editions previously published without colour illustrations. The books were expensive by the standard of the time, costing "One Shilling plain and Eighteen Pence coloured". By the end of the Regency era Harris, was one of the pre-eminent publishers of children's books in London. Not all of his work was well-received and appreciated. His book of tongue twisters, published in 1820, was denigrated as "degrading trash" and the colourful illustrations he included in his publications were called by one reviewer "gaudy glare". The books, however, continued to sell well and be popular.

Children's literature scholar Jack Zipes explains that because of traditional Puritan laws against fairy tales, English publishers had to import fairy stories of French and German origin. Harris published a volume of fairy tales in 1802, Mother Bunch's Fairy Tales, and in 1820 the firm published The Court of Oberon; or, The Temple of Fairie which children's literature and folklore scholar Iona Opie calls "an important volume" . Containing stories from Charles Perrault, Madame d'Aulnoy and The Arabian Nights, it was published the same year Taylor translated the Brothers Grimm's compilation of tales, Kinder- und Hausmärchen (illustrated by George Cruikshank).

The firm published instructional book as well, although titles such as Pug's Tour Through Europe; or, The Travell'd Monkey "written by Himself" (1824), with verse on the lower part of page and hand-coloured illustrations, though educational, was equally a satiric vision of "the typical gentleman's 'grand tour' of the Continent, a narrative that packages … British imperialism and cultural superiority together with satirical observations…"

In the 1820s the firm turned to hand-coloured woodcuts which achieved a more colourful look than the previously produced monochromatic copperplate illustrations. In 1824, Harris turned the firm over to his son and in 1843 it was bought by Griffith and Farran. John Harris died three years later.
