= The Secret History of Pandora's Box =

1742 British erotic novel

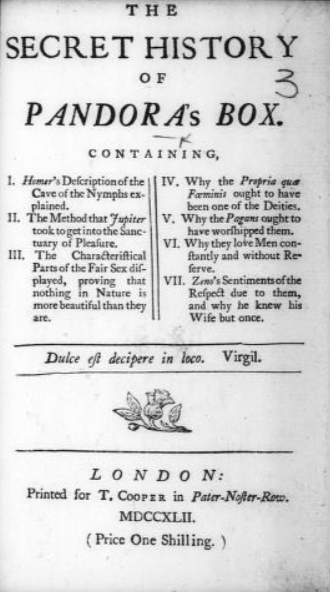
- Title page for The Secret History of Pandora's Box (1742)
- Genre: Erotic fiction
- Published: for T. Cooper, 1742
- Media type: Book
- OCLC: 265032089

The Secret History of Pandora's Box is an English erotic novel published anonymously in 1742 by the London publishers Mary Cooper and her husband. Its focus on the female genitalia proceeds with reference to Greek and Roman mythology, a common trope of the time. Another common and more specific trope in much erotic fiction of the time is allegorizing "the parts of the female sex" as a cave. The trope of Pandora's box was already associated with the female body in the previous decade, in Jonathan Swift's "The Lady's Dressing Room", and A Secret History proposes that the female parts "may well have been the original Pandora's box". The connection is found in subsequent erotic fiction as well.
