= Johann Christof Merck =

German painter

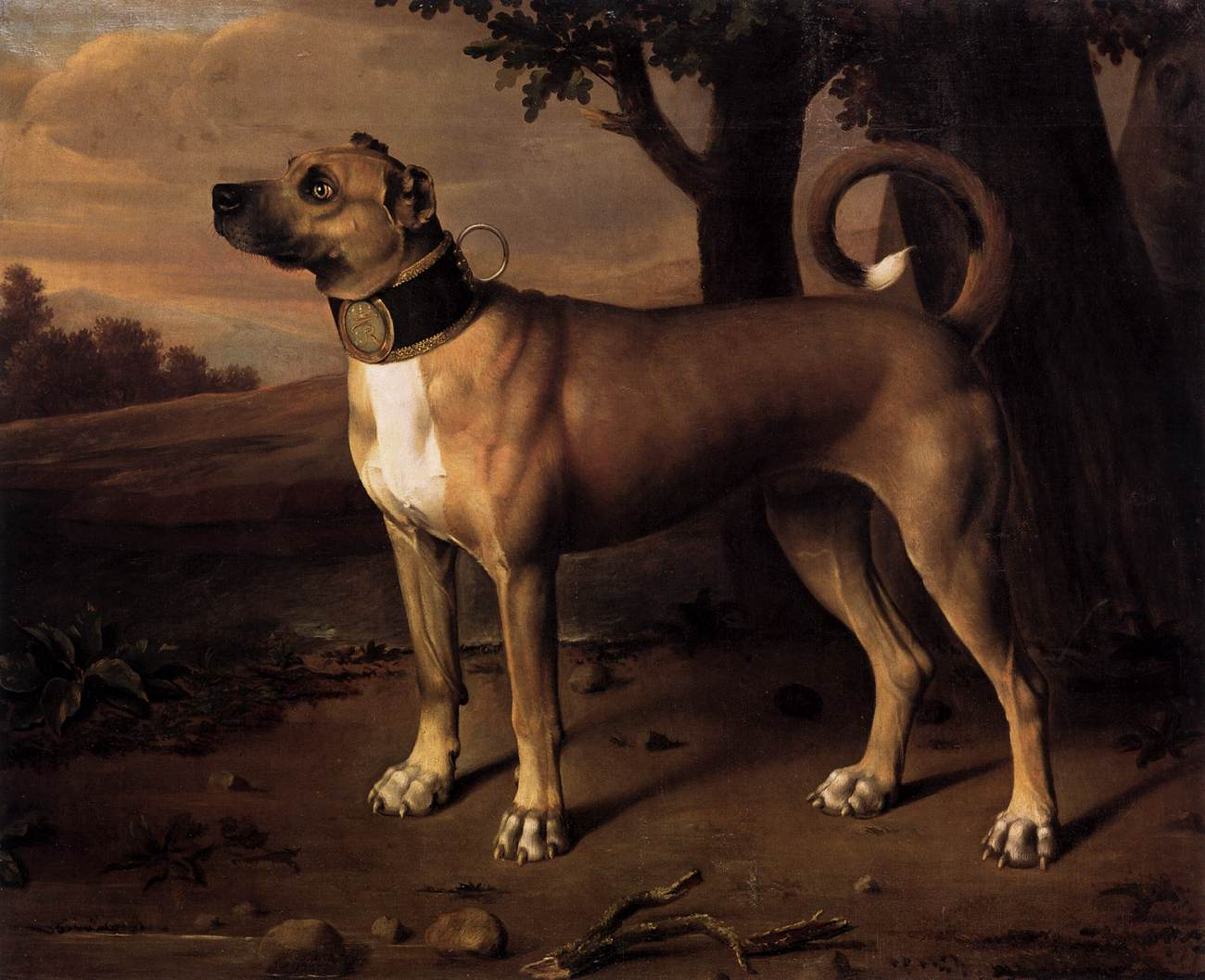
The Ulmer Mastiff

Johann Christof Merck, or Merk (before 1695, Schwäbisch Hall – after 1726, Potsdam) was a German painter who specialized in uniformed portraits and animals.

== Life and work ==
Very little is known about his origins. In 1786, the Berlin historian, Friedrich Nicolai, noted that his family background had not been handed down, nor was there any indication of where or with whom he may have received his artistic training. It is also unclear when or why he came from Swabia to Brandenburg.

In Berlin, after 1695, he worked at the Electoral Court. Under the reign of Elector Frederick III (later King Frederick I of Prussia), he created hunting scenes and animal paintings, including one of his best known works, the "Ulmer Mastiff" (1705), one of the King's favorite dogs. From 1717 he worked at the court of King Frederick William I in Potsdam.

There, he concentrated on portraits, including equestrian portraits of the King and the Margraves; Philip William and Christian Ludwig. The King, who was known as the "Soldatenkönig" (Soldier King), commissioned Merck to paint life-size portraits of all the members of his Prussian Infantry Regiment #6, called the "Langen Kerls" (Tall Guys) or, in English, the Potsdam Giants.

He also served as a Professor at the Prussian Academy of Arts.
