= Heathfield Park SSSI =

Protected area in East Sussex, England

Coordinates: 50.965°N 0.269°E

Heathfield Park
- Site of Special Scientific Interest
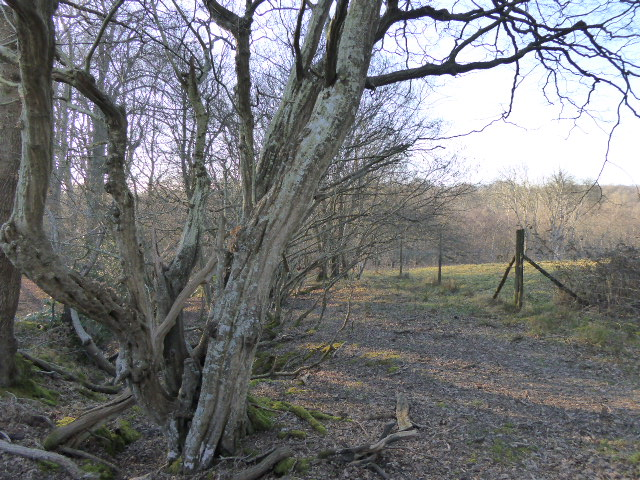
- Location of Heathfield Park.
- Area of search: East Sussex
- Grid reference: TQ 594 209
- Interest: Biological
- Area: 41.0 hectares (101 acres)
- Notification date: 1986
- Location map: Magic Map

Heathfield Park SSSI is a 41-hectare (100-acre) biological Site of Special Scientific Interest east of Heathfield in East Sussex. It is part of Heathfield Park, a Grade II* listed building and park.

This is a steep valley carved by a stream. The sheltered wooded habitat has a warm and moist microclimate and it has a number of plant species usually restricted to western Britain, such as Cornish moneywort, hay-scented buckler-fern and the liverwort Frullania tamarisci. The site is also important for lichens and 76 species have been recorded.

The site is private land with no public access.
