= The Harleian Miscellany =

1744–1753 collection of historical English pamphlets

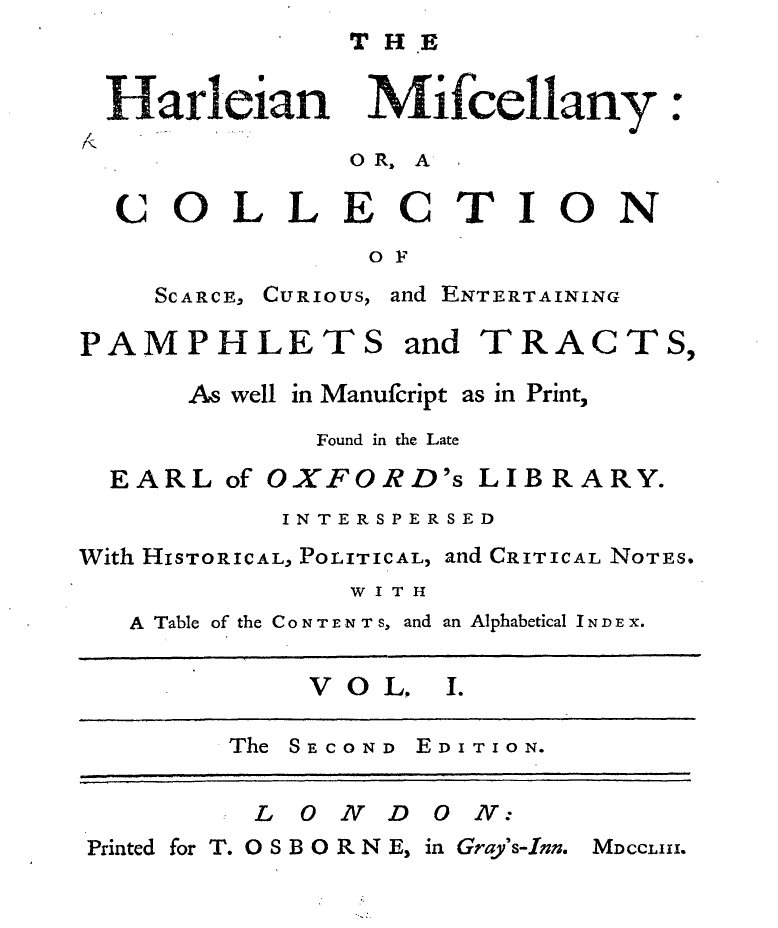
Title page from the second edition of Harleian Miscellany (1753)

The Harleian Miscellany is a collection of material from the library of the Earl of Oxford and Earl Mortimer collated and edited by Samuel Johnson and William Oldys between 1744 and 1753 on behalf of the publisher Thomas Osborne. Its subtitle was A Collection of Scarce, Curious, And Entertaining Pamphlets And Tracts, as well In Manuscript As In Print, Found In The Late Earl Of Oxford's Library, Interspersed With Historical, Political, And Critical Notes.

== Provenance ==
The "late Earl of Oxford" whose library was the source of the texts could refer either to Robert Harley, 1st Earl of Oxford and Earl Mortimer (died 1724), or to his son, Edward Harley, 2nd Earl of Oxford and Earl Mortimer (died 1741). A passage at the beginning of the first volume emphasizes the role of Robert Harley, the first earl, in the creation of the library:

There can be no Objection against the Prefixing the reasons for Creating the Right Honorable Robert Harley, Esq., a Peer of Great-Britain, and Earl of Oxford; especially, as the valuable Collection, intended to be published in this Form, was made by the Greatness of his Knowledge in all Branches of Learning, and at the vast Expence of that noble Family. ...his Library consisted of more than 100000 different Authors: He, I say, cannot be denied the first Place in this Miscellany, which esteems it an Honour to bear his Name.

Edward Harley, the second earl, who had died only a few years before The Harleian Miscellany was published, was also a bibliophile who had greatly expanded the library.
