= Francis Newbery (publisher) =

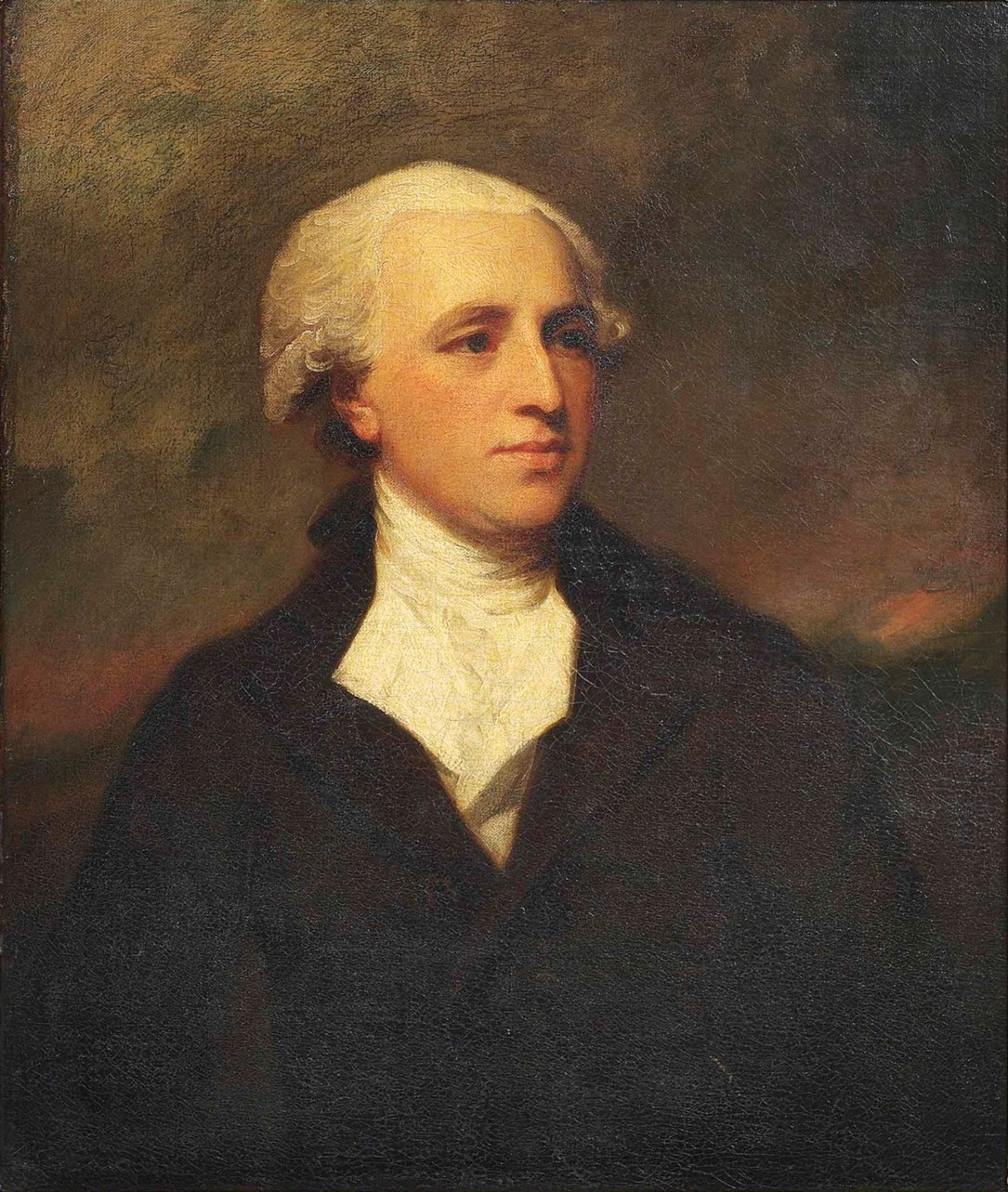
- painting by George Romney, 1783-1784.
- Born: 6 July 1743
- Died: 17 July 1818 (aged 75)
- Education: Merchant Taylors' School; Trinity College, Oxford; Sidney Sussex College, Cambridge
- Occupations: Publisher, businessman
- Spouse: Mary Raikes
- Father: John Newbery
- Relatives: Robert Raikes (father-in-law)

Francis Newbery (6 July 1743 – 17 July 1818) was an English publisher and businessman.

== Life ==
Born on 6 July 1743, he was the son of John Newbery, the publisher of St. Paul's Churchyard; alone of his brothers, he survived his father. After schooling at Ramsgate and Hoddesdon, Hertfordshire, he entered Merchant Taylors' School in 1758 and matriculated at Trinity College, Oxford, on 1 April 1762. Four years afterward he migrated to Sidney Sussex College, Cambridge, but he took no degree from either university.

On the death of his father in 1767, Newbery abandoned plans of a professional career on the advice of his father's friends Samuel Johnson and Robert James. He went into the business his father had created, both publishing and selling patent medicines. In 1779, he transferred the patent-medicine part of the business to the northeast corner of St. Paul's Churchyard, leaving the book publishing at the old spot. The firm was subsequently known as Newbery & Harris, for the partner John Harris (1756–1846); in 1865, it became Messrs. Griffiths & Farran.

Newbery, in 1791, purchased Heathfield Park, the estate of Lord Heathfield in Sussex. He died on 17 July 1818, aged 75.

== Works ==
Oliver Goldsmith died after overdosing on "James's fever powder", the patent of which belonged to Newbery. He published a statement on the case to defend the reputation of his medicine.

Newbery made translations from classical authors, particularly Horace. They are in the work Donum Amicis: Verses on various occasions by F. N., printed by Thomas Davidson, Whitefriars, 1815.

Verse written by Newbery was set to music by William Crotch and others. John Wall Callcott, a good friend, set as a glee Hail all the dear delights of home, a poem by Newbery.

== Family ==
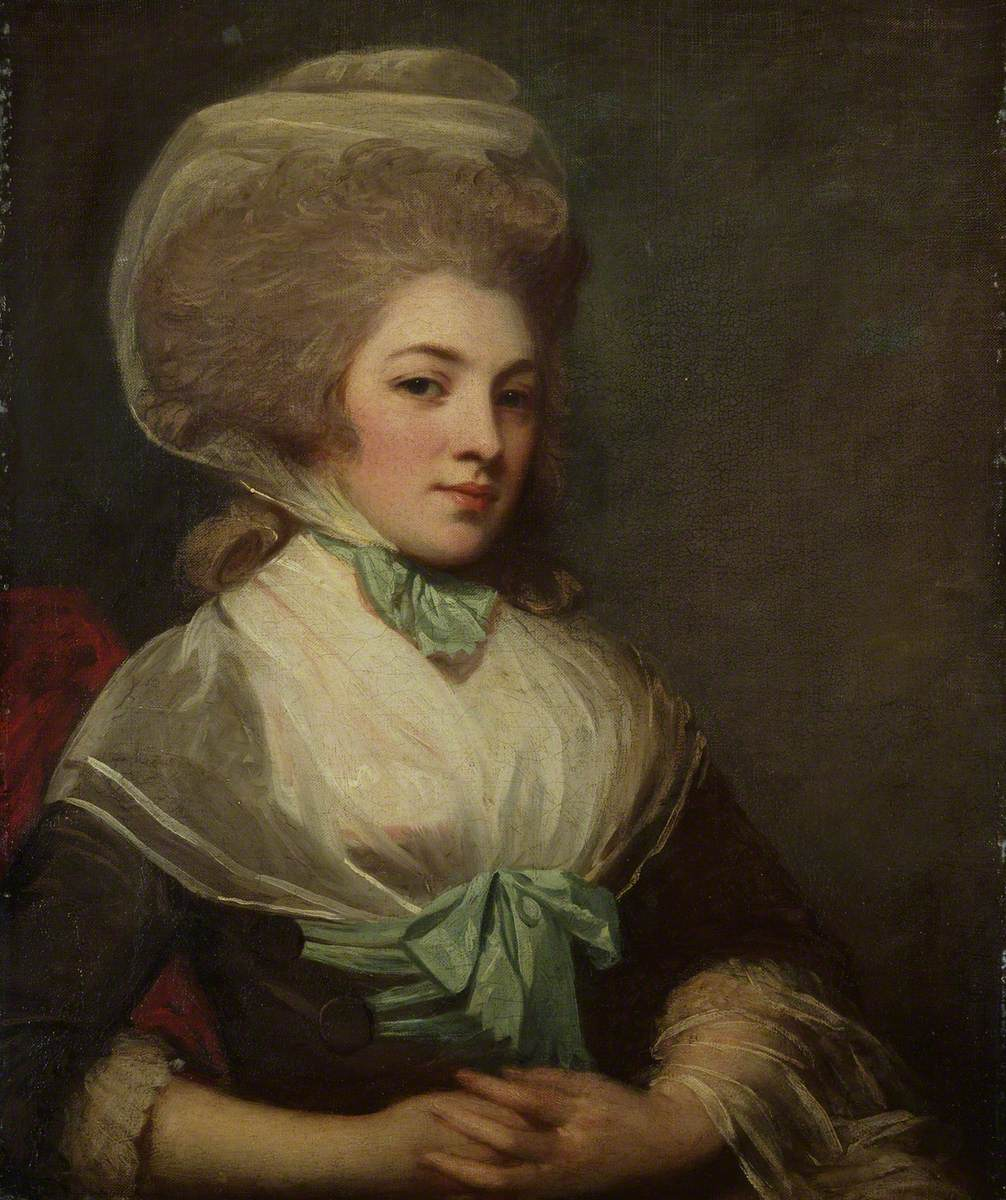
Mary Raikes, wife of Francis Newbery, painting by George Romney, 1782-1784.

Newbery married Mary, sister of Robert Raikes.

=== Cousin of the same name ===
Newbery must be distinguished from his first cousin, also Francis Newbery, of Paternoster Row, bookseller and publisher, and who was in business with John Newbery. This Francis Newbery was the original publisher of The Vicar of Wakefield. He also published the Gentleman's Magazine from 1767 till his death on 8 June 1780.

== Notes ==
Attribution

This article incorporates text from a publication now in the public domain: Lee, Sidney, ed. (1894). "Newbery, Francis". Dictionary of National Biography. Vol. 40. London: Smith, Elder & Co.
