= Tomás Ó Caiside =

Irish friar, soldier, and poet (c. 1709–1773)

Tomás Ó Caiside, aka An Caisideach Bán, (c. 1709 – 1773?), was an Irish friar, soldier, and poet.

== Biography ==
Ó Caiside's family was of Ulster stock, his parents settling in Drishacaun townland, parish of Kilmurry, Castleplunkett, County Roscommon. What is known of his life is told in Eachtra Thomáis Uí Chaiside ("The Adventures of Tomás Ó Caiside") which he wrote himself. Two surviving copies, one by his friend and contemporary Brian Ó Fearghail, are kept in the Royal Irish Academy and the British Museum.

He was dismissed from the friary of Ballyhaunis "on account of a bad senseless marriage" and spent the rest of his life travelling all over Ireland and Britain, as well as central Europe. In 1733 he served in the Duke of Berwick's regiment and was later pressed into the Prussian Army, where he encountered the Potsdam Giants, alongside fellow-Irishman James Kirkland.

He mentions having been in the Electorate of the Palatinate; the Black Forest; Sandhausen; Hanover; Prussia; Brunswick; Bristol; and Bideford.

His poems include:

- An Caisideach Bán
- Béal Átha hAmhnais
- Máire Bhéal Átha hAmhnais
- Faoisdin Uí Chaiside (Ó Caiside's Confession)
- Bríd Ní Bheirn
- An Bráithrín Buartha (The Troubled Friar)
