= Daniel Cajanus =

Swedish/Finnish giant

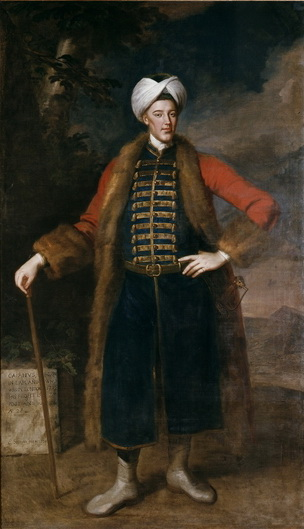
A portrait of Cajanus by Enoch Seeman.

Daniel Cajanus (1704 – 27 February 1749) was a Swedish-Finnish giant. He made his living by exhibiting himself for money, appearing in many European countries and attracting the interest of scientists and laypeople, including royalty. After his death, portions of his skeleton found their way into museums, where some parts still remain.

== Biography ==
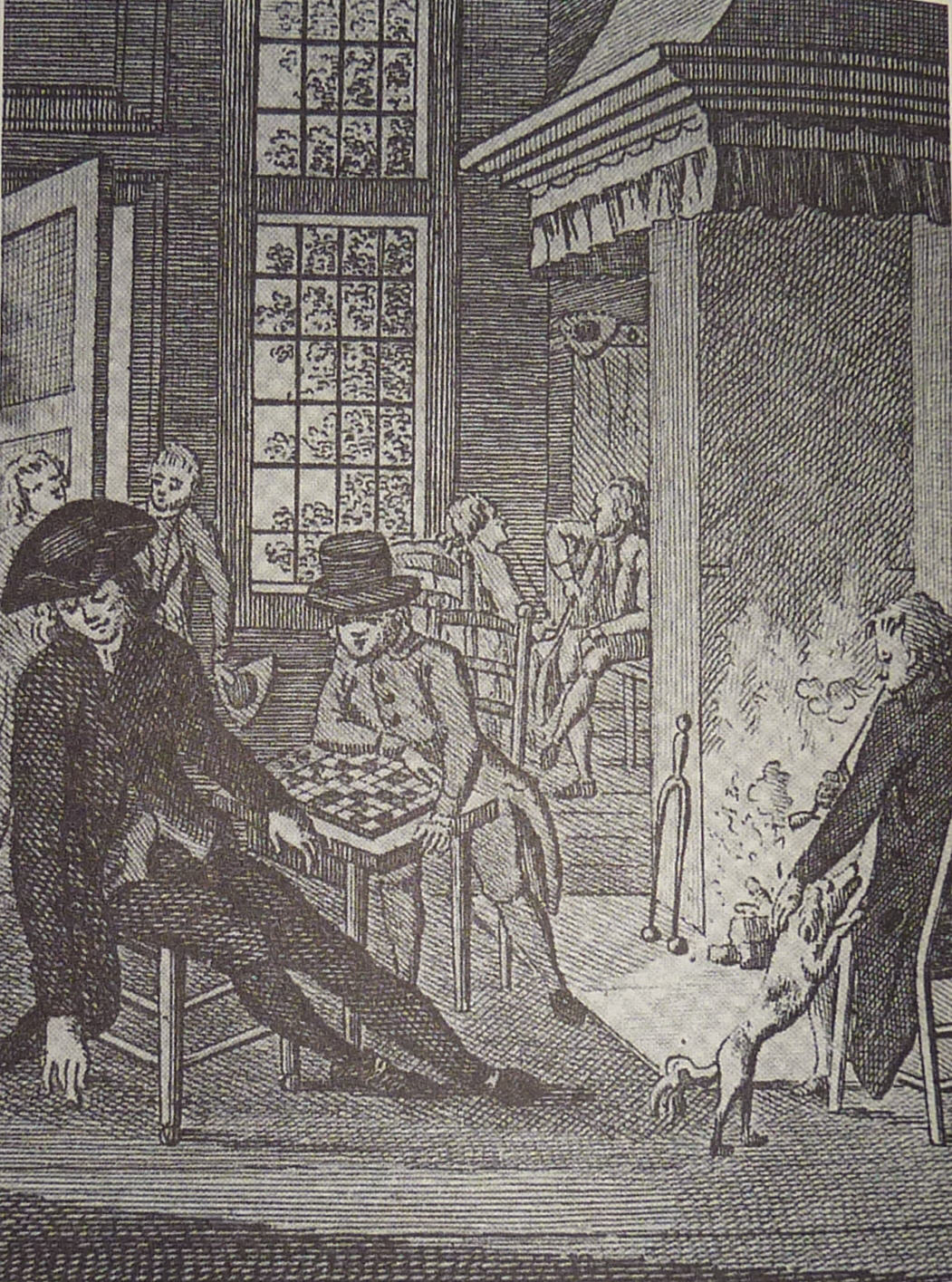
A contemporary engraving of Cajanus at the Blauw Jan inn.

Cajanus was born in Paltamo, Oulu, Swedish Finland, the son of a clergyman. His Latinized surname might have been derived from the name of the town of Kajaani or the region of Kainuu, which was also known by its Latin name "Cajania". Finland was at that time part of Sweden, and Cajanus was often referred to as the "Swedish Giant". Estimates of his adult height vary and range as high as 8 feet 1.4 inches (2.474 m). Jan Bondeson, a medical professional and author who has researched and written on Cajanus, suggests that his true height was around 7 feet 8 inches (2.34 m), supported by contemporaneous accounts in the London Annual Register. Various unconfirmed versions of his early life exist, but tax records indicate he may have left the country in 1723 or soon afterward, and Finnish and Swedish tradition recounts that he joined the bodyguard of Frederick William I of Prussia, which was composed of unusually tall soldiers and was nicknamed the Potsdam Giants.

Cajanus lived for some years at the court of August II of Poland, where he served as a cavalry soldier. Following the king's death in 1733 he appears to have moved on, and according to Theophilus Cibber spent time in Germany before arriving in London, where he is recorded as having appeared at Drury Lane in February 1734, playing the part of Gargantua in the pantomime Cupid and Psyche, and in several other productions. He exhibited himself for money in various places in London, billed as the "Swedish Giant". His portrait was painted twice during his stay in England by the artist Enoch Seeman; one of these portraits is now in the National Museum of Finland and depicts him in his Polish soldier's uniform, with an inscription stating his height as 7 feet 10 inches (2.39 m). In 1735 he traveled to Paris, where he exhibited himself to paying audiences and was received privately at Versailles by King Louis XV, the queen, and the dauphin. Later he took up residence in Amsterdam, where he lived from 1735 to 1741 as the guest of the landlord of the Blauw Jan, an inn where natural curiosities could be seen and traded. After an unsuccessful spell as a moneylender Cajanus returned to exhibiting himself, visiting England again in 1741 and 1742 and appearing before a meeting of the Royal Society, where his height was marked against a pillar and reported to be 7 feet 4 1/4 inches (224.2 cm) in his shoes. The society's president Martin Folkes observed that Cajanus appeared weak at this meeting, and could not stand for long.

The publisher Thomas Boreman met Cajanus during his visit to London in 1742 and produced a book purporting to be his biography. The History of Cajanus, the Swedish Giant, from his Birth to the Present Time was published on 23 September of that year, and advertisements for it encouraged the reader to visit the exhibition opposite the Mansion House where Cajanus himself could be seen.

== Netherlands ==
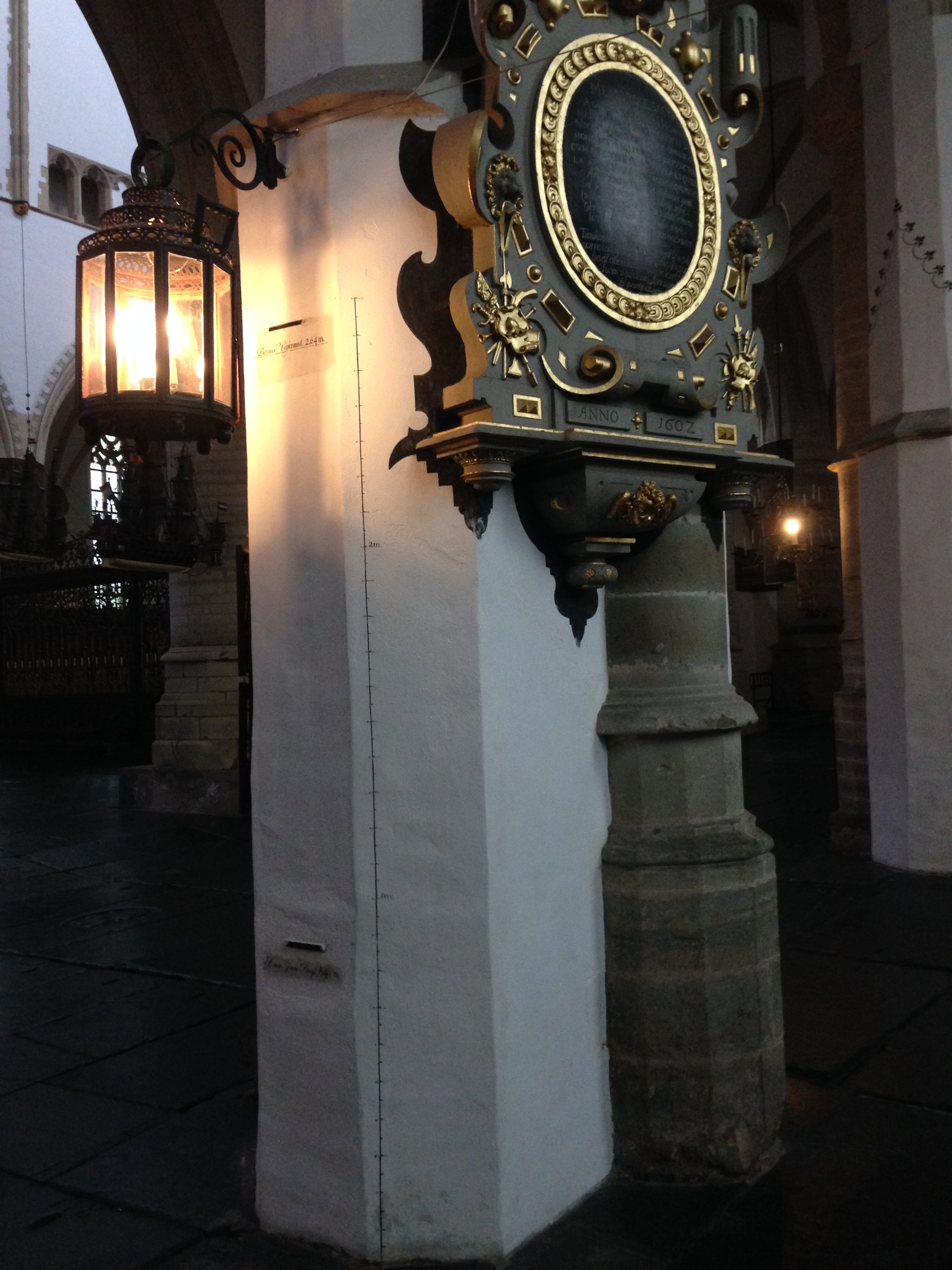
Pillar in the St. Bavochurch

Cajanus was quite popular in the Netherlands. In 1745 Cajanus settled in Haarlem, where he bought the right to live in the Proveniershuis, a sheltered housing unit that provided him with accommodation, meals and medical care. In the following years he wrote and published poetry and became a well-known figure in the town; a line marked on a pillar in the city's Grote Kerk still records his measured height during his residence there. This same pillar has a print now illustrating his exhibitions together with Simon Paap, a dwarf who died in December 1828. A life-size painting of him also hung in the church for centuries, but today hangs in the Haarlem city hall.

Cajanus died on 27 February 1749, leaving a large sum in his will to pay for a lavish funeral and a burial vault inside the Grote Kerk, with the intention of safeguarding his remains from disturbance. His coffin is said to have been 9 feet 7 inches (2.92 m) long. Despite his precautions, the vault was later sold, and Cajanus's bones were acquired by museums. Some are still held at the Museum of Anatomy in the University of Leiden. Today the Dutch language still remembers him with the slang term "Cajanus voeten", for unusually large feet. In period writings, the term "Cajaan" was used to mean a giant.

== Medical ==
Daniel Cajanus apparently suffered from gigantism caused by a defect of the pituitary, possibly combined with hypogonadism. This is indicated by the fact that Cajanus' bodily proportions, and especially his strikingly long arms, were consistent with those of eunuchs.

A tendency towards gigantism was displayed more broadly in his family. His sister Agneta, who went to Haarlem after his death to deal with his estate, was depicted as an especially large woman. A distant relative, Israel Cajanus, had extremely large hands and feet and thus probably also suffered from acromegaly.

The available information about Daniel Cajanus' actual size is somewhat variable; however it is clear that his height reduced somewhat over the course of his life. Investigations into his preserved bones reveal a phenomenon typical of gigantism which explains this reduction: the overproduction of growth hormone leads to a thickening of the cartilage, which wears away in the course of time, leading to symptoms similar to osteoarthritis. The condyles of his bones show clear signs of erosion, which also explain his difficulties in walking in his later years.
