= James Kirkland (giant) =

Irish soldier

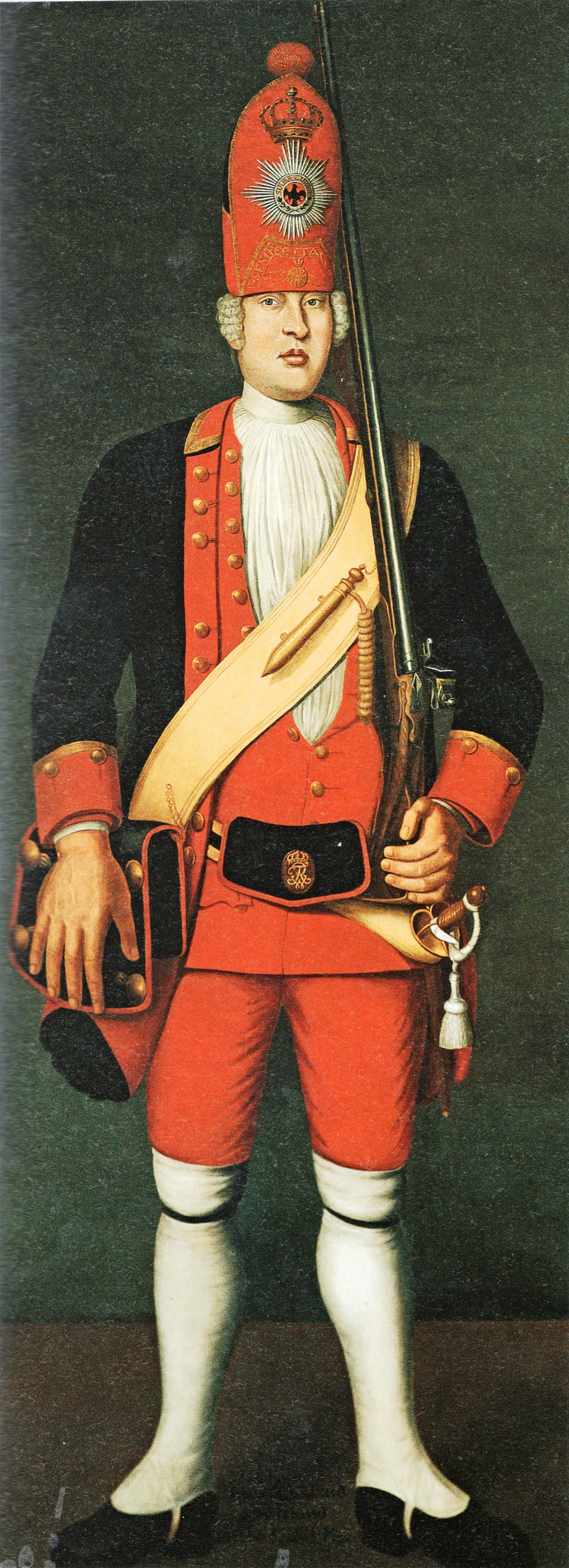
Possible portrait of Kirkland

James Kirkland (fl. 1730) was an Irish soldier who was conscripted into the Prussian Army to serve in the Potsdam Giants regiment due to his height. Kirkland was born in Ardagh, County Longford and by the time he came of age was known for his gigantism, being 217 cm or 7 feet 1 inches tall. He eventually made his way to England and found work as a footman.

In 1730, Kirkland was working in London as a footman of Caspar Wilhelm von Borcke, the Prussian ambassador to Great Britain. Borcke, not having a need for a footman and aware of Frederick William I of Prussia's fondness for tall soldiers, arranged for Kirkland to be forcibly taken on board a Prussian ship at Portsmouth and sent to Prussia. There, he was conscripted into the Prussian army's "Potsdam Giants", so nicknamed because it consisted solely of exceptionally tall soldiers.

The regiment never saw action during Frederick William I's reign as he was too fond of them to send the unit into combat. Instead, he trained and drilled them daily, along with displaying them to foreign visitors and dignitaries to impress them. Frederick William I also ordered the regiment to march in his bedroom whenever he was sick or depressed. There were several other Irishmen who allegedly served in the regiment alongside Kirkland, including the poet Tomás Ó Caiside. A portrait of Kirkland survives.
