= Thomas Boreman =

Pioneer English publisher (fl. 1730–1743)

- Occupation: publisher

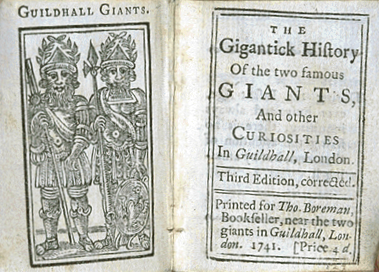
The Gigantic History of the Two Famous Giants

Thomas Boreman (fl. 1730–1743) was one of the earliest English children's book publishers particularly dealing with animals. His bookshops were located around London

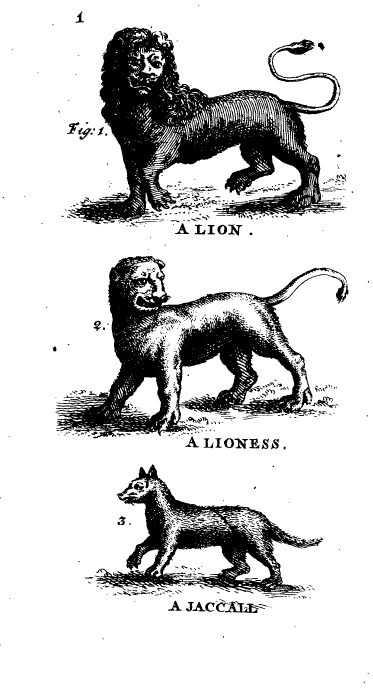
Illustration from Three Hundred Animals

Boreman published along with Richard Ware and Thomas Game from the 1730s. His Three Hundred Animals was the first, published ca 1730 and written for children. Boreman's earliest works included his 1740 Gigantick Histories, miniature books with illustrations and a list of subscribing readers, including the names of children as well as parents. He followed this two-volume publication with Curiosities in the Tower of London, with illustrations of animals in the Tower Zoo. His books were mainly compilations, often factually incorrect and printed with the aim of selling.

He published approximately a dozen titles. In 1742, he produced a book purporting to be the biography of Daniel Cajanus, The History of Cajanus, the Swedish Giant, from his Birth to the Present Time. Many of his books were based on Konrad Gesner's Historia animalium and some were inspired by Edward Topsell's Historie of Foure-Footed Beastes (1607). Boreman's work itself is thought to have inspired Buffon's publication of the Histoire naturelle (1749–88). The engraver Thomas Bewick had seen Boreman's book when he was a child and had been disappointed by the quality of woodcuts in them.

Boreman's stores were located at the corner of St Clement's Lane, two around Ludgate Hill, and one each near St Paul's and Guildhall.

Little is known of Boreman after 1744.

== Publications and quote ==
- Gigantick Histories of the Curiosities of London (1740–43)
- A Description of a Great Variety of Animals (1736)
- A Description of Some Curious and Uncommon Creatures, Omitted in the Description of Three Hundred Animals (1739)

From the preface to Gigantic History:

"During the Infant-Age, ever busy and always inquiring, there is no fixing the attention of the mind, but by amusing it."

== See also ==
- Mary Cooper, another early English children's book publisher
- John Newbery
