= Potsdam Giants =

Prussian regiment of tall soldiers

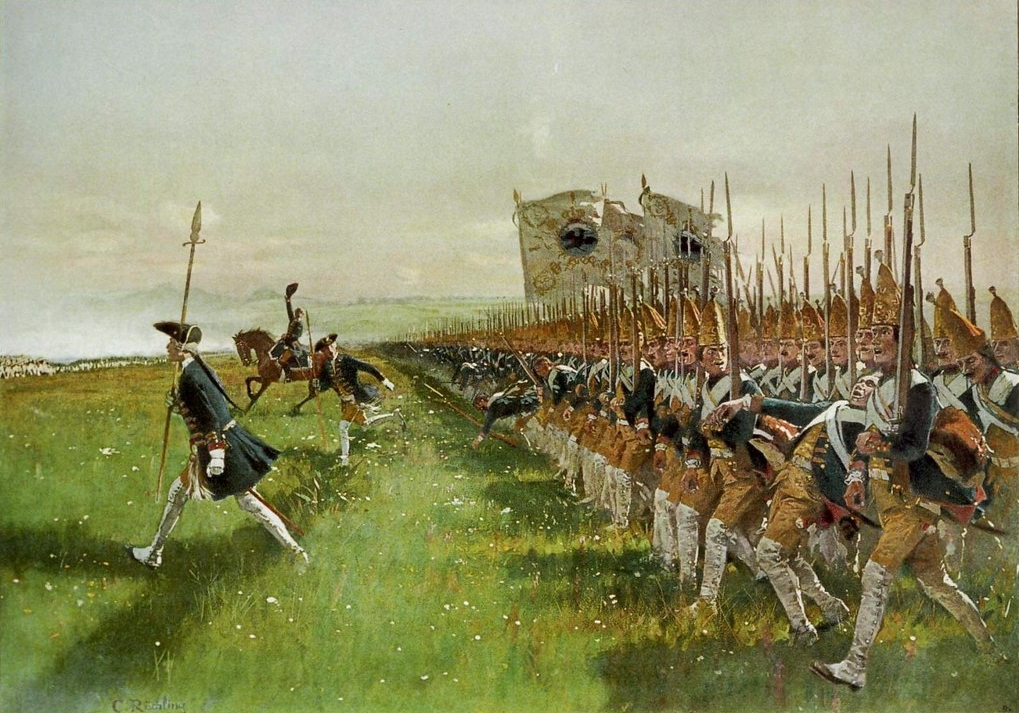
The Potsdam Giants at the Battle of Hohenfriedeberg, as depicted by Carl Röchling

The Potsdam Giants was the name given to Prussian infantry regiment No 6. The regiment was composed of taller-than-average soldiers, and was founded in 1675. It was eventually dissolved in 1806, after the Prussians were defeated by Napoleon. Throughout the reign of the Prussian king Friedrich Wilhelm I of Prussia (1688–1740), the unit was known as the "Potsdamer Riesengarde" ("giant guard of Potsdam") in German, but the Prussian population quickly nicknamed them the Lange Kerls ("long fellows").

== Regiment's history ==
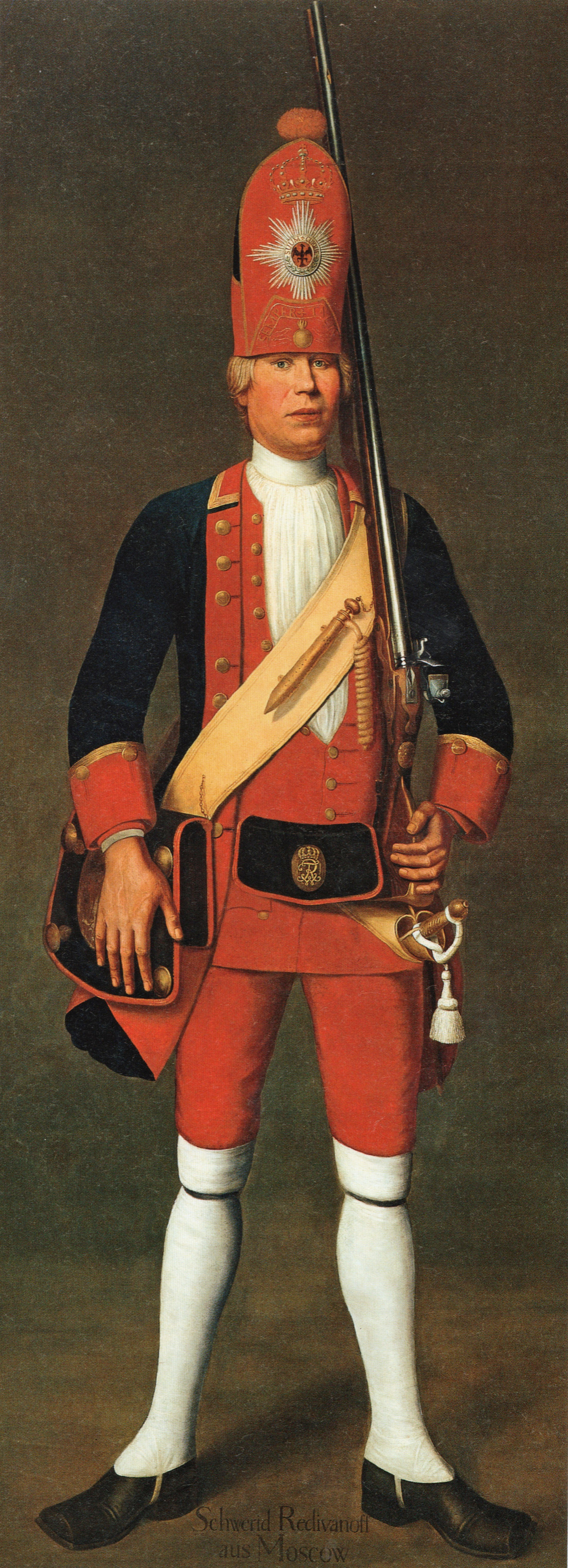
Prussian Langer Kerl by Johann Christof Merck, 1718

The Regiment was founded with a strength of two battalions in 1675 as “Regiment Kurprinz” under the command of Prince Frederick of Brandenburg, the later King Frederick I of Prussia. In 1688 the later King Frederick William I of Prussia became the nominal Commander of the Regiment. After Frederick William I ascended to the throne in 1713, he proceeded to strengthen his military, including hiring 40,000 mercenaries. He had already begun to recruit taller soldiers and needed several hundred more recruits each year.

As the number of tall soldiers increased, the regiment earned its nickname "Potsdam Giants". The original required height was 6 Prussian feet (about 6 ft 2 in or 1.88 m), well above average then and now. The king was about 1.60 m (5 ft 3 in) tall himself. He tried to obtain them by any means, including recruiting them from the armies of other countries. The Emperor of Austria, Russian Tsar Peter the Great and even the Sultan of the Ottoman Empire sent him tall soldiers in order to encourage friendly relations. Several soldiers were given by Tsar Peter I as a gift in return for the famous Amber Room. Pay was high, but not all giants were content, especially if they were forcibly recruited, and some attempted desertion or suicide.

Friedrich tried to pair these men with tall women, in order to breed giants. In The Descent of Man, Charles Darwin mentions this attempt as the only case of intentional selective breeding in humans: "Nor have certain male and female individuals been intentionally picked out and matched, except in the well-known case of the Prussian grenadiers; and in this case man obeyed, as might have been expected, the law of methodical selection; for it is asserted that many tall men were reared in the villages inhabited by the grenadiers with their tall wives."

Although Prussia briefly intervened in the Great Northern War, the Potsdam Giants never saw battle. Some sources state that there was a military reason to create a regiment of "long fellows" because loading a muzzleloader is easier to handle for a taller soldier. Another source states that many of the men were unfit for combat due to their gigantism.

The king trained and drilled his own regiment every day. He liked to paint their portraits from memory. He tried to show them to foreign visitors and dignitaries to impress them. At times he would try to cheer himself up by ordering them to march before him, even if he was in his sickbed. This procession, which included the entire regiment, was led by their mascot, a bear. Their uniform was not in any way unique for the time, consisting of a red mitre, a Prussian blue jacket with gold lacing, scarlet breeches and white gaiters.

One of the tallest soldiers, the Irishman James Kirkland, was reportedly 2.17 m (7 ft 1 1/2 in) in height. Kirkland's fellow Irishman, the poet Tomás Ó Caiside, also served in the regiment. Daniel Cajanus, the famous Swedish/Finnish giant, was also a member of the regiment.

When the king died in 1740, the regiment consisted of 3,200 men. However, his successor Frederick the Great did not share his father's sentiments about the regiment, which seemed to him an unnecessary expense. The regiment was largely disbanded and most of its soldiers were integrated into other units. The regiment itself was downgraded to a battalion (Garde – Grenadier No. 6) and employed during the War of the Austrian Succession at Hohenfriedberg in 1745 and at Rossbach, Leuthen, Hochkirch, Liegnitz, and Torgau throughout the Seven Years' War. The battalion surrendered near Erfurt and Prenzlau after the Prussian defeat at the Battle of Jena-Auerstedt in 1806 and was disbanded and absorbed into the 1st Guard Regiment of Foot.

== Bibliography ==
- J.N.W. Bos. 2000. Biography of Frederick William I the Soldier King of Prussia (1657-1713). Accessed 2007-10-03.
