= Mary Cooper (publisher) =

English publisher and bookseller (died 1761)

- Born: 1707
- Died: 5 August 1761 (aged 53–54)
- Occupations: Publisher and bookselller
- Years active: 1743–1761
- Known for: Earliest publisher of children's books in English
- Spouse: Thomas Cooper

Mary Cooper (1707 - 5 August 1761) was an English publisher and bookseller based in London who flourished between 1743 and 1761. With Thomas Boreman (fl. 1730–1743), she is the earliest publisher of children's books in English, predating John Newbery.

Cooper's business was on Paternoster Row. She was the widow of printer and publisher Thomas Cooper, whose business she continued. Thomas Cooper had published a reading guide in 1742, The Child's New Play-thing, and his wife published an edition of it after his death. Active from 1743 to 1761, she is notable especially for publishing Tommy Thumb's Pretty Song Book (1744), "the first known collection of English nursery rhymes in print". Cooper collected the rhymes, each of which had a companion woodcut, and later critics have remarked that "Cooper's ear for a good jingle was unerring".

Cooper was an exception to the perception that 18th-century women in the publishing business were of only minor importance. With her husband, she was a trade publisher, traditional publisher, and bookseller. She sometimes owned the copyright of what she sold but additionally appeared on title pages in the place of copyright owners to obscure ownership. This was a benefit for texts like the anonymously printed erotic novel A Secret History of Pandora's Box (1742). Cooper had business arrangements with Andrew Millar, Henry Fielding's publisher, and printed a number of Fielding's pamphlets. As a traditional publisher, she owned the copyright to "at least 18" titles. She is also credited with publishing a newspaper, the Manchester Vindicated, remarked on in 1749.

== See also ==
- List of women printers and publishers before 1800
