= John Cary (businessman) =

English merchant (1649–1722)

John Cary (1649–1722?) was a prominent Bristol merchant and writer on matters regarding trade during the eighteenth century. Cary has been heralded as a pioneer in establishing economics as a separate field of "scientific" inquiry, a proponent of a "favorable balance of trade", and an objector to the idea that low wages were desirable.

== Life and background ==
=== Early life ===
John Cary was born in Bristol, England. He was estimated to be born in March 1649 and is believed to have died sometime between 1717 and 1722, with the exact dates of his birth and death unknown. Cary was the eldest son of Mary Cary and Shershaw Cary. He descended from a family of merchants, and his father was a sugar trader in the Iberian Peninsula and West Indies. Cary also had a sixteenth-century namesake who was a merchant who traded contraband spices. While not much information is known about his formative years, he spent some of his late youth working as an apprentice to a linen draper.

=== Merchant ===
Cary became a merchant in 1672 and began his career dealing in goods and raw materials such as Caribbean sugar and Madeira wines. His merchant tradings led him to sail ships across the Atlantic, Caribbean, and Mediterranean.

By 1677, Cary joined the Bristol Society of Merchant Venturers and was promoted to become a warden in 1683. In the 1690s, he was named the Society's representative based in London where he advised London city members on the state of trade in Bristol and brought up matters of concern.

=== Religious views ===
Cary was a devout Anglican who served as a churchwarden for parishes in Bristol. He was active in pastoral movements and cited the Bible as a key influence that provided moral and economic knowledge, especially in regards to sanctifying labor.

He was against Catholicism because of his aversion to the idea of "arbitrary power" which was an association he linked with the Roman Catholic monarch, James II.

=== Political dealings ===
During the 1690s, Cary was an avid supporter of the Whigs Party members Sir Robert Yates and Major Thomas Day. His support led the opposition party, the Tories, to accuse him of treason for his encouragement of trade with France; however, Cary was able to defend himself against these accusations

Additionally, in 1698, Cary was a candidate for Parliament in Bristol.

=== Workhouses for the poor ===
Cary also promoted the establishment of workhouses for the poor. Described as the "philanthropic Bristol merchant", after recognizing the dire situation in Bristol in that there were over a thousand paupers who inhabited the city, he was inspired to build a workhouse where these individuals could "be compelled to maintain themselves". In 1697, he was the main organizer of the Bristol Corporation of the Poor which provided relief after the 1696 Poor Act in Bristol.

Cary described his vision for the workhouses as being:

"That a spacious workhouse be erected in some vacant place, within the city, on a general charge, large enough for the Poor, who are to be employed therein; and also with room for such, who, being unable to work, are to be relieved by charity."

At these workhouses, the poor would be provided with room, board, wages, and free education for poor women. In Cary's view, this establishment "won them into Civility, and a love to their Labour."

=== Views on Spain ===
In Cary's 1690s work Discourse on trade and other matters relative to it, he expounded a view on the Spaniards which was common amongst other economists of this time. He observed that during the seventeenth century, the Spanish seemed to be trailing behind other economic powerhouses in the world economy as Spain was not engaging in mercantile activities.

In Cary's opinion:

"Spaniards are stately People, not much given to Trade or Manufactures themselves ... other trading Nations, such as the English, French, Dutch and Genoese, take advantage of them."

Additionally, Cary believed that countries such as Spain were inferior because of their desire for foreign luxuries as this caused unemployment and encouraged vice. He believed that this is "why the Kingdom of Spain continues poor notwithstanding its Indies, because all that the Inhabitants buy is purchased for its full Value in Treasure or Product, their Labour adding nothing to its Wealth, for want of Manufactures."

=== Relationship with Ireland ===
In 1700, Cary was named as a trustee for a sale of forfeited estates in Ireland. He was invited by the English Parliament to oversee the Williamite confiscations in Ireland.

Cary was starkly against the economic growth of Ireland through its manufacturing sector. Cary feared that "the affairs of Ireland, whose Trade will in a short time eat up ours, except some stop be put to it, and this doth not more affect any place as much as this city." As a result, Cary believed that Ireland's role should be a colony of England and that it should not be allowed to develop local manufacturers. In fact, Cary advocated that the Irish production of wool should be destroyed and that raw wool would be banned from being sold in the market, otherwise the Irish would be able to undercut the English's prices in foreign markets. He saw Ireland's role in the global economy to be one which should revert to "Husbandry, Trade and Manufactures stand diametrically opposite thereto" and that the country should be reduced to a more primitive and less developed state.

=== Later life ===
During the later years of his life, Cary was jailed for a financial misdemeanor. He wrote his last work in 1718 titled Vindication of the Rights of Parliament from jail and later died in 1720.

== Influence ==
Because of his workings as a merchant, his experience in West Indian sugar trade fostered his interest in the political dealings of commercial matters. Cary was an advocate of social reform, signing his name to support petitions which ranged from reducing the duties on imported sugar to opening the slave trade to Bristol.

=== Main beliefs ===
- importance of civic virtue and a representative government
- dependency is intertwined with slavery
- moral and political paradigm of the common good
- faith in a citizen militia
- distrust of commerce
- Protestantism, parliamentarianism, militarism, commerce

=== Economics as a science ===
During the turn of the eighteenth century, Cary's writings and pamphlets incorporate more legal vernacular and elements of legal theory as he emphasized the idea of "proof" and "evidence". In the 1717 edition of the Essay, he revealed the need for economics to be a science in that "Trade hath its principles as other Science have." This conclusion arose from the fact that Cary had been a first-hand observer and participant in trade, which allowed him to conclude of the mechanisms which facilitated international trade. While Cary did not fully possess the knowledge and skill to cement economics as a science, Cary was appreciative of the "argumentative value of evidence" and experience based on "coercive rhetoric and factual logic".

== Essay on the state of England ==
In Cary's 1695 writing on the state of England, he propounded the path through which England could propagate national wealth through manufacturing and the presence of government intervention in the economic sector.

The context for his work was the Nine Years' War which occurred from 1688 to 1697. Cary both experienced and observed how the war had restricted England's treasure and as a result, his work acts as a guide for how countries could propagate wealth and overcome the obstacles of the preceding time.

During the eighteenth century, Cary's essay was translated into French, Italian, and German. Additionally government leaders and policy makers across Europe were influenced by his writings and his mercantilist ideas of the government playing a forefront role in governing and regulating everyday commerce in order to facilitate economic development.

The Essay covers three main topics: trade, the poor, and taxes.

=== On trade ===
Cary believed that the main purpose of countries engaging in trade was to produce competitive exports which would stimulate international competition rather than stimulate international cooperation.

Cary argued that the matter of importance was not the nature of trade but what commodities were traded. In fact, Cary believed that "inflows of bullion were merely symptomatic of a nation's healthy productive capacity" and that "real wealth being based on accumulated labor and technological developments."

In Cary's ideal vision, he saw England becoming an empire which rested on both economic and military prowess that imported raw materials and exported manufactured goods in order to keep "economic, artificial, and religious pretenders at bay."

Additionally, labor was more useful and benefited more from when it was applied in the manufacturing sector compared to the agricultural sector and this difference according to Reinhart's interpretation of Cary's essay, "helped win wars, encouraged navigations, and, most important, offered a possibility for material and social amelioration, increasing workers' wages and moral rectitude while allowing them to remain competitive in foreign markets."

=== On the poor ===
On the subject of the poor, Cary advocated for the creation of workhouses for the poor where they could be "assistants to the Manufactures than such themselves" which would result in the "idle" being whipped into shape and the "drones of society put to work in the very luxurious industries that had corrupted them in the first place." This process would result in the Poor coming "by use to be in Love with Labour." They could then be put to work in apprentices which necessitated greater skill and training, thereby increasing their wages and well-being.

=== On taxes ===
Cary believed the purpose of tariffs in the international marketplace was to facilitate long-term industrial development rather than fiscal relief.

On the subject of financial reform, Cary's works largely overlook the problems of public debt redemption. Only in a later work towards the end of his life did Cary offer the suggestion of tying the peoples' money to the public debt via an institution of a reformed national bank.

== Other works ==
- A Discourse Concerning the East-India Trade: Shewing it to be Unprofitable to the Kingdom of England: Being Taken Out of an Essay on Trade, 1695
- An Essay Towards the Settlement of a National Credit in the Kingdom of England: Humbly Presented to the Two Honourable Houses of Parliament, 1696
- A Discourse Concerning the Trade of Ireland and Scotland, as They Stand in Competition with the Trade of England, 1696
- An Essay on the Coin and Credit of England as They Stand with Respect to Its Trade, 1696
- A Vindication of the Parliament of England: In Answer to a Book, Written by William Molyneux of Dublin, Esq. Intituled, The Case of Irelands Being Bound by Acts of Parliament in England, Stated, 1698
- Essay on the Registry for the Tithes of Land, 1698
- On the Linen Trade in Ireland, 1698
- An Account of the Proceedings of the Corporation of Bristol, in execution of the Act of Parliament for the better employing the poor of that City, 1700
- Some Considerations relating to the linen manufacture in the Kingdom of Ireland, 1704
- A Proposal Offered to the Committee of the Honourable House of Commons Appointed to Consider of Ways for the Better Providing for the Poor and Setting Them on Work, 1700
- An account of the proceedings of the Corporation of Bristol in execution of the act of Parliament for the better employing and maintaining the poor of that city, 1700
- A Discourse of the Advantage of the African Trade to this Nation, 1712
- An Essay Towards Regulating the Trade, and Employing the Poor of this Kingdom, 1717
- The rights of the commons in Parliament assembled asserted and the liberties of the people vindicated, 1718
- A proposal for paying off the publick debts by erecting a national credit, 1719
- A Discourse on Trade, and Other Matters Relative to it, 1745

== Relationship with John Locke ==
During the end of the seventeen century, particularly after Cary published An Essay on the State of England, he began to develop a friendship with fellow Englishman John Locke via the correspondence of letters.

Locke is shown to express sincere approbation for Cary's writings, stating that "I think you have hit the mark ... 'Tis the balance of our trade with foreign countries, not altering the standard of our coin, which increases or lessens our bullion at home...".

Additionally, Locke is thought to have regarded Cary's Essay highly, seeing truth and honesty inherent in his works. In one exchange, Locke wrote to Cary that: "I see no party or interest you contend for but that of truth and your country".

In another exchange, also regarding Cary's Essay, Locke wrote a profound commendation:

"It is the best discourse I ever read on that subject.

Not only for the clearness of all that you deliver, and the undoubted evidence of most of it, but for a reason that weighs with me more than both those, and that is that sincere aim of the public good and that disinterested reasoning that appears to me in all your proposals; a thing that I have not been able to find in those authors on the same argument which I have looked into. The country gentleman, who is most concerned in a right ordering of trade, both in duty and interest, is of all others the most remote from any true notions of it or sense in his stake in it.

'Tis high time somebody should awaken and inform him, that he may in his place look a little after it.".

Additionally, the two exchanged quips of banter and critique. Cary has been noted of pointing out the flaws in Locke's calculation of exchange rates while Locke pointed out Cary's poor usage of Latin grammar.

== Legacy ==
=== Discussions on Machinery ===
Cary's 1695 A Discourse on Trade is cited as having one of the "earliest explicit discussions of machinery". Cary, an advocate of the use of machinery to enhance the manufacturing sector and thereby create economic growth, wrote that England gained a competitive advantage over other competitors because of the innovation of English manufacturers.

"Tobacco is cut by Engines: Books are printed; Deal Boards are sawn with Mills; Lead is smelted by Wind Furnaces; all which save the Labour of many Hands, so the Wages of those employed need not be fallen ... New Projections are every Day set on Foot to render the making our Woollen Manufacturers easy, which should be rendered cheaper by the Contrivance of the Manufacturers, not by falling the Price of Labour; Cheapness creates Expence, and gives fresh Employments, whereby the Poor will be still kept at Work" (pg. 99–100)

=== Reinert on Cary ===
Sophus Reinert, a historian at Harvard Business school, wrote about Cary's An Essay on the State of England in his 2011 book, Translating Empire: Emulation and the Origins of Political Economy. In Reinert's publication, he traced the economic translations between 1500 and 1849 to understand England's nationalistic policies during the eighteenth century and to ultimately explain the dynamics of political economy during this time period. Cary's 1695 work on Essay on the State of England has been described as "the forgotten book that helped shape the modern economy."

== See also ==
- East India Company
- John Locke
- Mercantilism
- Political economy
