= Thomas Evans (bookseller, born 1739) =

Welsh bookseller and publisher in 18th century London (1739–1803)

Thomas Evans (1739–1803) was a Welsh bookseller and publisher in 18th century London, one of two of the same name.

== Career ==
Evans was born in Wales in 1739, and began his working life in London as a bookseller's porter with a William Johnston of Ludgate Street. He went on to become the publisher of the Morning Chronicle and the London Packet as well as taking over the bookselling business of Messrs. Hawes, Clarke, & Collins, based at no. 32 Paternoster Row.

== Goldsmith case ==
In 1773, nine days after the first performance of the play 'She Stoops to Conquer', the London Packet published an article about the play's author, Oliver Goldsmith, and a Miss Horneck, the so-called "Jessamy bride". Holding Evans responsible for the article, Goldsmith attacked him in the Paternoster Row shop. Goldsmith was charged with assault, and ordered to pay £50 to a Welsh charity.

== Family and personal life ==
Evans was separated from his wife, partly over disagreement over their only son. The latter married in 1790, but deserted his family and went to America, later returning to die in poverty eighteen months before his father. Evans died on 2 July 1803 at his lodgings in Chapter House Court, at the age of sixty-four, after a short illness. He left the bulk of his large fortune to an old friend, Christopher Brown, formerly assistant to Mr. Longman of Paternoster Row, and father of the Thomas Brown who afterwards became a member of the famous firm.
