= 1835 in literature =

This article contains information about the literary events and publications of 1835.

== Events ==
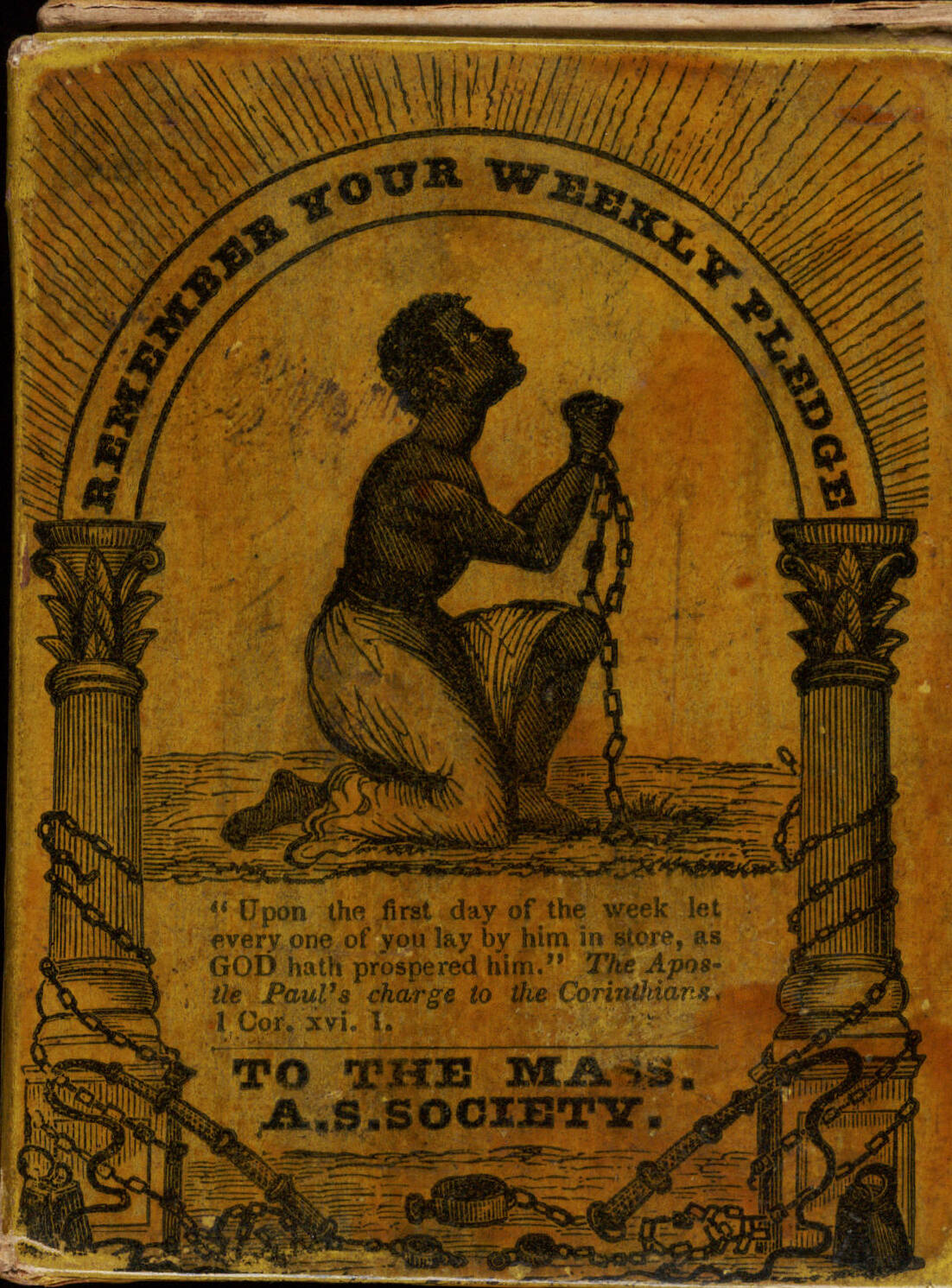
Remember Your Weekly Pledge, collection box for Massachusetts Anti-Slavery Society. Set aside in the home, the box was designed to remind members to make their weekly contribution. Circa 1850

- January 21 – The abolitionist school teacher Susan Paul officiates at a meeting of the New England Anti-Slavery Society (NEASS) in Boston. Later in the year, her Memoir of James Jackson becomes the earliest-known published narrative by an African-American woman and the first account documenting the life of a free black child in the United States.
- February 17 – William Colenso prints the first book in New Zealand, a translation into the Māori language of the Epistle to the Philippians and the Epistle to the Ephesians.
- February 28 – The Finnish language epic poetry Kalevala, compiled by Elias Lönnrot from oral sources, is first published in the Grand Duchy of Finland, becoming influential in the Fennoman movement.
- c. early March – John Stuart Mill's maid accidentally burns the unpublished first volume manuscript of Thomas Carlyle's The French Revolution: A History.
- May 8 – The first of Hans Christian Andersen's 168 fantastic stories are published as Fairy Tales Told for Children. First Collection (Eventyr, fortalte for Børn) by C. A. Reitzel in Copenhagen, including "The Tinderbox" ("Fyrtøiet") and "The Princess and the Pea" ("Prinsessen paa Ærten"). On December 16 a second collection including "Thumbelina" ("Tommelise") is published.
- July – Bertelsmann is founded by Carl Bertelsmann as a religious printer and publisher in Prussia.
- November/December – The German Federal Convention prohibits circulation of work by members of the "Young Germany" group of writers (Karl Gutzkow, Heinrich Heine, Heinrich Laube, Theodor Mundt and Ludolf Wienbarg) and the exiled poet Heinrich Heine.
- unknown dates
  - The annual Icelandic language journal Fjölnir is first published in Copenhagen by four Icelanders, Jónas Hallgrímsson, Konráð Gíslason, Brynjólfur Pétursson and Tómas Sæmundsson (the Fjölnismenn), promoting romanticism in Icelandic literature and the Icelandic independence movement.
  - The remains of Jonathan Swift are uncovered during work on St Patrick's Cathedral, Dublin, and inspected by William Wilde, an apprentice surgeon at this time.

== New books ==
=== Fiction ===
- Martin Archer Shee – Harry Calverley
- Honoré de Balzac -
  - Le Contrat de mariage
  - Séraphîta
  - Père Goriot
  - "La Fille aux yeux d'or" (The Girl with the Eyes of Gold)
- Edward Bulwer-Lytton
  - Rienzi
  - The Student
- Théophile Gautier – Mademoiselle de Maupin
- Nikolai Gogol
  - Arabesques (short story collection), including "Diary of a Madman" and "The Portrait"
  - Mirgorod (short story collection), including "The Tale of How Ivan Ivanovich Quarreled with Ivan Nikiforovich" and "Taras Bulba"
- Karl Gutzkow – Wally die Zweiflerin (Wally the Sceptic)
- Joseph C. Hart – Miriam Coffin, or The Whale-Fisherman
- Nathaniel Hawthorne
  - The Devil in Manuscript
  - "Young Goodman Brown" (short story)
- Washington Irving – The Crayon Miscellany (three short stories), including "A Tour on the Prairies"
- Hannah Maria Jones – The Gipsy Mother, or, The miseries of enforced marriage: a tale of mystery
- John P. Kennedy – Horseshoe Robinson
- Prosper Mérimée – "La Vénus d'Ille" (short story)
- Hugh Miller – Scenes and Legends in the North of Scotland
- Mary Russell Mitford – Belford Regis
- Caroline Norton – The Wife, and Woman's Reward
- Julia Pardoe – The Mardens and the Daventrys
- Edgar Allan Poe
  - Berenice
  - Morella
- G. W. M. Reynolds – The Youthful Impostor
- Catharine Maria Sedgwick – The Linwoods
- Mary Shelley – Lodore
- Frances Milton Trollope – Tremordyn Cliff
- Alfred de Vigny – Servitude et grandeur militaires

=== Children and young people ===
- Hans Christian Andersen
  - Fairy Tales Told for Children. First Collection. First Booklet (Eventyr, fortalte for Børn. Første Samling. Første Hefte) comprising "The Tinderbox" ("Fyrtøiet"), "Little Claus and Big Claus" ("Lille Claus og store Claus"), "The Princess and the Pea" ("Prindsessen paa Ærten") and "Little Ida's Flowers" ("Den lille Idas Blomster")
  - Fairy Tales Told for Children. First Collection. Second Booklet (Eventyr, fortalte for Børn. Første Samling. Andet Hefte) comprising "Thumbelina" ("Tommelise"), "The Naughty Boy" ("Den uartige Dreng") and "The Traveling Companion" ("Reisekammeraten")
  - The Improvisatore (Improvisatoren)
- Edward Augustus Kendall
  - Burford Cottage and Its Robin Red Breast
  - The English Boy at the Cape: An Anglo-African Story
- Jane Marcet – Mary's Grammar
- Frederick Marryat – The Pacha of Many Tales
- Agnes Strickland – Tales of the School Room

=== Drama ===
- Georg Büchner – Danton's Death (Dantons Tod, published)
- Christian Dietrich Grabbe – Hannibal
- Victor Hugo – Angelo, Tyrant of Padua (Angelo, tyran de Padoue)
- Friedrich Kaiser – Hans Hasenkopf
- William Thomas Moncrieff – The Jewess
- John Neal — Our Ephraim, or The New Englanders, A What-d’ye-call-it?–in three Acts
- John Oxenford
  - My Fellow Clerk
  - Twice Killed
  - A Day Well Spent (1-act)
- Thomas Noon Talfourd – Ion
- Alfred de Vigny – Chatterton

=== Poetry ===
- Robert Browning – Paracelsus
- Elias Lönnrot (comp.) – Kalevala
- Karl August Nicander – Hesperider
- See also 1835 in poetry

=== Non-fiction ===
- Edward Blyth – "An Attempt to Classify the 'Varieties' of Animals..." (first of three articles up to 1837)
- Maria Callcott – Little Arthur's History of England
- Benjamin Disraeli – The Vindication of the English Constitution
- James Cowles Prichard – Treatise on Insanity and Other Disorders Affecting the Mind
- Alexis de Tocqueville – Democracy in America, vol. 1
- David Strauss – Das Leben Jesu, kritisch bearbeitet (The Life of Jesus, Critically Examined; publication begins)
- Connop Thirlwall – History of Greece (publication begins)
- Elisabeth Vigee-Lebrun – Souvenirs (autobiography)

== Births ==
- January 20 – Lucy Hamilton Hooper, American writer (died 1893)
- January 29 – Sarah Chauncey Woolsey (Susan Coolidge), American children's writer (died 1905)
- February 14 – Mary Spear Nicholas Tiernan, American writer (died 1891)
- February 22 – Lillian Spender (née Headland), English novelist (died 1895)
- March 25 – Minnie S. Davis, American author and mental scientist (died 1927)
- March 28 – Mary H. Gray Clarke, American writer (died 1892)
- April 3 – Harriet Elizabeth Prescott Spofford, American writer (died 1921)
- April 10 – Charlotte Louisa Hawkins Dempster, Scottish novelist and essayist (died 1913 in literature)
- April 10 – Louise Chandler Moulton, American writer and critic (died 1908)
- April 25 – Emma Scarr Booth, English-born American author (died 1927)
- May 3 – Maria I. Johnston, American author, journalist, editor and lecturer (died 1921)
- May 8 – Augusta Jane Evans, American author (died 1909)
- June 5 – Amanda Kerfstedt, Swedish novelist and playwright (died 1920)
- June 10 – Florence Anderson Clark, American author, newspaper editor, librarian, and university administrator (died 1918)
- June 26 – Thomas W. Knox, American journalist and travel writer (died 1896)
- June 29 – Celia Laighton Thaxter, American writer (died 1894)
- July 1 (probable year) – Mary Catherine Chase (Sister Mary Francis de Sales), American nun and writer (died c. 1905)
- July 18 — Annie Russell Wall, American historian, writer, teacher (died 1920)
- October – Emilia Marryat, English children's writer (died 1875)
- October 4 – Mary Elizabeth Braddon, English novelist (died 1915)
- November – Shoqan Walikhanov, Russian Kazakh historian and folklorist (died 1865)
- November 30 – Mark Twain (Samuel Langhorne Clemens), American novelist and humorist (died 1910)
- December 4 – Samuel Butler, English novelist (died 1902)
- unknown date — Henrietta Gould Rowe, American litterateur and author (died 1910)

== Deaths ==
- January 1 – Mátyás Godina, Hungarian hymnist and educational writer in Prekmurje dialect of Slovenian (born c. 1768)
- March 30 – Richard Sharp ("Conversation Sharp"), English poet, critic and wit (born 1759)
- April 8
  - Wilhelm von Humboldt, German philosopher (born 1767)
  - Mary Rolls, English poet (born 1775)
- April 2 – István Ballér (Števan Baler), Slovene hymnist and Lutheran minister (born 1760)
- April 17 – William Henry Ireland, English poet and forger of Shakespeariana (born 1775)
- June 18 – William Cobbett, English journalist and social commentator (born 1763)
- August 23 – Isaac Pocock, English dramatist (born 1782)
- December 17 – Pierre Louis Roederer, French politician, economist, and historian (born 1754)
- December 25 – Antoine Ó Raifteirí, Irish poet writing in Gaelic (born 1779)
