= Viy =

Viy or VIY may refer to:

- Вий or "Viy" (story), Russian horror novella by Nikolai Gogol published 1835
- Numerous derivative works, among those listed at Viy (story)#Film adaptations being:
  - Viy (1909 film), a 1909 Russian lost film
  - Viy (1967 film), based on the Nikolai Gogol story
  - Viy (2014 film), a dark fantasy film inspired by Gogol story
  - Viy 2: Journey to China, a sequel to the 2014 film
- Viy (band), a Ukrainian band
- Viy, Azerbaijan, a village in Lankaran Rayon
- Vélizy-Villacoublay Air Base (IATA: VIY), Villacoublay, France
