= Constantin Kousnetzoff =

Russian painter

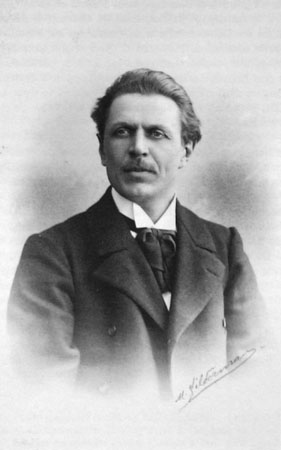
Constantin Kousnetzoff (1900)

Constantin Kousnetzoff, or Konstantin Pavlovich Kuznetsov (Russian: Константин Павлович Кузнецов); (10 August 1863, Zhyolnino - 30 December 1936, Paris) was a Russian painter who spent most of his career in France; known primarily for his landscapes, cityscapes and Symbolist watercolors.

== Biography ==
He was born to a wealthy merchant family who owned a trading business with headquarters in Astrakhan. He was educated at home, where he learned to play the piano and the flute. His interest in painting was inspired by the time he spent in the countryside, and his first works were in imitation of Ivan Shishkin.

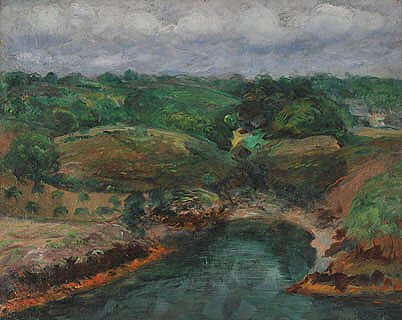
The River Bélon at Kerfany-les-Pins

Around 1892, he entered an art academy in Saratov. There, he met Victor Borisov-Musatov and, in 1895, accompanied him to Paris, where they both worked in the studios of Fernand Cormon. In 1899, he returned home just long enough to get married, then settled in Paris in 1900. At that time, he became an assistant to Ferdinand Humbert. His wife, Alexandra, studied at the Académie Julian.

That same year, he began making frequent trips to Brittany and Normandy, where he produced over 150 coastal scenes, and became associated with the Barbizon school (which he had first encountered in Saratov); frequently painting with Jean Peské, who was also a Russian emigrant.

He continued to exhibit in Moscow and Saint Petersburg and, from 1905, was a member of the "Moscow Association of Artists". In 1909, he designed sets and scenery for a production of Pelléas et Mélisande by the Opéra-Comique, but they were never used.

After 1927, he never left Paris; working along the Seine in Summer and in his studio the rest of the year. During this time, his style began to depart from Impressionism, with a darker palette and sharper contrasts. In the 1930s, he turned to creating illustrations; notably for a special, numbered French-language edition of Viy by Nikolai Gogol. His illustrations for several works by Pushkin were never published.

After his eldest son died in 1933, his health began to decline and he died three years later. Major retrospectives of his work were held in Paris in 1937, the 1960s, and 1987.

== Artist's legacy ==
Kuznetsov's works are in many museum collections, including the State Tretyakov Gallery and the Russian Museum, and abroad, at the Musée d'Orsay and the Carnival Museum in Paris, the Pont-Aven and the Hague Municipal Museum.

After the artist's death retrospective exhibitions of his works were held in Paris in 1937, 1964, 1965 and 1966.

In 2021 the first large-scale exhibition of Konstantin Kuznetsov's works in Russia was held at the Tretyakov Gallery.

== Selected paintings ==
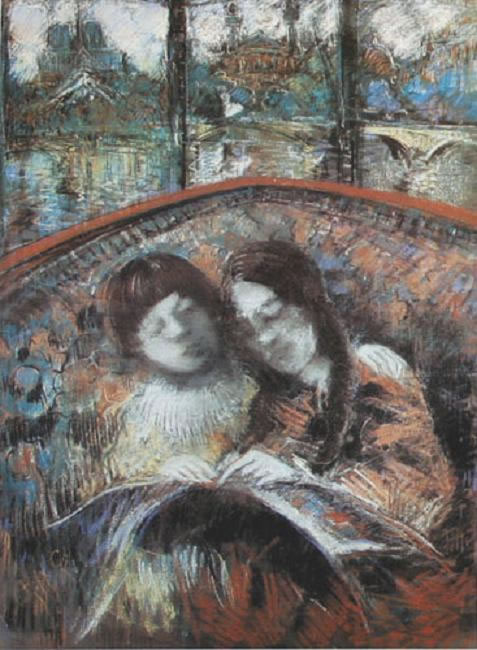
The Artist's Daughters

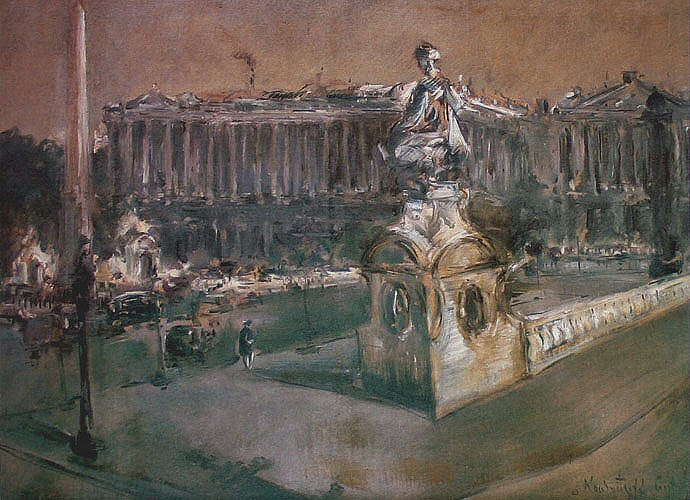
Place de la Concorde

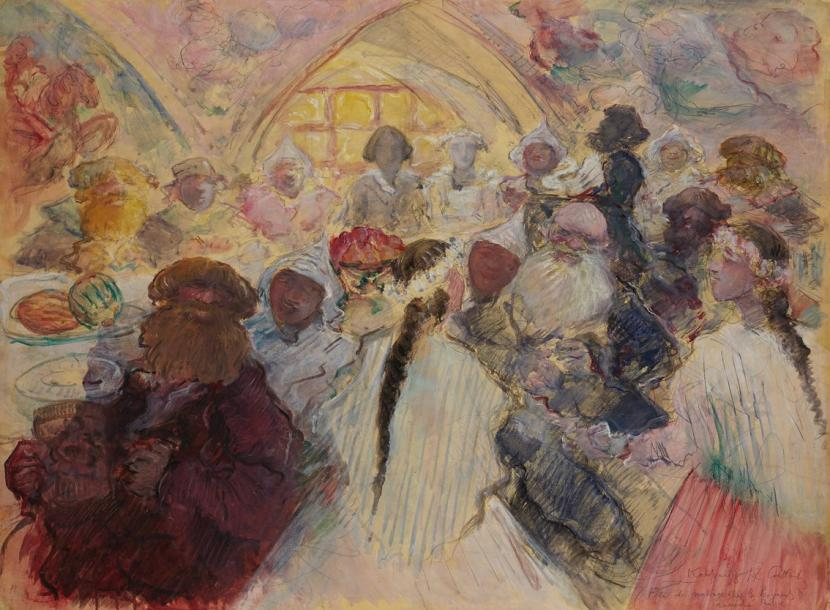
Wedding Party

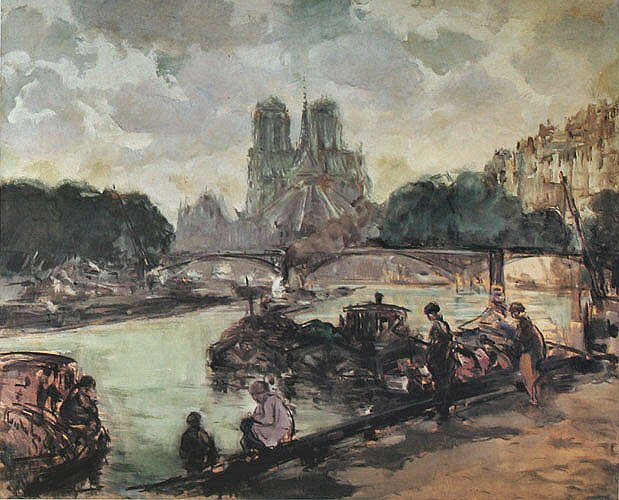
Bright Morning at
Notre-Dame de Paris
