= Emma Booth =

Emma Booth may refer to:

- Emma Booth (actress) (born 1982), Australian model-turned-actress
- Emma Booth (equestrian) (born 1991), Australian Para-equestrian rider
- Emma Booth (The Salvation Army) (1860–1903), fourth child of William and Catherine Booth
- Emma (Welsh singer) (born 1974), Welsh singer, born Emma Louise Booth
- Emma Scarr Booth (1835–1927), British-born American author
