= Jean Peské =

French painter

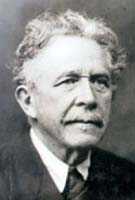
- Born: 27 July 1870; Pervomaisk
- Died: 21 March 1949 (aged 78); Le Mans

Jan Mirosław Peszke, known as Jean Peské (1870-1949) was a French painter and graphic artist of mixed Russian/Polish ancestry. His works consist mostly of still-lifes and rural scenes.

== Biography ==
His father was a prominent doctor. He began his artistic education in Kyiv; continuing at the Grekov Odessa Art school and completing his studies at the Academy of Fine Arts in Warsaw. After receiving a major inheritance from his father, in 1891, he emigrated to France.

There. he joined the Académie Julian: working in the studios of Jean-Paul Laurens and Jean-Joseph Benjamin-Constant. He also made numerous friends in the Polish émigré community, including Marie Curie and Guillaume Apollinaire.

His many artistic connections included Paul Signac, who introduced him to pointillism, Camille Pissarro, Pierre Bonnard and Édouard Vuillard. He also associated with the group of young artists known as "Les Nabis" and exhibited at Le Barc de Boutteville. After 1900, he found his stylistic home among the Post-impressionists and began painting en plein aire; notably in the area around Barbizon, where he made the acquaintance of Constantin Kousnetzoff.

From 1895, he was a regular exhibitor at the Salon des indépendants, the Salon d'automne, and at most of the better-known galleries. He gained much of his notoriety between 1920 and 1940.

He presented some of his paintings to Georges Clemenceau, who was a great admirer, and the Chalcographie du Louvre bought some of his engravings. He painted numerous landscapes in Vendée, Brittany, Bormes-les-Mimosas and Collioure, where he established a small art museum, now known as the Musée d'Art Moderne.

== Selected paintings ==
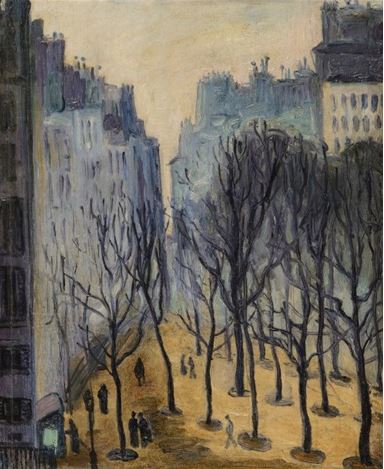
Place Dauphine, Paris

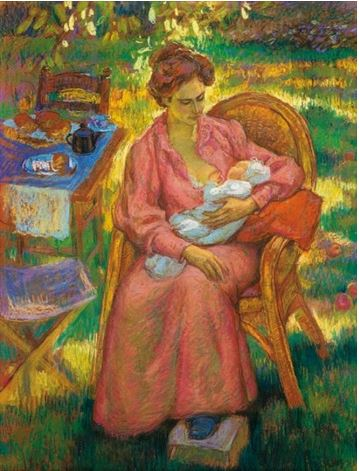
Nursing in the Garden

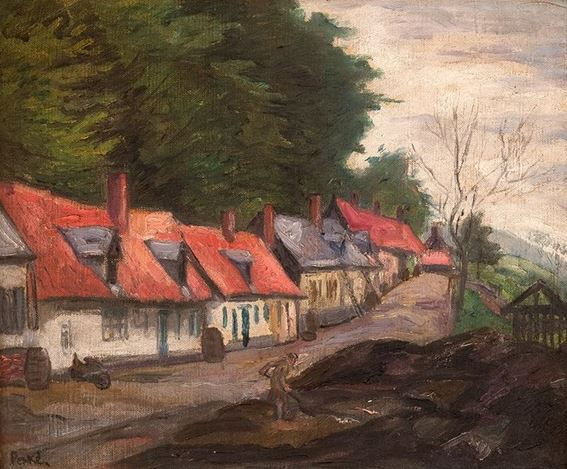
Red Roofs

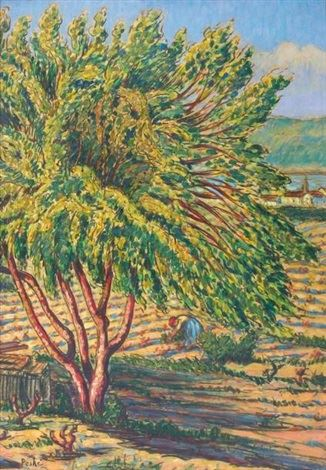
Landscape with Tree

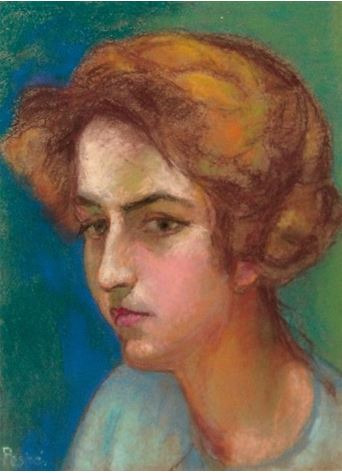
Portrait of a
Russian Woman
