= Viy 2: Journey to China =

2019 film directed by Oleg Stepchenko

- Chinese theatrical release poster
- Directed by: Oleg Stepchenko
- Screenplay by: Dmitri Palees; Alexey Petrukhin; Oleg Stepchenko
- Produced by: Gleb Fetisov; Aleksey Petrukhin; Sergey Selyanov
- Starring: Jason Flemyng; Helen Yao; Jackie Chan; Arnold Schwarzenegger; Yuri Kolokolnikov; Charles Dance; Rutger Hauer
- Cinematography: Ivan Gudkov; Man-Ching Ng
- Edited by: Arseny Syuhin; Petr Zelenov
- Music by: Aleksandra Maghakyan
- Production companies: Russian Film Group; China Film Group Corporation
- Distributed by: Universal Pictures
- Release dates: 16 August 2019 (China); 21 September 2019 (Russia)
- Running time: 124 minutes
- Countries: Russia; China
- Languages: Russian; English
- Budget: US$48 million
- Box office: US$8.7 million

Viy 2: Journey to China (Chinese: 龙牌之谜, Russian: Тайна печати дракона), (Note: Also known under the alternative titles Journey to China: The Mystery of the Iron Mask, The Mystery of the Dragon Seal, The Dragon Seal, Dragon Seal, The Iron Dragon, Iron Dragon, The Iron Mask, and Iron Mask) released in English-speaking countries as Iron Mask, The Iron Mask, Iron Dragon, The Iron Dragon, The Mystery of the Dragon Seal, and The Dragon Seal, is a 2019 fantasy adventure film directed by Oleg Stepchenko. It is the sequel to Viy, a 2014 film loosely based on the Nikolai Gogol story Viy. Produced by Gleb Fetisov, Alexey A. Petrukhin and Sergey Sozanovskiy, the film's screenplay is by Stepchenko, Petrukhin and Dmitri Palees. The film stars Jason Flemyng and Charles Dance (who reprise their roles from the first film), Rutger Hauer, Jackie Chan, Arnold Schwarzenegger, and Helen Yao.

Viy 2: Journey to China was released in China on 16 August 2019 by Universal Pictures. A sequel Viy 3: Travel to India was originally set to be released in 2023 starring Jason Flemyng and Anna Churina. However, it has been delayed for undisclosed reasons.

== Plot ==
In Ancient China a magical dragon, whose eyelashes produce a tea that cures any disease, has established a cult of White Wizards guarding it. However, some of them turned into greedy Black Wizards and ignited a civil war. To harvest more tea, they stopped trimming the dragon's eyelashes, sending it into a deep slumber. They exiled the leader of the White Wizards Et Al into the Tower of London, while his daughter Chen-Lan was sent to a Russian prison.

There, she meets British cartographer Jonathan Green, who was imprisoned because his client for the map from the first film, the Russian Tzar Peter the Great, has been replaced by an imposter, while the real Tzar is held with Et Al in the Tower of London. Because of his step-father's influence, he is released but sent to map the East of Russia to keep him from informing Europe of the fraud. Mistaking her for a boy, he takes Chen-Lan with him as his assistant, who agrees to take him to China. At the Tower, Peter and Et Al manage to alert Jonathan's wife Emma to their presence after finding one of his letters. Realizing Jonathan's assistant is Et Al's daughter, they stage an escape, where he stays back to fight the warden, Hook. He gives Peter his magical medaillon to lead him to his daughter. Peter and Emma sneak aboard a Russian ship set to China.

Arriving at the dragon's tower, Jonathan and Chan-Lee see that the Black Wizards and their leader, the Two-Faced Queen, are exploiting and overtaxing the townsfolk. Jonathan is taken before the Queen, who has assumed Chan-Lee's appearance. Using smokes and mirrors, she pretends that she is wielding magic and controlling the dragon to keep the people in line. Jonathan tricks her into making a map of her territory to spy on her, but is caught.

Peter and Emma arrive at the town and meet with Chan-Lee. Together, they devise a plan to attack the tower to defeat the Queen, free Jonathan and reunite Chan-Lee with the dragon. Although Emma is captured and set to be executed alongside Jonathan, they are freed by the Kosacks when they destroy the robotic dragon the Queen uses to deceive the people. After Chan-Lee has freed the dragon, she fights the Queen in a duel. Chan-Lee is defeated, but after the Queen's disguise is figured out by Jonathan, she falls to her death, as she is unworthy of using the medallion. Chan-Lee assumes the throne, while Et Al is pardoned and travels to China with Hook.

== Cast ==
- Jason Flemyng as Jonathan Green
- Helen Yao as Cheng Lan
- Jackie Chan as Master Et Al
- Arnold Schwarzenegger as Captain James Hook
- Yuri Kolokolnikov as Tzar Peter the Great
- Anna Churina as Miss Emma Dudley
- Charles Dance as Lord Dudley
- Rutger Hauer as The Ambassador
- Martin Klebba as Captain
- Christopher Fairbank as Grey
- Igor Jijikine as Dead Cossack
- Robert Gilabert Cuenca as Tower Guard

== Production ==
On 5 April 2015, a press conference was held in Moscow with producers Alexey Petrukhin and Sergei Selyanov, actors Jason Flemyng, Rutger Hauer, and Helen Yao. During the conference, it was confirmed that the filming of the sequel, titled Viy 2: Journey to China, has been started.

Major film stars were planned to appear in the sequel. Initial reports had Jackie Chan, Jason Statham, and Steven Seagal as appearing in the film. In November 2016, it was confirmed that Chan would co-star alongside Arnold Schwarzenegger.

In February 2017 Production wrapped in Beijing, post-production was delayed due to disputes between producers.

== Release ==
=== Theatrical ===
The release of Viy 2 in Russia was to be held on 16 August 2018, but subsequently the premiere was postponed to 19 September 2019 while pending censorship approval in China. After the completion of the regulation of issues, the film premiered in China on 16 August 2019.

Viy 2 was released in the Philippines on 20 September 2019 as The Dragon Seal by Pioneer Films.

The film was released in the United Kingdom under the title The Iron Mask on 10 April 2020.

=== Home media ===
The film was digitally released on demand and on DVD in the United States as Iron Mask on 24 November 2020.

== Reception ==
=== Critical response ===
On review aggregator Rotten Tomatoes, the film received a score of 22% of 32 critics, with an average rating of 3.5/10. The website's critics consensus reads: "Iron Mask unites Jackie Chan and Arnold Schwarzenegger for a bizarrely misguided adventure that aims for epic fantasy with unintentionally hilarious results." At Metacritic, which calculated a weighted average score of 32/100 based on 4 reviews, the film received "generally unfavorable reviews".

Ignatiy Vishnevetsky of The A.V. Club gave the film a grade C+, saying that "two-thirds of [the film] is funny on purpose" but that it was "eventually dragged down by compounding inertia." Al Horner of Empire Magazine gave it 2 out of 5 and wrote: "It could have been a tantalising coming-together of two icons of action cinema. Instead, The Iron Mask feels oddly anemic." Peter Bradshaw of the Guardian gave it 2 out of 5 and wrote: "We are stuck with endless, weightless green-screen shenanigans involving a dragon whose eyelashes are used to create tea (I think that's right) and a cast of thousands who drift across various CGI landscapes."

=== Accolades ===
Arnold Schwarzenegger was nominated at the 41st Golden Raspberry Awards for Worst Supporting Actor.
