= Xenofiction =

Genre of speculative fiction

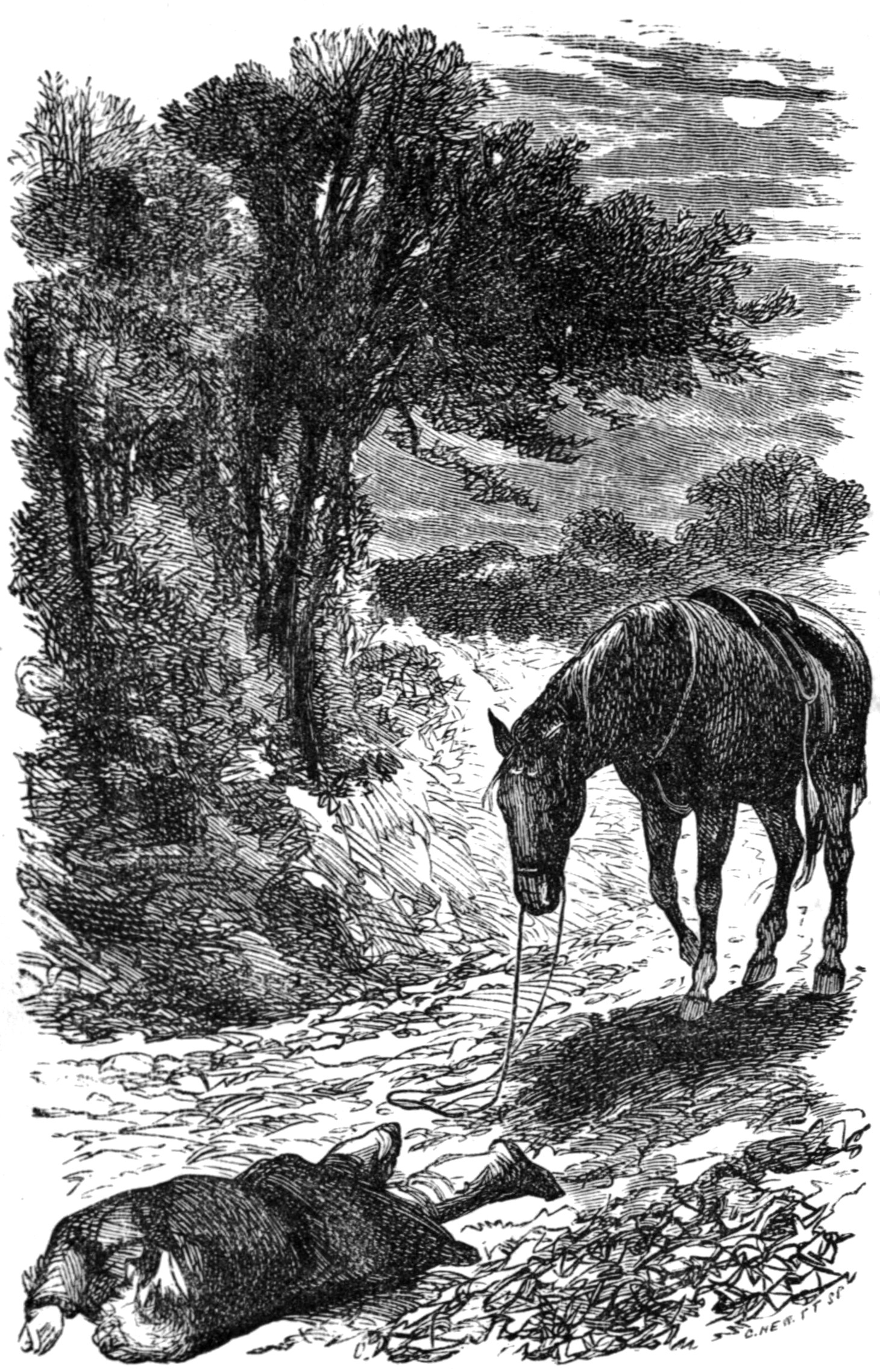
Black Beauty, a novel written from the perspective of a horse, is considered one of the earliest examples of xenofiction.

Xenofiction is a niche genre of speculative fiction centered on stories told from the viewpoint of non-human characters, particularly animal, often focusing heavily on the effects of the characters' species on their lives, and how their lives differ from those of humans. The genre is closely associated with adventure fiction and is common in children's literature. Xenofiction stories often make use of "soft" anthropomorphism that retains most of the characters' animalness, ecological themes, and invented non-human vocabulary. Well-known examples of the genre include The Call of the Wild and Watership Down.

== Characteristics ==
Literature in the genre of xenofiction focuses on the perspectives of non-human entities, most commonly animals, but also non-humanoid aliens, plants, mythical creatures, and monsters. It contrasts from regular stories that use anthropomorphism as set dressing for stories still ultimately about people and human issues, such as fables. Characters in xenofiction works often have human-like levels of intelligence, but their societies, thought processes and senses are completely unfamiliar to a human reader. In xenofiction focused on wild or feral animals, humans are typically treated as plot devices, monsters, or threats, if they are even aware of human society at all. The worldbuilding of these narratives often include invented non-human words and phrases – The White Bone has its elephant characters refer to humans as "hindleggers", while Warriors has the cats call humans "twolegs". "Soft" anthropomorphism is made use of without completely erasing the otherness of being an animal, in order for human readers to understand the animal characters' pain and to unsettle anthropocentric views of the relationship between humans and animals. Ecological themes are also common in xenofiction works, such as the destruction of the animal characters' wild homes – a plot point present in both Watership Down and Warriors: The New Prophecy. Human issues, such as the borders between nations, may intertwine with animal issues, such as the animalistic concept of territory.

Xenofiction can encompass everything from a realistic animal's life story to entire societies run by animals. These works may take place in worlds that are much larger or smaller in scale than our own. Xenofiction often overlaps with the adventure genre, taking place in remote settings and focusing on a central hero character rising to meet a challenge. However, in libraries, it is most commonly grouped under speculative fiction, alongside science fiction and fantasy, since humans writing from the perspective of non-humans is by definition speculative. In Animal Presences, Gillian Beer asks, "How is it possible to be true to animal experience, even if that were the wish, if your medium of description is written human language?"

Video essayist Cardinal West proposes a division of animal xenofiction into three categories: anthropomorphic (featuring physically anthropomorphized animals, with The Wind in the Willows being named as an example), fantasy (featuring fantastical creatures such as dragons and unicorns), and naturalistic (featuring real life animal species). Xenofiction works focusing on domesticated animals are sometimes criticized for having a narrative that centers human society through the emphasis on relationships with human characters, as opposed to the de-centering and othering of humans in wild animal xenofiction.

Xenofiction frequently appears in the realm of children's literature, with notable examples including Warriors, Guardians of Ga'Hoole, Varjak Paw, and Redwall. Xenofiction stories for adults are sometimes assumed to be intended for children by nature of featuring animal protagonists. Despite its long history, the genre itself receives little attention, instead remaining rather niche – for example, xenofiction films Watership Down and The Plague Dogs, while well-received, are considered cult classics.

== History ==
While earlier books such as Keeper's Travels in Search of His Master utilize the perspective of animals, the first book considered to be true xenofiction is Black Beauty, which features a horse protagonist. The novel is an autobiography from the perspective of the titular Black Beauty, recounting his life on a farm and pulling cabs, with emphasis placed on the treatment of horses by humans. In Human Minds and Animal Stories, the authors question if Black Beauty would have been as successful if it had used a third-person narration style instead of showing the story through the mind of an animal. In contrast to most xenofiction works, Black Beauty is written primarily as a protest piece, aiming to encourage readers to empathize with horses, rather than actually trying to speculate on the life experience of an intelligent horse.

Jack London's The Call of the Wild, which focused on a sled dog, was released in 1903 to immense success. The book is notable for portraying a dog's mind as foreign to the human reader, being more animalistic than anthropomorphic in thought process. Felix Salten's Bambi, a Life in the Woods followed in 1923, with the protagonist being a young deer living a realistic deer life, who we watch grow up and come of age, and deal with the issues that come with being a deer. A notable element is the framing of human hunters as horrific beings beyond the protagonist's understanding. In contrast, Disney's animated adaptation of the novel, Bambi, gives the deer more anthropomorphic traits in order to appeal more to young children.

In contrast to the developing xenofiction genre, other literary works featuring talking animals primarily used their animal characters as metaphors for human issues, such as in the various fables and the 1946 novella Animal Farm. In The Palgrave Handbook of Animals and Literature, it is stated that animals in literature were "generally expected to function as metaphors for humans".

In 1972, Richard Adams wrote a novel about rabbits, titled Watership Down, which would go on to become one of the defining works of the genre. The characters in the novel think in very non-human ways, with societies and beliefs that are intrinsically affected by their biology and ecosystem. The rabbits in the book have their own culture and even their own language, lapine. Additionally, Adams took real life rabbit behavior into account while writing Watership Down. In Beyond the Meadow, Marwa Hussein writes that Watership Down defies the typical othering of animals in literature by placing them as the subjects of the story instead of objects.

While xenofiction primarily exists in the world of literature, in more recent times it has begun to branch out into other forms of media. For example, Sega's 1990s video game franchise Ecco the Dolphin is sometimes considered one of the first forays into the genre in the world of video games. In Playing the Animal, Melissa Bianchi cites several games that aim to accurately represent a non-human narrative – particularly Shelter, Tokyo Jungle, and WolfQuest. In comics, xenofiction may use speech bubbles to indicate communication between the non-human characters, or the "silent comic" format can be utilized, in which stories are told exclusively through visuals rather than text. Xenofiction works in anime include Silver Fang and Massugu Ni Ikou.
