= Biləsər =

- Municipality
- Location within Azerbaijan
- Coordinates: 38°37′39″N 48°42′00″E
- Country: Azerbaijan
- Rayon: Lankaran

Population
  - Total: 1,884
- Time zone: UTC+4 (AZT)
  - Summer (DST): UTC+5 (AZT)

Biləsər (also, Bilyasar) is a village and municipality in the Lankaran Rayon of Azerbaijan. It has a population of 1,884. The municipality consists of the villages of Biləsər, Ələzəpin, Seliqavol, and Viy.
