= Seliqavol =

Coordinates: 38°37′N 48°40′E

Seliqavol is a village in the municipality of Biləsər in the Lankaran Rayon of Azerbaijan.
