= Jason Flemyng =

British actor (born 1966)

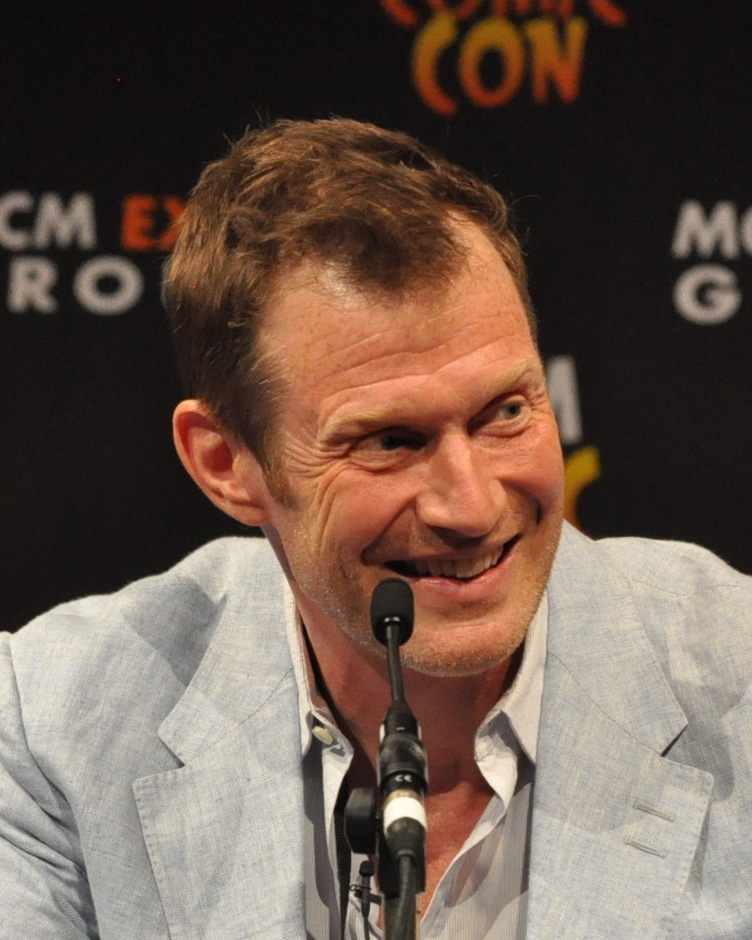
- Flemyng in 2013
- Born: Jason Iain Flemyng; 25 September 1966 (age 59); Putney, London, England
- Education: London Academy of Music and Dramatic Art
- Occupation: Actor
- Years active: 1990–present
- Spouse: Elly Fairman (m. 2008)
- Children: 2
- Father: Gordon Flemyng

Jason Iain Flemyng (born 25 September 1966) is an English actor. He is known for his work with British filmmakers Guy Ritchie and Matthew Vaughn appearing in the Ritchie films Lock, Stock and Two Smoking Barrels (1998) and Snatch (2000), (both films were also produced by Vaughn) and appearing in Vaughn's films Layer Cake (2004), Kick-Ass (2010), and X-Men: First Class (2011).

He has also appeared in Hollywood productions such as Rob Roy (1995), the Alan Moore comic book adaptations From Hell (2001) and The League of Extraordinary Gentlemen (2003), Transporter 2 (2005), and The Curious Case of Benjamin Button (2008). He has also appeared in prominent roles in both theatre and television in the UK. Flemyng speaks French fluently, and has made three films in that language. He won the Best Actor Award at the Geneva Film Festival for his role in 1996's Alive and Kicking.

== Early life ==
Flemyng was born on 25 September 1966 in Putney, London, the son of Scottish director Gordon Flemyng. He decided he wanted to become an actor after appearing in theatrical productions at his school, Christ's Hospital in Sussex. "I always wanted to be an actor," he later told the BBC. "From the time I fancied a girl who played Dorothy in the school production of The Wizard of Oz. I auditioned for the role of the scarecrow so that I could have the most stage time with her, but she ended up running off with the tin man!"

In the 1980s, he was involved with the National Youth Theatre and the political organisation the Young Socialists. He also became involved with Militant, an entryist group active within the Labour Party, and in 1987 was expelled from Labour for selling the Militant newspaper. Flemyng has subsequently claimed that both his theatrical and political activities at this time were simply a way of meeting girls. In 1990 he studied acting at the London Academy of Music and Dramatic Art (LAMDA), where he was a classmate of Hermione Norris. Following his graduation from LAMDA in the early 1990s he joined the Royal Shakespeare Company.

== Career ==
One of his first prominent roles on screen was John Merrygrove in ITV's comedy-drama series Rich Tea and Sympathy in 1991 and he was a guest appearance in the American television series The Young Indiana Jones Chronicles in 1992. He was then a regular in the ITV drama series Doctor Finlay from 1993 to 1996.

His first film appearance was in the 1994 version of The Jungle Book. His first major cinema role was in Angela Pope's 1996 drama Hollow Reed, where he played a child abuser, followed by a main role in Guy Ritchie's popular 1998 London gangster film Lock, Stock and Two Smoking Barrels. Flemyng later claimed to have lost so much money while playing poker with the film's backers in between takes on set that he had to work on the four days of re-shoots the film required for no fee. He went on to appear in films such as The Red Violin and Deep Rising (1998), Snatch (2000), George A. Romero's Bruiser (2000) and Rock Star (2001). Flemyng also starred in the short film Feeling Good, written by Dexter Fletcher, whom he met while working on Lock, Stock and Two Smoking Barrels.

In the early 2000s he featured in two big-budget Hollywood films which were adaptations of Alan Moore comic books; as John Netley in 2001's From Hell, with Johnny Depp, and 2003's The League of Extraordinary Gentlemen, with Sean Connery, in which Flemyng played Dr. Henry Jekyll and Edward Hyde. The latter film was a disappointment, but Flemyng commented that: "It was a bit of a nightmare... the film cost a fortune and didn't make back the money it was meant to... But I still get a huge kick out of doing films like that and From Hell. Any day you walk onto a set and Sean Connery or Johnny Depp or Brad Pitt is there has to be a good day."

In parallel with his film career, Flemyng has continued to take various television roles. He told BBC News Online in 2004 that: "Of the 40 feature films I've made, 15 of them failed to make it onto the screen and have only ever been seen by cast and crew. It is very frustrating when a film you really believe in remains unseen. That's not a problem with television. If you're a painter you don't paint a picture and then stick it under the bed – you want people to see it." In 2005 he played the famous science-fiction role of Professor Bernard Quatermass when digital television channel BBC Four produced a live remake of the 1953 serial The Quatermass Experiment. In 2005 he also played the part of Dimitry, a Russian ex-biological weapons specialist, in Transporter 2, where he was briefly reunited with Jason Statham.

In 2009, Flemyng joined the cast of the ITV science fiction cult drama series Primeval during its third series, as maverick ex-policeman Danny Quinn. He received top billing as the series' new star, taking over from Douglas Henshall. In March 2010 Flemyng earned a lead role as Cpl. Callow in the war/horror film The 4th Reich.

On 15 August 2010, it became public that he had been cast in the role of Azazel in the X-Men prequel, X-Men: First Class, directed by Matthew Vaughn.

In 2011, Flemyng reprised his character of Danny Quinn in the last episode of Primeval's fourth series, it is said that he would return as Danny Quinn one last time before the finale of the shows fifth series.

In 2012, he starred in I Give It a Year (released in Feb 2013), as the bride's brother-in-law in a British romcom by Working Title. In 2014, he had the leading role of 18th century cartographer, Jonathan Green in the fantasy film Forbidden Empire.

After two years, he completed work on the feature film The Journey on which he also serves as producer, in which he plays Ozzy. The film was written especially for him and took two years to complete, it was filmed in Greece and London and is directed by Lance Nielsen In January 2015, Flemyng signed with UK-based Evolution Pictures to direct the vampire film Eat Locals.

Flemyng appears as himself in the 2018 short film To Trend on Twitter in aid of young people with cancer charity CLIC Sargent with comedians Reece Shearsmith, Steve Pemberton, Helen Lederer and David Baddiel.

In 2021, Audible released Flemyng's recording of William Gibson's acclaimed sci-fi novel Neuromancer.

== Personal life ==
For nine years, Flemyng and actress Lena Headey were a couple; the relationship ended in 2001. Flemyng married Elly Fairman in the summer of 2008, in Tuscany, Italy. The pair have twin boys, Noah and Cassius, who were born in 2012. The boys made their screen acting debut in 2026, starring as twins Sam and Eric in BBC's Lord of the Flies. In 2020, Flemyng said they had all suffered from COVID-19. Flemyng enjoys long-distance running and has completed several marathons. Flemyng is a supporter of Chelsea F.C.

== Filmography ==
=== Film ===
Year	Title	Role	Notes
1994	The Jungle Book	Lieutenant John Wilkins	
1995	Rob Roy	Gregor	
1996	Stealing Beauty	Gregory	
1996	Hollow Reed	Frank Donally	
1996	Indian Summer	Tonio	Also known as Alive & Kicking
1997	The James Gang	Frank James	
1997	The Life of Stuff	Willie Dobie	
1997	Spice World	Brad	Also known as Spiceworld: The Movie
1998	Lock, Stock and Two Smoking Barrels	Tom	
1998	The Red Violin	Frederick Pope	
1998	Deep Rising	Mulligan	
1999	Tube Tales	Luke	Segment: "Mr. Cool"
2000	Snatch	Darren	
2000	Bruiser	Henry Creedlow	
2001	Anazapta	Nicholas	
2001	The Body	Father Walter Winstead	
2001	From Hell	John Netley	
2001	Mean Machine	Bob Likely	
2001	The Bunker	Corporal Bruno Baumann	
2001	Rock Star	Bobby Beers	
2002	Below	Stumbo	
2003	The League of Extraordinary Gentlemen	Dr. Henry Jekyll / Mr. Edward Hyde	
2004	Lighthouse Hill	Charlie Davidson	
2004	Aaltra	L'Anglais à la moto	
2004	Atomik Circus – Le retour de James Bataille	James Bataille	
2004	Drum	Jim Bailey	
2004	Layer Cake	Larry "Crazy Larry" Flynn	
2004	Seed of Chucky	Santa Claus	
2005	A Woman in Winter	David	
2005	Transporter 2	Dimitri	
2006	Pu-239	Vlad	
2006	Rollin' with the Nines	Captain Fleming	
2006	Telling Lies	Jack Munro	
2006	Backwaters	Jason Weiss	
2007	Stardust	Primus	
2007	The Death and Life of Bobby Z	Brian Cervier	
2007	The Riddle	Don Roberts	
2008	Mirrors	Larry Byrne	
2008	Shifty	Glen	
2008	The Curious Case of Benjamin Button	Thomas Button	Nominated – Broadcast Film Critics Association Award for Best Cast; Nominated – Screen Actors Guild Award for Outstanding Performance by a Cast in a Motion Picture
2009	Solomon Kane	Malachi	
2009	City of Life	Guy Berger	
2010	Clash of the Titans	Acrisius / Calibor	
2010	Kick-Ass	Lobby Goon	
2010	The Social Network	Spectator	Uncredited
2010	Made in Romania	Himself	
2010	Dead Cert	Chelsea Steve	
2010	Ironclad	Beckett	
2011	X-Men: First Class	Azazel	
2011	Jack Falls	Damien	
2011	Hanna	Sebastian	
2011	Lost Christmas	Frank	
2012	Hamilton: In the Interest of the Nation	Rob Hart	
2012	Great Expectations	Joe Gargery	
2013	I Give It a Year	Hugh	
2013	Welcome to the Punch	Harvey Crown	
2013	Sunshine on Leith	Harry Harper	
2013	Words of Everest	Edmund Hillary	
2014	Forbidden Empire	Jonathan Green	
2014	Top Dog	Dan	
2014	Gemma Bovery	Charles Bovery	
2014	The Journey	Ozzy	
2014	Stonehearst Asylum	Swanwick	
2015	Meet Pursuit Delange: The Movie	Jonty Smith	
2016	Sweet Maddie Stone	Mr. Straker	Short film
2017	Access All Areas	Pete Kurtz	
2017	Revolt	Stander	
2017	The Black Prince	Dr. Login	
2018	Walk Like a Panther	Ginger Frost	
2019	Viy 2: Journey to China	Jonathan Green	
2019	Military Wives	Crooks	
2019	Homeless Ashes	Gavin	
2021	Boiling Point	Alastair Skye	
2022	The 355	Elijah Clarke	
2024	Firecracker	Detective Gray	
2024	Ka Whawhai Tonu	Daniel Morgan	
2024	Touchdown	Professor Steven Landers	
2024	The Stoic	Carlisle	
2025	A Working Man	Wolo Kolisnyk	
2025	My Fault: London	Travis	
2026	Batman: Knightfall	Matt Hatter / Jervis Tetch	Voice; Direct-to-video
TBA	Pegasus Bridge	Nigel Poett	
TBA	Viy 3: Journey to India	Jonathan Green	

=== Television ===
Year	Title	Role	Notes
1991	Rich Tea and Sympathy	John Merrygrove	6 episodes
1991	Screen One	Colin	Episode: "A Question of Attribution"
1992	The Good Guys	Dave Gilchrist	Episode: "Find the Lady"
1992	The Young Indiana Jones Chronicles	Emile	2 episodes
1992	Witchcraft	Assistant Director	2 episodes
1993	Lovejoy	Danny	Episode: "God Helps Those"
1993–1994	Doctor Finlay	Dr. David Neil	12 episodes
1996	Beck	Laurie Quinn	Episode: "Pride Before a Fall"
1997	The Ruth Rendell Mysteries	Peter Milton	Episode: "The Double"
1997	The Temptation of Franz Schubert	Franz von Schober	Television film
1997	The Hunger	Young Man	Episode: "Menage a Trois"
1998	Tess of the D'Urbervilles	Alec D'Urberville	Television film
1999	Alice in Wonderland	The Knave of Hearts	Television film
1999	Chasseurs d'écume	William Callaghan	Miniseries
1999	Love in the 21st Century	Nick	Episode: "Commitment"
2004	When I'm 64	Ray "Little Ray"	Television film
2004	Agatha Christie's Marple	Lawrence Redding	Episode 2: "The Murder at the Vicarage"
2005	The Quatermass Experiment	Professor Bernard Quatermass	Television film
2005	Faith	Martin	Television film
2005	Manhunters	Jim Corbett	Episode: "The Man-Eating Leopard of Rudraprayag"
2005	The Ghost Squad	DS Jimmy Franks	Episode: "Firewall"
2006	Losing Gemma	Zac	2 episodes
2009–2011	Primeval	Danny Quinn	9 episodes
2011	Jean-Claude Van Damme: Behind Closed Doors	The Narrator	Documentary
2013	Black Mirror	Jack Napier	Episode: "The Waldo Moment"
2014	The Musketeers	Vadim	Episode: "Sleight of Hand"
2014	The Missing	Mark	8 episodes
2015	The Last Kingdom	King Edmund	Episode: "Episode 2"
2017	SS-GB	Colonel George Mayhew	5 episodes
2017–2018	Jamestown	Sir George Yeardley	13 episodes
2018	Save Me	Tam	6 episodes
2019–2022	Pennyworth	Lord Harwood	Main role
2019–2022	Love, Death & Robots	Paln	Episode: "Bad Travelling"
2019	A Christmas Carol	The Ghost of Christmas Yet to Come	Miniseries
2020	Two Weeks to Live	DI Alan Brooks	Main role
2022	The Walk-In	Nick Lowles	Main role
2023	A Town Called Malice	Albert Lord	Main role
2024	The Famous Five	Great Supremo	Main role
2025	Prime Target	Stephen Patrick Nield	Main role
2025	Trigger Point	Steven Wyles	6 episodes (Season 3)

=== Video games ===
Year	Title	Role
2025	Killing Floor 3	Foster
