= Viy (story) =

1835 horror novella by Nikolai Gogol

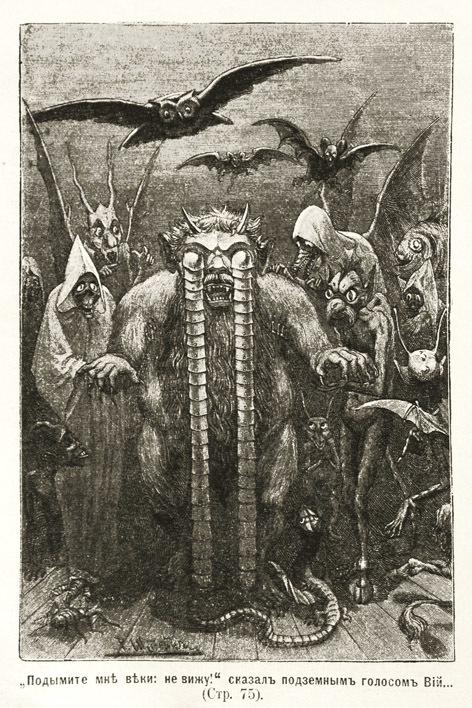
Illustration for Viy by R.Shteyn (1901)

"Viy" (Russian: Вий, IPA: [ˈvʲij]; pronounced /ˈviː/ in English), also translated as "The Viy", is a horror novella by the writer Nikolai Gogol, first published in volume 2 of his collection of tales entitled Mirgorod (1835).

Despite an author's note alluding to folklore, the title character is generally conceded to be wholly Gogol's invention.

== Plot summary ==
Students at Bratsky Monastery in Kiev break for summer vacation. The impoverished students must find food and lodging along their journey home.

Three students, the kleptomaniac theologian Khalyava, the merry-making philosopher Khoma Brut, and the younger rhetorician Tiberiy Gorobets, find wheat fields suggesting a nearby village. They leave the high road and walk for some time before reaching a farm with two cottages as night draws near. An old woman begrudgingly lodges the three travelers separately.

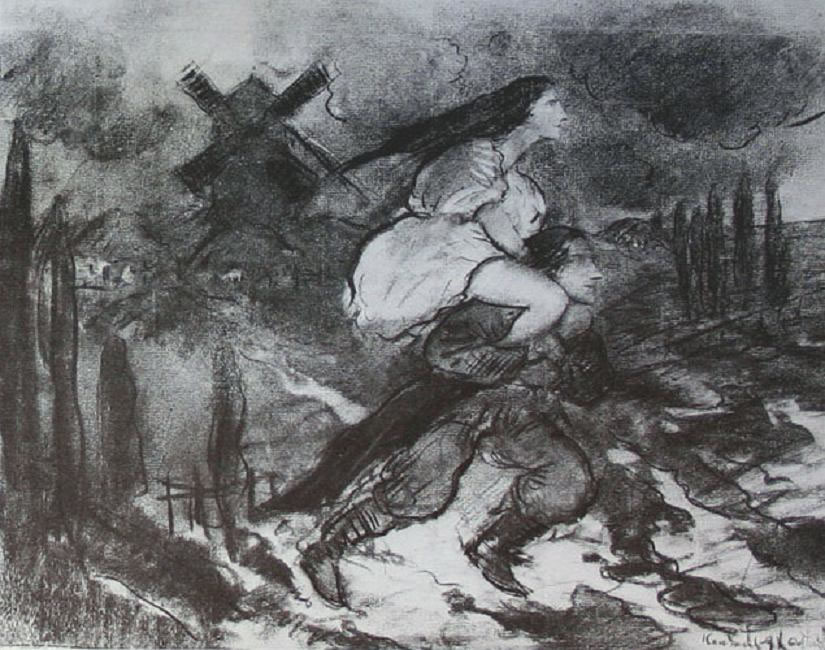
The witch rides Khoma. —Constantin Kousnetzoff, a study for his colour illustration in the French edition of Viy (1930)

At night, the woman calls on Khoma and begins grabbing at him. This is no amorous embrace; the flashy-eyed woman leaps on his back and rides him like a horse. When she broom-whips him, his legs begin to move beyond his control. He sees the black forest part before them and realizes she is a witch (Russian: ведьма, ved'ma). He is strangely envisioning himself galloping over the surface of a mirror-like sea. He sees his own reflection in it, and the grass grows deep underneath; he bears witness to a sensually naked water nymph (rusalka).

By chanting prayers and exorcisms, he slows himself down, and his vision is back to seeing ordinary grass. He throws off the witch and rides on her back instead. He picks up a log (Note: Or "billet" (полено)) and beats her. The older woman collapses and transforms into a beautiful girl with "long, pointy eyelashes".

Later, rumour circulates that the daughter of a Cossack chief (sotnik) was found crawling home, beaten nearly to death, her last wish being for Khoma the seminary student to come pray for her at her deathbed and for three successive nights after she dies.

Khoma learns of this from the seminary's rector, who orders him to go. Khoma wants to flee, but the bribed rector is in league with the Cossack henchmen, (Note: Khoma overhears the rector thanking the gifts and advising the Cossack to bind Khoma so he does not flee.) who are already waiting with the kibitka wagon to transport him.

The Cossack chief, Yavtukh (nicknamed Kovtun), explains that his daughter expired before she finished revealing how she knew Khoma; at any rate, he swears horrible vengeance upon her killer. Khoma turns sympathetic and swears to discharge his duty (hoping for a handsome reward), but the chief's dead daughter turns out to be the witch he had fatally beaten.

The Cossacks start relating stories about comrades, revealing all sorts of terrible exploits by the chief's daughter, who they know is a witch. One comrade was charmed by her, ridden like a horse, and did not survive long; another had his infant child's blood sucked out at the throat and his wife killed by the blue necrotic witch, who growled like a dog. Inexhaustible episodes about the witch-daughter follow.

The first night, Khoma is escorted to the gloomy church to hold vigil alone with the girl's body. Just as he wonders if it may come alive, the girl is reanimated and walks towards him. Frightened, Khoma draws a magic circle of protection around himself, and she is unable to cross the line. (Note: In Gogol's works, the magic protective circle is a reference to "chur", a magical boundary that evil cannot cross, according to Christopher R. Putney. However, "chur" is a magic protective word according to other sources.) She turns cadaverously blue and reenters her coffin, making it fly around wildly, but the barrier holds until the rooster crows.

The next night, he draws the magic circle again and recites prayers, which render him invisible, and she is seen clawing at empty space. The witch summons unseen winged demons and monsters that bang and rattle and screech at the windows and door from the outside, trying to enter. He endures until the rooster's crow. He is brought back, and the people notice half his hair has turned gray.

Khoma's attempted escape into the brambles fails. On the third and most terrifying night, the winged "unclean powers" (нечистая сила, nechistaya sila) are all audibly darting around him, and the witch-corpse calls on these spirits to bring the Viy, the one who can see everything. The squat Viy is hairy with an iron face, bespattered all over with black earth, its limbs like fibrous roots. The Viy orders its long-dangling eyelids reaching the floor to be lifted so it can see. Khoma, despite his warning instinct, cannot resist the temptation to watch. The Viy is able to see Khoma's whereabouts, the spirits all attack, and Khoma falls dead. The cock crows, but this is already its second morning call, and the "gnomes" who are unable to flee get trapped forever in the church, which eventually becomes overgrown by weeds and trees.

The story ends with Khoma's two friends commenting on his death and how it was his lot in life to die in such a way, agreeing that if his courage held, he would have survived.

== Analysis ==
Scholars attempting to identify elements from folklore tradition represent perhaps the largest group.

Others seek to reconstruct how Gogol may have put together the pieces from (Russian translations of) European literary works. There is also a contingent of religious interpretation present, as well as a considerable number of scholars delving into psychology-based interpretation, including Freudian and Jungian.

== Folkloric sources ==
Among scholars delving into the folkloric aspects of the novella, Viktor P. Petrov tries to match individual motifs in the plot with folktales from Afanasyev's collection or elsewhere.

Viacheslav V. Ivanov's studies concentrate on the Viy creature named in the title and the themes of death and vision associated with it; Ivanov also undertakes a broader comparative analysis that references non-Slavic traditions as well.

Hans-Jörg Uther classified "Viy" as Aarne–Thompson–Uther tale type ATU 307, "The Princess in the Coffin".

=== The witch ===
The witch (Russian: ведьма, ved'ma or панночка, pannochka (Note: Transliterated as "ved'ma/pannočka" in Rancour-Laferriere's paper.)) who attempts to ride her would-be husband is echoed in Ukrainian folktales.

The Malorussian folktale translated as "The Soldier's Midnight Watch", set in Kiev, was identified as a parallel in this respect by its translator, W. R. S. Ralston (1873); it was taken from Afanasyev's collection, and the Russian original bore no special title except "Stories about Witches", variant c.

"Vid'ma ta vid'mak" (Відьма та вiдьмак), another tale or version from Ukraine, also features a "ride" of a similar nature according to Vladimir Ivanovich Shenrok (1893)'s study of Gogol; this tale was edited by Mykhailo Drahomanov.

A listing of a number of folktales exhibiting parallels of this, as well as other motifs, was given by Viktor Petrov (penname V. Domontovych), and paraphrases of it can be found in Frederik C. Driessen's study. (Note: The other motifs being the killing of the witch, dueling with corpse, three nights of prayer over dead girl, evil spirits attacking hero at night.)

=== Viy ===
Gogol insisted in his author's note that Viy (Russian: Вий) was the name given to the "chief of the gnomes" (Russian: нача́льник гно́мов, nachál'nik gnómov) by the "Little Russians" (Ukrainians).

However, given that the gnome is not a part of native Ukrainian folklore, or of Eastern Slavonic lore in general, the viy has come to be considered a product of Gogol's own imagination rather than a figure of folklore.

The fact that the word viy itself shows little sign of existing in the region's folklore record is an additional obvious reason for the critical skepticism. Thus, the consensus opinion of modern commentators is that Gogol invented the viy, which is regarded as a literary device and so forth. (Note: For example, "attempt at mystification", Setchkarev (1965), p. 147) or "a typical Gogolian mystification" Erlich (1969), p. 68, cited by Rancour-Laferriere (1978), p. 214; "a Ukrainian name for a metonymically displaced nothing" (Romanchuk (2009), p. 308–309).)

In the past, people assumed that the Viy was a part of genuine Malorussian (Ukrainian) lore. For instance, Scottish folklorist Charlotte Dempster, writing in 1888, mentions the "vie" of Little Russia in passing and floats the idea of a phonetic similarity to the vough or vaugh of the Scottish Highlands. Ralston suggested that the Viy was known to the Serbians, but there is no proof of this.

There is a tantalizing claim that an acquaintance of Gogol, Aleksandra Osipovna Rosset (later Smirnova), wrote c. 1830 that she heard a Viy-tale from a nurse, but this informant's reliability has been questioned, (Note: Aleksandra Osipovna Rosset (later Smirnova) wrote, ca. 1830, that she heard the story of the Vij from her nurse, and then ostensibly met Gogol shortly after, but the veracity of the statement is inconclusive "given Aleksandra Osipovna's questionable ability to report the facts".) as well as her actual authorship at such a date, (Note: Aleksandra's "Memoirs" were not of her own making, but actually assembled by her daughter Olga (who wasn't born until 1834).) so the story was probably something Smirnova had heard or read from Gogol but reshuffled as a remote past memory.

==== Heavy eyelid motif ====
The witch's husband in the Russian folktale "Ivan Bykovich" ("Ivan the Bull's Son") needs to have his eyelids and eyelashes lifted with a "pitchfork" (Russian: вилы). The aforementioned Viacheslav V. Ivanov (1971) is credited, in modern times, with drawing the parallel between Gogol's Viy and the witch's husband, called the "old, old man" or "Old Oldster" (Russian: старый старик; staryĭ starik). However, this was perhaps anticipated by Ralston, who stated that the witch-husband ("Aged One") bears a physical resemblance to what, he claimed, the Serbians called a "Vy", though he did not address any resemblance with Gogol's Viy directly.

There also exists an old folk tradition surrounding Saint Cassian the Unmerciful (Russian: Касьян Немилостливый), who was said in some tales to have eyelids that descend to his knees and are raised only on Leap Year. Some scholars believe that the concept of Viy may have been at least partially based on Saint Cassian, as it is likely that Gogol had heard about the character and designed Viy on the basis of his various forms.

A similar motif of heavy eyelids is also present in Babylonian Talmud in a story about Johanan bar Nappaha. It is also found in Norwegian tales about Sjulm and recalls the accounts of the need for tools in the raising of the huge eyelids of the giants Balor and Ysbaddaden (in Irish and Welsh mythology respectively).

== Psychological interpretations ==
In his noted 1958 psychological study of this novella, Slavicist Hugh McLean identifies the running motif of sexual fulfillment resulting in punishment in this Gogol collection, so that when the student Khoma engages in the ride of the witch, "an obviously sexual act", death is meted out as punishment. In 2009, Romanchuk undertook a supplementary understanding of this schema using Lacanian analysis, where Khoma's resistance using prayer is an enactment of his perversion, defined as "a wish for a father's Law that reveals its absence". McLean's analysis was poorly received by Soviet scholars at the time.

Psychoanalysis

Due to the psychosexual nature of the central plot, namely Khoma's killing of the witch and her subsequent transformation into a beautiful girl, the novella has become open to various psychoanalytical (Freudian) interpretations, thus the attempt by some to interpret Khoma's strife with the witch in terms of Oedipal desires and carnal relations with the mother. (Note: Rancour-Laferriere's analysis (p. 227, loc. cit.) is philological (as elsewhere). The Cossack sotnik interrogates what the young man's relationship was with his daughter, because the girl's dying words which trailed off was "He [Khoma] knows..." Rancour-Laferriere then seizes on the word ved'ma for 'witch', which has been glossed as synonym with spoznavshayasya(спознавшаяся) that contains a {-znaj} (знай) 'know' root.)

In 1965, Driessen proclaimed Viy to be "the image of an inexorable father who comes to avenge his son's incest" without underlying reasoning. (Note: Driessen stipulated that a psychoanalytic interpretation could be undertaken, but was not delving into this himself.) In 1978, Daniel Rancour-Laferriere modified this to "a condensation of the [witch] who was ravished by [Khoma] Brut and the sotnik/father who has vowed to take revenge against the ravisher of his daughter", though his approach has been characterized as "an interesting extreme" elsewhere.

Vision

Leon Stilman has stayed clear of such psychoanalytic interpretations and opted to take the eye motif as symbolic of Gogol's own quest for gaining visionary power (an "absolute vision" or "all-seeing eye"). However, his study is still characterized as "psychosexual" in some quarters.

Viy and the witch's eye

A close relationship between the witch and Viy has been suggested, based on the similarity of her long eyelashes with his long eyelids. The Ukrainian word viy incorrectly glossed as "eyelid" has been connected with a hypothetical viya or viia, meaning "eyelash". (Note: Trubachev (1967), pp. 42–43 apud Romanchuk (2009), p. 309: "Trubachev.. and Stilman.. arrived at this derivation independently".) (Note: Ivanov (1971) suggested connection with the Ukrainian вити, vyty (cog. Russian: вить 'twist') as root. This has resulted in Rancour-Laferriere stating that the "Ukrainian vyty can theoretically yield viy" and Romanchuk discovering the existence of a Ukrainian word viy, though it only means "bundle" (of brush, etc.), and tying it to the vyty root.)

Further proposed etymology entwines connection with the Ukrainian word vuy ("maternal uncle"), suggested by Semyon Karlinsky. This establishes the blood relationship between the two for some commentators.

== Adaptations ==
- Viy (1909), a lost silent film by Vasily Goncharov
- Viy (1967), a Soviet film by Georgi Kropachyov, Konstantin Yershov, and Aleksandr Ptushko
- A Holy Place, a 1990 Serbian (Yugoslav) horror film
- Viy (1996), an animated short by Leonid Zarubin and Alla Grachyova
- Viy: The Story Retold, a 2004 Russian full-motion video game
- Evil Spirit; VIY, a 2008 South Korean horror film by Park Jin-seong
- Veillée funèbre, a 2009 French comic album by Martine Muller and Jérôme Lereculey
- Gogol. Viy, a 2018 film serialized for TV as Gogol; "Viy" is the title of episode 6.

Several other works draw on the short story:

- Mario Bava's 1960 film Black Sunday is loosely based on the story.
- In the 1978 film Piranha, a camp counselor retells Viy's climactic identification of Khoma as a ghost story.
- Russian heavy metal band Korrozia Metalla are believed to have recorded a demo tape in 1982 entitled Vii; however, nothing about the tape has surfaced.
- In the 2006 platform-adventure video game La-Mulana, Viy serves as the boss of the Inferno Cavern area.
- The Power of Fear is a 2006 Russian horror film very loosely based on the story.
- In Catherynne M. Valente's 2011 novel Deathless, Viy is the Tsar of Death, a Grim Reaper-like figure who embodies gloom and decay in Russia.
- Viy (2014) (known internationally as Forbidden Empire and in the UK as Forbidden Kingdom) is a Russian dark fantasy film by Oleg Stepchenko in which a young British mapmaker stumbles onto a rural Transylvanian town steeped in the myth. Although it shares a title, it is only very loosely based on the story. A sequel, Viy 2: Journey to China, was released in 2019.
- In the 2015 mobile game Fate/Grand Order, Viy appears as Anastasia Nikolaevna's familiar and the source of her powers.

== See also ==
- Rusalka

== Citations ==
Footnotes

References

- Connolly, Julian W. (Summer 2002), "The Quest for Self-Discovery in Gogol's'Vii'", The Slavic and East European Journal, 46 (2): 253–267, doi:10.2307/3086175, JSTOR 3086175
- Driessen, F. C. (1965). Gogol as a Short-Story Writer: A Study of His Technique of Composition. Translated by Ian F. Finlay. Hague: Mouton. ISBN 9783111035680.
- Gogol, Nikolai (1937). "Viy" Вий. Polnoe Sobranie Sochineniĭ Полное собрание сочинений. Vol. 2. Akademii nauk SSSR. pp. 175–.
- ——— (1985). "Viy". In Kent (ed.). The Collected Tales of Nikolai Gogol. Vol. 2. Translated by Garnett, Constance. University of Chicago Press. pp. 132–.
- ——— (1994). "Viy". In English, Christopher (ed.). Village Evenings Near Dikanka; And, Mirgorod. Oxford University Press. pp. 367–. ISBN 9780192828804.
- ——— (1999) [1998]. The Collected Tales of Nikolai Gogol. Translated by Pevear, Richard; Volokhonsky, Larissa. Vintage Books. pp. 155–193. ISBN 9780307803368.
- Ivanov, Viacheslav V. (1971), "Ob odnoi paralleli k gogolevskomu'Viiu'" Об одной параллели к гоголевскому ‘Вию’ [On a Parallel to Gogol's Viy], Uchenye zapiski Tartuskogo gosudarstvennogo universiteta (in Russian), 284: 133–142; Reprinted p. 151ff in van der Eng & Grygar edd. (2018) Structure of Texts and Semiotics of Culture.
- Karlinsky, Simon [in Russian] (1976). The Sexual Labyrinth of Nikolai Gogol. Cambridge: Harvard University Press. ISBN 9780674802810.
- Kent, Leonard J "The Collected Tales and Plays of Nikolai Gogol." Toronto: Random House of Canada Limited. 1969. Print.
- Krys, Svitlana, “Intertextual Parallels Between Gogol' and Hoffmann: A Case Study of Vij and The Devil’s Elixirs.” Canadian-American Slavic Studies (CASS) 47.1 (2013): 1-20.
- Maguire, Robert A. (1996). Exploring Gogol. Stanford University Press. pp. 360–361, n5. ISBN 9780804765329.
- McLean, Hugh (September 1958), "Gogol's Retreat From Love: Toward an Interpretation of Mirgorod", American Contributions to the Fourth International Congress of Slavicists, Moscow, The Hague: Mouton, pp. 225–244
- ——— (1987), "Gogol's Retreat From Love: Toward an Interpretation of Mirgorod", Russian Literature and Psychoanalysis, pp. 101–122, ISBN 9027215367
- Putney, Christopher. "Russian Devils and Diabolical Conditionality in Nikolai Gogol's Evenings on a farm near Dikanka." New York: Peter Lang Publishing, Inc. 1999. Print.
- Ralston, W. R. S. (1873). "Ivan Popyalof". Russian Folk Tales. p. 72. Archived from the original on 2023-06-09.
- Rancour-Laferriere, Daniel (June 1978), "The Identity of Gogol's Vij", Harvard Ukrainian Studies, 2 (2): 211–234, JSTOR 41035781
- Romanchuk, Robert (June–September 2009), "Back to 'Gogol's Retreat from Love': Mirgorod as a Locus of Gogolian Perversion (Part II: 'Viĭ')", Canadian Slavonic Papers, 51 (2/3): 305–331, doi:10.1080/00085006.2009.11092615, JSTOR 40871412, S2CID 144872675
- Stilman, Leon (1976), "The 'All-Seeing Eye' in Gogol", in Maguire, Robert A. (ed.), Gogol from the Twentieth Century, Princeton University Press, pp. 376–389, ISBN 9780691013268
