= Keeper's Travels in Search of His Master =

1798 novel by Edward Augustus Kendall

Keeper's Travels in Search of His Master is a children's novel written in 1798 by Edward Augustus Kendall, and reprinted throughout the nineteenth century.

It is a work of romanticism which illustrates the change in the representation of animals in literature, from the fabulous, the allegorical and the satirical to the naturalistic and the empathetic. By employing new narrative techniques for representing thought in fiction, Kendall pioneered writers' attempts to imagine and describe the experiences of animals, becoming an early example of xenofiction. In Keeper's Travels, the main character, Keeper, is given a speaking voice.

== Plot ==
A dog who becomes lost and injured recounts the many people whom he came across in his journey home, some who took him in and nursed him, and others who took their boot to him. He meets a woman named Caroline who cares for him, and when his Master returns, he marries Caroline as thanks.
