= Ələzəpin =

- Location within Azerbaijan
- Coordinates: 38°37′29″N 48°39′47″E
- Country: Azerbaijan
- Rayon: Lankaran
- Municipality: Biləsər
- Time zone: UTC+4 (AZT)
  - Summer (DST): UTC+5 (AZT)

Ələzəpin is a village in the Lankaran Rayon of Azerbaijan. The village forms part of the municipality of Biləsər.

The village hosts several endangered native plant species.
