= Carnival Museum =

Museum in Montevideo, Uruguay

The Carnival Museum
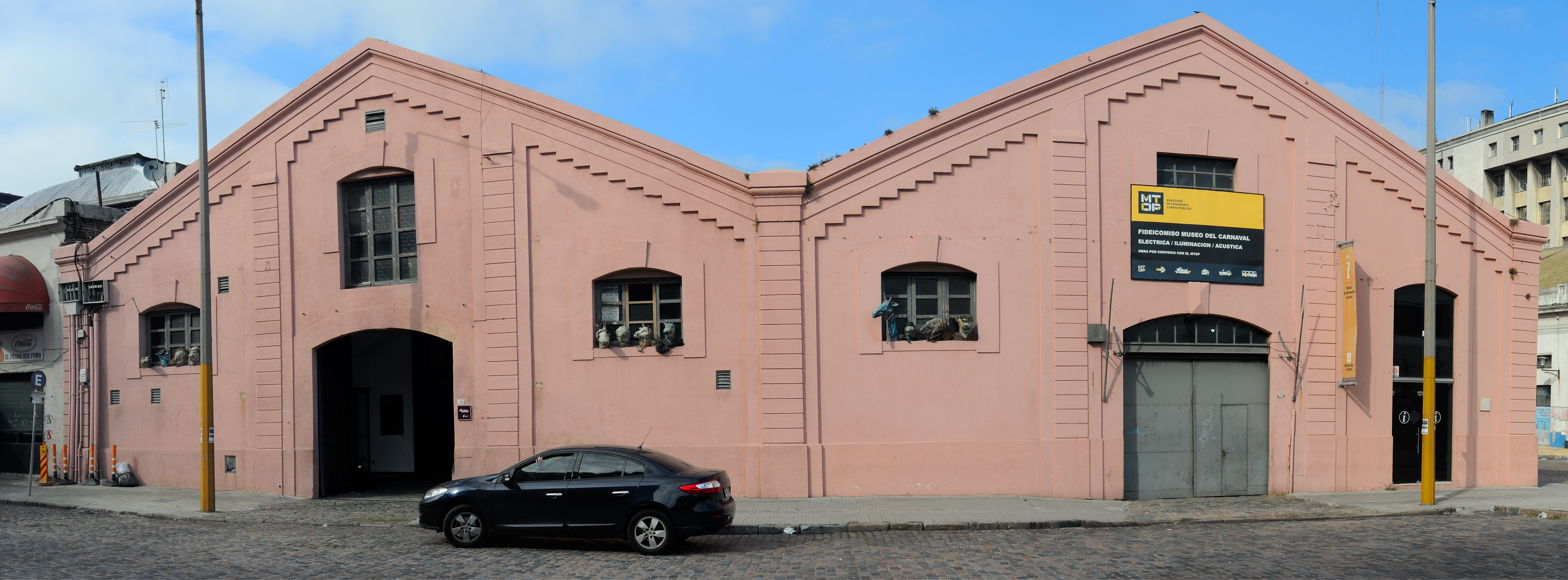
- Established: November 7, 2006; 19 years ago
- Location: Ciudad Vieja, Montevideo 25 de Mayo (Montevideo); Uruguay
- Coordinates: 34°54′19.5696″S 56°12′44.139″W
- Visitors: 2,500 /year
- Director: Graciela Michelini
- Website: museodelcarnaval.org

Short video inside Carnival Museum in Montevideo, Uruguay

The Carnival Museum is located at 25 De Mayo Street in the "Ciudad Vieja" (Old City) in Montevideo, Uruguay. It was built in November 2006.

The museum has galleries on Candombe, Carnival, Uruguayan Carnival and Murga.

== Photo gallery ==
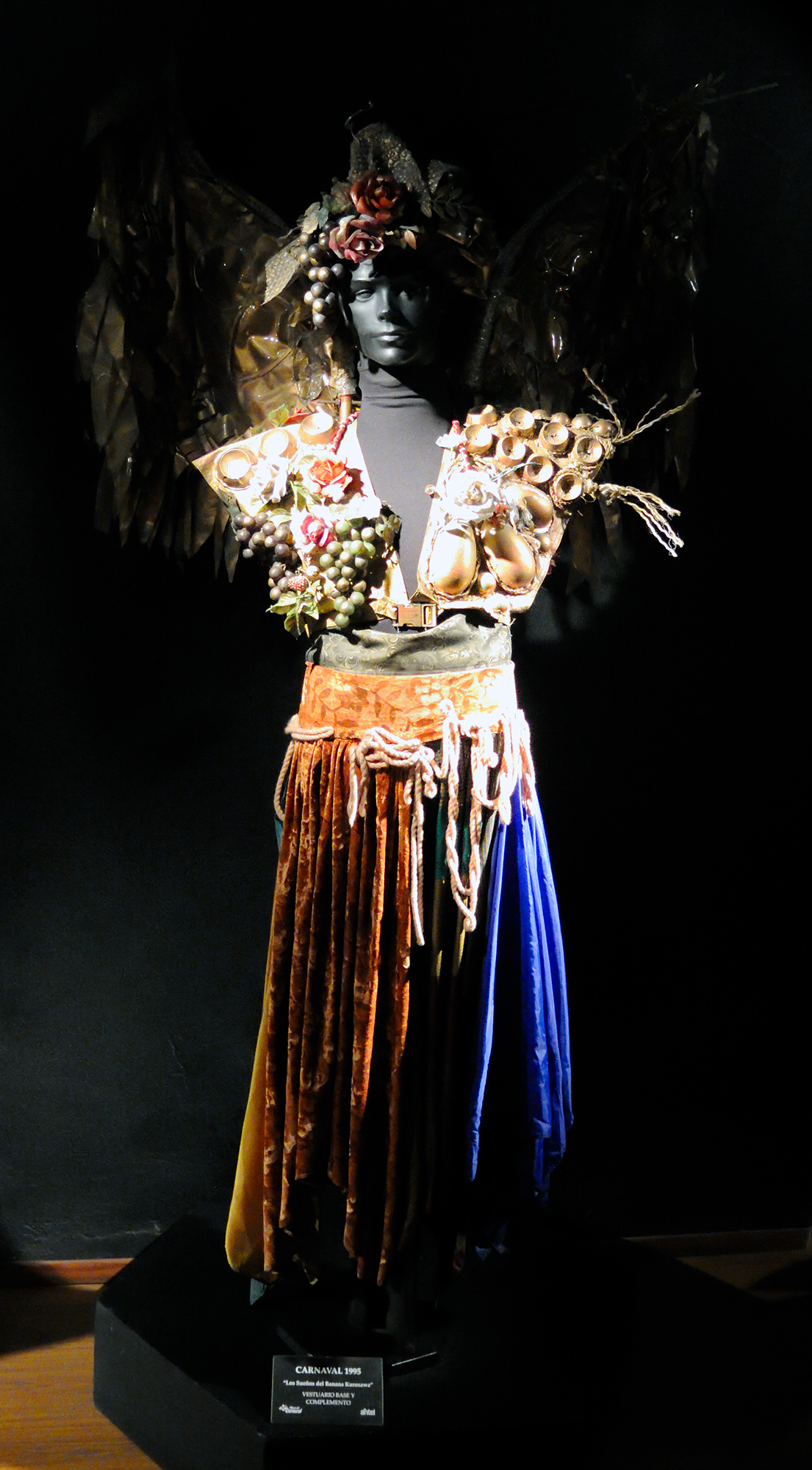
1995 Murga Outfit

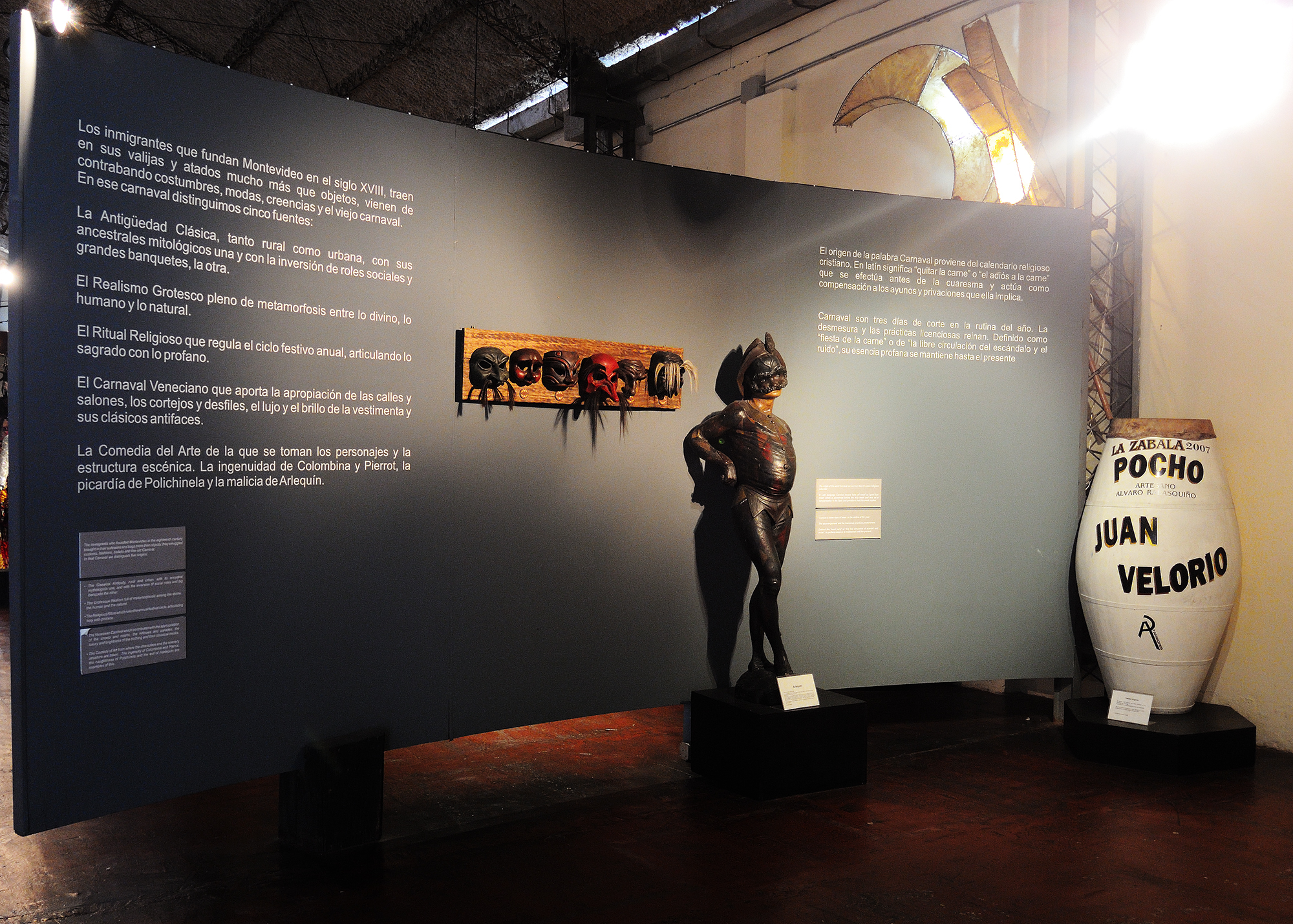
The gallery at Carnival Museum in Montevideo, Uruguay

== See also ==
- Uruguayan Carnival
- Candombe
- Murga
