= The English Boy at the Cape: An Anglo-African Story =

The English Boy at the Cape: An Anglo-African Story is a children's novel by Edward Augustus Kendall, first published in 1835. After writing a number of stories for children, Kendall toured America, worked in Canada, visited the West Indies, British India and the Cape Colony. On his return to England, he became a campaigner for the rights of the poor, and especially of children.

The English Boy at the Cape: An Anglo-African Story was one of the first novels to be set in South Africa. At the time, children's rights in the Cape were a subject of scandal with Britain exporting thousands of unwanted children as child labour to its colonies. In the 1830s some were sent to the Cape by the Children's Friend Society. Some of these teenagers were not only literate but determined enough to pay postage out of their meagre wages to write letters home detailing the conditions under which they were kept. While some had no complaint, others reported that they were treated badly. Their families, in turn, passed the letters on to the newspapers, where they were published. They created such a storm that the Colonial Secretary ordered an investigation, as a result of which no more children were sent to South Africa, while Canada and Australia continued to receive them right up to the middle of the twentieth century.

In The English Boy at the Cape: An Anglo-African Story, Kendall makes a graphic plea for religious and racial tolerance. A little English boy, Charles, becomes a street child in Cape Town. He is taken in by a Muslim family, who teach him cleanliness, godliness, schooling and industry. A shocking episode occurs when a gang of drunken British midshipmen break up a Muslim festival, accusing the participants of devil-worship. Even Charles is injured in the brawl. People of all colours, except the English and Dutch, tend the injured, and Charles is cared for by "the Jew Benjamin". At other points in the long story, he is also cared for by various indigenous people.

== Publication details ==
The English Boy at the Cape: An Anglo-African Story, 3 volumes, London, Whittaker, 1835.
