= Viy (2014 film) =

2014 film directed by Oleg Stepchenko

- English release poster
- Directed by: Oleg Stepchenko
- Written by: Aleksandr Karpov; Oleg Stepchenko
- Based on: Viy by Nikolai Gogol
- Produced by: Alexander Culicov; Leonid Ogorodnikov; Aleksey Petrukhin; Sergey Sozanovskiy
- Starring: Jason Flemyng; Aleksey Chadov; Valery Zolotukhin; Anna Churina; Charles Dance; Agniya Ditkovskite
- Cinematography: Vladimír Smutný
- Edited by: Oleg Stepchenko
- Music by: Anton Garcia
- Production companies: Russian Film Group; Мarins Group Entertainment
- Distributed by: NBC Universal Russia
- Release date: 30 January 2014 (Russia)
- Running time: 130 minutes
- Countries: Russia; Ukraine
- Languages: Russian; English
- Budget: $26 million
- Box office: $38.9 million

Viy 3D (Russian: «Вий», Ukrainian: «Вій», internationally known as Forbidden Empire, and in the UK as Forbidden Kingdom) is a 2014 Russian-Ukrainian fantasy film loosely based on the Nikolai Gogol story of the same name. The film was released in cinemas in Russia, Ukraine and Azerbaijan on 30 January 2014, in the United States on 22 May 2015 and in the United Kingdom on 1 June 2015.

The film is directed by Oleg Stepchenko, based on the first manuscript of Nikolai Gogol. The film had been in production by Film Group and Marins Group Entertainment since December 2005 and stopped several times due to lack of funding. In October 2012, the filming was completed and released by NBC Universal Russia. Viy was a huge commercial success, even breaking a record for opening weekend in Russia, but was met with mixed reviews.

== Plot ==
Early-18th-century cartographer Jonathan Green undertakes a scientific voyage from Western Europe to the East to map the entire world. Having passed through Transylvania and crossed the Carpathian Mountains, he finds himself in a small village lost in impassable woods of Dnieper Ukraine. A year before his arrival, a demonic entity has allegedly killed a woman, after which the village elder Sotnik hired young monk Panas to pray for his daughter Pannochka's dead body in the village church. However, the malevolent spirit of the girl seemingly kills him, after which the village priest Paisiy declared the town to be cursed and locked it from the outside world. The villagers theorize that she turned into a witch, while the town was seemingly overrun by demons.

When Jonathan arrives in the village, the priest mistakes him for an envoy of the Devil due to his coded scientific writing. However, the other villagers, tired of the lockdown, do not take him seriously. As Jonathan is an atheist, Sotnik lures him to the cursed church under the pretense of wanting a map of the oblast. At dinner, Jonathan is attacked by the villagers, who have seemingly turned into demons and, after using a chalk circle to ward them off, is confronted by the demonic entity, Viy. As he looks into its eyes, he is cursed to die. However, the demon offers him a challenge: should he save Pannochka's soul, he shall lift his death curse.

At the top of the church, Jonathan begins drawing the map but is knocked down. At the order of Paisiy, the villagers imprison him and the blacksmith's daughter, Nastusya, accusing them of Devil worshipping. As it turns out, Paisiy is a charlatan that uses smokes and mirrors to suggest the gullible villagers the demonic presence. Furthermore, he has raped and killed Pannochka disguised as a demon. Panas, who has witnessed the murder, fled for his life in Paisiy's disguise and has hid costumed in the cursed church for a year, being fed by a fearful Nastusya. Jonathan uncovers the ruse and Paisiy is killed. However, it is implied that his encounter with Viy and Pannochka's spirit was real.

== Cast ==
- Jason Flemyng as Jonathan Green
- Aleksey Chadov as Petrus
- Anna Churina as Miss Dudley
- Charles Dance as Lord Dudley
- Agnia Ditkovskyte as Nastusya
- Anatoli Gushchin as Gorobets
- Igor Jijikine as Dorosh
- Aleksandr Karpov as Panas
- Ivan Mokhovikov as Khalyava
- Aleksey Ogurtsov as Spirid
- Alexey A. Petrukhin as Khoma
- Nina Ruslanova as Yavtukh's wife
- Andrey Smolyakov as Paisiy
- Oleg Taktarov as Gritsko
- Yuriy Tsurilo as Sotnik
- Aleksandr Yakovlev as Kosoglazyy Kazak
- Olga Zaytseva as Pannochka
- Valeriy Zolotukhin as Yavtukh
- Emma Černá as Babka Ganna

== Production ==
In 2006, Russian producer Alexey Petrukhin and Russian director Oleg Stepchenko decided that they wanted to make a film based on the horror story of Viy by Nikolai Gogol. By then, two other projects based on Gogol's tale were in production, such as Taras Bulba film from 2009 and The Witch from 2006.

In order to secure the title, they needed without any further delay to release the information on the forthcoming project. In the course of three days, they filmed a teaser trailer where the role of Khoma Brutus was played by Petrukhin himself. Only after that did the active production of the film begin. When the teaser was shown in theaters, the script was not yet written and the actors were not cast. The story kept growing and changing until it turned from a simple screen version into a big-budget fantasy thriller.

The authors understood that the new times set new rules, so in 2011 they made a difficult but very important decision: they decided re-shoot the picture in 3D, even though half of the footage was already filmed. Conversion was out of the question. The decision to re-shoot was not just a PR trick. The re-shooting was taken seriously—the producers developed an innovative technology that had no parallels in the world.

Viy is an intersection of two storylines. One is the narrative from Nikolai Gogol's horror story. The writers used the first edition of the story still untouched by Belinskiy's proofs. The original version has quite different motifs and the whole narrative focuses on a different kind of drama. What's more important, this version abounds in secrets and riddles. Thus, Gogol's immortal story will be screened without cuts. The second storyline is centered on a real person—Guillaume Le Vasseur de Beauplan (1595–1685)—a French traveler and cartographer who was the first to study the Ukrainian territories and their people and culture. His research is included in the book From Transylvania to Muscovy. The producers chose his figure because he was also the first to collect and systematize under one cover Slavic myths and legends. De Beauplan was a prototype of the film's main character, Jonathan Green.

=== Filming locations ===
The castle in England where Green sets out on his journey is doubled in the film by the Czech Sychrov Castle. Despite being a few hundred years old—it was built in 1693—it is the newest castle in the Czech Republic. The legend goes that somewhere in the dungeons of the castle is hidden a treasure guarded by a "Black Lady", a woman dressed in a black gown of mourning. In order to make her figure even scarier, some storytellers began calling the lady of the castle "the Black Widow".

=== Special effects ===
The film is shot in real 3D. Stereoscopic design of the film was done by the German company Stereotec.

The producer, Alexei Petrukhin, said that originally the film was supposed to be stereoscopic. The scenes that were filmed during the first shooting period (about 20 minutes) were filmed in 2D and postconverted to 3D (in particular, episodes of Pannochka's funeral in the church were filmed that way). In 2011 the production decided to cooperate with Stereotec for the rest of the movie, a worldwide-operating, Munich-based 3D company. The rest of the picture (the remaining 2 hours) was shot with special 3D rigs from Stereotec and Cameras from ARRI in native 3D.

== Release ==
=== Theatrical ===
The announced release date was 12 March 2009 which was timed for the 200th anniversary of Nikolai Gogol, but it was postponed indefinitely since then. After they finished shooting the first film of the trilogy, the producers decided to postpone the premiere until the work on the second film, Viy 2 («Вий-2. Проклятое место»), is complete.

In April 2012, according to the official website of the trilogy, a new estimated release date was set as 2013. On 15 May 2013, as part of the Cannes Film Festival, RFG representatives has signed an agreement with Universal Pictures, to take part in production as a distribution company. The film finally appeared in theaters on 30 January 2014.

=== Home media ===
Viy was released on VHS and DVD in June 2014.

The theatrical Blu-ray version of Viy dubbed to English was released in the United States in May 2015.

== Reception ==
=== Box office ===
The first weekend take was 605.2 million rubles (some $17+ million), which was an all-time record for a Russian movie at the time. It grossed US$34 million in Russia.

=== Critical response ===
Reception of the film was mixed. According to Russian reviews aggregator Kritikanstvo, Viy holds an approval rating of 57%, based on 39 reviews.

Yury Gladilshchikov in The Moscow News gave a positive review, although he noted that the film lacks a target audience, since it is too intellectual for mass production and too simple for an educated audience. He also unfavorably compared it with Sleepy Hollow by Tim Burton.

Mir Fantastiki magazine was more positive about the movie and even named it the best Russian science fiction/fantasy movie of 2014.

== Sequel ==
On 5 April 2015, a press conference was held in InterContinental Hotel in Moscow with producers Alexey Petrukhin and Sergei Selyanov. Actors Jason Flemyng, Charles Dance and Anna Churina reprise their roles, with Rutger Hauer and Helen Yao joining. During the conference, it was confirmed that the filming of the sequel, titled Viy 2: Journey to China, has been started. The movie was partially shot in China and received help from the Jackie Chan Stunt Team, stunt coordinator He Jun, and operator Man-Ching Ng. The film debuted in China in August 2019.

== See also ==
- Viy (disambiguation)
