= Viy, Azerbaijan =

Village and municipality in Azerbaijan

Coordinates: 38°39′N 48°41′E

Viy is a village in the municipality of Biləsər in the Lankaran Rayon of Azerbaijan.
