= Maria I. Johnston =

American author and editor (1835–1921)

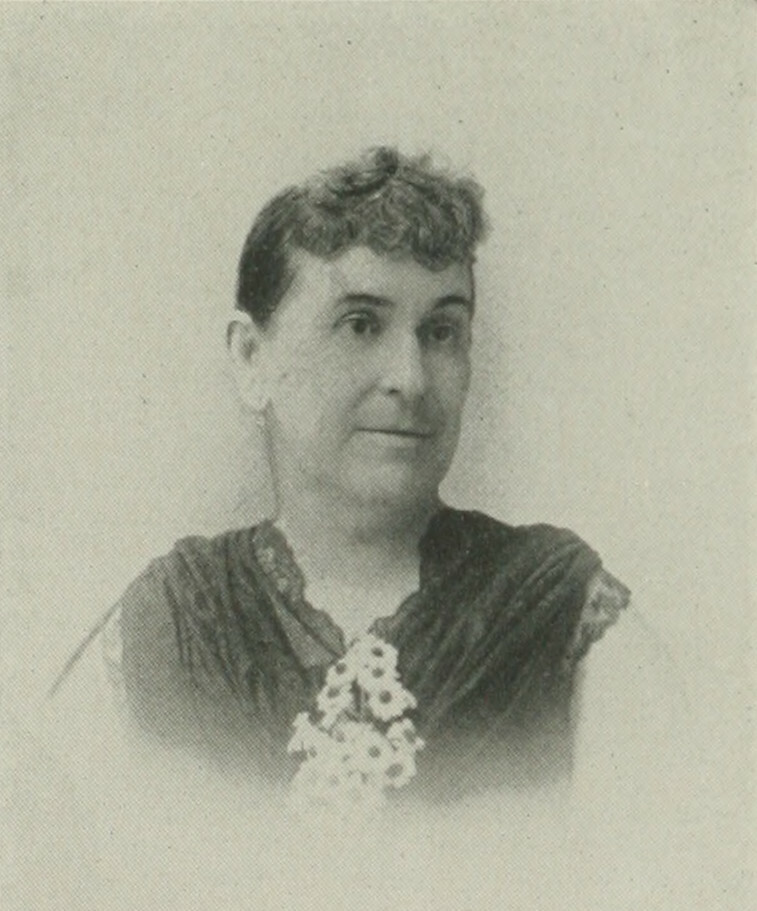
- "A Woman of the Century"
- Born: Maria Isabel Barnett; May 3, 1835; Fredericksburg, Virginia, U.S.
- Died: September 3, 1921 (aged 86); New Orleans, Louisiana, U.S.
- Occupations: author; journalist; editor; lecturer
- Spouses: Charles Lunsford Buck (m. 1852; died 1862); William R. Johnston (m. 1866)
- Children: 3
- Writing career
- Pen name: "Paul Pry"; "Neal Caxton"

Signature
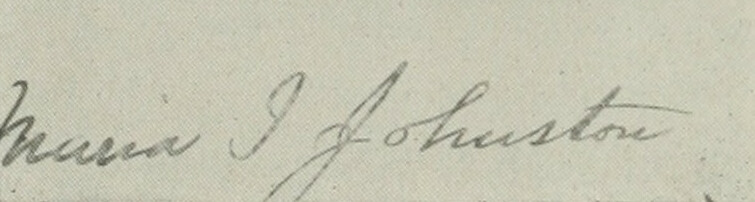

Maria I. Johnston (née, Barnett; after first marriage, Buck; after second marriage, Johnston; pen names, Paul Pry and Neal Caxton; May 3, 1835 – September 3, 1921) was an American author, journalist, editor and lecturer. She wrote many stories, long and short. In her stories, she dealt for the most part with life in the West and South, the conditions caused by war and slavery being considered. She was the author of The Siege of Vicksburg, The Freedwoman, Jane, Hector, Oh, Come with Me to the West, Love, Miss Emily's Glove, Ante-Bellum, and The Story of a Confederate Colonel. Johnston was active with newspaper work and was identified with newspapers in St. Louis, New Orleans, Vicksburg, and Memphis. At times, she wrote under the nom de plumes of "Paul Pry" and "Neal Caxton". She was advocate of and writer for woman suffrage.

== Early life and education ==
Maria Isabel Barnett was born in Fredericksburg, Virginia, May 3, 1835. Her father, Judge Richards Barnett, of that city, moved to Vicksburg, Mississippi, while she was still young. Her mother was Julia Miller (Johnston) Barnett. Johnston had ten siblings, Benjamin, James, Ella, Ada, S., William, Katherine, Juliana, M., and J.G.

Johnston was educated in private schools in Vicksburg, and in St. Louis. She also had private lessons from Josiah Gilbert Holland and studied art in Europe.

== Career ==
She was in Vicksburg during its forty days' siege (May 18 – July 4, 1863) and made that experience the subject of her first novel. In the Siege of Vicksburg (1869), a Creole story, Johnston interwove a love story with the historical facts of that period. The first edition of the book sold well, but as Johnston had no thought of continuing as a writer, a second edition was not issued.

Johnston dated her literary success from the subsequent publication of an article entitled "Gallantry, North and South," which appeared in the Planters' Journal and was copied in several other papers.

She was a reporter and correspondent for the St. Louis Globe-Democrat several years, beginning in 1879. In editing the St. Louis Spectator (1891–94), a literary weekly paper for family reading, Johnston covered a broad field in literature, both general and personal. In St. Louis, Missouri, she was president of the St. Louis Writers' Club, and chair of the press committee of the St. Louis branch of the World's Fair Commission.

In 1883, Johnston wrote a strong reply to Dr. William A. Hammond's criticisms of woman politicians in the North American Review. Her reply was printed in the New Orleans Picayune and was copied throughout the U.S. Her essay on "Froude's Character of Mary Stuart" was published as a serial in the Inland Journal of Education. Johnston resided in Madison Parish, Louisiana, from 1881 to 1887. During that time, she was connected with the Cotton Planters' Association and wrote constantly in the interest of the New Orleans Centennial and Cotton Exposition as correspondent to a dozen or more papers in the Mississippi Valley. The Freedwoman was published in 1886. It was an earnest appeal to the matrons of the South. Johnston was an earnest advocate of full legal and political rights for women and wrote extensively on that subject. During the period of 1882–8, her literary work embraced contributions to the New Orleans Picayune and the New Orleans Times-Democrat.

Later, she wrote articles to the Boston Woman's Journal.

There were several novels after The Siege of Vicksburg and The Freedwoman, including Oh, Come with Me to the West, Love, Miss Emily Glove, Ante-Bellum, and the Story of a Confederate Colonel. The novel, Jane, was issued in 1892. Hector was published by a club of St. Louis women.

As its leader, Johnston devoted much time and attention to the work of the Chart Club of St. Louis. She lectured to this organization on history, literature, art, and current topics. The Chart Club of St. Louis was formed in the early 1890s, and started with only 20 members. By 1912, it numbered over 300. During these years, the hospitality of the most exclusive homes was extended for the club's meetings. The club met each year from October through February on Saturdays at eleven o'clock, the lecture concluding at twelve o'clock, after which a buffet luncheon was served. The Chart Club derived its name from a simple historical Chart made individually by its original 20 members, from a bit of paper folded into sixty divisions, each representing a Century and colored accordingly. A deep red color represented "The Era of Imperial Rome"; smoke color represented "The Decay of Civilization"; gold color represented "The Age of Pericles and The Renaissance". This then was the skeleton upon which a lecturer placed facts accumulated from analysis after she searched through academic shades of literature. Two dollars per session was the fee. Each member could bring a guest. Johnston covered many fields of intellectual work. A special program was arranged during the holiday season in which some of the best artists of St. Louis appeared.

== Personal life ==
In Vicksburg, on October 7, 1852, she married Charles Lunsford Buck (1824–1862), who died in the first year of the civil war, leaving her with three children, Horace (b. 1853), Isabel (b. 1856), and Mary (b. 1858).

On December 1, 1866, in Warren County, Mississippi, she married Dr. William R. Johnston and lived on a Mississippi plantation. By the use of her pen, when she was widowed the second time, Mrs. Johnston was able to support herself and assure that her children were well educated. Both daughters married and her son, after graduating in Yale University, became a member of the Montana bar and was made Judge of the circuit court in Helena, Montana.

For some time, Johnston made her home in St. Louis, where her daughter, Mrs. Isabel Scullin, lived. She spent periods of time in Alexandria, Louisiana, where her daughter, Mrs. Mary Wade, lived.

During the summer of 1897, and again in 1898, Johnston chaperoned a large party of young women of St. Louis traveling through Europe. In 1899, she was in Europe, traveling with another group of women from The Hague to London. In 1900, she included attending the Oberammergau Passion Play and the Paris Exposition in the itinerary of the chaparoned trip. Again in 1907, Johnston chaparoned a party of friends on a European tour.

In 1920, Johnston moved to New Orleans, Louisiana, where she died, September 3, 1921.

== Selected works ==
=== Novels ===
- The Siege of Vicksburg (1869) (Text)
- Oh, Come with Me to the West, Love (1880)
- Miss Emily's Glove (1883)
- The Freedwoman (1886)
- Jane (1892)
- Hector (1904)
- Ante-Bellum
- The Story of a Confederate Colonel

=== Songs ===
- "Battle Song of Louisiana" (1917; sung to the tune, "Maryland, My Maryland")

=== Poems ===
- "A Man and A Maid" (1915)
- "Nineteen-Twenty" (1919)

== See also ==
- List of suffragists and suffragettes
