= Annie Russell Wall =

American historian (1835–1920)

- Born: July 18, 1835; New Bedford, Massachusetts, U.S.
- Died: May 8, 1920 (aged 84); New Bedford
- Occupations: historian; writer; teacher

Annie Russell Wall (July 18, 1835 – May 8, 1920) was an American historian, writer, and teacher. After her early life in New Bedford, she taught at both Cambridge, Massachusetts and Washington University in St. Louis. A lifelong student of history, she was known for giving courses on Bible lectures in New Bedford and for giving readings. For many yeraas, she was associated with the Alliance of Unitarian and Other Liberal Christian Women.

== Biography ==
Annie Russell Wall was born in New Bedford, Massachusetts on July 18, 1835. Her father was William Allen Wall (1801-1885), a New Bedford artist of note. He painted New Bedford Fifty Years Ago. His Landing of Gosnold was hung in New Bedford's Free Public Library. In Annie's lifetime, there was scarcely one of the older houses in New Bedford that did not possess one or more of William's paintings. Annie's mother was Rhobe T. (Russell) Wall, descended from John Russell who settled in Dartmouth, Massachusetts, in the 17th century. Annie had at least one sibling, a sister, Mary.

After passing her early life in New Bedord, Wall went to Cambridge, Massachusetts to teach and later to Washington University in St. Louis.

After her return to New Bedford, around 1900, Wall became corresponding secretary of The Alliance of the First Congregational Society, an office which she filled until her death. She was a Life Member of the Alliance of Unitarian and Other Liberal Christian Women. On the occasion of the two hundred year anniversary of the Unitarian Church in New Bedford, Wall wrote its anniversary hymn.

Wall was associated with the philosopher, John Fiske. A lifelong student of history, general and ecclesiastical, each year, Wall gave courses of Bible lectures in New Bedford at the Unitarian Chapel. In 1898, in New Bedford, she lectured on "The Supernatural in Shakespeare", and on "The Philippine Islands". In 1901, in the same city, she lectured on the occasion of the 1,000th anniversary of the death of King Alfred the Great.

Wall died at St. Luke's Hospital in New Bedford on May 8, 1920.

== Selected works ==
Sordello's story retold in prose

- Gosnold and His Colony at Cuttyhunk, 1903 (Text)
- Outlines of English History, 1880 (Text)
- Poems, 1944 (Text)
- Sordello's Story Retold in Prose, 1886 (Text)

=== Articles ===
- "Dante's Imperialism", Poet Lore, October 1890
- "French Art in Relation to the Monarchy", Manual, 1916
- "Is Shakespeare's Caesar Ignoble?"
- "The Authorship of 'De Tribus'."
- "The Origin and Development of the Christian Sunday", Manual, 1916
- "The Supernatural in Shakespeare, I"
- "The Supernatural in Shakespeare, II, The Tempest", Poet Lore, November 1893
