= Edward Augustus Kendall =

British translator and writer (c. 1776–1842)

Edward Augustus Kendall (c. 1776 – 1842) was a British translator, social campaigner and miscellaneous writer.

== Biography ==
Kendall was born about 1776.

Though Americans remember him for his Travels through the Northern Parts of the United States, published in 1809, Kendall's main claim to fame are his books for children, in which he represented the characters of animals in new ways, giving them a speaking voice. Whilst there were other writers, including Dorothy Kilner, Sarah Trimmer, Anna Laetitia Barbauld and her brother John Aikin, who made smaller contributions, Kendall played a major and crucial part in shifting the representation of animals in literature from the fabulous, the allegorical and the satirical to the naturalistic and empathetic. His Keeper's Travels in Search of His Master, Crested Wren, and Burford Cottage and its Robin Red Breast, are the natural predecessors of Water Babies and The Wind in the Willows. Employing new narrative techniques for representing thought in fiction, Kendall pioneered writers' attempts to imagine and describe the experiences of animals.

During 1807 and 1808, Kendall travelled through the northern parts of the United States, as a result of which he published his historically important three-volume topographical dictionary Travels through the northern parts of the United States. Following this, Kendall spent a number of years in Canada working for the Hudson's Bay Company; after which he spent time in British India and the Cape Colony.

Following his return to England, in 1817 Kendall issued proposals for establishing in London a philanthropic institution to be called The Patriotic Metropolitan Colonial Institution, to assist new settlers to British colonies. He also proposed to form new and distinct colonies for the descendants of mixed raced Anglo Indians, and mixed-race West Indians, who early in the nineteenth century were already finding themselves outcast by both the white and ethnic communities. In the same publication, he also proposed the formation of Free Schools of Chemistry and Mathematics, principally to provide a free library for the education of the poor. In 1819, Kendall started The Literary Chronicle and Weekly Review, which continued until 1828, when it was incorporated into the Athenaeum. Kendall went on to found The Olio, or Museum of Entertainment, which ran to eleven volumes from 1828-1833.

His Letters to a Friend, 1836, is a vitriolic on Irish Catholicism, in which he assured the Irish that they lived under a vigorous and paternal government. The duty of that government, he insisted, was to repress Roman Catholicism in Ireland as well as in Great Britain.

In 1815, Kendall published a translation of Louis Bonaparte's Marie, ou Les peines de l'amour, as Marie, or the Hollanders. The Preface is simply signed E. A. K., but the Longman Divide Ledger 2D, p. 76, tells us that Mr Kendall received the payment of £31. 10. 0. as the Translator.

Towards the end of his life, Kendall wrote The English Boy at the Cape, one of the first novels to be set in South Africa.

He died, aged 66, at Pimlico on 14 October 1842. He was a Fellow of the Society of Antiquaries.

== Publications ==
- The Indian Cottage [translated from the French of Jacques-Henri Bernardin de Saint-Pierre; London, J. Bew, 1791.
- Keeper's Travels in Search of His Master; London, E. Newbery, 1798.
- The Sparrow, etc. (A tale); London, E. Newbery, 1798.
- Beauties of Saint Pierre [selected and translated Jacques-Henri Bernardin de Saint-Pierre's Studies of Nature]; London, Vernor and Hood, 1799.
- The Canary Bird: a moral fiction, interspersed with poetry; London, E. Newbery, 1799.
- The Crested Wren; a tale; London, E. Newbery, 1799.
- Adventures of Musul or The Three Gifts With Other Tales, 1800.
- The Swallow: a fiction interspersed with poetry; London, E. Newbery, 1800.
- The Stories of Senex; or little histories of little people; London, 1800.
- Lessons of Virtue; or, the Book of Happiness; London, E. Newbery, 1801.
- A Pocket Encyclopædia, or library of general knowledge; being a dictionary of arts, sciences, and polite literature, &c. 6 vol. London, W. Peacock & Sons, 1802.
- Parental Education; or, domestic lessons: a miscellany intended for youth; London, 1803.
- Travels through the northern parts of the United States in 1807 and 1808; 3 vol. New York, I Riley, 1809.
- Maria, or the Hollanders [translated from the French of Louis Bonaparte], 3 vol. London, J. Gillet, Crown-Court, Fleet-Street, H. Colburn, Conduit-Street; and Longman, Hurst, Rees, Orme, and Brown, Paternoster-Row; 1815.
- An argument for construing largely the right of an appelle of murder, to insist on his wager of battle, and also for abrogating writs of appeal; London 1817.
- A proposal for establishing in London a new philanthropical and patriotic institution, to be called, The Patriotic Metropolitan Colonial Institution for the assistance of new Settlers in His Majesty's Colonies. ... A proposal for establishing new ... Colonies for the relief of the half-casts of India, and mulattoes of the West Indies; and a postscript on the benefits to be derived from establishing Free Drawing Schools, &c. London, 1817.
- The Literary Chronicle and Weekly Review; London, 1819-28.
- Letters to a Friend, on the State of Ireland, the Roman Catholic Question, and the merits of constitutional religious distinctions; London, 1826.
- The Olio, or Museum of Entertainment; London, 1828–1833
- The English Boy at the Cape: An Anglo-African Story; 3 vols. London, Whittaker, 1835.
- Burford Cottage and its Robin Red Breast; London, 1835.
