= Viy (1909 film) =

- Russian: Вий
- Directed by: Vasili Goncharov
- Written by: Vasili Goncharov
- Produced by: Aleksandr Khanzhonkov
- Starring: I. Langfeld; A. Platonov; V. Dalskaya
- Cinematography: Joseph-Louis Mundwiller
- Production company: Pathé
- Release date: September 14, 1909
- Country: Russian Empire
- Language: Russian

Viy (Russian: Вий) is a 1909 Russian short film directed and written by Vasili Goncharov. This is the first Russian horror film.

The film is considered lost.

== Plot ==
The film is a screen version of the 1835 novella by Gogol.

== Cast ==
- I. Langfeld
- A. Platonov
- V. Dalskaya
