= Minnie S. Davis =

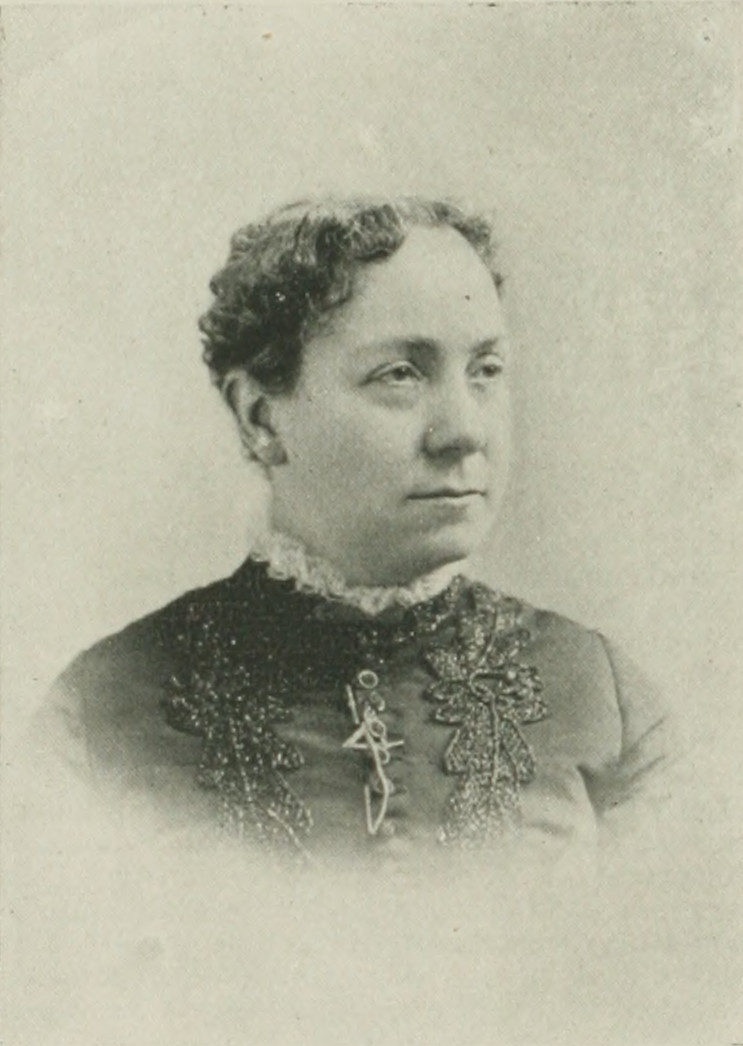
- Photo in A Woman of the Century
- Born: Armenia Skinner Davis; March 25, 1835; Baltimore, Maryland, U.S.
- Died: April 19, 1927 (aged 92)
- Resting place: Cedar Hill Cemetery, Hartford, Connecticut, U.S.
- Education: Green Mountain Institute
- Occupations: author, lecturer, editor, mental scientist

Minnie S. Davis (March 25, 1835 - April 19, 1927) was an American author, lecturer, editor, and mental scientist. Born in Baltimore, Maryland, she was the author of Marion Lester, 1850; Clinton Forest, 1858; Rosalie, 1865; and Ideal Motherhood, 1899. She was also a frequent contributor to the Christian Freeman and the Trumpet, as well as serving as associate editor of the Ladies' Repository. Davis was an invalid for many years, and was healed in 1885, attributing her recovery to "mental science", a philosophy of healing later known as the New Thought Movement. From 1885, she was in Hartford, Connecticut, devoting her time to healing, writing, and lecturing on metaphysical subjects.

== Early life and education ==
Armenia (nickname, "Minnie") Skinner Davis was born in Baltimore, March 25, 1835. Her parents, Rev. Samuel A. and Mary Partridge Davis, were natives of Vermont, but moved to Baltimore soon after their marriage. In that city, Rev. Davis was one of the earlier Universalist ministers.

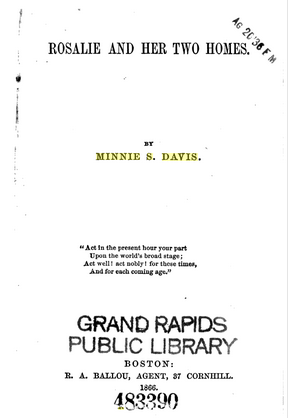
Rosalie

When about six years of age, Davis was thrown from a carriage and one of the wheels passed across her back. The shock of that accident was afterwards assumed to be the cause of frequent illness and great delicacy of health. These circumstances kept the child by the mother's side, and the close companionship had a marked influence upon her future life. When Davis was about seven years old, the family removed to the State of Massachusetts, where the father became successively pastor of the parishes in Hingham, Quincy, and Sterling. About this time, there was a revival in the community, and Davis began to realize that other denominations preached very different doctrines than those taught by her father. In her girlhood, Davis became adept in storytelling. Her younger sisters found it to be their favorite pastime hearing Davis "tell stories." One of these, Rosalie, which was published in 1859, was written by an amanuensis when Davis was too feeble to hold a pen, and in later years, it gave solace to Davis to review the story of her childhood.

Davis' school days were often interrupted by weeks of illness or suffering from weak eyes, but she was able to catch up with her studies. The mother was her constant teacher; it was from her she learned an abhorrence of slavery and intemperance. But the mother died in 1848, when Davis, the eldest, was only 13 years old, and the youngest, Florence, an infant of three months. At the age of 17, Davis entered the Green Mountain Institute, Woodstock, Vermont. From the first, she excelled as a scholar and a writer, and frequently wrote short poems.

== Career ==
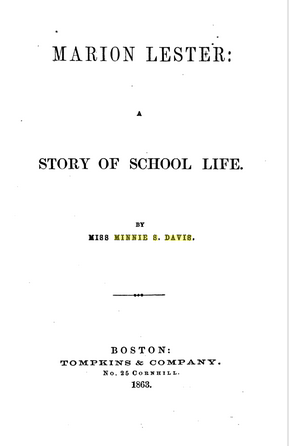
Marion Lester

Davis' favorite topic was the world of child-life. She had nearly completed a work which was afterward published under the title of Clinton Forest; or, The Harvest of Love. It treats of child-life, home influence, school scenes, the power of kindness in the treatment of children, the wanderings and trials of the child, the joys and sorrows of life. She did not dare to publish it, or hardly show it to her friends to get their opinion of it. In due time, she completed another manuscript, Marion Lester; or, The Mother's Mistake. The mistake of the mother consisted in sending her daughter to the school where religious error required a severe form of discipline. The plot was entirely Davis'. Some of the characters were taken from real life and some were drawn from the imagination. She prepared it for the press, and in May, 1856, sent it forth. It was a success. The book was read with intense interest by thousands.

Three years later, Clinton Forest was finally published, and also had a large sale. In 1865, she published Rosalie. She had been a frequent contributor to the "Trumpet," "Christian Freeman" and local papers, and a regular contributor to the "Ladies' Repository." Of the last, Davis was for five years associate editor with Mrs. Sawyer and Mrs. Soulé.

She experienced several years of illness, including periods of limited mobility and a winter spent in confinement in a darkened room due to severe light sensitivity. During this period of convalescence, she expressed a desire to compose a long-form poem.

In 1863, she removed with her father's family to Hartford, Connecticut. A few months after going into her new home, she fell down stairs, and that was the beginning of long years of helplessness, suffering and partial blindness. All known means for her restoration had been tried, but with only partial and temporary success. In 1885, when the wave of "Mental Healing" swept over the U.S., Davis was one of the first who embraced its philosophy. A friend visited her and offered to treat her according to the new method of healing. In four months, the days of pain and the darkened room were over. She then obtained the best teachers and studied with them the philosophy of healing, and went out in her turn to pass on the work, in which she has had unusual success. Teaching was evidently her forte, her lectures being clear, strong and logical. Davis was interested in all the advanced movements of the day, including the temperance movement and equal rights.

In 1869, her sister Florence died at the age of 19. At this time a group of young sisters was growing up around her —the children of her father's second marriage. Davis took the greatest interest in their education. She became their home instructor, and sought to form their taste in reading. When her suffering confined her to a darkened room, they became her readers and amanuenses.

== Death ==
Davis died April 19, 1927, and was buried at Cedar Hill Cemetery, Hartford, Connecticut.

== Reviews ==
Ideal Motherhood (T. Y. Crowell & Co., New York and Boston) was reviewed by The Arena who stated, to read Ideal Motherhood means an upliftment of soul, a keener appreciation of woman's highest privilege. While presenting an ideal, the author does not carry it beyond the pale of the practical; she believes in the necessity of combining the masculine and feminine elements, the developed intellect and intuition, as commensurate factors in shaping the young life. The review in The School Journal goes on to say, that Davis makes some very practical suggestions regarding motherhood, the responsibility entailed thereby, and the necessity for careful and thoughtful preparation for the duties incumbent upon parents.

Living Counterparts; a Study of Vibration (1903, Alliance Publishing Company, New York), reviewed in "Common Sense", was said to have a touch of theosophical thought, and a thread of profitable study running through the work. In her chapter on the "Methods of Nature" there is perhaps more beauty than logic in her arguments, but everyone who follows the purpose of the book will admit there is a spirit of conviction and pure sentiment which carries one to a higher place in the borderland of intellectuality.

== Selected works ==
- Marion Lester : or, the mother's mistake, 1856
- Clinton forrest : or, the power of kindness, a story for the home circle., 1858
- The harvest of love : a story for the home circle, 1859
- The Child's Pictorial Scripture Question Book, designed for the smaller children in Sabbath schools., 1862
- Rosalie and her two homes, 1865
- Ideal motherhood, 1898
- Living counterparts, a study of vibration, 1903
