= Emma Scarr Booth =

American poet

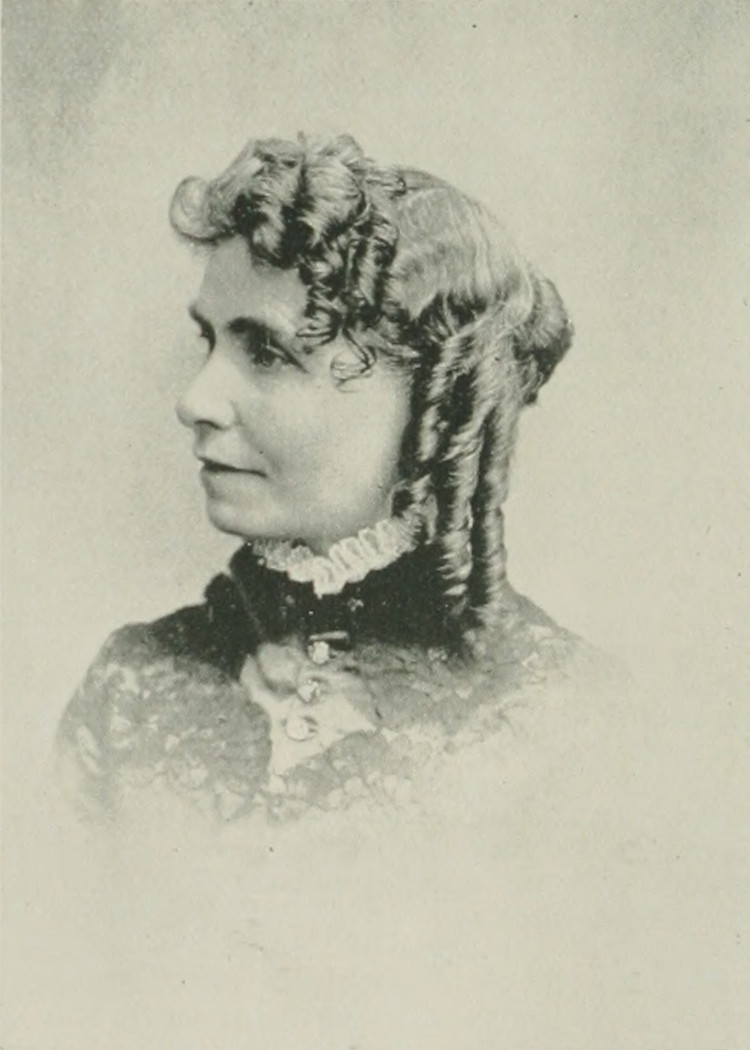
- Photo in A Woman of the Century
- Born: Emma Scarr; April 25, 1835; Hull, England
- Died: 1927 (aged 91–92)
- Resting place: Riverside Cemetery, Cleveland, Ohio, U.S.
- Occupations: Poet, novelist
- Spouse(s): First, (unknown), divorced. Second, Levi Booth.
- Writing career
- Language: English

Emma Scarr Booth (née, Scarr; after first marriage, (unknown); after second marriage, Booth; pen names, various; April 25, 1835 – 1927) was a British-born American author who emigrated to the United States as a child. She was the author of three volumes, entitled Karan Kringle's Journal, A Willful Heiress, and Poems. Booth composed numerous songs and instrumental pieces. She also taught music.

== Early life ==
Emma L. Scarr was born in Hull, England, 25 April 1835. From her earliest childhood she had a passionate love of the beautiful in nature. This was fostered by her father, who often took her with him on long walks through the countryside outside of the noisy town. When nine years old, her parents emigrated with their family of three children, two daughters and a son, to the United States. The father, wishing to try farm life, purchased a farm in the township of North Royalton, Ohio near Cleveland, being induced to settle there by an older brother, who had left England ten years before.

== Career ==
At the age of twenty-two, Scarr married an Englishman residing in Twinsburg, Ohio, and, shortly afterwards, began to contribute occasionally to some of the periodicals of the day under various pen names. At a later period, verses appeared under her own name.

Upon the outbreak of the American Civil War, her brother enlisted in the Union Army, and soon after the battle of Shiloh, in which he fought, died of disease brought on by the hardships and exposure of a soldier's life. His death was succeeded by that of the older sister, a few months later. Emma's husband, throughout the war years, had been very outspoken in his denunciation of the secession project and all those favoring it, thus making enemies of certain secret sympathizers in the neighborhood. A few days preceding the date of Abraham Lincoln's assassination, while the family was on a visit to her parents, some 20 miles (32 km) away, a friend came on horseback from Twinsburgh to inform them that their house, together with all its contents, had been burned down during the night. Not an article was saved, as no one but the incendiary had witnessed the burning. Then came the news of the President's murder, and to her depressed mind, all the world seemed going to "wreck and ruin," especially when, nine weeks later, her husband's mills with their entire contents were destroyed by fire. As none of the property had been insured, this misfortune reduced the formerly well-to-do pair to comparative poverty, and soon afterward, they left the town, removing to Painesville, Ohio. There, the wife obtained some needlework, while the husband went to the oil regions near Titusville, Pennsylvania, where he found employment. There, under the influence of some associates, he was unfaithful to his wife, and the result was a final separation a few years later.

Meanwhile, Booth had removed to Cleveland, and there supported herself by teaching music, not wishing to become dependent upon her parents, who had, however, kindly offered her a home with them. Some time later, her parents sold their farm and went to reside in Cleveland in order to be near their daughter. After the father's death, in 1872, Emma took up residence with her mother, still continuing to give music lessons. In 1873, she married Levi Booth, making her home since that time in Cleveland. In 1909, she went alone to Europe, among other places visiting the areas of her childhood. After her return, she became much interested in all movements for the advancement of women.

Booth published three volumes in book form, Karan Kringle's Journal (Philadelphia, 1885), A Willful Heiress (Buffalo, 1892), and Poems (Buffalo, 1892). She also composed songs and instrumental pieces, which were published.

Emma Scarr Booth died 1927.

== Selected works ==
=== Books ===
- Karan Kringle's journal : being comical episodes in an "old maid's life", 1885
- A Willful Heiress, 1892

=== Poetry collections ===
- The family of three, Iesuina, and other poems, 1893

=== Musical scores ===
- The patriot's hymn, 1891
