= Charlotte Louisa Hawkins Dempster =

Scottish author and folklore collector (1835–1913)

- Born: 1835; Forfar
- Died: 1913 (aged 77–78)
- Occupation: Writer, novelist

Charlotte Louisa Hawkins Dempster (1835–1913) was a Scottish novelist, essayist and author, noted also as a collector of folklore, especially in the Highland county of Sutherland. She spent much of her life in France.

== Literature and folklore ==
Charlotte Louisa Hawkins was born 10 April 1835 at Forfar in Scotland. Her name was later styled Charlotte Dempster. She was educated at home by masters in various subjects, but spent her late teens in Paris.

Dempster's first published work was an essay entitled "The Literary Remains of Albrecht Dürer", which appeared in the Edinburgh Review in July 1861. She became involved in controversy over the role and importance of the 17th-century Dorothy Osborne, after reviewing Edward Abbott Parry's edition of her correspondence for the same journal in 1888. She accused Parry of having a "gushy and self-conscious style" and unnecessarily interfering with the text.

Dempster became a member of the Folklore Society, publishing articles in its journal, reading papers before the Second International Folk Congress, and serving the folklore committee assembled for the World's Columbian Exposition in 1893.

An autobiography edited by Alice Knox was published in 1920. It had been completed in the year before her death in 1913.

== Novels ==
According to a modern critic, Dempster's novels "use a variety of settings to treat potentially serious subjects in a superficial way." Her book The Hôtel du Petit St. Jean. A Gascon Story appeared in 1869, but Vera, said to be the first novel, in 1871. Others were Iseulte (1875), Blue Roses (1877), Within Sound of the Sea (1879), Marjorie's Husband (1888) Ninette: an Idyll of Provence (1888), The Dance of the Hours (1893) and The Year Book of the Holy Souls (1901).

A cookery book of Dempster's, Australian Beef and Mutton and How to Make the Best of them came out in 1872. A volume of her essays appeared in the same year, and a travel volume, The Maritime Alps and their Seaboard in 1884.

Demster became a member of the Folklore Society, publishing articles in its journal and reading papers before the Second International Folk-Congress, and serving the folklore committee assembled for the World's Columbian Exposition in 1893.
