= 1927 in literature =

This article contains information about the literary events and publications of 1927.

== Events ==
First edition (UK) of Meet Mr Mulliner

- January – The Books Kinokuniya (紀伊國屋書店) bookstore business is established in Tokyo.
- February 4 – Gertrude Stein is honored by the Académie des femmes, an informal gathering for woman writers, founded by the expatriate American Natalie Clifford Barney at her Paris salon. Others honored include Colette, Anna Wickham, Rachilde, Lucie Delarue-Mardrus, Mina Loy, Djuna Barnes and, posthumously, Renée Vivien.
- February 24 – The new John Golden Theatre (Theatre Masque) opens in New York City at 252 West 45th Street (George Abbott Way) in midtown Manhattan.
- May 5 – Virginia Woolf's stream of consciousness novel To the Lighthouse is published by Hogarth Press in London. A second impression follows in June. It is seen as a landmark of high modernism,
- June 29 – T. S. Eliot, hitherto Unitarian, is baptised into the Church of England at Finstock. In November he takes British citizenship.
- July 5 – James Joyce's collection Pomes Penyeach is published by Shakespeare and Company in Paris.
- July 9 – P. G. Wodehouse's short story "Pig-hoo-o-o-o-ey", published in the U.S. magazine Liberty, introduces Lord Emsworth's prize pig, the Empress of Blandings. The first UK appearance follows in the August issue of The Strand Magazine).
- August – T. S. Eliot's poem Journey of the Magi appears in Faber and Gwyer's Ariel poems series in London, illustrated by E. McKnight Kauffer.
- September – Eric Blair (George Orwell) decides while on leave from the Imperial Police in Burma to remain in the U.K. He moves to London to become a writer.
- October – Victor Gollancz founds the London publishing house Victor Gollancz Ltd.
- December – Agatha Christie's fictional amateur detective Miss Marple makes a first appearance in "The Tuesday Night Club", published in The Royal Magazine.
- unknown dates
  - A translation of Franz Roh's work of art criticism Nach Expressionismus – Magischer Realismus: Probleme der neuesten europäischen Malerei (After Expressionism – Magical Realism: Problems of the newest European painting, 1925) into Spanish by Revista de Occidente leads to the concept of magic realism becoming popular in Latin American literature.
  - The Strand Bookstore is founded in Manhattan by Benjamin Bass.

== New books ==
=== Fiction ===
- Djamaluddin Adinegoro – Darah Muda (Young Blood)
- Ion Agârbiceanu – Legea minții
- Anthony Armstrong – Jimmie Rezaire
- Anthony Berkeley – Cicely Disappears
- Arthur Bernède – Belphégor
- Tjoe Hong Bok – Setangan Berloemoer Darah (A Glove Covered in Blood)
- Elizabeth Bowen – The Hotel
- James Boyd – Marching On
- Lynn Brock – The Kink
- Edgar Rice Burroughs – The Outlaw of Torn
- James Branch Cabell – Something About Eve
- Willa Cather – Death Comes for the Archbishop
- Blaise Cendrars – La Confession de Dan Yack
- Agatha Christie – The Big Four
- J. J. Connington
  - Murder in the Maze
  - Tragedy at Ravensthorpe
- Jaime de Angulo – The Lariat
- Mazo de la Roche – Jalna
- Warwick Deeping – Kitty
- Ding Ling – Miss Sophia's Diary
- Arthur Conan Doyle – The Case-Book of Sherlock Holmes
- William Faulkner – Mosquitoes
- David Garnett – Go She Must!
- Anthony Gilbert – The Tragedy at Freyne
- George Goodchild – The Monster of Grammont
- Maxim Gorky – The Life of Klim Samgin («Жизнь Клима Самгина», Zhizn' Klima Samgina, first volume, translated as Bystander)
- Julien Green – The Closed Garden
- H. Rider Haggard – Allan and the Ice-gods
- Frances Noyes Hart – The Bellamy Trial
- Ernest Hemingway – Men Without Women
- Hermann Hesse – Steppenwolf
- James Weldon Johnson – God's Trombones
- Franz Kafka – Amerika
- Margaret Kennedy – Red Sky at Morning
- Joseph Kessel – Nights of Princes
- Ronald Knox – The Three Taps
- Kwee Tek Hoay – Boenga Roos dari Tjikembang
- Ze'ev Jabotinsky – Samson
- D. H. Lawrence – John Thomas and Lady Jane
- Halldór Laxness – Vefarinn mikli frá Kasmír (The Great Weaver from Kashmir)
- Rosamond Lehmann – Dusty Answer
- Sinclair Lewis – Elmer Gantry
- Marie Belloc Lowndes – The Story of Ivy
- Philip MacDonald – Patrol
- Compton Mackenzie
  - Rogues and Vagabonds
  - Vestal Fire
- A. E. W. Mason – No Other Tiger
- François Mauriac – Thérèse Desqueyroux
- Vilhelm Moberg – Raskens
- Paul Morand – The Living Buddha
- Mourning Dove – Cogewea, the Half-Blood: A Depiction of the Great Montana Cattle Range
- Yury Olesha – Envy («Зависть», Zavist')
- Edith Olivier – The Love Child
- E. Phillips Oppenheim – Miss Brown of X.Y.O.
- Baroness Orczy – Sir Percy Hits Back
- T. F. Powys – Mr. Weston's Good Wine
- J. B. Priestley – Benighted
- Marcel Proust (died 1922) – Le Temps retrouvé (Time Regained or The Past Recaptured; final instalment of In Search of Lost Time)
- Waverley Lewis Root – King of the Jews
- Joseph Roth – Flight without End
- Rafael Sabatini – The Nuptials of Corbal
- Dorothy L. Sayers – Unnatural Death
- Upton Sinclair – Oil!
- Cecil Street
  - The Ellerby Case
  - Mademoiselle From Armentieres
- Aleksey Nikolayevich Tolstoy – The Garin Death Ray («Гиперболоид инженера Гарина»)
- B. Traven – The Treasure of the Sierra Madre (Der Schatz der Sierra Madre)
- Sigrid Undset
  - The Snake Pit
  - The Son Avenger
- Konstantin Vaginov – Goat Song
- S. S. Van Dine – The Canary Murder Case
- Edgar Wallace
  - The Forger
  - The Squeaker
  - Terror Keep
  - The Traitor's Gate
- Thornton Wilder – The Bridge of San Luis Rey
- Henry Williamson – Tarka the Otter
- P. G. Wodehouse
  - Meet Mr Mulliner
  - The Small Bachelor
- Virginia Woolf – To the Lighthouse
- Eiji Yoshikawa (吉川 英治) – Naruto Hitcho (鳴門秘帖, A Secret Record of Naruto; serialization concludes)
- Francis Brett Young – Portrait of Clare
- Arnold Zweig – The Case of Sergeant Grischa (Streit um den Sergeanten Grischa)

=== Children and young people ===
- Walter R. Brooks – To and Again (reissued 1949 as Freddy Goes to Florida, first of the Freddy the Pig series)
- Franklin W. Dixon – The Tower Treasure
- Will James – Smoky the Cowhorse
- May Justus – Peter Pocket: A Little Boy of the Cumberland Mountains
- John Masefield – The Midnight Folk
- A. A. Milne – Now We Are Six (verse)
- Edward Wyke Smith – The Marvellous Land of Snergs (proto-Hobbits)
- Ruth Plumly Thompson – The Gnome King of Oz (21st in the Oz series overall and the seventh written by her)
- Constancio C. Vigil
  - Botón Tolón
  - Cuentos para niños
  - La hormiguita viajera
  - Los escarabajos y la moneda de oro

=== Drama ===
- Isaac Babel – Sunset
- Philip Barry – Paris Bound
- Noel Pemberton Billing – High Treason
- Bertolt Brecht – In The Jungle of Cities (Im Dickicht der Städte in its final version)
- Mikhail Bulgakov – Flight («Бег», Beg, written)
- Noël Coward
  - Home Chat
  - The Marquise
- Hamilton Deane – Dracula (1927 revision of a 1924 stage adaptation)
- James Bernard Fagan – The Greater Love
- Federico García Lorca
  - Mariana Pineda
  - The Curse of the Butterfly (El Maleficio de la Mariposa) (first production, in Teatro Eslava, Madrid)
- Joseph Goebbels – Der Wanderer (only performances; written 1923)
- Walter Hackett – The Wicked Earl
- Oscar Hammerstein II (book & lyrics) – Show Boat (musical play adaptation)
- DuBose Heyward and Dorothy Heyward – Porgy
- Vsevolod Ivanov – Armoured Train 14-69 («Бронепоезд 14-69», Bronepoezd 14-69)
- Georgia Douglas Johnson – Plumes
- George S. Kaufman and Edna Ferber – The Royal Family
- John Howard Lawson – Loud Speaker
- Alexander Lernet-Holenia – Szene als Einleitung zu einer Totenfeier für Rainer Maria Rilke
- Frederick Lonsdale – The High Road
- W. Somerset Maugham – The Letter
- Harrison Owen – The Happy Husband
- Ernst Toller – Hoppla, We're Alive! (Hoppla, wir leben!)
- Ben Travers – Thark
- Jim Tully – Twenty Below
- John Van Druten
  - Chance Acquaintance
  - Diversion
- Bayard Veiller – The Trial of Mary Dugan
- Roger Vitrac – Les Mystères de l'amour (The Mysteries of Love)
- Frank Vosper – The Combined Maze
- Edgar Wallace
  - Double Dan
  - The Terror
- Emlyn Williams – Full Moon
- Carl Zuckmayer – Schinderhannes

=== Poetry ===
- Robert Desnos – La Liberté ou l'amour! (Liberty or Love!)
- Muhammad Iqbal – Zabur-i Ajam (Persian Psalms)
- James Joyce – Pomes Penyeach
- Don Marquis – archy and mehitabel

=== Non-fiction ===
- Nan Britton – The President's Daughter
- Alexandra David-Néel – Voyage d'une Parisienne à Lhassa (translated as My Journey to Lhasa)
- John Dewey – Philosophy and Civilization
- J. W. Dunne – An Experiment with Time
- Walter Evans-Wentz (translator) – The Tibetan Book of the Dead (translation of Bardo Thodol)
- E. M. Forster – Aspects of the Novel
- Sigmund Freud – The Future of an Illusion (Die Zukunft einer Illusion)
- Charles Homer Haskins - The Renaissance of the Twelfth Century
- Martin Heidegger – Being and Time (Sein und Zeit)
- Christopher Hussey – The Picturesque: Studies in a Point of View
- Ernst Kantorowicz – Frederick the Second (Kaiser Friedrich der Zweite)
- Ronald Knox - The Belief of Catholics
- John Livingston Lowes – The Road to Xanadu: A Study in the Ways of the Imagination
- Bertrand Russell – An Outline of Philosophy
- Helen Waddell – The Wandering Scholars

== Births ==
- January 8 – Charles Tomlinson, English poet (died 2015)
- January 16 – Oldřich Daněk, Czech dramatist (died 2000)
- January 24
  - Lasse Pöysti, Finnish writer, playwright and actor (died 2019)
  - Marvin Kaplan, American actor, screenwriter and playwright (died 2016)
- January 25 – John Calder, Canadian-born Scottish publisher (died 2018)
- January 28 – Vera Williams, American author and illustrator (died 2015)
- February 1 – Galway Kinnell, American poet (died 2014)
- February 6 – William Gardner Smith, expatriate American novelist and journalist (died 1974)
- February 16 – Shahidullah Kaiser, Bangladeshi novelist (died 1971)
- February 21 – Erma Bombeck, American humorist (died 1996)
- March 6 – Gabriel García Márquez, Colombian novelist (died 2014)
- March 15 – Hanns Joachim Friedrichs, German journalist (died 1995)
- March 18 – George Plimpton, American writer and actor (died 2003)
- March 24 – Martin Walser, German author (died 2023)
- March 22 – Vera Henriksen, née Roscher Lund, Norwegian historical novelist (died 2016)
- April 2 – Kenneth Tynan, English theatre critic (died 1980)
- April 24 – Trudi Birger, German Holocaust survivor and writer (died 2002)
- April 25 – Albert Uderzo, French author and illustrator (died 2020)
- May 1 – Tamar Bornstein-Lazar, Israeli children's writer (died 2020)
- May 7 – Ruth Prawer Jhabvala, British-American novelist and screenwriter (died 2013)
- May 10 – Nayantara Sahgal, Indian author
- May 19 – Yusuf Idris, Egyptian writer (died 1991)
- May 25 – Robert Ludlum, American novelist (died 2001)
- May 27 – Malayattoor Ramakrishnan, Indian Malayali novelist (died 1997)
- May 28 – William A. Hilliard, American journalist (died 2017)
- June 6 – Alan Seymour, Australian playwright (died 2015)
- June 1 – Moyra Caldecott, English writer of historical fiction (died 2015)
- June 13 – Paul Ableman, English writer of erotic fiction and playwright (died 2006)
- June 20 – Simin Behbahani, Persian poet (died 2014)
- June 23 – Jacobo Langsner, Romanian-born Uruguayan screenwriter and playwright (died 2020)
- June 24 – Frederick Vreeland, American diplomat and writer
- June 27 – Dominic Jeeva (டொமினிக் ஜீவா), Ceylonese Tamil fiction writer and essayist (died 2021)
- June 30 – James Goldman, American screenwriter and playwright (died 1998)
- July 4 – Neil Simon, American playwright (died 2018)
- July 15 – Ann Jellicoe, British playwright, stage director and actress (died 2017)
- July 16 – Shirley Hughes, English writer and illustrator of children's books (died 2022)
- July 22 – Katharine Topkins, American novelist
- July 27 – John Seigenthaler, American journalist, writer and political figure (died 2014)
- July 28
  - John Ashbery, American poet (d. 2017)
  - Pasquale Festa Campanile, Italian screenwriter, film director and novelist (died 1986)
- July 31 – Peter Nichols, English playwright (died 2019)
- August 9 – Robert Shaw, English-born actor, novelist and playwright (died 1978)
- August 15 – Patrick Galvin, Irish poet and dramatist (died 2011)
- August 17 – Stefan Geosits, Burgenland Croatian writer and translator (died 2022)
- August 23 – Dick Bruna, Dutch author and illustrator (died 2017)
- August 24 – David Ireland, Australian novelist (died 2022)
- August 27 – Fouad al-Tikerly, Iraqi novelist and writer (died 2008)
- September 4 – Bernardino Zapponi, Italian novelist (died 2000)
- September 30 – W. S. Merwin, American poet (died 2019)
- October 7 – Robert Westall, English novelist and children's writer (died 1993)
- October 16 – Günter Grass, German novelist (died 2015)
- October 31 – Sybil Wettasinghe, Ceylonese children's writer and illustrator (died 2020)
- November 2 – Steve Ditko, American comic-book writer and artist (died 2018)
- November 16 – Franz Jalics, Hungarian Jesuit priest and author (died 2021)
- November 24
  - Ahmadou Kourouma, Ivorian novelist (died 2003)
  - Charles Osborne, Australian-born British writer and arts administrator (died 2017)
- December 4 – Rafael Sánchez Ferlosio, Spanish writer (died 2019)
- December 13 – James Wright, American poet (died 1980)
- December 16 - Peter Dickinson, English author and poet (died 2015)
- December 24
  - Mary Higgins Clark, American novelist (died 2020)
  - Diane de Margerie, French translator (died 2023)

== Deaths ==
- January 4 – Süleyman Nazif, Turkish poet (born 1870)
- January 9 – Houston Stewart Chamberlain, English-born German author (b. 1855)
- January 21 – Margret Holmes Bates, American novelist and poet (born 1844)
- January 24 – Agnes Maule Machar, Canadian poet and author (born 1837)
- February 5 – Osório Duque-Estrada, Brazilian poet, essayist, journalist and literary critic (born 1870)
- February 26 – Alfred Remy, German-born American philologist and music writer (born 1870)
- February 27 – Roi Cooper Megrue, American playwright (b. 1882)
- March 3 – Mikhail Artsybashev, Russian writer (born 1878)
- March 10 – George W. Forbes, American journalist and librarian (born 1864)
- March 18 – Philip Wicksteed, English theologian and critic (born 1844)
- March 31 – Mabel Collins, British theosophist and author (born 1851)
- April 2 – Ottokár Prohászka, Hungarian Roman Catholic theologian and bishop (born 1858)
- April 16 – Gaston Leroux, French novelist (born 1868)
- April 17 – Florence Carpenter Dieudonné, American fantasy fiction writer (born 1850)
- April 19 – Minnie S. Davis, American author and mental scientist (born 1835)
- May 2 – Fukuda Hideko, Japanese feminist author (born 1865)
- May 20 – N. Samuel of Tranquebar, Ceylonese poet and author (born 1850)
- May 25 – Henri Hubert, French sociologist (born 1872)
- May 29 – Georges Eekhoud, Belgian novelist (born 1854)
- June 1 – J. B. Bury, Irish historian (born 1861)
- June 9 – Adolfo León Gómez, Colombian poet (born 1857)
- June 14 – Jerome K. Jerome, English humorous writer (born 1859)
- June 20 – Clara Louise Burnham, American novelist (born 1854)
- July 5 – Lesbia Harford, Australian poet (born 1891)
- July 16 – Emily Selinger, American author, painter, and educator (born 1848)
- July 17 – Harriet Earhart Monroe, American lecturer, educator, writer, producer (born 1842)
- July 24 – Ryūnosuke Akutagawa (芥川 龍之介), Japanese short story writer and poet (suicide, born 1892)
- July 26
  - Kazimir Barantsevich, Russian writer (born 1851)
  - Federico De Roberto, Italian novelist and dramatist (born 1861)
- August 13 – James Oliver Curwood, American novelist and conservationist (born 1878)
- August 24 – Manuel Díaz Rodríguez, Venezuelan writer (born 1871)
- September 14 – Hugo Ball, German poet (born 1886)
- September 15 – Herman Gorter, Dutch poet and socialist (born 1864)
- October 8
  - Ricardo Güiraldes, Argentine novelist and poet (Hodgkin's disease, born 1886)
  - Mary Webb, English novelist (born 1881)
- October 22 – Borisav Stanković, Serbian realist writer (born 1876)
- October 23 – Bernhard Alexander, Hungarian philosopher and polymath (born 1850)
- October 29 – Hermann Muthesius, German architect and author (born 1861)
- November 23 – Stanisław Przybyszewski, Polish novelist, dramatist, and poet (born 1868)
- December 5 – Fyodor Sologub, Russian dramatist and essayist (born 1863)
- December 17 – Hubert Harrison, African-American writer, critic, and activist (born 1883)
- date unknown – Emma Scarr Booth, British-born American novelist and poet (born 1835)

== Awards ==
- James Tait Black Memorial Prize for fiction: Francis Brett Young, The Portrait of Clare
- James Tait Black Memorial Prize for biography: H. A. L. Fisher, James Bryce, Viscount Bryce of Dechmont, O.M.
- Newbery Medal for children's literature: Will James, Smoky the Cow Horse
- Newdigate Prize for poetry: G. E. Trevelyan, Julia, Daughter of Claudius (first female winner)
- Nobel Prize for Literature: Henri Bergson
- Prix Goncourt: Maurice Bedel, Jérôme 60° latitude nord
- Pulitzer Prize for Drama: Paul Green, In Abraham's Bosom
- Pulitzer Prize for Poetry: Leonora Speyer, Fiddler's Farewell
- Pulitzer Prize for the Novel: Louis Bromfield, Early Autumn
