= Nicolas Grenier =

Nicolas Grenier may refer to:

- Nicolas Grenier (poet)
- Nicolas Grenier (artist)
