= Muriel Herbert =

British composer

Muriel Emily Herbert (1897 – 1 May 1984) was a British composer of the early 20th century. Much of her work is for solo voice and piano, with art song settings of texts by English and Irish poets such as Thomas Hardy, Robert Herrick, Ben Jonson, James Joyce, and W. B. Yeats.

== Early life ==
Herbert was born in 1897, in Sheffield, and grew up in Liverpool, England. She was the youngest child and only daughter. Herbert grew up singing and playing music in her home, as her mother was the church choir director. Her older brother, Percy, was also a musician and encouraged Herbert to study music, for which she had a natural ability.

Herbert began writing down songs for voice and piano at a young age. Her father died in 1909, and the Herbert family struggled with poverty. Hugh Farrie, a journalist for the Liverpool Post, encouraged Herbert to become a concert pianist, but her interest was in composition.

== Education ==
In 1917, Herbert received the Liverpool scholarship and attended the Royal College of Music in London. She studied with Irish composer, Charles Stanford, and when World War I ended she stayed near London, taught at Wycombe Abbey School for girls, gave private lessons, performed recitals, and continued developing her musical abilities.

In the early 1920s she met Roger Quilter, who viewed her works favourably and recommended them to the publisher Augener, who even signed the contract as a witness. Augener published the songs "Beauty", "Cradle Song", "Loveliest of Trees", "Renouncement", and "When Death to Either Shall Come" in 1923, and "Autumn", "Most Holy Night", and "Have you seen but a white lily grow" in 1926. Later, Robert Elkin published some of Herbert's other art songs and two works for violin and piano ("Giboulée" and "Enchanted April").

== Marriage and Paris ==
In 1925, after marrying a young French academic, Emile Delavenay, Herbert traveled to Paris for her honeymoon. Here she was introduced to James Joyce by Emile's friend, the Irish poet Tom McGreevey. Herbert played and sang her versions of Joyce's poems, "I hear an army charging" and "Lean out of the window". Later, Joyce gave her inscribed copies of his poetry collections, Chamber Music and Pomes Penyeach, as well as permission to publish her settings of his texts.

== Later career and rediscovery ==
Although Herbert had received an honorary A.R.C.M. by the Royal College and had given occasional broadcasts of her vocal music for the BBC much of her music has remained rarely performed. Through the efforts of a former student, Bill Lloyd, and Herbert's daughter, Claire Tomalin, Herbert's music has begun to be performed and recorded. In 2008, James Gilchrist, tenor, Ailish Tynan, soprano, and David Owen Norris, piano recorded 36 of Herbert's art songs with Linn Records. Arthur Keegan has arranged her Hardy setting "Faintheart in a Railway Train" for chamber ensemble. Her songs are being republished by BiblioFox Music Publishing.

== Selected works ==
Voice and piano

- "Autumn" (Walter de la Mare) [1924]
- "Beauty" (John Masefield)
- "Carry on" (Cecil Edric Mornington Roberts)
- Children's Songs (Ada Harrison) [1938]
  - "Merry-go-round"
  - "The Gypsies"
  - "The Tadpole"
  - "Jack Spratt"
  - "Acorn and Willow"
  - "The Bunny"
- "Contentment" (C. L. Lanyon)
- "Cradle Song" (A.C. Swinburne) [1922]
- "Faintheart in a Railway Train" (Thomas Hardy) [after 1925]
- "Fountain Court" Arthur Symons [1927]
- "Have you seen but a white lily grow?" (Ben Jonson) [1924, unpublished]
- "Hips and Haws" (The Days of November) (Ada Harrison) [early 1940s]
- "Horsemen" (Gerald Gould) [1926, unpublished]
- "How beautiful is night" (Robert Southey) [1918]
- "I cannot lose thee for a day" (George Meredith)
- "I dare not ask a kiss" (Robert Herrick) [no date]
- "I hear an army charging" (from Chamber Music) (James Joyce) [1928]
- "I think on thee in the night" (Thomas K. Hervey) [before 1917, unpublished]
- "In the Days of November" (Ada Harrison) [1943, unpublished]
- "Jenny kiss'd me" (Leigh Hunt) [1921]
- "Jock o' Hazeldean" (Sir Walter Scott)
- "Jour des Morts" (Cimetière Montparnasse) (Charlotte Mew) [1922]
- "Lean out of the window" (from Chamber Music) (James Joyce) [1928]
- "Love's Secret" (William Blake) [1928]
- "Loveliest of Trees" (A.E. Housman) [1923]
- Medieval Latin Lyrics, translated by Helen Waddell [1930s]
  - "David's Lament for Jonathan" (Peter Abelard) [1936]
  - "So by my singing am I comforted" (MS. of Benedictbeuern) (from Carmina Burana) [1934]
  - "The Lost Nightingale" (Alcuin) [1938-9]
- "Most Holy Night" (Hilaire Belloc) [1924, published 1926]
- "My lady" (C. Hornby)
- "New shoes" (Doris Caroline Abrahams)
- "On a Time" (Anon – John Attye's First Book of Airs) [1935]
- "On the Road" (Anon) [1922 or 1923]
- "Renouncement" (Alice Meynell) [1923]
- "Rose kissed me today" (Austin Dobson) [1919]
- "She weeps over Rahoon" (from Pomes Penyeach) (James Joyce) [1929]
- "Sing unto the Lord all the earth" (The Bible)
- "Song – I cannot lose thee for a day" (George Meredith) [1927]
- "Stars of the summer night" (Henry Wadsworth Longfellow)
- "Tewkesbury Road" (John Masefield) [1919]
- "The Crimson Rose" (Enid Clay) [1928]
- "The faithless shepherdess"
- "The Lake Isle of Innisfree" (W. B. Yeats) [1928]
- "The song of the bullet" (Bret Harte)
- "To Daffodils" (Robert Herrick) [1916]
- "Violets" (George Meredith) [1927]
- "When Death to either shall come" (Robert Bridges) [1923]

Children's operettas

- Candy Floss [1964] pub. Elkin
- Christmas Eve's Dream [1963] pub. Elkin
- Come to the Zoo [1962] pub. Elkin

Violin and piano

- "Enchanted April"
- "Giboulée"
