= Double Cross Purposes =

1937 novel

- Author: Ronald Knox
- Language: English
- Series: Miles Bredon
- Genre: Detective
- Publisher: Hodder and Stoughton
- Publication date: 1937
- Publication place: United Kingdom
- Media type: Print
- Preceded by: Still Dead

Double Cross Purposes is a 1937 mystery detective novel by the British author Ronald Knox. It is the fifth and last in his series of novels featuring the insurance investigator Miles Bredon, one of the Golden Age Detectives. Like the previous novel it takes place in Scotland. It features several characters who appeared in earlier novels, including the schoolmaster Edward Pulteney whose skills at fishing come in useful to Bredon. While Knox continued to write prolifically for many years, this remained his last novel in the detective genre.

== Synopsis ==
Publicity-hungry bright young thing Vernon Lethaby announces to the newspapers that he will be undertaking a treasure hunt in the Scottish Highlands on a deserted island where local legend holds that the Jacobite Charles Edward Stuart stashed many valuables when he was on the run following his death at the Battle of Culloden in 1746. Having enlisted the assistance of a tough, mysterious colonial named Digger Henderson, Lethaby rents the island to try and hunt for the treasure, believing that an antique map he knows of may help them. Suspicious of his companion Henderson, however, he takes out an insurance policy with the Indescribable Insurance Company against his companion fleeing with the loot. Meanwhile the local landowner has also taken out a policy to protect himself from any chicanery.

Bredon is dispatched by his superiors to keep an eye on events, taking with him his wife Angela and their old acquaintance Edward Pulteney whose interest in salmon fishing provides good cover watching the goings on on the island. Not long after they arrive, a miraculous discovery is made of a chest containing what appears to be Jacobite valuables. Before an expert can arrive from Inverness, apparent tragedy strikes when the garage on the island catches fire. While Bredon is able to hurry and save Lethaby, it seems Henderson has been burned to death. However, strange occurrences in the following days lead him to believe that all is not as simple as he first thought.

== Reception ==
Writing in The Guardian reviewer and fellow author E.R. Punshon noted that Knox "proves again that he possesses a style to which any young writer might do well to play the sedulous ape as well as an abundant wit. But only writers of the highest order have all talents in equal measure, and Father Knox falls a little short in his power of creating character, as also in that direct and clear sense of narrative which many lesser writers possess, that gift which explains how it is that some apparently commonplace authors achieve a success that many learned critics find incomprehensible".

== Bibliography ==
- Barzun, Jacques & Taylor, Wendell Hertig. A Catalogue of Crime. Harper & Row, 1989.
- Corbishley, Thomas. Ronald Knox, the Priest. Sheed and Ward, 1965.
- Hubin, Allen J. Crime Fiction, 1749–1980: A Comprehensive Bibliography. Garland Publishing, 1984.
- Magill, Frank Northen. Critical Survey of Mystery and Detective Fiction: Authors, Volume 3. Salem Press, 1988.
- Reilly, John M. Twentieth Century Crime & Mystery Writers. Springer, 2015.
- Rooney, David. The Wine of Certitude: A Literary Biography of Ronald Knox. Ignatius Press, 2014.
