= The Body in the Silo =

1933 novel by Ronald Knox

- Author: Ronald Knox
- Language: English
- Series: Miles Bredon
- Genre: Detective
- Publisher: Hodder and Stoughton
- Publication date: 1933
- Publication place: United Kingdom
- Media type: Print
- Preceded by: The Footsteps at the Lock
- Followed by: Still Dead

The Body in the Silo is a 1933 detective novel by the British author Ronald Knox. It is the third in a series of five novels featuring the insurance investigator Miles Bredon, one of the many detectives of the Golden Age of Detective Fiction. It is a country house mystery taking place in Herefordshire close to the Welsh border. It was published in the United States by Dutton under the alternative title Settled Out of Court.

== Synopsis ==
Bredon and his wife are invited to join a country house party of the Hallifords, a couple they have recently met. Reluctant to go he is persuaded to by his wife, but finds the company of his hosts and the various other guests unsettling. Not long after they have arrived it is suggested that they all play the eloping game, a variation of a scavenger hunt, which involves a midnight chase across country by car. After returning back the guests return to their beds. In the morning it is discovered that one of them Cecil Worsley, who did not take part in the game, has been found dead in the vary tall silo on the estate. Used to create Silage, Worsley has very obviously been overpowered by fumes in either a tragic accident or suicide.

However, despite the inquest ruling it as an accident, the newspapers and Scotland Yard believe that some foul play may have taken place. Worsley was an influential figure, well-connected in government. As he had a small life insurance policy with Bredon's employer, the Indescribable Insurance Company, he reluctantly agrees to stay on and keep his eyes open to see if he can ferret out information to slip to his old friend Leyland of Scotland Yard. He becomes convinced that the eloping game was a deliberate ploy to empty the house entirely of guests in order to commit the crime, but comes to doubt whether Worsley was really the intended target.

== Bibliography ==
- Barzun, Jacques & Taylor, Wendell Hertig. A Catalogue of Crime. Harper & Row, 1989.
- Corbishley, Thomas. Ronald Knox, the Priest. Sheed and Ward, 1965.
- Hubin, Allen J. Crime Fiction, 1749-1980: A Comprehensive Bibliography. Garland Publishing, 1984.
- Magill, Frank Northen . Critical Survey of Mystery and Detective Fiction: Authors, Volume 3. Salem Press, 1988.
- Reilly, John M. Twentieth Century Crime & Mystery Writers. Springer, 2015.
- Rooney, David. The Wine of Certitude: A Literary Biography of Ronald Knox. Ignatius Press, 2014.
- Shaw, Bruce. Jolly Good Detecting: Humor in English Crime Fiction of the Golden Age. McFarland, 2013.
