= Still Dead =

1934 novel

- Author: Ronald Knox
- Language: English
- Series: Miles Bredon
- Genre: Detective
- Publisher: Hodder and Stoughton
- Publication date: 1934
- Publication place: United Kingdom
- Media type: Print
- Preceded by: The Body in the Silo
- Followed by: Double Cross Purposes

Still Dead is a 1934 mystery detective novel by the British author Ronald Knox. It is the fourth in a series of five novels featuring the insurance investigator Miles Bredon, one of the many detectives of the Golden Age of Detective Fiction. It was published in London by Hodder and Stoughton and in New York by Dutton.

== Synopsis ==
In the Scottish Highlands Colin Reiver, the feckless son of the laird, is involved in a tragic incident while drunk driving a local boy is knocked down and killed. Despite being cleared by the authorities, he is filled with remorse and plans to go away to join the French Foreign Legion. Due to his bad health, excarbated by his heavy drinking, his family instead convince him to go on an ocean cruise.

Several weeks later the head gamekeeper rushes to the house claiming that he has seen Colin's dead body by the roadside. Just minutes later the corpse has apparently disappeared. Its appearance is attributed to the gamekeeper's second sight in foreseeing the death of the heir to the estate, particularly when Colin's body is discovered on exactly the same sport forty eight hours later dead from exposure.

As their remains doubt exactly when he died, and therefore whether the life insurance on his is valid, the Indescribable Insurance Company send in their private investigator to untangle the mystery. Although he is tasked principally to discover when Colin died, he soon becomes as much focused on why and where he was killed.

== Bibliography ==
- Barzun, Jacques & Taylor, Wendell Hertig. A Catalogue of Crime. Harper & Row, 1989.
- Corbishley, Thomas. Ronald Knox, the Priest. Sheed and Ward, 1965.
- Hubin, Allen J. Crime Fiction, 1749-1980: A Comprehensive Bibliography. Garland Publishing, 1984.
- Reilly, John M. Twentieth Century Crime & Mystery Writers. Springer, 2015.
- Rooney, David. The Wine of Certitude: A Literary Biography of Ronald Knox. Ignatius Press, 2014.
- Shaw, Bruce. Jolly Good Detecting: Humor in English Crime Fiction of the Golden Age. McFarland, 2013.
