= Chamber Music (Berio) =

Composition by Luciano Berio

- by Luciano Berio
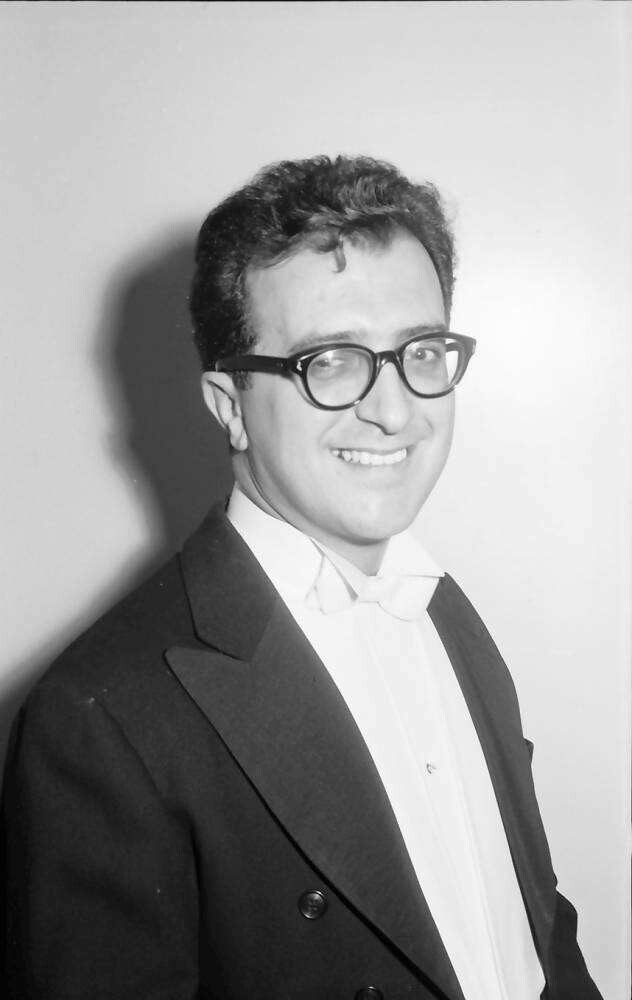
- Berio in Darmstadt, in 1959
- Text: poems from Chamber Music by James Joyce
- Composed: 1953
- Scoring: female voice; clarinet; cello; harp

Chamber Music is a composition in three sections for female voice, clarinet, cello and harp by Luciano Berio. It is a setting of three poems from the collection of poetry Chamber Music by James Joyce, whose work was to be a frequent source for Berio. The songs were composed in 1953, and show the influence of Luigi Dallapiccola with whom Berio had studied in 1952 at the Tanglewood Music Center.

About his composition Berio said that,

[a]s often happens to me with important encounters, I reacted to Dallapiccola with four works: Due pezzi, for violin and piano, Cinque variazioni, for piano (based upon the three-note melodic cell—"fratello"[014]—from Il prigioniero), Chamber Music (setting poems by Joyce) and Variazione, for chamber orchestra. With these pieces I entered Dallapiccola's "melodic" world, but they also allowed me to escape from it. (Berio, Dalmonte & Varga 1985, p. 53)
