= Halloween Jack =

Halloween Jack may refer to:

- Halloween Jack, a persona of David Bowie introduced in 1974 with the album Diamond Dogs
- Halloween Jack (comics), Marvel Comics character in works in the Marvel 2099 series
- Halloween Jack, titular antagonist of films directed by Andrew Jones (filmmaker), namely The Legend Of Halloween Jack (2018) and its sequel
- Jack O'The Lantern, folkloric figure associated with Halloween

== See also ==
- Jack Skellington, protagonist of The Nightmare Before Christmas and resident of Halloween Town
- Jack-o'-lantern (disambiguation)
