= The Footsteps at the Lock =

1928 novel

- Author: Ronald Knox
- Language: English
- Series: Miles Bredon
- Genre: Detective
- Publisher: Methuen
- Publication date: 1928
- Publication place: United Kingdom
- Media type: Print
- Preceded by: The Three Taps
- Followed by: The Body in the Silo

The Footsteps at the Lock is a 1928 detective novel by the British author Ronald Knox. Written during the Golden Age of Detective Fiction it is one of five books featuring his insurance investigator Miles Bredon. The author was very familiar with the area of western Oxfordshire, where much of the novel takes place.

== Synopsis ==
Derek Burtell is due to inherit £50,000 when he reaches his twenty fifth birthday. In the meantime he has run up huge debts in anticipation of the inheritance, fuelled by his drug addiction. His creditors demand he take out life insurance to safeguard their claim should he die before the date of the inheritance. The physician who examines him instructs him to take some exercise to improve his health, as his dissolute lifestyle has left him with a very weak heart. He recommends a trip along the River Thames.

To widespread surprise Derek takes his cousin Nigel, an undergraduate at Oxford University who he has long despised, on his canoeing expedition to the upper reaches of the Thames between Lechlade and Oxford. Shortly after passing through Shipcote Lock, Nigel leaves his cousin to briefly attend to some business in Oxford. When he later returns to meet Derek at a pub a little further onwards he does not arrive. A search reveals the canoe, with a hole in it, and no sign of Derek. The Indescribable Insurance Company which will have to pay out if has died, calls in Miles Bredon. With the assistance of his wife Angela and his friend Leyland of Scotland Yard he sets out to untangle the puzzle.

== Bibliography ==
- Barzun, Jacques & Taylor, Wendell Hertig. A Catalogue of Crime. Harper & Row, 1989.
- Corbishley, Thomas. Ronald Knox, the Priest. Sheed and Ward, 1965.
- Hubin, Allen J. Crime Fiction, 1749-1980: A Comprehensive Bibliography. Garland Publishing, 1984.
- Reilly, John M. Twentieth Century Crime & Mystery Writers. Springer, 2015.
- Rooney, David. The Wine of Certitude: A Literary Biography of Ronald Knox. Ignatius Press, 2014. ISBN 978-1-68149-571-2.
- Shaw, Bruce. Jolly Good Detecting: Humor in English Crime Fiction of the Golden Age. McFarland, 2013. ISBN 978-0-7864-7886-6.
