= The Three Taps =

1927 novel

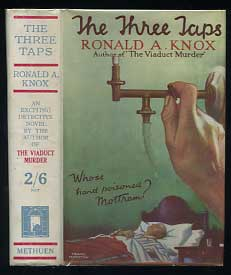
- Author: Ronald Knox
- Language: English
- Series: Miles Bredon
- Genre: Detective
- Publisher: Methuen
- Publication date: 1927
- Publication place: United Kingdom
- Media type: Print
- Followed by: The Footsteps at the Lock

The Three Taps is a 1927 detective novel by the British author Ronald Knox. Written during the Golden Age of Detective Fiction, it is the first in a series of five novels featuring the insurance investigator Miles Bredon. It has been suggested that Knox's portrayal of Miles Bredon and his wife Angela as a crime-solving couple may have influenced Nick and Nora Charles's creation of The Thin Man. It was published in London by Methuen and in New York by Simon and Schuster. In 1930 the author was one of the founders of the Detection Club.

== Synopsis ==
Mottram, a wealthy businessman from the industrial town of Pullford in the Midlands, has a life insurance policy worth half a million pounds with the Indescribable Insurance Company of London. When Mottram's body is found gassed in the room he is staying in for a trout fishing holiday on the village of Chilthorpe about twenty miles away from Pullford, the Indescribable send in Bredon in the hope he will prove it is suicide and avoid a large payout. Meanwhile, his old friend Inspector Leyland of Scotland Yard arrives. While Bredon draws the conclusion that it was suicide, Leyland is convinced that is murder and begins to home in on suspects who include the dead man's secretary and his estranged nephew.

== Bibliography ==
- Bargainnier, Earl F. Comic Crime. Popular Press, 1987.
- Barzun, Jacques & Taylor, Wendell Hertig. A Catalogue of Crime. Harper & Row, 1989.
- Corbishley, Thomas. Ronald Knox, the Priest. Sheed and Ward, 1965.
- Hubin, Allen J. Crime Fiction, 1749-1980: A Comprehensive Bibliography. Garland Publishing, 1984.
- Reilly, John M. Twentieth Century Crime & Mystery Writers. Springer, 2015.
- Rooney, David. The Wine of Certitude: A Literary Biography of Ronald Knox. Ignatius Press, 2014.
- Shaw, Bruce. Jolly Good Detecting: Humor in English Crime Fiction of the Golden Age. McFarland, 2013.
