= Jack-o'-lantern (disambiguation) =

A jack-o'-lantern is a decoratively carved and internally lit pumpkin or turnip. associated with Halloween

Jack-o'-lantern may also refer to:

== Customs and folklore ==
- Jack O'The Lantern, figure in Irish folklore now associated with Halloween, a.k.a. the Smith, Stingy Jack, or Drunk Jack
- Will-o'-the-wisp or ignis fatuus, an unearthly light which attracts travellers in English folklore

== Arts, entertainment, and media ==
=== Fictional entities ===
- Jack O'Lantern (DC Comics), several DC Comics superheroes
- Jack O'Lantern (Marvel Comics), several Marvel Comics supervillains
- Pyro Jack, sometimes called Jack O'Lantern, a demon found in the series of games Shin Megami Tensei

=== Other arts, entertainment, and media ===
- Jack O'Lantern (musical), a 1917 Broadway musical
- Jack O'Lantern (novel), a 1929 thriller novel by George Goodchild
- Jack O'Lantern (film), a 2004 film
- Dartmouth Jack-O-Lantern, a magazine

== Other uses ==
- Omphalotus olearius mushroom, commonly known as the jack-o-lantern mushroom

== See also ==
- Halloween Jack (disambiguation)
