= The Public Defender (film) =

1931 film

- Film poster
- Directed by: J. Walter Ruben; James Anderson (assistant)
- Written by: George Goodchild; Bernard Schubert
- Produced by: William LeBaron; Louis Sarecky
- Starring: Richard Dix; Shirley Grey
- Cinematography: Edward Cronjager
- Edited by: Archie Marshek
- Distributed by: RKO Radio Pictures
- Release dates: July 31, 1931 (Premiere-New York City); August 1, 1931 (U.S.)
- Running time: 69 minutes
- Country: United States
- Language: English

The Public Defender is a 1931 American pre-Code crime film directed by J. Walter Ruben, starring Richard Dix and featuring Boris Karloff.

== Plot ==
Rich playboy Pike Winslow dons the mantle of 'The Reckoner', a mysterious avenger, when he learns that his lady friend Barbara Gerry's father has been framed in a bank embezzlement scandal. Using meticulous planning and split-second timing, Pike, along with his associates, the erudite 'Professor' and tough-guy scrapper 'Doc', attempt to find proof that will clear Gerry and identify the real culprits.

== Cast ==
- Richard Dix as Pike Winslow
- Shirley Grey as Barbara Gerry
- Purnell Pratt as John Kirk
- Ruth Weston as Rose Harmer
- Edmund Breese as Frank Wells
- Frank Sheridan as Charles Harmer
- Alan Roscoe as Inspector Malcolm O'Neil
- Boris Karloff as 'Professor'
- Nella Walker as Aunt Matilda
- Paul Hurst as 'Doc'
- Carl Gerard as Cyrus Pringle
- Robert Emmett O'Connor as Detective Brady
- Phillips Smalley as Thomas Drake (as Phillip Smalley)

== See also ==
- Boris Karloff filmography
