= Indian Tales =

1953 book by Jaime de Angulo

- First edition
- Author: Jaime de Angulo
- Illustrator: Jaime de Angulo
- Genre: folktales, children's literature
- Publisher: A.A. Wyn; Hill & Wang (p/b, 1954)
- Publication date: 1953
- Media type: hardcover paperback mass market paperback

Indian Tales is a collection of connected short narratives written and illustrated by Jaime de Angulo, with a foreword by Carl Carmer. It was published by A. A. Wyn in 1953. The book is an imaginative retelling of many of the folktales and myths collected by de Angulo as an erstwhile anthropologist. The Indian Tales were originally read live on Pacifica Radio station KPFA-FM, Berkeley in 1949, and were then released as a recording.

The stories revolve around an anthropomorphic animal family traveling across California, and encountering various mythological figures, such as Old Man Coyote, Loon Woman, and various animal tribes who live as the indigenous peoples of California did in pre-European times. They are written to be of interest to younger readers, but are also enjoyed by adults. The book has been used as a text in California history classes.

De Angulo writes in the foreword:

"When you find yourself searching for some mechanical explanation, if you don't know the answer, invent one. When you pick out some inconsistency or marvelous improbability, satisfy your curiosity like the old Indian folk: 'Well, that's the way they tell that story. I didn't make it up!'"

== Reception ==
Poet Marianne Moore wrote, "I am charmed by the book — text and pictures. It is no effort, of course, to be pleased by the sure touch — stories and animal drawings that are poetry, innate, humor-born, and wise."

== Publication history ==
- Hill & Wang (1954), first paperback edition, reprinted numerous times through the next 40 years, by successive imprints Farrar, Straus and North Point Press
- Heinemann (1954) (as Red Indian Tales)
- Ballantine Books (1974), first mass market paperback edition, ISBN 978-0345252753
- Heyday Books (2003) California Legacy Project edition, ISBN 978-1890771669
