= Condemned to Death =

1932 British film by Walter Forde

- French poster for the film
- Directed by: Walter Forde
- Written by: H. Fowler Mear; Bernard Merivale; Brock Williams
- Based on: Jack O'Lantern by James Dawson and George Goodchild
- Produced by: Julius Hagen
- Starring: Arthur Wontner; Gillian Lind; Gordon Harker; Cyril Raymond
- Cinematography: Sydney Blythe; William Luff
- Edited by: Jack Harris
- Music by: Baynham Honri
- Production company: Twickenham Film Studios
- Distributed by: Woolf & Freedman Film Service
- Release date: 30 May 1932
- Running time: 75 minutes
- Country: United Kingdom
- Language: English

Condemned to Death is a 1932 British crime film directed by Walter Forde and starring Arthur Wontner, Gillian Lind and Gordon Harker. It was adapted by H. Fowler Mear, Bernard Merivale and Brock Williams from the 1931 play Jack O'Lantern by James Dawson which was itself based on the 1929 novel by George Goodchild.

== Preservation status ==
Thought to have been lost, a cut version dubbed into French was found as a result of a 1992 British Film Institute campaign to locate missing movies.

== Plot ==
A respected judge leads a double life as a murderer.

== Cast ==
- Arthur Wontner as Sir Charles Wallington
- Gillian Lind as Kate Banting
- Gordon Harker as Sam Knudge
- Cyril Raymond as Jim Wrench
- Jane Welsh as Sonia Wallington
- Norah Howard as Gwen Banting
- Edmund Gwenn as Banting
- Griffith Humphreys as Professor Michaels
- T. Gordon Blythe as Ali
- James Cunningham as Inspector Sweeting
- Gilbert Davis as Doctor Cornell
- Bernard Brunel as Tobias Lantern
- H. St. Barbe West as Sir Rudolph Cantler

== Reception ==
Film Weekly wrote: "A vain romance runs through the theme, but it is nebulous rather than active, the action being mostly confined in the disastrous consequences which follow the murderer's eerie influence. Walter Forde's direction is patchy, and the film is weakened by the poor performances of Cyril Raymond, Gillian Lind and Jane Welch."

Kine Weekly wrote: "This arresting murder mystery drama is, when you get down to fundamentals, an extravagant study in posthumous hypnotism, but its fantastic theme is presented with such conviction that tension is always held. Walter Forde has handled his plot cleverly, and it is this, together with sterling characterisations by a strong cast, that results in a convincing atmosphere. ... Arthur Wontner plays the dual personality role with skill and understanding, and always retains a cultivated sense of dignity. Cyril Raymond is well cast as Wrench, Edmund Gwenn and Gordon Harker are excellent as two hardened criminals, Griffiths Humphreys convinces as the professor, and Jane Welsh and Gillian Lind are both good in the only feminine roles."

The Daily Film Renter wrote: "Good thriller, deviating from worn track of murder mysteries, and likely to please generally. Arthur Wontner is star player, and exercises himself comfortably in a sort of Jekyll-and-Hyde role. The somewhat different angles of this mystery show make it a definitely good booking for all 'A' audiences."
