= Jack O'Lantern (novel) =

1929 novel

- First US edition
- Author: George Goodchild
- Language: English
- Genre: Thriller
- Publisher: Hodder and Stoughton (UK); Mystery League (US)
- Publication date: 1929
- Publication place: United Kingdom
- Media type: Print

Jack O'Lantern is a 1929 mystery thriller novel by the British writer George Goodchild. Goodchild was a prolific writer of thrillers in the style of Edgar Wallace and Sydney Horler. It was published in the United States the following year by The Mystery League. Another of his novels The Monster of Grammont was published by them in 1931.

== Synopsis ==
Detectives from Scotland Yard attempt to track down a mysterious killer terrorising London, known only as "Jack O'Lantern".

== Film adaptation ==
It was adapted into a 1931 West End play of the same title and subsequently into the 1932 film Condemned to Death directed by Walter Forde and starring Arthur Wontner, Gillian Lind and Gordon Harker.

== Bibliography ==
- Goble, Alan. The Complete Index to Literary Sources in Film. Walter de Gruyter, 1999.
- Kabatchnik, Amnon. Blood on the Stage, 1925-1950: Milestone Plays of Crime, Mystery and Detection. Scarecrow Press, 2010.
