= Lucy Shepard Freeland =

American linguist (1890–1972)

Lucy Shepard Freeland (1890–1972) was an American linguist who pioneered the study of Miwok languages. Though she adopted the name Nancy in everyday life, she continued to publish as L. S. Freeland. A student of Alfred Kroeber, she was married to the writer Jaime de Angulo from 1923 to 1943, and the pair collaborated on studies of Native Californians in the 1920s and 1930s. Freeland's Languages of the Sierra Miwok (1951) has been praised as "one of the finest grammars of any California Indian language". The book contains the earliest known use of the term code-switching.

== Works ==
- "Pomo Doctors and Poisoners". American Archaeology and Ethnology, Vol. 20, No. 4 (1923), pp. 57–73
- (with Jaime de Angulo) "Notes on the Northern Paiute of California". Journal de la Société des Américanistes, Vol. 21, No. 2 (1929). pp. 313–335
- (with Jame de Angulo) "The Achumawi language". International Journal of American Linguistics, Vol. 6, No. 2 (1930), pp. 77–120
- (with Jame de Angulo) "Karok Texts". International Journal of American Linguistics, Vol. 6, No. 3-4 (1931), pp. 194–226
- (with Jame de Angulo) "The Lutuami Language (Klamath-Modoc)". Journal de la Société des Américanistes, Vol. 23 (1931), pp. 1–45
- (with Jame de Angulo) "Miwok and Pomo Myths". Journal of American Folk-Lore, Vol. 41, No.160 (1928), pp. 232–252
- (with Jame de Angulo) "A New Religious Movement in North-Central California". American Anthropologist, Vol. 31, No. 2 (1929), pp. 265–270
- "Western Miwok Texts with Linguistic Sketch". International Journal of American Linguistics, Vol. 13, No. 1 (January 1947), pp. 31–46
- Language of the Sierra Miwok. Baltimore: Waverly Press, Inc., 1951.
- (with Sylvia M. Broadbent) Central Sierra Miwok Dictionary, with Texts. Berkeley: University of California Press, 1960.
