= The Lariat =

1927 book by Jaime de Angulo

- Author: Jaime de Angulo
- Language: English
- Publication date: 1927

The Lariat is a 1927 short novel by the poet and anthropologist Jaime de Angulo, set in Spanish California. It is reprinted in Bob Callahan, ed. A Jaime de Anglo Reader (Turtle Island Books, 1974).

== Plot summary ==
The Lariat is a story told through myriad voices with frequently shifting verb tenses, ultimately dissolving into a patchwork collection of scenes and impressions. Sometimes, we hear the voice of an unknown historian/narrator attempting to piece together the life of protagonist Fray Luis through family records and Luis's own diary entries. At other times the story is told in the present tense, using the voices of talking animals.

Through these voices emerges the story of Fray Luis, a Spanish Franciscan friar with a wild secular past, who comes to Mission Carmel in Northern California with the goal of converting the local Native Americans to Christianity. The reader learns that the Esselen Indians are notoriously difficult to convert. Fray Luis, however, is able to convert a single Esselen girl who voluntarily comes to the Mission, and from her he learns the Esselen language. She was the wife of a medicine man, Hualala, whom she left after their son died. Ruiz, a Mestizo vaquero associated with the Mission, begins a covert relationship with the Esselen girl, sneaking her out of the nunnery at night. Ruiz makes plans with Mission leader Fray Bernardo to marry the girl, but Fray Luis, who envies Ruiz, does not want this to happen. It is ambiguous whether this is because she is Luis's convert and he claims her spiritually, or whether his sense of spiritual ownership has developed into a sexual desire for her.

Fray Luis goes to Hualala's funeral, where he is involuntarily involved in a ceremony to relieve the Esselen community of the burdon of the death. A mouse takes pity of Fray Luis and attempts to help him, but he refuses to be led by the mouse. Fray Luis ends up living for a few weeks at the house of Esteban, Ruiz's Spanish father. Ruiz decides that he wants to kill the bear that has been eating their cattle, and asks the Mission Indian Saturnino to make him a lariat. Saturnino, who hates Ruiz, uses a piece of Fray Luis's monk's cord to weave a lariat. The lariat looks and feels perfect but its integrity is compromised by the addition of the cord, so it does not work properly when the time comes. Ruiz hunts down the bear with his cousin, Pawi. When Ruiz throws his lariat around the bear, the lariat becomes entangled in the saddle, and while Pawi's arrows bounce off the bear, the bear kills Ruiz.

Fray Luis attempts to leave Mission Carmel on his donkey, but it transforms into a beetle and carries him down a ladder into a ceremonial hut, where a medicine man seems to transform into a bear. As Fray Luis flees back up the ladder that goes out the hole in the center of the hut, he puts his head through the loop of a waiting lariat, and is hung. It is ambiguous whether he was tricked, or has committed suicide.

The narrative is open to interpretation. The chapter titles provide clues, though sometimes they do not seem directly connected to their context ("Fray Luis tries to double-cross the Devil," for example). By using information provided in the first chapter to decipher the titles' meanings, the reader can more fully grasp what is taking place in the often confusing final chapters of this text.

== Physical and cultural setting ==
Halfway down the slope, a little flat, with a few Indian huts, and a small house of logs and adobe, with a chimney. Below, a condor is soaring around and around.

The Mission was a little town surrounded by a wall. Besides the church, there were the Indian quarters for the unmarried men, the Indian quarters for the girls (also called the nunnery), the pozoleria or kitchen where the mush was cooked in a great cauldron, the carpenter shop, various storerooms. One corner of the great courtyard was occupied by a crew of Indians making adobe bricks, and was known as the adoberia.

There is a lot of "mixing" of opposites in this story that is a direct result of the physical and cultural setting: Catholic and Animist practice, Native American and European reminiscent of Estela Portillo Trambley’s "The Burning" which juxtaposes Europe versus the New World, aristocracy and peasantry, light and dark, justice and evil. The reata (or lariat) is functionally compromised when two elements are intertwined: Fray Luis’s monk’s cord and the leather from Saturnino’s reata. The elements are metaphorically Catholicism and Animism – suggesting that the two cannot function together.

== Major characters ==
Fray Luis: A Franciscan friar from "Old Spain" who ends up at Mission Carmel in California. His job is to help save the "pagan" Indians' souls. He speaks Spanish and Sextapay, among other languages. The Mission Indians think he has powers of sorcery.

Ruiz-Kinikilali Berenda: This handsome young son of Esteban Berenda is a half-Spanish, half-esselen vaquero. He is skilled at riding horses and throwing the reata, or lariat. He is killed by a bear who may be a medicine man in disguise.

Saturnino: El mayordomo, "a combination of sacristan and Indian chief". He says he is a Rumsen Indian, but is most likely a runaway Esselen. He is in charge of the chapel and the nunnery (where the unmarried women stay). He is a reata-maker who weaves the lariat intended to snare the bear that eventually kills Ruiz.

Fray Bernardo: Superior of the Mission San Carlos Borromeo de Carmelo. He is proud "of the good order, of the prosperousness, of the apparent contentment of the Indians" in his Mission. He speaks Spanish and Rumsen.

Esselen Girl: Wife of Hualala and the first Esselen that Fray Luis converts. Luis and Ruiz appear to be in competition for this girl.

== Other characters ==
Pawi-maliay-hapa: "Many Arrows," cousin and best friend of Ruiz.

Esteban Berenda: "One of the leather-jacketed soldiers who had come with Captain Portola on his first voyage of discovery." He is a Spanish settler who lives down the coast. He married an Esselen woman and has one son, Ruiz.

Amomuths: The most powerful local "doctor" or medicine man. He is Ruiz's great-uncle on his mother's side. He is usually conducting ceremonies in the ceremonial house, where he tells ancient tales. Amomoths comforts Esteban Berenda after Ruiz dies. In the final scenes of Fray Luis's death, Amomuths is the mysterious figure seated before him in the ceremonial house: "Then it began again, the bear sitting there against the north wall, then Amomuths, then the bear . . ."

Hualala: He is an Indian medicine man and husband of the Esselen girl.

== Religious or supernatural content ==
Nature of the Native American folktale: Expressions of Native American spirituality in The Lariat: One of the most important aspects of Native American culture is that it springs from an oral tradition. Not only are the tales and moral precepts passed orally from one generation to the next, but the passing is multi-vocal in nature. Stories are told and retold, and are influenced by current events as well as by the speaker's interactions with his or her audience.

Native spiritual traditions live in song, story, and ceremony. They live in the experiences of those who bring them into being. They live in the dream-space intensity of personal vision and in the shared cosmic ordering of words and actions that people of knowledge perform in ceremony. Songs, stories, and ceremony have an internal consistency. They represent the way things are. They constitute a language of performance, participation, and experience. They represent the cosmic order within which the world realizes its meaning.

Because The Lariat is presented as a tale of white, Christian encroachment into and entanglement with the world of Native American spirituality, de Angulo, an anthropologist specializing in Native American culture, tells the story within the framework of that native tradition. The work is multivocal, told from multiple viewpoints, and retains the dialogic properties that are the basis of all Native American oral tradition. "In Native American cultures generally, conversational communicants include all sentient beings; animal persons, the voices of natural places and forces, and the voices of those who have gone before. Coyote may [be] there, too, making fun of it all".

Magic Realism in The Lariat: It seems that the power of sorcery that Fray Luis has is an element of magic realism. The description of the rope on page 93 seems a lot like the magic realism in Garcia Marquez's One Hundred Years of Solitude. The Lariat does have a postcolonial element: the two conflicting cultures are colonizer and colonized. I'm not sure what to call it in this story maybe religious perfection vs. humanness, or, a conflict between goodness and badness in the story. Seems that magical realism meshes the magical and the real at times. Magical Realism could explain the arrows bouncing off the bear in the story and other parts where the bear is in the story.

Suzanne Baker in her essay, "Binarisms and Duality: Magic Realism and Postcolonialism" talks about magic realism: ...the central concept of magic realism in literature is its insistence on the co-existence of the magic and the real. While a narrator of the fantastic dispenses with the laws of logic and the physical world and recounts an action which may be absurd or supernatural, a narrator of magic realism accepts most or all of the realistic conventions of fiction but introduces "something else," something which is not realistic, into the text. These elements are not highlighted for shock value, but are woven in seamlessly."

The point regarding presenting Magical Realism in a way that avoids shock value is an important one. Plodding readers, those who are mired in everyday "reality" will be shocked or skeptical of talking animals or mice traveling via moonbeam. The more accepting or open-minded reader should not be surprised at such events because, properly presented, the so-called magical elements are everyday events and parts of the natural order.
