= No Escape (1936 film) =

- British trade ad
- Directed by: Norman Lee
- Written by: George Goodchild and Frank Witty (play No Exit)
- Starring: Valerie Hobson; Leslie Perrins; Robert Cochran
- Cinematography: Bryan Langley
- Edited by: Lionel Tomlinson
- Production company: Welwyn Studios
- Distributed by: Pathé Pictures (UK)
- Release date: December 1936
- Running time: 80 minutes
- Country: United Kingdom
- Language: English

No Escape (also known as No Exit) is a 1936 British thriller film directed by Norman Lee and starring Valerie Hobson, Leslie Perrins and Robert Cochran. It was written by George Goodchild and Frank Witty from their play No Exit, and was made as a quota quickie. The screenplay concerns a man who attempts to hide his friend for a month.

== Plot summary ==
Detective story writer Anthony Wild makes a bet with his friend Billy West that he can hide him for a month. After staging a disappearance, Billy goes to Anthony's country cottage. Laura Anstey, with whom Anthony is in love but who is married to Cyril Anstey, is worried about Billy and visits Anthony at the cottage. Billy is shot during a night-time rabbit hunt, and the police find his body, suspecting Anthony is the murderer. The culprit, however, turns out to be Cyril, who killed Billy believing him to be Laura's lover. Cyril is killed as he tries to evade the police, leaving Anthony and Laura free to marry.

== Cast ==
- Valerie Hobson as Laura Anstey
- Leslie Perrins as Anthony Wild
- Robert Cochran as Beeston
- Henry Oscar as Cyril Anstey
- Billy Milton as Billy West
- Ronald Simpson as Scoop Martin
- Kenneth Law as Jenner
- Margaret Yarde as Bunty
- Hal Gordon as County Constable
- J. Neil More as Police Commissioner
- Hilda Campbell as Russell, barmaid

== Critical reception ==
The Monthly Film Bulletin wrote: "The story is neatly constructed, but the meticulous attention to details of the investigation by the police makes the film rather slow. The direction is effective and the climax is well achieved."

Kine Weekly wrote: "The direction lacks the slick efficiency of the Americans. However, the many phases are in themselves diverting, and by the time it ends it succeeds in combining romance and humour with the unexpected to the tune of crisp, all-round entertainment."

The Daily Film Renter wrote: "Main angles of appeal include realistic presentation of Scotland Yard detective, quota of comedy relief, and well staged car wreck at climax. Agreeable offering for the masses."

TV Guide gave the film 2/4 stars, writing: "the story is a little slow to start but once things are under way, this turns into an effective, though minor thriller. The acting and production credits are adequate."
