= Sylvia M. Broadbent =

American anthropologist

Sylvia Marguerite Broadbent
- Born: February 26, 1932; London, England
- Died: July 30, 2015 (aged 83); Arlington, California, United States
- Education: A.A University of California, Berkeley, 1950: A.B University of California, Berkeley, 1952; Ph.D University of California, Berkeley, 1960
- Title: Professor Emerita of Anthropology

Sylvia Marguerite Broadbent (London, United Kingdom, 26 February 1932 - Arlington, California, United States, 30 July 2015) was an American anthropologist and professor, specializing in Amerindian peoples.

== Early life ==
Broadbent was born in London. She emigrated with her family in the wake of World War II to Carmel, California, in 1947. Broadbent graduated from Carmel High School in 1948 at the age of 16. Broadbent enrolled at University of California, Berkeley, where she was awarded the Horatio Stebbins scholarship as a junior and earned her Associate of Arts degree in anthropology (with honors) in 1951. She went on to win a Genevieve McEnerny fellowship and receive her bachelor's degree in anthropology (with highest honors) in 1952. From 1955 to 1960 she performed research among native peoples in Southern California and recorded Chukchansi, Ohlone, and Miwok. Her 1960 doctoral dissertation was A grammar of Southern Sierra Miwok, written under the advisement of Mary Haas.

== Career ==
Broadbent began teaching at Northwestern University for Spring Semester 1961 followed by Barnard College that fall. She joined the faculty of Universidad de Los Andes in the Fall of 1964 to focus on the Muisca, native to the Altiplano Cundiboyacense, the high plateau of the Colombian Andes. She began teaching at University of California, Riverside (UCR) in 1966 and was promoted to full professor in 1972. She eventually retired as chair of the anthropology department. Her papers are archived with the special collections department at UCR. Broadbent, a member of the Sierra Club, was party to a lawsuit against the Bureau of Land Management to restrict the use of vehicles in the California desert. In 1981 she wrote The Formation of Peasant Society in Central Colombia, for which she was awarded the American Society for Ethnohistory's 1983 Robert F. Heizer prize. UCR offers a fellowship for anthropology graduate students in her name.

== Selected bibliography ==
- A Grammar of Southern Sierra Miwok (Ph.D). California Indian Library Collections. 1960.
- Los Chibchas: organizacion socio-politica (in Spanish). Bogota: Universidad Nacional de Colombia. 1964.
- (with Lucy Shepard Freeland) "Central Sierra Miwok Dictionary: With Texts". University of California Publications in Linguistics. Volume 23 of University of California publications in linguistics. University of California Press. 1960. ISSN 0068-6484.
- The Southern Sierra Miwok language. Volume 38 of University of California publications in linguistics. University of California Press. 1964.
- Investigaciones arqueológicas en el Territorio Chibcha (in Spanish). Colombia: Ediciones Universidad de los Andes. 1965.
- Broadbent, Sylvia M. (Summer 1981). "The Formation of Peasant Society in Central Colombia". Ethnohistory. 28 (3). Duke University Press: 259–277. doi:10.2307/481407. JSTOR 481407.
- "The Symbolism of the Sipapu". Psychological Perspectives. 13 (1). 1982 – via Pubget.
