= The Viaduct Murder =

1925 novel

- Author: Ronald Knox
- Language: English
- Genre: Detective
- Publisher: Methuen
- Publication date: 1925
- Publication place: United Kingdom
- Media type: Print

The Viaduct Murder is a 1925 mystery detective novel by the British author Ronald Knox. A stand-alone novel, it was a precursor to his series of five books featured the insurance investigator Miles Bredon, all published during the Golden Age of Detective Fiction. It was published in London by Methuen and in New York by Simon and Schuster.

== Synopsis ==
A body is discovered on the course of a residential golf club on the site of a former country house. It has clearly fallen off the nearby railway viaduct. Convinced that it has been thrown off a passing train, and that police are not taking the matter seriously following the coroner's inquest, several of the golfing residents led by Mordaunt Reeves investigate what they believing to be a case of murder. Reeves, who held a minor role in military intelligence during the First World War, takes on the role of detective and begins to form a variety of solutions to the case, most of which ultimately prove to be false.

== Bibliography ==
- Bargainnier, Earl F. Comic Crime. Popular Press, 1987.
- Barzun, Jacques & Taylor, Wendell Hertig. A Catalogue of Crime. Harper & Row, 1989.
- Corbishley, Thomas. Ronald Knox, the Priest. Sheed and Ward, 1965.
- Haycraft, Howard. Murder for Pleasure: The Life and Times of the Detective Story. Courier Dover Publications, 2019.
- Hubin, Allen J. Crime Fiction, 1749-1980: A Comprehensive Bibliography. Garland Publishing, 1984.
- Reilly, John M. Twentieth Century Crime & Mystery Writers. Springer, 2015.
- Rooney, David. The Wine of Certitude: A Literary Biography of Ronald Knox. Ignatius Press, 2014.
- Shaw, Bruce. Jolly Good Detecting: Humor in English Crime Fiction of the Golden Age. McFarland, 2013.
