= Chamber Music (poetry collection) =

1907 poetry collection by James Joyce

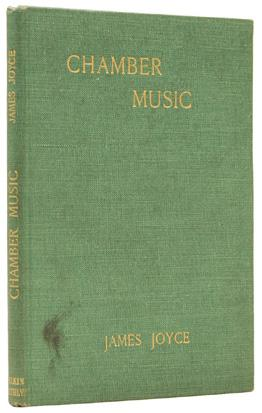
- First edition
- Author: James Joyce
- Genre: poetry
- Publisher: Elkin Mathews
- Publication date: 1907
- Publication place: Ireland
- Media type: Print (hardback & paperback)
- Pages: 48
- ISBN: 0-224-00606-1 (Jonathan Cape 1971 edition)
- OCLC: 29065809
- Followed by: Dubliners (1914)

Chamber Music is a collection of poems by James Joyce, published by Elkin Mathews in London in May 1907. The collection originally comprised thirty-four love poems, but two further poems were added before publication ("All day I hear the noise of waters" and "I hear an army charging upon the land").

== Summary ==
Although it is widely reported that the title refers to the sound of urine tinkling in a chamber pot, this is a later Joycean embellishment, lending an earthiness to a title first suggested by his brother Stanislaus and which Joyce (by the time of publication) had come to dislike: "The reason I dislike Chamber Music as a title is that it is too complacent", he admitted to Arthur Symons in 1906. "I should prefer a title which repudiated the book without altogether disparaging it."

Richard Ellmann reports (from a 1949 conversation with Eva Joyce, the author's sister) that the chamber-pot connotation has its origin in a visit he made, accompanied by Oliver Gogarty, to a young widow named Jenny in May 1904. The three of them drank porter while Joyce read manuscript versions of the poems aloud - and, at one point, Jenny retreated behind a screen to make use of a chamber pot. Gogarty commented, "There's a critic for you!". When Joyce later told this story to Stanislaus, his brother agreed that it was a "favourable omen".

In Ulysses, Leopold Bloom reflects, "Chamber music. Could make a pun on that."

In fact, the poetry of Chamber Music is not in the least bawdy, nor reminiscent of the sound of tinkling urine. Although the poems did not sell well (fewer than half of the original print run of 500 had been sold in the first year), they received some critical acclaim. Ezra Pound admired the "delicate temperament" of these early poems, while Yeats described "I hear an army charging upon the land" as "a technical and emotional masterpiece". In 1909, Joyce wrote to his wife, "When I wrote [Chamber Music], I was a lonely boy, walking about by myself at night and thinking that one day a girl would love me."

== Musical adaptations ==
In a February 1907 letter to his brother Stanislaus, prior to the publication of Chamber Music, Joyce wrote: "...[I]t is a young man's book. I felt like that. It is not a book of love-verses at all, I perceive. But some of them are pretty enough to be put to music. I hope someone will do so, someone that knows old English music such as I like. Besides they are not pretentious and have a certain grace."

Today, although the individual poems of Chamber Music are less frequently anthologised than the later Pomes Penyeach, they continue to have – as Joyce hoped – an accessible lyricism which has led to a wide-ranging number of musical adaptations, including pieces by Samuel Barber, Karol Szymanowski, Luciano Berio, Juliana Hall, Ernest Moeran, Dorothy Priesing, Ross Lee Finney, Aleksandar Simić, Ivan Božičević, Israel Citkowitz, Robin Williamson, Dr. Strangely Strange, Syd Barrett, Oswaldo Gonzalez, Martyn Bates of Eyeless in Gaza, and Jim O'Rourke and Steve Shelley of Sonic Youth. In France, Nicolas Grenier and Torphy composed an ambient song about the collection.

In 2008, Fire Records released a two-disc compilation featuring all thirty-six poems set to music by contemporary alternative acts, including Mercury Rev, Gravenhurst, Ed Harcourt, and Willy Mason.

On Bloomsday 2017, Node Records released Goldenhair, featuring twenty-one of the thirty-six Chamber Music poems set to music by Irish composer, arranger, producer, and pianist Brian Byrne, performed by Kurt Elling, Glenn Close, Julian Lennon, Judith Hill, Keith Harkin, Andrew Strong, Gavin Friday, Curtis Stigers, Kate McGarry, Sara Gazarek, Kristina Train, Jack Lukeman, Cara Dillon, Declan O'Rourke, Lisa Lambe, Cara O'Sullivan, Balsam Range, and the RTÉ Concert Orchestra. Byrne's music was originally a collection of chamber works composed over six years, which he then arranged for Goldenhair in a range of genres, including adult contemporary, jazz, big band, classical, bluegrass, and spoken word.

In 2017, French composer Camille Pépin set eighteen of Joyce's poems to music. The pieces were performed and recorded by chamber music group Ensemble Polygones and sung by Mezzo-soprano Fiona McGown and were included on the album Camille Pépin: Chamber Music which was released in 2019 by French classical record label NoMadMusic.

In 2024, the Choral Scholars of University College Dublin released James Joyce Chamber Music Vol. I. on Signum Records, featuring newly commissioned choral settings of eighteen poems from Chamber Music. Conducted by Desmond Earley and performed with the Solstice Ensemble, the recording featured contributions from composers from Ireland, Europe, North America, and Australia as part of a planned complete musical setting of all thirty-six poems in the collection.

Eugene Goossens set six of the poems for his song cycle Chamber Music completed in 1930. A recording was issued by Resonus Classics in 2026, performed by James Geer (tenor) and Ronald Woodley (piano).
