= George Goodchild =

British writer (1888–1969)

George Goodchild (1 December 1888 – 1969), also known as Alan Dare, Wallace Q. Reid, and Jesse Templeton, was a British author, screenwriter, and director. Over 200 Goodchild works were published during his lifetime and posthumously. His literary characters include Inspector McLean, spy catcher Q33 Trelawney, Nigel Rix, and Trooper O'Neill. Goodchild's films include Colorado Jack (1921), Bucking the Barrier (1923), The Public Defender (1931), Condemned to Death (1932), Trooper O'Neill (1932), and No Escape (1936).

== Personal life ==
Goodchild was born in Kingston upon Thames in 1888. Goodchild married Dora Mary Hill and had one son and two daughters while living at The Great Quarry, Guildford. Before full-time writing, he worked in journalism and publishing. He died at Aldershot in 1969, aged 80.

== Oeuvre: all works ==
Goodchild's complete works include novels, plays, novelizations, short stories, non-fiction, anthologies, collections, films, editing, and a 1921 Children's News science fiction submission. McLean stories appeared anonymously in The Weekly News until 6 October 1979, ten years after Goodchild's death.*18

== Books ==
=== Series (includes collections) ===
Inspector McLean 66

1. McLean of Scotland Yard (Hodder & Stoughton London 1929)
2. McLean at the Golden Owl (Hodder 1930)
3. McLean Investigates (Hodder 1930)
4. How Now, McLean? (Hodder 1931)
5. Chief Inspector McLean (Hodder 1932)
6. 12 Dandy McLean Detective Stories (D.C. Thomson London 1933)
7. 12 Famous McLean Cases (Thomson 1933)
8. Dandy Against the Gangsters (Thomson Library 5? 1933)
9. Dandy Hangs Behind (Thomson 1933)
10. Dandy Nabs the Falcon (Thomson 1933)
11. Greta Dey's Confession (Thomson 1933)
12. Her Little Game (Thomson 1933)
13. The Pretty Daredevil (Thomson 1933)
14. The Prince of Crooks (Thomson 1933)
15. The Terror of Stapleton Quarry (Thomson 1933)
16. The Triumph of McLean (1933)
17. McLean Plays a Hand (Ward Lock London Melbourne 1934)
18. Yes, Inspector McLean (Hodder & Stoughton London 1934, Chivers NA 1995)
19. Death on the Centre Court (Hodder 1935, Green Circle NY 1936)
20. McLean Knows Best (Ward 1935)
21. McLean Prevails (Ward 1935)
22. Lead On, McLean! (Hodder 1936)
23. McLean Finds a Way (Hodder 1936)
24. McLean Remembers (Hodder 1936)
25. Call McLean (Hodder 1937)
26. McLean Takes Charge (Hodder 1937)
27. Danger Below (Hodder 1937)
28. Having No Hearts (Hodder 1937}
29. McLean Incomparable (Hodder 1938)
30. Again McLean (Hodder 1939)
31. McLean Excels (Hodder 1939)
32. McLean Intervenes (1939)
33. McLean Sees It Through (1939)
34. McLean Deduces (Hodder 1940)
35. Up, McLean! (Hodder 1940)
36. McLean Keeps Going (Hodder 1941)
37. McLean Non-Stop (1941)
38. McLean Takes a Holiday (Hodder 1942)
39. revised Inspector McLean's Holiday (Pan London 1951)
40. Uncle Oscar's Niece (Hodder 1944)
41. Hail McLean (Hodder 1945)
42. Inspector McLean's Casebook (Rich & Cowan London 1950, White Lion 1972)
43. The Efford Tangle (Rich 1950, Ulverscroft 1995)
44. McLean Carries on (Rich 1950)
45. McLean Predominant (Rich 1951)
46. McLean to the Dark Tower Came (Rich 1951, Ulverscroft 1998)
47. The Last Redoubt (Rich 1952)
48. McLean Steps in (Rich 1952)
49. Well caught, McLean (Rich 1953)
50. Double Acrostic (Rich 1954)
51. Trust McLean (Rich 1954)
52. Find the Lady (Rich 1955)
53. Watch McLean (Rich 1955)
54. The Last Secret (Rich 1956)
55. McLean Solves it (1956)
56. Forever McLean (1957)
57. Next of Kin (Jarrolds 1957, Harlequin Toronto 1957)
58. McLean Disposes (Jarrolds 1958)
59. McLean Scores Again (Jarrolds 1959, Ulverscroft UK 2004)
60. Follow McLean (Jarrolds 1961)
61. McLean Invincible (Jarrolds 1963)
62. Laurels for McLean (Jarrolds 1964)
63. McLean Takes Over (John Long London 1967)
64. McLean Knows the Answers (Long 1967, Dales London 2003)

Trelawney and other series

1. The Man from the West (George Newnes London 1935)
2. (Mister) Q 33 (Trelawney) (Newnes 1935, Odhams London 1935)
3. This Woman is Wanted (Newnes 1935)
4. Danger Below (Hodder 1937)
5. Having No Hearts (Hodder 1937)
6. Q-33 Spy Catcher (T) (Newnes 1937)
7. Dear Conspirator (M?)(Ward Lock London Melbourne 1948)
8. Companion to Sirius (M?)(Rich & Cowan London 1949)
9. Tiger, Tiger (M?) (Jarrolds 1959)
10. Savage Encounter (M?) (Jarrolds 1962)

Novelized from plays

1. The Barton Mystery, from Walter Hackett play (Jarrolds London 1916)
2. Tiger's Cub, Alaskan romance from George Potter (Jarrolds 1917)

Novels

1. The Last Cruise of the Majestic (1917)
2. Behind the Barrage, A Siege Battery (Jarrolds 1918)
3. The Land of Eldorado, Seal Islands (Jarrolds 1919)
4. Old Sport, Warhorse Romance, with Maurice Mottram (Jarrolds 1919)
5. Colorado Jim or The Taming of Angela (Robert Hayes London 1920, Watt NY 1922)
6. The Woollen Monkey (Lloyds London 1920)
7. The Compassionate Rogue (1920)
8. The Alaskan (Lloyds 1921)
9. A Message from Space (1921)
10. Trooper O'Neill (Hayes 1921)
11. Killigrew (as Alan Dare, Herbert Jenkins London 1922) repub Knight Takes Queen (George Newnes London 1935)
12. Klondyke Kit's Revenge (Jenkins 1923)
13. The Valley of Lies (Long London 1923)
14. The Isle Of Hate, as Dare (Jenkins 1924) (repub Newnes 1934)
15. The Valley of Lies (Long London 1923)
16. Jake Canuke (as Jesse Templeton, Hurst & Blackett London 1924) GG (Hodder 1932) aka The Call of the North (George Newnes London 1938)
17. Plain Bill, Alaskan romance (Jarrolds London 1924)
18. Tall Timber (Watt NY 1924, Hodder Stoughton London 1927)
19. The Man Who Wasn't (Jenkins 1923-4)
20. Hurricane Tex (Hodder 1925)
21. Out Of The Desert (as Dare 1925)
22. The Eternal Conflict (as Templeton, Hurst 1925), GG (Archer GB 1950)
23. The Feud (Hurst 1925) GG (Hodder 1935)
24. The Taming of Nancy (Red Letter 141 DC Thomson London 1925)
25. The Black Orchid (Hodder 1926)
26. Jim Goes North (Jim) (Hodder 1926)
27. Ace High (Hodder 1927)
28. The Eye of Abu (as Dare, Jenkins 1927) repub Newnes 1934
29. The Timber Wolf (as Templeton, Hurst 1927)
30. Meg o'the Dale (Red Letter 179 DC Thomson London 1927)
31. Mushalong (Hayes London 1927)
32. The Monster of Grammont (Hodder 1927, Mystery League NY 1930)
33. His Desert Maid (J Leng - Ivy 133 London 1928)
34. The Rain on the Roof (1928)
35. The Guarded Soul (as Dare, Jenkins 1928) aka Body and Soul (Jarrolds 1929)
36. Sands of Desire (as Wallace Q. Reid, Robert Hayes London 1928) W. Collins London 1933
37. The Freeze-Out (Hodder 1929)
38. Jack O'Lantern (Hodder 1929, Mystery League NY 1930)
39. Body and Soul (1929) (as Alan Dare)
40. The Elephant or The Man from Beyond (Hodder London 1929)
41. Between the Tides (as Templeton, Ward 1929) GG (Ward Lock London Melbourne 1937); abridged (Ward 1938)
42. The Bitter Test (as Templeton, Ward 1930)
43. Clay-Face (as Templeton, Ward 1930)
44. The Emperor of Hallelujah Island (Hodder London 1930, Houghton NY 1931)
45. The Splendid Crime (Hodder London 1930) as The Public Defender (Grosset NY 1931)
46. The Girl at Pine Creek (Thomson Red 242 1930)
47. The Girl who Failed Him (Thomson Red 259 London 1930)
48. His Bride from England (Thomson Red 203 1930)
49. Her Dear Tyrant (Leng Ivy 214 1931)
50. Ten Fathoms Deep (as Templeton, Ward 1931) GG (Ward 1938)
51. The Yellow Hibiscus (as Templeton, Ward 1931)
52. The Road to Marrakesh (Hodder 1931, Houghton NY 1932)
53. For Reasons Unknown (Hodder 1932)
54. Love's Challenge (as Templeton, Mellifont London 1932)
55. Petticoat Lane (Mellifont 1932)
56. Flagons of St. Niven (Mellifont 1932)
57. The Choice (Mellifont 1932)
58. Rosemary's Love Adventure (Mellifont 1932)
59. The House of Strange Adventure (Mellifont 1932)
60. The Singing Wheat (Mellifont 1932)
61. The Skeleton in the Cupboard (Mellifont 1932)
62. Winning Through (as Templeton, Ward 1932) GG (Ward 1935)
63. Bride of the Sierras (as Reid, Collins 1933)
64. Man from Peace River (Collins 1933)
65. Captain Sinister (Hodder London 1933)
66. Mountain Gold (Hodder 1933)
67. Rainbow: the story of a dog and a man (Chapman & Hall London 1933)
68. The Jury Disagree, (with C. E. Bechhofer Roberts, Jarrolds London 1934, MacMillan NY 1955)
69. Saskatoon Patrol (as Reid, Collins 1934)
70. Virginia's Quest (as Templeton, Mellifont 1934)
71. The Woman Accused (Mellifont 1934)
72. Mad Mike (Chapman Hall London 1934, Harlequin Toronto 1953)
73. Quest of Nigel Rix (Ward 1934)
74. Red River (as Reid, Collins 1934)
75. Dear Old Gentleman, with Roberts (Jarrolds 1935, Harper NY 1936)
76. Bluewater Landing (as Reid, Collins 1935)
77. The Homeward Trail (George Newnes London 1935)
78. Knight Takes Queen (1935)
79. Knock and Come In (Rix#?) (Ward 1935)
80. Son Of The South (as Reid, Collins 1935)Steve (1936)
81. Tidings of Joy, with Roberts (Jarrolds 1936)
82. Doctor Of The North (as Reid Collins 1936)
83. No Exit (Newnes London 1936)
84. The Rainbow Trail (as Reid, Collins 1936)
85. Rough Going (Ward 1936)
86. Summer Moon (Leng - The People's Friend #429 1936)
87. Operator No. 19 (Ward 1937)
88. A Murder Will Be Committed (Robert Hale London 1937)
89. Yellowstones (Ward 1938)
90. Infamous Gentleman (Hale 1938)
91. The Prisoner's Friend, with Roberts (Jarrolds 1938)
92. The Square Deal (1939)
93. The Clock Struck Seven (1939)
94. We Shot an Arrow, with Roberts (Victor Gollancz London 1939)
95. Forced Landing (Hodder 1940)
96. Known as Z.1 (Ward 1940)
97. Man Peter (Ward 1941)
98. Brave Interlude (Ward 1942)
99. Behind That Door (Ward 1943, F.A. Thorpe GB 2005)
100. Safety Last (Ward 1944)
101. The Last Ditch (Mellifont 1944)
102. The Footlight's Call (Mellifont 1945)
103. Wise Virgin (Mellifont 1945)
104. Lady Take Care (Ward 1946)
105. Cauldron Bubble (Macdonald London 1946)
106. East of Singapore (Mellifont 1946)
107. Rivers to Cross (Ward 1947)
108. Stout Cortez (Ward 1949)
109. Final Score (Ward 1950)
110. The Spanish Steps (Ward 1951)
111. Doctor Zil's Experiment (Ward 1953)
112. The Last Secret (Rich & Cowan London 1956)
113. The Danger Line (Jarrolds 1958)
114. False Intruder, Old Yukon (Jarrolds 1960)

Collections asst'd

1. Caravan Days, illus. C.A. Shepperson (Jarrolds 1916)
2. Umpteen Yarns from France (Jarrolds 1917)
3. Down Plug Street Way (Simpkin Marshall London 1918)
4. The Crimson Domino (Simpkin 1919) abrid (as Templeton, Mellifont 1933)
5. The Great Alone (Simpkin 1919)
6. Captain Crash (Hayes 1924)
7. Inch of the CID (as Templeton, Ward 1936) GG (Ward 1936)
8. Mountain Gold (1933)
9. Q33 (1933)
10. Mister Q33 (1935)
11. The Man from the West (1935)
12. This Woman Is Wanted (1936)
13. Q33-Spy Catcher (1937)

Anthologies containing stories by George Goodchild

1. Fifty Famous Detectives of Fiction (1983)

Short stories

1. Death in the Dance
2. The Siamese Cat

Non-fiction

1. The Last Cruise of the Majestic from the log-book of J.G. Cowie (Simpkin 1917)
2. Pinches of Salt from the Seven Seas (Jarrolds, 1918)

Plays

1. They All Do It and two other plays with Roberts (Jerrolds 1935)

Others, Edited by GG

1. The Lore of the Wanderer, an open-air anthology (The Wayfarer's Library London 1914)
2. England, My England, a war anthology (Jarrolds 1914)
3. The Miniature Classics (Jarrolds 1914)
4. The Blinded Soldiers' and Sailors' Gift Book (Jarrolds 1915)
5. Made in the Trenches, articles and sketches from soldiers, Ed. by GG & Sir Frederick
6. Treves (G. Allen & Unwin London 1916)
7. A Century of Western Stories (Hutchison London 1936)

== Films ==
He wrote and directed films based on books and stories.

- Colorado Jack (1921) from Colorado Jim
- Bucking the Barrier (1923)
- The Public Defender (1931) from The Splendid Crime
- Condemned to Death (1932) from Jack o'Lantern
- Trooper O'Neill (1932)
- No Escape (1936) from No Exit

== Awards ==
Several awards were named after him.

1. George Goodchild Memorial Trophy 2010
