= Jaime de Angulo =

American poet

- Born: 1887; Paris, France
- Died: 1950 (aged 62–63)
- Occupations: Linguist and novelist
- Spouse: Lucy Shepard Freeland (m. 1923–1943)
- Writing career
- Subject: Native Californian Tribes

Jaime de Angulo (1887–1950) was a linguist, novelist, and ethnomusicologist in the western United States. He was born in Paris of Spanish parents. He came to America in 1905 to become a cowboy, and eventually arrived in San Francisco on the eve of the great 1906 earthquake. He lived a picaresque life including stints as a cowboy, medical doctor and psychologist, a decade of field work in Native American linguistics and anthropology, and over forty years participation in the literary-artistic-bohemian culture of the San Francisco Bay Area.

== Career ==
De Angulo began his career in field linguistics and anthropology at the University of California, Berkeley in the early 1920s, shortly after his marriage to L. S. ("Nancy") Freeland. (He had already acquired an M.D. from Johns Hopkins and done research in biology at Stanford.) During the next decade he and his wife lived for intermittent periods among several native Californian tribes to study their cultures, languages and music. As a linguist, he contributed to the knowledge of more than a dozen native Northern Californian and Mexican Indian languages and music-systems and collected additional field data about their cultures and oral traditions. De Angulo was particularly interested in the semantics of grammatical systems of the tribes he studied, and was a pioneer in the study of North American ethnomusicology, particularly in his recordings of native music. He was especially concerned to develop an existential understanding of Native American cosmology, social psychology, values and culture. From the perspective of the academic scholarship of the period, this amounted to "going native." His key exposition of this matter is “Indians In Overalls”, first published in 1950 in The Hudson Review and subsequently as a book.

De Angulo corresponded with Franz Boas, Alfred L. Kroeber, and Edward Sapir. Much of his fieldwork was funded by the American Council of Learned Societies Committee on Research in Native American Languages, under the direction chiefly of Boas, and in part by Kroeber, head of Berkeley's Department of Anthropology, which published and has archived some of his field notes.

As a phonetician, he was largely self-taught. He had no formal training in the field, but acquired some basics of the discipline and discourse from trained linguists he worked with, including Nancy Freeland; by his own account, his correspondence seeking instruction "exhausted Sapir's patience". In one case, the accuracy of his record has been questioned, and some linguistic work attributed to him was done by his wife. Boas, Kroeber, and finally Sapir also had qualms about his reliability, and Boas suspected that some of his analysis of Achumawi was imaginary and not based on actual observation, but these leaders in the still-emergent field of Americanist linguistics had an urgent need to get workers of any competence into the field while indigenous languages were still spoken.

De Angulo's Bohemian lifestyle ran afoul of college manners and social hypocrisies and contributed to his not pursuing a normal academic career. His involvement in Native American research effectively came to an end following the death of his son Alvar in an automobile accident in 1933, near Big Sur. He retired to an isolated hilltop ranch where he had lived intermittently for many years, and which he had first homesteaded after the 1915 failure of his ranch in Alturas. At this point, his writings took a turn into fiction and poetry, much of which he described as an alternative technique for presenting the ethnographic material he had collected in an accessible format. This was especially true for his bestseller, Indian Tales. Much of his fictional work attempted to recognize and embrace the native "coyote tales", or the trickster wisdom inherent in native storytelling. Ezra Pound called him "the American Ovid" and William Carlos Williams "one of the most outstanding writers I have ever encountered." De Angulo also went on to tutor numerous famous authors, including Jack Spicer in linguistics, and Robert Duncan in North American shamanic sorcery; he appears as a character in Jack Kerouac's books.

Perceptions of de Angulo swing wildly; he is seen variously as a gifted but inconsistent field ethnographer, an ‘‘Old Coyote,’’ and an anarchist hero and talented subversive. Some (including Pound and Williams) regarded him as an accomplished poet. De Angulo shaped and diversified the scholarly picture of the native Californian landscape. His re-envisioning of the ontological status of Native American cosmology and ethnology anticipated the Deep Ecology and Back To The Pleistocene thought of the 1990s. He was friend and colleague to poets, composers, and scholars such as Harry Partch, Henry Miller, Robinson Jeffers, Mary Austin, Henry Cowell, Carl Jung, D. H. Lawrence, Kenneth Rexroth, Robert Duncan, and many others and an important participant in the San Francisco Bay Area's literary and cultural avant garde from his arrival until his death.

== Works ==
- Coyote Man and Old Doctor Loon (San Francisco, Turtle Island, 1973)
- Coyote's Bones (San Francisco, Turtle Island, 1974)
- Indians in Overalls (Hudson Review, 1950; San Francisco, Turtle Island, 1973)', "his first linguistic field trip - in 1921 - to the Achumawi tribe"
- Indian Tales, A.A. Wyn and Hill & Wang (1953)
  - Indian Tales were read live on KPFA radio in the 1949 (prior to book publication), and released as a recording
- "Home Among The Swinging Stars: Collected Poems," ed. Stefan Hyner (Albuquerque, La Alameda Press, 2006)
- The Lariat (San Francisco, Turtle Island, 1974)
- "Don Bartolomeo" (San Francisco, Turtle Island, 1974)
- Old Time Stories, Volume 1: Shabegok. Turtle Island, 1976
- Old Time Stories, Volume 2: How The World Was Made. Turtle Island, 1976
