= Nicolas Grenier (artist) =

Canadian artist and painter (born 1982)

- Born: Nicolas Grenier; 1982 (age 43–44); Montreal, Canada
- Education: California Institute of the Arts
- Known for: Contemporary artist
- Awards: Prix Pierre-Ayot & The Sobey Art Award

Nicolas Grenier (born 1982) is a Canadian artist and painter. His paintings, sound recordings, and installations focus heavily on how certain principles in society converge and interact. His goal is to reveal how the individual interacts with the collective body and how the architecture we find ourselves in defines our subconscious and our interactions with each other. The foundation of his work is painting but in recent years he has expanded his practice to encompass a variety of mediums and think tank initiatives. His interest lies in the distorted connections of political, economic, cultural and social principles and how moneyless economies, radical inclusivity, giving up individualism, and other ideas could evoke a paradigm shift in values and beliefs.

== Biography ==
He was born in Montreal Canada in 1982. He holds a BFA from Concordia University (2004) and a MFA from the California Institute of the Arts (2010). He has attended several residency programs including the Skowhegan School of Painting and Sculpture (2016), the Saas-Fee Summer institute of Art in Berlin (2018) and the Banff Center.

== Career ==
He lives and works in Montreal, Canada and Los Angeles, California. A part of both the Canadian art community and the art community in California, Grenier has observed the inner workings of two diverse communities. Each local has offered him a diverse culture to observe and a plethora of growth-based and profit-oriented economical hierarchies. His work aims to reveal the major connections between the systems that shape our cultural and economical interactions with each other. Recent exhibitions include Vertically Integrated Socialism (Brugge Triennale 2015, Belgium), Promised Land Template (Biennale de Montréal, Musée d’art contemporain de Montréal, and Commonwealth and Council, Los Angeles), One Day Mismatched Anthems Will Be Shouted In Tune (Luis De Jesus, Los Angeles), The Work of The Work (University of California, Santa Barbara), Building on Ruins (Cirrus Gallery, Los Angeles) and Marginal Revolutions (KUAD Gallery, Istanbul).

== Awards ==
Grenier won the Prix Pierre-Ayot from the City of Montreal in 2016 and was a finalist for the Sobey Art Award in 2019.

== Collections ==
- The Progressive Art Collection (USA)
- Musée d’art contemporain de Montréal (Canada)
- Royal Bank of Canada (Canada)
- Collection du Musée national des beaux-arts du Québec (CPOA)
- Direction des services financiers de l’Université Concordia (Canada)
- Claridge inc. (Canada)
- Hotel Queen Elizabeth (Canada)
- National Bank of Canada (Canada)
- Caisse de dépôt et placement du Québec (Canada)
- City of Montreal (Canada)
- City of Longueuil (Canada)
- Groupe Apollo (Canada)
- Facebook (mural commission)(USA)
