= Cinque variazioni (Berio) =

Cinque variazioni'
- by Luciano Berio
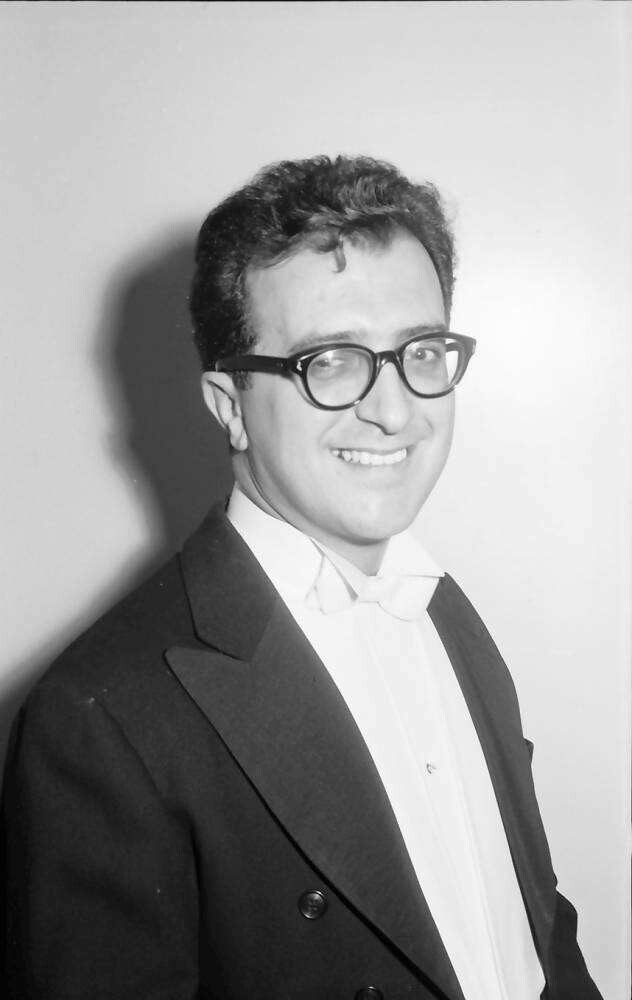
- Berio in Darmstadt, in 1959
- Composed: 1952, rev. 1966
- Dedication: Luigi Dallapiccola
- Performed: 1953
- Scoring: piano

Cinque variazioni ("Five variations") is a composition for solo piano by Luciano Berio, written in 1952–53 and greatly revised in 1966. It was published by Suvini Zerboni and the first performance was given by Berio in Milan in 1953.

== Variations ==
The variations are based on a three-note melodic cell—"fratello"[014]—from the opera Il prigioniero by Luigi Dallapiccola, to whom the work is dedicated (Berio, Dalmonte & Varga 1985, p. 53). Major changes between the two versions are indicated below, but many other small changes may be found, mostly additions to render the harmony more complex.

- First variation: calmo e flessibile. No theme is stated in this piece. Like Webern's piano Variations a twelve-tone row stated at the beginning stands in for a theme. The first variation remains largely within the ppp–pppp range. It begins with a series of major ninths (the number nine plays a significant role in the structure of the piece) and gradually gains in rhythmic and harmonic complexity.
- Second variation: poco meno del precedente. Mostly built on a sharp dotted motif but rapidly gains in speed and density, building up to a fff climax.
- Third variation: prestissimo (e ben articulato). Fragments of motifs thrown around with rests and accents. A short cadenza (. = 104) intervenes (the designation "cadenza" is taken out in the revised version). Finally, a coda prestissimo, rapidly building up from very soft to extremely loud, closes this variation (the word "coda" is removed in the revised version).
- Fourth variation: legatissimo e volante. Beginning pppp, with rapid, highly chromatic scale passages (sometimes divided between the hands) and fragments of motifs tossed around. Builds to several climaxes. The bottom score of page 13 and the first two scores of page 14 are new to the revised version.
- Fifth variation: calmo. Return to the pensive mood of the first variation, but with an intensely lyrical melody set among a large number of ornaments. The original version of the piece lacks almost all of these ornaments and is rhythmically far more simple and static (all the nonuplets are only found in the revised version).
- Coda: Return to the stationary, ninth-dominated motives of the start, mostly in the ppp range with much pedal.
