= Florence Carpenter Dieudonné =

American novelist

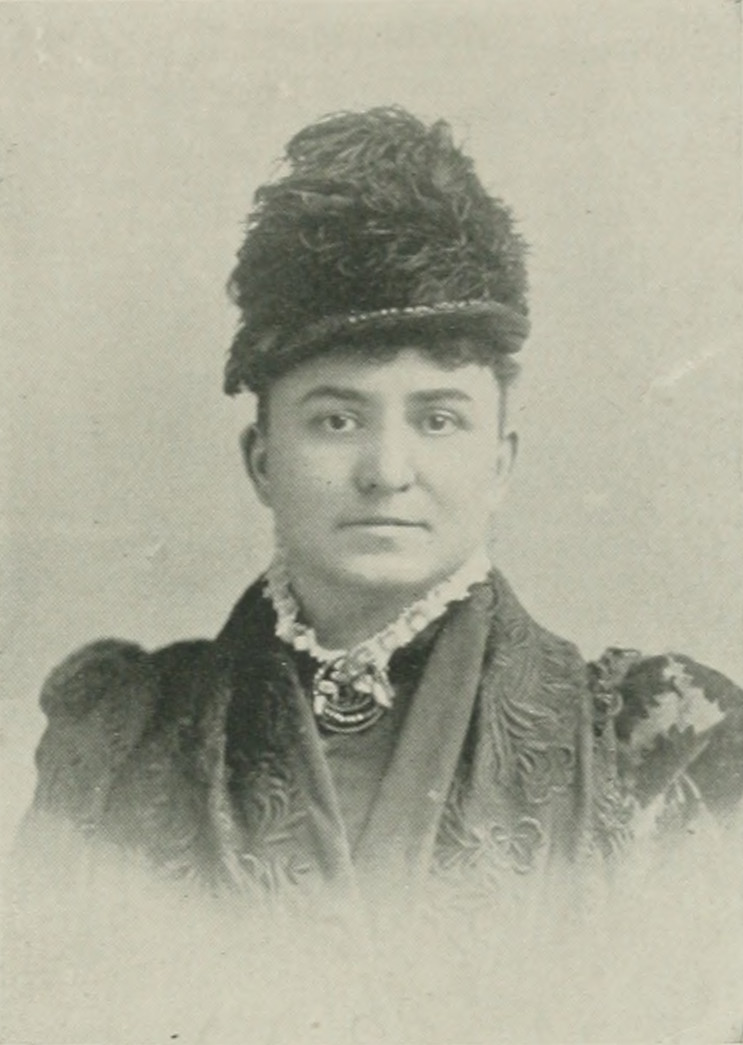
- from "Women on the Century"
- Born: Florence Lucinda Carpenter; Munnsville, New York
- Died: San Francisco
- Occupation: Writer
- Writing career
- Genre: Speculative fiction

Florence Carpenter Dieudonné (September 25, 1850 – April 17, 1927) was an early speculative fiction writer, active in America in the late 1800s.

== Biography ==
Florence Lucinda Carpenter was born in 1850 in Munnsville, New York, and raised in Oshkosh, Wisconsin.

Her first writings were poems published in a local newspaper and in Peterson's Magazine. After her marriage to a man surnamed Dieudonné, she traveled in Europe; letters that she sent back for publication in various newspapers enhanced her a reputation as writer. Dieudonné's first book was the long poem entitled A Pre-Historic Romanza (1882). She also wrote several cantatas with music by J. B. Carpenter.

Dieudonné is best known for two novels of speculative fiction: Rondah, or Thirty-Three Years in a Star (1887) and Xartella (1891). Rondah in particular is notable for prefiguring 20th century science fiction in its descriptions of another planet, and it was well ahead of its time in its sympathetic portrayal of extraterrestrial life. Rondah is about four people who are ported to a new planet still in the process of formation that is inhabited by bird people. It was inspired in part by theories about a possible disintegrated planet between Mars and Jupiter.

Xartella is more in line with late Victorian supernatural fantasy and exotic-location adventure novels by such writers as H. Rider Haggard. Set in Egypt, it is centered on a triangle of characters: an immortal Egyptian of that name who is able to reanimate mummies, an old man, and the woman they both love, Artossa. The story is narrated by a later explorer who encounters the old man and becomes involved in events when he accidentally reanimates Xartella's wife Aphiah.

Dieudonné lived in Washington, D.C., where she was president of the Parzelia Circle, a literary club. She died in 1927 in California.

== Works ==
- A Pre-Historic Romanza (Minneapolis, Minn.: The Falls Printing Co., 1882)
- Rondah, or Thirty-Three Years in a Star (Philadelphia, Penna.: T. B. Peterson and Brothers, 1887)
- Zardec (1885)
- Xartella (Washington, D.C.: Press of Gedney and Roberts, 1891)
