= Terror Keep =

1927 novel by Edgar Wallace

- First edition (US)
- Author: Edgar Wallace
- Language: English
- Genre: Thriller
- Publisher: Hodder & Stoughton (UK); Doubleday, Page and Co. (US)
- Publication date: 1927
- Publication place: United Kingdom
- Media type: Print

Terror Keep is a 1927 thriller novel by the British writer Edgar Wallace. It is part of a series featuring Wallace's detective J.G. Reeder.

== Bibliography ==
- Russell, James. Great British Fictional Detectives. Remember When, 2009.
