= Ronald Knox =

English Catholic priest and author (1888–1957)

The Right Reverend Monsignor Ronald Knox
- Knox, c. 1928
- Previous post: Anglican priest in the Church of England (1912–1917)

Orders
- Ordination: 1918

Personal details
- Born: 17 February 1888 Kibworth, Leicestershire, England
- Died: 24 August 1957 (aged 69) Mells, Somerset, England
- Buried: Church of St Andrew, Mells; 51.241928°N 2.390525°W
- Denomination: Catholic Church
- Parents: Edmund Knox (father)

Ronald Arbuthnott Knox (17 February 1888 – 24 August 1957) was an English Catholic priest, theologian, author, and radio broadcaster. Educated at Eton and Balliol College, Oxford, where he earned a high reputation as a classicist, Knox was ordained as a priest of the Church of England in 1912. He was a fellow and chaplain of Trinity College, Oxford until he resigned from those positions following his conversion to Catholicism in 1917. Knox became a Catholic priest in 1918, continuing in that capacity his scholarly and literary work.

Knox served as Catholic chaplain at the University of Oxford from 1926 to 1939. He completed the "Knox Bible", a new English translation of the Latin Vulgate Bible that was used in Catholic services during the 1960s and 1970s. In 1951, Pope Pius XII appointed Knox protonotary apostolic ad instar, which entitled Knox to the honorific "monsignor".

Knox published extensively on religious, philosophical, and literary subjects. He also produced several popular works of detective fiction, such as The Viaduct Murder (1925) and The Three Taps (1927). He is remembered for his "Ten Commandments" for detective stories, which sought to codify a form of crime fiction in which the reader may participate by attempting to find a solution to the mystery before the fictional detective reveals it.

== Early life and education ==
Ronald Knox was born into an Anglican family in Kibworth, Leicestershire. His father was the Rev. Edmund Arbuthnott Knox, who later became Bishop of Manchester in the Church of England and who was related to the 8th Viscount of Arbuthnott. Ronald's maternal grandfather was Valpy French, the first Anglican Bishop of Lahore in what was then part of the British Raj. Both Edmund Knox and Valpy French were prominent Evangelical Anglicans.

Ronald was educated at Eaton House School in London and Summer Fields School in Oxford. In 1900 he entered Eton College as first King's Scholar. He enjoyed great academic and social success at Eton, where he was selected for membership in the Eton Society ("Pop") and became captain of the school. He also began to cultivate an interest in Anglo-Catholicism, which put him increasingly at odds with his own family's Evangelical tradition. At age 17, he privately vowed to remain celibate for life.

In 1904 Ronald proceeded to Balliol College, Oxford as the first classics scholar. He won several other scholarships and prizes during his time there: the Hertford Scholarship in 1907; the Craven and Ireland scholarships, the Gaisford Prize for Greek Verse Composition in 1908, and the Chancellor's Prize for Latin Verse Composition in 1910. At Oxford, Knox joined Maurice Child's fashionable "set", which was strongly identified with Anglo-Catholicism.

In 1910, Knox was elected a fellow of Trinity College, Oxford. As he was not expected to begin tutorials until 1911, Knox then accepted the job of private tutor to Harold Macmillan, the brother of a friend from Eton, who was at the time preparing to apply for a scholarship to Balliol. However, Macmillan's mother soon dismissed Knox, after Knox refused to follow her instructions not to discuss religion with Harold.

== Church of England ==
Knox was ordained an Anglican priest in 1912 and was appointed chaplain of Trinity College. During World War I, he served in military intelligence for the British Armed Forces. In 1915, Cyril Alington, the headmaster of Shrewsbury School, invited Knox to join the teaching staff. Knox was long remembered at Shrewsbury as the highly dedicated and entertaining form master of Vb.

== Conversion and ministry ==
In 1917 Knox converted to Catholicism and resigned as Anglican chaplain, prompting his father to cut Knox out of his will. In 1918, Knox was ordained a Catholic priest and in 1919 joined the staff of St Edmund's College in Ware, Hertfordshire, remaining there until 1926. Knox explained his spiritual journey in A Spiritual Aeneid, published by Longmans in 1918. Knox stated that his conversion was influenced in part by G. K. Chesterton, who was a High Church Anglican at the time, but not yet a Catholic. In 1922, Chesterton converted to Catholicism and said that Knox had influenced his decision.

Knox wrote and broadcast on Christianity and other subjects. While chaplain at the University of Oxford (1926–1939) and after his elevation to a monsignor in 1936, he wrote classic detective stories. In 1929 Knox codified the rules for detective stories into a "decalogue" of ten commandments. He was one of the founding members of the Detection Club and wrote several works of detective fiction, including five novels and a short story featuring Miles Bredon, who is employed as a private investigator by the Indescribable Insurance Company.

In 1936, directed by his religious superiors, Knox started retranslating the Latin Vulgate Bible into English using Hebrew and Greek sources. His works on religious themes include: Some Loose Stones (1913), Reunion All Round (1914), A Spiritual Aeneid (1918), The Belief of Catholics (1927), Caliban in Grub Street (1930), Heaven and Charing Cross (1935), Let Dons Delight (1939) and Captive Flames (1940). When G. K. Chesterton died in 1936, Knox delivered a panegyric for his Requiem Mass in Westminster Cathedral.

An essay in Knox's Essays in Satire (1928), "Studies in the Literature of Sherlock Holmes", was the first of the genre of mock-serious critical writings on Sherlock Holmes and mock-historical studies in which the existence of Holmes, Watson, et al. is assumed. Another of these essays, "The Authorship of In Memoriam", purports to prove that Tennyson's poem was actually written by Queen Victoria. Another satirical essay, "Reunion All Round", mocked Anglican tolerance by appealing to the Anglican Church in Swiftean literary style to absorb Muslims, atheists, and even Catholics who had murdered Irish children.

In 1954 Knox visited Julian Asquith and Anne Asquith in Zanzibar and John and Daphne Acton in Rhodesia. While in Africa, Knox began his translation of The Imitation of Christ. After returning to Mells in England, he started translating Thérèse of Lisieux's Autobiography of a Saint. He also began a work of apologetics intended to reach a wider audience than the student one of his The Belief of Catholics (1927). In 1957, Knox suffered a serious illness that curtailed all his work. At the invitation of Harold Macmillan, Knox stayed at 10 Downing Street while consulting a medical specialist in London. The doctor confirmed that Knox had terminal cancer.

Knox died on 24 August 1957, and his body was brought to Westminster Cathedral. Bishop George L. Craven celebrated the requiem Mass and Fr Martin D'Arcy preached the panegyric. Knox was buried in the churchyard of St Andrew's Church, Mells.

== Radio hoax ==
In January 1926, on BBC Radio, Knox presented Broadcasting the Barricades, a simulated live report of revolution in London. The broadcast reported the lynching of several people, including a government minister. It also mixed what it called band music from the Savoy Hotel with sounds of the hotel's purported destruction by trench mortars. The broadcast also claimed that the Houses of Parliament and the Clock Tower had been destroyed.

Because the broadcast occurred on a snowy weekend, newspaper delivery was unavailable to much of the United Kingdom for several days. The lack of newspapers caused a minor panic, as people believed that the broadcast events in London were to blame. In May 1926, there was considerable public disorder during the General Strike, so people were previously open to the possibility of a revolution.

In a 1980s interview for his biography This is Orson Welles (1992), Orson Welles says that the BBC broadcast gave him the idea for his own 1938 CBS Radio dramatization of "The War of the Worlds", which led to a similar panic among some American listeners. A 2005 BBC report also suggested that the Knox broadcast may have influenced Welles.

The script of the broadcast is reprinted in Essays in Satire (1928) as "A Forgotten Interlude".

== Knox's Ten Rules for Detective Fiction ==
The majority of novels of Knox's era, dubbed The Golden Age of Detective Fiction, were "whodunits" with codified rules to allow the reader to attempt to solve the mystery before the detective. According to Knox, a detective story

must have as its main interest the unravelling of a mystery; a mystery whose elements are clearly presented to the reader at an early stage in the proceedings, and whose nature is such as to arouse curiosity, a curiosity which is gratified at the end.

He expanded upon this definition by giving ten rules of writing detective fiction:

1. The criminal must be mentioned in the early part of the story, but must not be anyone whose thoughts the reader has been allowed to know.
2. All supernatural or preternatural agencies are ruled out as a matter of course.
3. Not more than one secret room or passage is allowable.
4. No hitherto undiscovered poisons may be used, nor any appliance which will need a long scientific explanation at the end.
5. No Chinaman must figure in the story. (Note: This opinion of Knox was a product of the racist attitudes of the time.)
6. No accident must ever help the detective, nor must he ever have an unaccountable intuition which proves to be right.
7. The detective himself must not commit the crime.
8. The detective is bound to declare any clues which he may discover.
9. The "sidekick" of the detective, the Watson, must not conceal from the reader any thoughts which pass through his mind: his intelligence must be slightly, but very slightly, below that of the average reader.
10. Twin brothers, and doubles generally, must not appear unless we have been duly prepared for them.

== Publications ==
=== Selected works ===
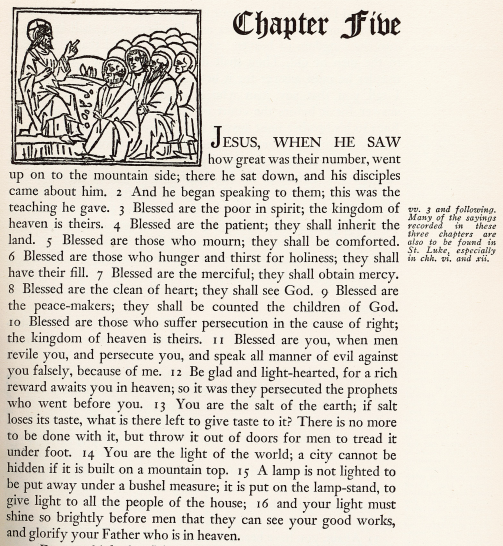

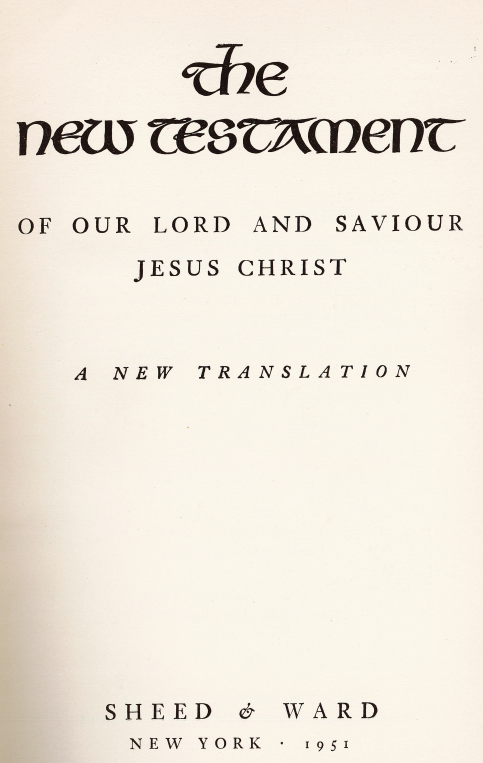
Title page of Knox's New Testament

- Knox Bible, a translation of the Latin Vulgate
- Some Loose Stones: Being a Consideration of Certain Tendencies in Modern Theology Illustrated by Reference to the Book Called "Foundations" (1913)
- Absolute and Abitofhell (1913). A satire in the manner of Dryden on the latitudinarianism of the authors of Foundations (including William Temple, later Archbishop of Canterbury).
- The Church in Bondage (1914). Sermons
- Reunion All Round (1914). A satire on the readiness of certain Anglicans to sink doctrinal differences with the Nonconformist sects in the interests of Christian good fellowship.
- Bread or Stone (1915). Four addresses on impetrative or petitionary prayer.
- A Spiritual Aeneid: Being an Account of a Journey to the Catholic Faith (1918)
- Meditations on the Psalms (1919)
- Patrick Shaw-Stewart (1920). Biography of Patrick Shaw-Stewart, who died on active service in the First World War.
- Memories of the Future: Being Memories of the Years 1915–1972, Written in the Year of Grace 1988 by Opal, Lady Porstock (1923). Combines a parody of the current autobiographies of women of fashion with a gentle satire on current whims—educational, medical, political and theological.
- Sanctions: A Frivolity (1924). A fiction in which the guests at a country-house party find all their conversations turning towards the question, what are the ultimate sanctions, social, intellectual, supernatural, which determine human behaviour and destiny?
- Other Eyes Than Ours (1926). A satirical tale about a hoax played on a circle of spiritualists.
- An Open-Air Pulpit (1926). Essays.
- The Belief of Catholics (1927). His survey of Catholic belief, considered a classic of apologetics and a Catholic equivalent to C. S. Lewis's Mere Christianity. Authorized new edition published in 2022 (Providence, RI: Cluny Media).
- Essays in Satire (1928). Contains his Anglican humorous writings, with some subsequent literary essays."
- The Mystery of the Kingdom and Other Sermons (1928).
- The Church on Earth (1929).
- On Getting There (1929). Essays.
- Caliban in Grub Street (1930). A satire on the religious opinions of some of the chief popular writers of the day (including Arnold Bennett and Sir Arthur Conan Doyle).
- Broadcast Minds (1932). A criticism of the religious opinions of some of the leading scientific publicists of the time (including Julian Huxley and Bertrand Russell).
- Difficulties: Being a Correspondence About the Catholic Religion, with Arnold Lunn (1932). An exchange of letters with Lunn about the Catholic Church. Lunn later converted.
- Heaven and Charing Cross: Sermons on the Holy Eucharist (1935)
- Barchester Pilgrimage (1935). A sequel to the Chronicles of Barsetshire written in the style of Trollope. It follows the fortunes of the children and grandchildren of Trollope's characters up to the time of writing, with some gentle satire on the social, political and religious changes of the 20th century. It was reprinted in 1990 by the Trollope Society.
- Let Dons Delight (1939). One of Knox's most famous works, though currently out of print. Taking as its subject the history of Oxford from the Reformation to shortly before World War II, it traces the disintegration of a common culture through the conversations of the dons of Simon Magus, a fictional college, first in 1588, and then by fifty-year intervals until 1938.
- Captive Flames (1940). Twenty-one homilies on some of Knox's favourite saints, including St Cecilia, St Dominic, St Joan of Arc and St Ignatius of Loyola. Authorized new edition published in 2022 (Providence, RI: Cluny Media).
- In Soft Garments (1942). Addresses to Oxford students on faith in the modern world.
- God and the Atom (1945). An ethical and philosophical analysis of the shock of the atomic bomb, its use against Hiroshima and Nagasaki and the moral questions arising therefrom.
- The Mass in Slow Motion (1948). A book of talks for schoolgirls which, with its two successors, became the most popular of all Knox's writings. Authorized new edition published in 2022 (Providence, RI: Cluny Media).
- The Creed in Slow Motion (1949). The second book of his talks for schoolgirls. Authorized new edition published in 2022 (Providence, RI: Cluny Media).
- On Englishing the Bible (1949). Book of 8 essays about re-translating the Bible from the Latin Vulgate, with Hebrew/Greek sources.
- The Gospel in Slow Motion (1950). The final book of his talks for schoolgirls. Authorized new edition published in 2022 (Providence, RI: Cluny Media).
- St Paul's Gospel (1950). A series of Lenten sermons preached that year by Knox in Westminster Cathedral.
- Enthusiasm: A Chapter in the History of Religion with Special Reference to the XVII and XVIII Centuries (1950). Knox's own favourite book, it is a study of the various movements of Christian men and women who have tried to live a less worldly life than other Christians, claiming the direct guidance of the Holy Spirit, and eventually splitting off into separate sects. Quietism and Jansenism seemed to be the primary foci.
- Stimuli (1951). A selection of his monthly contributions to The Sunday Times.
- The Hidden Stream: Mysteries of the Christian Faith (1952). Addresses to Oxford students in which Knox evaluates fundamental dogmas and stumbling blocks of Catholicism.
- Off the Record (1953). A selection of fifty-one letters addressed to individual inquirers on religious topics of general interest.
- In Soft Garments: A Collection of Oxford Conferences (1953).
- The Window in the Wall and Other Sermons on the Holy Eucharist (1956)
- Bridegroom and Bride (1957). Wedding addresses.
- Literary Distractions (1958). Essays on writers, Trollope's Barsetshire etc.
- Lightning Meditations (1959). Short sermons.

=== Detective fiction ===
==== Miles Bredon mysteries ====
- The Three Taps (1927, novel)
- The Footsteps at the Lock (1928, novel) – Serialised, Westminster Gazette, 1928
- "Solved by Inspection" (1931, short story)
- The Body in the Silo (1933, novel)
- Still Dead (1934, novel)
- Double Cross Purposes (1937, novel)

==== Novels ====
- The Viaduct Murder (1925)

==== Short stories ====
- "The Motive" (1937)
- "The Adventure of the First Class Carriage" (1947) – a Sherlock Holmes pastiche.

==== Collaborative works by the Detection Club ====
- Behind the Screen (1930) (six contributors including Knox)
- The Floating Admiral (1931) (fourteen contributors including Knox)
- Six Against the Yard (1936) (six contributors including Knox)

== See also ==
- Golden Age of Detective Fiction

== Sources ==
- Corbishley, Thomas; Speaight, Robert. Ronald Knox, the priest the writer (1965) online free
- Dayras, Solange. "The Knox Version, or the Trials of a Translator: Translation or Transgression?." Translating Religious Texts, edited by David Jasper, 44-59. Palgrave Macmillan, London, 1993.
- Duhn, Hugo R. A Thematization and Analysis of the Spirituality in the Writings of Ronald A. Knox, 1888-1957, STD dissertation, Studies in Sacred Theology, 2nd Series, No. 284, Catholic University of America, 1981.
- Marshall, George. "Two Autobiographical Narratives of Conversion: Robert Hugh Benson and Ronald Knox." British Catholic History 24.2 (1998): 237-253.
- Rooney, David M. The Wine of Certitude: A Literary Biography of Ronald Knox (San Francisco: Ignatius Press. 2009).
- Tastard, Terry. Ronald Knox and English Catholicism (Leominster: Gracewing, 2009).
- Waugh, Evelyn (1959). The Life of Ronald Knox. Chapman and Hall.
