= The Monster of Grammont =

1931 novel

- First edition (US)
- Author: George Goodchild
- Language: English
- Genre: Thriller
- Publisher: Hodder and Stoughton (UK); Mystery League (US)
- Publication date: 1927
- Publication place: United Kingdom
- Media type: Print

The Monster of Grammont is a 1927 mystery thriller novel by the British writer George Goodchild, a prolific author of thrillers in the style of Edgar Wallace and Sydney Horler. It uses the elements of the traditional country house mystery, with the setting shifted to Continental Europe in the interwar years. This was one of the most popular of his numerous writings, released by Hodder and Stoughton. It was published in America by The Mystery League in 1931.

== Synopsis ==
It features two former British army officers who return to the chateau in France where they had gone to recuperate after being wounded in the First World War. A legendary monster is supposed to haunt the estate of Grammont, but they begin to suspect that it may have something to do with the associates of one of the maids.

== Bibliography ==
- Nicholls, Peter. The Encyclopedia of Science Fiction: An Illustrated A to Z. 1979.
- The Times Literary Supplement Index, 1902-1939, Volume 1, 1978,
