= Nicolas Grenier (poet) =

French poet and songwriter

Nicolas Grenier is a French poet and songwriter. He lives in Paris.

He is a graduate of the Paris Institute of Political Studies and Sorbonne. Nicolas Grenier is a professor at the HEC Paris.

Fifty international and French reviews (Tower Journal) publish his poems in fifteen languages.

He is a figure of Japanese poems with tanka and haiku. His first collection of poems about Saint-Germain-des-Pres has the Paul Eluard Prize.

He works with international artists about music and photography.

He translates in French with David Rochefort Barack Obama's poems, Pop and Underground.

He writes with American composer tributes to Bill Gates, Warren Buffett, John Fitzgerald Kennedy, Ludwig Wittgenstein and places Marrakesh and Paris.

== Music ==
- Windows to Bill Gates or Paul Allen and History of Windows, The Implicit Order, American band, (Nicolas Grenier / Anthony Washburn);
- John Fitzgerald Kennedy and the Toddler Nicholas from Paris in Five Stories, The Implicit Order, American band, (Nicolas Grenier / Anthony Washburn);
- Dreaming in the Southern Polar Cap of Your Thin Arms, Bruce Leitch, American composer (Nicolas Grenier / Bruce Leitch);
- How Long is Her Hair in a Projection Room? Statistical and Fractional Dimension, Robert Lewinski, English composer, (Robert Lewinski, Nicolas Grenier);
- Marrakech Below the Waterline Schweppes Symphony, Anna Stereopoulou, Greek composer, (Nicolas Grenier / Anna Stereopoulou);
- A Cosmos is a Harmonious and Philosophical System, Bruce Leitch, American composer (Nicolas Grenier / Bruce Leitch);
- (In Her Eyes) Space is Curved and it is Possible to Have a Straight Line, Elizabeth Veldon, English composer (Nicolas Grenier / Elizabeth Veldon);
- Sur le Chemin La Nuit, Marco Lucchi, Italian composer (Nicolas Grenier / Marco Lucchi);
- Timeline of Cosmological Theories or Sloan Great Wall, Javier Rosendo, Spanish composer (Nicolas Grenier / Javier Rosendo);
- The Voice in Your Hand, Motohiko Hirami, Japanese composer (Nicolas Grenier / Motohiko Hirami);
- The First Day of Your New Life (From Mount Sinai), Motohiko Hirami, Japanese composer (Nicolas Grenier / Motohiko Hirami) .
