= Pomes Penyeach =

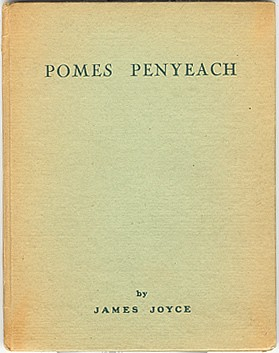
- Cover of first edition (Powells.com)
- Author: James Joyce
- Language: English
- Genre: poetry
- Publisher: Shakespeare and Company
- Publication date: 1927
- Publication place: Ireland
- Media type: Print (Hardback & Paperback)
- Pages: 47
- ISBN: 978-1-112-86350-9

Pomes Penyeach is a collection of thirteen short poems written by James Joyce published in 1927. It was the second collection he published after Chamber Music.

== Overview ==
Pomes Penyeach was written over a 20-year period, from 1904 to 1924, and originally published on 7 July 1927 by Shakespeare and Company, for the price of one shilling (twelve pence) or twelve francs. The title is a play on "poems" and pommes (the French word for apples) which are here offered at "a penny each" in either currency. It was the custom for Irish tradespeople of the time to offer their customers a "tilly" (in Irish, tuilleadh) or extra serving – just as English bakers had developed the tradition of the "baker's dozen", offering thirteen loaves instead of twelve. The first poem of Pomes Penyeach is entitled "Tilly" and represents the bonus offering of this penny-a-poem collection. (The poem was originally entitled "Cabra", after the Cabra district of Dublin where Joyce was living at the time of his mother's death.)

The poems were initially rejected for publication by Ezra Pound. Although paid scant attention on its initial publication, this slender volume (which contains fewer than 1000 words in total) has proven surprisingly durable, and a number of its poems (particularly "Tilly", "A flower given to my daughter", "On the beach at Fontana", and "Bahnhofstrasse") continue to appear in anthologies to this day.

Pomes Penyeach contains a number of Joycean neologisms ("rosefrail", "moongrey" and "sindark", for example) created by melding two words into a new compound. The word "love" appears thirteen times in this collection of thirteen short poems (and the word "heart" appears almost as frequently) in a variety of contexts. Sometimes romantic love is intended, in tones that vary from sentimental or nostalgic ("O sighing grasses,/ Vainly your loveblown bannerets mourn!") to scathing ("They mouth love's language. Gnash/ The thirteen teeth/ Your lean jaws grin with"). Yet at its best Joyce's poetry achieves, like his prose, a sense of vitality and loving compassion. ("From whining wind and colder/ Grey sea I wrap him warm/ And touch his trembling fineboned shoulder/ And boyish arm. // Around us fear, descending/ Darkness of fear above/ And in my heart how deep unending/ Ache of love!")

== Contents ==
The contents of Pomes Penyeach are listed below, with the date and place of each composition:

- "Tilly" (Dublin, 1904; originally known as "Cabra" then retitled to "Ruminants" before settling on "Tilly")
- "Watching the Needleboats at San Sabba" (Trieste, 1912)
- "A Flower Given to My Daughter" (Trieste, 1913)
- "She Weeps over Rahoon" (Trieste, 1913)
- "Tutto è sciolto" (Trieste, 13 July 1914)
- "On the Beach at Fontana" (Trieste, 1914)
- "Simples" (Trieste, 1914)
- "Flood" (Trieste, 1915)
- "Nightpiece" (Trieste, 22 January 1915)
- "Alone" (Zurich, 1916)
- "A Memory of the Players in a Mirror at Midnight" (Zurich, 1917)
- "Bahnhofstrasse" (Zurich, 1918)
- "A Prayer" (Paris, 1924)
