= Insurance investigator =

Person who assesses insurance claims

An insurance investigator examines insurance claims that are suspicious or otherwise in doubt. Investigators in this field have differing specialties and backgrounds. Some insurance companies have their own in-house investigation teams while other companies sub-contract the work to private investigators or private investigation firms. Although such investigations are usually conducted to combat fraud, very often investigators will be working simply to establish the circumstances of a particular claim (for example, in a multi-vehicular road accident involving various parties, claims and insurance companies).

== Insurance fraud ==
Methods of defrauding insurance companies are manifold, as are the means of investigating them. As a crime, however, evidence shows that insurance fraud in wealthy nations is increasing, with many governments running public awareness campaigns to deter potential fraudsters and appeal to the public to report any suspicious claims.

One of the most common forms of insurance fraud is the exaggeration of injuries. Because many injuries can be exceptionally difficult to quantify (for example, psychological injuries or physical injuries such as whiplash), investigators will often seek to establish that what the claimant claims is true (for example, if a claimant states he or she cannot work) and that there are no obvious discrepancies in the symptoms claimed (very often examined in conjunction with medical staff). Surveillance is often employed in such circumstances to verify the claim.

Another form of lesser known fraud is that of claiming on an insurance policy for injuries sustained before the policy came into effect. For example, in a road accident, a person may claim to have sustained a debilitating back injury. On investigation, however, it transpires that the injury had been sustained in an incident some months or even years before. Very often insurance companies and investigators will study medical reports and history to eliminate this possibility, as well as searching for evidence of previous claims or accidents.

There are also many forms of fraud involving property, for example when a person with valuable assets (property, for example) deliberately destroys them, often through arson, with the intention of then claiming the value back through insurance. Another form would be an art collector insuring a high value piece and then having it 'stolen' - claiming the money for himself and keeping the art piece in the process.

== In fiction ==
Between 1927 and 1937 the insurance investigator Miles Bredon appeared on a series of novels by the British author Ronald Knox. Employed by the large London-based Indescribable Insurance Company, Bredon is frequently called in to fix puzzling cases as one of the Golden Age Detectives.

Yours Truly, Johnny Dollar, which aired on the CBS Radio Network from 1949 to 1962, featured "the transcribed adventures of the man with the action-packed expense account – America's fabulous freelance insurance investigator."

The 1964 British film Smokescreen follows an insurance investigator assessing the apparent death of a businessman.

In 1997-98 the BBC showed a series called The Broker's Man, starring Kevin Whately as insurance investigator Jimmy Griffin.

In the 2008 US television series Leverage, the character Nate Ford is a former insurance investigator, having quit after his company refused to pay for his son's treatment. His experience as an ex-insurance investigator often comes into play when planning the cons he and his crew pull as part of the show's main premise.
