= 1930 in literature =

This article contains information about the literary events and publications of 1930.

== Events ==
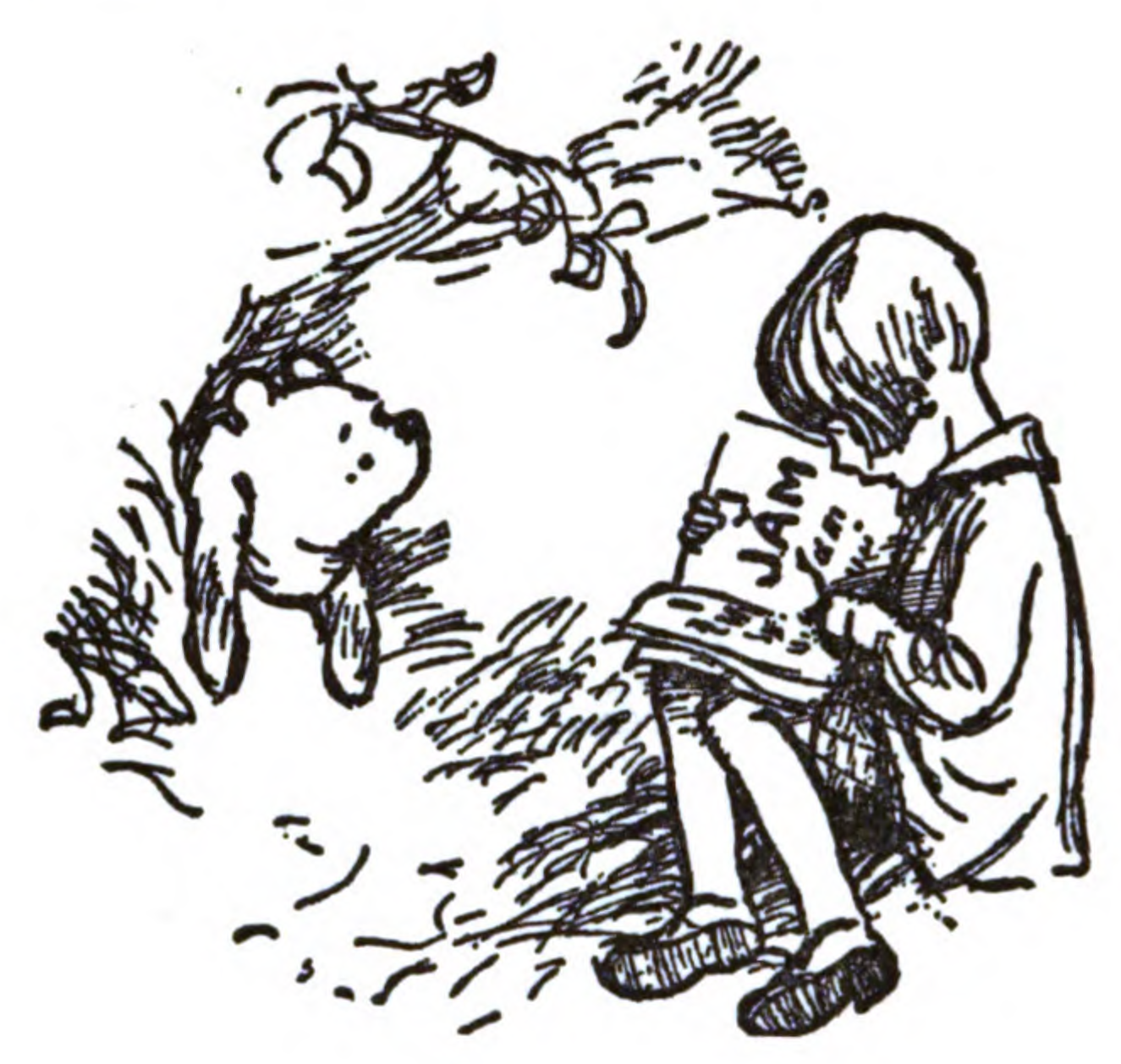
Winnie-the-Pooh listening to Christopher Robin, Winnie-the-Pooh (1926); illustration by E. H. Shepard.

- January 6 – An early literary character-licensing agreement is signed by A. A. Milne, giving Stephen Slesinger U.S. and Canadian merchandising rights to the Winnie-the-Pooh works.
- February – The Censorship of Publications Board begins to function in the Irish Free State. Among the first 13 books banned (announced in May) are Point Counter Point by Aldous Huxley, The Well of Loneliness by Radclyffe Hall and several on sex and marriage by Margaret Sanger and Marie Stopes.
- February 23 – Erich Maria Remarque's anti-war novel All Quiet on the Western Front (Im Westen nichts Neues, 1929) is banned in Thuringian schools by Education Minister Wilhelm Frick.
- March 19 – Paul Robeson plays the title role of Othello at the Savoy Theatre, London, with Peggy Ashcroft as Desdemona.
- May 6 – The Collins Crime Club is launched as a crime fiction imprint by the U.K. firm William Collins.
- May 10 – John Masefield becomes Poet Laureate of the United Kingdom.
- July 14 – Luigi Pirandello's The Man with the Flower in His Mouth becomes the first broadcast television drama, by the BBC in England, directed by Val Gielgud.
- July 19 – Georges Simenon's Detective Inspector Jules Maigret makes a first appearance in print, under Simenon's own name after he abandons pseudonyms, in the novel Pietr-le-Letton (The Strange Case of Peter the Lett), which begins serialization in the French weekly magazine Ric et Rac published by Fayard. It will appear in book form in 1931 as the fifth of 75 novels (and 28 short stories) in which Simenon features the pipe-smoking Paris detective.
- September 11 – Agatha Christie marries archaeologist Max Mallowan in Edinburgh.
- September 24 – The first production of Noël Coward's comedy Private Lives opens at the Phoenix Theatre (London), featuring Coward, Gertrude Lawrence and Laurence Olivier in the cast.
- September 29 – The English satirical novelist Evelyn Waugh joins the Catholic Church.
- October 13 – Agatha Christie's The Murder at the Vicarage, the first full-length novel to feature her amateur detective Miss Marple, appears in the U.K. in the Collins Crime Club series, after serialization in the United States.
- November 5 – American novelist Sinclair Lewis is awarded the Nobel Prize in Literature.
- December 10 – The first performance of Bertolt Brecht's Lehrstück The Decision (Die Maßnahme), written in collaboration with Slatan Dudow and the composer Hanns Eisler, occurs at the Großes Schauspielhaus in Berlin, with Ernst Busch as lead.
- unknown dates
  - John Langalibalele Dube publishes the historical novella Insila kaShaka, the first work of fiction in the Zulu language.
  - Franz Kafka's novel The Castle (1926) is translated into English for the first time, by Willa and Edwin Muir.

== New books ==
=== Fiction ===
- Vicki Baum – Grand Hotel
- E. F. Benson – The Inheritor
- Max Brand – Destry Rides Again (original serial version as Twelve Peers)
- Lynn Brock – Q.E.D.
- Pearl S. Buck – East Wind: West Wind
- John Dickson Carr – It Walks By Night
- Leslie Charteris – Enter the Saint
- Gabriel Chevallier – La Peur (Fear)
- Agatha Christie
  - The Murder at the Vicarage
  - The Mysterious Mr. Quin
  - Giant's Bread (as Mary Westmacott)
- Albert Cohen – Solal of the Solals
- Ferreira de Castro – A Selva (The Forest: A Tale of the Amazon Rubber Tappers)
- J. J. Connington – The Two Tickets Puzzle
- Freeman Wills Crofts – Sir John Magill's Last Journey
- John Dos Passos – The 42nd Parallel
- William Faulkner – As I Lay Dying
- Dorothy Canfield Fisher – The Deepening Stream
- R. Austin Freeman – Mr. Pottermack's Oversight
- Gaito Gazdanov – An Evening with Claire
- Anthony Gilbert – The Night of the Fog
- Jean Giono – Second Harvest
- Milt Gross – He Done Her Wrong: the Great American Novel (wordless novel)
- H. Rider Haggard – Belshazzar
- Dashiell Hammett – The Maltese Falcon
- A. P. Herbert – The Water Gipsies
- Hermann Hesse – Narcissus and Goldmund
- Georgette Heyer – Powder and Patch
- Robert Hichens – The Bracelet
- Sydney Horler – Checkmate
- Langston Hughes – Not Without Laughter
- Ianthe Jerrold – Dead Man's Quarry
- Margaret Kennedy – The Fool of the Family
- Oliver La Farge – Laughing Boy
- D. H. Lawrence
  - Love Among the Haystacks and Other Stories
  - The Virgin and the Gypsy (novella)
- Norman Lindsay – Redheap
- Bata LoBagola (Joseph Howard Lee) – LoBagola: An African Savage's Own Story (fictional autobiography)
- Benito Lynch – The Romance of a Gaucho
- Philip MacDonald – The Noose
- Compton Mackenzie – April Fools
- André Malraux – The Royal Way (La Voie royale)
- Frederic Manning (as "Private 19022") – Her Privates We (first trade edition)
- Katherine Mansfield (died 1923) – The Aloe
- W. Somerset Maugham – Cakes and Ale
- Gladys Mitchell – The Longer Bodies
- George Moore
  - Aphrodite in Aulis
  - A Flood
- Paul Morand – World Champions (Champions du monde)
- Robert Musil – The Man Without Qualities (Der Mann ohne Eigenschaften; publication begins)
- Stratis Myrivilis – Η ζωή εν τάφω (I zoí en tafo, "Life in the Tomb"; book publication)
- Vladimir Nabokov
  - The Defense
  - The Eye
- Irène Némirovsky – Le Bal
- E. Phillips Oppenheim
  - The Lion and the Lamb
  - The Million Pound Deposit
- Camil Petrescu – Ultima noapte de dragoste, întâia noapte de război (The Last Night of Love, the First Night of War)
- Sol Plaatje – Mhudi (written 1919–20)
- J. B. Priestley – Angel Pavement
- Ellery Queen – The French Powder Mystery
- Joseph Roth – Job
- Rafael Sabatini – The King's Minion
- Ernst von Salomon – The Outlaws
- Dorothy L. Sayers
  - Strong Poison
  - The Documents in the Case (written with Robert Eustace)
- Nan Shepherd – The Weatherhouse
- Upton Sinclair – Mental Radio
- Olaf Stapledon – Last and First Men
- Cecil Street
  - Peril at Cranbury Hall
  - The Secret of High Eldersham
- Miguel de Unamuno – San Manuel Bueno, Mártir
- Ion Vinea – Paradisul suspinelor (A Haven for the Sighs)
- Edgar Wallace
  - The Clue of the Silver Key
  - The Lady of Ascot
- Hugh Walpole – Rogue Herries
- Evelyn Waugh – Vile Bodies
- Dorothy Whipple – High Wages
- Thornton Wilder – The Woman of Andros
- Stanisław Ignacy Witkiewicz – Insatiability (Nienasycenie)
- Gamel Woolsey – One Way of Love (written; published 1987)
- Philip Gordon Wylie – Gladiator
- E. H. Young – Miss Mole
- Francis Brett Young – Jim Redlake

=== Children and young people ===
- William S. Gray – first in the Dick and Jane series of Elson-Gray Readers
- "Carolyn Keene" – The Secret of the Old Clock (first in the Nancy Drew Mystery Stories series)
- André Maurois – Fattypuffs and Thinifers (Patapoufs et Filifers; illustrated by Jean Bruller)
- Anne Parrish – Floating Island
- Watty Piper – The Little Engine That Could
- Beatrix Potter – The Tale of Little Pig Robinson
- Gwynedd Rae – Mostly Mary (first in the Mary Plain series of 14 books)
- Arthur Ransome – Swallows and Amazons (first in the Swallows and Amazons series of 12 books)
- Ruth Plumly Thompson – The Yellow Knight of Oz (24th in the Oz series overall and the 10th written by her)
- Marion St John Webb – Mr Papingay's Flying Shop (first in the Papingay series of four books)
- Sadie Rose Weilerstein – The Adventures of K'tonton: a Little Jewish Tom Thumb

=== Drama ===
- Rudolf Besier – The Barretts of Wimpole Street
- Antoine Bibesco – Ladies All
- Bertolt Brecht
  - Rise and Fall of the City of Mahagonny (Aufstieg und Fall der Stadt Mahagonny)
  - The Decision (Die Maßnahme)
- Ferdinand Bruckner – Elisabeth von England (Elizabeth of England)
- Jean Cocteau – The Human Voice (La Voix humaine)
- Marc Connelly – The Green Pastures
- Noël Coward – Private Lives
- Ian Hay and Guy Bolton – A Song of Sixpence
- Ian Hay and P. G. Wodehouse – Leave It to Psmith
- Georgia Douglas Johnson – Blue-Eyed Black Boy
- Fred Duprez – My Wife's Family
- Geoffrey Kerr – London Calling
- Kwee Tek Hoay – Nonton Tjapgome (Watching the Lantern Festival)
- Sidney Howard – Marseilles
- Federico García Lorca
  - The Public (El público) (written)
  - The Shoemaker's Prodigious Wife (La zapatera prodigiosa)
- Patrick MacGill – Suspense
- Quintero brothers – Mariquilla Terremoto
- Will Scott – The Limping Man
- Edgar Wallace
  - On the Spot
  - The Mouthpiece
  - Smoky Cell
- Emlyn Williams – A Murder Has Been Arranged
- Christa Winsloe – Ritter Nérestan (written as Gestern und heute, translated as Children in Uniform)
- W. B. Yeats – The Words Upon The Window Pane

=== Poetry ===
- W. H. Auden – Poems
- Samuel Beckett – Whoroscope
- Hart Crane – The Bridge
- Laxmi Prasad Devkota – Muna Madan (मुनामदन)
- T. S. Eliot – Ash Wednesday
- D. Iacobescu (died 1913) – Quasi
- P. H. B. Lyon (editor) – The Discovery of Poetry

=== Non-fiction ===
- Adrian Bell – Corduroy
- Catherine Carswell – The Life of Robert Burns
- E. K. Chambers – William Shakespeare: A Study of Facts and Problems
- Alphonse Daudet (died 1897) – In the Land of Pain (La Doulou (La Douleur): 1887–1895 et Le Trésor d'Arlatan: 1897)
- William Empson – Seven Types of Ambiguity
- Dion Fortune – Psychic Self-Defence
- Sigmund Freud – Civilization and Its Discontents
- Muhammad Iqbal – The Reconstruction of Religious Thought in Islam
- James Jeans – The Mysterious Universe
- G. Wilson Knight – The Wheel of Fire: interpretations of Shakespearian tragedy
- Samuil Lehtțir and Iosif Vainberg – Întrebări literari (Literary Questions)
- Paul Morand – New York
- Edouard de Pomiane – Cuisine en dix minutes
- Alfred Rosenberg – The Myth of the Twentieth Century (Der Mythus des zwanzigsten Jahrhunderts)
- W. C. Sellar and R. J. Yeatman – 1066 and All That
- David Unaipon (credited to William Ramsay Smith) – Myths and Legends of the Australian Aboriginals
- Owen Wister – Roosevelt: The Story of a Friendship

== Births ==
- January 1 – Adunis (Ali Ahmad Said Esber), Syrian-born poet
- January 20 – Blair Lent, American children's author and illustrator (died 2009)
- January 23 – Derek Walcott, Saint Lucian poet and playwright (died 2017)
- February 15 – Bruce Dawe, Australian poet (died 2020)
- February 17 – Ruth Rendell (Ruth Barbara Grasemann), English detective and mystery novel writer (died 2015)
- February 18 – Gahan Wilson, American author and illustrator (died 2019)
- February 22 – Edward D. Hoch, American detective fiction writer (died 2008)
- February 23 – Paul West, English-born American novelist, poet and essayist (died 2015)
- March 2 – Tom Wolfe, American author, journalist (died 2018)
- March 8 – Douglas Hurd, English politician and novelist
- March 26 – Gregory Corso, American poet (died 2001)
- April 16 – Carol Bly, American teacher, author of short stories, essays and nonfiction (died 2007)
- May 3 – Juan Gelman, Argentine poet (died 2014)
- May 13 – José Jiménez Lozano, Spanish novelist (died 2020)
- May 14 – María Irene Fornés, Cuban-American playwright (died 2018)
- May 15 – Grace Ogot, Kenyan author (died 2015)
- May 19 – Lorraine Hansberry, African-American playwright (died 1965)
- May 21 – Stanley Wells, English Shakespearean scholar
- May 25 – Jón frá Pálmholti (Jón Kjartansson), Icelandic writer and journalist (died 2004)
- May 27 – John Barth, American fiction writer (died 2024)
- June 3 – Marion Zimmer Bradley, American writer (died 1999)
- June 10 – Grace Mirabella, American journalist, editor of Vogue 1971-88
- June 14 – Charles McCarry, American spy and novelist (died 2019)
- June 23 – Anthony Thwaite, English poet (died 2021)
- June 28 – Maureen Howard, American writer, editor and lecturer
- July 6 – Gloria Skurzynski, American author
- July 11 – Harold Bloom, American literary critic (died 2019)
- July 13 – Sam Greenlee, African American author (died 2014)
- July 15 – Jacques Derrida, French Algerian literary critic (died 2004)
- July 17 – Ray Galton, English scriptwriter (died 2018)
- August 8 – Barry Unsworth, English novelist (died 2012)
- August 9 – Carmen Balcells, Spanish literary agent (died 2015)
- August 17 – Ted Hughes, English poet laureate (died 1998)
- August 19 – Frank McCourt, Irish-American writer (died 2009)
- August 25 – Peter Trower, Canadian poet and novelist (died 2017)
- August 27 – Erzsébet Galgóczi, Hungarian novelist, playwright and screenwriter (died 1989)
- September 3 – Cherry Wilder, New Zealand novelist (died 2002)
- September 25 – Shel Silverstein, American poet (died 1999)
- September 29 – Colin Dexter, English detective fiction writer (died 2017)
- October 2 – Antonio Gala, Spanish poet, playwright and novelist
- October 10 – Harold Pinter, English dramatist (died 2008)
- October 18 – Esther Hautzig, Polish-born American autobiographer (died 2009)
- October 24 – Elaine Feinstein, English poet, novelist and literary biographer (died 2019)
- October 26 – Catherine Obianuju Acholonu, Nigerian researcher and poet (died 2014)
- October 27 – Francisca Aguirre, Spanish poet (died 2019)
- October 30 – Timothy Findley, Canadian author (died 2002)
- November 1 – A. R. Gurney, American dramatist (died 2017)
- November 5
  - Clifford Irving, American literary forger (died 2017)
  - Hans Mommsen, German historian (died 2015)
- November 12 – Irma Chilton, Welsh children's writer in Welsh and English (died 1990)
- November 15 – J. G. Ballard, English novelist and essayist (died 2009)
- November 16 – Chinua Achebe, Nigerian writer, academic and literary critic (died 2013)
- November 20 – Bai Hua, Chinese poet, dramatist and novelist (died 2019)
- November 27 – Rex Shelley, Singaporean author (died 2009)
- December 2 – Jon Silkin, English poet (died 1997)
- December 9 – Edoardo Sanguineti, Italian writer (died 2010)
- December 15 – Edna O'Brien, Irish fiction writer (died 2024)
- December 25 – Salah Jahin, Egyptian poet, lyricist, playwright and cartoonist (died 1986)

== Deaths ==
- January 9 – Edward Bok, American author (born 1863)
- January 16 – Johannes Gilhoff, German writer (born 1861)
- January 24 – Rebecca Latimer Felton, American writer, lecturer, reformer and politician (born 1835)
- February 9 – Alice Williams Brotherton, American author (born 1848)
- February 27
  - George Haven Putnam, American author and publisher (born 1844)
  - Joseph Wright, English philologist and lexicographer (born 1855)
- February 28 – Charles Kenneth Scott Moncrieff, Scottish writer and translator (born 1889)
- March 2 – D. H. Lawrence, English novelist and poet (born 1885)
- March 12 – Alois Jirásek, Czech novelist and dramatist (born 1851)
- March 13 – Mary Eleanor Wilkins Freeman, American author (born 1852)
- April 10 – Alfred Williams, English poet and steam-hammer operator (born 1877)
- April 14
  - Sigurd Ibsen, Norwegian politician and writer (born 1859)
  - Vladimir Mayakovsky, Russian poet, suicide (born 1893)
  - John B. Sheridan, Irish-American sports journalist (born 1870)
- April 21 – Robert Bridges, English poet and Poet Laureate (born 1844)
- April 22 – Jeppe Aakjær, Danish poet and novelist (born 1866)
- April 29 – Maria Polydouri, Greek poet (born 1902)
- May 12 – Iso Mutsu (睦磯, Gertrude Ethel Passingham), English-born Japanese travel writer (born 1867)
- May 15 – William John Locke, British Guiana-born English novelist and playwright (born 1863)
- May 16 – Florence Bell, English writer and playwright (born 1851)
- May 17 – Herbert Croly, American political writer (born 1869)
- June 9
  - Arthur St. John Adcock, English novelist and poet (born 1864)
  - Thomas Herbert Warren, English scholar and poet (born 1853)
- June 23 – Israel Gollancz, English Shakespeare scholar (born 1864)
- July 7 – Arthur Conan Doyle, Scottish writer of crime fiction (born 1859)
- July 26 – Pavlos Karolidis, Greek historian (born 1849)
- August 23 – Lucien Wolf, English journalist and historian (born 1857)
- August 29 – William Archibald Spooner, English academic and instigator of spoonerisms (born 1844)
- September 1 –Thomas Nicoll Hepburn (Gabriel Setoun), Scottish writer and poet (born 1861)
- September 4 – Vladimir Arsenyev, Russian travel writer and explorer (born 1872)
- September 5 – Georges de Porto-Riche, French novelist and dramatist (born 1849)
- September 18 –Karam Singh, Sikh historian (born 1884)
- September 25 – Arthur Way, English-born Australian classicist and translator (born 1847)
- October 4 – Olena Pchilka, Ukrainian writer, translator and publisher (born 1849)
- October 11 – Roy Horniman, English novelist and playwright (born 1868)
- October 16 – James Surtees Phillpotts, English writer and educator (born 1839)
- November 20 – William B. Hanna, American sportswriter (born 1866)
- November 21 – Jean-Marie-Raphaël Le Jeune, Canadian writer, linguist and Catholic priest (born 1855)
- December 8 – Florbela Espanca, Portuguese poet (born 1894)
- December 22
  - Neil Munro (Hugh Foulis), Scottish humorist, novelist and critic (born 1863)
  - Marion Manville Pope, American poet and author of juvenile literature (born 1859)

== Awards ==
- James Tait Black Memorial Prize for fiction: E. H. Young, Miss Mole
- James Tait Black Memorial Prize for biography: Francis Yeats-Brown, Lives of a Bengal Lancer
- Newbery Medal for children's literature: Rachel Field, Hitty, Her First Hundred Years
- Nobel Prize in Literature: Sinclair Lewis
- Prix Goncourt: Henri Fauconnier, Malaisie
- Pulitzer Prize for Drama: Marc Connelly, The Green Pastures
- Pulitzer Prize for Poetry: Conrad Aiken, Selected Poems
- Pulitzer Prize for the Novel: Oliver La Farge, Laughing Boy
