= They Knew Mr. Knight =

They Knew Mr. Knight may refer to:

- They Knew Mr. Knight (novel), a 1934 British novel by Dorothy Whipple
- They Knew Mr. Knight (film), a 1946 film adaptation directed by Norman Walker
