= Open All Night (1924 film) =

1924 film by Paul Bern

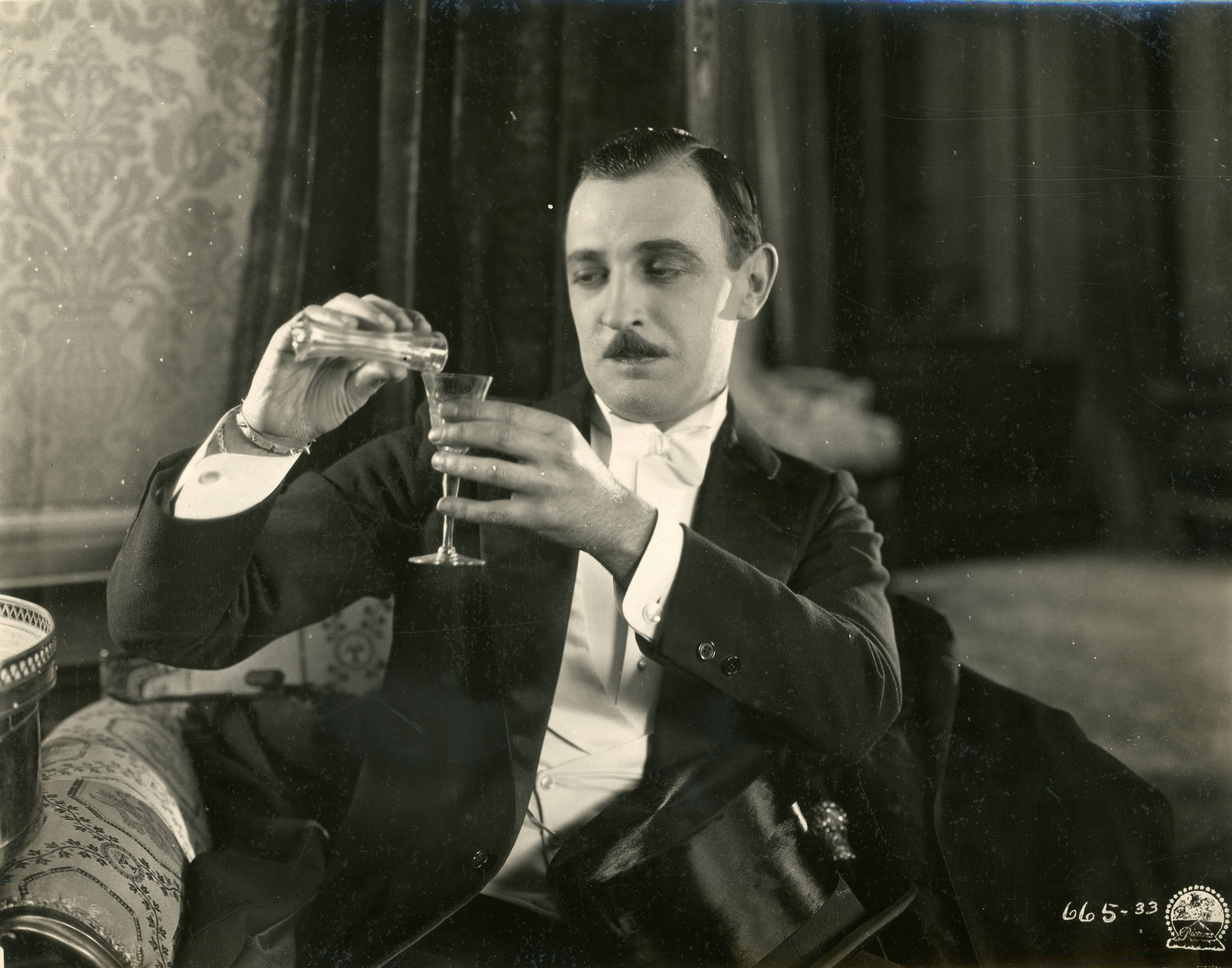
- Still with Raymond Griffith
- Directed by: Paul Bern
- Screenplay by: Willis Goldbeck
- Based on: Open All Night by Paul Morand
- Produced by: Adolph Zukor; Jesse L. Lasky
- Starring: Viola Dana; Raymond Griffith
- Cinematography: Bert Glennon
- Distributed by: Paramount Pictures
- Release date: October 13, 1924
- Running time: 64 minutes; 6 reels (5,671 feet)
- Country: United States
- Language: Silent (English intertitles)

Open All Night is a 1924 American silent comedy film produced by Famous Players–Lasky and released by Paramount Pictures. Paul Bern, better known as a writer and later husband of Jean Harlow, directed and Viola Dana, Jetta Goudal, and Raymond Griffith starred. The screenplay is based on Paul Morand's 1922 short story collection Open All Night. Actors Viola Dana and "Lefty" Flynn would soon marry after this film.

== Cast ==
- Viola Dana as Therese Duverne
- Jetta Goudal as Lea
- Adolphe Menjou as Edmund Duverne
- Raymond Griffith as Igor
- Maurice 'Lefty' Flynn as Petit Mathieu
- Gale Henry as Isabelle Fevre
- Jack Giddings as Von De Hoven
- Charles Puffy as Bibendum

unbilled

- Louise Emmons as Bicycle Race Spectator
- Reed Howes as American Bicyclist
- Bynunsky Hyman as Bicycle Race Spectator
- Joe Murphy as Bicycle Race Spectator
- Russ Powell as Gendarme
- Julian Rivero as French Bicyclist

== Preservation ==
Open All Night is an extant film at the Library of Congress, UCLA Film & Television Archive, George Eastman House Motion Picture Collection, and Cineteca Del Friuli.
