= Hécate =

1982 film

- Directed by: Daniel Schmid
- Screenplay by: Pascal Jardin; Daniel Schmid
- Based on: Hécate et ses chiens by Paul Morand
- Produced by: Marcel Hoehn
- Starring: Bernard Giraudeau; Lauren Hutton
- Cinematography: Renato Berta
- Edited by: Nicole Lubtchansky
- Music by: Carlos d'Alessio
- Production companies: T&C Film AG
- Distributed by: Gaumont Distribution
- Release date: 1982
- Running time: 105 minutes
- Country: Switzerland
- Language: French

Hécate is a 1982 Swiss drama film directed and co-written by Daniel Schmid. Adapted from Paul Morand’s novel Hécate et ses chiens, it stars Bernard Giraudeau and Lauren Hutton and follows a love story set in colonial-era Morocco. The film premiered in 1982 and was screened in competition at the 33rd Berlin International Film Festival in 1983. It was later screened at festivals including Buenos Aires, Ankara and Zurich.

== Synopsis ==
Adapted from Paul Morand’s novel Hécate et ses chiens, the film follows Julien Rochelle, a young French diplomat posted to North Africa. Restless in a community of displaced colonial figures, he meets Clothilde, and their casual liaison develops into an obsession that continues to affect him years later.

== Cast ==
The cast includes:

- Bernard Giraudeau as Julien Rochelle
- Lauren Hutton as Clothilde de Watteville
- Jean Bouise as Voudable, consul
- Jean-Pierre Kalfon as Massard
- Gérard Desarthe as Colonel de Watteville

== Reception ==
=== Awards and nominations ===
At the 1983 César Awards, Pascal Jardin and Daniel Schmid were nominated for Best Adaptation and Dialogue.

=== Critical response ===
Filmo described Hécate as a work of grand cinema, a classical love story set in Morocco’s diplomatic circles and given an absorbing visual style by Schmid and cinematographer Renato Berta. Filmdienst described the film as a colonial-era Moroccan love story that moves between melodrama and a subtly critical reinterpretation of male passion and self-destruction.

== Festival screenings ==
The film premiered in 1982. It was screened in competition at the 33rd Berlin International Film Festival in 1983. It was later screened at festivals including the Festival International du Film de La Rochelle in 1994, the Festival du Film de Genève in 1995, the 13th Buenos Aires International Independent Film Festival in 2011, the 24th Ankara International Film Festival in 2013, and the 12th Zurich Film Festival in 2016.

== See also ==
- Hecate (Greek goddess of magic and crossroads)
