= World Champions (novel) =

1930 novel by Paul Morand

- 1932 illustrated edition (French)
- Author: Paul Morand
- Original title: Champions du monde
- Translator: Hamish Miles
- Language: French
- Publisher: Éditions Grasset
- Publication date: 1930
- Publication place: France
- English publication date: 1931
- Pages: 276

World Champions (French: Champions du monde) is a 1930 novel by the French writer Paul Morand. It is set in the United States and follows four men who graduate from Columbia University in 1909, and decide to each become the world champion in his respective discipline. The book was published in English in 1931, translated by Hamish Miles.

== Reception ==
Virgilia Peterson Ross of The Outlook reviewed the book: "Insufiiciently appeased in his lust to express himself about America by the book on New York, M. Morand now tells a tale, part truth, you suspect, and largely fancy, of the four men he knew best, when, in 1909, he came over to teach French at Columbia. ... Through the dramatic outlets chosen by these men for their energy and through the women who, save one, loom up to block their hopes, M. Morand maintains his story at a pitch of tensity. Through their characters, boxed and labeled to fit a type, he snares his opportunity to generalize ad libidum about Americana, from sexual habits to the uses and abuses of justice." The critic continued: "He has a flair for acerbity, for bursting the bubbles of bombast, for trenchant ridicule. He is not afraid to bite. But he has, perhaps, in his self-confidence, bitten off more than he can chew."

The Bookman wrote: "The story is in every way characteristic of its author, though it is much inferior to Open All Night. It reads as if it had been written during one short sitting, and there are as many lurid details and incidents as there are pages. ... In his intoxication with size, splendour and success, Morand improves on the magazines devoted to the adialation of those things, but no one could improve on him."
