= L'Homme pressé =

L'Homme presse may refer to:

- The Man in a Hurry, a French novel from 1941 by Paul Morand (known in French as L'Homme pressé)
- Man in a Hurry, a 1977 French-Italian drama film
- L'Homme Presse (horse), a French thoroughbred racehorse
