= The Living Buddha =

1927 novel by Paul Morand

- First UK edition (publ. Knopf)
- Author: Paul Morand
- Original title: Bouddha vivant
- Translator: Eric Sutton
- Language: French
- Publisher: Éditions Grasset
- Publication date: 1927
- Publication place: France
- English publication date: 1927
- Pages: 247

The Living Buddha (French: Bouddha vivant) is a 1927 novel by the French writer Paul Morand. It tells the story of Jali, the hereditary prince of an East Asian kingdom, who travels to the Europe where he lives as a beggar in London and Paris, before he falls in love with the daughter of a Ku Klux Klan leader and follows her to America. The book was published in English in 1927, translated by Eric Sutton.

== Reception ==
Rose Lee wrote in The Bookman: "The incidents of the book are clearly fantastic, but the psychology that moves them is amusingly genuine. The result is a sophisticated and not too profound satire upon the ways of both East and West, done with Gallic lightness and good-humor." Theodore Purdy, Jr. of The Saturday Review wrote: "One may be amused at Morand's exceedingly Gallic version of New York in this year of grace, and also at the unlikely spectacle of Jali camping out in the Bois de Boulogne, a fakir tailored by Poole and receiving alms from the better part of the Parisian demi-monde. But his style and his mind are too alert, too bright and facile, to permit these things to stand forth as bare, absurd facts in the narrative. ... The result is strange, unexplainable by the usual canons of excellence, and thoroughly engrossing to read. "
