= Venices (book) =

1971 book by Paul Morand

- First edition (65 examples)
- Author: Paul Morand
- Original title: Venises
- Language: French
- Publisher: Éditions Gallimard
- Publication date: 1971
- Publication place: France
- English publication date: 2002
- Pages: 221

Venices (French: Venises) is a 1971 book by the French writer Paul Morand. Morand recounts his travels to Venice, often in the company of other famous writers and artists. An English translation by Euan Cameron was published in 2002.

== Reception ==
The Guardian's Nicholas Lezard wrote in 2002: "Paul Morand's Venices is so lush that at times one imagines one is reading a parody. ... Morand was the all-round aesthete; that is, he could be picky not just about his art but about the company he kept, as well as where he kept it. There are stories here, many of them first-hand, about Diaghilev, Proust, Renoir père, d'Annunzio, Les Six (there's a picture of them on page 110 which you can refer to whenever you get stuck trying to remember their names), Paul Claudel ('who handed out hard-boiled eggs, on which he had written poems, to each of us'), and a whole host of now-obscure statesmen, poets, writers, diplomats, courtiers."
