= Hecate and Her Dogs =

1954 novel by Paul Morand

- First edition (French)
- Author: Paul Morand
- Original title: Hécate et ses chiens
- Language: French
- Publisher: Éditions Flammarion
- Publication date: 1954
- Publication place: France
- English publication date: 2009
- Pages: 169

Hecate and Her Dogs (French: Hécate et ses chiens) is a 1954 novel by the French writer Paul Morand. It is set in Tangier in the 1920s, where a foreigner working for a bank takes on a mistress, who turns out to be sexually perverse, possibly a criminal. An English translation by David Coward was published in 2009.

== Reception ==
The Guardian's Nicholas Lezard wrote in 2009: "It is exactly because we are not provided with the details that the book is so unnerving. In effect, it is anti-pornography. Yet it is about a woman who, if her crimes were made public, would, we are led to believe, be vilified and damned as much as any contemporary abuser we can think of." Lezard continued: "I would not go to the firing squad saying that this book is about Morand's wartime guilt. (He did, by the way, make it to the Académie Française in 1968.) It is as creepy when considered purely as being about sex as about anything else. But this is why it's worth buying even this very short book for £10. It sticks with you."

== Adaptation ==
The French-Swiss film Hécate was directed by Daniel Schmid and stars Bernard Giraudeau and Lauren Hutton. It premiered in 1982 and played in competition at the 33rd Berlin International Film Festival.

== See also ==
- Hecate (Greek goddess of magic and crossroads)
