= They Were Sisters (novel) =

1943 novel

- First edition
- Author: Dorothy Whipple
- Language: English
- Genre: Drama
- Publisher: John Murray
- Publication date: 1943
- Publication place: United Kingdom
- Media type: Print

They Were Sisters is a 1943 novel by the British writer Dorothy Whipple. Three sisters marry shortly after the First World War and experience wildly differing experiences of family life over the next twenty years.

== Film adaptation ==
In 1945 it was adapted into a British film of the same title directed by Arthur Crabtree and starring James Mason, Phyllis Calvert, Dulcie Gray and Anne Crawford.

== Bibliography ==
- Goble, Alan. The Complete Index to Literary Sources in Film. Walter de Gruyter, 1999.
