= They Were Sisters =

1945 British film by Arthur Crabtree

- UK release poster
- Directed by: Arthur Crabtree
- Written by: Roland Pertwee
- Based on: They Were Sisters by Dorothy Whipple
- Produced by: Harold Huth
- Starring: Phyllis Calvert; James Mason; Hugh Sinclair; Anne Crawford; Peter Murray Hill; Dulcie Gray; Barry Livesey; Pamela Kellino
- Cinematography: Jack Cox
- Edited by: Charles Knott
- Music by: Louis Levy
- Production company: Gainsborough Pictures
- Distributed by: General Film Distributors
- Release dates: 2 July 1945 (UK); 23 July 1946 (US)
- Running time: 115 minutes
- Country: United Kingdom
- Language: English
- Box office: over £300,000 (UK) or over £1 million

They Were Sisters is a 1945 British melodrama film directed by Arthur Crabtree for Gainsborough Pictures and starring Phyllis Calvert and James Mason. The film was produced by Harold Huth, with cinematography from Jack Cox and screenplay by Roland Pertwee. They Were Sisters is noted for its frank, unsparing depiction of marital abuse at a time when the subject was rarely discussed openly. It was one of the Gainsborough melodramas.

== Plot ==
The film focuses on the lives of three sisters: Lucy, Vera and Charlotte. It opens at a dance in 1919, establishing their personalities and following them through courtship and marriage. While the sisters remain close to one another, their characters and paths through life are very different.

Lucy is the most stable, sensible, practical and in a happy marriage, whose greatest sadness is her inability to have children, which she sublimates by lavishing affection on her nephews and nieces. Vera is married with a child but the relationship is humdrum and loveless and she is restless and bored, indulging her appetite for adventure and excitement through a series of flirtations, which sometimes go beyond the bounds of the socially acceptable. Charlotte is a cowed drudge, suffering emotional abuse at the hands of her manipulative, brutal husband Geoffrey, who belittles and humiliates her in front of their three children.

The film shifts between the three households but its main focus is the way in which Lucy and Vera have to look on, unable to provide effective help despite their best attempts, as Charlotte's treatment by her husband (who, it is strongly implied, is also engaging in an unhealthy relationship with their elder daughter) becomes ever more shocking and she descends into alcoholism to blur her despair. A final attempt by Charlotte to flee Geoffrey ends in tragedy. Vera's marriage, too, crumbles as her husband discovers her in a serious extra-marital relationship and petitions for divorce. The film ends by showing Charlotte's and Vera's children being cared for by the childless Lucy.

== Cast ==
- Phyllis Calvert as Lucy Moore
- James Mason as Geoffrey Lee
- Hugh Sinclair as Terry Crawford
- Anne Crawford as Vera Sargeant
- Peter Murray Hill as William Moore
- Dulcie Gray as Charlotte Lee
- Barry Livesey as Brian Sargeant
- Pamela Kellino as Margaret Lee
- Ann Stephens as Judith Lee
- Brian Nissen as John Watson
- David Horne as Mr. Field
- Joss Ambler as Blakemore
- Roland Pertwee as Sir Hamish Nair
- Amy Veness as Mrs. Pursley
- Thorley Walters as Channing
- John Gilpin as Stephen Lee
- Brefni O'Rorke as Coroner
- Helen Stephens as Sarah Sargeant
- Roy Russell as Lethbridge
- Edie Martin as Cook
- Dora Sevening as Janet
- Helen Goss as Webster
- John Dodsworth as Cyril

== Background ==
Unlike most of the hugely successful melodramas made by Gainsborough during the mid-1940s, They Were Sisters has a near-contemporary rather than a costume setting, spanning the years from the end of the First World War, to the late 1930s. The screenplay was developed by Pertwee from a popular novel of the same name by Dorothy Whipple, published in 1943.

They Were Sisters features the spouses of both Mason and Calvert; Pamela Mason (billed under her first married name Pamela Kellino, and playing Mason's daughter, despite being only seven years younger) and Peter Murray Hill. Mason later admitted that he acted most of his bullying, sadistic role with a permanent hangover as a result of his using drinking as a means of dealing with the frustration he felt from his role and the British film industry in general.

== Reception ==
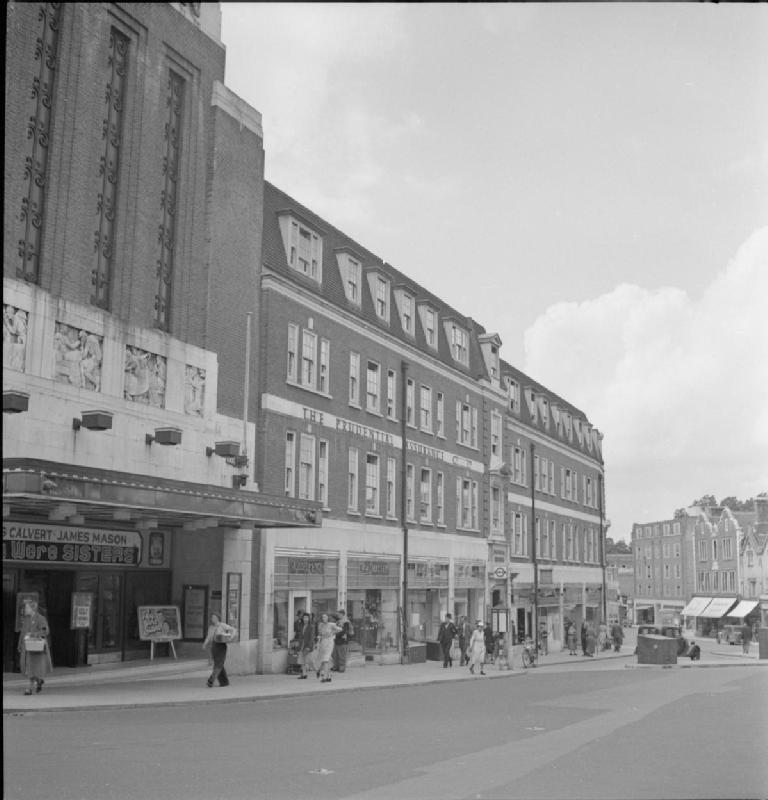
The film being shown at a cinema in Surrey, England

=== Box office ===
The film was very popular at the British box office, being one of the biggest hits of the year. According to Kinematograph Weekly the 'biggest winners' at the box office in 1945 Britain were The Seventh Veil, with "runners up" being (in release order), Madonna of the Seven Moons, Old Acquaintance, Frenchman's Creek, Mrs. Parkington, Arsenic and Old Lace, Meet Me in St. Louis, A Song to Remember, Since You Went Away, Here Come the Waves, Tonight and Every Night, Hollywood Canteen, They Were Sisters, The Princess and the Pirate, The Adventures of Susan, National Velvet, Mr. Skeffington, I Live in Grosvenor Square, Nob Hill, Perfect Strangers, The Valley of Decision, Conflict and Duffy's Tavern. British "runners up" were They Were Sisters, I Live in Grosvenor Square, Perfect Strangers, Madonna of the Seven Moons, Waterloo Road, Blithe Spirit, The Way to the Stars, I'll Be Your Sweetheart, Dead of Night, Waltz Time and Henry V.

Kinematograph Weekly called The Seventh Veil, Madonna of the Seven Moons, They Were Sisters and I'll Be Your Sweetheart "four dazzling examples of the box office wizardry of (Gainsborough) Ostrer."

=== Critical ===
The Times wrote, "the merit of this long and intelligent film lies in the skill with which it establishes the personalities of the sisters...the acting throughout has strength and sincerity."
