= Upper Radstowe =

Fictional place in novels of E. H. Young

Upper Radstowe was a fictional place used by the novelist E. H. Young.

It was based on Clifton, a fashionable inner district of the city of Bristol in South West England.

Upper Radstowe was the setting for seven novels:

- The Misses Mallett (1922)
- William (1925)
- Miss Mole (1930)
- Jenny Wren (1932)
- The Curate’s Wife (1934)
- Celia (1937)
- Chatterton Square (1947)
