= A Sunday Morning in the South =

A Sunday morning in the South is a one-act drama play by Georgia Douglas Johnson, published in 1924.The play is based in a small town in the South, and it focuses mainly on the topic of a Black family experiencing racial injustice and violence. Starring this is a grandmother and her two grandsons, as their quiet Sunday morning is disturbed by a police officer showing up to their home making a false accusation against one of her grandsons. Though it focuses on how someone's everyday life suddenly turned tragic, the play portrays themes of racism, mob violence, and the lack of legal protection for Black individuals mainly African American men during this time period.

== Plot summary ==
On an early quiet Sunday morning Sue Jones an elderly woman was in the kitchen making breakfast for her two grandsons who lives in the home with her Tom and Bossie Griggs as they get ready for church. This scene is presented as a normal and peaceful morning at first, showing a happy family moment. However, the mood and tone changes when Sue's neighbor, Liza comes over and begins talking about the horrifying news that happened late that night in the community. A white woman had been attacked, and white policemen are searching for a Black man to blame. This news that she just shared starts to create tension and frustration, as they come to realization of how dangerous these accusations made on a black man can be without proof.

As the conversation continues the sense of fear grows because it could only mean one thing someone will be blamed for a crime they didn't commit. Sue becomes very worried about Tom, knowing how often young black men are targeted in these situations. Her fears soon became reality when a police officer arrived at their home with the white women who had been attacked. Although the woman is very uncertain on who her attacker was, she identifies Tom as her attacker. Tom denied these accusations and tried to explain that he wasn't involved in this crime, but the officer doesn't consider nor listen to his side of the story where he is trying to explain that he had been home instead they arrested him and take him away without proper protocol.

After Tom is put in handcuffs by the officer, Sue cries out for him and refuses to accept what is happening to Tom and questioning how this could be possible. She sends Matilda to ask for help from the white family she once worked for, hoping their power and color might protect Tom and stop the situation from escalating. Sue holds on to hope that justice will overcome, and Tom will be proven innocent, however, the outcome ends very tragically. Before anyone could come help with getting Tom out of the situation, they had already lynched him. The play ends with this horrifying news, proving that racial injustice heavily exist in the South.Overall, the play just states what happen and how quickly false accusations can lead to violence and shows the lack of protection against black men are very limited.

== Production and reception ==
A Sunday Morning in the South by Georgia Douglas Johnson play was produced in the early 20th-century Black theater movement which it associated with the Harlem Renaissance, a time when many African Americans playwrights could only present their work outside of mainstream space dues to the racism that was happening. Because of this the play was only performed in community settings rather than in large theaters.

This play is based on a series of characters including Sue Jones (Elderly Grandmother), Tom Griggs and Bossie Griggs (Grandsons), her neighbor/friend (Liza Griggs) her friend (Matilda Brown), a white girl (the victim) and two white officers. These characters are based around a small Black family who is experiencing racism firsthand when Tom is being accused of committing a crime that he didn't commit which shows how trouble and racism will always follow you even when you're a good person.

== Historical background ==
A Sunday Morning in the South was written during the early 1900s, a time when racism and segregation was heavily rooted in American society, especially in the South. This period of time was known as the Jim Crow era that was made to keep black, and whites separated in public areas like the schools, restaurants, and even transportation. A Sunday Morning in the South wasn't able to be acted or printed out during Johnson's time nor was it available until James V Hatch and Ted Shine published it in their Black Theater USA in 1847–1974 under the "Black Folks Plays of the 1920s" section which goes to show that black people didn't have a chance to get their stories out because it was roughly hidden so that the whites could protect themselves.

One of the most important influences on the play is the amount of lynching during this time. Lynchings were mainly mobbing violences that targeted African American without any real evidence of a crime. Black men were often falsely accused of crimes, especially involving white women and these accusations led to deadly consequences without any evidence to prove otherwise. The reality of this is reflected in the events of the play, where fear and suspicion escalated into tragedy within seconds.

The play highlights the experiences of Black mothers and grandmothers who feel powerless to protect their children from racial violence and systemic injustice. Commentators have noted themes of fear, injustice, racism, and the impact of incarceration and law enforcement on African American communities. The historical context surrounding A Sunday Morning in the South has been cited as important for understanding the play's focus on protection, loss, and racial discrimination.

== Songs ==
The show is set next to a church, so, throughout the show, there is gospel music heard that interrupts the dialogue. The songs include:

- Let Your Light Shine on Me
- Alas! and did my Savior Bleed
- I Must Tell Jesus
