= And Yet They Paused =

1938 one-act play by Georgia Douglas Johnson

And Yet They Paused is a dramatic, one-act play presented in four scenes, by Georgia Douglas Johnson. Johnson wrote the play in 1938, in reaction to lynching. Like the rest of Johnson's lynching dramas, the play was not published during her lifetime.

== Characters ==
- Reverend Timothy Jackson
- Deacon Brown
- Joe Daniels, Victim (Mentioned and voiced, but not seen in the play)
- Boy
- Henry Williams, Delegate
- Elder, Jasper Greene
- Reporter
- Guard
- Telegraph Boy
- Senator
- Ensemble: Makes up the Church Group (Including First Sister, Second Sister, First Brother, Second Brother) and the Senate Group

== Setting ==
And Yet They Paused goes back and forth between a church service in Mississippi and a hallway outside of Congress in Washington, D.C.

== Plot ==
The play follows a church congregation in Mississippi waiting to hear if Congress is passing an anti-lynching bill. Members of the group tell the Reverend about Joe Daniels, a young African American man that was beaten and thrown out of town for bootlegging, who has been blamed for killing a white store keeper the night before. They later witness him being lynched and describe what they are watching as the mob outside attacks Daniels with a blow torch. Congress is drawing out the process of deciding whether or not to pass the bill until they get notice of this new lynching and the Senator insists that the bill must be passed.

== Johnson's Lynching Dramas ==
Johnson was the first playwright to develop a class of play specifically examining the injustice of lynching and how it effects families and communities. She wrote a series of plays on lynching but none were published during her lifetime. Johnson began sending play scripts to the National Association for the Advancement of Colored People (NAACP) in 1936, but they were returned to Johnson because in the endings of the plays, the characters seemed hopeless. In 1938, the NAACP asked Johnson to write a short play on the difficulties of passing a federal anti-lynching bill to be used in a demonstration. The NAACP 1937-1938 file, “Anti-Lynching Bill Play”, contained three scripts and correspondence about the writing of these. There were two fourteen-page long versions of And Yet They Paused, and a sixteen-page script called, A Bill to be Passed. They were not used in the demonstration, but the NAACP told Johnson that the scripts would be kept by the organization and would be available to the public.
