= Plumes (play) =

1927 play by Georgia Douglas Johnson

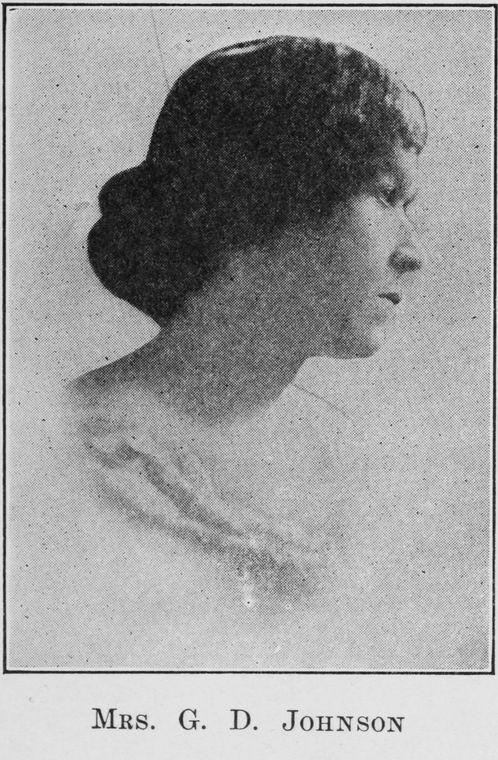
- Georgia Douglas Johnson, 1923
- Original language: African-American Vernacular English
- Written by: Georgia Douglas Johnson
- Characters: Charity Brown Emmerline Brown Tildy Dr. Scott
- Setting: Charity Brown's kitchen in a two-room cottage. There is a window looking out to the street, a door that leads to the street, and another door that leads to the other room. It is dressed with a rocking chair, a cane bottom chair, a stove, a table (with sewing supplies on it), and a wash tub.

Premiere
- Date: 1927
- Place: Chicago's Cube Theatre

Plumes is a one-act, folk drama written by African American playwright Georgia Douglas Johnson in 1927 (first premiered at Chicago's Cube Theatre in the same year). It was played at the Harlem Experimental Theatre between the years of 1928 and 1931. Plumes won first prize in the playwriting contest sponsored by the influential opportunity magazine in 1927. The Play was published in the anthology of African American drama by Alain Locke in 1927 and V.F Calverton's anthology of African American Literature in 1929. This play was written during the Harlem Renaissance, which was a literary movement based around African-American literature and art. The play concerns the worries of an African American woman who lacks the funds to provide healthcare for her daughter or a funeral for her daughters impending death.

== Characters ==
Charity Brown: The Mother of Emmerline Brown, She is living out the "domesticated life of a Black woman" caring for her ill daughter.

Emmerline Brown: The daughter of Charity Brown (this character is only a voice heard from offstage). All the family Charity had left.

Tildy: Charity's friend That helps prepare Emmerline's funeral dress

Dr. Scott: A white physician that suggests that Charity "doesn't love her daughter as much as he thought"

== Plot synopsis ==
Hearing groans from another room, the scene opens to Charity Brown cooking poultice in the kitchen. Charity calls out to her ill daughter to comfort her. Tildy enters the kitchen. They discourse on the hemming of Emmerline’s dress. Tildy offers to help mend it, Charity asks if she can “Whip that torshon and turn down the hem in the skirt”. Charity says this to have the dress cover Emmerline’s

feet. The women then start conversing about making the poultice hotter using red pepper. Another groan is heard and Tildy asks how old Emmerline is. Charity responds by not believing that her daughter will be mended by her fourteenth birthday. After going to check on Emmerline, Charity returns to the kitchen and resumes talking with Tildy. Charity tells Tildy that the last time the doctor visited, he said that Emmerline would need surgery to live. The women do not believe in medical care and are convinced that doctors will only take your money. We find out in this conversation that there were two other children, Little Bessie and Zeke, assumed to be children of Charity, who died and did not receive the extravagant funeral that she had hoped to be able to afford for them. Charity cries reminiscing about their poor funerals but not their actual deaths. Charity then reveals that she washes clothes for a living, earning $1.50, less than what it’s worth, and saving every penny in order to prevent another poor funeral.

After a cup of coffee back in the kitchen, Charity brings up Dinah Morris to read coffee grounds. Tildy suggests that she can try and read Charity’s coffee grounds where she predicts a vision of what is in store for Charity’s future. Tildy stalls because she believes the grounds reveal bad news. Then she bursts out saying she sees a procession for a grand funeral in Charity’s future. They are interrupted by church bells as a funeral parade walks by their house on the way to the grave yard. The funeral is grand and Charity points out the horses, the hearse, the flowers, and the plumes that surely were expensive.

Dr. Scott comes to the house to check on Emmerline. Charity tries to ask to help the doctor but he cuts her off, not allowing Charity to come into the room with him while he checks on Emmerline’s heart and current condition. While he is in there, Charity panics while wondering if he will come back to say that her daughter needs to have surgery, which she cannot afford. To her dismay, the doctor comes back to reveal that the operation is Emmerline’s last chance at survival, and that he will perform the surgery at a discount. Charity hesitates and tells Dr. Scott about the coffee grounds. Dr. Scott is confused and proposes that Charity doesn’t love Emmerline as much as he thought. The doctor exits, allowing Charity to decide whether or not Emmerline should have this operation.

Both women sit in tense silence in the kitchen before hearing a strangling noise coming from Emmerline in the other room. They both rush to her, Tildy carrying the white dress for her before going to get a water pitcher. Before she can exit the kitchen Charity comes back, stops in the doorway and tells Tildy to rip out the hem on the dress.

== Analysis and criticisms ==
Plumes distorts the common rationality of maternal and feminine bonds in 20th-century households. Charity is a single mother who has lost two children previously. Douglas also lacks identifying whether Charity has a husband and depicts a two person household where the mother is the breadwinner. The play specifically relates to the reality of Black womanhood and not ideal maternal bonds. Tildy and Charity's discourse highlights the bond of African American sisterhood. Through the play's dialogue, Johnson underscores the tension between white medicine and authentic black voice through the interactions between Charity and Dr. Scott. Charity and Tildy find validity in reading the coffee grounds, however Dr. Scott projects superstition towards that practice.

The reasons that Charity decided to hesitate to pay for Emmerline's treatment are multifaceted. One reason being her desire for her daughter to escape the tragedies of Black womanhood. Another proposition is the narcissistic tendency for woman to want their children to die.

Criticisms of Plumes root from the nature of Georgia Douglas Johnson's writing technique. W.E.B DuBois describing Douglas as erratic, illogical, and forgetful in his letter of recommendation for her fellowship at The Crisis. Then later characterizing Johnson as capable "to turn out some little thing of unusual value and beauty".

== Publications and inspirations ==
=== Real life inspirations ===
Plumes is based on the diverse personal issues that lay in Georgia Douglas' life, her struggle with being a product of miscegenation and a woman reflected in the anguish depicted in her characters. Suffering is a common theme in plumes and it's reflected in Georgia Douglas's secretiveness about her past that hides her identity similarly to her characters. The fragmented state of charity within plumes reflects the loss of self-identity pushed on by the harsh conditions from Society on women of color.

=== Publications ===
The manuscript of Plumes was sent to W.E.B DuBois by Georgia Douglas Johnson in what is believed to be 1926. In 1927 it was publicized by Opportunity Magazine and Alain Locke's Anthology plays of Negro Life. In 1928 there was an acting edition by Samuel French. In 1929 Plumes was publicized in V.F. Calverton's Anthology of American Literature.
