= Someone at a Distance =

1953 novel

- First edition
- Author: Dorothy Whipple
- Language: English
- Genre: Drama
- Publisher: John Murray
- Publication date: 1953
- Publication place: United Kingdom
- Media type: Print

Someone at a Distance is a 1953 novel by the British writer Dorothy Whipple. A young French woman engaged as companion to an elderly lady ruthlessly sets out to seduce the son of her employer and take him away from his wife. It was the final novel of Whipple who had been a popular writer in the 1930s and 1940s. It was republished in 1999 by Persephone Books. A dramatization was broadcast on BBC Radio Four in 2022.

== Bibliography ==
- Lethbridge, Lucy. Servants: A Downstairs History of Britain from the Nineteenth Century to Modern Times. W. W. Norton & Company, 2013.
- Sponenberg, Ashlie. Encyclopedia of British Women’s Writing 1900–1950. Springer, 2006.
- Turner, Nick. Post-War British Women Novelists and the Canon. Bloomsbury Publishing, 2011.
