= Lewis and Irene =

1924 novel by Paul Morand

- First edition title page
- Author: Paul Morand
- Original title: Lewis et Irène
- Translator: Vyvyan Holland
- Language: French
- Publisher: Éditions Grasset
- Publication date: 1924
- Publication place: France
- English publication date: 1925
- Pages: 361

Lewis and Irene (French: Lewis et Irène) is a 1924 novel by the French writer Paul Morand. It tells the story of the romance between a French financial speculator and a young Greek widow from a family of bankers. The book was published in English in 1925.

== Plot ==
Lewis is a French financial speculator of an adventurous and gambling type. He takes up an option is a sulphur mine on Sicily, but is outmatched by Irene Apostolatos, a young Greek widow who represents the Apostolatos Bank. The two fall in love. They decide to settle down and devote themselves to domestic life, but this turns out to be impossible as they are struck with boredom. Irene returns to the bank in secret. Lewis has an affair, which Irene immediately discovers. The couple break up. Although no longer lovers, Lewis and Irene continue their relationship as business partners.

== Publication ==
The book was originally published in 1924 through éditions Grasset. An English translation by Vyvyan Holland was published in 1925.

== Reception ==
Isabel Paterson wrote in The Bookman: "The titular figures of Paul Morand's Lewis and Irene are symbols rather than types. They resemble the angularized conventions of modern painting, which returns to the archaic in search of novelty." Paterson continued: "Morand strives for detachment, carefully avoids any hint of a moral or a thesis. The sensualist Lewis is just a bundle of appetites and aptitudes without passion or real intelligence; he has the sleek sufficiency of a beast of prey. Irene is merely his opposite. Their behavior has no ethical meaning; it is like a series of chemical reactions. The book is clever, thin, and dry."
