= Open All Night (short story collection) =

1922 short story collection by Paul Morand

- First edition
- Author: Paul Morand
- Original title: Ouvert la nuit
- Language: French
- Publisher: Nouvelle Revue Française
- Publication date: 1922
- Publication place: France
- English publication date: 1923
- Pages: 194

Open All Night (French: Ouvert la nuit) is a 1922 short story collection by the French writer Paul Morand. The book was the basis for a 1924 American film adaptation.

== Contents ==
- Catalan Night (La nuit catalane)
- Turkish Night (La nuit turque)
- Roman Night (La nuit romaine)
- Six-Day Night (La nuit des six jours)
- Hungarian Night (La nuit hongroise)
- Borealis (La nuit nordique)

== Publication ==
Éditions de la Nouvelle Revue Française published the book in France in 1922. It was published in English in 1923, translated by Vyvyan Holland. Ezra Pound also translated the book in the 1920s, but was rejected by the British publisher Chapman and Dodd, which found the stories to be "unsuitable". Pound's translation was rediscovered in the 1970s and published by New Directions Publishing in 1984, in a shared volume with Tender Shoots.

== Adaptation ==
The book was the basis for the American silent film Open All Night, directed by Paul Bern. The film premiered on 13 October 1924.
