= Black Magic (book) =

1928 book by Paul Morand

- UK 1929 edition (publ. William Heinemann)
- Author: Paul Morand
- Original title: Magie noire
- Translator: Hamish Miles
- Language: French
- Publisher: Éditions Grasset
- Publication date: 1928
- Publication place: France
- English publication date: 1929
- Pages: 303

Black Magic (French: Magie noire) is a 1928 book by the French writer Paul Morand. It focuses on Morand's travels in Sub-Saharan Africa and his encounters with African cultures, which he admires. The book was published in English in 1929, translated by Hamish Miles and with illustrations by Aaron Douglas.

== Reception ==
The book was reviewed in The Outlook by Lucille Fort Hewlings who compared it to André Gide's Travels in the Congo, which was published in English around the same time. Hewlings wrote: "If two Frenchmen had not happened to publish books about the negro at the same time, no one would have been so hard-hearted as to have subjected the work of Paul Morand (discussed below) to the ordeal of comparison with that of André Gide. But it happens that nothing could illustrate better than do these two books the difference between the attitude toward the negro of the versatile, up-to-the-minute but neither before nor after it journalistic mind (Morand) and the philosophical, highly cultured mind (Gide). Both men are negrophiles. But Morand is the raucous emotional follower of the Harlem cult; Gide, the intelligent critic of primitive culture, the temperate admirer of primitive virtues." Hewlings continued: "Black Magic will be interesting to readers of Bruno Frank's brilliant The Persians Are Coming, for Morand presents in Congo an example of the African out of America whose primitive appeal to anemic Europe is breaking down its civilization. This theory is further upheld by the drawings of Aaron Douglas when he gives us those pale shadowy figures dancing before a symbolic background. Pale arms raised in supplication to an African god that magnetizes decadent Europe after the scourge of war. Aaron Douglas knows his own people and his drawings are in sharp contrast to the deliberate violence of Morand's prose."
