= Dorothy Whipple =

English novelist and children's writer (1893–1966)

- Born: Dorothy Stirrup; 26 February 1893; Blackburn, Lancashire, England
- Died: 14 September 1966 (aged 73); Blackburn, Lancashire, England
- Occupation: Writer
- Spouse: Henry Whipple (m. 1917; died 1958)
- Writing career
- Period: 20th century
- Genre: Popular fiction

Dorothy Whipple (née Stirrup; 26 February 1893 – 14 September 1966) was an English novelist of popular fiction and children's books. Her work gained popularity between the world wars and again in the 2000s.

== Early life and family ==
Whipple was born 26 February 1893 in Blackburn, Lancashire to Walter Stirrup (1865–1955), an architect and land agent, and Ada Stirrup (née Cunliffe; 1868–1942). The second of eight children, two of her siblings died during childhood. Educated at Miss Barrett's School, Stirrup attended Blackburn high school from 1903 to 1905. Later attending the convent of Notre Dame from 1905 to 1911, she subsequently spent a year at a convent in Sens, France.

Returning to England in 1912, Stirrup began working as the secretary to the director of education for Blackburn. Her close friend George Owen was killed in the first week of the First World War. She worked for three years as a secretary to Henry Whipple, a widowed educational administrator 24 years her senior, and married him in 1917. Their life together was mostly spent in Nottingham. She returned to Blackburn after his death in 1958 and died there in 1966.

== Career ==
Described as the "Jane Austen of the 20th Century" by J. B. Priestley, her work enjoyed a period of great popularity between the wars, two of her novels being made into feature films, They Were Sisters (1945) and They Knew Mr. Knight (1946). Additionally, her 1946 novella Every Good Deed was the initial basis for One Good Turn (1955) starring Norman Wisdom, and her 1949 novel Because of the Lockwoods was adapted later that year for an eponymous episode of The Philco Television Playhouse.

Her novels were inspired by the places and people around her. Young Anne (1927), High Wages (1930), Greenbanks (1932), and Because of the Lockwoods (1949) are all set in fictional or real northern industrial towns in Lancashire. Her characters experience the cobbled streets, the town centre of small shops and businesses, and the class-differentiated housing that would have been familiar to residents of such places in the interwar years.

While the popularity of Whipple's work declined in the 1950s, it revived in the 2000s, when six novels were republished by Persephone Books. A volume of her collected short stories appeared in October 2007. Five of these were broadcast as The Afternoon Reading on BBC Radio 4. By April 2019, ten of the 132 books published by Persephone Books were written by Whipple.

== Bibliography ==
- Young Anne (1927), republished 2018
- High Wages (1930), republished 2009
- Greenbanks (1932), republished 2011
- They Knew Mr. Knight (1934), republished 2000
- On Approval (1935)
- The Other Day: An Autobiography (1936), republished 2022
- The Priory (1939), republished 2003
- After Tea, and Other Stories (1942)
- They Were Sisters (1943), republished 2005
- Every Good Deed (1946), republished 2016
- Because of the Lockwoods (1949), republished 2014
- Someone at a Distance (1953), republished 1999
- Wednesday and Other Stories (1961)
- Tale of Very Little Tortoise (1962)
- The Smallest Tortoise of All (1964)
- Little Hedgehog (1965)
- Random Commentary: Books And Journals Kept from 1925 Onwards (1966), republished 2020
- Mrs. Puss and That Kitten (1967)
- The Closed Door and Other Stories (2007)
