= The Man in a Hurry =

1941 novel by Paul Morand

- 1st English edition
- Author: Paul Morand
- Original title: L'Homme pressé
- Translator: Euan Cameron
- Language: French
- Publisher: Éditions Gallimard
- Publication date: 3 September 1941
- Publication place: France
- English publication date: 12 February 2015
- Pages: 332

The Man in a Hurry (French: L'Homme pressé) is a 1941 novel by the French writer Paul Morand. It tells the story of a busy Paris antiques dealer who does not seem to be able to relax and settle down, not even when he finally becomes enamoured, gets married and has a child. According to Morand, the main character is largely autobiographical. An English translation by Euan Cameron was published by Pushkin Press in 2015.

== Reception ==
Bill Spence of The Press wrote in 2015: "This novel is a joy to read and has been superbly translated for the first time in English. Euan Cameron brings out the true flavour of French literature. It is an unusual, witty book that is so apt for our way of life in a technological age." Kirkus Reviews stated the same year: "The translation's prose is refined and worldly, the atmosphere European, the overall effect that of a jeu d'esprit. Where the book rises above that is in the depiction of the minimatriarchy Pierre marries into. The four women's curious behavior recalls moments in Mervyn Peake's Gormenghast novels and Eugenides' Virgin Suicides."

== Movie adaptations ==
The book has been the basis of two movie adaptations. Édouard Molinaro's The Hurried Man, featuring Alain Delon, premiered in 1977. It recorded admissions of 730,581 in France.

A television movie directed by Sébastien Grall, also titled The Hurried Man, was released in 2005.
