= Bata LoBagola =

American entertainer

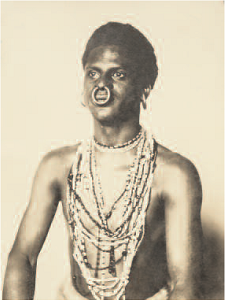
LoBagola in 1911

Bata Kindai Amgoza ibn LoBagola (1877–1947) was an early 20th-century American impostor and entertainer who presented an exoticized identity as a native of Africa, when in reality he was born Joseph Howard Lee in Baltimore, Maryland. Despite an impoverished start in life and a lack of education, and a series of scandalous arrests related to homosexual activities, mainly involving underage individuals, LoBagola maintained a long and colorful career posing as an African "savage", during which he delivered lectures to many institutions and conducted public debates.

== LoBagola; an African Savage's Own Story ==
LoBagola published some articles in Scribner's Magazine in 1929 and the publishers A.A. Knopf decided to produce a book version to be titled LoBagola; an African Savage's Own Story, in an attempt to capitalise upon the then-current vogue for "exotic customs" of "places untouched by Europe". Knopf made much of LoBagola being a "savage" from a region of Africa supposedly never visited by white people, though LoBagola described himself as a "Black Jew", claiming that he was descended from people who had fled the Holy Land following the destruction of Herod's Temple.

The book was virtually unedited and came across as a picaresque pseudo-biography, studded with LoBagola's observations of "West African" ways and his adventures in many lands.

== Death ==
LoBagola died in Attica Prison in 1947, with eighteen months of his current sentence remaining, of a pulmonary edema. He was buried in the prison cemetery.

== Popular culture ==
LoBagola was the subject of a 2016 episode of the Futility Closet Podcast.
