= They Knew Mr. Knight (film) =

- British quad poster
- Directed by: Norman Walker
- Written by: Victor MacLure; Norman Walker
- Based on: They Knew Mr. Knight by Dorothy Whipple
- Produced by: Norman Walker
- Starring: Mervyn Johns; Nora Swinburne; Joyce Howard; Joan Greenwood
- Cinematography: Erwin Hillier
- Edited by: Sam Simmonds
- Music by: John Greenwood
- Production company: G.H.W. Productions
- Distributed by: General Film Distributors
- Release date: 4 March 1946
- Running time: 93 minutes
- Country: United Kingdom
- Language: English

They Knew Mr. Knight is a 1946 British drama film directed by Norman Walker and starring Mervyn Johns, Nora Swinburne and Joyce Howard. It was written by Victor McLure and Walker based on a 1934 novel of the same title by Dorothy Whipple.

== Plot ==
A man is sentenced to twelve months in Lincoln jail following his involvement in a share scam, plunging himself and his family into despair. However, by the time of his release he is able to face his uncertain future with fortitude.

== Cast ==
- Mervyn Johns as Tom Blake
- Nora Swinburne as Celia Blake
- Joyce Howard as Freda Blake
- Joan Greenwood as Ruth Blake
- Peter Hammond as Douglas Blake
- Marie Ault as Grandma Blake
- Frederick Cooper as Edward Blake
- Grace Arnold as Isabel Blake
- Alfred Drayton as Mr. Knight
- Olive Sloane as Mrs. Knight
- Joan Maude as Carrie Porritt
- Kenneth Kove as Coggie Selby
- Frederick Burtwell as Mr. Berry
- Winifred Oughton as Mrs. Greene
- Tarva Penna as Mr. Greene
- Patric Curwen as Mr. Porter
- Muriel Aked as Lady Gilling
- Anthony Holles as station master
- Gordon Begg as Sims
- Ian Fleming as Higgs
- Sheila Raynor as Agnes
- Pat Stevens as Miss Berry
- Doyley John as Bobby Hewett
- Alan Snart as choirboy

== Production ==
The film was made by Norman Walker's G.H.W. Productions, funded by the Rank Organisation, at Denham Studios. It suffered a financial loss on its release and it was the last of four films that Walker made for Rank.

== Critical reception ==
The Monthly Film Bulletin wrote: "It has the elements of a good story and is made with all the uncompromising realism and meticulous attention to detail of which British studios are justly proud. Yet with all these virtues it somehow falls flat, because it lacks the imaginative direction which would penetrate through the drab surface to the human or social significance underneath. A theme of lower middle-class life, with neither the glamour of luxury nor the dramatic grimness of low life, needs, more than any other, inspired treatment, imaginative characterisation, and probably just a touch of affectionate satire. They Knew My. Knight presents an admirably correct picture of very ordinary people, but nothing more; and as a result it is moving but just a little dull. Nevertheless it is quite a good film, well acted by Mervyn Johns as Blake, Nora Swinburne as Mrs. Blake, and Alfred Drayton as the crook-financier. It contains some good scenes, such as the inevitable Sunday walk through dreary suburbs to visit Blake's disgruntled old mother, and, on the whole, it is worth a good many slicker but less honest productions."

Kine Weekly wrote: "Elaborately mounted, but rather laboured domestic-cum-financial melodrama, illustrates the text 'For what shall it profit a man, if he shall gain the whole world, and lose his own soul?' ... First-class performances are given by Alfred Drayton as the unprincipled sharepusher, and Nora Swinburne, as the victim's loyal and tender wife, and a number of bright and poignant domestic touches, but fhe salient features are too obvious and the financial details of the undertaking too vague to impart conviction, let alone deliver a message. Its main hope is its feminine appeal."

Picturegoer wrote: "Mervyn Johns does his best to make the role of an unassuming married man who is made and broken by a crooked pioneer convincing, but he does not wholly succeed. The story has its moments of pathos, but it always smacks strongly of the theatre."

Picture Show wrote: "Sincere, but a little dull and depressing."

Variety wrote: "Mervyn Johns, Alfred Drayton, Nora Swinburne, Joyce Howard and Joan Greenwood all have a certain amount of pull with British audiences, but their best friends will steer clear of watching them struggle through this impossible story. Dorothy Whipple's novel of the same title may be enjoyable reading, but the screen adaptation makes it doubtful. To blame either Norman Walker, director, or the cast would be unfair. The scenario offers little either for cast or director."

The Radio Times gave the film two out of five stars, and wrote, "director Norman Walker rather wallows in this glum middle-class morality tale. But he prudently cashes in on Johns's fretful features and the solid support provided by Nora Swinburne and Joan Greenwood, as his wife and self-sacrificing daughter."
