= High Wages =

1930 novel

- First edition
- Author: Dorothy Whipple
- Language: English
- Genre: Drama
- Publisher: John Murray
- Publication date: 1930
- Publication place: United Kingdom
- Media type: Print

High Wages is a 1930 novel by British writer Dorothy Whipple. One of her first novels, it follows a young woman who rises from being a worker in a dress shop to owning her own business in the years following the First World War. The novel was an instant commercial success and established Whipple as a popular writer over the next two decades. As part of a revival of interest in her work, it was republished by Persephone Books in 2009.

== Bibliography ==
- Boyiopoulos, Kostas, Patterson, Anthony and Sandy, Mark (ed.) Literary and Cultural Alternatives to Modernism: Unsettling Presences. Routledge, 2019.
- Plock, Vike Martina. Modernism, Fashion and Interwar Women Writers. Edinburgh University Press, 2017.
- Sponenberg, Ashlie. Encyclopedia of British Women’s Writing 1900–1950. Springer, 2006.
