= Tender Shoots =

1921 short story collection by Paul Morand

- First edition
- Author: Paul Morand
- Original title: Tendres stocks
- Language: French
- Publisher: Nouvelle Revue Française
- Publication date: 1921
- Publication place: France
- English publication date: 1924
- Pages: 153

Tender Shoots (French: Tendres stocks) is a 1921 short story collection by the French writer Paul Morand. It has also been published in English as Green Shoots and Fancy Goods. It consists of three stories about independent young women. The stories are mainly set in London, where Morand had worked as a diplomat for the Embassy of France. Morand wrote the stories right before and during the first few months of World War I. The preface was written by Marcel Proust.

== Contents ==
- "Clarisse"
- "Delphine"
- "Aurore"

== Publication ==
The book was published in 1921 through Nouvelle Revue Française, with a preface by Marcel Proust. The first edition consisted of 1060 copies. It was published in English in 1924 as Green Shoots, translated by H. I. Woolf. Ezra Pound had previously made a rejected translation, which was rediscovered in the 1970s and published in 1984 as Fancy Goods. A new translation by Euan Cameron was published in 2011.

== Reception ==
Ian Thomson of The Guardian wrote in 2012: "Morand's glancing, aphoristic prose – praised by Jean Cocteau and the surrealist André Breton – is often striking. ... For all his flights of purple prose and occasional snobbishness, his London stories are suffused with dark emotions of love, jealousy and regret. Exquisitely translated by Euan Cameron, Tender Shoots remains a work of haunting, elegiac strangeness."
