= The Mouthpiece (play) =

1930 play

- Original language: English
- Written by: Edgar Wallace
- Genre: Crime

Premiere
- Date: 20 November 1930
- Place: Wyndham's Theatre, London

The Mouthpiece is a 1930 crime play by the British writer Edgar Wallace. It was one of several theatrical failures written by Wallace following the enormous success of On the Spot, with a plot described as "flimsy".

It ran for twelve performances at Wyndham's Theatre in the West End. The cast included Emlyn Williams, Douglas Payne, Mabel Terry-Lewis and Margaret Bannerman. In 1935 it was posthumously novelised by Robert Curtis.

A gang of criminals discover that a young woman is unaware that she is about to inherit a fortune, and scheme to marry one of their members to her to get their hands on the money.

== Bibliography ==
- Kabatchnik, Amnon. Blood on the Stage, 1975-2000: Milestone Plays of Crime, Mystery, and Detection : an Annotated Repertoire. Rowman & Littlefield, 2012.
- Wearing, J. P. The London Stage 1930–1939: A Calendar of Productions, Performers, and Personnel. Rowman & Littlefield, 2014.
