= E. H. Young =

English novelist and mountaineer (1880–1949)

Emily Hilda Daniell, born Emily Hilda Young (21 March 1880 – 8 August 1949) was an English novelist, children's writer and mountaineer, writing as E. H. Young. She supported the women's suffrage movement.

== Life ==
Emily Young was born in Whitley Bay, Northumberland, to Frances Jane Young and William Michael Young, a shipbroker. Her sister, Gladys Young, became an actress. Young attended Gateshead Secondary School and later Penrhos College, Colwyn Bay.

In 1902, at the age of 22, Young married John Arthur Helton Daniell, a Bristol solicitor, and moved with him to the fashionable neighbourhood of Clifton, Bristol. There she developed an interest in classical and modern philosophy, became a supporter of the women's suffrage movement and started writing novels. She also began a lifelong affair with Ralph Henderson, a schoolteacher and friend of her husband.

In 1914, at the outset of the First World War, Young went to work first as a stable groom and then in a munitions factory. Her husband, a sergeant in the Royal Garrison Artillery, was killed on 1 July 1917 during preparations for the Third Battle of Ypres. The following year she moved to 87a Sydenham Hill, London, to form a ménage à trois with her lover, by then headmaster of Alleyn's public school, and his wife. Young became the school librarian and occupied a flat in the Hendersons' house. She was addressed as "Mrs Daniell" to conceal their unconventional arrangement.

This change seems to have been the catalyst she needed. Seven novels followed, all set in Clifton, thinly disguised as "Upper Radstowe". The first was The Misses Mallett, published originally as The Bridge Dividing in 1922. Her 1930 novel Miss Mole won the James Tait Black Award for fiction. In the 1940s, Young also wrote books for children: Caravan Island (1940) and River Holiday (1942).

In retirement, Henderson separated from his wife and Young moved with him to Bradford on Avon in Wiltshire. They never married. During the Second World War, she worked actively on air-raid precautions. They continued to live in Wiltshire until her death from lung cancer in 1949.

== Mountaineering ==
Young and Henderson shared a love of mountaineering, in which she and her sister Gladys had become enthusiastic in adolescence. In 1911 Young became an early member of the Fell & Rock Climbing Club, based in the English Lake District, although it was in Welsh Snowdonia that she climbed most frequently.

On 14 August 1915, she led Henderson, Ivor Richards and James Roxborough on a pioneering route up the Idwal Slabs. Previously thought impregnable by experienced climbers such as O. G. Jones, Henderson later testified to her "remarkable qualities of balance, speed, and leadership, and to her sound judgment of rock and route". Originally christened "Minerva" in honour of feminine endeavour, the route is now better known as "Hope".

Young was a founder member of the women's Pinnacle Club in 1921. However, she climbed less frequently as her literary career flourished.

== Legacy ==
Popular in its time, Young's work is occasionally read today. In 1927 Young's publisher, Harcourt, Brace & Co, announced a fifth printing of her 1925 novel William. A decade later the novel was chosen one of the first ten Penguin paperbacks by Allen Lane, issued in July 1935. In 1941 the Reader's Club, a new "literary guild" that sought to revive overlooked books, made Young's William their first selection.

In 1980, a four-part series based on her novels – mainly Miss Mole – was shown on BBC television as Hannah. The feminist publishers Virago reprinted several of her books in the 1980s. Her final novel, Chatterton Square (1947) which tackled the divorce laws by exploring the options open to the mid-century woman - unmarried, separated, miserably married - was re-issued in 2020.

The Clifton and Hotwells Improvement Society has marked her Clifton home with a plaque.

The E. H. Young Prize for Greek Thought was an annual essay prize awarded in her memory at Bristol Grammar School.

== Bibliography ==
Fiction:

- A Corn of Wheat (1910)
- Yonder (1912)
- Moor Fires (1916)
- A Bridge Dividing (1922) (republished as The Misses Mallett)
- William (1925)
- The Vicar's Daughter (1928)
- Miss Mole (1930)
- Jenny Wren (1932)
- The Curate's Wife (1934)
- Celia (1937)
- Chatterton Square (1947)

Children's fiction:

- Caravan Island (1940)
- River Holiday (1942)
