= Peter Trower =

Canadian poet and novelist (1930–2017)

Peter Gerard Trower (25 August 1930 – 10 November 2017) was a Canadian poet and novelist.

Trower was born in St Leonards-on-Sea, England, and came to Canada in 1940. He worked for 22 years as a logger and has been writing professionally since 1971.

Trower published three novels, more than ten books of poetry and numerous articles. One of his novels, Grogan's Cafe (novel), is in pre-production for a film

In 1976, Trower was the subject of a CBC documentary titled Between the Sky and the Splinters, after his 1974 book of poetry of the same name.

== Bibliography ==
=== Poetry ===
- Moving Through the Mystery - Talonbooks - 1969
- Between the Sky and the Splinters - Harbour - 1974
- The Alders and Others - Harbour - 1976
- Ragged Horizons - McClelland & Stewart - 1978
- Bush Poems - Harbour - 1978
- Goose quill Snags - Harbour - 1982
- The Slidingback Hills - Oberon - 1986
- Unmarked Doorways - Harbour - 1989
- Where Roads Lead - Reference West - 1994
- Hitting the Bricks - Ekstasis - 1997
- Chainsaws in the Cathedral - Ekstasis - 1999
- A Ship Called Destiny - Ekstasis - 2000
- There Are Many Ways - Ekstasis - 2002
- Haunted Hills and Hanging Valleys: Selected Poems 1969-2004 - Harbour - 2004

=== Prose ===
- Rough and Ready Times - Glassford - 1993
- Grogan's Cafe - Harbour - 1993
- Dead Man's Ticket - Harbour - 1996
- The Judas Hills - Harbour - 2000
- Hellhound on his Trail & other stories - Ekstasis - 2008

== Editor ==
- Witches and Idiots
- Raincoast Chronicles

== Anthology contributions ==
- Best Poems - 1967
- West Coast Seen
- Kites and Cartwheels
- Listen
- Skookum Wa Wa
- Storm Warning 2
- Raincoast Chronicles First Five
- A Government Job at Last
- Western Windows
- Who Owns the Earth
- Assault on the Worker
- Poems for a Snow-eyed Country
- For Openers
- Going for Coffee
- Raincoast Chronicles Six/Ten
- British Columbia/A Celebration
- Soul of a City
- Vancouver Poetry
- Vancouver and its Writers
- Strong Voices
- Paperwork
- Oberon Poetry
- Vancouver
- Songs from the Wild
- Because You Loved Being a Stranger
- Witness to Wilderness
- Raincoast Chronicles Eleven Up
- Earle Birney - A Tribute

== Periodical contributions ==
- Poetry (Chicago)
- Poetry Australia
- Prism International
- West Coast Review
- This Magazine
- Canadian Poetry Magazine
- Vancouver Magazine
- West World
- Equity
- Western Living
- Raincoast Chronicles
- The Georgia Straight
- Sunshine Coast News
- Business Logger
- B. C. Studies

== Discography ==
- Sidewalks & Sidehills - 2003
- Kisses In the Whiskey - 2004

== Projects in Progress ==
- Way Stations (Selected Prose)
- The Counting House (Short stories centered on Oakalla Prison)
- Holy Herb - Master Cracksman (Semi-fictionalized biography)
- Rainbow's End Horizons (Travel pieces)
- Booking In (Selected book and film reviews)
- Reluctant Brush Ape (Autobiographical logging pieces)
- The Gathering (Poems new, revised and uncollected)
