= Blue-Eyed Black Boy =

One-act play by George Douglas Johnson

- Written by: Georgia Douglas Johnson
- Characters: Pauline Waters, Rebecca Waters, Dr. Thomas Grey, Hester Grant
- Setting: Rural

Blue-Eyed Black Boy is a 1930 one-act play by Georgia Douglas Johnson, one of the earliest African-American playwrights and an American poet that was a member of the Harlem Renaissance.

== Characters ==
- Pauline Waters, mother
- Rebecca Waters, daughter
- Dr. Thomas Grey, fiancé of Rebecca
- Hester Grant, Pauline's best friend

== Plot overview ==
The play opens in the kitchen of Mrs. (Pauline) Water's kitchen, as she sits in a large rocking chair with her foot on a low stool, bandaged. Her daughter, Rebecca Waters, comes out to show her mother her wedding dress that she is working on. She is engaged to be married to Thomas Grey, a doctor who happens to be the one tending to Pauline's injured foot. Rebecca's father is revealed to have died some time ago.

They are waiting for Pauline's son Jack who is just over an hour late to be home from work. They talk about how he is known as “the smartest and finest looking black boy in the whole town.” They discuss how he is the only one in the family with blue eyes, while everyone else has black eyes. Rebecca claims she wishes she had his eyes too, and Pauline discourages her from ignoring her own beauty. They make fun of how dedicated and hard working Jack is, saying instead of chasing girls he is more interested in his books.

Dr. Thomas Grey enters and greets Pauline before changing her bandages. He reveals that she stepped on a rusty nail, and should refrain from walking on it for another week. He mentions there was some “rough looking hoodlums gathering on the streets” as he came in. Rebecca assures him, “they’re always having squabble on these streets” and that he will get used to it.

Pauline keeps complaining about her foot pain, when Hester Grant runs in panting. She addresses Pauline to tell her that Jack has been arrested for brushing up against a white woman on the street, followed by the woman claiming he was trying to attack her. White men came up and started beating him, and then policemen dragged him to the jail. Hester warns Pauline they want to lynch him. Dr. Grey offers to run over to the judge to speak with him but Hester points out that he's “a lyncher his own self” and not to trust him.

Pauline quickly thinks of an idea and is not going to let her son be lynched. She yells to Rebecca to get a little tin box out of her trunk and bring it to her. Once she does, Pauline pulls out a small ring and gives it to Dr. Grey. She tells him to jump on his horse and buggy and get over to Governor Tinkham's house, give him the ring, and say exactly that it is sent from Pauline, and that they are about to lynch her son born 21 years ago. He leaves while there is a lot of commotion outside.

Hester and Rebecca tremble in their voices hoping he gets to the governor to save Jack in time. Pauline says to trust in God and trust in the governor, and she breaks out in prayer. During the prayer she slips that the governor is Jack's father, but Rebecca and Hester don't seem to hear. They begin getting more nervous and Pauline sobs. Then they hear “many feet” outside and see that the state troops are coming, and Dr. Grey is back. He delivers the news that he is saved and that the Governor sent the troops.

== Themes ==
- Racism
- Black struggles
- Impunity of violence/hate
- Grief,
- Interracial relationships
- Corruption in government
- Inequality.

== Production history ==
There have been no known productions of Blue-Eyed Black Boy.

== Johnson, Georgia Blanche Douglas Camp (1886-1966) ==
Georgia Blanche Douglas (Camp) Johnson was known to have been born September 10, 1886 (though it is unsure the actual date, this one is the most often claimed) in Atlanta, Georgia. She died in 1966 in the District of Columbia, USA. Born and raised American, Johnson was a teacher, writer, and social reformer. She worked to reform the oppression of Black people such as herself. She was college educated at Atlanta University in Georgia USA, Howard University in Washington DC, and Oberlin College in Oberlin, Ohio.

Johnson's mother was Laura Jackson, a woman with Black and Indian ancestry, and her father was George Camp, a wealthy Englishman. Little is known about her family, as her mother worked often and she wasn't known to have known much about her father, though she had three brothers and a sister through her mother's third marriage. She married Henry "Link" Johnson, the son of ex-slaves in 1903 and a very educated man. He died of a cerebral hemorrhage in 1925 leaving Georgia with two teenage sons, Henry Lincoln, Jr. and Peter Douglas.

Most known for her poetry and Drama, Johnson also happened to be a journalist who contributed to 32 newspapers, publishing weekly editorials. Johnson is considered the most prolific playwright of lynching drama.

She published four books of poetry: The Heart of a Woman (1918), Bronze (1922), An Autumn Love Cycle (1928), Share My World (1962). She expressed the oppression of African Americans often, such as in the poem "The Passing of the Ex-Slave". Though she has many thematic principles in her works, she actively wrote about lynching and miscegenation. In addition to exposing problems with racism, she also focused a lot on the life of a woman in general, and at times more specifically, the life of a Black woman.

She published several one act plays, including A Summer Morning in the South, (1924) Plumes, (1927) Frederick Douglass, (1935) William and Ellen Craft, (1935) Blue Blood, (1926) and Blue-Eyed Black Boy, (1935).

Being particularly difficult to be heard as a Black female writer, Johnson has written at least two short stories under the pseudonym, Paul Tremaine.

Today, Johnson's work is not as commonly known. It could be due to the absence of her work in literary anthologies and inaccessibility of her books which were out of print until 1971 when they were added to The Black Heritage Library Collection.
