= They Knew Mr. Knight (novel) =

1934 novel

- Author: Dorothy Whipple
- Language: English
- Genre: Melodrama
- Publisher: Farrar & Rinehart
- Publication date: 1934
- Media type: Print
- ISBN: 9781903155080 (republished: Persephone Books, 2000)

They Knew Mr. Knight is a 1934 dramatic novel by the British writer Dorothy Whipple.

== Synopsis ==
Tom Blake, a factory worker, becomes involved with a shady financier known as Mr. Knight. Guided by Knight, Blake becomes involved in series of bad investments and fraud. He is arrested and sent to jail. On his release, Blake has to come to terms with the difficult prospect of reintegrating into society.

== Critical reception ==
The Times Literary Supplement wrote, "the portraits in the book are fired by Mrs Whipple's article of faith – the supreme importance of people"; while The Sunday Telegraph called the novel a "real treat."

== Adaptation ==
The novel was adapted into a 1946 film of the same title directed by Norman Walker and starring Mervyn Johns, Joan Greenwood and Alfred Drayton.

== Bibliography ==
- Murphy, Robert. Realism and Tinsel: Cinema and Society in Britain 1939-48. Routledge, 1992.
