= Georgia Douglas Johnson =

American poet and playwright (1880–1966)

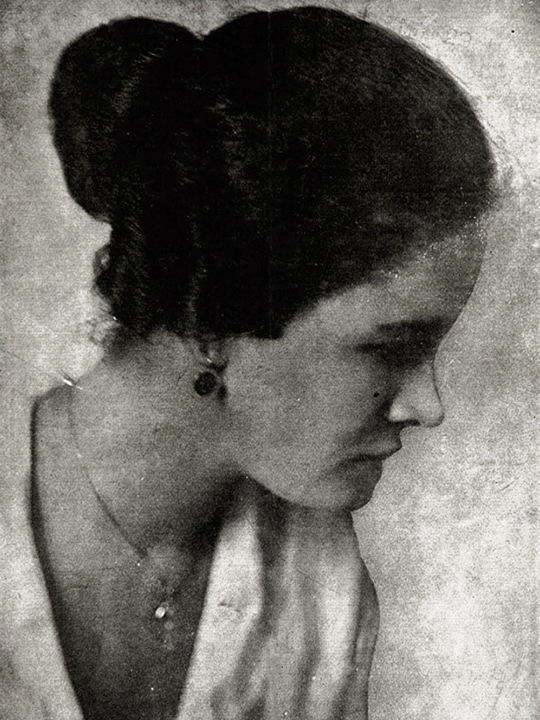
- Johnson in 1920
- Born: September 10, 1880; Atlanta, Georgia, U.S.
- Died: May 15, 1966 (aged 85); Washington, D.C., U.S.
- Education: Atlanta University's Normal School
- Alma mater: Oberlin Conservatory of Music
- Occupations: Poet; one of the earliest African-American female playwrights; music teacher; school principal
- Spouse: Henry Lincoln Johnson
- Children: Two sons
- Relatives: Parents, Laura Douglas and George Camp
- Writing career
- Movements: Harlem Renaissance, anti-lynching movement, S Street Salon

Georgia Blanche Douglas Camp Johnson, better known as Georgia Douglas Johnson (September 10, 1880 – May 15, 1966), was an American poet and playwright. She was one of the earliest female African-American playwrights, and an important figure of the Harlem Renaissance.

== Early life ==
She was born as Georgia Blanche Douglas Camp in 1880 in Atlanta, Georgia, to Laura Douglas and George Camp (her mother's last name is listed in other sources as Jackson). Both parents were of mixed ancestry, with her mother having African-American and Native American heritage, and her father of African-American and English heritage.

Camp lived for much of her childhood in Rome, Georgia. She received her education in both Rome and Atlanta, where she excelled in reading, recitations and physical education. She also taught herself to play the violin. She developed a lifelong love of music that she expressed in her plays, which make distinct use of sacred music.

She graduated from Atlanta University's Normal School in 1896. She taught school in Marietta, Georgia. In 1902 she left her teaching career to pursue her interest in music, attending Oberlin Conservatory of Music in Ohio. She wrote music from 1898 until 1959. After studying in Oberlin, Johnson returned to Atlanta, where she became assistant principal in a public school.

== Marriage and family ==
On September 28, 1903, Douglas married Henry Lincoln Johnson (1870–1925), an Atlanta lawyer and prominent Republican party member who was ten years older than her. Douglas and Johnson had two sons: Henry Lincoln Johnson, Jr., and Peter Douglas Johnson (d. 1957). In 1910, they moved to Washington, DC, as her husband had been appointed as Recorder of Deeds for the District of Columbia, a political patronage position under Republican President William Howard Taft. While the city had an active cultural life among the elite people of color, it was far from the Harlem literary center of New York, to which Douglas became attracted.

Douglas' marital life was affected by her writing ambition, for her husband was not supportive of her literary passion, insisting that she devote more time to becoming a homemaker than on publishing poetry. She later dedicated two poems to him, "The Heart of a Woman" (1918) and "Bronze" (1922), which were praised for their literary quality.

== Career ==
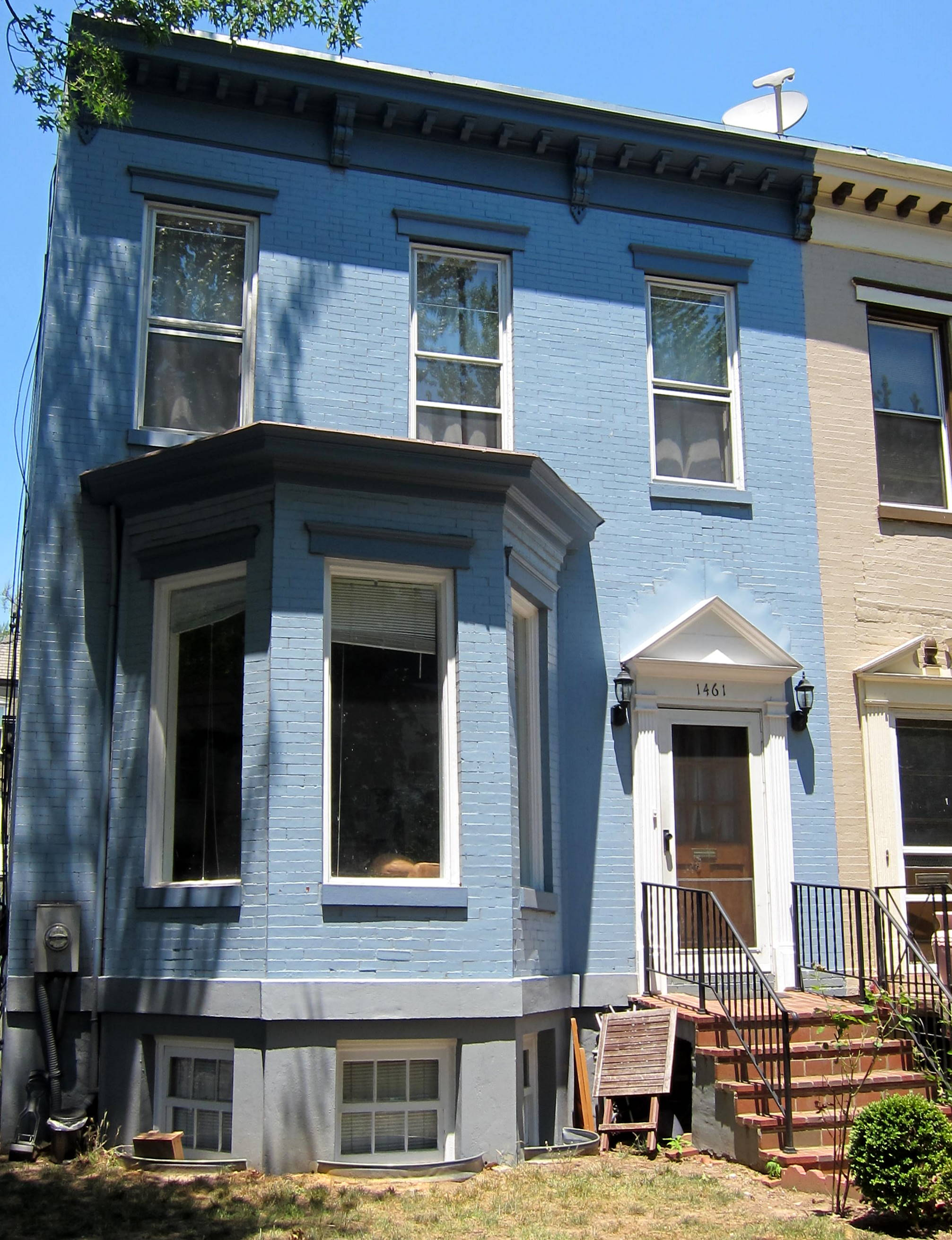
The former Washington, D.C., residence of Georgia Douglas Johnson and site of the S Street Salon, an important literary salon of the Harlem Renaissance

After the Johnson family moved to Washington, D.C., in 1910, Douglas Johnson began to write poems and stories. She credited a poem written by William Stanley Braithwaite, about a rose tended by a child, as her inspiration for writing poetry. Johnson also wrote songs, plays, short stories, taught music, and performed as an organist at her Congregational church.

=== Poetry ===
She had already begun to submit poems to newspapers and small magazines when she lived in Atlanta. Her first poem was published in 1905 in the literary journal The Voice of the Negro. Her first collection of poems was not published until 1916.

Johnson published a total of four volumes of poetry, beginning in 1916 with The Heart of a Woman. In the 21st century, her poems have been described as feminine and "ladylike", or "raceless". They have titles such a "Faith", "Youth", and "Joy".

Her poems were published in several issues of The Crisis, the journal of the NAACP that was founded and edited by W. E. B. Du Bois. "Calling Dreams" was published in January 1920, "Treasure" in July 1922, and "To Your Eyes" in November 1924.

During the 1920s, Douglas Johnson traveled extensively to give poetry readings. In 1925, her husband died, and she was widowed at the age of 45. She had to rear their two teenage sons by herself. For years she struggled to support them financially, sometimes taking the clerical jobs generally available to women.

But as a gesture to her late husband's loyalty and political service, Republican President Calvin Coolidge appointed Douglas Johnson as the Commissioner of Conciliation, a political appointee position within the Department of Labor. In 1934, during the Democratic administration of Franklin D. Roosevelt, she lost this political appointee job. She returned to supporting herself with temporary clerical work.

Johnson's literary success resulted in her becoming the first African-American woman to get national notice for her poetry since Frances Ellen Watkins Harper. In 1962 she published her last poetry collection, Share My World.

==== The Heart of a Woman ====
Johnson was well recognized for her poems collected in The Heart of a Woman (1918). She explores themes for women such as isolation, loneliness, pain, love and the role of being a woman during this time. Other poems in this collection consist of motherly concerns.

"The Heart of a Woman"

The heart of a woman goes forth with the dawn,
As a lone bird, soft winging, so restlessly on,
Afar o'er life's turrets and vales does it roam
In the wake of those echoes, the heart calls home.
The heart of a woman falls back with the night,
And enters some alien cage in its plight,
And tries to forget it has dreamed of the stars
While it breaks, breaks, breaks on the sheltering bars.

==== Bronze ====
Johnson's collection published as Bronze had a popular theme of racial issues; she continued to explore motherhood and being a woman of color. In the foreword of Bronze she said: "Those who know what it means to be a colored woman in 1922– know it not so much in fact as in feeling ..."[1]

"Calling Dreams"

The right to make my dreams come true,
I ask, nay, I demand of life;
Nor shall fate's deadly contraband
Impede my steps, nor countermand;
Too long my heart against the ground
Has beat the dusty years around;
And now at length I rise! I wake!
And stride into the morning break!

=== Plays ===
Johnson was a well-known figure in the national black theatre movement and was an important "cultural sponsor" in the early twentieth century, assembling and inspiring the intellectuals and artists who generated the next group of black theatre and rising education (16). Johnson wrote about 28 plays. Plumes was published under the pen name John Temple. Many of her plays were never published because of her gender and race. Gloria Hull is credited with the rediscovery of many of Johnson's plays. The 28 plays that she wrote were divided into four groups: "Primitive Life Plays", "Plays of Average Negro Life", "Lynching Plays" and "Radio Plays". The first section, "Primitive Life Plays", features Blue Blood and Plumes, which were published and produced during Johnson's lifetime.

Like several other plays that prominent women of the Harlem Renaissance wrote, A Sunday Morning in the South (1925) was provoked by the inconsistencies of American life. These included the contrast between Christian doctrine and white America's treatment of black Americans, the experience of black men who returned from fighting in war to find they lacked constitutional rights, the economic disparity between whites and blacks, and miscegenation.

In 1926, Johnson's play Blue Blood won honorable mention in the Opportunity drama contest. Her play Plumes also won in the same competition in 1927. Plumes is a folk drama that relates the dilemma of Charity, the main character, whose baby daughter is dying. She has saved up money for the doctor, but also she and her confidante - Tilde - don't believe the medical care would be successful. She has in mind an extravagant funeral for her daughter instead - with plumes, hacks, and other fancy trimmings. Before Charity makes a decision, her daughter dies. Plumes was produced by the Harlem Experimental Theatre between 1928 and 1931.

Blue-Eyed Black Boy is a 1930 lynching genre play written to convince Congress to pass anti-lynching laws. This lesser known play premiered in Xoregos Performing Company's program: "Songs of the Harlem River" in New York City's Dream Up Festival, from August 30 to September 6, 2015. "Songs of the Harlem River - a collection of five one-act plays including Blue-Eyed Black Boy also opened the Langston Hughes Festival in Queens, New York, on February 13, 2016.

In 1935, Johnson wrote two historical plays, William and Ellen Craft and Frederick Douglass. William and Ellen Craft describes the escape of a black couple from slavery, in a work about the importance of self-love, the use of religion for support, and the power of strong relationships between black men and women. Her work Frederick Douglass is about his personal qualities that are not as much in the public eye: his love and tenderness for Ann, whom he met while still enslaved, and then was married to in freedom for over four decades. Other themes include the spirit of survival, the need for self-education, and the value of the community and of the extended family.

Johnson was one of the only women whose work was published in Alain Locke's anthology Plays of Negro Life: A Source-Book of Native American Drama. Although several of her plays are lost, Johnson's typescripts for 10 of her plays are in collections in academic institutions.

=== Anti-lynching activism ===
Although Johnson spoke out against race inequity as a whole, she is more known as a key advocate in the anti-lynching movement as well as a pioneering member of the lynching drama tradition. Her activism is primarily expressed through her plays, first appearing in the play Sunday Morning in the South in 1925. This outspoken, dramatic writing about racial violence is sometimes credited with her obscurity as a playwright since such topics were not considered appropriate for a woman at that time. Unlike many African-American playwrights, Johnson refused to give her plays a happy ending since she did not feel it was a realistic outcome. As a result, Johnson had difficulty getting plays published. Though she was involved in the NAACP's anti-lynching campaigns of 1936 and 1938, the NAACP refused to produce many of her plays claiming they gave a feeling of hopelessness. Johnson was also a member of the Writers League Against Lynching, which included Countée Cullen, James Weldon Johnson, Jessie Fauset, and Alain Locke. The organization sought a federal anti-lynching bill.

Gloria Hull in her book Color, Sex, and Poetry, argues that Johnson's work ought to be placed in an exceedingly distinguished place within the Harlem Renaissance, and that for African-American women writers "they desperately need and deserve long overdue scholarly attention". Hull, through a black feminist critical perspective, appointed herself the task of informing those within the dark of the very fact that African-American women, like Georgia Douglas Johnson, are being excluded from being thought of as key voices of the Harlem Renaissance. Johnson's anti-lynching activism was expressed through her plays such as The Ordeal, which was printed in Alain Locke's anthology The New Negro. Her poems describe African Americans and their mental attitude once having faced prejudice towards them and the way they modify it. Isolationism and anti-feminist prejudice however prevented the sturdy African-American women like Johnson from getting their remembrance and impact with such contributions.

=== S Street Salon ===
Soon after her husband's death in 1925, Johnson began to host what became 40 years of weekly "Saturday Salons" for friends and authors, including Langston Hughes, Jean Toomer, Anne Spencer, Richard Bruce Nugent, Alain Locke, Jessie Redmon Fauset, Angelina Weld Grimké and Eulalie Spence — all major contributors to the New Negro Movement, which is better known today as the Harlem Renaissance. Georgia Douglas Johnson's house at 1461 S Street NW would later become known as the S Street Salon. The salon was a meeting place for writers in Washington, D.C., during the Harlem Renaissance. Johnson's S Street Salon helped to nurture and sustain creativity by providing a place for African-American artists to meet, socialize, discuss their work, and exchange ideas. According to Akasha Gloria Hull, Johnson's role in creating a place for black artists to nurture their creativity made the movement a national one because she worked outside of Harlem and therefore made a trust for intercity connections. She has been described as "a woman of tremendous energy, much of which she channeled into her effort to create for the writers who gathered in her home on Saturday nights an atmosphere that was both intellectually stimulating and properly supportive."

Johnson called her home the "Half Way House" for friends traveling, and a place where they "could freely discuss politics and personal opinions" and where those with no money and no place to stay would be welcome. Although black men were allowed to attend, it mostly consisted of black women such as May Miller, Marita Bonner, Mary Burrill, Alice Dunbar-Nelson, Zora Neale Hurston, and Angelina Weld Grimke. Johnson was especially close to the writer Angelina Weld Grimké. This Salon was known to have discussions on issues such as lynching, women's rights, and the problems facing African-American families. They became known as the "Saturday Nighters."

=== Weekly column ===
Between 1926 and 1932, she wrote short stories, started a letter club, and published a weekly newspaper column called "Homely Philosophy".

The column was published in 20 different newspapers, including the New York News, Chicago Defender, Philadelphia Tribune, and Pittsburgh Courier and ran from 1926 to 1932. Some of the topics she wrote on were considered inspirational and spiritual for her audience, such as "Hunch", "Magnetic Personality", and "The Blessing of Work." Some of her work was known to help people cope with the hardships of the Great Depression.

One of the articles that focused on spirituality was "Our Fourth Eye", in which she wrote about "closing one's natural eyes" to look with the "eyes of one's mind". She explains that the "fourth eye" assists with viewing the world in this way. Another essay of Johnson's, titled "Hunch", discusses the idea that people have hunches, or intuition, in their lives. She goes on to explain that individuals must not quiet these hunches because they are their "sixth sense– your instruction".

== Legacy and honors ==
Throughout her life, Johnson wrote 200 poems, 28 plays and 31 short stories. In 1962, she published her last poetry book, entitled Share My World, the poems in which reflect on love towards all people and forgiveness.

In 1965, Atlanta University presented Douglas with an honorary doctorate of literature, praising her as a "sensitive singer of sad songs; faithful interpreter of the feminine heart of a Negro with its joys, sorrows, limitations and frustrations of racial oppression in a male-dominated world; dreamer of broken dreams...".

When she died in Washington, D.C., in 1966, one of her sister playwrights and a former participant of the S Street Salon, sat by her bedside "stroking her hand and repeating the words, 'Poet Georgia Douglas Johnson'".

In September 2009, it was announced that Johnson would be inducted into the Georgia Writers Hall of Fame.

== Major works ==
Poems

- The Heart of a Woman (1918)
- Bronze (1922)
- An Autumn Love Cycle (1928)
- Share My World (1962)
- The Ordeal

Plays

- A Sunday Morning in the South (1925)
- Blue Blood (1926)
- Paupaulekejo (1926)
- Plumes (1927)
- Safe (c. 1929)
- Blue-Eyed Black Boy (c. 1930)
- Starting Point (1930s)
- William and Ellen Craft (1935)
- Frederick Douglass (1935)
- And Yet They Paused (1938)
- A Bill to Be Passed (1938)
