= New York (Morand book) =

1930 travel book by Paul Morand

- First edition (French)
- Author: Paul Morand
- Translator: Hamish Miles
- Language: French
- Publisher: Flammarion
- Publication date: 1930
- Publication place: France
- English publication date: 1930
- Pages: 281

New York is a 1930 French language travel book by the French writer Paul Morand. Morand visited New York four times between 1925 and 1929 and shares his experiences from those trips, with a non-native reader in mind. An English translation by Hamish Miles was published in 1930.

== Synopsis ==
Morand's impressions of New York are both positive and negative. He disapproves of the upper class, the fashion, speakeasies and the area around Times Square. He is impressed by the City Hall and the buildings around Washington Square, which he regards as genuinely American and not false imitations of historical styles. He makes recurring references to the contemporary saying that "the Jews own New York, the Irish run it, and the Negroes enjoy it". In his conclusion, he writes: "I love New York because it is the greatest city of the universe and because its people are the toughest, the only people who, after the war, went on building, and who do not merely live on the capital of the past, the only ones, besides Italy, who do not demolish but construct."

== Reception ==
The Saturday Review's Theodore Purdy Jr. wrote about the book: "There is a good deal in it that is inaccurate, and the spellings of American names are confused as only a French proofreader can confuse them, yet on the whole M. Morand has seen New York well and truly, as well as in the impeccable perspective of modernity which is so characteristic of all his work." Purdy wrote that the book, in 1930, already was out of date as a guide book, as the skyline, night clubs and fashions all had changed since the author's visits, but wrote: "Yet the talent for assimilation, which has always been M. Morand's chief charm, as well as the great obstacle to his chance of writing anything lasting, is in this book ideally employed. Both the native and the passenger on an incoming liner may find things in his book which will bring the life of the city nearer and render it more understandable. In any case, M. Morand's interest in America is liable to repay both himself and the casual reader of his deceptively facile but extremely clever book."
