= Paul Morand =

French author (1888–1976)

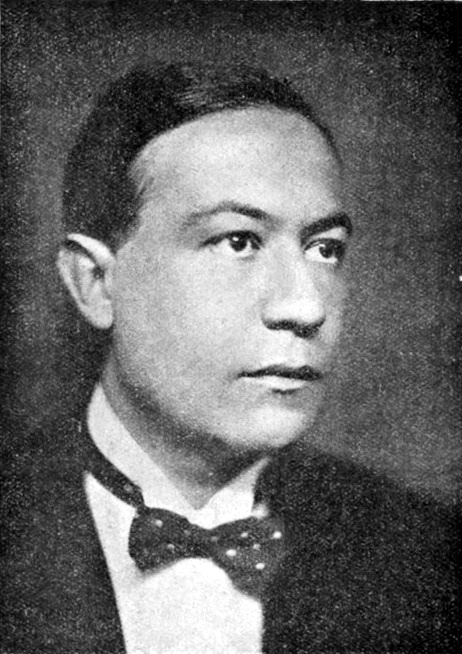
- Paul Morand, before 1925
- Born: 13 March 1888; Paris, France
- Died: 23 July 1976 (aged 88); Paris, France
- Occupations: Writer, essayist
- Writing career
- Literary movement: Modernist

Paul Morand (13 March 1888 – 23 July 1976) was a French author whose short stories and novellas were lauded for their style, wit and descriptive power. His most productive literary period was the interwar period of the 1920s and 1930s. He was much admired by the upper echelons of society and the artistic avant-garde who made him a cult favorite. He has been categorized as an early Modernist and Imagist.

Morand was a graduate of the Paris Institute of Political Studies, preparing him for a diplomatic career, and also attended Oxford University.

A member of the upper class and married into wealth, he held various diplomatic posts and traveled widely. He was typical of those in his social group who enjoyed lives of privilege and entitlement, adhering to the inevitability and desirability of class distinction.

Morand espoused a reflexive adherence to several ideologies. His intellectual influences included the writing of Friedrich Nietzsche, Oswald Spengler, and Joseph Arthur de Gobineau. During World War II, he pledged allegiance to the French Vichy regime, and became a government functionary.

He was a patron and inspirational figure for the Hussards literary movement, which opposed existentialism.

Morand made four bids for admission to the prestigious Académie française and was finally accepted in 1968, over the protest of Charles de Gaulle.

== Early years ==
Source material indicates that Morand was born in Russia to French parents who subsequently moved to Paris. Morand's father, Eugène Morand was a playwright and painter. The elder Morand was a curator at the Louvre and served as director of the École des Arts Décoratifs. The Morand home was a gathering place for the social elite and those notable in the arts and literature. Jules Massenet, composer of popular operas of the era, sculptor Auguste Rodin and writer Oscar Wilde were guests. As a youth Morand was introduced to the actress Sarah Bernhardt, and poet Stéphane Mallarmé. The multi-faceted writer and diplomat Jean Giraudoux was his tutor and became a lifelong friend. His father allied himself with those who believed in the innocence of Alfred Dreyfus.

Morand, a man of fin de siècle sensibilities, believed in the credo of "art for art's sake". He was ingrained with a deep pessimism, influenced by his father's cautionary advice to "be always distrustful". He was an intellectual proponent of Friedrich Nietzsche, and Oswald Spengler, espousing the philosophers’ belief in the decadence and decline of civilization. For Morand, class distinctions spoke to the natural order of a civilized society and he subscribed to theories based on the superiority/inferiority of race. He was influenced by the writing of Joseph Arthur de Gobineau, an aristocrat who presented his case for the superiority of the white race in an essay written in 1853, "Essay on the Inequality of the Human Races".

Morand was sent to study at Oxford University. In 1913, he was appointed cultural attaché to the French Embassy in London. His sojourn in England brought him into acquaintance with the prominent members of British society and aristocracy.

Morand often dined at the Hôtel Ritz in the company of Marcel Proust and his confidante, the Princess Hélène Soutzo. The Princess, born Hélène Chrissoveloni, was the daughter of a prominent Greek merchant banker. At the time she made Morand's acquaintance, she was married to an aristocrat of Greek-Romanian extraction, Prince Dimitri Soutzo. Morand and Princess Soutzo had an extended romantic liaison; she divorced her husband in 1924 and married Morand in 1927.

== World War I ==
Morand served briefly in the military prior to the outbreak of World War I, but managed to avoid active service in the hostilities and was assigned to the reserve corps. An avid, active sportsman, he had failed his medical exam as unfit for service. Many attributed this exemption to the intervention and influence held by his mistress, Princess Elena Suțu (née Chrissoveloni, 5 February 1879 in Galați – 26 February 1975 in Paris), the wife of the Romanian general and military attaché Prince Dimitri Suțu (Greek: Soutzos, Romanian: Suțu or Sutzu). His wealth allowed Morand to travel and indulge his interests in fast cars, fine horses and women.

During the war years, Morand's life of privilege continued unabated. He frequented the theatres, attended and gave lavish entertainments, and dined in the best restaurants. He spent 1914 to 1918 living alternately in England, Rome, Madrid and Paris. Morand cultivated the Dada and avant-garde art movements. It was in 1917 that he met Jean Cocteau at the premiere of Cocteau's ballet "Parade", whose musical score had been composed by Erik Satie and its production design executed by Pablo Picasso.

He wrote of his political sympathies during World War I in a journal he kept in 1916 and 1917, which appeared in a volume that was not published until 1948. Morand, like his compatriot, French politician Joseph Caillaux, was committed to effectuating a conciliatory relationship with the Germans and, in essence, the negotiation of a separate peace.

== Interwar period ==
His post-war life continued much as it had. A tradition of "Saturday dinners" had been established with Cocteau and his circle, congregating at the newly in vogue jazz milieu of the Paris cabaret, "Le Boeuf sur le Toit". Morand and the couturière Coco Chanel traveled in the same social circles and he became her friend and confidant.

In 1925, Morand was posted in the French legation in Bangkok, Thailand. He used this posting as a jumping off point for extensive travel. He documented his perceptions, filtered through a mindset of the privileged European who lived to the fullest a life of entitlement. He disparaged the cultures of countries through which his travels took him. He had strong theories on race, decrying that the world was becoming a "foul age of the half-caste". He derided democracy, bemoaning that Europe had become impotent, in his eyes, "egotistical, democratic, divided."

Morand had a brief stint in the French cinema. During this period, he met 18-year-old actress Josette Day (later "Belle" in Cocteau's film La Belle et la Bête), who became his mistress. Morand had been hired to collaborate with Alexandre Arnoux on a scenario for a proposed project, Don Quichotte, to star the opera singer Feodor Chaliapin. The French version of the film Don Quichotte was reviewed by The New York Times upon its opening in New York. Herbert L. Matthews, writing for the newspaper, criticized the Morand/Arnoux script but called it "an admirable film", attributable to the talents of director G. W. Pabst and its lead player Chaliapin.

Many were then fleeing Nazi Germany, with a proportion of those in the arts, many of them Jewish, taking refuge in France. Morand saw these exiles as unwanted interlopers. He penned a veiled, antisemitic, "xenophobic diatribe" titled "France la Doulce", replete with quaint, antique vocabulary. He demonized these emigrants (i.e., Jews) as "pirates" whether naturalized or not, called them "scum".

In October 1933, he wrote an article for a new weekly periodical edited by Henri Massis, who had a long-standing alliance with the antisemitic, political monarchists, Action Française. Morand alerted the French populace to the peril that was forthcoming:

"At this time, every country except ours is killing its vermin.... Don't let us leave Hitler to pride himself on being the only person to undertake the moral rehabilitation of the West."

== World War II ==
In August 1939, Morand was sent to London, assigned to a responsible post at the French embassy. In a prime position to ally himself with Charles de Gaulle and the Free French Forces, Morand instead deserted his post. He relocated to Vichy and swore allegiance to the Vichy government. Such a defection was in keeping with Morand's ideology, his long-term admiration for Philippe Pétain, and his association with the daughter of Pierre Laval, the Comtesse de Chambrun. There were dilemmas, however; as president of the film censorship board, Morand had to ban for moral reasons a film for which he had written the script.

He divided his time between Paris and Vichy, moving freely between the occupied and collaborationist sections of France. In 1941, he rallied against the hedonism of the French, championing the virtues of patriotism, vitality, and the Nietzschean "feeling of life" demonstrated by the Nazis. Morand and his pro-German wife welcomed into their Paris mansion the artists sanctioned and lauded by the Nazi regime, such as Arno Breker, Hitler's favorite sculptor.

In 1943, the Vichy government appointed Morand ambassador to Romania. His tenure in Bucharest earned him no diplomatic distinction. He spent his time using his stature to benefit his own interests and plunder the embassy. During air raids over Bucharest in 1944, Morand fled. He was subsequently transferred to Bern, Switzerland, where he and his wife remained after the war.

== Later life ==
After the war, he was charged with collaboration with the enemy, but suffered no penalty other than having his government pension revoked.

He spent the following years residing in Switzerland, Tangier, the Hôtel de Crillon, and his wife's opulent Paris home.

Morand became an inspirational figure for a literary group who espoused their views in the anti-existentialist journal The Hussards, founded by his friend Roger Nimier.

Morand had sought election into the Académie française in 1939 and 1941, and both times his bid was denied. He attempted to achieve the prestigious distinction again in 1958. This third attempt illuminated the record of his wartime activities and generated an organized opposition to his membership. Charles de Gaulle vetoed his admission. Morand ultimately was granted membership in 1968 but was denied the formal ceremonies that traditionally accompanied the investiture of new members, and de Gaulle refused to receive him at the Elysée Palace.

It is believed that Morand never reassessed his elitist worldview and political ideology, resolutely retaining his mindset until the end of his life. In interviews, he consistently contrived to evade any references to World War II. It is further posited that he and his wife had used their position to make some attempts to aid Jewish friends, but that it was done to highlight the influence and power they held in the Nazi regime, rather than a demonstration of their humanity. He never came to recognize the suffering that millions endured under totalitarianism.

== Legacy ==
Ezra Pound, who was then living in Paris, translated his first volume of short stories, titled Tendre Stocks, into English. Marcel Proust supplied the preface. With the publication of two volumes of poetry, Lampes à arc (Arc-Lamps) and Feuilles de température, (Temperature Records), he gained attention and praise that garnered renewed interest in his earlier work. His output was prolific in the interwar period of the 1920s and 1930s, and tapered off during World War II.

Morand made four trips to New York City between 1925 and 1929. He attended soirees which featured such American cultural notables as Carl Van Vechten, F. Scott Fitzgerald and his wife Zelda, Louise Bryant and her future husband, diplomat William Bullitt.

In 1930, Morand published his observations of the Manhattan scene in New York. Morand explains that he wrote strictly from the viewpoint of the foreign visitor for the foreign reader; he "followed no other method of telling about New York than to show what pleased me."

Reviewing the book, one critic noted that Morand "keeps on repeating the contemporary bromide that ‘the Jews own New York, the Irish run it, and the Negroes enjoy it...Italians hardly can be assimilated.’" Speakeasies, Morand had concluded: "I can not think of anything sadder." New York City's theatre/entertainment district, the Broadway thoroughfare and its central hub Times Square, suggested to Morand an apocalyptic future:

"[Broadway is] a profanation of everything of music, of art, of love, of colors. Here I have a complete vision of the end of the world."

In spite of his eccentric summations on New York culture, Morand expressed his appreciation for the city — concurrently disclosing his admiration for the fascist leadership of Benito Mussolini:

"I love New York because it is the greatest city in the universe...the only people who after the war [World War I] went on building...besides Italy, who do not demolish but construct."

Morand was considered a writer of cosmopolitan sensibility who created vivid scenarios of life amid the dislocations — and what some saw as the moral disintegration — of post-World War I Europe. The writing was fast-paced, noteworthy for its wit and mastery of descriptive style. The stories reflected an urban ennui and disillusionment felt by those leading lives fueled by intense emotions and hedonistic self-indulgence. Georges Lemaître wrote in 1938: "Beyond any doubt Morand is the most typical representative and interpreter of French literature today...His defects and merits, are they not the defects and merits of the world today..." Supporters and enthusiasts of Morand, Cocteau and André Breton appreciated his "spiteful humour and surreal urban poetry, and aphoristic prose." French critics praised his descriptive facility with words, leading them to categorize him as a "modernist", and "imagist".

In 1945, Morand traveled to St. Moritz at the request of Coco Chanel who had enlisted him to write her memoirs. The result was The Allure of Chanel, a slim volume promoted as a conversation between the author and his subject.

Morand's post-World War II literary output concentrated on historical novellas. He devised exotic locales and historical events as metaphors for contemporary politics — "decoding the past as a link to the present." The plots, replete with counterrevolutionaries, nobility unjustly victimized, highlighted collaborationist heroes seeking redemption. In these works Morand was making a case for himself; his fictional characters serving as proxies for an apologist justification of his own wartime activity. "...Many of Morand's historical figures...[can be] likened to a comedian, accidentally thrust into the unfolding drama of history...a comedy of errors...[the characters] merely symbols." Parfait de Saligny appeared in 1946. Le Flagellant de Séville, 1946, draws parallels between the Napoleonic wars and the Nazi occupation of Europe. La Folle amoureuse, Montociel: le rajah aux grandes Indes, were published in 1947.

Not all critics were laudatory. While acknowledging his masterful use of language, they cited the lack of substance in his observations and tendency towards generalizations. It was said his characters were not fully realized portraits but presented to the reader as exaggerated personages, crafted for effect.

Over time, critical appraisal of Morand's work has undergone revision. While recognized for his technique, the content of his work has been faulted for its lack of insightful analysis of a people in cultural context, instead relying on generalizations and stereotype. His work speaks to the

"marked insistence on reinforcing preconceptions about national characteristics...It "conveys not just a failure of humane sympathy but a political outlook that posits the Spenglerian collapse of Western civilization into chaos."

Morand's writing disclosed his "nostalgia for authority and order" which in his view, was under threat by the insistent forces of democracy.

== Death ==
Morand died in Paris on 23 July 1976, at the age of 88.

== Bibliography ==
- Tendres Stocks (1921) – "fond memories of women Morand had known before and during the 1914–18 War"
  - Green Shoots (English translation by H. I. Woolf, 1924)
  - Fancy Goods (English translation by Ezra Pound, 1984)
  - Tender Shoots (English translation by Euan Cameron, 2011)
- Ouvert la nuit (1922)
  - Open All Night (1923) (English translation by Ezra Pound, 1984)
- Fermé la nuit (1923)
- Lewis and Irene (Lewis et Irène) (1924)
- L'Europe galante (1925)
- Rien que la terre (1926)
- The Living Buddha (Bouddha vivant) (1927)
- 1900 (1931)
- Bucarest (1935)
- The Man in a Hurry (L'Homme pressé) (1941)
- Le Bazar de la Charité (1944)
- Fouquet ou Le Soleil offusqué (Paris, Éditions Gallimard, 1961)
- Venices (Venises) (1971)
- Journal inutile (mémoires, en 2 volumes, 2002)
  - Rien que la terre
  - Black Magic (Magie noire) (1928)
  - Paris-Tombouctou
  - New York (1930)
  - World Champions (Champions du monde) (1930)
  - Papiers d'identité (1930)
  - Air indien
  - Londres
  - Rococo
  - La Route des Indes
  - L'heure qu'il est, chroniques de cet infatigable voyageur
- Le Dernier Jour de l'Inquisition
- Le Flagellant de Séville
- Le Coucou et le Roitelet
- L'Eau sous les ponts
- Hecate and Her Dogs (Hécate et ses chiens) (1954)
- La Folle amoureuse
- Fin de siècle (1957)
- Nouvelles d'une vie
- Les Écarts amoureux (1974)
- The Allure of Chanel (L'Allure de Chanel) (1976)
