= Dikran Tahta =

Armenian mathematician, teacher and author (1928–2006)

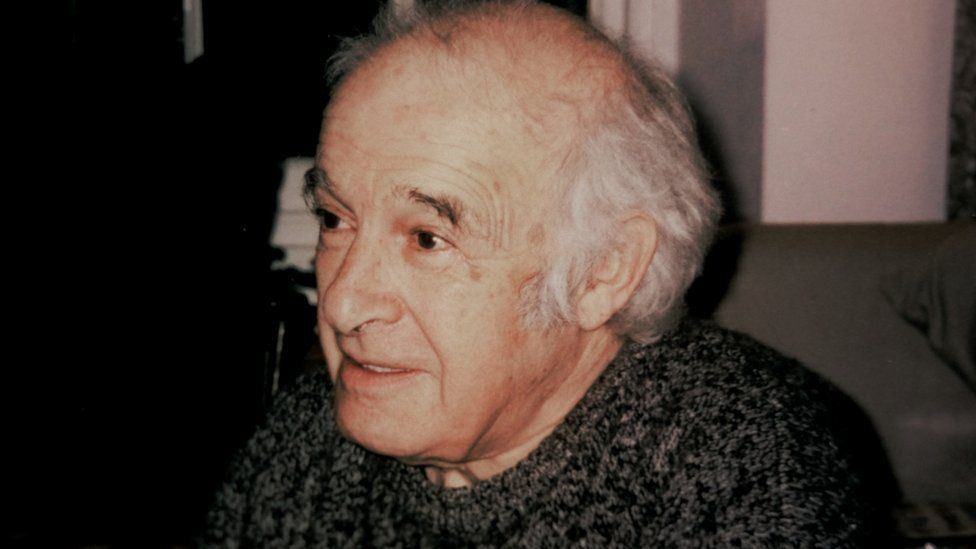
Dikran Tahta

Dikran Tahta (Armenian: Դիքրան (Տիգրան) Թահթա, 7 August 1928 – 2 December 2006) was a British mathematician, teacher and author. He was also the maths teacher of Stephen Hawking.

== Early life ==
Dikran Tahta was a descendant of Istanbul-based Armenian family of cotton merchants. His father, Kevork Tahtabrounian, (1895–1980), settled in Manchester with his wife in 1927, after the First World War and the Armenian genocide, shortening his surname to Tahta. Kevork ran a branch of the business which took the name Manchester Textile Exporters and was able to donate £100,000 to the Armenian Community Council, which enabled the community to set up a Trust for the benefit of the Community's Religious, Educational and Cultural needs, including the school named after Kevork Tahta.

Much of Dikran's childhood, including the influence of his Armenian religious upbringing, is reflected in his penultimate book Ararat Associations. Dikran remembers how his "father, who would be standing, like the other males, with open arms extended in their own way of praying. Kneeling was for women and children". In the book, he notes how his parents were keen for their children to have an English education, yet to speak Armenian at home. Dikran was christened by Bishop Tourian in the Holy Trinity Armenian Church in Manchester, and his first name Dikran was shortened to Dick. He never forgot his Armenian roots. In his childhood, he would visit his relatives in Istanbul every other year.

From Rossall School, in Fleetwood, Lancashire, Dikran gained a scholarship to Christ Church, Oxford, in 1946. His main subject was mathematics, but he also read widely in English literature, philosophy and history.

== Career ==
Between graduating the university and just before the national service, Tahta took time out to catalogue the library of the late Archbishop Matheos Indjeian (1877–1950), and read a number of his books.

Tahta did national service in the RAF from 1950 to 1952, then after a brief foray into journalism, he returned to Rossall School in 1954, where he began teaching English and History. In 1955, he moved to teach mathematics at St Albans School, Hertfordshire, where the young Stephen Hawking was a pupil. When asked later to name a teacher who had inspired him, Hawking named "Mr Tahta". Tahta remained at St Albans for six years before taking up the post of lecturer in mathematics education at St Luke's College, Exeter, in 1961. By 1974, he was a Mathematics tutor at the University of Exeter's School of Education at Thornlea, on the New North Road. In 1978, the School of Education merged with St Luke's College to form the University's Department of Education. He remained there until his retirement in late 1981.

In the 1970s Tahta was involved in the ATV television programme of mathematics for schools entitled 'Leapfrogs' (produced and directed by Paul Martin), promoting visual approaches to mathematics. His paper "On Geometry" argued that geometrical approaches to mathematics could not be reduced to algebraic approaches. In line with this thinking, he produced the ATM book Geometric Images, and co-authored Images of Infinity with Ray Hemmings. The Leapfrogs group of Tahta and Hemmings, together with David Sturgess, Leo Rogers and Derick Last also produced hands-on teaching materials including workbooks for the polycube. He also drew upon insights into pedagogy in the writings of Mary Boole on mathematics education.

After retirement, Tahta went to teach in the United States and South Africa, and became a tutor for the Open University.

His last book was The Fifteen Schoolgirls about Thomas Kirkman, known for the Kirkman's schoolgirl problem, a problem in combinatorics, which also delved into the byways of Victorian amateur mathematics.

== Legacy ==
In his obituary, The Guardian newspaper described Tahta as "one of the outstanding mathematics teachers of his generation", who was notable for having inspired physicist Stephen Hawking. The Guardian commented on his death that "He was a wise and generous man who inspired love and an increase of intellectual energy in everyone who came within his ambit." Hawking later commented that "Thanks to Mr Tahta, I became a professor of mathematics at Cambridge, a position once held by Isaac Newton".

== Bibliography ==
=== Books ===
- A Boolean anthology: Selected writings of Mary Boole—on mathematical education, 1972 (Compiled by D.G. Tahta).
- Tahta, D. and Brookes, W. (1966) "The Genesis of Mathematical Activity", in W. Brookes (Ed.) The Development of Mathematical Activity in Children: the place of the problem in this development
- Images of Infinity, with Ray Hemmings
- Ararat Associations, Black Apollo Press, ISBN 1-900355-50-7
- The Fifteen Schoolgirls, Black Apollo Press, ISBN 1-900355-48-5

=== Journal articles and book chapters ===
- Tahta, D. (1981a) ‘About geometry’, for the Learning of Mathematics, 1(1), 2-9.
- Tahta, D. (1981b) ‘Some thoughts arising from the new Nicolet films’, Mathematics Teaching, 94, 25-9.
- Tahta, D. (1985) ‘On notation’, Mathematics Teaching, 112, 49-51.
- Tahta, D. (1988) ‘Lucas turns in his grave’, in Pimm, D. (ed.) Mathematics, Teachers and Children, London, Hodder and Stoughton, pp. 306–12.
- Tahta, D. (1990a) ‘Is there a geometrical imperative?’, Mathematics Teaching, 129, 20-9.
- Tahta, D. (1990b) ‘Gratifying usefulness’, Mathematics Teaching, 132, 57-8.
- Tahta, D. (1991) ‘Understanding and desire’, in Pimm, D. and Love, E. (eds) Teaching and Learning School Mathematics, London, Hodder and Stoughton, pp. 221–46.
- Tahta, D. (1992) ‘Curricular configurations’, Micromath, 8(2), 37-9.
