= Matheos =

Matheos may refer to:

- Jim Matheos (born 1962), American guitarist
- Matheos Indjeian (1877-1950), Armenian Apostolic Archbishop of Manchester, England

== See also ==
- Arch/Matheos, American progressive metal project
- Patriarch Matheos (disambiguation)
