= Sarah Trimmer =

English writer and critic (1741–1810)

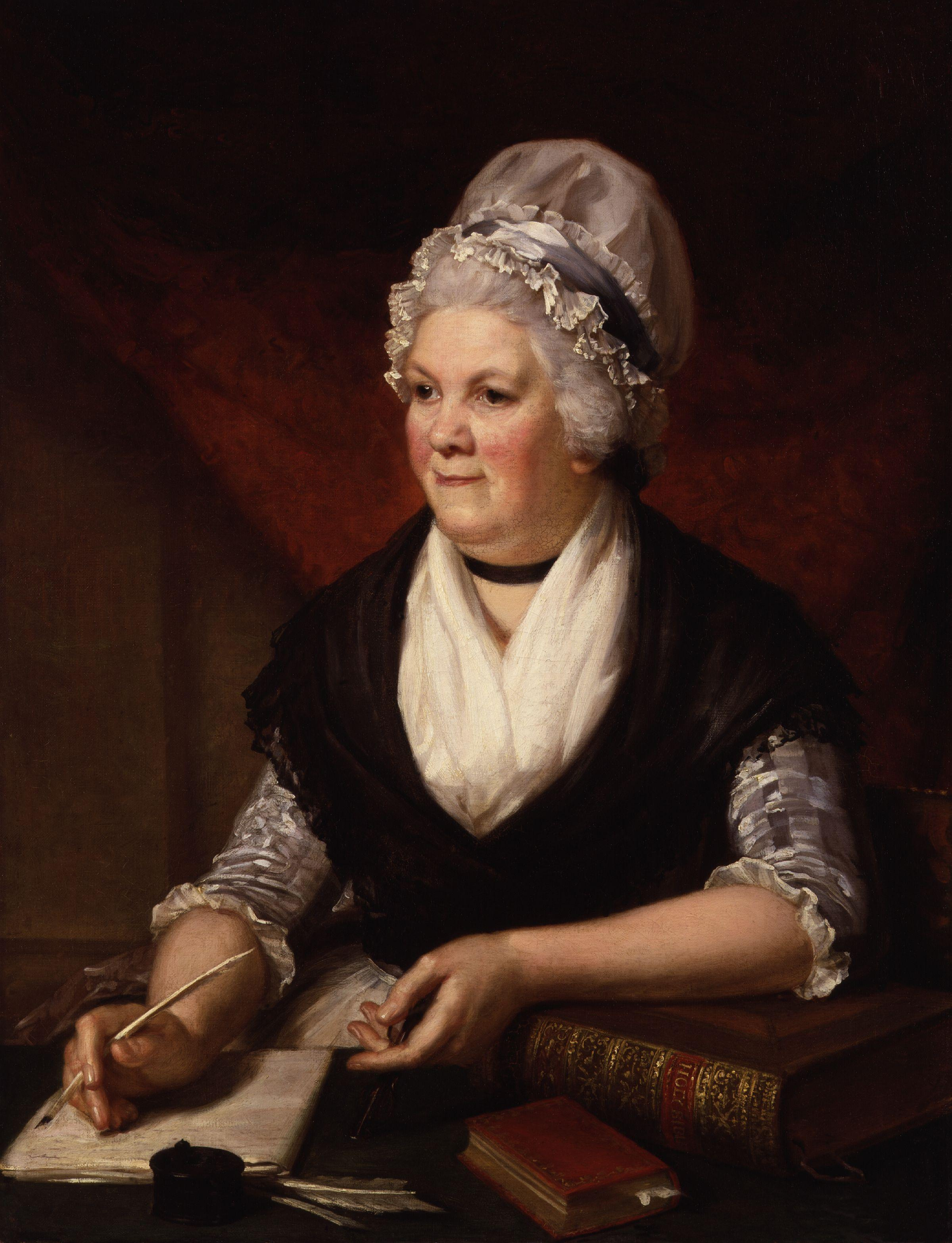
- Portrait of Sarah Trimmer, 1798
- Born: 6 January 1741; Ipswich, Suffolk, England
- Died: 15 December 1810 (aged 69); Brentford, London, England
- Occupation: Writer

Sarah Trimmer (née Kirby; 6 January 1741 – 15 December 1810) was an English writer and critic of 18th-century British children's literature, as well as an educational reformer. Her periodical, The Guardian of Education, helped to define the emerging genre by seriously reviewing children's literature for the first time; it also provided the first history of children's literature, establishing a canon of the early landmarks of the genre that scholars still use today. Trimmer's most popular children's book, Fabulous Histories, inspired numerous children's animal stories and remained in print for over a century.

Trimmer was also an active philanthropist. She founded several Sunday schools and charity schools in her parish. To further these educational projects, she wrote textbooks and manuals for women interested in starting their own schools. Trimmer's efforts inspired other women, such as Hannah More, to establish Sunday school programmes and to write for children and the poor.

Trimmer's works are dedicated to maintaining many aspects of the social and political status quo. As a high church Anglican, she was intent on promoting the established Church of England and on teaching young children and the poor the doctrines of Christianity. Her writings outlined the benefits of social hierarchy, arguing that each class should remain in its God-given position. Yet, while supporting many of the traditional political and social ideologies of her time, Trimmer questioned others, such as those surrounding gender and the family.

== Early life ==
Sarah Trimmer was born on 6 January 1741 in Ipswich, England, to Joshua Kirby and Sarah (née Bull); her father was a noted artist and served as president of the Society of Artists of Great Britain. Trimmer had one younger brother, William; she was apparently the better writer, for she would sometimes compose his school essays for him. As a young girl, Trimmer attended Mrs. Justiner's boarding school in Ipswich, an experience she always remembered fondly. In 1755, the family moved to London when her father, who had written several important works on perspective, became the tutor of perspective to the Prince of Wales. Because of her father's connections within the artistic community, Trimmer was able to meet the painters William Hogarth and Thomas Gainsborough as well as the by-then legendary writer and critic Samuel Johnson. She made a favourable impression on Johnson when she immediately produced her pocket copy of John Milton's Paradise Lost (1667) to help settle a dispute between her father and Johnson over a particular passage. Johnson, delighted that she admired Milton enough to carry his works with her at all times, "subsequently invited her to his house and presented her with a volume of his famous periodical The Rambler". In 1759, at the urging of his former pupil the Prince of Wales (soon to be George III), her father was made Clerk of the Works to the Royal Household at Kew Palace and the family moved to Kew. There she met James Trimmer, whom she married on 20 September 1762 at St Mary, Ealing; after their marriage, the couple moved to Old Brentford.

== Motherhood and philanthropy ==
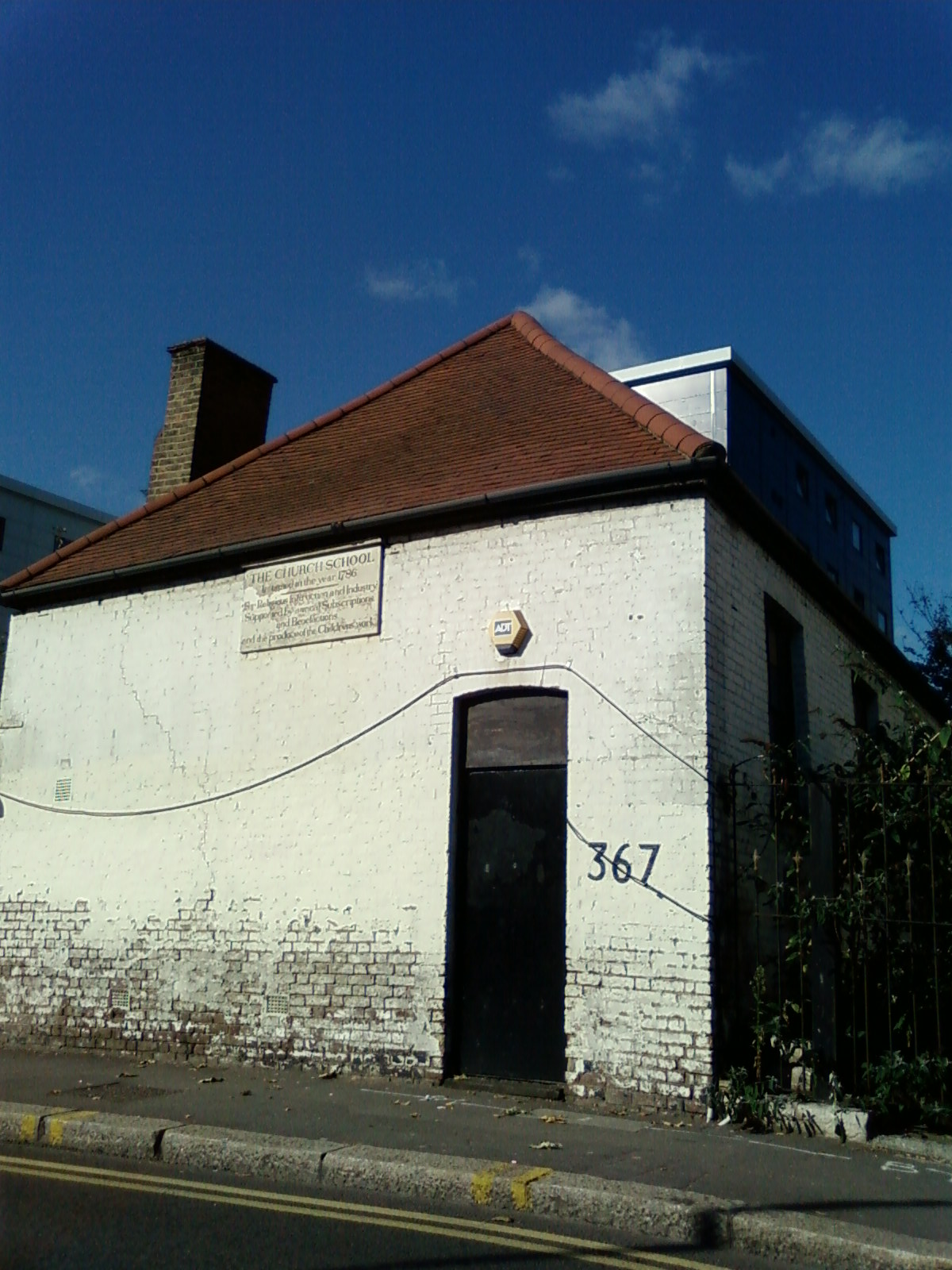
Sarah Trimmer's Sunday School in Brentford

Trimmer was close to her parents; after her marriage, she walked to visit her father every day, later accompanied by her eldest children. She and her husband had 12 children in all—six boys and six girls. Trimmer was responsible for her children's education and it was the combination of her duties as a mother and a teacher that initially sparked her interest in education.

Inspired by Robert Raikes, Trimmer also became active in the Sunday school movement, founding the first Sunday school for poor children in Old Brentford in 1786. She and two of the ministers in her parish, Charles Sturgess and Charles Coates, organized a fund drive and established several schools for the poor children of the neighbourhood. Initially, five hundred boys and girls wanted to attend Trimmer's Sunday school; unable to accommodate such numbers, she decided to exclude those under five years of age and restricted each family to one pupil. The parish set up three schools, each with about thirty students—one for older boys, one for younger boys and one for girls. While some other educational reformers of the period such as Mary Wollstonecraft argued for co-educational instruction, Trimmer was opposed to such pedagogical changes; she believed in educating the sexes separately. The students were taught to read, with the aim of teaching them to read the Bible. The students were also encouraged to keep clean—"a present of a brush and comb was given to all who desired them". Trimmer's schools became so well known and admired that Raikes, Trimmer's initial inspiration, recommended those who needed assistance organising a Sunday school to turn to Trimmer; even Queen Charlotte asked Trimmer's advice on founding a Sunday school at Windsor.

After her visit to the queen, Trimmer was inspired to write The Œconomy of Charity, which describes how readers, specifically women, can establish Sunday schools in their own communities. However, her book accomplished much more than this. While proponents of Sunday schools such as Raikes and Trimmer claimed that the schools would help control the growing social unrest of the poor, critics claimed that these schools would only encourage the social upheaval they were trying to quell. The Hon. John Byng, for example, issued the dire warning that "not only would education 'teach them to read seditious pamphlets, books and publications against Christianity'... but it would render them unfit for 'the laborious employment to which their rank in society had destined them'". Trimmer agreed that the social hierarchy was divinely ordained, but believed that her Sunday Schools would reinforce it. The Sunday school debate was waged in churches, in Parliament and in print; in publishing The Œconomy of Charity, Trimmer was entering this vigorous debate.

As scholar Deborah Wills has argued: "[The Œconomy of Charity] is actually informed by a highly politicized subtext which anticipates, subverts, and counters anti-Sunday School arguments. [Trimmer] outlines a programme through which the Sunday School, when properly administered, can serve as a means of instituting social control and intensifying hierarchy... Trimmer's carefully modest and unassuming text is thus revealed as a middle-class manifesto for the appropriation of social, political, and religious power in the name of moral instruction."

For example, Trimmer contends that Sunday schools teach their pupils not merely to read the Bible but also how to draw the proper theological and political conclusions from it. Furthermore, Trimmer argues that the responsibility for educating the poor rests on the shoulders of the middle class alone. By eliminating the aristocracy from an active role in her philanthropic programs, "Trimmer ensures that those who actually regulate the Sunday School curriculum are those who will both embody and perpetuate bourgeois virtues". As Wills points out, this distinguishes her from other philanthropists of the time such as Hannah More.

O Lord, I wish to promote thy holy religion which is dreadfully neglected. I am desirous to save young persons from the vices of the age.

— Sarah Trimmer

Trimmer also founded and oversaw charity schools in her neighbourhood. She directed promising students from her Sunday schools, which met only once a week, to these charity schools, which met several times a week. As she wrote in her journal, these schools seemed to her to "afford a happy prospect of rescuing many poor children from vice and profligacy". While the Sunday schools were funded by subscription, that is, donations from people within the parish, the charity schools were largely funded by the Society for the Propagation of Christian Knowledge (SPCK), which had funded the first charity schools around a century earlier. Trimmer criticised the rote learning that went on in traditional charity schools and tried to institute a more dynamic catechetical method in her own schools that would stimulate students to ask questions. She wrote in her journal, "my earnest desire is to compose a course of teaching for Charity Schools, by which the children may learn in reality, and not by rote, the principles of the Christian Religion, as taught in the Scriptures". Trimmer also established schools of industry to which she directed her less promising pupils. These schools would teach girls, for example, how to knit and spin. Initially, Trimmer believed that the schools would turn a profit since the girls would spin and knit all day long; however, the girls were unskilled and turned out poor products that could not be sold. Trimmer viewed this project as a failure.

Wilfried Keutsch, a modern scholar of the 18th century, has criticised Trimmer's projects as naive and moralistic:

[There is] no indication that Sarah Trimmer based her many efforts to instruct and improve the children of the poor on detailed social analysis, but it is apparent that she was deeply disturbed not only by their needs but also about the increasing pauperization of the country. Whether she understood that society was changing from a more feudal to a more modern bourgeois structure, in which many of the stabilizing old personal ties were removed and replaced by the cash-nexus, is not clear... on the whole she displays no interest in the social and economic causes of poverty. Instead she offers a model of improvement which rests on a rigorous division of the working people and the poor into black and white: the deserving and the undeserving poor, the godly and the ungodly, the respectable and dutiful and the rebellious and undutiful, the idle and the industrious, that is, on an alternating identification of poverty with virtue and vice.

Although Sunday schools such as the ones established by Trimmer have often been characterised by modern scholars as a repressive device used by the middle class to impose their morality on the lower classes, Thomas Laqueur has argued that the poor embraced this opportunity to obtain literacy and disregarded many of the moral lessons forced upon them.

== Literary career ==
In a literary career that spanned more than a quarter of a century, Trimmer authored somewhere between 33 and 44 texts. She wrote in a wide range of genres: textbooks, teaching manuals, children's literature, political pamphlets and critical periodicals. While many of her texts were for children, some of her works, such as The Œconomy of Charity, were also for specific adult audiences. Still others were written for both children and adults, such as The Servant's Friend (1786–87), which was meant to instruct servants of all ages.

Throughout her career, Trimmer worked with four different publishers—John Marshall, T.N. Longman, G. Robinson, and Joseph Johnson—and, by 1800, she had the most works of any author in the Newbery catalogue, the catalogue that sold the most children's literature. Eventually, Trimmer stopped publishing with Joseph Johnson, because she disagreed with his politics—he was a supporter of the French Revolution and was publishing works that she considered subversive.

=== An Easy Introduction to the Knowledge of Nature ===
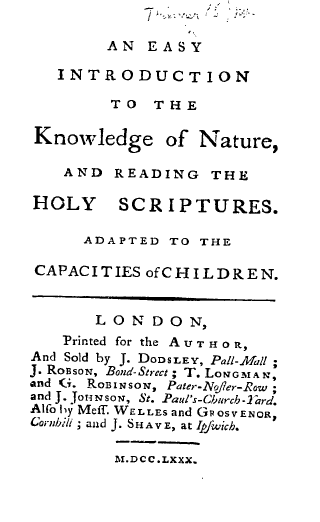
Title page from the first edition of An Easy Introduction to the Knowledge of Nature (1780)

Trimmer's first book was An easy introduction to the knowledge of nature, and reading the holy scriptures, adapted to the capacities of children (1780), which built on the revolution in children's literature begun by Anna Laetitia Barbauld. In the "Preface", Trimmer writes that Isaac Watts's Treatise on Education was the inspiration for the work and that "a book containing a kind of general survey of the works of Nature would be very useful, as a means to open the mind by gradual steps to the knowledge of the SUPREME BEING, preparatory to their reading the holy scriptures". In the text, the reader follows a mother and her two children, Charlotte and Henry (perhaps named after two of Trimmer's own children), on a series of nature walks during which the mother describes the wonders of God's creation. In 1793, a version of this book was added to the catalogue of the Society for the Propagation of Christian Knowledge; after 77 years, it had sold over 750,000 copies.

Aileen Fyfe, a historian interested in the relationship between science and religion, has argued that Trimmer's text, although inspired by Barbauld's books, differs dramatically from Barbauld's in its religious orientation. Barbauld was a Dissenter and more inclined, according to Fyfe, to "encourage curiosity, observation, and reasoning". In contrast, Trimmer, as a high church Anglican, depicted nature as "awe-inspiring" and as a reflection not only of God's divinity but also of his goodness. These beliefs are reflected even in the structure of the text; Trimmer's aim was to convey a sense of the awe, therefore her text does not progress in an orderly fashion through a study of the natural world. Barbauld's texts, however, emphasize the slow accumulation of knowledge as well as logical thinking. Thus Evenings at Home, which she co-wrote with her brother, John Aikin, has a "systematic structure". Another difference between the two writers lies in the role of authority: whereas Barbauld's texts and those she wrote with her brother, emphasize dialogues between teacher and pupil, Trimmer's textual conversations, Fyfe notes, were "controlled by the parent".

However, Donelle Ruwe, a scholar of 18th-century children's literature, has pointed out that An Easy Introduction is not entirely a conservative text—it challenges 18th-century notions of the proper roles for women laid out in conduct manuals such as those written by John Gregory and James Fordyce. The mother in Trimmer's text acts as a "spiritual leader" and demonstrates that a woman is capable of "theological reasoning". Such depictions challenge Jean-Jacques Rousseau's claims that women are capable only of memorizing religious dogma and not of sophisticated reasoning. Furthermore, Trimmer's mother tries to educate her children in a straightforward manner instead of employing the "manipulative" tricks of the tutor in Rousseau's Emile.

A few years later, inspired by Madame de Genlis's Adèle et Théodore (1782), Trimmer commissioned sets of illustrations of the Bible for which she provided the commentary; she also published print/commentary sets of ancient history and British history. These various sets were very popular and could be purchased together (commentary and prints) or individually. The prints were usually hung on walls or bound into books.

=== Relations with John Marshall ===
The children's publisher John Marshall & Co. produced The footstep to Mrs. Trimmer's Sacred history: for the instruction and amusement of little children, a moral exegesis for children's ministry, in 1785. Trimmer had always advocated the use of pictorial material in books for children, and the publisher, who was experienced in producing cheap popular prints, was in a good position to publish them for her. In May 1786 Marshall published A series of prints of scripture history, "designed as ornaments for those apartments in which children receive the first rudiments of their education." The prints were sold "pasted on boards, for hanging up in nurseries" at 1s 6d, in sheets for 8d, sewed in marbled paper 'for the pocket,' for 10d. or else neatly bound in read leather at 1s 2d. They were also published with an accompanying small book entitled A description of a set of prints of scripture history, which was also available in different bindings. The venture proved to be successful and these two works were quickly followed by the publication of five similar 'Series of Prints' together with accompanying 'Descriptions', compiled by Mrs Trimmer, on the subjects of Ancient history (1786), Roman history (1789), English history (1789), the New Testament (1790) and the Old Testament (1797). These were hugely popular and were reprinted by the Marshalls and their successors at regular intervals over the next thirty years.

In January (1788) Mrs Trimmer and John Marshall announced a new joint venture, The family magazine; or a repository of religious instruction and rational amusement. It was a monthly periodical "designed to counteract the pernicious tendency of immoral books &c. which have circulated of late years among the inferior classes of people," and usually included one engraved plate. The content consisted of 'religious tales for Sunday evenings' and 'moral tales for weekdays'; advice on the management of infants and on childrearing was given together with a comparative view of other nations to demonstrate that 'the poor in England possess privileges, and enjoy many comforts, which persons of their rank ... in other countries cannot enjoy.' Descriptions of animals were also included, 'in order to check the practice of cruelty to brute creation.' The final section of the magazine contained 'a selection of Ballads, Songs &c., both ancient and modern, of a Moral Tendency.' Thus, in both its objects and content, this publication introduced many of the ideas which would later bear fruit in Hannah More's more ambitious and well-known scheme for Cheap Repository Tracts of 1795.

=== Books for charity schools ===
Because, in Trimmer's opinion, there was a dearth of good educational material to use in charity schools, she decided to write her own. The series of books she produced between 1786 and 1798 were used in Britain and its colonies well into the 19th century. Trimmer was an able promoter of her materials; she knew that her books would not reach large numbers of poor children in charity schools unless they were funded and publicized by the SPCK. She wrote in her journal "my scheme without its aid, will fall to the ground". Thus, she joined the society in 1787. In 1793, she sent 12 copies of her treatise Reflections upon the Education in Charity Schools with the Outlines of a Plan Appropriate Instruction for the Children of the Poor to the subcommittee that chose the books funded by the organization. In the treatise, she argued that the current charity school curriculum was outdated (it was over 100 years old) and needed to be replaced. She suggested a list of seven books that she herself would write:

- A Spelling Book in two Parts
- Scripture Lessons from the Old Testament
- Scripture Lessons from the New Testament
- Moral Instructions from the Scriptures
- Lessons on the Liturgy from the Book of Common Prayer
- Exemplary Tales
- The Teacher's Assistant

The committee largely accepted her proposal. The Charity School Spelling Book was printed first and was the most widely used. It was one of the first children's books for the poor that was small but still had large type and large margins (features often considered appropriate only for books for more privileged readers). The stories themselves were also innovative: they emphasized the ordinary lives of ordinary children—"these children climbed trees, played with fire, threw cricket bats at sheep and begged in the streets". The book was adopted by Andrew Bell around 1800 for his Madras system of education and by various educational societies throughout Britain and its colonies; it was even used to educate slaves in Antigua and Jamaica.

The proposed "Scripture Lessons" became Trimmer's An Abridgement of Scripture History, consisting of Lessons selected from the Old Testament, for the Use of Schools and Families which was an anthology of selections from the Bible. Like the Charity School Spelling Book, it was adopted throughout the British educational system and was part of school life well into the mid-19th century. In 1798 SPCK published Scripture Catechisms, Part I and II; these works were intended to aid the teacher while the Abridgements (a shorthand name for the Scripture Histories of both the Old and New Testament that Trimmer eventually published) were intended to aid the pupil. The "Exemplary Tales" seem not to have been written exactly as planned but Trimmer's Servant's Friend and Two Farmers fulfilled the purpose she outlined in her plan of publishing pleasurable moral tales. These two books served as Sunday school prizes as well. The Teacher's Assistant was an instruction aid and was also widely adopted throughout British schools. The only texts not published by the SPCK were Trimmer's adaptations and commentaries on the Book of Common Prayer, which she had printed elsewhere.

=== Fabulous Histories ===
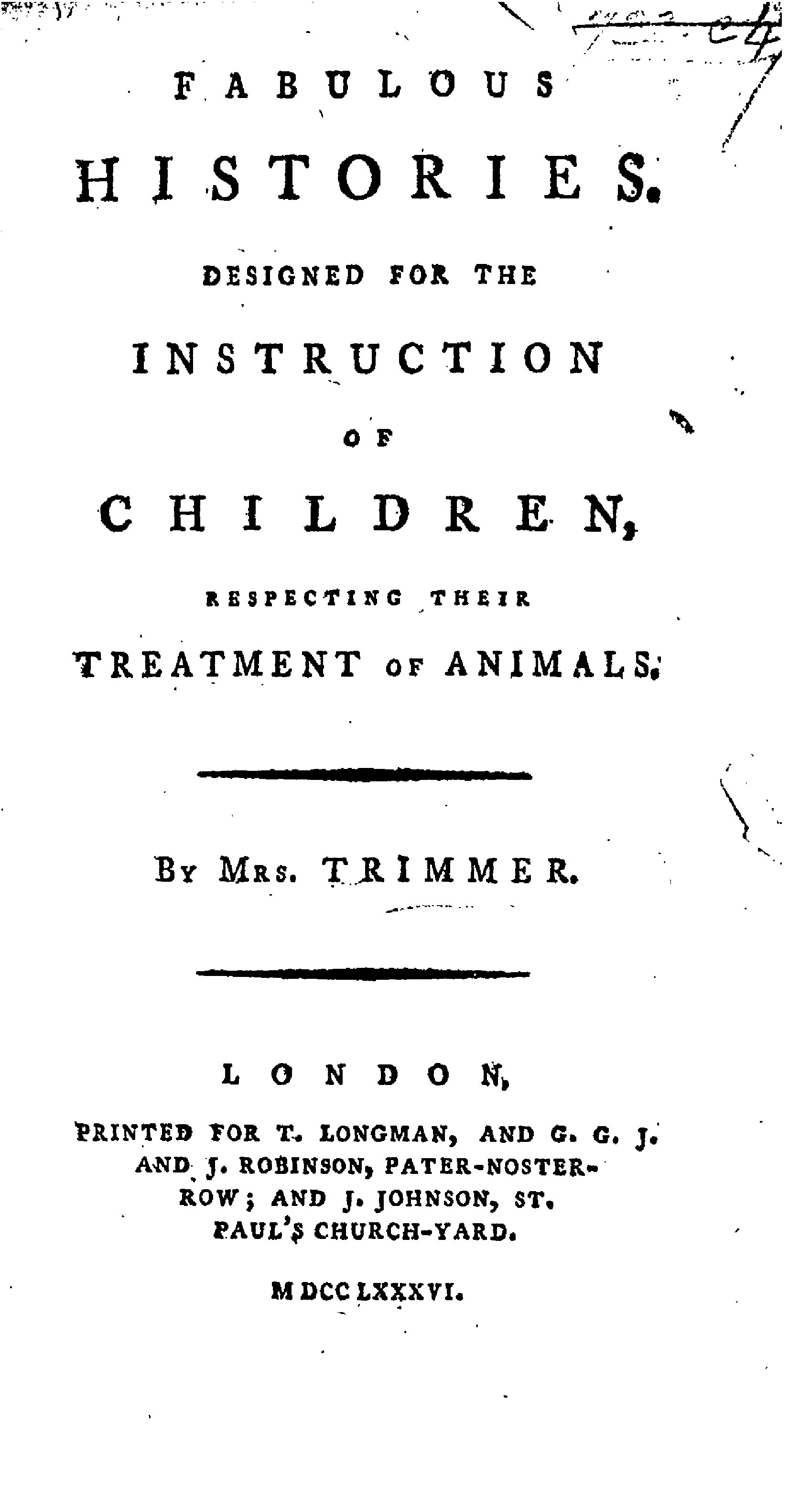
Title page from the first edition of Trimmer's Fabulous Histories (1786)

Fabulous Histories (later known as The Story of the Robins), Trimmer's most popular work, was first published in 1786, and remained in print until the beginning of the 20th century. It tells the story of two families, a robin family and a human family, who learn to live together congenially. Most importantly, the human children and the baby robins must learn to adopt virtue and to shun vice. For Trimmer, practising kindness to animals as a child would hopefully lead one to "universal benevolence" as an adult. According to Samuel Pickering, Jr., a scholar of 18th-century children's literature, "in its depiction of 18th-century attitudes toward animals, Mrs. Trimmer's Fabulous Histories was the most representative children's book of the period". The text expresses most of the themes that would come to dominate Trimmer's later works, such as her emphasis on retaining social hierarchies; as Tess Cosslett, a scholar of children's literature explains, "the notion of hierarchy that underpins Fabulous Histories is relatively stable and fixed. Parents are above children in terms of authority, and humans above animals, in terms both of dominion and compassion: poor people should be fed before hungry animals... [but] the hierarchical relation of men and women is not so clearly enforced." Moira Ferguson, a scholar of the 18th and 19th centuries, places these themes in a larger historical context, arguing that "the fears of the author and her class about an industrial revolution in ascendance and its repercussions are evident. Hence, [the] text attacks cruelty to birds and animals while affirming British aggression abroad... The text subtly opts for conservative solutions: maintenance of order and established values, resignation and compliance from the poor at home, expatriation for foreigners who do not assimilate easily." A second overarching theme in the text is rationality; Trimmer expresses the common fear of the power of fiction in her preface, explaining to her childish readers that her fable is not real and that animals cannot really speak. Like many social critics during the 18th century, Trimmer was concerned about fiction's potentially damaging impact on young readers. With the rise of the novel and its concomitant private reading, there was a great fear that young people and especially women would read racy and adventurous stories without the knowledge of their parents and, perhaps even more worrisome, interpret the books as they pleased. Trimmer therefore always referred to her text as Fabulous Histories and never as The Story of the Robins in order to emphasize its reality; moreover, she did not allow the book to be illustrated within her lifetime—pictures of talking birds would only have reinforced the paradox of the book (it was fiction parading as a history). Yarde has also speculated that most of the characters in the text are drawn from Trimmer's own acquaintances and family.

=== The Guardian of Education ===
Later in her life, Trimmer published the influential Guardian of Education (June 1802 – September 1806), which included ideas for instructing children and reviews of contemporary children's books. Although one previous attempt had been made to regularly review children's books in Britain, according to Matthew Grenby, "it was a far less substantial and sustained enterprise than Trimmer's". The Guardian included not only reviews of children's books but also extracts from texts Trimmer thought would edify her adult readers. She aimed "to assess the current state of educational policy and praxis in Britain and to shape its future direction". To do so, she evaluated the educational theories of Jean-Jacques Rousseau, John Locke, Mary Wollstonecraft, Hannah More, Madame de Genlis, Joseph Lancaster, and Andrew Bell, among others. In her "Essay on Christian Education," also published separately later, she proposed her own comprehensive educational program.

Trimmer took her reviewing very seriously and her over 400 reviews constitute a set of distinct values. As Grenby puts it, "her initial questions of any children's books that came before her were always first, was it damaging to religion and second, was it damaging to political loyalty and the established social hierarchy". Religion was always Trimmer's first priority and her emphasis on Biblical inerrancy illustrates her fundamentalism. She criticized books that included scenes of death, characters who were insane, and representations of sexuality, as well as books that might frighten children.

Trimmer's fundamentalism, Grenby argues, does not necessarily mark her as the rigid thinker that many critics have presumed her to be. Grenby points out that Trimmer, like Rousseau, believed children were naturally good; in this, she was arguing against centuries of tradition, particularly Puritanical attitudes towards raising children. She also agreed with "Rousseau's key idea [while ironically attacking Rousseau's works themselves], later taken up by the Romantics, that children should not be forced to become adults too early". Trimmer praised the works of several Rousseau-inspired writers, such as Maria Edgeworth and Thomas Day.

The Guardian of Education established children's literature as a genre with her reviews. Moreover, in one of her early essays, "Observations on the Changes which have taken place in Books for Children and Young Persons", Trimmer wrote the first history of children's literature, setting out the first canon of children's literature. Its landmark books are still cited today by scholars as important in the development of the genre.

==== Fairy tales ====
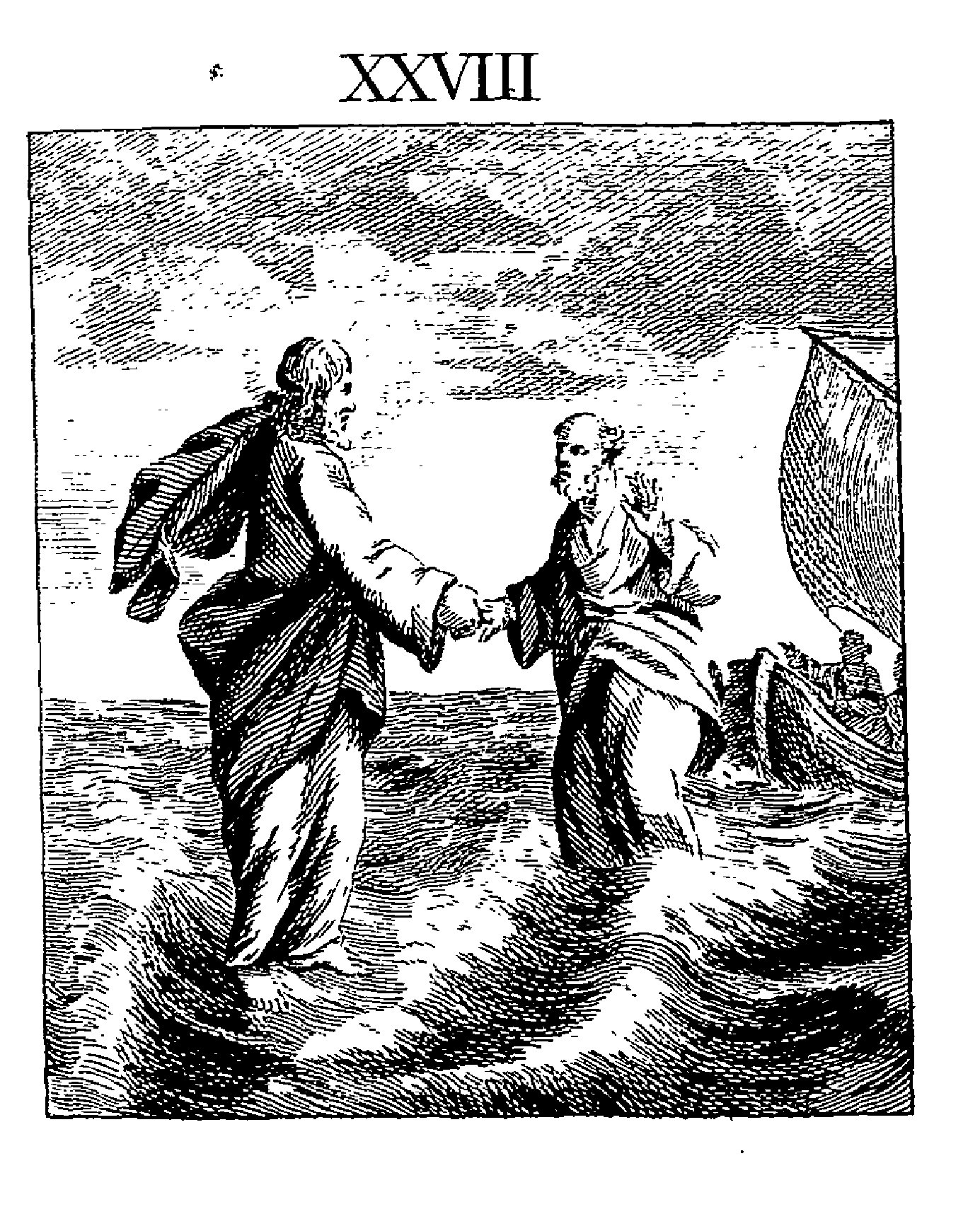
From Trimmer's A Description of a Set of Prints Taken from the New Testament: "Jesus spake unto them, saying, It is I, be not afraid. And Peter answered and said Lord, if it be thou, bid me come to thee on the water: and he said, Come. And when Peter was come out of the ship, he (through the power of CHRIST) walked on the water likewise; but when he saw the wind boisterous, his faith or belief in CHRIST'S power, failed, he was afraid, and beginning to sink, he cried out, Lord, save me! And immediately JESUS stretched forth his hand and caught him, saying, O thou of little faith, wherefore didst thou doubt?"

Trimmer is perhaps most famous now for her condemnation of fairy tales, such as the various translations of Charles Perrault's Histoires ou contes du temps passé (originally published in 1697), because they endorsed an irrational view of the world and suggested that children could become successful too easily (in other words, they did not have to work). Chapbooks were the literature of the poor and Trimmer was attempting to separate children's literature from texts she associated with the lower classes; she also feared that children might gain access to this cheap literature without their parents' knowledge. Trimmer criticized the values associated with fairy tales, accusing them of perpetuating superstition and unfavourable images of stepparents. Rather than seeing Trimmer as a censor of fairy tales, therefore, Nicholas Tucker has argued, "by considering fairy tales as fair game for criticism rather than unthinking worship, Mrs Trimmer is at one with scholars today who have also written critically about the ideologies found in some individual stories".

One of the reasons Trimmer believed fairy tales were dangerous was because they led child readers into a fantasy world where adults could not follow and control their exposure to harmful experiences. She was just as horrified by the graphic illustrations included with some fairy tale collections, complaining that "little children, whose minds are susceptible of every impression; and who from the liveliness of their imaginations are apt to convert into realities whatever forcibly strikes their fancy" should not be allowed to see such scenes as Blue Beard hacking his wife's head off.

==== French Revolution and religion ====
In the pages of The Guardian of Education, Trimmer denounced the French Revolution and the philosophers whose works she believed underpinned it, particularly Jean-Jacques Rousseau. She argued that there was a vast conspiracy, organized by the atheistic and democratic revolutionaries of France, to overthrow the legitimate governments of Europe. These conspirators were attempting to overturn traditional society by "endeavouring to infect the minds of the rising generation, through the medium of Books of Education and Children's Books" (emphasis Trimmer's). Her views were shaped by Abbé Barruel's Memoirs Illustrating the History of Jacobinism (1797–98) (she extracted large sections from this text into the Guardian itself) but also by her fears of the ongoing wars between France and Britain during the 1790s. Trimmer emphasized Christianity above all in her writings and maintained that one should turn to God in times of trial. As M. Nancy Cutt argues in her book on children's literature, Trimmer and writers like her "claimed emphatically that the degree of human happiness was in direct proportion to the degree of submission to the divine Will. Thus they repudiated the moralists' view that learning should exalt reason and work to the temporal happiness of the individual, which was governed by the best interests of society". Trimmer and her allies contended that French pedagogical theories led to an immoral nation, specifically, "deism, infidelity and revolution".

=== Bell vs. Lancasterian school system debate ===
In 1789, Andrew Bell invented the Madras system of education to order to instruct British subjects in India; it was a disciplinary system which employed a hierarchy of student monitors and very few teachers (economical for the colonies, Bell argued). He published a book, Experiment in Education (1797), in order to explain his system, one that he thought could be adapted for the poor in England (in it he endorsed many of Trimmer's own books). A year after reading the Experiment, an English Quaker, Joseph Lancaster, adopted many of its principles for his school in London and then published his own book, Improvements in Education (1803), which repeated many of Bell's ideas. Because of his Quaker sympathies, Lancaster did not encourage the teaching of the doctrines of the Established Church. Trimmer, appalled by the suggestion that British children did not need to be brought up within the Established Church, wrote and published her Comparative View of the two systems in 1805, creating a schism between two very similar systems. According to F. J. Harvey Darton, an early scholar of children's literature, "her effect upon English education... was very considerable, even extraordinary. The two rival systems, Bell's and Lancaster's, were hotly debated all over the country, and the war between Bell and the Dragon, as a cartoonist labelled it, raged in all the magazines, even in the Edinburgh Review." Out of the debate "arose the two great societies – the National Society for Promoting the Education of the Children of the Poor in the Principles of the Established Church, and the British and Foreign School Society – upon whose work, fundamentally, the whole of [Britain's] later elementary school system was based".

== Death ==
How large the debt of gratitude I owe,
How was I counsell'd, aided, prais'd and lov'd.
Let others tell, (for as the words of truth
'Tis told where'er Britannia's name is known)
Thy apostolic ministry to youth,
Thy faithful service to the Church and Throne.
'Tis mine, receiv'd within the social hall,
The hidden gems of virtue to record;
A genius pure from envy's tainting gall,
Meek in reproach, and careless of reward...
For seventy years thy lamp benignly shone,
And thousands hail'd it as a guiding star.

— Jane West

Trimmer's husband died in 1792; this affected her quite deeply, as is evidenced in her journal. In 1800, she and some of her daughters were forced to move to another house in Brentford. This was painful for Trimmer, who wrote in her diary:

Alas, a widow, unacquainted with the ways of the world, ignorant of legal matters, can do but little on occasions like these which now occur. After more than thirty years' residence in a house, in which I have known many comforts, and in a neighbourhood where I have endeavoured to make myself respected, I am likely to be obliged to seek for a new habitation; and there is not one within so short a distance as to enable me to fulfil the wishes of my heart by attending to the schools. Should I find it necessary to change my abode, the schools will, I fear, unavoidably decline. I shall also be removed to a distance, from some of my children, whose society would comfort my declining years.

She died in Brentford on 15 December 1810, and was buried at St Mary's, Ealing. There is a plaque memorializing her at St. George's, Brentford:

To the memory of SARAH relict of James Trimmer, resident in this parish nearly 50 years, during which she adorned the doctrine of God our Saviour in all things, by her practice a constant attendant in God's House of Prayer. In her own house an example to Christian Matrons, in her neighbourhood ministering to the necessities of all; the destitute, the afflicted and the ignorant, seeking their moral improvement by imparting Christian instruction both in private and also in the Church School raised by her exertions and fostered by her care. By her writings, edifying the members of that branch of Christ's Holy Church in which she was born and which she loved with an ardent but well tempered zeal. She obtained rest from her labours on 15 December 1810 in the seventieth year of her age.

== Reception and legacy ==
Trimmer's most popular book, Fabulous Histories, was reprinted for at least 133 years and had a profound impact on generations of readers and writers. In 1877, when the firm of Griffith and Farran published it as part of their "Original Juvenile Library," they advertised it as "the delicious story of Dicksy, Flapsy, and Pecksy, who can have forgotten it? It is as fresh today as it was half a century ago." Tess Cosslett has also suggested that the names of Trimmer's birds—Dicksy, Pecksy, Flapsy and Robin—bear a striking resemblance to the rabbits—Flopsy, Mopsy, Cottontail and Peter—in Beatrix Potter's children's books.

Trimmer also influenced the children's writers of her own age; William Godwin's Fables, Ancient and Modern (1805), for example, imitates Trimmer's Ladder to Learning. Among her contemporary admirers was Frances Burney, who remarked in a letter to her sister Esther about the education of the latter's 10-year-old daughter, "Mrs. Trimmer I should suppose admirable for a girl" (as an introduction to the Scriptures).

While Trimmer was highly respected for her charity work during her lifetime and for her books long after her death, her reputation began to wane at the end of the 19th century and plummeted during the 20th century. One reason for this is that her textbooks, so widely used during the first half of the century, were replaced by secular books in the second half of the century. The tone of her books was no longer seen as consonant with British society. An early scholar of children's literature, Geoffrey Summerfield, describes her this way: "Of all the morally shrill women active in the late 18th and early 19th centuries, she was probably the shrillest. Unbalanced, frenetic, paranoid, she may have been, but no one could deny her energy and perseverance in defending the souls of the children of England from the assaults of the devil." Since the 1980s, however, children's literature scholars have attempted to view 18th-century children's literature within its historical context rather than judge it against modern tastes; scholars such as Myers, Grenby, Ruwe, Ferguson, Fyfe and Cosslett have reassessed Trimmer's work. Because Trimmer does not fit the mold of 20th-century feminism—that is, since she did not rebel against the social mores of her society as did Mary Wollstonecraft—she did not attract the attention of early feminist scholars. However, as Ruwe points out, "by the confluence of political, historical, and pedagogical events at the turn of the century, a woman such as Trimmer was able to gain a greater visibility in the realm of public letters than was perhaps typical before or after."

== Trimmer's children ==
Trimmer and her husband had twelve children.

Name	Birth date	Death date	Brief biography
Charlotte	27 August 1763	1836	Charlotte married the widower Richard Moore, great-grandson of Sir Thomas Moore, who was himself a great-nephew of the poet John Milton; they had one daughter, Charlotte Selina (1793–1867). Charlotte Trimmer Moore died from heart failure and gangrene in 1836.
Sarah (Selina)	16 August 1764	1829	Selina was governess to the children of Georgiana, Duchess of Devonshire, and Lady Caroline Lamb.
Juliana Lydia	4 May 1766	1844	Juliana Lydia may have assisted her sister Selina in caring for the children of the Duchess of Devonshire. She continued her mother's philanthropic projects in Brentford.
Joshua Kirby	18 August 1767	17 September 1829	Joshua Kirby married Eliza Willett Thompson in 1794, and had seven children with her. He held several local offices in Brentford and invested in brickfields, a copper mine and a slate quarry. He also built up a flock of merino sheep and exported them to Australia as part of a project initiated by Joseph Banks. His son, Joshua Trimmer (1795–1857), became a geologist of some note. See Greg Finch 'Joshua Kirby Trimmer 1767–1829', Brentford and Chiswick Local History Journal, Vol 19 (2010) pp. 4–7
Elizabeth	21 February 1769	24 April 1816	Elizabeth was frequently ill throughout her life, possibly with consumption. She cared for her nephew James as he was dying and died just a few days before him.
William Kirby	20 June 1770	February 1811	William Kirby married Jane Bayne in 1794, and had seven children with her. He owned a successful brickmaking business and collected fossils. He had a stroke in 1810 and died four months later. Three of his sons, Spencer, Arthur and William took merino sheep to Australia.
Lucy	1 February 1772	1813	Lucy married James Harris in 1799, with whom she had six children. William (1807–48) became a successful soldier with the British East India Company and was knighted by Queen Victoria in 1844; he was also an artist, author, engineer, diplomat, naturalist, geographer and sculptor. Robert (1810–65) became a successful captain in the Royal Navy and designed a curriculum for educating new officers. John (1808–29) joined the army and was killed at age 21 in India. Their daughter Lucy (1802–79) continued her grandmother's philanthropic work for the poor, establishing and running several Sunday schools.
James Rustat	31 July 1773	1843	James Rustat married Sarah Cornwallis in 1802; they had one son, James Cornwallis Trimmer (1803–16). James' wife died a month after giving birth to their son and Sarah Trimmer's daughter, Elizabeth, cared for him. James Rustat Trimmer invested in his family's merino sheep business and was described as "a brick manufacturer, of Clerkenwell" on official documents. He died of senile dementia in 1843.
John	26 February 1775	1791	John died of consumption at age fifteen.
Edward Decimus	3 January 1777	1777	Edward lived for only a few days.
Henry Scott	1 August 1778	25 November 1859	Henry Scott was ill with consumption in 1792–3. He married Mary Driver Syer in 1805; together they had three sons. He was close friends with several artists, including J. M. W. Turner and Henry Howard (who painted his mother's portrait) and was vicar at Heston from 1804 until his death in 1859. He prompted an investigation into the death of Private Frederick John White who had been court-martialed and flogged for insubordination. His son Barrington (1809–60) became his curate at Heston for 27 years and eventually domestic chaplain to the Duke of Sutherland, who was connected to Georgiana, Duchess of Devonshire's family; he was also a writer. His son Frederick (1813–83) became a wealthy landowner in Heston and served as justice of the peace.
Annabella	26 December 1780	1785	

== List of works ==
This list of works has been taken from Deborah Wills' entry on Trimmer in the Dictionary of Literary Biography. Other entries have been added if they appear in other academic articles or database collections under Trimmer's name.

- An Easy Introduction to the Knowledge of Nature, and Reading the Holy Scriptures, adapted to the Capacities of Children (1780)
- Sacred history, selected from the Scriptures; with annotations and reflections, particularly calculated to facilitate the study of the Holy Scriptures in schools and families (1782–85) (6 volumes)
- The Œconomy of Charity (1786)
- Fabulous Histories; Designed for the Instruction of Children, Respecting their Treatment of Animals (1786)
- A Description of a Set of Prints of Scripture History: Contained in a Set of Easy Lessons (1786)
- A Description of a Set of Prints of Ancient History: Contained in a Set of Easy Lessons. In Two Parts (1786)
- The Servant's Friend (1786)
- The Two Farmers (1787)
- The Œconomy of Charity (1787)
- The Sunday-School Catechist, Consisting of Familiar Lectures, with Questions (1788)
- The Sunday-scholar's Manual (1788)
- The Family Magazine (1788–89) (periodical)
- A Comment on Dr. Watts's Divine Songs for Children with Questions (1789)
- A Description of a Set of Prints of Roman History, Contained in a Set of Easy Lessons (1789)
- The Ladder of Learning, Step the First (1789)
- A Description of a Set of Prints Taken from the New Testament, Contained in a Set of Easy Lessons (1790)
- Easy Lessons for Young Children (c.1790) [not on Wills' list]
- Sunday School Dialogues (1790) (edited by Trimmer)
- A Companion to the Book of Common Prayer (1791)
- An Explanation of the Office for the Public Baptism of Infants (1791)
- An Attempt to Familiarize the Catechism of the Church of England (1791)
- The Little Spelling Book for Young Children (4th ed., 1791) [not on Wills' list]
- Reflections upon the Education of Children in Charity Schools (1792)
- A Friendly Remonstrance, concerning the Christian Covenant and the Sabbath Day; Intended for the Good of the Poor (1792)
- The Ladder of Learning, Step the Second (1792)
- A Description of a Set of Prints of English History, Contained in a Set of Easy Lessons (1792)
- An Abridgement of Scripture History; Consisting of Lessons Selected from the Old Testament (1792)
- A Scriptures Catechism (1797) (2 parts) [not on Wills' list]
- A Description of a Set of Prints Taken from the Old Testament (c.1797) [not on Willis' list]
- The Silver Thimble (1799)
- An Address to Heads of Schools and Families (1799?)
- The Charity School Spelling Book (c.1799) (2 parts)
- The Teacher's Assistant: Consisting of Lectures in the Catechised Form (1800)
- A Geographical Companion to Mrs. Trimmer's Scripture, Antient, and English Abridged Histories, with Prints (1802)
- A Help to the Unlearned in the Study of the Holy Scriptures (1805)
- An Abridgement of the New Testament (1805?)
- A Comparative View of the New Plan of Education Promulgated by Mr. Joseph Lancaster (1805)
- The Guardian of Education (1802–06) (periodical)
- A New Series of Prints, Accompanied by Easy Lessons; Being an Improved Edition of the First Set of Scripture Prints from the Old Testament (1808)
- A Concise History of England (1808)
- Instructive Tales: Collected from the Family Magazine (1810)
- Sermons, for Family Reading (1811) (posthumous)
- An Essay on Christian Education (1812) (posthumous)
- Some Account of the Life and Writings of Mrs. Trimmer (1814) (posthumous)
- A Description of a Set of Prints of the History of France, Contained in a Set of Easy Lessons (1815) (posthumous)
- A Selection from Mrs. Trimmer's Instructive Tales; The Good Nurse... (1815) (posthumous)
- Miscellaneous Pieces, Selected from the Family Magazine (1818) (posthumous)
- Prayers and Meditations Extracted from the Journal of the Late Mrs. Trimmer (1818) (posthumous)
- A Selection from Mrs. Trimmer's Instructive Tales; The Rural Economists... (1819) (posthumous)

== Bibliography ==
- Avery, Gillian. Childhood's Pattern: A study of the heroes and heroines of children's fiction 1770–1950. London: Hodder and Stoughton, 1975. ISBN 0-340-16945-1.
- Balfour, Clara Lucas. "Mrs. Trimmer." Working Women of the Last Half Century: The Lesson of their Lives. London: W. and F. G. Cash, 1856.
- Cosslett, Tess. "Fabulous Histories and Papillonades." Talking Animals in British Children's Fiction, 1786–1914. Burlington, VT: Ashgate, 2006. ISBN 0-7546-3656-9.
- Cutt, Margaret Nancy. Ministering Angels: A Study of Nineteenth-century Evangelical Writing for Children. Wormley: Five Owls Press, 1979.
- Darton, F. J. Harvey. Children's Books in England: Five Centuries of Social Life. 3rd ed. Revised by Brian Alderson. Cambridge: Cambridge University Press, 1982. ISBN 0-521-24020-4.
- Ferguson, Moira. "Sarah Trimmer's Warring Worlds." Animal Advocacy and Englishwomen, 1780–1900: Patriots, Nation, and Empire. Ann Arbor: University of Michigan Press, 1998. ISBN 0-472-10874-3.
- Fyfe, Aileen. "Reading Children's Books in Late Eighteenth-Century Dissenting Families." The Historical Journal 43.2 (2000): 453–473.
- Grenby, M.O. "'A Conservative Woman Doing Radical Things': Sarah Trimmer and The Guardian of Education." Culturing the Child, 1690–1914. Ed. Donelle Ruwe. Lanham, MD: Scarecrow Press, 2005. ISBN 0-8108-5182-2.
- Grenby, Matthew. "Introduction." The Guardian of Education. Bristol: Thoemmes Press, 2002. ISBN 1-84371-011-0.
- Heath, Pauline. "Mrs Trimmer's Plan of Appropriate Instruction: a revisionist view of her textbooks." History of Education 32.4 (2003): 385–400.
- Heath, Pauline. The Works of Mrs. Trimmer. LAP Lambert Academic Publishing, 2010. ISBN 978-3-8383-2458-6.
- Immel, Andrea. Revolutionary Reviewing: Sarah Trimmer's Guardian of Education and the Cultural Political of Juvenile Literature. An Index to The Guardian. Los Angeles: Dept. of Special Collections, UCLA, 1990. [ISBN unspecified].
- Jackson, Mary V. Engines of Instruction, Mischief, and Magic: Children's Literature in England from Its Beginnings to 1839. Lincoln: University of Nebraska Press, 1989. ISBN 0-8032-7570-6.
- Keutsch, Wilfried. "Teaching the Poor: Sarah Trimmer, God's Own Handmaiden." Bulletin of the John Rylands University Library of Manchester 76.3 (1994): 43–57.
- Laqueur, Thomas Walter. Religion and Respectability: Sunday Schools and Working Class Culture, 1780–1850. New Haven: Yale University Press, 1976. ISBN 0-300-01859-2.
- O'Malley, Andrew. The Making of the Modern Child: Children's Literature in the Late Eighteenth Century. Routledge, 2003. ISBN 9780415514682.
- Pickering, Jr., Samuel F. John Locke and Children's Books in Eighteenth-Century England. Knoxville: The University of Tennessee Press, 1981. ISBN 0-87049-290-X.
- Rodgers, Betsy. "Schools of Industry: Mrs. Trimmer." Cloak of Charity: Studies in Eighteenth-Century Philanthropy. London: Methuen and Co., 1949. OCLC 967508
- Rowe, Karen E. "Virtue in the Guise of Vice: The Making and Unmaking of Morality from Fairy Tale Fantasy." Culturing the Child, 1690–1914: Essays in Memory of Mitzi Myers. Ed. Donelle Ruwe. Lanham, MD: The Children's Literature Association and the Scarecrow Press, Inc., 2005. ISBN 0-8108-5182-2.
- Ruwe, Donelle. "Guarding the British Bible from Rousseau: Sarah Trimmer, William Godwin, and the Pedagogical Periodical." Children's Literature 29 (2001): 1–17.
- Schnorrenberg, Barbara Brandon. "Sarah Trimmer." Oxford Dictionary of National Biography. Retrieved on 21 February 2007. (by subscription only)
- Summerfield, Geoffrey. Fantasy and Reason: Children's Literature in the Eighteenth Century. Athens: The University of Georgia Press, 1984. ISBN 0-416-35780-6.
- Trimmer, Sarah. The Guardian of Education. Bristol: Thoemmes Press, 2002. ISBN 1-84371-011-0.
- Trimmer, Sarah. Some Account of the Life and Writings of Mrs. Trimmer. [Ed. Henry Scott Trimmer.] 3rd ed. London: C. & J. Rivington, 1825. Retrieved on 19 April 2007.
- Tucker, Nicholas. "Fairy Tales and Their Early Opponents: In Defence of Mrs Trimmer." Opening the Nursery Door: Reading, Writing and Childhood, 1600–1900. Eds. Mary Hilton, Morag Styles and Victor Watson. London: Routledge, 1997. ISBN 0-415-14898-7.
- Wills, Deborah. "Sarah Trimmer." Dictionary of Literary Biography. Vol. 158: 340–348.
- Wills, Deborah. "Sarah Trimmer's Œconomy of Charity: Politics and Morality in the Sunday School State." Lumen 12 (1993): 157–66.
- Yarde, D.M. The Life and Works of Sarah Trimmer, a Lady of Brentford. Middlesex: The Hounslow District Historical Society, 1972. A 1971 printing has the ISBN 0-903254-00-X.
- Yarde, D.M. Sarah Trimmer of Brentford and Her Children with Some of Her Early Writings, 1780–1786. Middlesex: Hounslow and District Historical Society, 1990. OCLC 24722374
