= The Guardian of Education =

Defunct British children's literature review magazine

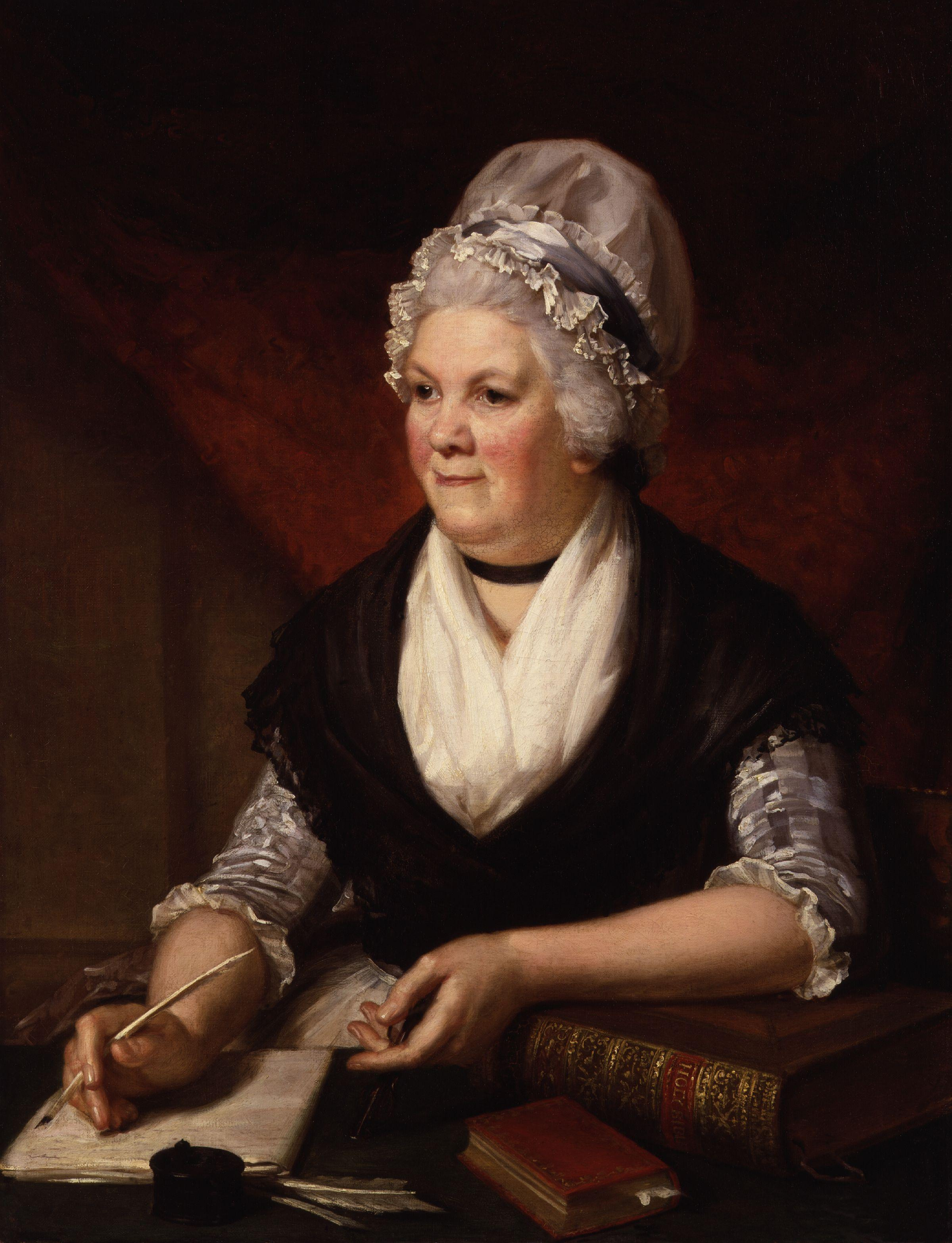
Sarah Trimmer, editor of The Guardian of Education, painted by Henry Howard in 1798

The Guardian of Education was the first successful periodical dedicated to reviewing children's literature in Britain. It was edited by 18th-century educationalist, children's author, and Sunday school advocate Sarah Trimmer and was published from June 1802 until September 1806 by J. Hatchard and F. C. and J. Rivington. The journal offered child-rearing advice and assessments of contemporary educational theories, and Trimmer even proffered her own educational theory after evaluating the major works of the day.

Fearing the influence of French Revolutionary ideals, particularly those of philosopher Jean-Jacques Rousseau, Trimmer emphasized orthodox Anglicanism and encouraged the perpetuation of the contemporary social and political order. Despite her conservatism, however, she agreed with Rousseau and other progressive educational reformers on many issues, such as the damaging effects of rote learning and the irrationalism of fairy tales.

The Guardian of Education was the first periodical to review children's books seriously and with a distinctive set of criteria. Trimmer's reviews were carefully thought out; they influenced publishers and authors to alter the content of their books, helped to define the new genre of children's literature, and greatly affected the sales of children's books. The Guardian also offered the first history of children's literature, establishing a list of landmark books, which scholars still use today.

== Founding and structure ==
Sarah Trimmer was prompted to publish The Guardian of Education by the flood of new children's books on the market early in the nineteenth century and by her fear that those books might contain French Revolutionary values. The 1790s had been one of the most tumultuous decades in Europe's history, with the French Revolution, increased demands for reform in Britain, and the French Revolutionary Wars. Following this upsurge in radicalism, a conservative backlash erupted in Britain; the Guardian was, in many ways, a part of this movement. In its pages, Trimmer denounced the Revolution and the philosophers whose works she believed were responsible for it, particularly Jean-Jacques Rousseau. She argued that there existed a vast conspiracy, organized by the atheistic and democratic revolutionaries of France, to undermine and overthrow the legitimate governments of Europe. From her perspective, the conspirators were attempting to overturn traditional society by "endeavouring to infect the minds of the rising generation, through the medium of Books of Education and Children's Books" [emphasis Trimmer's]. She intended to combat this conspiracy by pointing parents towards properly Christian books.

Each issue of Trimmer's Guardian was divided into three sections:

1. Extracts from texts which Trimmer thought would edify her adult readers (grouped under "Memoirs" and "Extracts from Sermons").
2. An essay by Trimmer commenting on educational issues (contained in sections such as "Original Essays" and "Systems of Education Examined").
3. Reviews of children's books.

Trimmer herself wrote all of the essays listed under her name and all of the reviews, but she was not the author of the texts she extracted. The issues did not always consist of the same sections; for example, beginning in 1804 Trimmer started including an "Essay on Christian Education" and in 1805 occasionally reviewed "School books". Beginning a tradition that persists to this day, she divided the books she reviewed by age group: "Examination of Books for Children" (for those under fourteen) and "Books for Young Persons" (for those between fourteen and twenty-one).

Matthew Grenby, the foremost expert on Trimmer, estimates that the Guardian's circulation was between 1,500 and 3,500 copies per issue. Thus the Guardian's circulation was probably comparable to political periodicals such as the Tory Critical Review and the British Critic, which both reached 3,500 by 1797, or the Analytical Review, which reached about 1,500, but not to the Monthly Review, which reached approximately 5,000. From June 1802 until January 1804, the Guardian appeared monthly; from then until it ceased publication in September 1806, it was issued quarterly. There were 28 issues in all.

Trimmer undertook a challenging task in publishing her periodical. According to Grenby, she aimed "to assess the current state of educational policy and praxis in Britain and to shape its future direction". In her "Essay on Christian Education", subsequently published separately as a pamphlet, she proposed her own comprehensive educational program.

== Reviewing criteria and values ==
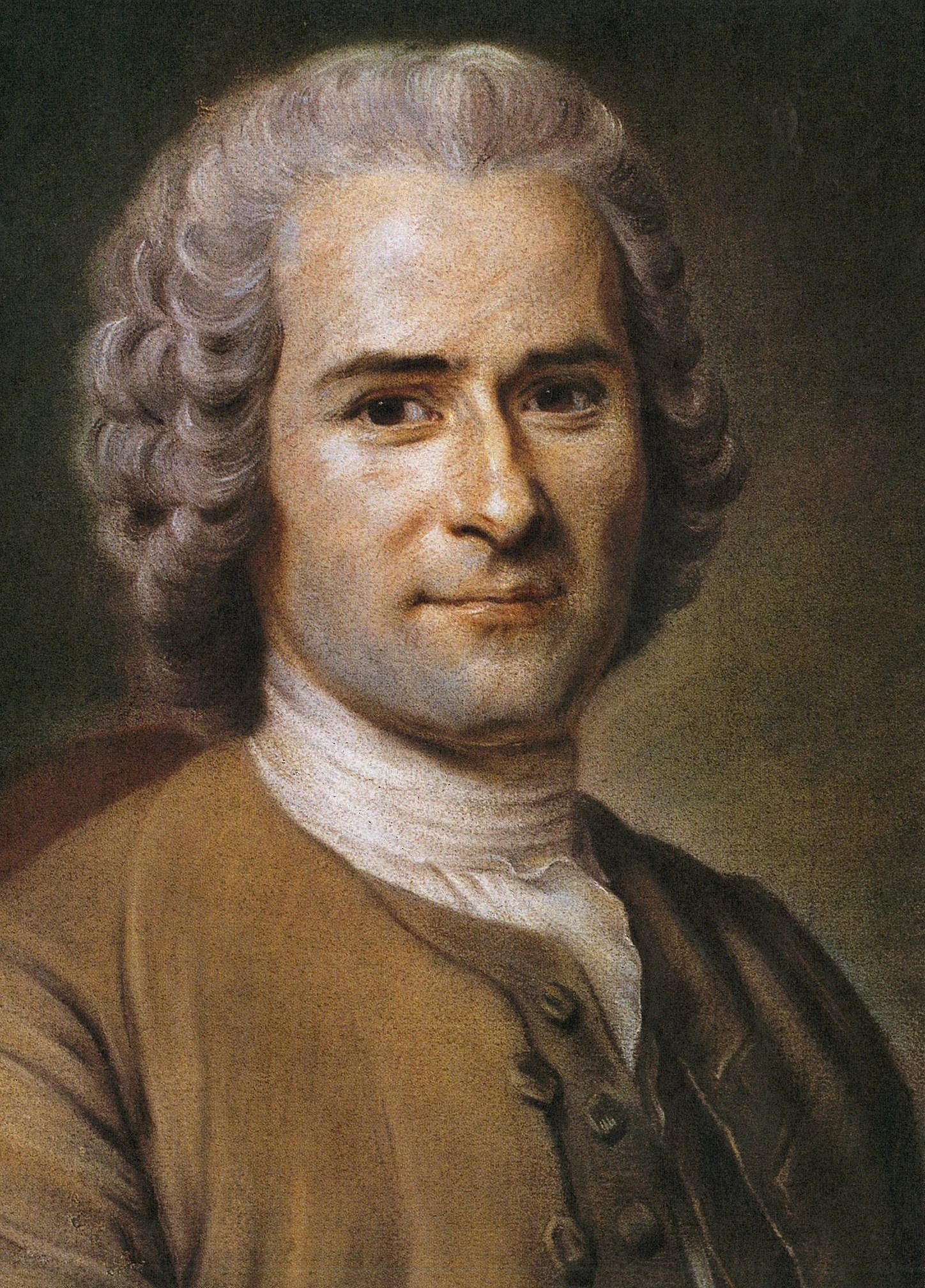
Jean-Jacques Rousseau, author of Emile (1762), one of the most influential books of educational philosophy in the eighteenth century

The Guardian of Education was the first periodical to take the reviewing of children's books seriously. Trimmer's over four hundred reviews constituted a set of distinct and identifiable criteria regarding what was valuable in this new genre. As a high-church Anglican, she was intent on protecting Christianity from secularism as well as evangelicalism, particularly as the latter manifested itself in Methodism. Her reviews also reveal her to be a staunch monarchist and opponent of the French Revolution. As Grenby puts it, "her initial questions of any children's books that came before her were always first, was it damaging to religion and second, was it damaging to political loyalty and the established social hierarchy". Religion was Trimmer's first priority and her emphasis on the doctrine of Biblical inerrancy illustrated her fundamentalism. She wrote to a friend: "I will only say, that the more I reflect on the subject, the more I am convinced that it is not right to supersede the figurative style in which they speak of God and divine things, my opinion is, that whoever attempts to teach the truths of divine revelation, should follow the method of the inspired writers as nearly as possible" [emphasis Trimmer's]. For Trimmer, the truth of the Bible was not only in its content, but also in its style, and some of her harshest reviews were written against texts that altered both the style and the substance of the Bible.

Trimmer's fundamentalism, Grenby argues, does not necessarily mark her as a rigid thinker. Grenby points out that Trimmer, like Rousseau, believed children were naturally good. In this view, she was arguing against centuries of tradition, particularly Puritanical attitudes towards raising children (exemplified in the doctrine of original sin). Although she attacked Rousseau's works, Grenby argues that she agreed with "Rousseau's key idea, later taken up by the Romantics, that children should not be forced to become adults too early", in particular that they should not be exposed to political issues too soon. Trimmer also maintained that mothers and fathers should share the responsibility of caring for the family. Like the progressive educational reformers and children's authors Maria Edgeworth and Thomas Day and even Rousseau himself, Trimmer opposed rote learning and advocated flexible and conversational lessons that encouraged critical thinking in children. She also promoted breastfeeding (a controversial position at the time) and parental involvement in childhood education.

In his analysis of her reviews, Grenby comes to the conclusion "Trimmer was ... not nearly so vitriolic in her reviewing as her reputation suggests.... fewer than 50 [of the reviews] were chiefly negative, and of these only 18 were thoroughly excoriating. These were easily outweighed by the positive notices, although most of her reviews were mixed or – more surprisingly given her reputation for always impassioned appraisal – ambivalent." She objected primarily to texts that altered the Bible, such as William Godwin's Bible Stories (1802), and secondarily to books that promoted ideas she associated with the French Revolution. She also criticized the inclusion of scenes of death, characters who were insane, and representations of sexuality, as well as books that might frighten children. She typically praises books that encourage intellectual instruction, such as Anna Barbauld's Lessons for Children (1778–79).

=== Fairy tales ===
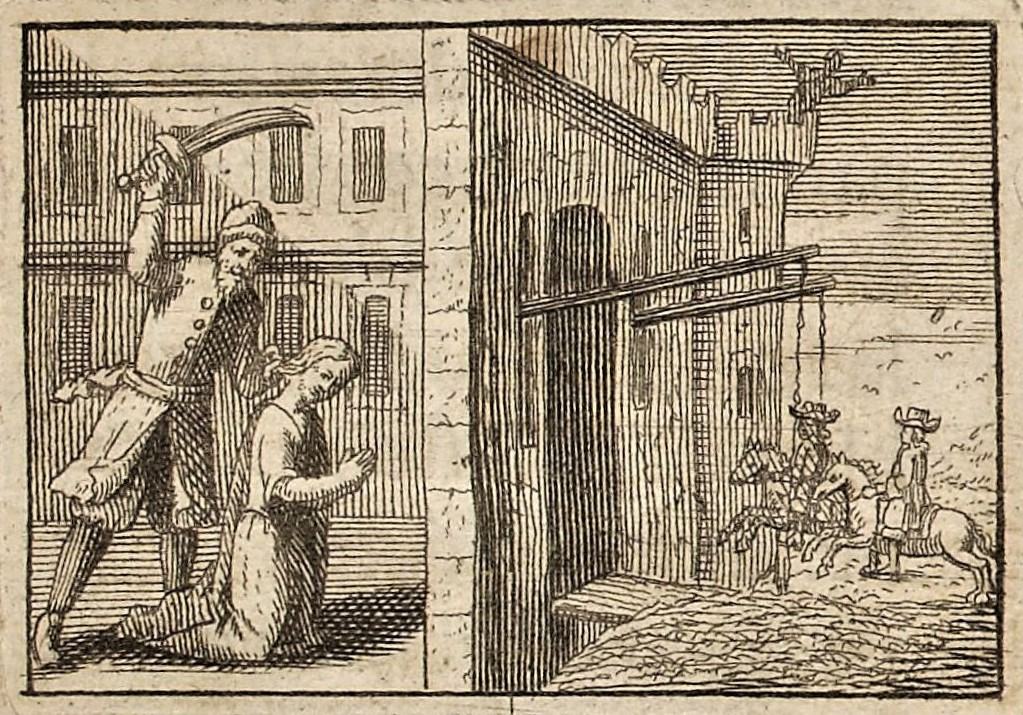
Trimmer opposed graphic illustrations, such as this one of "Blue Beard" from the 1697 French edition of Perrault's tales.

Trimmer is perhaps most famous now for her condemnation of fairy tales, such as the various translations of Charles Perrault's Histoires ou Contes du Temps passé (1697). She disliked fairy tales because they endorsed an irrational view of the world and success without work. Trimmer's view of fairy tales, although often ridiculed by modern critics, was widespread at the end of the eighteenth century, in part because most educators accepted John Locke's theory that the mind was a tabula rasa and therefore particularly sensitive to impressions early in life. Trimmer was opposed to fairy tales that were not grounded in reality and which would "excite an unregulated sensibility" in the reader. Without a proper moral or a moralizing narrator, fairy tales could lead a reader astray. Above all, she was concerned about "unmediated", unknown, and unsupervised feelings in the child reader. One of the reasons Trimmer believed fairy tales were dangerous was because they led child readers into a fantasy world where adults could not follow and control their exposure to harmful experiences. She was just as horrified by the graphic illustrations included with some fairy tale collections, complaining that "little children, whose minds are susceptible of every impression; and who from the liveliness of their imaginations are apt to convert into realities whatever forcibly strikes their fancy" should not be allowed to see such scenes as Blue Beard hacking his wife's head off.

Fairy tales were often found in chapbooks—cheap, disposable literature—which contained sensational stories such as Jack the Giant Killer along with lewder tales such as How to restore a lost Maidenhead, or solder a Crackt one. Chapbooks were the literature of the poor and Trimmer attempted to separate children's literature from texts she associated with the lower classes. Trimmer criticized the values associated with fairy tales, accusing them of perpetuating irrationality, superstition, and unfavorable images of stepparents. Rather than seeing Trimmer as a censor of fairy tales, therefore, children's literature scholar Nicholas Tucker has argued, "by considering fairy tales as fair game for criticism rather than unthinking worship, Mrs Trimmer is at one with scholars today who have also written critically about the ideologies found in some individual stories".

=== French Revolution and religion ===
Trimmer's views of the French philosophes were shaped by Abbé Barruel's Memoirs Illustrating the History of Jacobinism (1797–98) (she extracted large sections from this text into the Guardian itself) but also by her fears of the ongoing wars between France and Britain during the 1790s. Trimmer emphasized Christianity above all in her writings and maintained that one should to turn to God in times of trial. As children's literature scholar M. Nancy Cutt argues, Trimmer and writers like her "claimed emphatically that the degree of human happiness was in direct proportion to the degree of submission to the divine Will. Thus they repudiated the moralists' view that learning should exalt reason and work to the temporal happiness of the individual, which was governed by the best interests of society." Trimmer and her allies contended that French pedagogical theories led to an immoral nation, specifically, "deism, infidelity and revolution".

== Reception and legacy ==
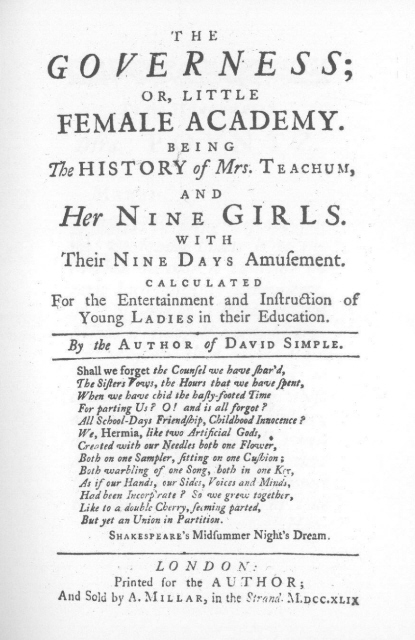
Title page from Sarah Fielding's The Governess, or The Little Female Academy (1749), cited by Trimmer as a landmark in the history of children's literature

Although one previous attempt had been made to regularly review British children's books it was not as comprehensive, did not last as long, and was not nearly as influential as Trimmer's Guardian. Grenby suggests, for example, that Godwin changed the name of his Bible Stories to Sacred Histories after Trimmer's attack on it and the publishers of John Newbery's Tom Telescope and the Philosophy of Tops and Balls immediately removed the material Trimmer found offensive. Other scholars have argued that authors wrote with Trimmer's reviewing criteria in mind, one going so far as to call it "a manual for prospective writers". However, Trimmer's reviews were not always heeded; for example, her negative review of the sentimental works of Edward Augustus Kendall, such as Keeper's Travels in Search of His Master, did little to dampen the sales of his works.

With its four hundred reviews, The Guardian of Education, as Grenby writes, "contributed to the establishment of children's literature as a secure, permanent and respectable literary genre". By excluding novels, chapbooks, tracts, ballads, and fairy tales, it effectively decided what counted as children's literature and what did not. Furthermore, in one of her early essays, "Observations on the Changes which have taken place in Books for Children and Young Persons", Trimmer wrote the first history of children's literature. Its landmark books, such as Sarah Fielding's The Governess (1749) and John Newbery's The History of Little Goody Two Shoes (1765), are still cited today by scholars as important in the development of children's literature.

It was not until the last quarter of the nineteenth century, with the publication of the work of children's author and literary critic Charlotte Mary Yonge, that any sustained reviewing or historicizing of children's literature took place again.

== Bibliography ==
- Cutt, Margaret Nancy. Ministering Angels: A Study of Nineteenth-century Evangelical Writing for Children. Wormley: Five Owls Press, 1979. ISBN 0-903838-02-8.
- Darton, F. J. Harvey. Children's Books in England: Five Centuries of Social Life. 3rd ed. Revised by Brian Alderson. Cambridge: Cambridge University Press, 1982. ISBN 0-521-24020-4.
- Grenby, M.O. "'A Conservative Woman Doing Radical Things': Sarah Trimmer and The Guardian of Education". Culturing the Child, 1690–1914. Ed. Donelle Ruwe. Lanham, MD: Scarecrow Press, 2005. ISBN 0-8108-5182-2.
- Grenby, Matthew. "Introduction". The Guardian of Education. Bristol: Thoemmes Press, 2002. ISBN 1-84371-011-0.
- Immel, Andrea. Revolutionary Reviewing: Sarah Trimmer's Guardian of Education and the Cultural Political of Juvenile Literature. An Index to The Guardian. Los Angeles: Dept. of Special Collections, UCLA, 1990. [ISBN unspecified].
- Jackson, Mary V. Engines of Instruction, Mischief, and Magic: Children's Literature in England from Its Beginnings to 1839. Lincoln: University of Nebraska Press, 1989. ISBN 0-8032-7570-6.
- O'Malley, Andrew. The Making of the Modern Child: Children's Literature and Childhood in the Late Eighteenth Century. New York: Routledge, 2003. ISBN 0-415-94299-3.
- Rowe, Karen E. "Virtue in the Guise of Vice: The Making and Unmaking of Morality from Fairy Tale Fantasy". Culturing the Child, 1690–1914: Essays in Memory of Mitzi Myers. Ed. Donelle Ruwe. Lanham, MD: The Children's Literature Association and the Scarecrow Press, Inc., 2005. ISBN 0-8108-5182-2.
- Ruwe, Donelle. "Guarding the British Bible from Rousseau: Sarah Trimmer, William Godwin, and the Pedagogical Periodical". Children's Literature 29 (2001): 1–17.
- Secord, James A. "Newton in the Nursery: Tom Telescope and the Philosophy of Tops and Balls, 1761–1838". History of Science 23 (1985): 127–51.
- Summerfield, Geoffrey. Fantasy and Reason: Children's Literature in the Eighteenth Century. Athens: The University of Georgia Press, 1984. ISBN 0-416-35780-6.
- Trimmer, Sarah. The Guardian of Education. Bristol: Thoemmes Press, 2002. ISBN 1-84371-011-0.
- Trimmer, Sarah. Some Account of the Life and Writings of Mrs. Trimmer. [Ed. Henry Scott Trimmer.] 3rd ed. London: C. & J. Rivington, 1825. Google Books. Retrieved on 19 April 2007.
- Tucker, Nicholas. "Fairy Tales and Their Early Opponents: In Defence of Mrs Trimmer". Opening the Nursery Door: Reading, Writing and Childhood, 1600–1900. Eds. Mary Hilton, Morag Styles and Victor Watson. London: Routledge, 1997. ISBN 0-415-14898-7.
