= Robert Harris (Royal Navy officer, born 1809) =

British Royal Navy captain

Captain Robert Harris
- Born: 9 July 1809
- Died: 16 January 1865 (aged 55)
- Occupation: Royal Navy captain

Robert Harris (9 July 1809 – 16 January 1865) was a British Royal Navy captain.

== Biography ==
Harris son of James Harris of Wittersham Hall, Kent, and, on the mother's side, grandson of Mrs. Trimmer. He was born on 9 July 1809; Sir William Cornwallis Harris was his elder brother. Robert Harris entered the navy in January 1822, and, serving almost continuously in the Mediterranean, was a midshipman of the Euryalus frigate during the little war with Algiers in 1824, and of the Cambrian at the battle of Navarino, 20 October 1827, and when she was wrecked at Carabusa on 31 January 1828. After his return to England early in 1829 he was borne on the books of the Royal George yacht, during which time he was really serving on board the Onyx and Pantaloon, tenders, on the coast of South America, in the West Indies, on the coast of Spain and Portugal, or in the Channel and on the coast of Ireland. On 21 May 1833 he was promoted to the rank of lieutenant, and the following December was appointed to the Excellent, then recently established as a school of gunnery, at Portsmouth, under the command of Captain Thomas Hastings (1790–1870). From her he was appointed in January 1836 to be gunnery-lieutenant of the Melville with Captain Douglas, and, later on, with Richard Saunders Dundas, under whose command he served in China, and was specially promoted to the rank of commander on 8 June 1841 for his services in the Canton river, and particularly at the capture of the Bogue forts on 26 February 1841. During 1842, while on half-pay, he studied at the Royal Naval College at Portsmouth; and from September 1844 to May 1846 commanded the Flying Fish on the west coast of Africa. In March 1848 he was appointed commander of the Ganges in the Channel fleet with Captain Henry Smith, and from her was promoted to the rank of captain on 19 October 1849. In March 1851 he was appointed to the Prince Regent, also in the Channel fleet, as flag-captain to Commodore William Fanshawe Martin, but left her in May 1852 on Martin's being relieved by Rear-admiral Corry. It is interesting to trace these details of his service under such officers as Hastings, Dundas, and Martin, as explaining and illustrating his peculiar fitness for the appointment which he received in January 1854 to the Illustrious, then commissioned as training ship for landsmen entered into the navy, according to a plan of Sir James Graham's, and who consequently became generally known as ‘Jemmy Graham's novices.’ In his discharge of this new and exceptional duty Harris displayed such ability and resource that when, in 1857, it was determined to give effect to a long-mooted scheme for improving the elementary education and training of young officers, the execution of it was entrusted to Harris, in the first instance on board the Illustrious, from which, on 1 Jan. 1859, he and the cadets were moved to the Britannia, then in Portsmouth harbour, but in November 1861 sent to Portland. Harris continued to hold this difficult and important post till October 1862, during which time the system of education of naval cadets took form, and was permanently established on its present basis. He had no further employment, and died at Southsea, 16 January 1865. Harris married in 1843 Priscilla Sophia, daughter of Captain Penruddocke of the Fusilier guards, and left issue a son, Robert Hastings, a captain in the navy, and two daughters.
