= Fabulous Histories =

1786 book by Sarah Trimmer

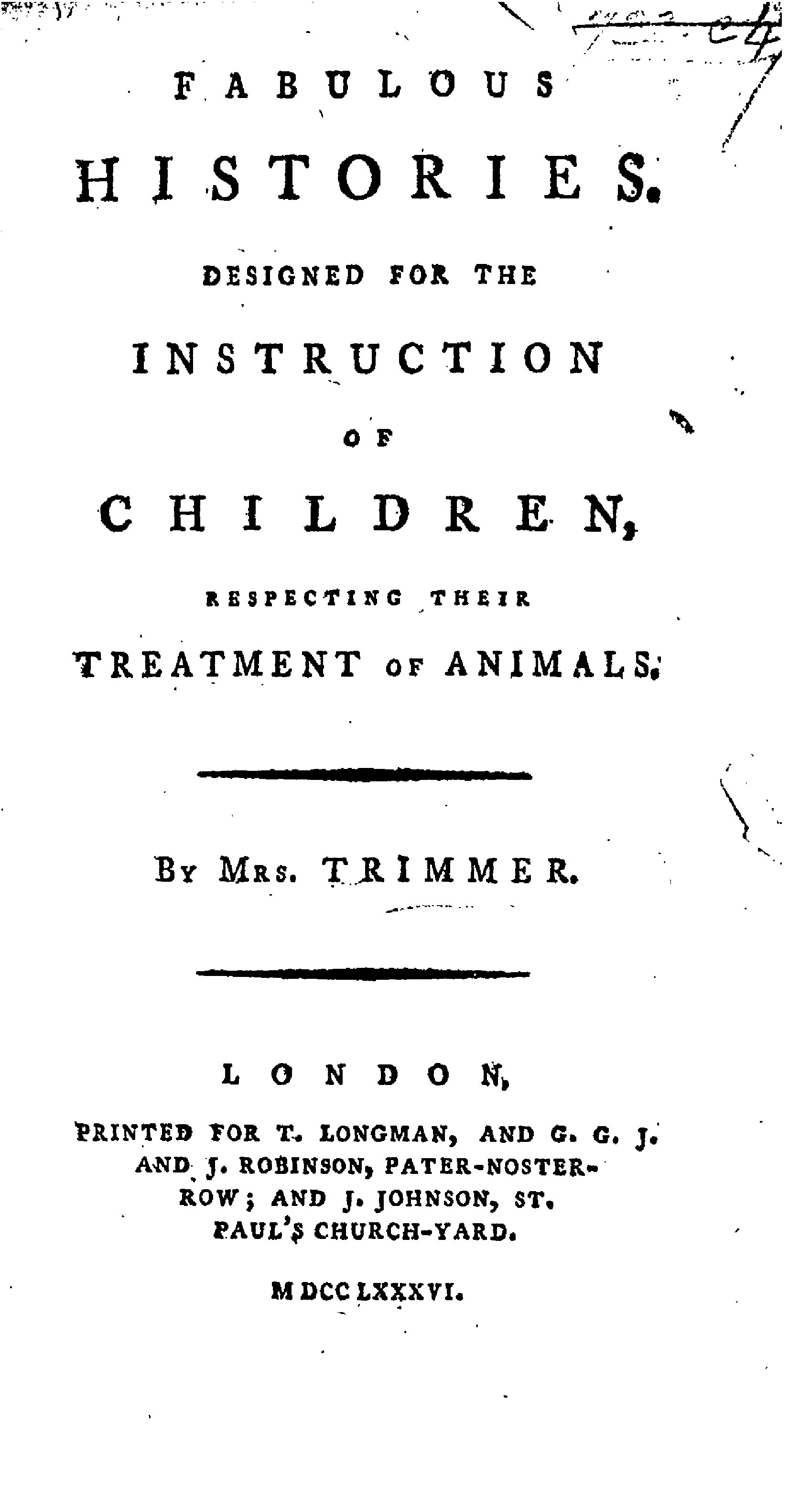
Title page from the first edition of Trimmer's Fabulous Histories (1786)

Fabulous Histories (later known as The Story of the Robins) is the best-known work of Sarah Trimmer. Originally published in 1786, it remained in print until the beginning of the twentieth century.

== Plot ==
Fabulous Histories tells the story of two families—one of robins and one of humans—who learn to live together congenially. The children and baby robins learn to adopt virtue and to shun vice. For Trimmer, practising kindness to animals as a child would hopefully lead one to "universal benevolence" as an adult. According to Samuel Pickering Jr., a scholar of eighteenth-century children's literature, "in its depiction of eighteenth-century attitudes toward animals, Mrs. Trimmer’s Fabulous Histories was the most representative children’s book of the period."

== Thematic elements ==
The text expresses several themes that would dominate Trimmer's later works, such as her emphasis on retaining social hierarchies; as Tess Cosslett, a scholar of children's literature explains: "the notion of hierarchy that underpins Fabulous Histories is relatively stable and fixed. Parents are above children in terms of authority, and humans above animals, in terms both of dominion and compassion: poor people should be fed before hungry animals ... [but] the hierarchical relation of men and women is not so clearly enforced."

Moira Ferguson, a scholar of the eighteenth and nineteenth centuries, places these themes in a larger historical context, arguing that "the fears of the author and her class about an industrial revolution in ascendancy and its repercussions are evident. Hence, [the] text attacks cruelty to birds and animals while affirming British aggression abroad. ... The text subtly opts for conservative solutions: maintenance of order and established values, resignation and compliance from the poor at home, expatriation for foreigners who do not assimilate easily."

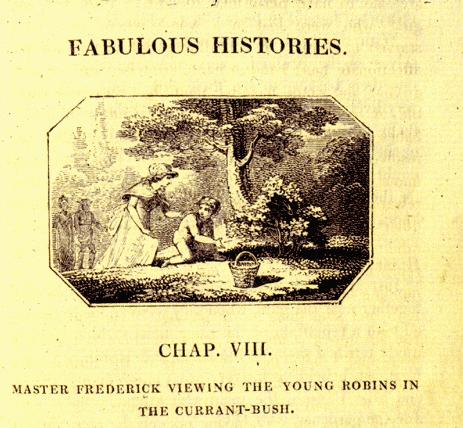
This, the lede image of chapter 8, shows Master Frederick viewing the young robins.

Another overarching theme in the text is rationality; Trimmer expresses the common fear of the power of fiction in her preface, explaining to her childish readers that her fable is not real and that animals cannot really speak. Like many social critics during the eighteenth century, Trimmer was concerned about fiction's potentially damaging impact on young readers. With the rise of the novel and its concomitant private reading, she feared young people and especially women would read racy and adventurous stories without the knowledge of their parents and, perhaps even more worrisome, interpret the books as they pleased. Trimmer therefore always referred to her text as Fabulous Histories and never as The Story of the Robins in order to emphasize its reality; moreover, she did not allow the book to be illustrated within her lifetime—pictures of talking birds would only have reinforced the paradox of the book (it was fiction parading as a history). Yarde speculated that most of the characters in the text are drawn from Trimmer's own acquaintances and family.

== Critical evaluation ==
Murray Knowles, writing in Language and Control in Children's Literature, states that Trimmer intended the book to be used didactically, a common practice in eighteenth-century children's literature. More than one hundred years later, in Juvenile Literature As It Is, Edward Salmon found "nothing unusually meritorious" about the book, though he noted that it "should be praised for its humane sentiments."

== Sources ==
- Cosslett, Tess. "Fabulous Histories and Papillonades." Talking Animals in British Children’s Fiction, 1786–1914. Burlington, VT: Ashgate, 2006. ISBN 0-7546-3656-9.
- Ferguson, Moira. "Sarah Trimmer's Warring Worlds." Animal Advocacy and Englishwomen, 1780–1900: Patriots, Nation, and Empire. Ann Arbor: University of Michigan Press, 1998. ISBN 0-472-10874-3.
- Grenby, M.O. “‘A Conservative Woman Doing Radical Things’: Sarah Trimmer and The Guardian of Education.” Culturing the Child, 1690–1914. Ed. Donelle Ruwe. Lanham, MD: Scarecrow Press, 2005. ISBN 0-8108-5182-2.
- Grenby, Matthew. “Introduction.” The Guardian of Education. Bristol: Thoemmes Press, 2002. ISBN 1-84371-011-0.
- Jackson, Mary V. Engines of Instruction, Mischief, and Magic: Children’s Literature in England from Its Beginnings to 1839. Lincoln: University of Nebraska Press, 1989. ISBN 0-8032-7570-6.
- Pickering, Jr., Samuel F. John Locke and Children’s Books in Eighteenth-Century England. Knoxville: The University of Tennessee Press, 1981. ISBN 0-87049-290-X.
- Yarde, D.M. The Life and Works of Sarah Trimmer, a Lady of Brentford. Middlesex: The Hounslow District Historical Society, 1972. A 1971 printing has the ISBN 0-903254-00-X.
- Yarde, D.M. Sarah Trimmer of Brentford and Her Children with Some of Her Early Writings, 1780–1786. Middlesex: Hounslow and District Historical Society, 1990. OCLC 24722374
