= Bob Biderman =

British-American novelist and publisher

Bob Biderman (1940–2018) was a British-American novelist and publisher known for his coming-of-age novels, Red Dreams – an obverse view of 50s America – and Letters to Nanette, about a young man drafted into the army at the start of the Vietnam War. Biderman is considered one of the wave of literary oppositionists who were active in May 68 and attempted to redefine popular genres, exemplified in his Joseph Radkin Investigation series which combined social and political history in a mystery format. He also was the founding editor and publisher of several magazines – Café Magazine, where he wrote extensively on the social history of coffee and Visions of the City Magazine, an offshoot of The Visions of the City Project which looked at alternative constructs of the urban metropolis. Biderman was one of the founders of Black Apollo Press and edited its popular Rediscovered Victorians series.

== Biography ==
Bob Biderman's father was the poet and political activist, A.E. Biderman and his mother, the visual artist, Fannie Kuller Biderman. He grew up in the American Midwestern city of Cincinnati, Ohio where his father was forced to go underground during the anti-communist purges of the 1950s. This experience provided the basis for several of Biderman's novels: Red Dreams, which viewed the brutalities of McCarthy's America through the eyes of a child and the first of his Radkin mysteries, Strange Inheritance.

In 1954 Biderman's mother left Cincinnati, moving to Los Angeles in search of a more liberal environment in which to raise her children. After the repeal of the Smith Act in 1956, the family was reunited and subsequently moved to Houston, Texas where Biderman completed high school. In 1958 he began his undergraduate work at the University of Texas in Austin where he studied mathematics, transferring two years later to the University of California at Berkeley where he studied science with the idea of becoming a physician.

In 1962 Biderman left the States for Europe, living first in Paris and then London; however in 1963 he was drafted into the military and was forced to return 'by any means'. As Biderman later wrote, 'I took the slowest route possible – in this case a rusty freighter sailing out of Glasgow bound for San Francisco via the Panama Canal'. While in the army he trained as a medic and subsequently worked as a medical technician assigned to the first US Army division destined for Vietnam – though he, himself, remained stateside. His military experiences at the beginning of the Vietnam War became the basis for his debut novel, Letters to Nanette.

After his discharge from the army in 1965, Biderman returned to San Francisco where he worked at odd jobs, 'hanging out at the Café Trieste with the remnants of the Beats', till going back to his studies at San Francisco State University, eventually gaining a degree in English literature. At university he became an activist in the anti-war movement and was a leading participant in the student strike of 1968. His experiences of May 68 became the basis for his novel, Koba. It was during that period he met Joy Magezis, also a leading student activist, whom he married in 1970. In 1971 he and Joy took a motorcycle tour of Europe, ending up in London where the couple lived in Rona Road, Camden and where their first child was born. They returned to San Francisco in 1972, settling in the city's Noe Valley district.

In 1974 Biderman and his wife started a puppet theatre which toured America for the bicentennial, performing in numerous venues across the nation. The birth of their second child in 1977 ended this theatrical venture and in 1978 they set up an arts-in-education resource centre, located on the corner of San Francisco's 29th and Church streets. The resource centre's magazine, The Puppetry-in-Education News, gave Biderman his first experience in publishing and the success of that periodical led him to link up with Bruce Chesse whose publishing house – Early Stages Press – had been printing and distributing puppet related materials. Under Biderman's editorship, the press began to incorporate a wider range of work, eventually becoming the distribution arm of an author's cooperative – The Contemporary Literature Project. Biderman's interest in writing, politics and cooperative publishing led him to become one of the original organisers of the nascent National Writers' Union (the contradictions of which he discussed in Strange Inheritance) and a vocal critic of the American culture industry. His address to the West Coast Writers' Conference in 1982 was widely circulated.

In 1983, Biderman and his young family moved back to Britain, settling in Cambridge where he took up residence as a full-time writer. Struggling to find an outlet for his work, he was influenced by a friend and colleague, Gordon DeMarco, to develop a more popular form of political fiction. DeMarco, himself, was finding limited success as a political mystery writer and had been taken on by Pluto Press as one of the lead authors for their 'New Crime' series. DeMarco had introduced Biderman to Pete Ayrton, who at the time was editing this list and in 1984, Pluto Press published Strange Inheritance, the first of what was to become the Joseph Radkin Investigations series. His second mystery, Koba, set in San Francisco and peopled with the survivors of May 68, was shortlisted for the Pluto Prize but remained unpublished for several years as Pluto was sold and restructured during the economic downturn of the mid-1980s. In 1986 the London-based publishing house, Victor Gollancz, published the next in the Radkin series, Genesis Files (which was listed by the Guardian as one of the top ten crime novels of the year) and then Koba as part of their revamped yellow jacket mysteries.

In 1988, Biderman, now living in Toulouse, France, completed Judgement of Death, the third in the Radkin series. After Toulouse. Biderman returned to the States where he and his family took up residence in Portland, Oregon as cheap housing there became a magnet for struggling artists no longer able to afford San Francisco. DeMarco, who was living in Portland at the time, introduced them to the lively writers' circles that had sprung up in the city. It was in Portland that Biderman wrote the final two books in the Radkin series – Paper Cuts, concerning the clear-cutting of the great redwood forests and Mayan Strawberries, about the Mixtec Indians who travelled north from Guatemala to work the Oregon agricultural harvest.

By 1990, Biderman and his family had decided to go back to England. As Biderman explained it, their return to the United States had been 'sort of a last chance saloon – an attempt to reconnect with our American roots before finally succumbing to the realisation that we were, for better or worse, expatriates.' Settling once again in Cambridge, while taking up a post as lecturer at a further education college in London, he began researching the history of coffee and cafes, 'intrigued by the way the English class system had been circumvented in the 18th century by the development of the coffee house which provided a meeting ground for both prince and pauper.' In 1994 he started Café Magazine which became one of the pioneer publications on the World Wide Web. In 1996, along with David Kelley, a fellow at Trinity College, he began Black Apollo Press 'as a way of connecting to the bohemian subculture – hoping to create a Rive Gauche on the River Cam'. These same years saw Biderman finish the first part of his Social History of Coffee and complete Red Dreams, his semi-autobiographical account of growing up in McCarthy's America.

As the 20th century came to a close, Biderman focused more on his interest in urban anthropology. Along with his son, Kevin Biderman and French colleagues, Yann Perreau and Marc Hatzfield, he helped develop the Visions of the City Project which sought to explore the emergence of new urban constructs as places of connection, refuge and regeneration. This project evolved into Visions of the City Magazine which Biderman edited. In the succeeding years, Biderman focused much of his time on researching 19th century immigration patterns into London from Eastern Europe and the process of assimilation that followed. This research eventually became an exploration of his own Jewish roots and resulted in his last novel – Eight Weeks in the Summer of Victoria's Jubilee: The Queen, the Jews and a Murder.

== Published work ==
- LETTERS TO NANETTE Contemporary Literature Series, San Francisco, 1981; Black Apollo Press, 2004
- STRANGE INHERITANCE Pluto Press, London, 1985
- KOBA Victor Gollancz, London 1988
- GENESIS FILES Victor Gollancz, London 1988; Walker, New York, 1991
- JUDGEMENT OF DEATH Victor Gollancz, London 1989; Walker, New York, 1992 Chivers large print edition, USA, 1992
- PAPER CUTS Victor Gollancz, London 1990
- MAYAN STRAWBERRIES Black Apollo Press, Cambridge 2006
- ANNA AND THE JEWEL THIEVES (as Mortimer Tune) Black Apollo Press, 1993
- THE SOCIAL HISTORY OF COFFEE Black Apollo Press, 1994
- ANNA AND THE JEWEL THIEVES (as Mortimer Tune) Black Apollo Press, 1993
- RED DREAMS Black Apollo Press 1996, Hachette 2008
- TECHNOFARM (as R. J. Raskin) Black Apollo Press, Cambridge
- A KNIGHT AT SEA (as R. J. Raskin) Black Apollo Press, Cambridge
- FURTHER EDUCATION Black Apollo Press, Cambridge
- THE POLKA-DOTTED POSTMAN and Other Stories Black Apollo Press
- COFFEE!!! Stories of Extreme Caffeination Black Apollo Press Cambridge
- ROMANCING PARIS – AGAIN Black Apollo Press Cambridge
- LEFT-HANDED PORTUGUESE ZEN Black Apollo Press Cambridge
