= Fifty Years of Freedom =

Biography by Ray Hemmings

Fifty Years of Freedom: A Study of the Development of the Ideas of A. S. Neill
- Author: Ray Hemmings
- Language: English
- Subject: Educator biography, history of education, general parenting
- Published: 1972 (George Allen and Unwin, UK); 1973 (Schocken Books, US)
- Publication place: England
- Pages: 218
- ISBN: 0-8052-3484-5
- Dewey Decimal: 370.1
- LC Class: LF795.L692953H39

Fifty Years of Freedom: A Study of the Development of the Ideas of A. S. Neill is a 1972 intellectual biography of the British pedagogue A. S. Neill by Ray Hemmings. It traces how Homer Lane, Wilhelm Reich, Sigmund Freud and others influenced Neill as he developed the "Summerhill idea", the philosophy of child autonomy behind his Summerhill School. The book follows Neill's early life and career in rural, Calvinist Scotland and continues through the influence of his mentors, Lane and Reich, and the origins of Summerhill after World War I. Written fifty years from Summerhill's founding, Fifty Years is a sociological and historical analysis of Neill's ideas in the context of intellectual and educational trends both during Neill's life and at the time of publication. Hemmings also surveyed progressive school leaders about Neill's impact on the field and reported their perception of influence on teacher–pupil relations. Fifty Years was first published in England in 1972 by George Allen and Unwin and was later renamed Children's Freedom: A. S. Neill and the Evolution of the Summerhill Idea for its 1973 American publication by Schocken Books.

Contemporary reviewers considered Fifty Years to be the best available biography of Neill. They largely praised its clarity and biographical detail and insight but found the book's philosophical sections comparatively weak and the author biased, as a former teacher from the school.

== Overview ==
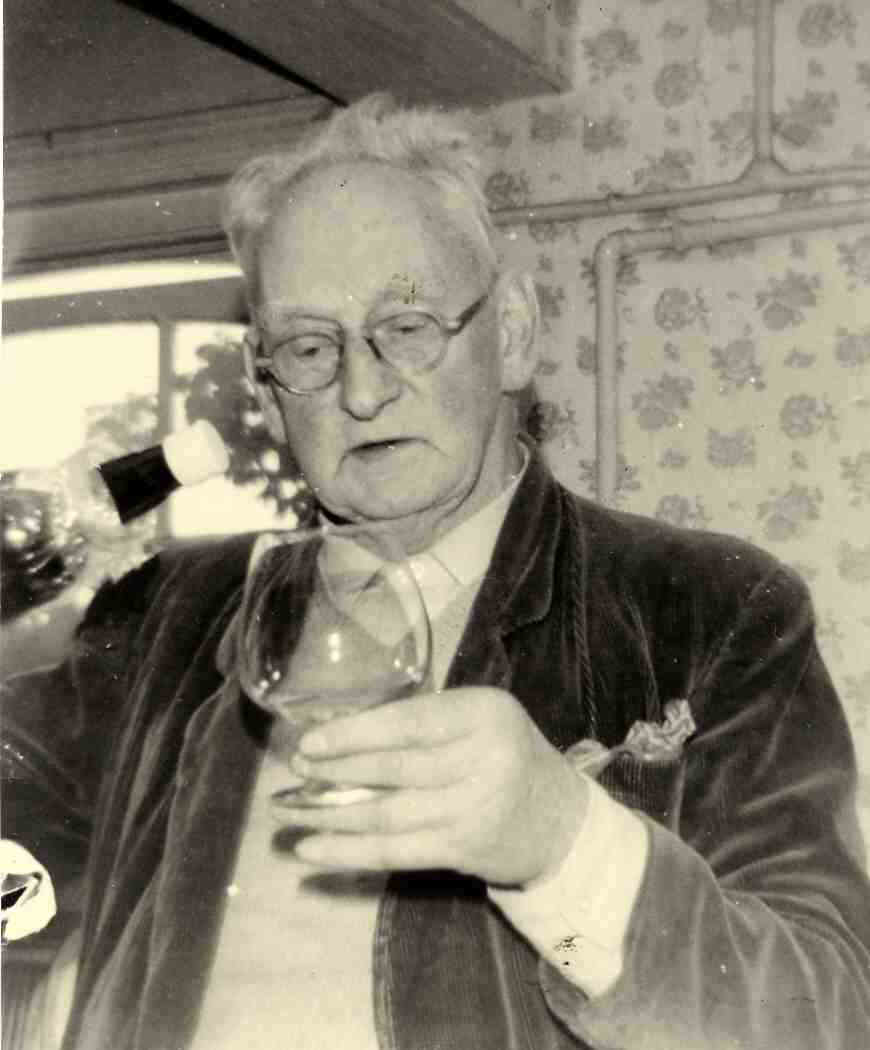
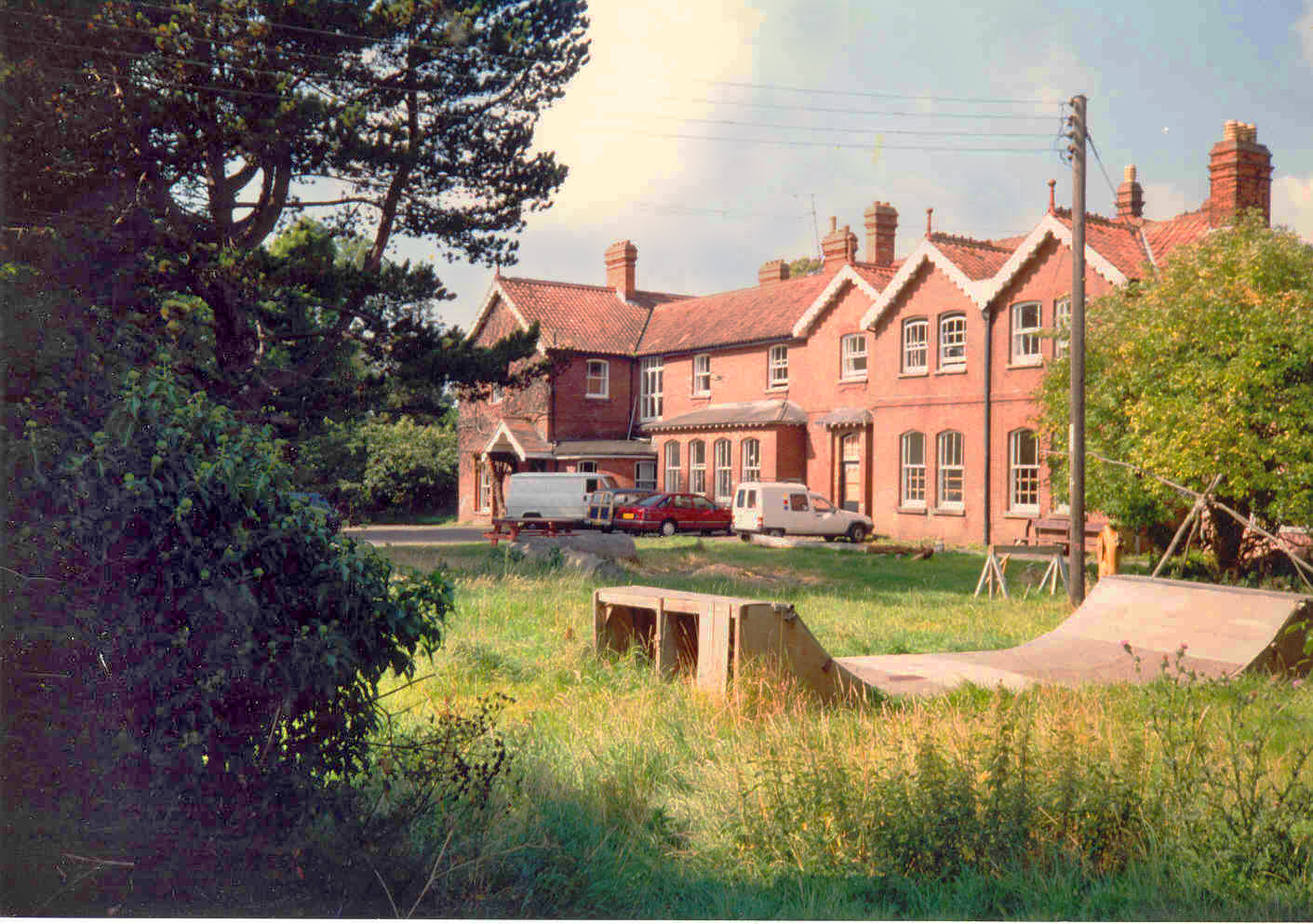
Neill, the subject of the biography, and his school, Summerhill

Fifty Years of Freedom is an intellectual biography of the British pedagogue A. S. Neill that traces the influence of Homer Lane, Wilhelm Reich, Sigmund Freud and others on his thought. Released fifty years after the school's founding, the book is a sociological and historical analysis that presents the development of Neill's "Summerhill idea"—the philosophy of his Summerhill School—in context of related social, political, educational, and intellectual trends. Hemmings himself saw the work as less of a biography than an analysis of Neill's ideas in development and of the outward reception of these ideas. The book was first published in England in 1972 by George Allen and Unwin as Fifty Years of Freedom: A Study of the Development of the Ideas of A. S. Neill, and was later renamed Children's Freedom: A. S. Neill and the Evolution of the Summerhill Idea for its 1973 American publication by Schocken Books. The book includes photographs.

The book follows the course of Neill's life sequentially from his youth in "rural, Calvinist Scotland" to the start of Summerhill between the two World Wars. Hemmings focuses on Neill's relation to education but also minds other biographical detail: the influence of Freudian psychoanalysis and Homer Lane's theories in the 1920s, and of Wilhelm Reich's psychological theories in the 1930s. Hemmings compares Neill's thought with that of Maria Montessori, Bertrand Russell, Fred Clarke, Erich Fromm, Susan Sutherland Isaacs, Benjamin Spock, and contemporaries Paul Goodman, Ivan Illich, R. D. Laing, and Herbert Marcuse. Compared to pedagogues such as Russell, who advocated for the inculcation of certain virtues in a child's education, Neill instead insisted that the child be left to make its own values and decisions apart from adult influence and manipulation. Hemmings also reviews the roles of freedom, authority, and anarchy throughout the maturation of Neill's thought. The final sections explain Summerhill's internal processes, philosophy, and position in both British and global social order. Hemmings contends that Summerhill has remained consistent to its principles while it cycled through roles as one of many 1920s educational experiments, a bastion in the 1930s, and an advocate for "children's freedom" throughout the post-World War II movement for "'informal' education".

Hemmings conducted a study that surveyed 102 progressive heads—broadly defined—of infant, elementary, and secondary schools about Neill's influence. Their responses indicated that Neill had significant impact on how the profession perceived teacher–pupil relations. The respondents also reported significant influence from Neill on moral and sex education. Contrarily, Neill had little impact on school curriculum and classroom teaching methods. Hemmings received little response from heads of state comprehensive schools.

Hemmings had previously taught at Summerhill. In 1973, he was lecturer in Education at the University of Leicester. Other contemporaneous and significant biographies of Neill include Neill's autobiography (Neill! Neill! Orange Peel!, 1972) and Robert Skidelsky's Part Three of English Progressive Schools (1969). Jonathan Croall's Neill of Summerhill (1983) later cited Hemmings's book.

== Reception ==
Though Hemmings did not think of his work as a biography, Richard L. Hopkins (Comparative Education Review) said it essentially was strongest as one. Hopkins wrote in 1976 that Hemmings's book was the best biography of Neill available at the time, and called it "comprehensive", "objective", and "sympathetically thoughtful". In comparison, Neill's autobiography "rambles" and Skidelsky's biography "preens" over "small insights", while Hemmings unpacks larger issues to contextualize "a complex man in a complex world". Reflecting on these three biographies of Neill, Hopkins added that Hemmings's book would interest "comparative educators" most, as that it addressed the two points readers would find most interesting about Neill: the role of his history on his ideas, and the role of his ideas in the outside world. Still, Hopkins thought many readers would find the work "too long and detailed". Hopkins himself found Hemmings's book "a struggle to work through", though more complete compared to Neill's "easy", "stream-of-consciousness" prose. Leonard W. Cowie (British Journal of Educational Studies) said that Fifty Years was written with "great competence" and would be both "interesting and essential" for those interested in understanding Neill. Choice recommended the "excellent volume" for "all readership levels" and considered it more telling than Neill's own autobiography. Shelley Neiderbach (Library Journal) agreed that Hemmings's "admiring ... historical biography" remained "clear, cool, and evenhanded". Sarah Curtis (The Times Literary Supplement) wrote in 1972 that Hemmings's account of Neill was "the most lucid, dispassionate yet sympathetic" published. No system, she wrote, has reconciled the needs for individual freedom and societal regulation.

Commenting on the book's survey study, Cowie (British Journal of Educational Studies) wrote that it was hard to ascertain Neill's true pedagogical influence when state schools, which constitute the majority of schools, had a poor response rate. He added that the progressive education topics reported to be most influenced by Neill continued to be controversial in 1973. Cowie asked whether challenges to authoritarian education were replaced by Neill's methods or by chaos. Hopkins (Comparative Education Review) said the sociological study was more descriptive of Neill's role than contributive to the evolution of his philosophy. Hopkins wrote that the book functioned best as a biography, and that its philosophy sections were "piecemeal" and "sketchy" rather than "comprehensive and coherent". Indeed, he felt that the study and the philosophical portions were more illuminative of Neill's life than of "any broader picture". Robert B. Nordberg (Best Sellers) appreciated some of the book's "important points", such that many advocates for educational freedom, in practice, instead seek more insidious techniques for controlling children. While Curtis (The Times Literary Supplement) felt that the book added little new content, she appreciated the book's detail, such as that Neill's A Dominie's Log was based in fact, not fiction.

Multiple reviewers highlighted Hemmings's association with the school. Cowie (British Journal of Educational Studies) wrote that although Neill did not want disciples, Hemmings "accepts generally the 'Summerhill idea'" and would fit the role. Nicholas Tucker (New Statesman) too noted the book as "very one-sided, verging on the uncritical" despite its readability and signs of thorough research. He said that a balanced account of Summerhill was elusive because of the "sensationalized" press and "rosy" recollections of Neill and his former pupils, similar to the memoirs of "Old Boys' clubs elsewhere". He wrote, however, that Hemmings's position was understandable when considering the criticism that Summerhill and Neill withstood from "conventional educational wisdom" and "horrified hearsay", which had turned the school into "a type of scholastic folk myth" to set straight. Still, Tucker saw less cause for Summerhill's defense by the time of publication as Neill had wider acceptance. He had become a powerful figure in education and his school a template for the American free school movement. Cowie wrote that Neill seemed to be enjoying greater acceptance in his later life as Summerhill was "losing its uniqueness as 'that dreadful school'". Nordberg (Best Sellers) said that while Hemmings has some criticism for Neill and "open education", "he is basically an enthusiast" who wrote a "sympathetic portrayal". Even from this sympathetic angle, Nordberg felt that Neill came across as "the child of an overly strict and demanding father who has spent the rest of his life in a rather one-dimensional crusade, more visceral than rational, against authority in all forms." Altogether, Nordberg wrote, Fifty Years succeeds in its "systematic, scholarly look at the Summerhill idea" but fails to provide "a balanced, profound look" at its counterpart: "need for restraint, rationality, and responsibility in the world".

Neill himself "liked" Fifty Years and thought Hemmings had done a "wonderful job" but "wasn't critical enough". He noted that the work received few reviews compared to his own.
