= Patriarch Matheos =

Patriarch Matheos may refer to:

- Matthew I of Constantinople, Ecumenical Patriarch in 1397–1405
- Matthew II of Constantinople, Ecumenical Patriarch in 1596, 1598–1602 and 1603
- Patriarch Matthew of Alexandria, Greek Patriarch of Alexandria in 1746–1766
