= Black Apollo Press =

Black Apollo Press is an independent publisher based in Cambridge, England. It was founded in 1995 by American writer Bob Biderman and British Baudelairean scholar, David Kelley. As well as publishing original translations of important European authors, including the French existentialist playwright Jean Tardieu and Armenian dissident Gurgen Mahari, the press has brought back into print a group of late Victorian writers such as Margaret Harkness, Amy Levy and Israel Zangwill. Black Apollo has also helped develop a series of art books jointly sponsored by Trinity College, Cambridge, and the French Cultural service. Their backlist includes works of contemporary fiction, poetry and non-fiction titles in media studies social history and politics. An imprint of the press is Black Apollo Mysteries which publishes socially engaged thrillers including the Joseph Radkin Investigations series.
