= Matheos Indjeian =

Armenian archbishop (1877–1950)

Matheos Indjeian (1877 - 26 July 1950) was the Armenian Apostolic Archbishop of Manchester, England, from 1931 until his death in 1950.

Indjeian was born in Istanbul in 1877. He was ordained a cleric in the Armenian Apostolic Church. He was based in Smyrna in 1922 and managed to save much of the Armenian population from deportation and death.

In the 1920s Indjeian studied at Montpellier University and then served in Paris before coming to Manchester as bishop in 1931. Indjeian took part in the elections for a new head of the Armenian Church at the monastery of Echmiadzin in Soviet Armenia in November 1932.

He gained British nationality on 25 May 1938.

Archbishop Indjeian died in Manchester on 26 July 1950.
