= Nicholas Tucker =

English educational psychologist

- Scientific career
- Fields: Educational psychology, cultural studies, children's literature
- Workplaces: Sussex University

Nicholas Tucker is an English academic and writer who is an honorary Senior Lecturer in Cultural Studies at the University of Sussex.

He was educated at Burgess Hill School in Hampstead, London, where his English teacher was briefly Bernice Rubens. A former teacher and then an educational psychologist, he has had a long association with the Sussex University, having lectured in educational psychology and cultural studies and children's literature at the institution. He was a Senior Lecturer in several of these disciplines.

Tucker is a regular broadcaster and participated in Stop the Week on Radio 4. He contributes to The Guardian, The Independent, the New Statesman, and The Times supplements. He lives in Lewes, East Sussex and has three adult children.

== Selected works ==
- ——— (1975). Mother Goose Abroad. Illustrated by Trevor Stubley. New York: Crowell. ISBN 0-690-00092-8.
- What is a Child? (Fontana, 1977)
- The Child and the Book: Psychological and Literary Exploration (Cambridge U. Press, 1981; 1990)
- Family Fictions; Contemporary Classics of Children's Literature, with Nikki Gamble (Continuum, 2001)
- The Rough Guide to Children's Books, 0-5 years (Rough Guides, 2002)
- The Rough Guide to Children's Books, 5-11 years (2002)
- Rough Guide to Books for Teenagers, with Julia Eccleshare (2003)
- Darkness Visible: Inside the World of Philip Pullman (Wizard Books, 2003)

As editor:

- Suitable for Children?: Controversies in Children's Literature (Chatto and Windus, 1976)
- ———; Reynolds, Kimberley, eds. (1997). Enid Blyton: a celebration & reappraisal. London: National Centre for Research in Children's Literature. ISBN 1871954819.
- Children's Book Publishing in Britain Since 1945, co-editor Kimberley Reynolds (Scolar Press, 1998)
