= 1749 in Great Britain =

Events from the year 1749 in Great Britain.

== Incumbents ==
- Monarch – George II
- Prime Minister – Henry Pelham (Whig)

== Events ==
- February – Admiralty revises the command structure of the Royal Navy and issues new Fighting Instructions and (from 25 December) Articles of War.
- 1 February – two princes of Anamaboe who have been taken prisoners and made slaves are presented to King George II of Great Britain. The British government has paid their ransoms and they are placed in the care of the Earl of Halifax.
- 17 March – George Frideric Handel's oratorio Solomon is first performed, at the Covent Garden Theatre in London, including the instrumental passage "The Arrival of the Queen of Sheba".
- 12 April – the Radcliffe Camera in Oxford, designed by James Gibbs, is opened as an academic library.
- 14 April – second-rate HMS Namur is wrecked in a storm near Fort St. David, India, with the loss of 520 lives.
- 27 April – the first official performance of Handel's Music for the Royal Fireworks finishes early due to the outbreak of fire. The piece was composed by Handel for a display in London's Green Park to commemorate the Peace of Aix-la-Chapelle which ended the War of the Austrian Succession in 1748.
- 9 July – British settlement of Halifax, Nova Scotia is founded.
- 12 September – the first recorded game of baseball is played, by Frederick, Prince of Wales, at Kingston upon Thames.
- Undated – Henry Fielding, newly appointed as a magistrate at Bow Street in London first enlists the help of the "Bow Street Runners", an early police force.

== Publications ==
- The second part of John Cleland's erotic novel Fanny Hill (Memoirs of a Woman of Pleasure) is published in February. The author is released from debtor's prison in March. The Church of England asks the Secretary of State to "stop the progress of this vile Book, which is an open insult upon Religion and good manners." In November, Cleland is arrested and charged with "corrupting the King's subjects."
- Henry Fielding's picaresque comic novel The History of Tom Jones, a Foundling is published on 28 February.
- Sarah Fielding's novel The Governess, or The Little Female Academy, generally seen as the first school story.
- John Jones's pro-Dissenter book Free and Candid Disquisitions, which sparks debate regarding reforming the Church of England and the 1662 prayer book.
- The anonymous moralising pamphlet Satan's Harvest Home: or the Present State of Whorecraft, Adultery, Fornication, Procuring, Pimping, Sodomy....
- Henry St John, 1st Viscount Bolingbroke's Idea of a Patriot King.

== Births ==
- 24 January – Charles James Fox, politician (died 1806)
- 29 January – William Sharp, engraver (died 1824)
- 17 May – Edward Jenner, physician (died 1823)

== Deaths ==
- 18 June – Ambrose Philips, poet (born 1675)
- 3 July – William Jones, mathematician (born 1675)
- 14 September – Richard Temple, 1st Viscount Cobham, soldier and politician (born 1675)

== See also ==
- 1749 in Wales
