= Barbara Montagu =

English noblewoman

Lady Barbara Montague (ca. 1722 – August 1765) was a British philanthropist and charity worker, who sponsored programs to assist primarily poor women. As an unmarried woman, and due to illness unable to live with family, she created an alternate family situation that allowed her independence. Joining a community of women in Bath, the group pooled their resources to provide support for each other and others in their community. Upon her death, she left bequests to continue providing for those who had been important in caring for her in her lifetime.

== Early life ==
Lady Barbara Montague, known as "Lady Bab" was born around 1722 to George Montagu, 1st Earl of Halifax and Lady Mary Lumley, the daughter of Richard Lumley, 1st Earl of Scarbrough. Her parents had six daughters, and one son, who would become George Montagu-Dunk, 2nd Earl of Halifax, after changing his surname when he married the heiress Anne Richards, a legatee of Sir Thomas Dunk. Upon their father's death, each of his daughters was apportioned £5,000. Lady Bab's income was placed in an annuity giving her an annual income of around £100.

== Later life ==
Though unacceptable for unmarried women to live alone in the period, Lady Bab, who suffered from a serious heart condition, was unsuited for marriage, or taking residence with any of her sisters, as she could not bear the hectic pace of court life. In 1748 Montagu met Sarah Scott, an English novelist and translator, who was the daughter of Elizabeth (née Drake) and Matthew Robinson, both from distinguished Yorkshire families. One of twelve children, Sarah was close to her sister Elizabeth Montagu, a leader of the Blue Stockings Society, when they were growing up. But, after Sarah's severe bout with smallpox in 1741, she was deemed no longer a suitable catch for marriage and instead sought solace in writing. The two women, unable to find a place in the patriarchal society, forged a household together in Bath among a community of women who found themselves in similar circumstances.

Lady Bab was involved in charitable works, such as creating educational cards to sell with the proceeds dedicated to assist a poor neighbor. The cards contained geographical, historical, and mathematical facts and were used as flash cards. She was also involved in a scheme, which she encouraged Sarah to join, to have poor women knit mittens, that they then sold to their circle of friends. Montagu inspired her companion's dedication to charity and Sarah began holding Sunday school classes for children. When Scott married in 1751, it was understood that Lady Bab was to be part of the household. In less than a year, Sarah's father and brother removed her from her marital home and the two women rejoined the community in Bath. The separation agreement left Sarah with only a small allowance, as her husband returned only a portion of her dowry, making the pooling of the women's resources a necessity.

Among the women in their community, which included Elizabeth Cutts, Sarah Fielding and possibly Jane Collier, was an agreement that they would support each other psychologically and financially, so that they did not become dependent on others. They encouraged each other to publish, to raise funds to complete charitable works. For example, Lady Bab paid for the publishing of a book, The Histories of Some of the Penitents in the Magdalen House, as Supposed to Be Related by Themselves which was printed anonymously in 1759 so that its royalties might support the author. The book deals with penitent prostitutes and the preface, written by Lady Bab, defends the benefits of charity. They organized a small industrial school to teach basic skills to poor girls, as well as a few boys. In 1763, Lady Barbara gained a pension of £300, significantly improving their circumstances.

== Death and legacy ==
Montagu died in August 1765 and was buried in the Church of St Mary, Charlcombe. Per instructions in her will, she returned the £100 annuity her brother had given her in her lifetime. She left over £1,000 to two of her sisters, various members of their community, servants, students she was assisting with education, with the bulk of her estate going to Scott, outright—stating that should Scott remarry, the monies could not come under the control of a spouse. Scott lived for thirty years after the death of Montagu, benefiting from her largess and adhering to the charitable principles they had established together.
