= Arthur Collier =

British philosopher (1680–1732)

Arthur Collier (12 October 1680 – September 1732) was an English Anglican priest and philosopher who wrote about the non-existence of an absolute external world.

== Early life ==
Collier was born at the rectory of Steeple Langford, Wiltshire. He entered Pembroke College, Oxford, in July 1697, but in October 1698 he and his brother William became members of Balliol. His father having died in 1697, it was arranged that the family living of Langford Magna should be given to Arthur as soon as he was old enough.

== Career ==
Having graduated from Oxford and been made a priest, Collier was presented to the benefice of Steeple Langford in 1704, holding it until his death in 1732. His sermons show no traces of his bold theological speculations, and he seems to have been faithful in the discharge of his duty. He was in financial difficulties (some say due to his wife), from which at last he was obliged to free himself by selling the reversion of the Langford advowson to Corpus Christi College, Oxford. He and the family moved to Salisbury where Jane and Margaret Collier were born.

His philosophical opinions grew out of a diligent study of Descartes and Malebranche. John Norris also strongly influenced him by his An Essay towards the Theory of the Ideal or Intelligible World (1701–1704). It is remarkable that Collier makes no reference to Locke, and shows no sign of having any knowledge of his works. As early as 1703 he seems to have become convinced of the non-existence of an absolute external world, which would have no relation to a perceiving observer. In 1712 he wrote two essays, which are still in manuscript, one on substance and accident, and the other called Clavis Philosophica. His chief work appeared in 1713, under the title Clavis Universalis: or, A New Inquiry after Truth. Being a Demonstration of the Non-Existence, or Impossibility, of an External World (printed privately, Edinburgh, 1836, and reprinted in Metaphysical Tracts, 1837, edited by Sam. Parr). It was favourably mentioned by Reid, Stewart and others, was frequently referred to by the Leibnitzians, and was translated into German by Johann Christian Eschenbach the Elder in 1756, Berkeley's Treatise Concerning the Principles of Human Knowledge and Theory of Vision preceded it by three and four years respectively, but there is no evidence that they were known to Collier before the publication of his book.

== Private life ==
Collier married Margaret the daughter of Nicholas Johnson who was the army's paymaster and his wife who was a sister of Sir Stephen Fox. He had four children who survived him. Arthur was a lawyer who died in 1777; Charles became a colonel; Jane Collier was a writer and Margaret Collier travelled.

== Philosophical work ==
His views are grounded on two presuppositions:

1. The utter aversion of common sense to any theory of representative perception
2. The difference between imagination and sense perception is only one of degree.

The former is the basis of the negative part of his argument; the latter supplies him with all the positive account he has to give, and that is meagre enough. The Clavis consists of two parts. After explaining that he will use the term external world in the sense of absolute, self-existent, independent matter, he attempts in the first part to prove that the visible world is not external, by showing first, that the seeming externality of a visible object is no proof of real externality, and second, that a visible object, as such, is not external.

The image of a centaur seems as much external to the mind as any object of sense; and since the difference between imagination and perception is only one of degree, God could so act upon the mind of a person imagining a centaur, that he would perceive it as vividly as any object can be seen. Similar illustrations are used to prove the second proposition, that a visible object, as such, is not external.

The first part ends with a reply to objections based on the universal consent of men, on the assurance given by touch of the extra existence of the visible world, and on the truth and goodness of God (Descartes), which would be impugned if our senses deceived us. Collier argues naively that if universal consent means the consent of those who have considered the subject, it may be claimed, for his view. He thinks with Berkeley, that objects of sight are quite distinct from those of touch, and that the one therefore cannot give any assurance of the other; and he asks the Cartesians to consider how far God's truth and goodness are called in question by their denial of the externality of the secondary qualities.

The second part of the book is taken up with a number of metaphysical arguments to prove the impossibility of an external world. The pivot of this part is the logical principle of contradiction. From the hypothesis of an external world a series of contradictions are deduced, such as that the world is both finite and infinite, is movable and immovable, &c.; and finally, Aristotle and various other philosophers are quoted, to show that the external matter they dealt with, as mere potentiality, is just nothing at all. Among other uses and consequences of his treatise, Collier thinks it furnishes an easy refutation of the Romish doctrine of transubstantiation. If there is no external world, the distinction between substance and accidents vanishes, and these become the sole essence of material objects, so that there is no room for any change whilst they remain as before. Sir William Hamilton thinks that the logically necessary advance from the old theory of representative perception to idealism was stayed by anxiety to save this miracle of the church; and he gives Collier credit for being the first to make the discovery.

His Clavis Universalis is interesting on account of the resemblance between its views and those of Berkeley. Both were moved by their dissatisfaction with the theory of representative perception. Both have the feeling that it is inconsistent with the common sense of mankind, which will insist that the very object perceived is the sole reality. They equally affirm that the so-called representative image is the sole reality, and discard as unthinkable the unperceiving material cause of the philosophers. Of objects of sense, they say, their esse is percipi. But Collier never got beyond a bald assertion of the fact, while Berkeley addressed himself to an explanation of it. The thought of a distinction between direct and indirect perception never dawned upon Collier. To the question how all matter exists in dependence on percipient mind his only reply is, "Just how my reader pleases, provided it be somehow". As cause of our sensations and ground of our belief in externality, he substituted for an unintelligible material substance an equally unintelligible operation of divine power. His book exhibits no traces of a scientific development. The most that can be said about him is that he was an intelligent student of Descartes and Malebranche, and had the ability to apply the results of his reading to the facts of his experience. In philosophy he is a curiosity, and nothing more. His biographer attributes the comparative failure of the Clavis to its inferiority in point of style, but the crudeness of his thought had quite as much to do with his failure to gain a hearing. Hamilton (Discussions, p. 197) allows greater sagacity to Collier than to Berkeley, on the grounds that he did not vainly attempt to enlist man's natural belief against the hypothetical realism of the philosophers. But Collier did so as far as his light enabled him. He appealed to the popular conviction that the proper object of sense is the sole reality, although he despaired of getting men to give up their belief in its externality, and asserted that nothing but prejudice prevented them from doing so; and there is little doubt that, if it had ever occurred to him, as it did to Berkeley, to explain the genesis of the notion of externality, he would have been more hopeful of commending his theory to the popular mind.

In theology Collier was an adherent of the High Church party, though his views were by no means orthodox. In the Jacobite Mists Journal he attacked Bishop Hoadly's defence of sincere errors. His views on the problems of Arianism, and his attempt to reconcile it with orthodox theology, are contained in A Specimen of True Philosophy (1730, reprinted in Metaphysical Tracts, 1837) and Logology, or a Treatise on the Logos in Seven Sermons on John 1. 1, 2, 3, 14 (1732, analysed in Metaph. Tracts). These may be compared with Berkeley's Siris.

== See also ==
- Solipsism
