= An Essay on the Art of Ingeniously Tormenting =

1753 book by Jane Collier

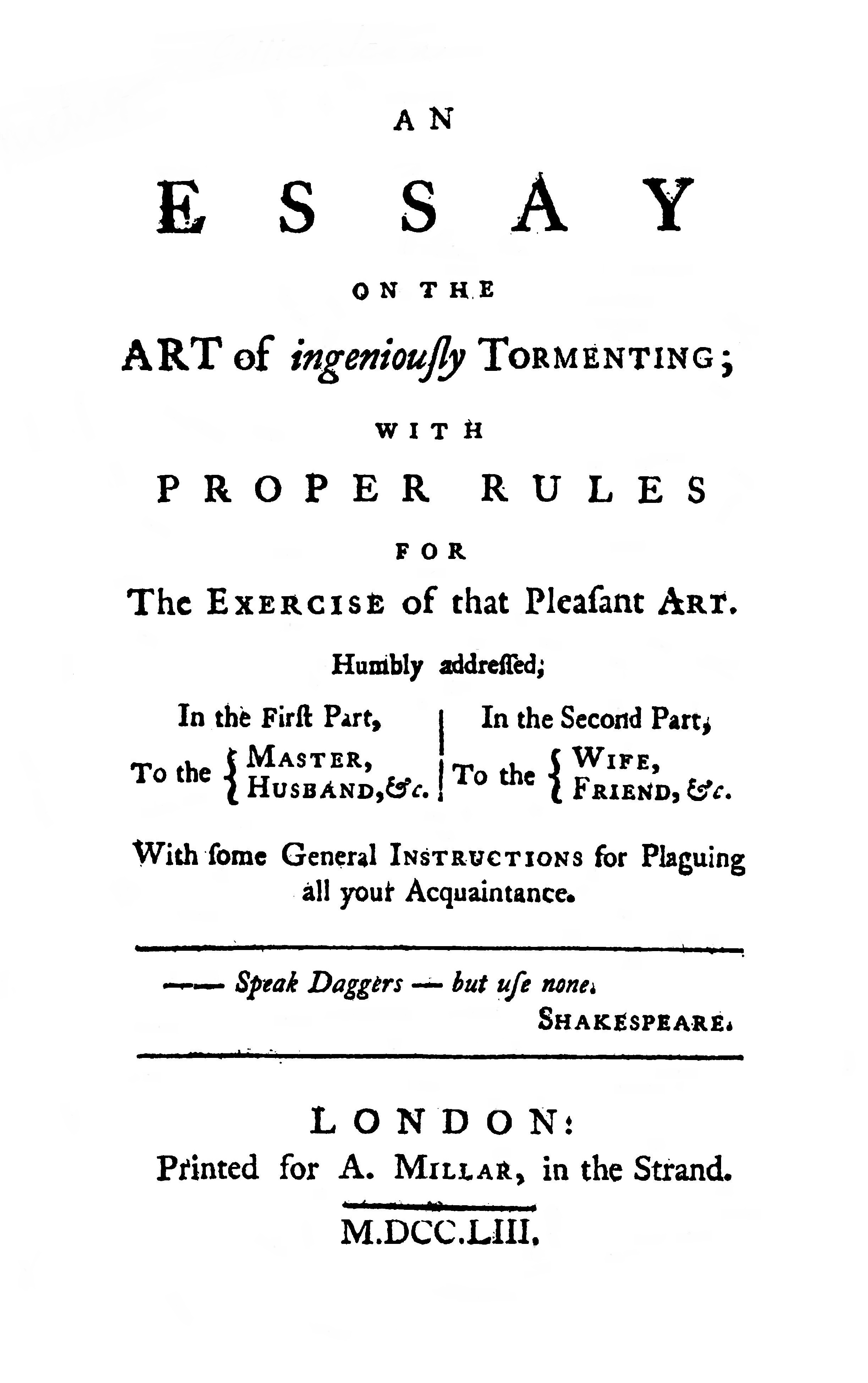
Title page

An Essay on the Art of Ingeniously Tormenting was a conduct book written by Jane Collier and published in 1753. The Essay was Collier's first work, and operates as a satirical advice book on how to nag. It was modelled after Jonathan Swift's satirical essays, and is intended to "teach" a reader the various methods for "teasing and mortifying" one's acquaintances. It is divided into two sections that are organised for "advice" to specific groups, and it is followed by "General Rules" for all people to follow.

Although the work was written by Jane Collier, there is speculation as to who may have helped contribute to the content and style of the work, ranging from friends to fellow writers such as Sarah Fielding, Samuel Richardson and James Harris. There was only one edition printed during Collier's life, but there were many subsequent revisions and republications of the work.

== Background ==
In 1748, Collier was living with her brother Arthur in London. The conditions were not suitable, and she became the governess for Samuel Richardson's daughter, Patty, by 1750. Richardson was impressed by her understanding of Latin and Greek along with her ability to perform her domestic duties. During this time, Collier was living with Sarah Fielding, and Richardson would spend time discussing writing with them.

It was under Richardson's employment that she wrote An Essay on the Art of Ingeniously Tormenting. It has been suggested that Richardson helped Collier write the work, but Richardson's lack of satirical skill has dispelled such ideas. Instead, it was probably James Harris and Fielding who helped craft the satire, and all three probably helped to edit the work. However, most of Collier's help came from Fielding, who was a close friend and shared many of her earlier works with Collier.

The first edition was printed by Richardson for Andrew Millar in 1753. A second edition of the Essay was published by Millar in 1757, two years after Collier's death, but with revisions made by her shortly after its first printing. Subsequently, editions and revisions were published in 1795, 1804, 1805, 1806, 1808, 1809 and 1811.

== An Essay ==
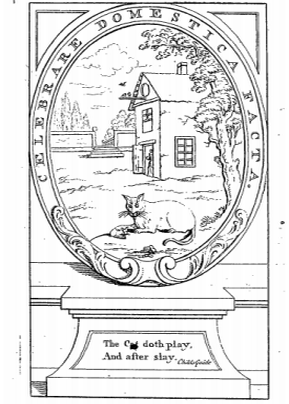
Frontispiece: "The Cat doth play,/ And after slay." – Childs Guide

The Essay is modelled on Jonathan Swift's satire Instructions to Servants (1746), and even mentions Swift directly, but Collier reverses the roles in Swift's satire and instead writes from a servant's perspective in the first book. All of her suggestions are to aid in the process of "teasing and mortifying".

She begins her work with an actual "Essay on the Art of Tormenting" that serves as an introduction, before dividing the book into two parts. In this introduction, the narrator claims:

"One strong objection, I know, will be made against my whole design, by people of weak consciences; which is, that every rule I shall lay down will be exactly opposite to the doctrine of Christianity. Greatly, indeed, in a Christian country, should I fear the forces of such an objection, could I perceive, that any one vice was refrained from on that account only. Both theft and murder are forbidden by God himself: yet can anyone say, that our lives and properties would be in the least secure, were it not for the penal laws of our country?"

Part the First is divided into four sections: "Instructions to Masters and Mistresses, concerning their Servants", "To the Patronesses of an Humble Companion", "To Parents" and "To the Husband". To the master and mistresses, the narrator claims that "you are no true lover of the noble game of Tormenting, if a good dinner, or any other convenience or enjoyment, can give you half the pleasure, as the teasing and mortifying a good industrious servant, who has done her very best to please you."

Part the Second is divided into four sections: "To Lovers", "To the Wife", "To the Friend" and "To your Good Sort of People; being an appendage to the foregoing chapter". To wives, she tells them to "Be out of humour when your husband brings company home: be angry, if he goes abroad without you; and troublesome, if he takes you with him." When speaking to friends, she argues that "injuries go nearest to us, that we neither deserve nor expect".

Added to the work are "General Rules for plaguing all your acquaintance; with the description of a party of pleasure" along with a "Conclusion" and "A Fable". As a general rule, the narrator says, "By all means avoid an evenness of behaviour. Be, sometimes, extremely glad to see people; and, at other times, let your behaviour be hardly within the rules of good breeding."

== Critical response ==
Most of her contemporaries had only good things to say about the work. Henry Fielding complimented Collier on the work by declaring she had "an Understanding more than Female, mixed with virtues almost more than human". This line was part of a greater poem written by Fielding and inscribed on a copy of his favourite book of Horace. This was one of Fielding's last actions before he left for Lisbon, where he died shortly after.

Later, Betty Rizzo described the work as the "best-known generic satire written in the eighteenth century by a woman". Martin and Ruthe Battestin stated that Collier was "an author of wit and spirit". Some critics find it interesting that Collier would "yoke" Richardson with those that he "felt especial antipathy" with: Swift and Fielding. Katherine Craik describes the work as "a courageous social satire published at a time when satires were usually written by and for men".

== See also ==
- The Cry: a New Dramatic Fable (1754), written by Collier and Sarah Fielding.
