= Jane Collier =

English novelist

Jane Collier (1714 – March 1755) was an English novelist best known for her book An Essay on the Art of Ingeniously Tormenting (1753). She also collaborated with Sarah Fielding on her only other surviving work The Cry (1754).

== Personal life ==
Collier was baptized on 16 January 1715 in Wiltshire, the daughter of philosopher and clergyman Arthur Collier, and Margaret Johnson. She had two brothers and one sister. In 1716, their family were forced to move into a less expensive residence in Salisbury to pay debts. It was here that her brother Arthur, named after their father, studied law and educated his sisters, along with her childhood friend Sarah Fielding, in Greek and Latin language and literature; his manner of education was to prepare the girls to become governesses.

In 1732, her father died and Jane Collier (then 17), along with her sister Margaret Collier (then 15), were left without anyone to provide for them. In 1748, the sisters moved in with their brother Arthur who was living in the Doctors' Commons. During this time, Arthur "quarrelled" with Henry Fielding, complicating relations between the Collier siblings, but apparently not between Henry and Sarah Fielding. A year later, in 1749, the Colliers' mother died. Soon after, the living arrangements dissolved, and Margaret became the governess to Henry Fielding's daughters and Jane with the novelist Samuel Richardson. Richardson was impressed by Collier's education, and wrote to Lady Bradshaigh that Jane was proof "that women may be trusted with Latin and even Greek, and yet not think themselves above their domestic duties."

Collier never married, possibly because she could not offer a sufficient dowry, or possibly because, like Sarah Fielding, she hoped to establish an independent living through her writing. In 1748, Richardson was using Collier as a go between with Sarah Fielding in order to help the two write. In 1753, she wrote The Art of Ingeniously Tormenting with the help of Sarah Fielding and possibly James Harris or Samuel Richardson. Afterwards, it was Richardson who printed the work. Her final book, written with Sarah Fielding, was The Cry, published in 1754.

She died in London before the end of March 1755, just a year after the publication of The Cry. After her death, Richardson wrote to Sarah Fielding: "Don't you miss our dear Miss Jenny Collier more and more? — I do." Before she died, she planned a sequel to The Cry, describing it as "A book called The Laugh on the same plan as The Cry". Richardson urged Fielding to revise The Cry just two years later.

== Style ==
Collier's The Art of Ingeniously Tormenting has been described as the "best-known generic satire written in the 18th century by a woman." She is one of the many female 18th-century authors (including Frances Burney, Sarah Fielding, Sarah Scott, and Charlotte Smith) who experimented with "alternative models for relationships, for different ways of regarding others and even for ameliorating society."

As a sign of his favour for Collier's style, satiric humor, and classical learning, Henry Fielding wrote in the beginning of an edition of Horace:

To Miss Jane Collyer,
This Edition of the best
of all the Roman Poets,
as a Memorial (however poor)
of the highest Esteem for
an Understanding more than
Female, mixed with virtues almost
more than human, gives, offers up
and dedicates her Sincere Friend

Henry Fielding

This was one of the last works that Fielding would write because he left that evening on a trip to Lisbon where he died two months later.

== List of works ==
- An Essay on the Art of Ingeniously Tormenting (1753). A social satire that was originally published anonymously and sold well, with ten editions being published between 1753 and 1811.
- The Cry: A New Dramatic Fable (1754), by Collier and Sarah Fielding. A complex work describing the struggle of its heroines against the 'spiteful and malicious tongues' of an unprincipled society.
