= Margaret Collier =

English companion and correspondent (1719–1794)

- Born: 1719; Salisbury, Wiltshire, England
- Died: 1794 (aged 74–75); Ryde, Isle of Wight
- Occupation: companion
- Writing career
- Genre: letters

Margaret Collier (1719 – 1794) was an English correspondent of Samuel Richardson.

== Life ==
Collier was born in Salisbury in 1719. Her parents were Margaret and Arthur Collier. Her father had acquired the benefice of Steeple Langford in 1704. Her father blamed their financial difficulties on his wife.) Her family had then moved to Salisbury where Jane and Margaret were born. Her father sold the reversion of the Langford advowson to Corpus Christi College, Oxford before he died in 1732.

Collier had nowhere to live, but she was given a home by Henry Fielding who let her become a companion to his daughter and then his second wife, Mary Daniel. Margaret's sister, Jane, had already collaborated on a book with Henry's sister Sarah Fielding. She went with Henry Fielding's party when he went to Lisbon to find a cure for his maladies in 1754 on the Queen of Portugal. Fielding completed his book A Journey to Lisbon some weeks before he died in Lisbon in October 1754. It was said that Margaret had a talent for catching a likeness of someone and she had cut a silhouette of Fielding that was later used as was a basis for William Hogarth's "Taunton" portrait of him.

In 1755 she went to live on the Isle of Wight where she would read the novels of Samuel Richardson to a couple she know. She read them both Clarissa, which she had read three times before, and Richardson's novel Sir Charles Grandison. Collier gained a reputation as a fan of Richardson after she wrote letters to him telling him of her exploits.

Collier died in Ryde in 1794.
