= The History of the Countess of Dellwyn =

1759 novel by Sarah Fielding

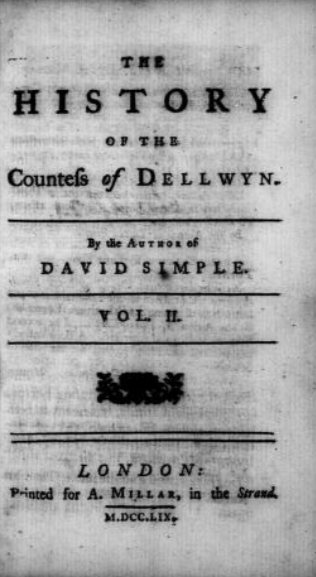
- Title page for The History of the Countess of Dellwyn (1759)
- Author: Sarah Fielding
- Language: English
- Genre: Fiction
- Publication date: 1759
- Publication place: England
- Media type: Print

The History of the Countess of Dellwyn is a 1759 novel by Sarah Fielding. It has also been published as The Countess of Dellwyn.

== Publication history ==
The History of the Countess of Dellwyn was published on 28 March 1759. Andrew Millar, the text's publisher, paid Fielding sixty guineas for 1,000 copies of the first edition, with an agreement for an additional forty guineas if demand warranted a second edition. Samuel Richardson is responsible for the novel's printing, which cost six shillings. Within that year, a Dublin edition and a serialized version of Mrs. Bilson's story were put on the market. A German translation followed in 1761. However, a second edition was never printed.

== Critical context ==
Unlike Fielding's The Adventures of David Simple (1744), The History of the Countess of Dellwyn, her penultimate novel, has only recently begun to receive sustained scholarly attention. In part, this critical neglect has developed in response to the novel's status as what Linda Bree calls a "problem text" that exemplifies "the tension that inevitably arises between moral and theoretical certitudes on the one hand and the ambiguities and ambivalences of experience on the other".
