= Millenium Hall =

1762 novel by Sarah Scott

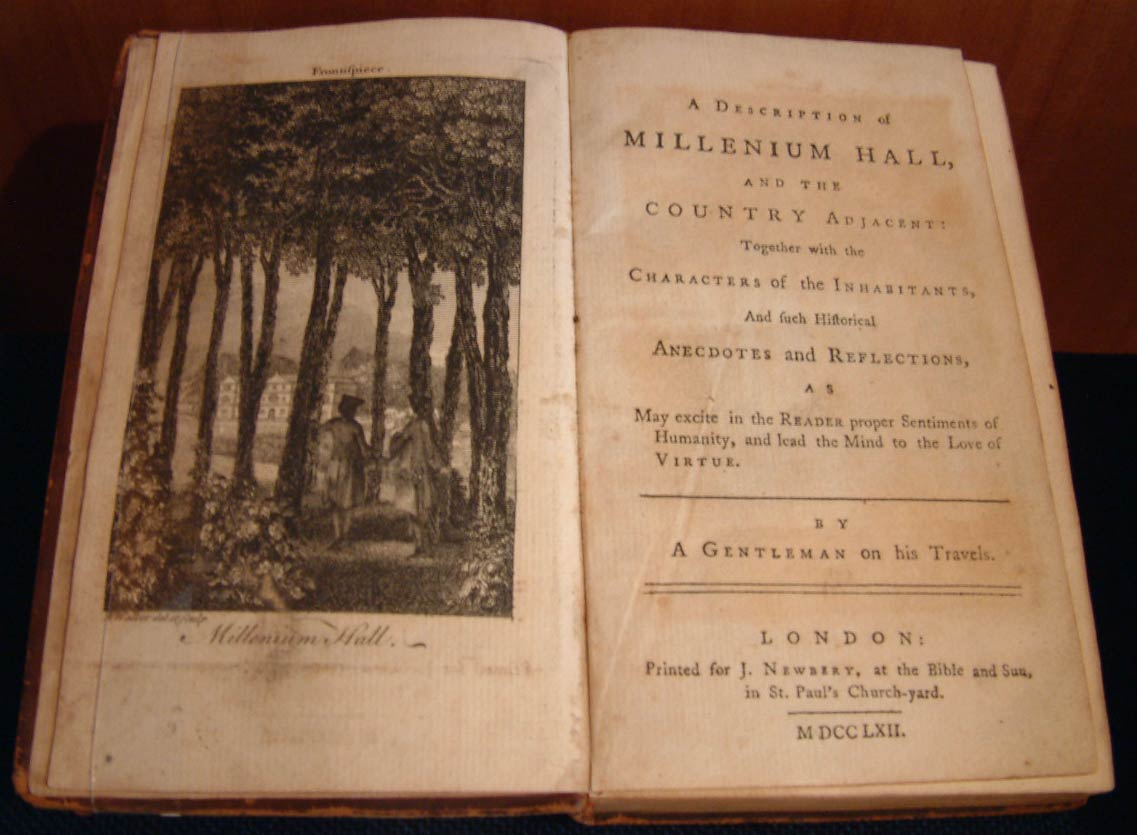
- An early edition of Millenium Hall.
- Author: Sarah Scott
- Language: English
- Genre: Utopian fiction, women’s fiction, philosophical fiction
- Published: 1762
- Publisher: John Newbery
- Publication place: United Kingdom
- Media type: Paperback, 262 pages
- OCLC: OL5054065M
- Dewey Decimal: 823.6
- Preceded by: The History of Mecklenburgh
- Followed by: The History of Sir George Ellison

A Description of Millenium Hall and the Country Adjacent [sic] is a 1762 utopian novel by Sarah Scott, originally published anonymously under the moniker "A Gentleman on his Travels." It describes a secluded utopian community of women which embodies mid-eighteenth century bluestocking ideals that sought to reform cultural and economic aspects of British society at large. The text is narrated by a former Jamaican planter traveling to the countryside of Cornwall, who comes upon the community of women with his young, rakish companion, Lamont. Much of the text is spent recounting the design of the community and the personal histories of the women who come to live at the manor the narrator calls Millenium Hall. Each has a different story involving disillusionment with their roles in the patriarchy, eventually leading them to divest from it altogether and find a haven of female friendship on the grounds of the estate. The novel is told in an epistolary format, and draws from contemporary genres like the estate poem and conduct books.

The women in the novel have intense, complex relationships with each other that extend beyond the typical confines of female relationships as they nurture each other's well-being, both intellectual and emotional. A recurrent theme of the novel is the idea of what to do with women who are unmarried; Millenium Hall shows that women should not only be allowed to be unmarried, but that being unmarried can liberate them from the barriers they wouldn't be able to overcome otherwise. Overall, the novel advocates for a vision of female relationships that mutually support the independence of everyone involved. However, the women of the hall are only able to rely on each other because of their elevated social class. Since the resources required to recreate the hall were only accessible to the gentry, this becomes an unrealistic model for the lower classes.

== Plot summary ==
Millenium Hall begins with two men – an unnamed narrator and his friend's son, Mr. Lamont – stumbling upon a utopian society called “Millenium Hall” after their carriage breaks down. Upon arriving at the Hall, the men are greeted by Mrs. Maynard and Mrs. Selyvn who kindly offer to help the men stay out of the bad weather by letting them stay in their community building. The rest of the novel is taken up by the narrator's description of the Hall, its members, and the stories of various women who live there. The men are also taken to see the various charity projects being done on the property of the Hall (i.e., caring for disabled people).

All of the women's stories are told in a flashback narration, where the reader is taken back to the beginning of their lives and told of the most prominent details of their lives chronologically. The women of the Hall share the experience of being abandoned at youth (dead parent/s, etc.); struggling to find love with men, being let down by them in various ways, and finding themselves in financial trouble. All of the stories are told by Mrs. Maynard.

At the very end of their tour through the Hall and the women's lives, the two men share an awakening. They both feel enlightened by the women and their charitable projects, philanthropy, and tight-knit community. They also enjoy the various philosophical conversations they have with the women. At the end of their time in the Hall, the narrator finds Mr. Lamont reading the New Testament (something he normally would not do before). Additionally, the narrator says that he wishes to imitate the Hall, thus showing how both men were impressed and moved by the women.

== Characters ==
=== George Ellison ===
George Ellison (who goes unnamed in Millenium Hall, but is retroactively named in the sequel the History of Sir George Ellison) narrates the novel in the form of a letter to an old friend, though the narration occasionally changes between him and his cousin Mrs. Maynard, who tells all of the women's stories. He generally appears to be responsive to the women's ideas in the novel, but has a few moments of resistance or genuine misunderstanding. At the end of the novel, we see him wanting to imitate something like the hall because of his profound interest in it.

=== Mr. Lamont ===
Mr. Lamont is the son of the narrator's friend. He's conceited and takes part in debauchery; his overall attitude is indicative of a man who does not understand much, but the narrator still says he is a good-natured, interesting man. By the end of the novel, Mr. Lamont changes his ways and becomes a reformed man; we see him at the very end of the book reading the New Testament, inspired by the women of the hall.

=== Mrs. Maynard ===
Mrs. Maynard narrates all of the women's lives throughout the book. This establishes her as someone who knows quite a lot of information about the women, and who is very clearly involved with their lives. We never directly hear her story, though it is assumed that she has a similar background to all of the women. She is also aware of all of the rules of the Hall, and takes care of all of its finances (i.e., allocation of funds into charity donations). She is described by the narrator as being “a little woman”, who is well-made. She presents a youthful countenance, though it had been “tempered with a serenity which becomes her age”. Early in the story, George discovers she is his cousin.

=== Mrs. Selvyn ===
Mrs. Selvyn is first described by the narrator as having “features that are too irregular to be handsome, but there is a sensibility and delicacy in her countenance which render her extremely engaging; and her person is elegant”. She is brought up by her father, Mr. Selvyn, and is educated in many subjects by him. She is not initially educated in a religious sense because her father does not believe in it, though this ends up changing later when he talks to a minister. When Mrs. Selvyn is seventeen, a man named Lord Peyton tries to secure her hand in marriage – first, a private one, then a public one. Mrs. Selvyn eventually tells Lord Peyton that she cannot be his wife, saying “...how could I support being hourly exposed to the sight of a man, whose eyes would always seem to reproach me!” She stays unmarried for the duration of the novel.

=== Mrs. Trentham ===
Mrs. Trentham's physical features are described by the narrator to have been affected by smallpox, but that she was probably beautiful once. Mrs. Maynard tells the men that Mrs. Trentham's mother died quickly after she gave birth to her, and her father only lived for eight years after her mother passed. Mrs. Trentham is left with a fortune of eleven thousand pounds. So, her father's mother – Mrs. Alworth – takes her into her care. Mrs. Trentham was very beautiful both externally and “mentally”, which got her the attention of strangers; “she was innocence and simplicity itself”; and was ultimately disliked by others due to their envy for her. Mr. Alworth, Mrs. Alworth's grandson, was the only person she could call a friend. Mrs. Trentham marries Mr Parnel, though it is revealed later that he married her more out of "gratitude" than his love for her. Once the dust has settled with Mr. Alworth's interest in Miss Melman, Mr. Alworth reveals that he is "violently in love with" Mrs. Trentham. This upsets her, and she leaves (with some difficulty) to the country, where there is less chance of her running into men who want to pursue her. Eventually she comes to meet Mrs Maynard, and gives her fortune of eleven thousand pounds to the Hall and joins it.

=== Lady Mary Jones ===
Lady Mary Jones is first described by the narrator as “...exquisitely genteel, and her voice, in common speech, enchantingly melodious”. She was orphaned at a young age, so Lady Sheerness (her aunt) decides to raise her. Eventually, she falls in love with Mr. Lenman, but it turns out that he had been married for some time to another woman. She later goes on to become intimate with Lord Robert, one of her admirers. However, as they grow closer, Lady Mary finds herself wanting out of the relationship; their relationship ends and she leaves London to go to the country. Lady Sheerness passes away, and with her death, Lady Mary is left in destitution. Lady Brumpton (a relative of hers) takes her into her care, but later dies; however, she leaves Lady Mary with ten thousand pounds and access to all her “plate and jewels”.

=== Mrs. Morgan ===
The narrator first describes Mrs Morgan as having “[a] universal and tender benevolence beam[ing] from every glance she casts around her”; she is described as being majestic and dignified ––She starts out as ‘Miss Melvyn’ before she is married to Mr Morgan, who is a strange man who would not leave her alone until she married him. Once they are married, Mr Morgan tries to isolate her by not allowing her to have friends over (because he wants to become the most beloved person to her). Going to church would be the only time Mrs Morgan would be in public, and even though she charms everyone she meets, she still finds her beauty to put her at a disadvantage. Eventually, Mr Morgan falls gravely ill, so Mrs Morgan is tasked with constantly staying by his side. This goes on for three months before he finally dies; Mrs Morgan receives a good fortune from him, to which she goes to Tunbridge with Miss Mancel. Eventually, they (along with Lady Mary) come to build the Millenium Hall society from the fortunes they have gathered.

=== Mr. Hintman ===
Mr. Hintman functions as guardian for Louisa after her aunt passes away. He wants to “see her educated in all accomplishments proper for a young person of fashion and fortune”, so he sends her to a French boarding school (as opposed to letting her stay with him). His relationship with Louisa becomes predatory; “That as he was easily captivated, so he was soon tired; and seldom kept a woman long after he had obtained the free possession of her...” He dies of apoplexy before the events of the novel.

=== Louisa Mancel ===
Louisa Mancel is orphaned at a young age. This clearly has a negative effect on her: “...the distress and sorrow which were impressed on her countenance, at an age generally too volatile and thoughtless to be deeply affected...”. She is pursued later in life by Sir Edward, but eventually turns him down because “neither should any thing ever prevail with [Louisa] to do any thing so prejudicial to the interests of [Lady Lambton's] family into which she had been so kindly received”. But Sir Edward dies after being mortally wounded in an attack. Louisa is deeply saddened by this, and does not pursue anyone again “lest it should give rise to any hopes which could end only in disappointment”.

=== Lady Melvyn ===
Lady Melvyn helps house Louisa Mancel after she is rejected from the French boarding school due to a lack of vacancy. Lady Melvyn is married to Sir Charles, who is described as a “weak man". She was not interested in marrying him, but went through with it to make her parents happy. Her physical appearance is described as being “destitute of grace”; she does not have the pretty appearance like the other women, and her personality generally reflects this.

=== Mr. d’Avora ===
Mr. d’Avora is Louisa’s Italian teacher, hired by Mr. Hintman, who wanted her to learn the language. He is described as a man of intelligence and generosity who, having experienced a number of personal misfortunes, developed a more sensitive disposition and a strong understanding of others. Throughout the novel, he is consistently portrayed as kind in his conduct, and he shows particular affection toward Louisa.

== Historical context ==
=== Political ===
The gentry in the mid-eighteenth century was becoming increasingly more polarized, as political tensions rose between the mercantile and aristocratic classes. In Millenium Hall, the women all belong to upper class gentries, relaying the belief that they have power and authority over themselves as opposed to the patriarchy. The women found the power within themselves to break out of the patriarchal belief that men needed to run societies.

Stock markets grew significantly during this time. Those with the greatest influence and power owned land. Landowners were monopolizing the offices of the monarchy, leading to polarization. In the 1760s, the harvests were poor, food prices were high, and there were many accounts of unemployment.

Debates over the fundamental morality of the human soul were common at the time. Scholars suggest Scott fell on the side of the debate which held that humanity is moral by nature and that the path to happiness could be "achieved through prudent, benevolent action, and appropriate love of God's creatures."

==== Bluestocking Feminism ====
Millenium Hall was written around the time bluestocking feminism was becoming more common among upper- and middle-class women. Bluestocking feminism was a movement that enabled women of upper-class status to gather in informal settings and speak about topics with more depth than they normally would be afforded. Bluestocking feminism had a focus on uplifting the woman in her intellectual standards and educating her. Historically, women were not allowed to be the head of the family; a woman had to be subordinate to the head of the family, who was always the husband. A woman's husband was expected to provide for the family and be the lead, the dominant role. Yet women were expected to be the face of domesticity: they had to bring up the children and educate them in their early years, which seemed incongruent with the vision they had to fulfill of being subordinate. Bluestocking feminism critiqued and questioned this; it asked why women had to be perfectly domestic, raise her children mostly alone, and be financially (and oftentimes emotionally) dominated by her husband. So, upper- and middle-class women would sit in informal settings and talk about different literary and cultural topics, therefore feminizing the “masculine” conversation, which would typically only involve men as the interlocutors.

We can see a lot of the influence of bluestocking feminism in Millenium Hall. Much of the female characters are highly educated, and they are able and willing to discuss difficult topics with George Ellison and Mr. Lamont, like class and gender. The women also break from the expectation that they are to be financially dependent upon any man: They pool their funds and gather donations so they can rely on their own finances to run the Hall. They break away from a lot of the social norms expected of women at the time, though they stay a little obscure in their aims. At one point, Mrs. Mancel says that they are “not set[ting] up for reformers”, thus indicating that, yes, the messages of the Hall are rather charged toward feminism and women's independence from men, but they are not trying to reform or change the norms.

=== Literature ===
Significant novels of the time included Robinson Crusoe by Daniel Defoe and Gulliver's Travels by Jonathan Swift. These novels, like Millenium Hall, were marketed as true stories, a common legitimizing convention for fiction of the time. The English dictionary was also published in 1755, which was a remarkable achievement for the time. Romanticism in literature and culture was gaining traction, where inspiration and emotions were being drawn on to further one's thinking, a theme in Millenium Hall. The novel is a predecessor to Mary Wollstonecraft's Vindication of the Rights of Woman.

== Themes ==
=== Marriage ===
The women in the novel are largely unmarried. The only woman in the story who does marry is Miss Melvyn/Mrs. Morgan, though this is an arranged marriage by her stepmother who does not like her and did not have her best interests at heart, so this was not the best representative of marriages. Her husband ends up dying, after which she turns to Millenium Hall for community. The novel instead offers a “solution to the “problem of married and sexualized women.” Outside of Millenium Hall, there was an idealized domestic, married woman, because “once she was married she legally ceased to exist.” This is shown in the novel in how the women do not marry unless, like in Mrs. Morgan's case, they do not have a say in the matter. By being unmarried, the women are autonomous.

Millenium Hall was designed to give women an asylum in a society where they were meant to be married and have children. It has been discussed in literary circles that the women of Millenium Hall were asexual, and they did not want to marry because they had no sexual desire. Because of this, Millenium Hall was the answer to the question: What do we do with these women who are asexual (but still sexualized) and unmarried? This still allows women domesticity, even though they are not married, even a civil, governable society with rules and regulations that is without men and with like-minded women who understand the concerns and frustrations when they are constantly sexualized. So, this shows that women can still be unmarried and socialized, together, and liberated.

=== Female philanthropy ===
Historically, women were excluded from acts of philanthropy; it was seen as purely a male thing to do, with women only occasionally being able to take part in it. Other “novels of sensibility,” like Millenium Hall, had philanthropic themes within them, but the result of the philanthropy was always to help “victimized single women” find husbands. Millenium Hall, on the other hand, does not aim its philanthropic projects toward restoring single women to homes and family life again; instead, it makes the women of the Hall appear reasonable and “[establishes] philanthropy as a defining characteristic of the domestic woman and to sanction women's writing about social, political, and economic problems”. In conversations surrounding women and their roles in society, they oftentimes were subject to being seen in a one point perspective. For example, they were reduced only to their sexualities and their roles as wives and mothers. Scott's Millenium Hall changes this perspective by making all of Scott's main characters end up as husband-less and child-less women, therefore stripping them completely of their sexuality. In doing so, Scott privileges the scene of philanthropy as a space for “nonsexualized women,” thus subtracting the “masculine component” from philanthropy. In addition to using female philanthropy to de-sexualize the women in the novel, Scott uses it as a means of showing that women who are husband- and child-less can be something else other than an “old maid” or a “fallen woman”. Women like them can thrive and live a meaningful life without fulfilling the role of being a wife and/or a mother, and they can actively reject these labels of being “old” or “fallen” through engaging in the traditionally masculine realm of philanthropy.

=== Masculine self-centeredness ===
Sarah Scott emphasizes the difference between feminine sociability and “masculine self-centeredness” throughout Millenium Hall. The novel suggests that men, no matter how good they are, often end up getting in the way of their own virtue because of their self-centeredness. For example, Sir Edward Lambton is a very virtuous character: he is good looking and very kind (despite his insistence of marrying Louisa Mancel); he is the perfect man. However, his own virtue gets in his way: he ends up dying in battle due to his own “impatience”. Therefore, Sir Edward Lambton cannot achieve the idealized sociability that we see between the women of the novel. Female sociability, on the other hand, is associated with the community building the women of the Hall are doing, along with their philanthropy and various charitable acts (like taking care of disabled people and the elderly women of the community). Their sociability puts a great emphasis on their ability to be virtuous, to reason (reasoning is also innate to them, and not taught to them by men), and to be able to build a tight knit community. Prominent male figures in the novel like Mr Hintman show how the rest of the men in the novel do not possess these abilities: He is “virtuous”, so to speak, when he takes in young, newly orphaned Louisa Mancel. However, he is only virtuous up to a particular point; he quickly reveals his predatory nature once Louisa matures a little. This is when we see his perceived “sociability” turn into a masculine self-centeredness. Before we know it, Mr Hintman has revealed to Louisa and others that he has been preying on her the whole time, and does not have the deep care and concern for her that he appears to have when he first takes her in.

=== Religion ===
Millenium Hall by Sarah Scott was written during a time when Protestantism was prominent within England. This is apparent in the ways in which the women of the hall discuss marriage and intimacy. Among the hall, religion serves as a guiding principle for the characters, shaping their beliefs, actions, and interactions. In many of the stories of the women who live in the hall, religion and the Protestant views of the time are still important. In Mrs. Selvyn's story religion is prominent within the way she and her biological mother discuss sexuality. Selvyn's abstinence is viewed as a religious and moral choice rather than a choice linked to sexual preference.

== Content ==
Millenium Hall [sic] was Scott's most significant novel. It was popular enough to go into four editions by 1778, and interest in it has revived in the 21st century among feminist literary scholars. The book takes the form of a frame tale and a series of adventures, as the narrator's long-lost cousin relates how each of the residents arrived at the female utopia, Millenium Hall. The adventures are remarkable for their reliance on a nearly superstitious form of divine grace, where God's will manifests itself with the direct punishment of the wicked and the miraculous protection of the innocent. In one tale, a woman about to be ravished by a man is saved, literally by the hand of God, as her attacker dies of a stroke. The Hall the characters live in is a model of mid-century reform ideas. All the women have crafts with which to better themselves. Property is held in common, and education is the primary pastime.

Elizabeth Montagu, Sarah Scott's sister, had become a leader of the bluestockings, a coterie of reform-minded individuals. They believed in female equality, education, and limited economic justice. They were also active in prison and health care reform. Although Elizabeth may be lightly satirized in the figure of Lady Brumpton in Millenium Hall, the Hall is a fictional embodiment of bluestocking ideals.

At the same time, there is a notable critique of heterosexual sexuality in Millenium Hall. This antipathy is usually expressed in religious terms, as all of the sexual acts in the novel are either forms of rape or sin. Further, the characters in the novel who are married or who have children are so without any indication of romantic love between the partners. Instead of romantic love, the novel posits female friendship under a powerful duty to piety. Female friendship is constant, but it is also emphatically antiseptic by being non-sexual.

== Reception ==
Although Millenium Hall has received renewed attention, it is not a novel that participates in the tradition of the novel in general as traditionally defined by scholarship. Sarah Scott's novel is not primarily interested in character (as Samuel Richardson's had been or Frances Burney's would be) or social act (as Henry Fielding's had been) or entertainment (as Aphra Behn's had been). Instead, her novel is directed toward morality, example, and, to some degree, a polemic of female education. It seeks to reform the individual female who might the novel and engage the male reader in pity. As the subtitle to the novel says, it contains "Anecdotes and Reflections as May excite in the Reader proper Sentiments of Humanity, and lead the Mind to the Love of VIRTUE," with 'virtue' being understood in its masculine (virtus) and feminine (virginity) senses.
