= Sarah Scott =

English novelist (1720–1795)

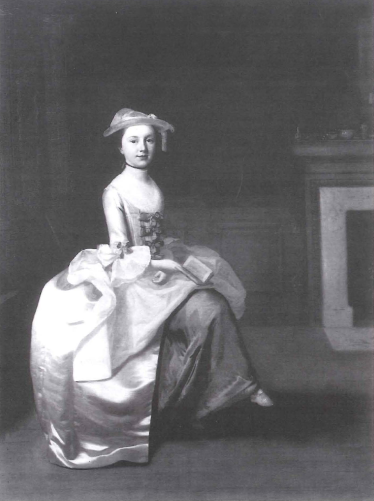
- Portrait of Sarah Scott, 1744 by Edward Haytley
- Born: 21 September 1720; Yorkshire, England
- Died: 3 November 1795; Norwich, England
- Occupation: Novelist

Sarah Scott (née Robinson; 21 September 1720 – 3 November 1795) was an English novelist, translator, social reformer, and member of the Bluestockings. Her most famous work was her utopian novel A Description of Millenium Hall and the Country Adjacent, followed closely by the sequel The History of Sir George Ellison.

== Early life ==
Sarah's father, Matthew Robinson, and her mother, Elizabeth Drake, were both from distinguished families, and Sarah was the youngest of nine children. Although born in Yorkshire, she spent much time with her siblings in Cambridge, England, where her grandmother, Sarah Morris Drake, lived with her stepgrandfather, Dr. Conyers Middleton, a famous scholar at Cambridge University. All but one of her brothers would go on to a highly accomplished career, yet her elder sister, who would later become the writer and social activist Elizabeth Montagu, became the most accomplished, earning fame in literary circles as a critic of Shakespeare and founder of the Bluestockings, of which Sarah also became a member. The sisters were emotionally close in their early years. Although Elizabeth was much more acclaimed as an author, Elizabeth often considered Sarah to be "superior in certain respects, particularly intellectual and literary interests, in which she encouraged her." The two regularly corresponded with each other in letters which have been preserved, along with other letters Sarah wrote throughout her life, discussing such matters as "French and English literature and histories, writing, translation, and politics." Sarah's letters also revealed an early love of literature, especially the works of Spenser, Sidney, Milton, Swift, and Voltaire.

Sarah contracted smallpox in 1741, a disease that would often leave its victims scarred and disfigured, "lowering [their] value in the marriage market." Scholars have traced the impact that smallpox left on Scott literary output: "Scott's pronounced concern [with deformity...] was motivated by her own experience of being left marked by a severe bout of smallpox [...], a trauma which had played a key role in redirecting her away from emulating the social success of her equally beautiful sister Elizabeth (Robinson), towards a life dedicated to writing, domestic female friendship and Christian philanthropy." Sarah would later create a fictional character in Millenium Hall who had the telltale marks of smallpox that diminished her complexion but not her character.

A year after Sarah's illness, her sister Elizabeth, after being befriended by Lady Margaret Harley and introduced to the highest circles of London life, married the wealthy 50-year-old Edward Montagu, grandson of the Earl of Sandwich. Sarah stayed home to tend to her mother, who was dying of cancer. After her mother died in 1746, Sarah visited Elizabeth and Edward in Bath. She chose to stay and care for the invalid Lady Barbara Montagu, or Lady Bab, with whom she developed a very close friendship. In 1748, the two women combined their finances and set up house together.

== Marriage ==
In the late 1740s, Sarah contracted to marry George Lewis Scott, a friend of the family from Canterbury who was twelve years older than she. He had no profession or private income, however, and Sarah's dowry amounted to only £1,500; so, before the two could wed, Sarah helped to secure George a position as a sub-preceptor to George, Prince of Wales (later King George III), who had lately succeeded his father, Frederick, upon Frederick's death in March 1751.

Sarah and George Lewis Scott were married on 15 June 1751. The marriage, according to family letters, was never consummated. In April 1752, Sarah's father and brothers came to London to remove her from her husband's house for undisclosed reasons. Speculations persisted of incompatibility, abuse, an illicit affair, or even nondisclosure of a prior marriage. It was also rumored that Sarah's friendship with Lady Bab and her insistence upon her friend moving into their household may have instigated the rift, or that Sarah had a personal aversion to marriage and/or conjugal relations. Regardless of the reason, the scandal if made public would have damaged George Scott's career; he agreed to pay Sarah a settlement of £100 a year.

When she was no longer with her husband, she became her father's charge, and he gave her no money at all. Further, he forbade Elizabeth or Sarah's brother Matthew from relieving Sarah's poverty.

Sarah and Lady Barbara Montagu settled in Bath and Batheaston, where they lived frugally and became active in helping the poor through the creation of a "cottage industry" for poor and disgraced women and children, and they organized programmes to educate poor children in such subjects as reading, maths, and needlework.

== Literary career ==
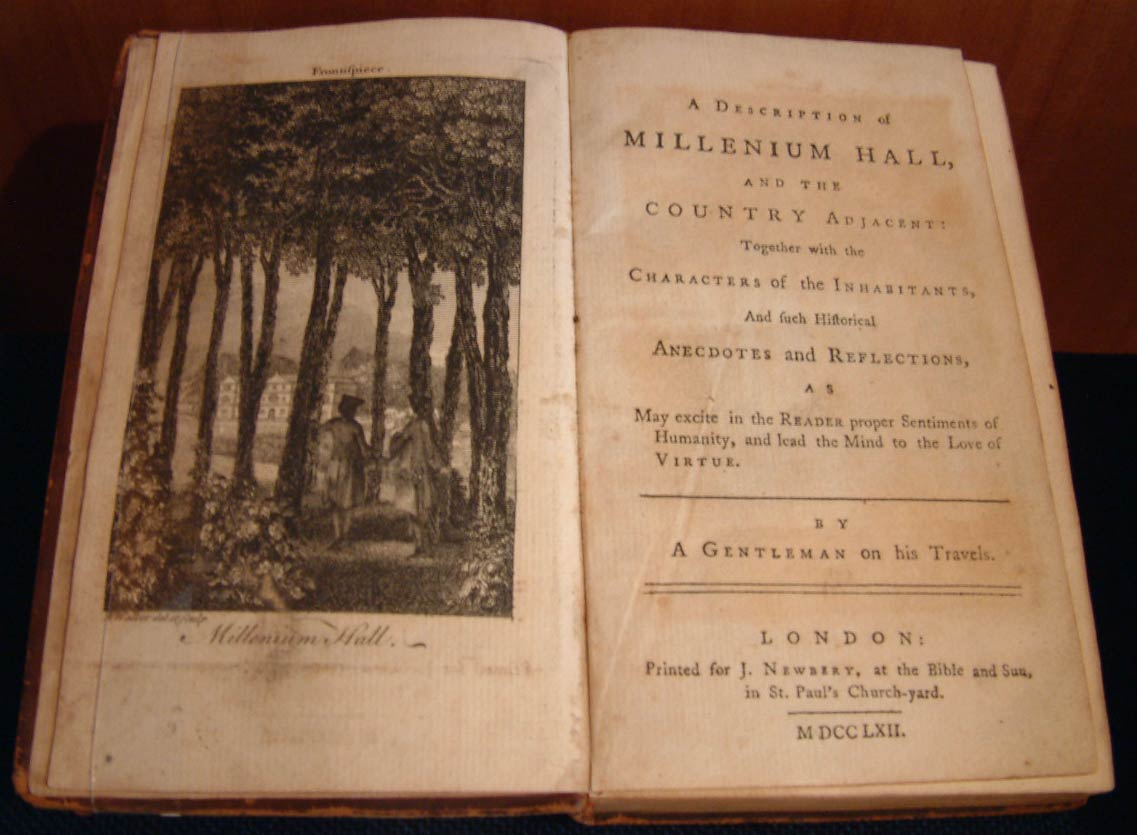
Frontispiece of Millenium Hall

Sarah wrote her first novel before her marriage, The History of Cornelia (1750), a portrait of an ideal and pious young woman. To help with the household expenses and philanthropy, Sarah decided to write and pursue "professional literary translation." In 1754, she translated Le Laideur aimable as An Agreeable Ugliness, an exaggeratedly moralistic French novel. Later that same year, she wrote A Journey through every Stage of Life, which is an Arabian Nights-styled series of tales told by a young servant girl to her mistress, a princess exiled by her brother.

After publishing her first novels and completing a translation of another, Sarah began to write educational texts. In the late 1750s, Sarah and Lady Barbara followed their earlier endeavors to educate poor children by writing a series of cards that concentrated on teaching history and geography. In 1761, with the accession of George III, Sarah wrote a political history about Gustav I of Sweden, The History of Gustavus Ericson, King of Sweden; it emphasized the concept of the "patriot king," or the selfless ruler acting for the greater good of the country. She succeeded this with The History of Mecklenburgh in 1762 to capitalize on the public's interest in George III's wife, Charlotte.

Also in 1762, Scott published her most successful novel, A Description of Millenium Hall and the Country Adjacent (her spelling). The utopian tale depicts a community of women devoted to artistic pursuits and education, Christian virtues, and philanthropy. The populations they serve include children, the poor, the elderly, the disabled, and the deformed. Millenium Hall provided a fictional example of the ideals of the bluestocking circle; the Bluestockings were a social group of middle- and upper-class men and women who would meet for intellectual discussions and philanthropic service. Like the Bluestockings, Scott's utopian novel presents a "critique of court politics, culture, and society." Millenium Hall went through four editions by 1778. Interest in its feminist aspects and implications brought it back into public attention in the late 20th century.

== Later life ==
In 1763, Lady Barbara gained a pension of £300, which floated the household finances sufficiently, and Sarah did not write for a couple of years. But with Lady Barbara's death in 1765 and with the encouragement and insistence of her sister, Sarah again began writing. The History of Sir George Ellison was published in 1766. This sequel to Millenium Hall portrays the eponymous narrator's "charitable deeds" inspired by his visit to Millennium Hall. His actions include "institut[ing] reforms on his plantations in Jamaica and devis[ing] schemes to relieve the poor in England, employing aged laborers on the grounds of his house, initiating a fund for the release of prisoners, and paying for the educations of females of different ranks." Again, the novel was utopian, but it also contained elements of the "patriot kings" that Sarah wrote about in her political writings.

The next year, Sarah attempted to create a real Millennium Hall in Buckinghamshire, a "communal household" that would include "a school and other charitable institutions for the impoverished community." Sarah invited fellow writer Sarah Fielding, among others, to come live with her. Each member invested £50 into the project. Sarah's sister Elizabeth Montagu donated livestock, land, and staff. Even though the project began with success, "financial difficulties, ill health, and quarrels between the members of the community led to the eventual dissolution of this real-life Millenium Hall."

After some work in translation and educational writing that was never published, Sarah published in 1772 The Life of Theodore Aggrippa d'Aubigne. As a response to emerging populism this work was about the life of a Protestant who fought against both mob rule and the absolute monarchy of the king. Sarah published in that same year her final novel, The Test of Filial Duty, which was an epistolary novel addressing the rights of a daughter to choose her husband.

In 1775, Edward Montagu, Elizabeth's husband, died, and Elizabeth gave Sarah £200 a year. In 1778, Sarah's father died, which gave her more money. She produced no more published works in her lifetime. After a lengthy illness, Sarah died on 11 November 1795 in Catton, Norwich. Per instructions Sarah left, most of her letters were destroyed by executor of her estate. By the 19th century, her name was largely forgotten, and her works were attributed to other writers, including novelist and playwright Oliver Goldsmith. Renewed interest in Sarah Scott and her work has emerged in recent literary criticism.

== Major works ==
All works below were published anonymously or under a male pseudonym.

- 1750 The History of Cornelia
- 1754 Agreeable Ugliness, or, The Triumph of the Graces; Exemplified in the Real Life and Fortunes of a Young Lady of Some Distinction, trans. of Le Laideur aimable by Pierre Antoine, Marquis de La Place
- 1754 A Journey through every Stage of Life, Described in a Variety of Interesting Scenes, Drawn from Real Characters. By a Person of Quality
- 1761 The History of Gustavus Ericson, King of Sweden; With an Introductory History of Sweden, from the Middle of the Twelfth Century (pseudonym: Henry Augustus Raymond, Esq.)
- 1762 The History of Mecklenburgh, from the First Settlement of the Vandals in that Country, to the Present Time; including a Period of about Three Thousand Years
- 1762 A Description of Millenium Hall and the Country Adjacent, Together with the Characters of the Inhabitants and such Historical Anecdotes and Reflections as May Excite in the Reader Proper Sentiments of Humanity, and Lead the Mind to the Love of Virtue
- 1766 The History of Sir George Ellison
- 1772 The Life of Theodore Agrippa d'Aubigné, Containing a Succinct Account of the Most Remarkable Occurrences during the Civil Wars of France in the Reigns of Charles IX, Henry III, Henry IV, and in the Minority of Lewis XIII
- 1772 The Test of Filial Duty; In a Series of Letters between Miss Emilia Leonard, and Miss Charlotte Arlington: A Novel
