= Satan's Harvest Home =

1749 pamphlet published anonymously

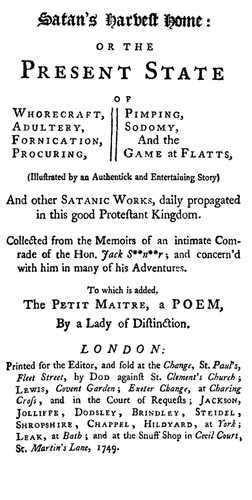
- Author: Anonymous
- Language: English
- Subject: 18th century British society and morality
- Publisher: Published for the editor
- Publication date: 1749
- Publication place: England
- Media type: Pamphlet
- Pages: 62

Satan's Harvest Home is a pamphlet published anonymously in 1749 in London, Great Britain. It describes moral laxity and perversion of contemporary society, especially effeminacy, sodomy, and prostitution. The pamphlet incorporates some older material that attempts to diagnose the cause of a perceived increase in the prevalence of sodomy among gentlemen. It specifies a continental European origin for both male effeminacy and same-sex relations between females. The pamphlet also features a poem, "Petit Maître", denouncing male habits of feminine dress.

Contemporary scholars have found in the pamphlet evidence of several Early Modern British trends: the equation of effeminacy with homosexuality; the use of Sappho as a symbol for lesbianism at a time when public awareness of lesbian relationships was increasing; and an equation of Roman Catholic Italy and France with moral degeneracy.

== Outline ==
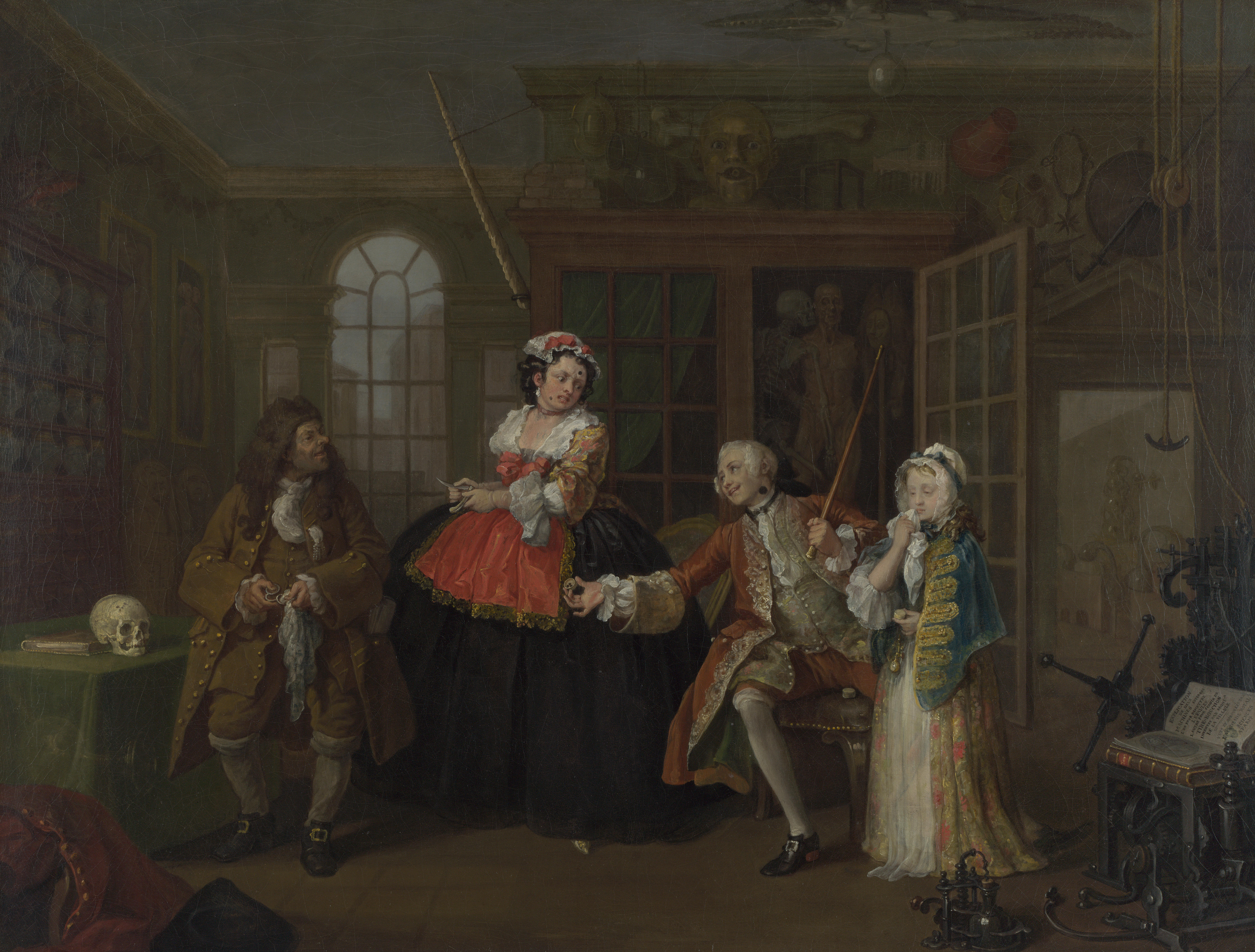
William Hogarth's Visit to the Quack Doctor, from the 1743–45 Marriage à-la-mode series, shows a fashionably-dressed young gentleman and a prostitute – both targets of opprobrium in Satan's Harvest Home

The pamphlet's full title is Satan's Harvest Home: or the Present State of Whorecraft, Adultery, Fornication, Procuring, Pimping, Sodomy, and the Game of Flatts, (Illustrated by an Authentick and Entertaining Story) And other Satanic Works, daily propagated in this good Protestant Kingdom. It was printed "for the editor" – i.e. at the expense of the person who compiled it – and it was available for sale at locations across London, from several sellers in York, and in Bath.

Some of the material in the pamphlet appears to be either a straight reprint or plagiarism of older material, including from a 1734 text, Pretty Doings in a Protestant Nation, by the pseudonymous Father Poussin. Part of the same section also seems to have appeared in William Walsh's 1691 A Dialogue Concerning Women. Another reused source is a c.1731 (1720 in some sources) pamphlet, Plain Reasons for the Growth of Sodomy in England.

=== "Reasons for the Growth of Sodomy" ===
In a section apparently reprinted from earlier publications, the pamphlet discerns "Reasons for the Growth of Sodomy" in a number of aspects of British culture. It claims that, in past ages, British middle-class gentlemen had led moral, industrious lives, serving King, country, and family. This era, the pamphlet claims, was now past and lost; the constitution of the gentleman has deteriorated. Contemporary infants, it says, faced grim prospects, being pampered in nurseries by mothers who dominated their weak fathers. Such children, the pamphlet argued, could not help but to grow up effete and were "scarcely worth raising." Some of the blame for this, the pamphlet claims, lay with the increasing popularity of raising children at home and having them educated by women, rather than sending them to school or to be apprenticed. Lacking the boisterous companionship of other boys, they could not acquire manly traits; governed by women, they never learned to dominate women themselves, which, the pamphlet claimed, was requisite to please a wife.

=== Male effeminacy and sodomy ===
One chapter of the pamphlet describes the physiognomy of the "sodomitical type", claiming that gentle, soft, and delicate men are predisposed toward sodomy. The next chapter criticizes the feminine dress and hairstyling of young men whom it describes as "those Gentlemen who call themselves pretty Fellows". It characterizes their appearance, in which men styled their hair and dressed in a manner similar to their footmen. (In contemporary Britain, fears about the consequences of homosexual relationships often centred on their perceived tendency to ignore (and thus weaken) class boundaries: an effeminate gentleman who dressed like his footman, a servant, embodied this class transgression in a threatening way.) The habit of wearing makeup, the pamphlet says, was "as much in Vogue among our Gentlemen, as with the Ladies in France." Italian opera, too, is criticized for its attributed tendency to feminize men.

The same chapter describes same-sex kissing, particularly between men, as the most hateful product of effeminacy. It claims the phenomenon originated in Italy and France, in the latter of which it says even nuns acted lasciviously together, and decries it as an "Unmanly, Unnatural Usage... the first Inlet to the detestable Sin of Sodomy". The fashion for male public kissing, the author claims, allowed "catamites" to approach men openly in the streets.

Sodomy itself, the pamphlet says, was widespread and becoming more so, and the numerous prosecutions represented likely just a fraction of the total incidents: "We have but too much reason to fear, that there are Numbers yet undiscovered, and that this abominable Practice gets Ground every Day."

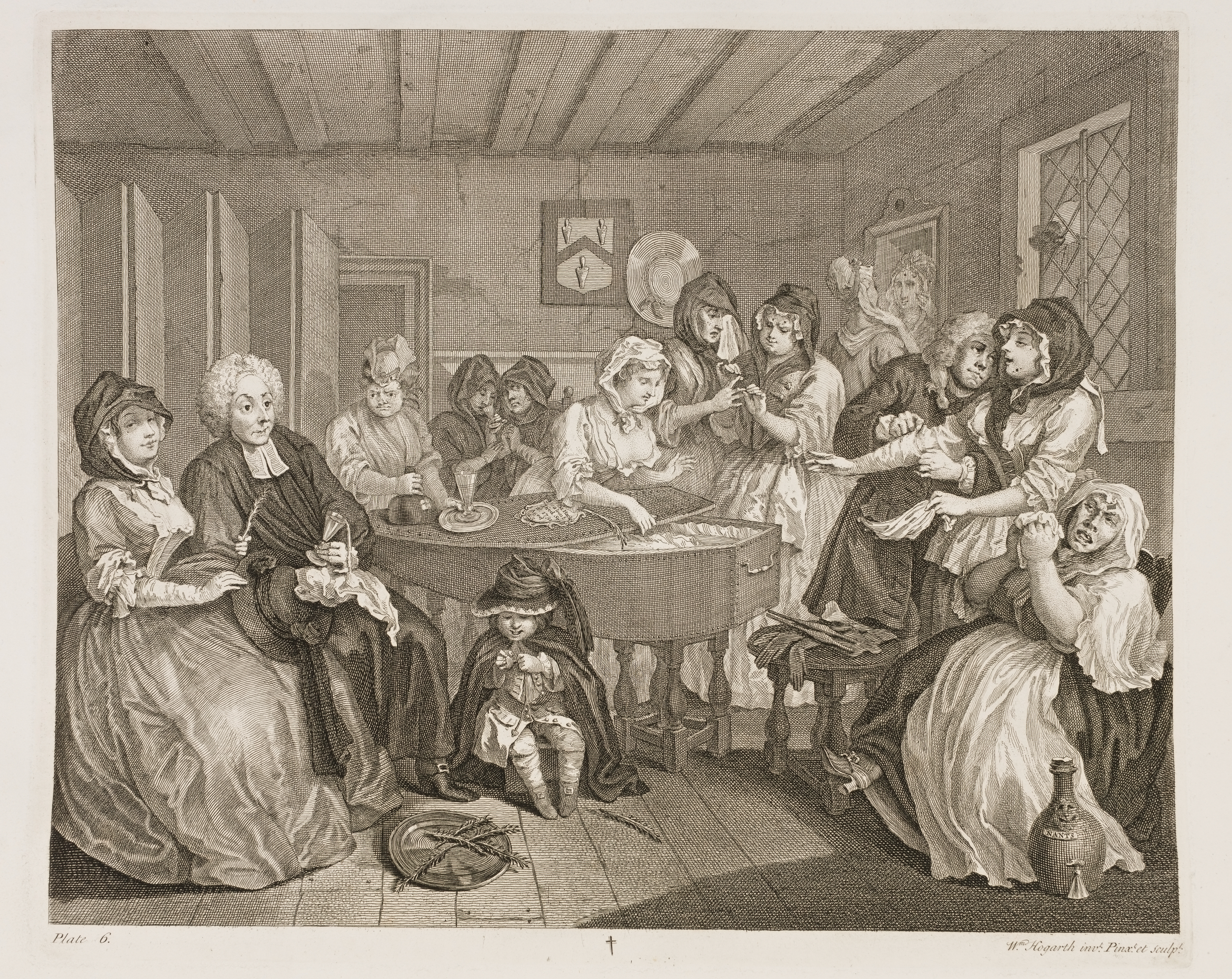
Plate Six of Hogarth's 1731 A Harlot's Progress: vices underway at the funeral of a prostitute

=== Female homosexual activity ===
Same-sex activity between women was also targeted. The pamphlet appears to have plagiarized the "Father Poussin" text to blame Sappho for devising the "Game of Flats", a "new sort of Sin", which has been interpreted to refer to sexual contact between women (i.e. tribadism, a form of "flat" contact, without the presence of protuberant male genitalia). This activity, the book claims, is popular both "in Turkey" and "at Twickenham".

=== Prostitution ===
The pamphlet claims the streets of London were astonishingly full of prostitutes, male and female, to the extent that whole districts – such as Drury Lane, which purportedly housed 107 brothels in the early 18th century – were exclusively inhabited by prostitutes:

...quite up to St. Thomas's-street (some few honest shopkeepers excepted) is a Corporation of Whores, Coiners, Highwaymen, Gamesters, Pick-pockets, and House-breakers, who like Bats and Owls skulk in obscure Holes and Geneva shops by Day-Light, but wander in the Night in search of Opportunities wherein to exercise their Villany. (Page 25)

Though the pamphlet describes the pitiable and desperate conditions in which prostitutes lived, and the corruption of the police supposed to patrol them, it also accuses prostitutes of 'Inhumanity' and deems them devilish and monstrous. The vices of the prostitute are presented as those endemic among all women.

=== "Petit Maître" ===
The pamphlet concludes with a poem, "Petit Maître", criticizing a man with an effeminate appearance. The style has been characterized as satirical. The final verse not only exhorts men to dress in a masculine style, but suggests that the effeminate are in any case less than manly:

If thou art a Man, forbear
Thus, this motly Garb to wear;
Do not Reason thus displace,
Do not Man-hood thus disgrace;
But thy Sex by Dress impart,
And appear like what thou art:
Like what thou art, said I, pray pardon me;
I mean, appear like what thou ought'st to be.

== Reception ==
Some modern analyses have characterized the pamphlet as a "best-seller" in its own time. Its familiarity today may also derive from its inclusion in several 19th-century bibliographies: it was listed in W. T. Lowndes's pioneering Bibliographer's Manual of English Literature, published 1834, generally regarded as the first such systematic literary bibliography. The pamphlet was also the subject of an extensive entry in the 1877 Index Librorum Prohibitorum of the pseudonymous Pisanus Fraxi (really Henry Spencer Ashbee), an encyclopedia of erotic literature. The Index reproduced substantial portions of the original text, introducing the work as a "rare volume, its object being strictly moral."

Modern scholars have attended to the pamphlet as an example of contemporary attitudes toward homophobia, effeminacy, prostitution, and even international relations. David Robinson characterizes the pamphlet's contents as "blatant, vituperative homophobia", and the Encyclopedia of Homosexuality identifies it as an effort to incite anti-homosexual sentiment. Christopher Hobson presents pamphlets of this type as the handmaid of eighteenth-century English judicial crackdowns against homosexual offenders; as a mechanism whereby homosexual behaviour was kept indefensible, and potential perpetrators kept terrified.

Ian McCormick diagnoses the pamphlet as representing a gradual change in European discourse on the character of the sodomite: previous publications had discussed sexual deviance (conceived in contemporary terms) as a general evil; with Satan's Harvest Home a new attention was brought to the individual character of persons who committed sodomy. He argues that 'before the seventeenth century, sodomy was not even precisely differentiated from its demonic associations with werewolves, heretics, sorcerers, and the like. Increasingly, however, it came to be linked with pride, excess of diet, idleness, and contempt of the poor.' The pamphlet's equation of effeminacy with homosexuality is identified by Michael Kimmel as distinctive for the period.

Other scholars have identified the text's tone as satirical and mildly obscene, locating it among a movement of pamphlets influenced by a counter-trend promoting greater sympathy for prostitution. Linda Dowling interprets the pamphlet less a broadside against sodomites, and more as evidence of a strand in rhetoric that valorized Britain's martial past and saw lack of respect for it as a precondition for vice. Ian Bell considers the causality of this relationship between moral collapse and vice, characterizing the book as part of strand that saw vice as a product, not a cause, of a fundamental collapse in morality in Augustan London.

Many scholars have considered the pamphlet as evidence for an association, in eighteenth-century thought, between same-sex vice and the influence of continental (and specifically Roman Catholic) European mores, particularly of those from France and Italy. George Haggerty sees the pamphlet as typical of a trend in eighteenth century British discourse that blamed Italy and France for exporting sodomy to Britain; Valerie Traub notes its references to "foreign contagion... the criminal amorousness endemic to France and Italy.".

George Rousseau, similarly, cites the pamphlet as part of a body of 1740s "sodomy" literature so wide-ranging as to suggest that the term's meaning might have been mutable, broad, and vague. He argues specifically that, in the 1740s, the term had a strong connotation of an imported vice; it was often used in the 1740s to connote suspicion against foreigners. The pamphlet's text, on page 50, includes the strident claim "Damn'd Fashion! Imported from Italy amid'st a Train of other unnatural Vices. Have we not Sins enough of our own, but we must eke 'em out with those of Foreign Nations, to fill up the Cup of our Abominations, and make us yet more ripe for Divine Vengeance?" The plausibility of the theory that "sodomy", however understood, was particularly prevalent in Italy is difficult to assess, though Trevor Dean notes that, earlier, seventeenth-century Italy had undergone increasingly vigorous efforts to monitor and regulate sexual activity.

Historians of lesbianism have cited the work as early evidence of public awareness that a lesbian culture existed within eighteenth century England, and locate its references to Sappho as early indicators that that term was coming into general usage to describe lesbians.

== Publishing history ==
Garland of New York produced a facsimile edition of the pamphlet in 1985. An original edition is held in the British Library.

- First edition: Anonymous (1749). Satan's Harvest Home: or the Present State of Whorecraft, Adultery, Fornication, Procuring, Pimping, Sodomy, And the Game of Flatts, (Illustrated by an Authentick and Entertaining Story) And other Satanic Works, daily propagated in this good Protestant Kingdom. Printed for the editor, and sold at the Change, St. Paul's, Fleet Street, by Dod; Lewis; Exeter Change, and in the Court of Requests; Jackson, Jolliffe, Dodsley, Brindley, Steidel, Shropshire, Chappel, Hildyard, at York; Leak, at Bath; and at the snuff shop in Cecil Court, St. Martin's Lane.
- Facsimile edition: Anonymous (1985). Randolph Trumbach (ed.). Hell Upon Earth, or The Town in an Uproar; And Satan's Harvest Home. Marriage, Sex, and the family in Eighteenth Century England 1660–1800. Vol. 20. Garland.

== See also ==
- 18th century in literature
