= The Governess; or, The Little Female Academy =

First novel for children, 1749

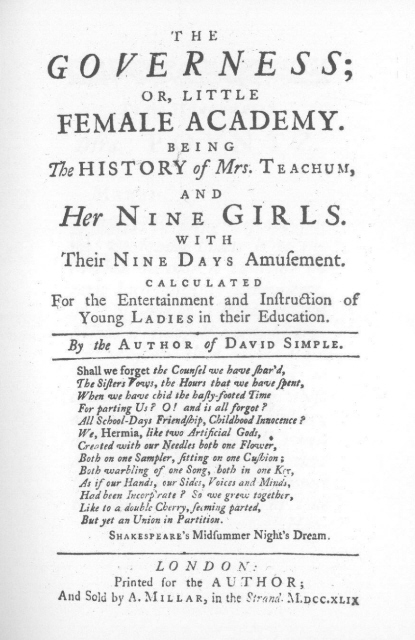
Title page from the first edition of Fielding's The Governess

The Governess; or, The Little Female Academy is a novel published in 1749 by Sarah Fielding. It is the first full-length novel written for children, and is a significant work of 18th-century children's literature.

== Overview ==
Frontispiece to Mrs Sherwood's 1820 revised edition of The Governess

The Governess, or The Little Female Academy is a book about a boarding school run by Mrs Teachum. The story takes place over ten days, not including some initial background information and an epilogue. On each day except for the first, all or part of a text is read aloud to students by Miss Jenny Peace. Afterwards one or more of the pupils is physically described, followed by an account of their life story. These are written to appear as if spoken by each girl and recorded by Miss Jenny. Each session of reading is capped by an appearance from Mrs Teachum, who explains the lesson to be learnt from each experience. Emphasis is given to the importance of reading and to reflecting on the reading.

The plot of The Governess seems largely based upon the Lockean educational ideal of avoiding learning as work or a job, and instead presenting it as something enjoyable. Thus Fielding employs fairy tales as well as everyday occurrences (receiving a letter, meeting strangers, touring fancy houses) to educate her pupils in a living life full of happiness.

Mary Martha Sherwood published a revised edition in 1820, replacing the story of "Barbarico and Benefico" with "The History of the Princess Rosalinda" and omitting "The Princess Hebe."

== Summary ==
=== Preface ===
In her preface, the author says:

My young Readers, Before you begin the following Sheets, I beg you will stop a Moment at this Preface, to consider with me, what is the true Use of Reading; and if you can once fix this Truth in your Minds, namely, that the true Use of Books is to make you wiser and better, you will then have both Profit and Pleasure from what you read. One Thing quite necessary to make any Instructions that come either from your Governors, or your Books, of any Use to you, is to attend with Desire of Learning, and not to be apt to fansy yourselves too wise to be taught. For this Spirit will keep you ignorant as long as you live, and you will be like the Birds in the following Fable:

"The Mag-pye alone, of all the Birds, had the Art of building a Nest, the Form of which was with a covering over Head, and only a small Hole to creep out at.—The rest of the Birds, being without Houses, desired the Pye to teach them how to build one.—A Day is appointed, and they all meet.—The Pye then says, "You must lay two Sticks across, thus."—"Aye, says the Crow, I thought that was the way to begin.—Then lay a Feather, or a Bit of Moss.—Certainly, says the Jack-Daw, I knew that must follow.—Then place more Sticks, Straws, Feathers and Moss, in such a manner as this.—Aye, without doubt, cries the Starling, that must necessarily follow; any one could tell how to do that." ...

"The Reason these foolish Birds never knew how to build more than half a Nest, was, that instead of trying to learn what the Pye told them, they would boast of knowing more already than he could teach them: And this same Fate will certainly attend all those, who had rather please themselves with the Vanity of fansying they are already wise, than take Pains to become so. But take care, that instead of being really humble in your own Hearts, you do not, by a fansied Humility, run into an Error of the other Extreme, and say that you are incapable of understanding it at all; and therefore, for Laziness, and sooner than take any Pains, fit yourselves down contented to be ignorant, and think, by confessing your Ignorance, to make full Amends for your Folly. This is being as contemptible as the Owl who hates the Light of the Sun; and therefore often makes Use of the Power he has, of drawing a Film over his Eyes, to keep himself in his beloved Darkness."

The preface closes with the explanation that the following 'sheets' are intended to show young readers that "Pride, Stubbornness, Malice, Envy, and, in short, all manner of Wickedness, is the greatest Folley we can be possessed of", and "Certainly, Love and Affection for each other make the Happiest of all Societies."

=== The Beginning ===
The opening of the novel illustrates how Mrs Teachum's school came into being. She was married to a man that enjoyed 'improving' his wife by educating her, and Mrs Teachum had a disposition towards pleasing her husband, and received his instructions with enthusiasm. When her husband died, he was happy to leave his children in the care of his well educated wife. It was not to be. Within 12 months of the loss of her husband, Mrs Teachum would also suffer the loss of both of her children to fever. During this time, the banker in possession of her money would go bankrupt, leaving Mrs Teachum without her expected support, and in need of income. "Therefore, by the advice of all her Friends, she undertook what she was so well qualified for; namely, the education of children."

In the first scene at her school, Mrs Teachum intended as a gift to her 9 pupils a basket of apples. She is called away before she is able to distribute the apples, and leaves them in the care of Miss Jenny Peace, her eldest student. Jenny is told to make sure that the present is divided evenly, and it should have worked out perfectly, except that one apple appears to be substantially larger than the others. The students begin to clamour to be the one given the larger prize. The noise made by the students was too much for Jenny to overcome. Her decision was that none should have it, and so threw it over the hedge. Instead of solving the problem this leads to a rather large scrum among the girls, involving kicking, biting and pulling of hair over who should have had the apple. As Miss Jenny is attempting to break them up, Mrs Teachum returns to a scene of complete chaos. The children attempt to blame each other for causing the fight, none willing to take the responsibility. The narrative does not explain the method of Mrs Teachum's punishment, but describes it as "the most severe Punishment she had ever inflicted on these wicked Girls, who had been thus fighting, and pulling one another to Pieces, for a sorry Apple."

The punishment does not serve to reform the children, however it does give them time, and the mindset, to be reasoned with. A dialogue is recorded between Miss Jenny and another student, Miss Sukey, in which Miss Jenny eventually convinces a reluctant Miss Sukey that each person had some fault in the fight, and that her time might be better spent attempting to make peace than plotting schemes for revenge. After some time alone, Miss Sukey realises that Miss Jenny is right and apologises. Miss Jenny is overwhelmed, and uses this moment to convince the others in the group to work together, not against each other. Miss Jenny produces a basket of apples that she had spent her own pocket money to buy and offers them to the group as a reward for the good behaviour.

Miss Jenny then proposes to tell of her life before coming to the school, so that the other girls might understand her better. She also stipulates that each girl should have her turn to tell her story for the same reason. The stories of each of the girls is different, but the main theme holds true. Each girl now being able to see the way they behaved before was not acceptable, they pledge to do better, and are glad that the girls are friends now instead of enemies.

==== The Life of Miss Jenny Peace ====
Her father died when she was only a year old, leaving her with her mother whom she calls 'the Best Woman in the World, and to whose Memory I shall always pay the most grateful Honour.' Her mother raised under the constant reminder that goodness and happiness lived within the same heart. Her mother had 6 children, but only two lived past one year. Jenny and her brother, Harry, often quarrelled, but their mother took pains to teach how much more they could enjoy life if they agreed. She also attempted to show neither any favouritism, and to treat them as equals. Jenny relates how from the moment they were able to think, they made it their rule to obey their mother, as soon as she made it known what she wanted. One day, this immediate obedience saved her brothers life by his quick response to her wishes. Another time, she and her brother quarrelled over something small, that she compares to the fight over the apple. Her mother shows her how shameful she is behaving, first, rather than ordering her to make amends with her brother. She realised her unreasonable stubbornness and was the first to apologise. Harry and Jenny were so close, that it was enough for either one that the other was pleased. Jenny finishes by saying that it would be an endless story to relate all of the good parcels of wisdom her mother had given her, but not before she tells the story of how she came to realise that she was in control of her own feelings. She had found a cat, that became hers and followed her everywhere. One day, some cruel boys chased her cat, and hunted it to exhaustion. The next day the cat crawled back to the house and died at Jenny's feet. She became for a long time inconsolable. Jenny's mother gave her some time to grieve, but eventually told her that, if she would obey her mother as she should, she would remove all signs of sadness and grief from her. Jenny's mother knew that she would obey her enough to at least pretend, but warned her that she could tell the difference, and expected full compliance. She then left Jenny to think about what she had said. While alone Jenny realised that she could indeed be the master of her feelings, and she was doing no good for anyone around her in the state she was in.

=== Monday ===
In the morning, Jenny gathers her new friends about her and proposes that they spend their free time that afternoon reading a story together. They all agreed, and Jenny reads to them the story of the evil giant Barbarico, the good giant Benefico, and the dwarf Mignon.

==== Barbarico and Benefico ====
In the story, Barbarico is a giant that kidnaps humans to torture. One day, he encounters the young lovers Fidus and Amata. He grabs both of them and tells them that to avoid instant death they must tell him who they are and what they are doing. Fidus tells them that they are young lovers, asks to not be separated from Amata. Barbarico tells him that he needn't worry, as he would eat Fidus very shortly after Amata, so as to cause as little grief as possible. Benefico manages to see his evil Brother and confront him. Barbarico is afraid of his brother, throws Fidus over his shoulder, and Amata in the river to cover his tracks as he runs away.

Barbarico imprisons Fidus in his cave, and tells his slave, the dwarf Mignon, to only feed him moldy bread and standing water once a day, as he wishes to watch him starve. Mignon takes pity on Fidus, having been made a captive at the age of five, and secretly feeds him good food and water. This begins a friendship between Mignon and Fidus, that would eventually lead to their escaping together. Mignon is careful to not be discovered, but Barbarico becomes suspicious when Fidus remains healthy. Mignon is eventually caught, and Barbarico threatens to eat him. He does not eat him, however, as he remembers his purpose in keeping him for so long – "that he might never want an Object at hand to gratify his Cruelty." The giant chooses to imprison Mignon instead. Mignon escapes after realising his door was left open, and finds a magic fillet that can paralyse the giant. He places it around Barbarico's neck, frees Fidus, and they escape. The pair run to Benefico with the news, and beseech him to act while Barbarico is vulnerable. Benefico slays his evil brother with one stroke, after seeing that he cannot convince Barbarico to repent. Amata and Fidus are reunited and married. Mignon turns out to be Amata's long lost brother. All of the fear that once ruled the kingdom being now gone, all are let to live happy and productive lives.

==== Monday's Moral Lesson ====
After finishing the story with her friends Jenny takes it to Mrs Teachum, and asks for her approval of having read it to her classmates, citing her mother's insistence that there was a very good moral in the tale. Mrs Teachum assures Jenny that she has no problem with any text that they should choose to read, provided they do so in the correct view. Mrs Teachum explains that it must be understood that the tale is a fantasy. (Giants do not exist.) She also points out the quality of writing, having used specialised diction for the parts of Barbarico and Benefico to show the difference in their nature. Mrs Teachum then cautions to ensure that the girls do not get carried away with fanciful thoughts due to the tale. Jenny takes this to mean that she has chosen poorly, and Mrs Teachum assures her that it is not the content of the story that matters, but how it is read and viewed that decides whether or not it is appropriate.

=== Tuesday ===
On Tuesday, Jenny gathers her friends during their break after morning classes. They all agree that they had enjoyed the tale, but Jenny wants to make sure the teachings from Mrs Teachum are passed on, and that the girls understand what they read. To accomplish this they each speak on which part of the tale they enjoyed. There is disagreement between the girls, and Jenny, fearful of another quarrel, cuts off the discussion. She contends they should think about the moral of the story, and how they might learn from it, rather than which part they liked the best. She says: "In short, if you will reap any Benefit from this Story towards rendering you happy, whenever you have any Power, you must... do good with it; And when you are under any Sufferings.. you mus patiently endure them till you can find a Remedy." Before supper, Miss Dolly Friendly declares that she has a story she would like to share with the group the next day.

==== The Life of Miss Sukey Jennett ====
Her mother died before she could remember her, and her father remarried quickly. The new wife wanted a new family, without a reminder that she was not Mr. Jennet's first wife, and so Sukey was typically left to the care of an old servant. She was a favourite of the servant's and, in her eyes, could do nothing wrong. Sukey became very spoiled. She had a playmate, the daughter of one of the other servants, that she would be cruel to whenever she felt in a poor mood. If the girl complained, it only made her angrier that the girl would dare to challenge her. No matter her position, she thought hers to be the right, and anything else wrong – until she came to the school. The girls at the school were different, as they all thought of her as an equal. She spent most of her time thinking on how to get back at her classmates without being caught. She had hardly any peace or happiness because of this, and was quite happy that they were now attempting to become friends.

It is here that Mrs Teachum approaches, and Sukey breaks off her story. Not wishing to influence how freely the girls are willing to share, she instead has Jenny visit her after supper. Mrs Teachum instructs her to write down the stories of the girls lives, not for mere curiosity, but so that she may be better able to understand their dispositions. In the evening, the children seated themselves again, and could hear the sounds of a child crying and being beaten by a woman. Jenny called out to the woman, and asked her to stop as it was upsetting the youngest, little Polly Suckling. The woman replies that she would, as she does not regularly hit her child, except when the girl is guilty of lying to her, as in this case. They begged a reprieve for the girl, provided she promised not to lie again, and went back to their meeting. Miss Jenny here claimed her abhorrence of lying and liars. It is here that Miss Dolly raises her hand and claims that she was often guilty of this in the past.

==== The Life of Miss Dolly Friendly ====
Miss Dolly lived until the age of 9 with a sister one year older than her. They were close enough that whatever Molly did, Dolly did. Dolly was prepared to fight for Molly, lie for her, or anything else that Molly might have required. There was no such thing as 'too far' for Molly. In her defence, Dolly claims that what she did, she did in defence of her sister. Dolly tells the group that her sister had grown sick and died, right before Dolly came to the school, but that the habit of standing up for her friends was still with her. This is why she entered into the quarrel over the apple.

=== Wednesday ===
After morning lessons the students prepare to gather again to hear Miss Dolly's story, but are delayed by their writing instructor appearing early. He wished to leave early as well, and Mrs Teachum bade the students attend him, saying, "And I know my little Dears, you would rather lose your own Amusement, than let anyone suffer a real Inconvenience on your Accounts." As a reward for their willingness to change their plans, Mrs Teachum allows them to leave afternoon classes an hour early to hear Miss Dolly's story.

==== The Story of Caelia and Chloe ====
Caelia and Chloe were cousins who became orphans at the age of 6. They both went to live with the same aunt. Neither were provided for in the absence of parents, but their aunt took great pleasure in taking care of them, particularly in educating them. Their aunt, Amanda, however, was a very wealthy woman. She had no children of her own, so it was expected that the two girls would inherit should she die. Therefore, they had no shortage of suitors. However, they had no interest in any of them, and, having rejected so many, were soon called 'jilts.' This changed when they were both 22 years old, and a military regiment came to be camped near their estate. A lieutenant-colonel, 34, happened to be in the regiment who had served under Chloe's father, and so he had an interest in meeting his daughter. His name was Sempronius, and both Chloe and Caelia took an interest in him. He liked both, but had no preference of one over the other. He also enjoyed that they did not spend their time attempting to out do the other. To solve this problem, he devised a plan. He approached Chloe first. Sempronius told Chloe that he had a strong inclination to marry Caelia, and asked Chloe if she knew of any such quality that might make her less than a pleasing wife. Chloe, despite being a close friend to Caelia, gave into temptation and told Sempronius, that, if she had a fault, it was that of a temper sparked from envy. Sempronius then sought out Caelia and asked her the same question. She resisted any temptations and witnesses that she has yet to find any fault with Chloe. Sempronius presses her stating that he has a particular dislike of treachery and envy, and would like to know if Chloe had ever displayed either. Caelia assures him that she is free of both faults. He then asks Caelia what she thinks Chloe's reaction to these questions might be, and, to her credit with Sempronius, Caelia says, "That she verily believed her Cousin would say as much for her as she really deserved; but whether that would be equal to what with Justice she could say of Chloe her Modesty left her in some doubt." Sempronius is so taken with Caelia's honesty and modesty, that he reveals the true answers of Chloe, and in the same breath asks for her hand in marriage. During this Chloe is walking nearby, and guesses the result of their conference. She decides to listen to their conversation. Sempronius declares Chloe a false friend to Caelia, but Caelia has already forgiven Chloe. She asks that Sempronius do so, as well. Hearing this, Chloe is overwhelmed with guilt at her treachery. She repented and wondered how to set things right. To go and ask forgiveness would require that she disclose that she had been eavesdropping, and she could not bring herself to lie again and say she was not. This bothered Chloe until she was overtaken with fever. Chloe's guilt, and Caelia's need for Sempronius to forgiver her friend, delays the marriage until amends can be made. On her death bed, Chloe now feels as though she can be trusted to be truthful once more. She confesses her misdeeds, and wishes Sempronius and Caelia only happiness. Caelia forgives her, and Chloe's recovery is quick and remarkable. Sempronius, who had been away on duty, returns and there is now no impediment to their marriage.

==== The Life of Miss Lucy Sly ====
Lucy tells a story similar to Miss Sukey. Her mother was so ill that her raising was entrusted to a governess. It was the governess' habit to blame someone else for Miss Lucy's misdeeds. So much so, that Lucy began to believe that she was truly never at fault, and that anything contrary to her wishes was the actual wrong. In one instance, Miss Lucy broke a cup and hid it in a foot boy's room. The next day she overheard her governess remarking that she knew what Lucy had done, and had never seen a girl with more cunning. Lucy took this to be a sign that she had done the right thing. She continued this life until she came to Mrs Teachum's school where it was a great surprise to her that she could not do such things without consequences.

=== Thursday ===
As the students gather after class, Miss Jenny announces that she has not prepared any entertainment for their session, but hopes that someone else will follow Miss Dolly's example and provide some material for them to think about. Miss Sukey says that she has a letter from her cousin and would like to share it with the group as she found it both 'strange and remarkable.' Upon the completion of Miss Sukey's reading, Miss Patty Lockit exclaims, "What Thanks can I give you, my dear Friend, for having put me into a Way of examining my heart, and reflecting on my own Action; by which you have saved me, perhaps, from a Life as miserable as that of the poor Woman in Miss Sukey's Letter!"

==== Peggy Smith's Letter ====
Miss Peggy Smith writes about the passing of an old woman that had lived nearby her house. The woman's name was Dison, and she was continuously in a state of melancholy that everyone assumed was due to chronic illness. She lived near Peggy for five years with her health slowly deteriorating. On her death bed, Dison revealed that her health was deteriorating because she harboured so much ill will toward her two sisters, who had married young and well. In her search to have a suitor undeniably better than those of her sisters, she often waited too long before accepting an offer, and thus lost her chance. She never revealed her misery or its cause to her sisters, but felt compelled to ward Peggy of the consequences of envy.

==== The Life of Miss Patty Lockit ====
Patty came from a large family, and considers it to be an average life with them. Sometimes they fight, sometimes they play, and their parents treated them all the same. When she was six her grandmother offered to take her into her home to raise her as a companion to another girl she had taken in, Molly Bradley. Molly was four years older than Patty, and her parents had taken great care in her education. Molly was given much attention by the people around her, and Patty soon felt ignored and became jealous. Patty says that had she heard of this story before she had left she might have put these emotions aside and attempted to learn from Molly. She remembers being teased by a maid named Betty, who would say that it was a lack of spirit that allowed Patty to not think herself every bit as good as Molly and allow herself to be taught by another child. So Patty resolved to learn nothing from Molly, and eventually her grandmother decided to send Patty away to school. This only made Patty's problem worse, as instead of one person she might have reason to be jealous of, she now had many.

That day after dinner, Mrs Teachum explains that, while she is happy that the girls are employing their free time so wonderfully, they could also do with some exercise. The girls resolve to walk together to the dairy house, and because of their cheerful compliance Mrs Teachum excuses them from afternoon classes. They meet an old woman at the dairy house afflicted with a palsy, and the girls ask some questions that might be considered rude, but the woman takes no offence. They enjoy their time at the dairy house, and walk home. On the way home they meet a man who appears to be homeless. He explains his story to the girls, and Mrs Teachum is happy to see that they are quick to give him aid. She warns them, however, to be careful as some men will lie to receive charity and avoid honest work.

=== Friday ===
On this morning, Miss Jenny enters Mrs Teachum's study to ask her permission to read a certain story to her friends. Mrs Teachum is delighted at Jenny's good sense. Mrs Teachum assures her that she has shown that she understands their conversation on Monday night, and tells Jenny that she has earned her trust. Jenny replies that she hopes never to lose it. Jenny hurries to her group and explains to them the story she wishes to read. The group has become accustomed to doing whatever Jenny decides, and they readily agree with one exception. Miss Polly Suckling wonders if it might be better to read some true history so as to be able to learn something from it, rather than a fairy tale. At this Jenny replies with a story. When Jenny was six, a man travelled to her village in possession of a curiosity that the whole town came out to see, but Jenny thought it beneath her to do so. Even when her mother gave her permission, she refused to go. Her mother laughed and told her, that she had already been to see it, and enjoyed it. Then Jenny's mother taught her that she should avoid 'affectation' to not become contemptible. Miss Polly sees her wisdom and, blushing, agrees to hear the story.

==== The Princess Hebe ====
There was a king who had a brother, and each of them married to a princess. The king and queen gave birth to a daughter, Hebe, while his brother was unable to conceive. This caused a great feeling of jealousy between the queen and her sister-in-law. The king eventually died from fever, leaving the queen with a little girl to raise by herself. With the king dead, the prince came to believe he should rule, and ordered the queen and her daughter executed on the false story that she had poisoned the king. The queen was warned in time, and she escapes. As morning comes, the queen's servant suggest that they find cover, and hide in the woods. The queen despairs of losing her husband, and is about to give up when she spots the fairy of the woods, Sybella. Sybella conjures up a carriage and they are transported to her grove of trees with a magical entrance. Upon reaching safety, the queen is again overcome by grief. Sybella sees how full of emotion she is and waits for her to calm herself over some time. When the queen eventually realises that life will go on, Sybella begins to relate the history of her life.

Sybella's father was a magician who married a beautiful woman. They had two daughters, Brunetta and Sybella. Sybella's mother implored her father to use his magic to bless Brunetta (the eldest) so that she might be successful in whatever she does. The magician sees a problem with this, and only wishes to do so if the blessing only works when she does good things. The wife proved more stubborn, and the magician did as asked. When Sybella was born, he began to prepare her to deal with the tyrant that she knew Brunetta would become. He told Sybella of Brunetta's gift, and told her that he would give her a greater one: the power of strength and constancy of mind, to endure the ills of Brunetta, who was encouraged by their mother.

On a day in which Brunetta was being particularly evil, the magician chastised her for her behaviour. This caused his wife, who was again pregnant, to go into a rage, convulse, and die. The grief of losing his wife, also caused the magician to die. However, before he died he gave Sybella a magic wand that, when used, would give her whatever she desired as he suspected that, once he was gone, Brunetta would not be long in disinheriting Sybella. Brunetta is smart, and manipulates the situation so that it eventually looks as though Sybella has wronged her, and chases her from the kingdom. At which point she hastened to the very woods she now occupied, which magically act as a safe haven repelling all who would do her harm. After finishing her story, Sybella offers to bestow Princess Hebe with any blessing the queen might desire, trusting to the queen's experience to only desire good. The queen asks Sybella to endow Hebe with the wisdom to see the value of the things around her, and to always follow goodness. She blesses Hebe and warns her to not trust any of the shepherdesses around the forest, as they are agents of Brunetta and wish Sybella and her friends no good. An old man then appears and asks for Sybella's help in reforming his abusive and wayward son. Sybella offers to help without going to see the boy, but the man is insistent that she must come with him. She reluctantly agrees and leaves her forest.

At this point, Mrs Teachum appears in the group and tells them to break for the day.

=== Saturday ===
On this day, Mrs Teachum listens in on the ending of the Princess Hebe story.

==== The Story of Hebe (cont.) ====
The queen hears a song being sung beautifully, and seeks out its source. It turns out to be one of the shepherdesses (that they were warned about) who seeks to befriend Princess Hebe. Her name is Rozella. Hebe invites her new friend to the grove, against her mother's wishes as they had been asked never to bring anyone into Sybella's forest. They play together for the morning when Rozella claims that she must be home by noon, but would love for Hebe to come and visit her home one day. At first the queen is hesitant of allowing this. The queen does not like Rozella's influence on Hebe, and warns her to be careful of temptations that look like goodness on the surface, but are a trick. She compromises and allows Hebe to meet Rozella in the meadow, but not to go to her home. One day, as Hebe and Rozella were walking together, Rozella asks Hebe why she should not be able to do something that she likes, if it causes her harm. Hebe argues that just because the harm is not perceived does not mean it is not there, and will not be dissuaded even by Rozella's best arts. Rozella changes tactics and declares her argument a joke, but asks Hebe to keep it a secret from her mother as she will look poorly in the story. When Hebe says she cannot keep a secret from her mother, Rozella is able to guilt her by suggesting that the queen will never allow them to be together if she knew. Hebe agrees, but struggles to bear the secret within her. The next day Hebe meets Rozella and declares that she must do what is right if she is to be happy. Rozella tries the same tricks as before, and, as she has deviated from goodness once, she is able to bear it easier now. She agrees to go to Rozella's home, and Rozella's assures her that she will be back before her mother expects her. As they prepare to leave, however, a snake appears and scares Hebe enough to run home to her mother. Hebe here tells of the snake, and confesses of her intentions to disobey. The queen shows Hebe that Rozella is no true friend, and Hebe agrees not to see her any more. Hebe is sad for a while, and asks for a chance to prove her obedience to her mother, and her ability to withstand any temptation, by walking on her own around the forest. She encounters Florimel, who has been tied to a tree by the wicked Rozella. Florimel turns out to be just as wicked and steals Hebe's necklace that contained a picture of her father. Hebe chases and is led to Brunetta's castle. At first, Brunetta is kind to Hebe. She offers to let her stay, and Hebe is saturated in the greatest joys and pleasures, that she does not have time to think. After three days, everything changes, and now all of the people are wicked and cruel. She is taunted and ridiculed. Back in the grove, Sybella returns to see the queen in grief. The man she went to help, turns out to be a phantom sent by Brunetta to lure her away, and she already knows what has happened to Hebe. Hebe would often walk to within sight of the grove, but would be ridiculed and taunted by Brunetta's court until she turned around to prove that she was not so very good. Sybella takes to walking around the castle hoping to see Hebe and convince her to come back to the forest. Hebe is eventually overwhelmed by guilt and grief, and is chased from the castle by the teasing of the others. Sybella finds her, comforts her and convinces her to come home. Hebe wishes to never have such temptations again, and for three years she lives a quiet and peaceful life. Then news arrives that the queen's sister-in-law is dead, and Hebe's uncle wishes Hebe to take the throne. Hebe is scared of a public life and the temptations to evil that it brings. Sybella tells her that this doubt is a good thing, as her overconfidence is what led to her down fall. Also that, if the good intentioned Hebe does not take the throne, a worse person might. Hebe agrees to take the throne, and is a good queen.

==== After the Story ====
The girls talk about the story, and Miss Jenny notices how much nicer they behave toward each other this time, than after the story of Benefico and Barbarico. After supper, Mrs Teachum tells them that she is happy of their innocent joys, but would like to them to consider more seriously what could be learned from the story. She points out that the queen was only told Sybella's story after she was calm enough to listen, where we learn that by our own flaws we can turn our advantages into misery. She then takes care to point out how the story was set up, and to distinguish the features of setting, plot, and moral of the story so that the girls might, in the future, be able to do so on their own.

=== Sunday ===
On Sunday Mrs Teachum gathered her students early and walked them to church. At church they met two friends of Miss Jenny from before she came to the school, Lady Caroline and Lady Fanny. The father of Caroline and Fanny had just recently inherited a title on the death of his brother, and a large estate. The two girls had become quite vain in their appearance, particularly in their dress. So much so that when Miss Jenny attempts to mock the Lady Caroline in a subtle way, by overusing her title and focusing on her extravagant clothing, Caroline is oblivious. The Lady Fanny was much taken with her reflection in the mirror and would constantly turn her body for a different angle. After the two Ladies are gone, Miss Nanny Spruce remarks that she was glad to have met them so that she can now see how ridiculous she behaved in the past. She then tells her story.

==== The Life of Miss Nanny Spruce ====
Miss Nanny explains that she has always had a great interest in fine clothing. Her every thought concerned when she might be given a new piece to wear. She lived in a poor country parish, and her father was the only gentleman. As such, she had much finer things than the other girls around her. She would allow the more well off children to play with her, but would not allow those dressed in rags anywhere near her. She felt very content in this life, as none of the other children ever had a pretense to be her equal, but this was changed completely by her arrival at the school. She would make plots against the other girls at the school to lower them in status, but would always be foiled. She is much happier now that they can be friends.

==== The Life of Miss Betty Ford ====
Miss Betty Ford tells of life with her much prettier sister. While Miss Betty did not really believe herself to be plain, everyone around her paid so much more attention to Pretty Miss Kitty (her sister). In spite of this, Miss Kitty was kind to Miss Betty and never insulted her. Still, Miss Betty could not love her, and would sometimes lie about Miss Kitty. When Miss Kitty died, Miss Betty cried along with everyone, but for company more than grief. Miss Betty lived relatively happily until she came to school, and was instantly jealous of all of the girls who were prettier than her. She now realises that the problem is not the other girls beauty, but her own insecurity. She is then reminded by Miss Jenny that the beauty of the eagle is in its beak and talons. This causes Miss Betty to be happy that she did not have it within her to do harm with her gifts.

=== Monday ===
The next morning as the girls walk in the Garden, Miss Jenny notices that Miss Dolly is on the verge of tears. As it turns out she has read a sad play, and would like to share it with her friends so that they can understand her mood. The name of the play is called ""Funeral, or Grief A-la-mode."" The play itself is not actually read in the text. Perhaps because Fielding's readers would have been familiar with the play. At the close of the play, while the girls are still 'drying their eyes' Mrs Teachum appears and asks what they were reading. Fearing trouble, they plead that she might not judge them too harshly for their choice of text today. Mrs Teachum is actually pleased that they are reading a play, as she wishes that they should have familiarity with all of literature. She decides to test their understanding of the play, as she it is one that she knows well. At first the girls all defer the answer towards Miss Jenny, but Mrs Teachum excludes her from answering for the group. The girls still refrain from answering, out of shyness, but are saved from volunteering by Miss Jenny suggesting Miss Sukey, as the next oldest. At Mrs Teachum's urging, Miss Sukey replies: "If I understand your Commands, Madam, by telling the Story of the Play, you would not have me tell you the Acts and Scenes as they followed one another; for that I am afraid I can hardly remember, as I have heard it only once; but I must describe the People in the Play, and the Plots and Contrivances that are carried on amongst them." Mrs Teachum nods and Miss Sukey begins her summary of the play. After she is finished, Mrs Teachum commends her memory and then explains that this exercise is a useful tool to help remember things we have read. She then asks Miss Jenny what she believes to be the moral that should be learned from this play. Jenny hesitates for a great moment before answering, but is correct according to Mrs Teachum, who then begins to quiz her about specific instances in the play where this may or may not be true.

==== The Life of Miss Henny Frett ====
She had one brother, just like Miss Jenny. However, Henny's relationship to her brother was not one of friendship, like Jenny's to her brother. Miss Henny's 'praise or blame' was constantly in comparison to her brother. If she were to do poorly, she would be told that her brother (George) would never do such a thing. If George left on vacation, Henny was jealous that she was not to go, and would gloat when the turn was hers. Henny had a better memory than her brother, and whenever she learned something new would immediately go to George to prove how much smarter she was. The problem with that is she was just acquiring information for the sake of repeating it and lowering George's status, not learning it and incorporating it into useful knowledge for the future. The play has led her to see this for the truth.

==== The Life of Miss Polly Suckling ====
At the end of Miss Henny's story, Miss Polly was afraid that she was going to be left out of her turn at telling her story. She was determined to get her chance, but much preferred being asked. She remarked on how lovely it was that each girl had had their turn, and Miss Jenny recognised that it was now hers. Miss Polly does not remember much before coming to the school. At heart she has always been one to try to be agreeable, and so she was just following the examples of the rest of the girls. Also, being the smallest, she was always afraid they were going to take advantage of her size. Now that they are all friends she is much happier.

=== Tuesday ===
On this morning Jenny collected all of the stories of her classmates, and took them to Mrs Teachum. Mrs Teachum was impressed when she read them, saying, "For they have all confessed their faults without Reserve; and the untowardly Bent of their Minds, which so strongly appeared before the Quarrel, has not broke out in these their little Histories; but, on the contrary, they all seem, according to the Capacities, to have endeavoured to imitate your style, in the account you gave of your own life. I would have you continue to employ your leisure House in the manner you have lately done... as I hope to hear from you...that I shall have no cause to repent my indulgence." Mrs Teachum dismissed Miss Jenny and allowed the girls the chance of another afternoon walk to the destination of their choice. At dinner she asked them where they should like to go, and with excited longing from Miss Polly Suckling they decided to see the old lady at the dairy house again. Mrs Teachum would not be accompanying them, and they would be under Miss Jenny's supervision. When they arrived at the dairy house, Mrs Nelly (the daughter of the old woman) wondered aloud how wild the girls would be without their governess here. Miss Jenny assured her that she would have no cause to regret their visit, and indeed Mrs Nelly did not. On the walk back they came in view of a nobleman's house, and were invited in by the maid to take a tour since the owners had left separately that morning. Not wishing to appear rude, they accepted and marvelled at the many things inside of the house. When they returned home, they asked why it is that the owners were separated. Mrs Teachum at first thinks gossip is a waste of time, and beneath them. However, she relents as to give them some wisdom when choosing their own husbands. The couple had married for money, and while they had more than either could ever want, they were unhappy and could be heard fighting most days. As such, it proves that 'grandeur and happiness do not always go together.' Mrs Teachum then handed Jenny a piece of paper and bid her to read it out loud.

==== The Assembly of the Birds ====
A long time ago the different species of birds would argue over which species was truly superior. They agreed to bring the issue before the eagle, so that he might make a ruling. The first to plead their case was the parrot, who claimed his ability to speak like a human, and that he lived in a golden cage set him above the other birds. The eagle replied that the parrots voice was weak because of his mimicry, and that his cage was more a cell than a sign of status. He also asked why the bird was so skinny if he was so great. The parrot's owner was sick, and his servants had forgotten to feed him. Next was the Daw, who had dressed himself up in a collection of stolen feathers. Such was the sight that all of the other birds began to pluck the feathers. Naked, the Daw was even more embarrassed than the Parrot and quietly slipped away. Next was the peacock, who thought to show off his natural beauty. However, the moment the peacock stepped forward, the nightingale began to sing so beautifully the peacock was ashamed of his image and left. The nightingale was very impressed with himself, and in his pride did not notice the hawk swooping down to clutch the nightingale in his claws and carry him off. Of this the eagle proclaimed, "That as the peacock's Envy had taken away all his Claim, so no less had he Nightingale's Self-conceit frustrated all his pretensions; for those who are so wrapped up in their own Perfections, as to mind nothing but themselves, are forever liable to all sorts of Accidents." Next was the owl, who proposed that he was considered the wisest by all birds. When the eagle asks for proof, the owl refers to the other birds, who promptly tell the eagle that the owl calls himself wise and they have never bothered to correct him. The eagle dismisses the owl on a false claim just as the daw. Lastly, the eagle notices that the dove is missing and he goes in search of the dove. The eagle and his friends come upon the doves nest as she is singing to her children, and waiting for her mate to bring food. Upon hearing the song about how true her love is for her mate, the eagle instantly pronounces her the happiest of birds.

==== Miss Jenny Receives A Letter ====
Upon finishing the story, there is a knock on the door. Mrs Teachum goes to answer it, and returns with a letter for Miss Jenny. The letter states that her aunt has found a place to live and request that Jenny come and live with her and her daughter. She is to leave in the morning. The other girls are instantly saddened upon the news, and Jenny attempts to cheer them up with little success. Mrs Teachum instructs her girls not to grieve over her leaving, but to cherish the memories of Miss Jenny, and therefore have joy instead of sadness.

=== The Conclusion ===
Miss Jenny Peace never again returned to the school, but, even long after the girls who knew her were gone, Mrs Teachum delighted to tell the story of Miss Jenny Peace and the wonderful example she set for her fellow school mates.

== Characters ==
Mrs Teachum is described as "about 40 years old, tall and genteel in her Person, tho' somewhat inclined to Fat. She had a lively and commanding Eye, insomuch that she naturally created an Awe in all her little Scholars; except when she condescended to smile... then she had something perfectly kind and tender in her Manner."

Miss Jenny Peace is 14. She is the oldest of the group, and its de facto leader. She is average height, "But her whole Person was the most agreeable that can be imagined." There may be prettier girls in the group, but her schoolmates' "Eyes were a direct contradiction to their Tongues, by being continually fixed on Miss Jenny."

Miss Sukey Jennet not quite 12 years old. Nearly as tall as Miss Jenny, but much thinner because of her fast growth. "From an assured Air in the manner of carrying herself, she was called much the genteelest Girl." A certain 'fierceness' appears in her eyes when being argued with.

Miss Dolly Friendly is 11 years old. "Neither plain nor handsome; And though she had not what is properly called one fine Feature in her Face, yet the Disposition of her Features was so regular, that her countenance was rather agreeable, than otherwise."

Miss Lucy Sly of an age with Miss Dolly friendly, but shorter 'by half the Head.' Considered pretty due to 'fine black Eyes' that give her a cunning look, and fine black hair. An overlarge chin is the only flaw in her features.

Miss Patty Lockit is "10 years old; tall and inclined to Fat." She lacked any sort of grace, but was still considered to have handsome features. She possesses large brown eyes, rosy cheeks and light brown hair. Her mouth was slightly too large, but the quality of her teeth when she smiled cancelled any negative from it.

Miss Nanny Spruce only 9 years old and the complete physical opposite of Miss Patty – very compact and small. She was lame in one hip, but managed to be mobile enough not to let it hinder, but rather just to appear as an odd gait.

Miss Betty Ford is also 9. Much the same size as Nanny. Considered the plainest girl in school with a broad face that freckled in the summer, and red hair.

Miss Henny Frett is 9 years old, and 'very prettily made.' She is also remarkably elegant for her age. She had a natural disposition that caused her to show her upper teeth when threatened, and this had become so exacerbated at the school, that it seemed almost permanent. Now that the girls are friends, her beauty can be seen more clearly.

Miss Polly Suckling has just turned 8, but is regularly mistaken for a girl of 5 due to her small size. Her body was well proportioned, just small. Her size, and a little bit of plumpness gives her the look of a cherub.
