= Sarah Fielding =

English author (1710–1768)

- Born: 8 November 1710; East Stour, Dorset
- Died: 9 April 1768 (aged 58); Bath, Somerset, England
- Occupation: Novelist
- Relatives: Henry Fielding; John Fielding
- Writing career
- Pen name: "the author of David Simple"
- Period: 1744–62
- Genres: Sentimental literature, children's literature, biography, literary criticism
- Movement: Enlightenment

Sarah Fielding (8 November 1710 – 9 April 1768) was an English writer and sister of the playwright, novelist and magistrate Henry Fielding. She wrote The Governess, or The Little Female Academy (1749), thought to be the first novel in English aimed expressly at children. Earlier she had success with her novel The Adventures of David Simple (1744–1753).

== Childhood ==
Sarah Fielding was born at East Stour, Dorset in 1710 to Edmund Feilding [sic] and his wife Sarah, née Gould (died 1718), after Henry and Ursula; her younger siblings were Anne, Beatrice, and Edmund. Sarah's father, Edmund, the third son of John Feilding, was a military officer and relative of the Earls of Denbigh (his father, John, had been the youngest son of the 3rd Earl). Although Edmund spelled his last name "Feilding" as often as "Fielding," both Henry and Sarah spelled the name "Fielding." When asked by an Earl of Denbigh why, Henry Fielding said, "I cannot tell, my Lord, except it be that my branch of the family were the first that knew how to spell". Sarah Fielding's mother, Sarah Gould, was the daughter of Sir Henry Gould, a judge on the King's Bench who had been reappointed to the Queen's Bench. This descent is important for understanding the early life and education of Edmund Feilding's children.

Edmund left the care of his children to his wife's mother, Lady Sarah Gould, while he built his career in London. The children grew up in her home in Glastonbury and their paternal grandfather's house in East Stour (John Feilding being a latitudinarian Cambridge-educated parish priest with three livings, who had been considered for a bishopric in Ireland. Henry was sent to Eton, but all of the daughters were sent to Mary Rookes's boarding school in Salisbury. This was "non-academic, but she was later extremely well read in Greek, Latin, French and English."

When Edmund's first wife (Fielding's mother) died in 1718, Edmund married Anne Rapha, a Roman Catholic widow, who brought with her several children, and later bore Edmund a son and half-brother for Henry and Sarah, the future reformer John Fielding. Sir Henry and Lady Sarah Gould (Fielding's maternal grandparents) had fallen out with Edmund before the death of the children's mother. Lady Gould was highly displeased with Edmund's second marriage, and Anne Fielding (née Rapha) was the subject of much anti-Catholic sentiment from the elder generation of the family. Lady Gould was so set against Anne and her enlargement to the family that, in 1721, she sued for custody of the children and ownership of the family house in East Stour. She eventually won, leaving the children unable to see their father for some years.

== Writing career ==
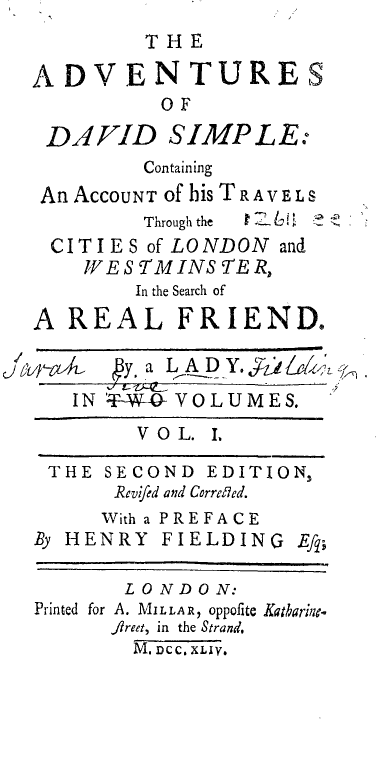
Second edition of The Adventures of David Simple, to which Henry Fielding affixed a preface

In the 1740s, Fielding moved to London, sometimes living with her sisters and sometimes with her brother Henry and his family. The women of the family lacked sufficient money for a dowry, and consequently none married. Even when Lady Gould died in 1733, there was little money for the children.

Fielding turned to writing to make a living, beginning while she lived with her brother and acted as his housekeeper. In 1742, Henry Fielding published Joseph Andrews, and Sarah Fielding is often credited with having written the letter from Leonora to Horatio (two of the characters in the book). In 1743, Henry Fielding published his Miscellanies (containing his life of Jonathan Wild), and his sister may have written its narrative of the life of Anne Boleyn.

In 1744, Fielding published a novel, The Adventures of David Simple in Search of a Faithful Friend. As was the habit, it was published anonymously, while pleading financial distress. The novel was quite successful and gathered praise from contemporaries, including the publisher and novelist Samuel Richardson. As a "moral romance", it features two disinherited couples. Both heroines point to "the stifling of women's intellect and the barriers against a gentlewoman's earning her living." It was followed by the Familiar Letters (1747) of the two couples and by a Volume the Last added to a later edition (1753). Richardson, who was himself the target of Henry Fielding's satire, said that he thought Sarah and Henry were possessed of equal gifts of writing. The Adventures of David Simple went into a second edition within ten weeks, and was translated into French and German. The title pages to Sarah Fielding's other novels often carried the advertisement that they were written by "the author of David Simple". The novel was sufficiently popular that Fielding wrote Familiar Letters between the Principal Characters in David Simple as an epistolary furtherance to the novel in 1747. In 1753, she wrote a sequel to The Adventures of David Simple entitled David Simple: Volume the Last.

David Simple was one of the earliest sentimental novels, featuring a wayfaring hero in search of true friendship who triumphs by good nature and moral strength. He finds happiness in marriage and a rural, bucolic life, away from the corruptions of the city. Simple is an analogue, in a sense, of the figure of Heartsfree, in Henry Fielding's Jonathan Wild and Squire Allworthy in his Tom Jones. However, he also shares features with other sentimental figures who find peace only with escape from corruption and the harmony of a new Utopia. In her Volume the Last, however, Fielding's fiction, like Henry Fielding's, is darker and shows less faith in the triumph of goodness in the face of a corrosive, immoral world.

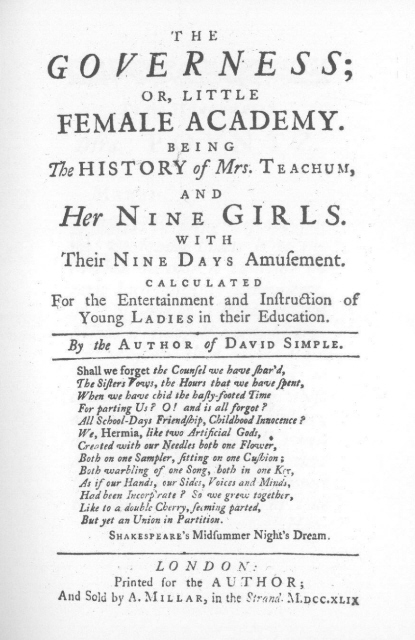
Title page from The Governess, or The Little Female Academy (1749), by Sarah Fielding, the first full-length novel written for children

Sarah Fielding wrote three other novels with original stories. The most significant of these was The Governess, or The Little Female Academy (1749), which is the first novel in English written especially for children. In addition, she wrote The History of the Countess of Dellwyn (1759) and The History of Ophelia (1760).

As a critic, Sarah Fielding's Remarks on Clarissa (1749) concern the novel Clarissa by Samuel Richardson. As a biographer, she wrote The Lives of Cleopatra and Octavia (1757), a history, written from Greek and Roman sources, on the lives of Cleopatra and Octavia, two famous women of Roman times. As a translator she produced Xenophon's Memoirs of Socrates, with the Defense of Socrates Before His Judges (1762), a work by the Ancient Greek writer and soldier Xenophon concerning the philosopher.

== Final years ==
Fielding's sisters died between 1750 and 1751 and Henry in 1754. Fielding retired from London and moved to a small house just outside Bath. The philanthropist Ralph Allen and Elizabeth Montagu (a member of the Blue Stockings Society) gave her some financial aid. In about 1767, the novelist Sarah Scott, sister of Elizabeth Montagu, invited Fielding to come and live with her in a female utopian community, as an attempt to create the utopia described in Millenium Hall, but Fielding declined. She died in 1768. There is a memorial plaque to her on the west porch of Bath Abbey.

== Works ==
Internet Archive links are to the first edition of each work; other editions may be available.

=== Novels ===
- 1744 – The Adventures of David Simple, Books I to IV — at the Internet Archive, volume 1 and volume 2
- 1747 – Familiar Letters between the Principal Characters in David Simple — at the Internet Archive, volume 1 and volume 2
- 1749 – The Governess, or The Little Female Academy — at the Internet Archive
- 1753 – The Adventures of David Simple, Volume the Last, Books V to VII — at the Internet Archive
- 1754 – The Cry: A New Dramatic Fable (with Jane Collier) — at the Internet Archive, volume 1, volume 2 and volume 3
- 1757 – The Lives of Cleopatra and Octavia — at the Internet Archive
- 1759 – The History of the Countess of Dellwyn — at the Internet Archive, volume 1 and volume 2
- 1760 – The History of Ophelia — at the Internet Archive, volume 1 and volume 2

=== Non-fiction ===
- 1749 – Remarks on Clarissa — at the Internet Archive
- 1762 – Xenophon's Memoirs of Socrates, with the Defence of Socrates Before His Judges — at the Internet Archive

=== Doubtful attributions ===
- 1750 — The History of Charlotte Summers, the Fortunate Parish Girl — at the Internet Archive, volume 1 and volume 2
  In some respects a pastiche of Tom Jones and a considerable success in its day, the anonymous Charlotte Summers has traditionally been attributed to Sarah Fielding, but scholars now generally believe that "nothing but conjecture" links her to the novel, or even that it is "certainly not" her work.
- 1753 — The History of Betty Barnes — at the Internet Archive, volume 1 and volume 2
  While Fielding's supposed authorship of Charlotte Summers was for a long time accepted as fact, the attribution of Betty Barnes has always been more tentative.
