= Robert Pollard (engraver) =

English engraver and painter

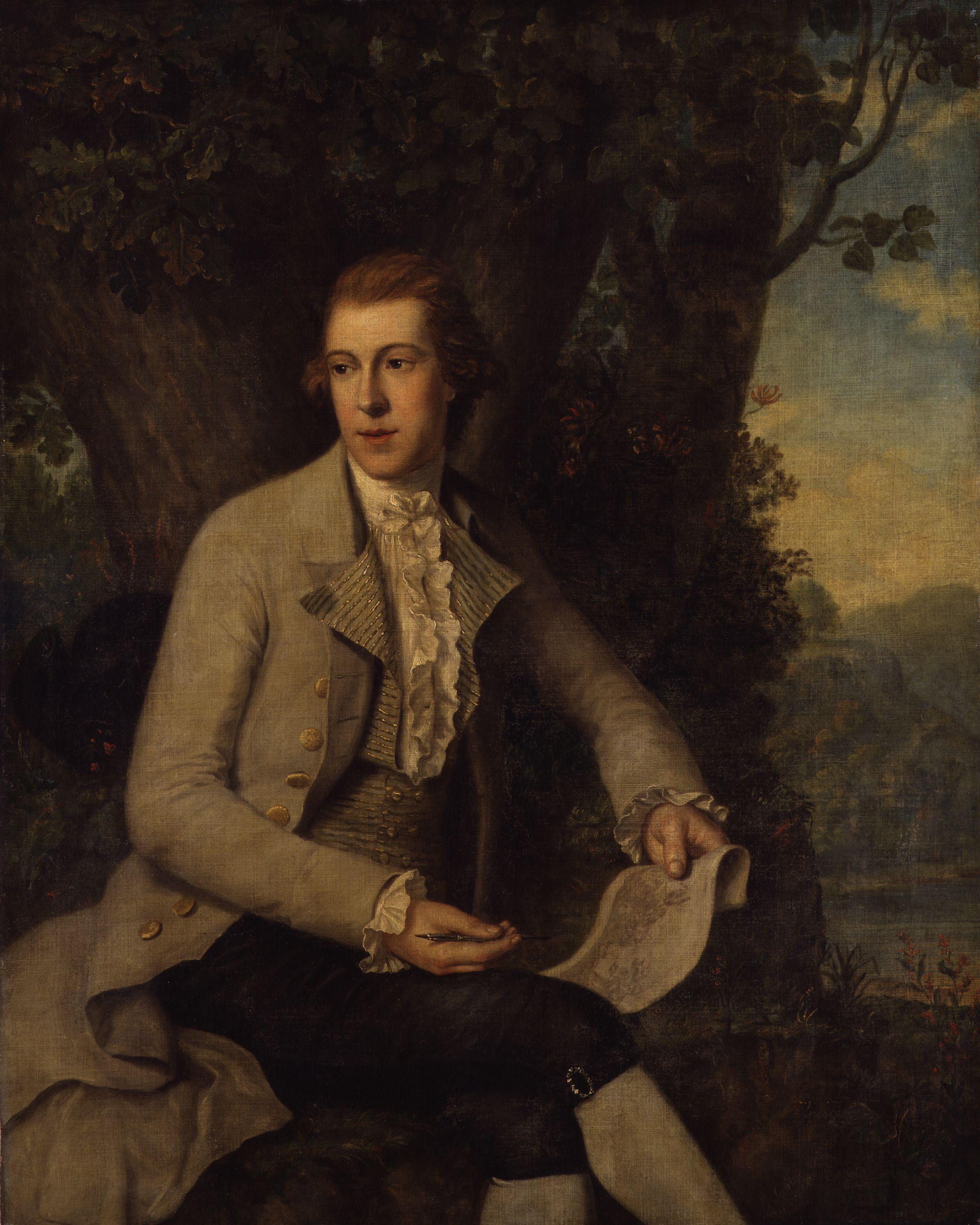
Robert Pollard, 1784 portrait by Richard Samuel

Robert Pollard (1755–1838) was an English engraver and painter.

== Life ==
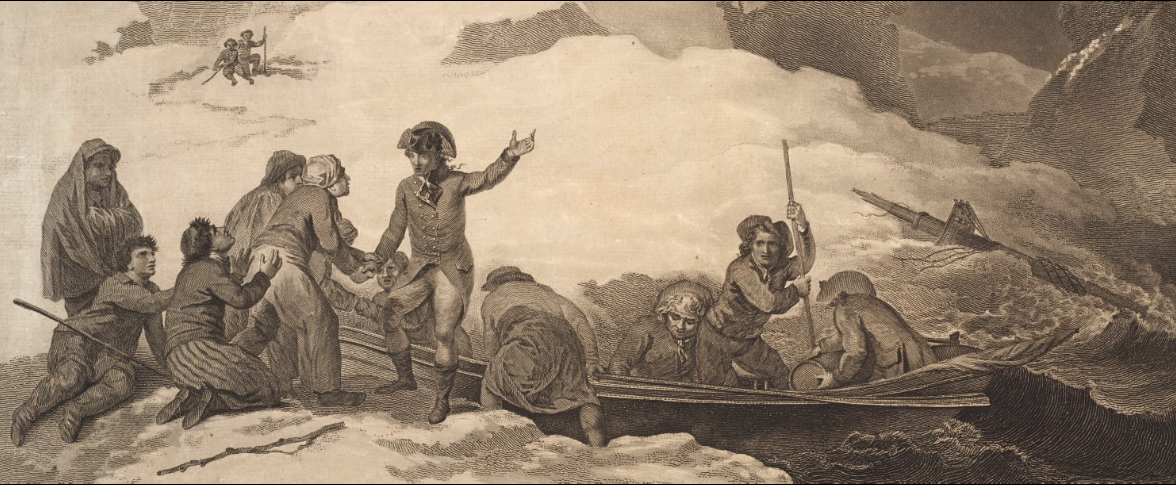
Samuel Waller Prentice, 84th Regiment, 4 January 1780, shipwrecked off Cape Breton, Nova Scotia, by Robert Pollard (1784)

Born at Newcastle-on-Tyne, Pollard was articled to a watch-smith there, and then became a pupil of Richard Wilson. For a time he practised as a landscape and marine painter, producing such works as "The Departure", based on the ship wreck of the 84th Regiment of Foot (1780).

In 1781 he moved to London, worked as an engraver for the printseller John Harris, and established himself in a studio in Spa Fields, London.

In 1788 Pollard was elected a fellow, and in the following year a director, of the Incorporated Society of Artists, which closed down in 1791. He was in business for many years in Islington. In 1810 he sold up, but then in Holloway Place ran a printselling business, for which his son James supplied many of the designs.

In October 1836, as the last surviving member, Pollard gave the charter, books, and papers of the Incorporated Society to the Royal Academy. They had been passed to him in 1808 by Charles Taylor.

The latter part of Pollard's life was spent in poverty and obscurity. He died on 23 May 1838, and was buried at St Mary's, Hornsey.

== Works ==
For a decade in London, Pollard produced a large number of plates, executed in his own mixed style, composed of line engraving, etching, and aquatint. Some were from his own designs: Lieutenant Moody rescuing a Prisoner, 1785, Adventure of Lady Harriet Ackland, 1784, Edwin and Angelina, 1785, The Blind Beggar of Bethnal Green, and eight plates of shipping.

After other artists, Pollard engraved:

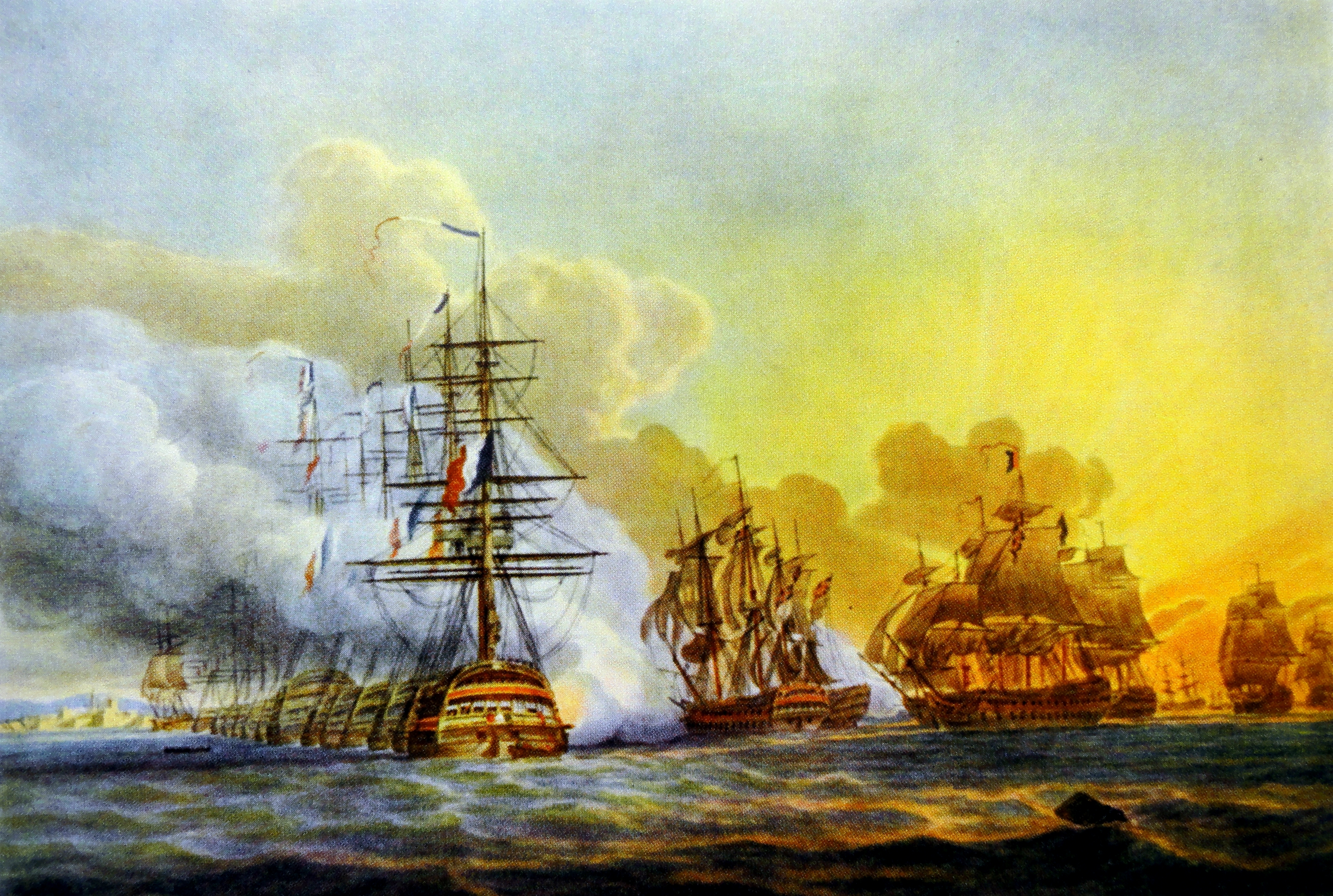
Battle of Abukir (1798) by Robert Pollard

- Wreck of the Grosvenor East Indiaman, 1784;
- Wreck of the Halsewell East Indiaman, 1786;
- Margaret Nicholson's attempt to murder George III, 1786; and
- two plates illustrating the restoration of a young man to life by John Coakley Lettsom and William Hawes, 1787, these all after Robert Smirke;
- Trial of Warren Hastings, 1789;
- Thanksgiving Day in St. Paul's, 1789; and
- Views of Bloomsbury, Hanover, Grosvenor, and Queen squares, London, all after Edward Dayes;
- Wreck of the Centaur and Preservation of Captain Inglefield after the Wreck, a pair after Robert Dodd, 1783;
- Leonora, after John Raphael Smith, 1786.

Pollard engraved many naval scenes after Nicholas Pocock; also works after Richard Cosway, Sawrey Gilpin, Thomas Stothard, Francis Wheatley, and some other artists. Many of these plates were finished in aquatint by Francis Jukes.

== Family ==
Pollard married Ann Iley of Newcastle in 1778. The artist James Pollard was their son.

== Notes ==
Attribution

This article incorporates text from a publication now in the public domain: Lee, Sidney, ed. (1896). "Pollard, Robert". Dictionary of National Biography. Vol. 46. London: Smith, Elder & Co.
