= Portraits in the Characters of the Muses in the Temple of Apollo =

Painting by Richard Samuel

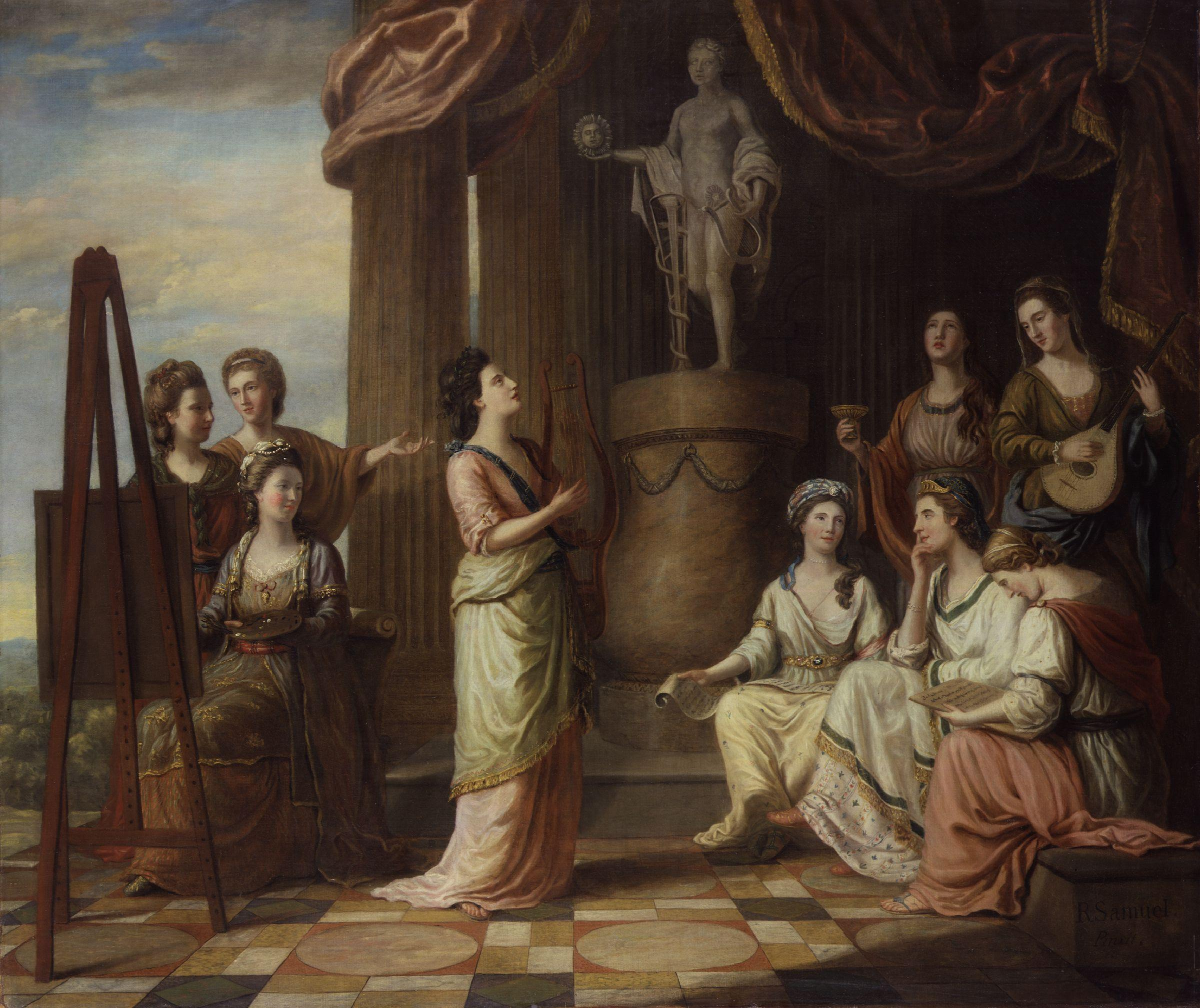
- Artist: Richard Samuel
- Year: 1778
- Type: Oil on canvas, portrait
- Dimensions: 132.1 cm × 154.9 cm (52.0 in × 61.0 in)
- Location: National Portrait Gallery; London

Portraits in the Characters of the Muses in the Temple of Apollo is a 1778 painting by the English artist Richard Samuel. It depicts nine prominent British literary and artistic women as Muses in the Temple of Apollo and is also known as The Nine Living Muses of Great Britain. It was exhibited at the Royal Academy's Summer Exhibition in 1779.

The women depicted were noted intellectuals associated with the Blue Stockings Society. Those portrayed are (left to right, standing) Elizabeth Carter, Anna Laetitia Barbauld, Elizabeth Ann Linley, Hannah More and Charlotte Lennox and (left to right, seated) Angelica Kauffman, Catharine Macaulay, Elizabeth Montagu and Elizabeth Griffith. It is now in the collection of the National Portrait Gallery, having been purchased in 1972.

== Bibliography ==
- Eger, Elizabeth (ed.) Bluestockings Displayed. Cambridge University Press, 2013.
- Nussbaum, Felicity. Rival Queens: Actresses, Performance, and the Eighteenth-Century British Theater. University of Pennsylvania Press, 2011.
