= Francis Jukes =

English engraver and publisher (1745–1812)

Francis Jukes (1745 – 1812) was an English engraver and publisher best known for his topographical and shipping prints, the majority in aquatint. He worked alongside the great illustrators of the late eighteenth century. He contributed numerous plates to various publications of rural scenes. His early prints were published in collaboration with Valentine Green, and later worked in collaboration with the engraver and publisher Robert Pollard.

== Biography ==
Born in Martley, Worcestershire in 1745. He became famous for his, engraving and aquatint work, particularly using a technique he developed with Paul Sandby (1725–1809), a Watercolourist. Sandby and Jukes combined engraving and aquatinting from 1774 onwards. Notable work included Paul Sandby's "A New Drawing Book", published in 1779.

At first, a topographical painter, Jukes developed into an etcher and line engraver and later still learned the aquatint process. He was one of the first British aquatint engravers. It is thought he learnt the method from Sandby; some of his first aquatints are after Sandby's designs.

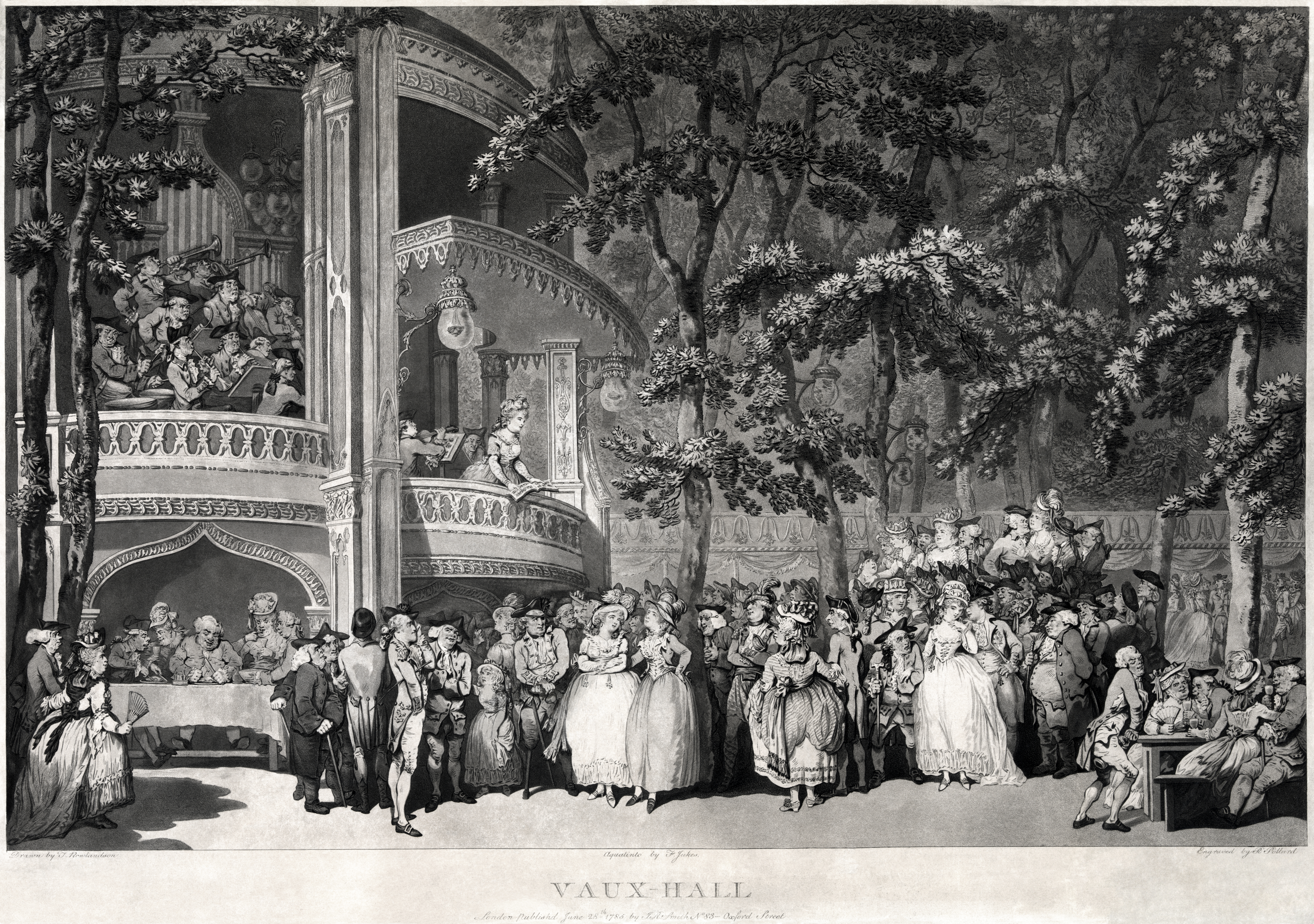
An entertainment in Vauxhall Gardens in c.1785 by Thomas Rowlandson. The two women in the centre are Georgiana, Duchess of Devonshire and her sister Lady Duncannon. The man seated at the table on the left is Samuel Johnson, with James Boswell to his left and Oliver Goldsmith to his right. To the right the actress and author Mary Darby Robinson stands next to the Prince of Wales, later George IV

Jukes was based at 3 Hosier Lane in London, between Holborn and The city, insuring his premises for £50. He lived for 20 years at 10 Howland Street, (off Tottenham Court Road), 1794–1808. Then 57 Upper John Street (now Whitfield Street), Fitzroy Square 1808–1812. He traded alone 1790–1802; later as Jukes and Sargent 1809–1811.

Thereafter he produced a prolific number of engravings and aquatint work, often collaborating with others such as Sawrey Gilpin, William Sawrey Gilpin, Thomas Rowlandson, and James Pollard.

Another collaborator was the animal genre painter and draughtsman Charles Ansell (b. 1752) renowned for his graceful images of horses; his most celebrated work, "Life and Death of a Racehorse", was engraved by Jukes in 1784.

In 1785 he produced a fine engraving of Vauxhall (outer London), drawn by Thomas Rowlandson (1756–1827), engraved by Robert Pollard (1755–1838) and Aquatinto by Jukes himself.

This was followed by more classically derived work with companion pieces "St. Preux and Julia", "Henry and Jessy" drawn by Francis Wheatley all in 1786.

Also in 1786 in collaboration with Pollard, he produced mezzotint illustrations of "A Country Racecourse with horses preparing to start" and "A Country Racecourse with horses running", both after William Mason.

He recorded current events, "The Attempt to Assassinate the King" depicts the attempt made by Margaret Nicholson to kill King George III at the entrance to St. James's Palace on 2 August 1786.

In 1787 Pollard and Jukes engraved "Courtship" and "Matrimony" and a fine set of "London Squares" including a highly collectable "View of Hanover Square", by artist Edward Dayes (1763–1804).

From 1788 he began to develop much wider themes, illustrating "Views in the Pacific", based on sketches from Captain Cook's Third Voyage. He also worked on illustrations of New York. Also in the same year (1788) his engravings of the racehorse "Highflyer", "Foxhound Modish" and "Pointer Dash" after Sawrey Gilpin were produced as part of his continuing work with rural themes.

Published 28 Feb 1789 four prints of Malmesbury Abbey, aquatints by Jukes from drawings by John Hanks (active 1785–1790).

Published in 1789, right; an etching and aquatint by Robert Pollard, by Francis Jukes, after Edward Dayes of "A View of the Tryal of Warren Hastings Esqr. before the Court of Peers

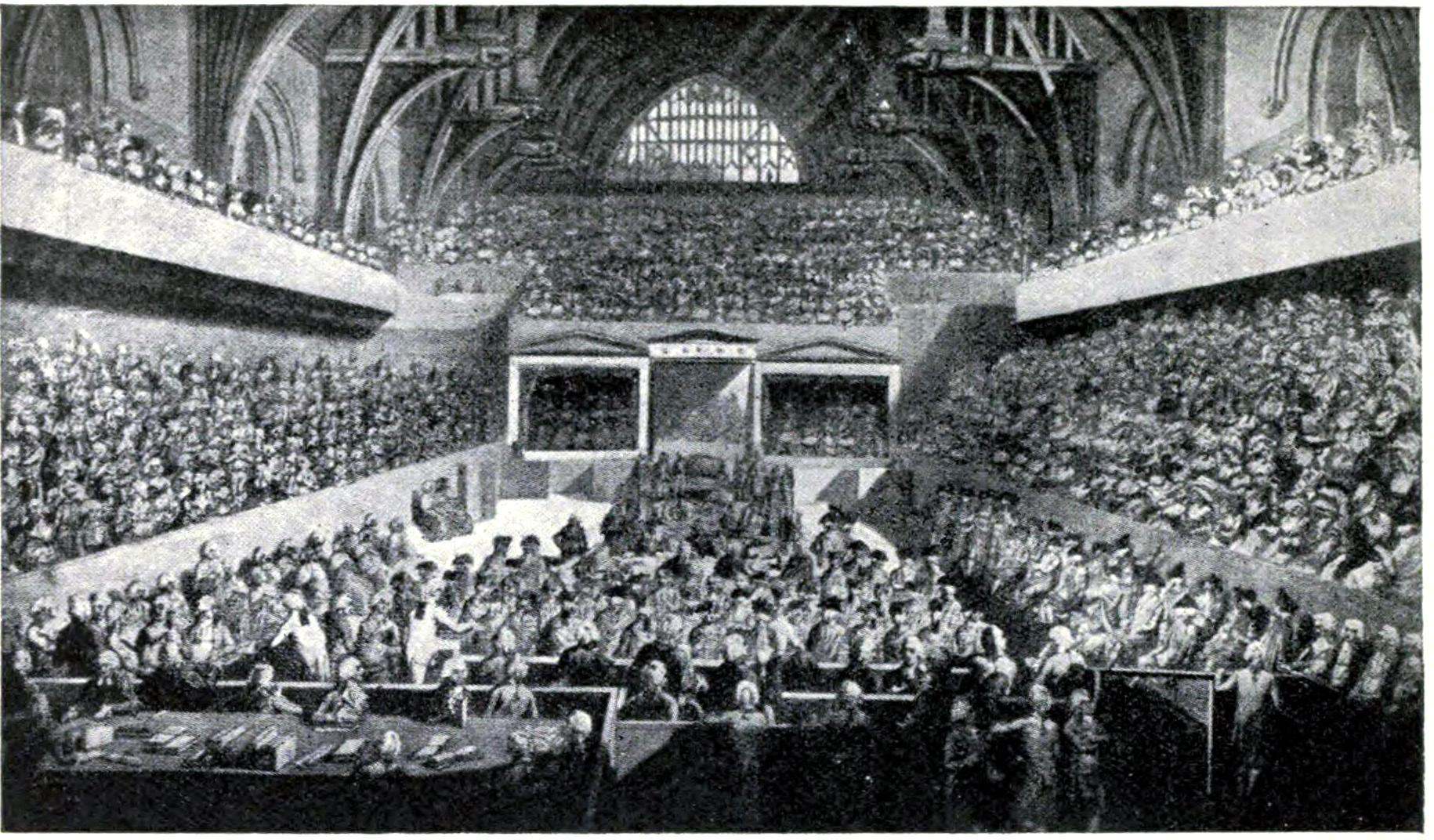
'A View of the Tryal of Warren Hastings Esqr. before the Court of Peers', 1788

In 1790 he produced a series (eight plates) of horses at full gallop called "The Pytchley Hunt"; after the artist and horseman Charles Loraine Smith. It was originally intended to be a set of six plates.

During 1792–1794 "Walmsley's Views in North Wales", were completed. The artist Thomas Walmsley (1763–1805). Items included views of Llangollen Bridge; and Overton Bridge, right.

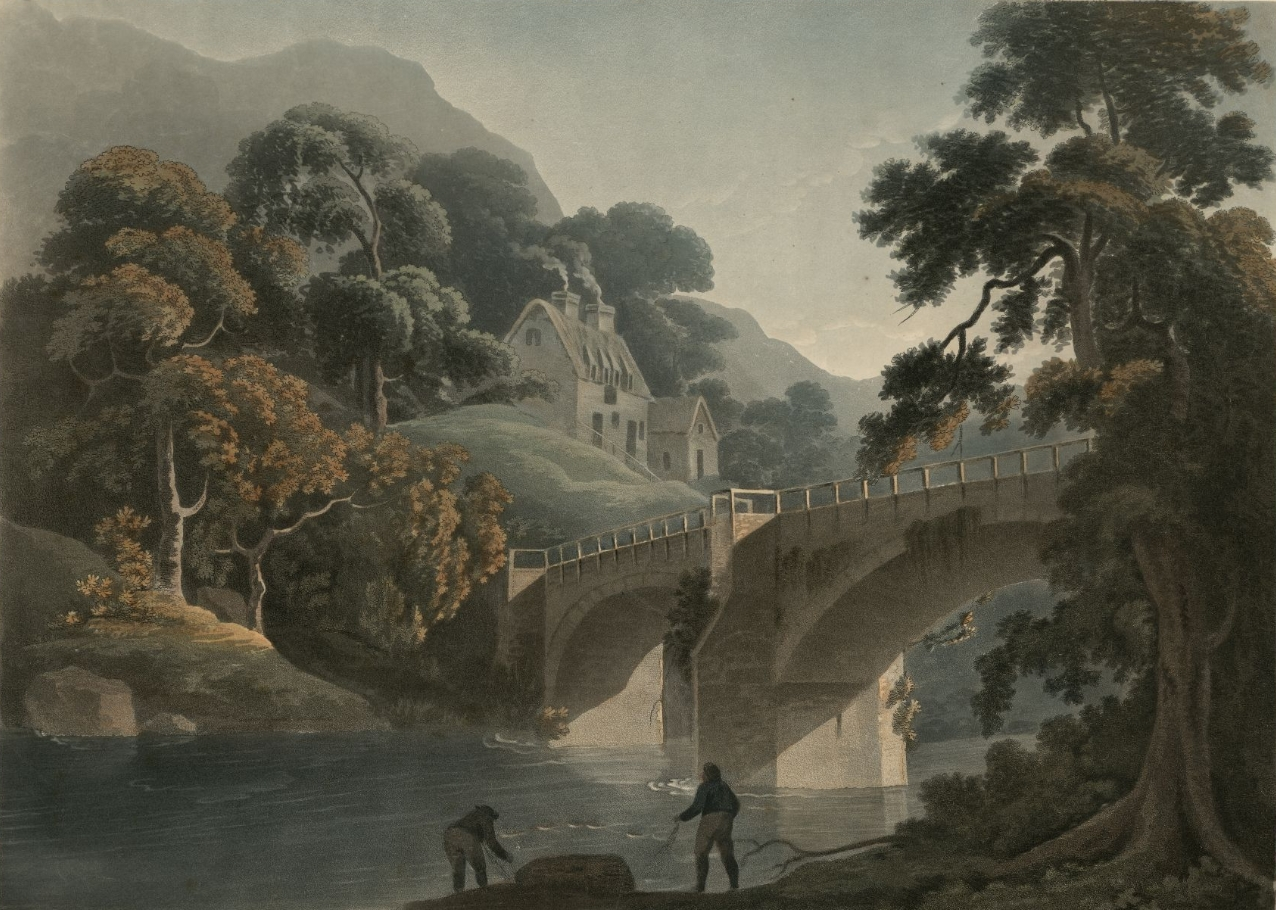
View of Overton Bridge, 1794

In 1795 he issued a set of four coloured mezzotints chronicling "The demise of the Ramillies" in 1782 as portrayed by Robert Dodd (artist). Engraved and published by Jukes from his shop at No.10 Howland Street.

1796 saw two nostalgic engravings, "A Visit to the Uncle" and " A Visit to the Aunt" painted by Thomas Rowlandson in 1786. In the same year he aquatinted and published a view of the Serpentine River, Hyde Park, etched by Jacob Schnebbelie in 1787.

He was also concurrently illustrating more of Edward Dayes work, a collection of "Views on The Wye" in 1797.

"Views of Ireland" (1800–1). A "View of Brielle" (in Holland).

Around 1800 he engraved an illustration of Mount Vernon in Virginia, home of George Washington. This work drawn in 1800 by a Scottish born American artist Alexander Robertson (1772–1841).

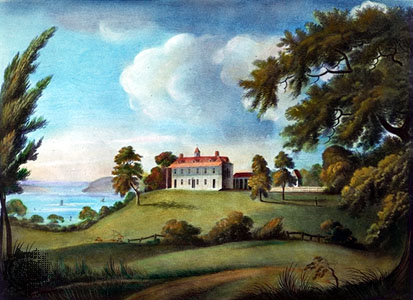
Mount Vernon, after Alexander Robertson, aquatint by Francis Jukes, circa 1800

At the turn of the century Francis Jukes was fully engaged with rural themes, including Francis Nicholson's "Views of England", These Nicholson works appeared in "The Beauties of England and Wales", Author: Britton, John & Edward Wedlake Brayley – A book published in 18 volumes from 1801 to 1815.

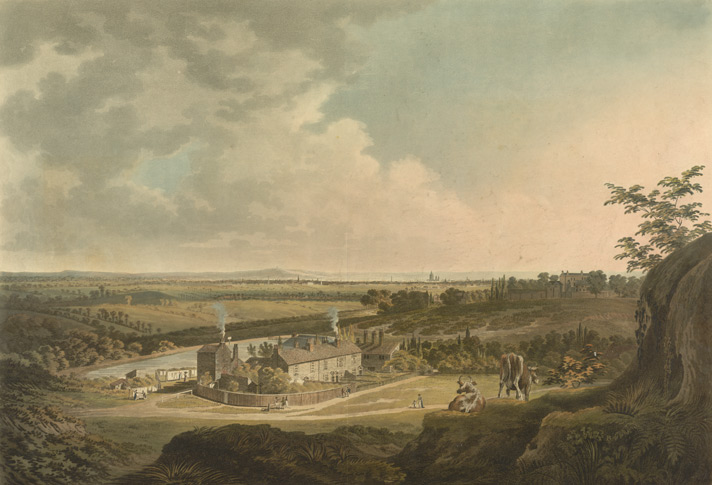
A View on Hampstead Heath, looking towards London, painted by Francis James Sarjent, engraved by Jukes, 1804

In 1802 he was working on A. Campbell's "A Journey from Edinburgh to Parts of North Britain" aka "A Journey to Scotland".

The same year he produced a pair of high quality engravings of "A Two Year Old Ram" and "A Two Year Old Ewe" of the New Leicestershire Breed".

In 1804 he issued an aquatint engraving of "A View on Hampstead Heath, looking towards London"; after the Landscape artist Francis James Sarjent who gave as his address as '10, Howland Street'. Sarjent had exhibited two works at the Royal Academy, their titles were 'View of the city of London from the fields below Hampstead' in 1802 and 'A View of Woolwich, looking down the river' in 1803.

Francis Jukes died in 1812 at Upper John Street, London. It's been speculated that the illness towards the end of his life may have been caused by acid fumes used in the aquatinting process. His work is highly collectable.
