= Elizabeth Carter =

English poet and polymath (1717–1806)

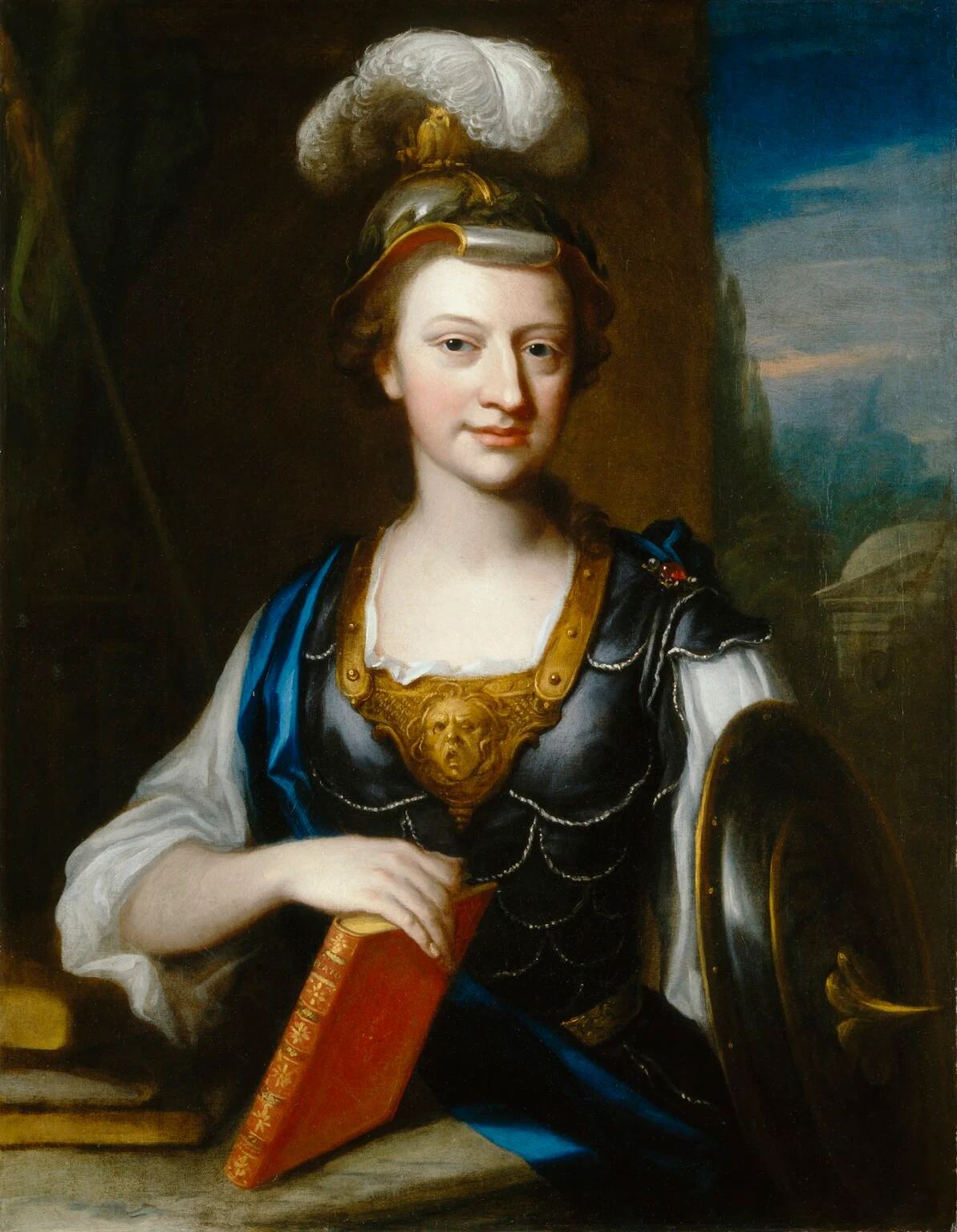
- Elizabeth Carter as Minerva, goddess of wisdom, by John Fayram (painted between 1735 and 1741), NPG
- Born: 16 December 1717; Deal, Kent, England
- Died: 19 February 1806 (aged 88); London, England
- Occupations: Poet, classicist, writer, translator
- Writing career
- Pen name: Eliza
- Language: English
- Notable works: All the Works of Epictetus, Which are Now Extant
- Literary movement: Bluestocking Circle

Elizabeth Carter (pen name Eliza; 16 December 1717 – 19 February 1806) was an English poet, classicist, writer, translator, and linguist. As one of the Bluestocking Circle that surrounded Elizabeth Montagu, she earned respect for the first English translation of the 2nd-century Discourses of Epictetus. She also published poems and translated from French and Italian, and corresponded profusely. Among her many eminent friends were Elizabeth Montagu, Hannah More, Hester Chapone and other Bluestocking members. Also close friends were Anne Hunter, a poet and socialite, and Mary Delany. She befriended Samuel Johnson, editing some editions of his periodical The Rambler.

== Early life and education ==
Born in Deal, Kent, on 16 December 1717, Elizabeth Carter was the eldest child of Rev. Nicolas Carter, perpetual curate of Deal, and his first wife, Margaret (died c. 1728), who was the only daughter and heir of John Swayne of Bere Regis, Dorset. She died when Elizabeth was ten. Her redbrick family home still stands at the junction of South Street and Middle Street, close to the seafront.

Nicolas Carter himself undertook the labour of educating his numerous children in the Latin and Greek languages. His eldest daughter was so slow to understand her lessons that he almost despaired of ever making her a scholar, and would have given up but for her resolute perseverance as a child, in which she struggled incessantly against all obstacles. From an early age, her ambition was to be good and learned, and she steadfastly pursued that goal through life. She could never acquire grammar as a rudimentary theory, but having attained great proficiency in the Greek and Latin languages – being especially proficient in Greek – she deduced the principles from the literature. Her father also taught her Hebrew. To assist her in acquiring French, her father sent her to board for a year with the family of M. Le Seur, a refugee minister in Canterbury, where she learnt to understand it and speak it fluently. She later applied herself to Italian, Spanish, German and Portuguese, and very late in life, learnt enough Arabic to read it without a dictionary.

Being naturally heavy, and resolved to stay awake as long as possible in pursuit of her studies, she had recourse to use snuff, and never broke herself of the habit. Over-application to her studies and lack of sleep brought on intense headaches, to which she remained subject through life. Her taste for literature came from the finest models available, and her refined manner and habits from an early introduction to high society.

She carefully studied astronomy and the geography of ancient history. She learnt to play the spinnet and the German flute and was fond of dancing in her youth. She drew tolerably well, was acquainted with household economy, loved gardening and growing flowers, and occupied her leisure or social hours with needlework. In the hope of counteracting the bad effects of too much study, she habitually took long walks and attended social parties.

=== Friendships ===
Elizabeth Robinson, born in 1720, was the eldest daughter of Matthew Robinson, 2nd Baron Rokeby, who had married the heiress of the Drakes of Horton, near Hythe. She spent much of her childhood there and was early attracted by sympathy of feeling and similarity of pursuits to a contemporary neighbour, Elizabeth Carter. A close friendship formed, which lasted to the end of their long lives. In 1742, Robinson married Edward Montagu, grandson of the second Earl Of Sandwich; subsequently Carter often visited her at her country seat at Sandleford and her house in London.

In 1741 she became acquainted with Catherine Talbot and developed a close friendship, as they appreciated each other's faculties, virtues and piety. Through Talbot and her mother, she made contact with Thomas Secker, with whom they resided. He was then Bishop of Oxford and became Archbishop of Canterbury in 1758.

== Career ==
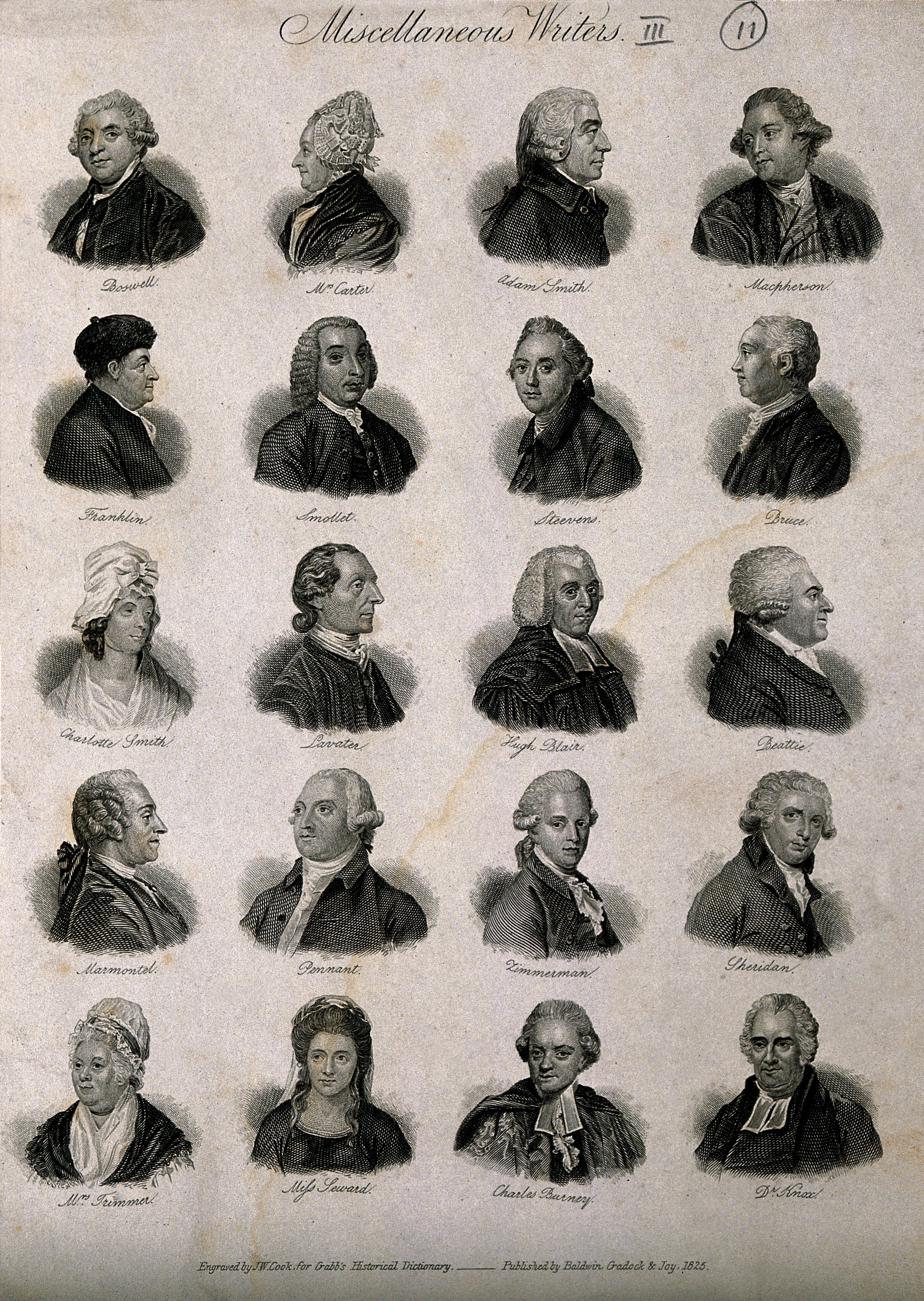
Writers; twenty portraits. Engraving by J.W. Cook, 1825. (Carter is in the first row, second from the left.)

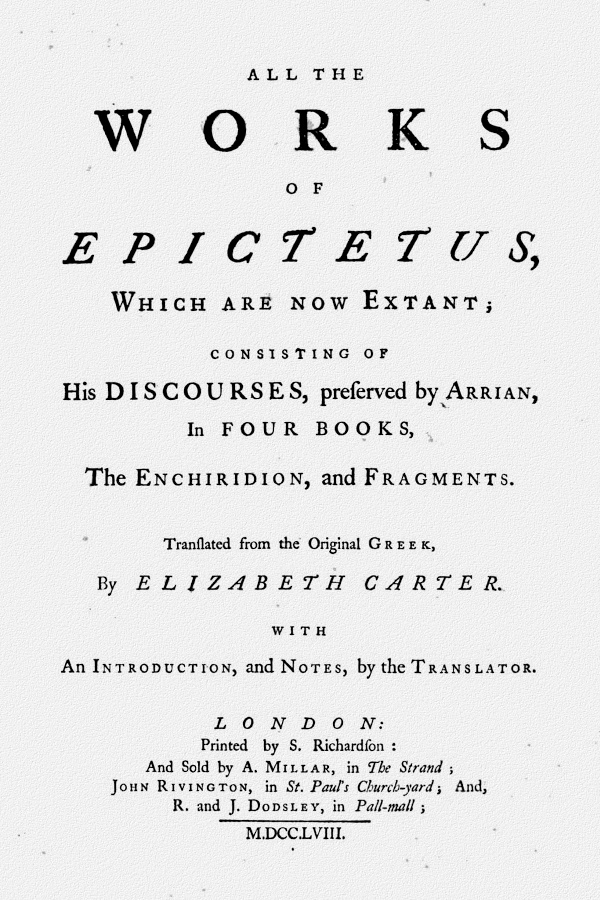
Title page of the Works of Epictetus, translated by Carter. First edition, 1758

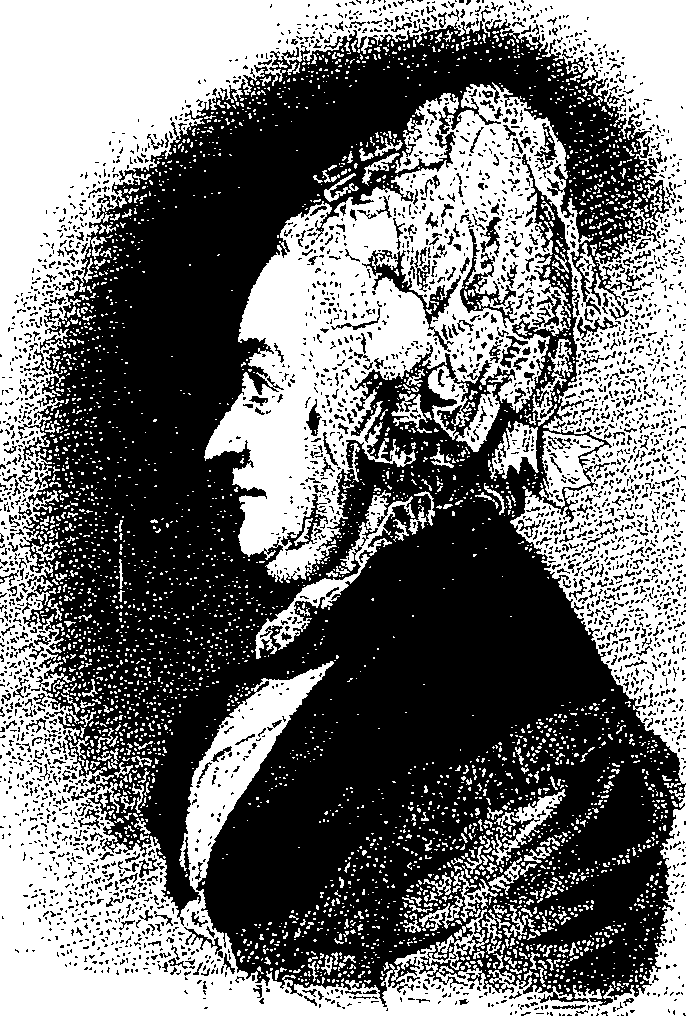
Elizabeth Carter, Poems on several occasions. The fourth edition. (1777)

Carter's earliest attempts at literary composition were in verse. Her father was friendly with Edward Cave, a publisher, in whose fourth volume of The Gentleman's Magazine she published several pieces under the pseudonym Eliza, when she was only 16 years old. Visiting London occasionally with her father, she was introduced by Cave to many literary persons, among them Dr Johnson, soon after his first settlement there in the year 1737. In 1738, she published an anonymous collection of her poems, including those previously printed in The Gentleman's Magazine. In the same year, her father had conversations with Carter about marriage, and again a few years later, but she remained single, wishing to stay independent. She adopted the matronly designation "Mrs." after the manner of an earlier generation. Carter rendered into English De Crousaz's Examen de l'essai de Monsieur Pope sur l'homme (Examination of Mr Pope's "An Essay on Man", two volumes, 1739) and Algarotti's Newtonianismo per le dame (Newtonianism for women).

Early in the year 1749, she began translating All the Works of Epictetus, Which are Now Extant, submitting it sheet by sheet for Secker's revising. She finished the Discourses in December 1752, but at his suggestion added the Enchiridion and Fragments, with an introduction and notes. Subscriptions obtained by him and from her other wealthy and influential friends allowed the work to be published in 1758. Her position in the pantheon of 18th-century women writers was ensured by her translation of Epictetus, the first English translation of the known works by the Greek Stoic philosopher, which brought her a clear profit of £1,000. The translation passed through three editions and retained a high reputation in standard literature. While occupied with bringing the first edition for the press, she was also preparing her youngest brother for the University of Cambridge.

Carter befriended Samuel Johnson, editing some issues of The Rambler in the 1750s. He wrote, "My old friend Mrs. Carter could make a pudding as well as translate Epictetus from the Greek...."

=== Style and themes ===
Carter's sound and comprehensive mind, cultured as it was, could produce nothing bad, but it lacked the qualifications of the true poet: active originality, power of conception, and of shaping of new concepts. Her poems demonstrated regularity of numbers and a well-graduated succession of thoughts.

Carter's biographer published a broad selection of her thirty-year correspondence with Talbot, and her correspondence with Mrs Agmondesham Vesey in the period 1763–1787 in two quarto volumes. Carter's letters were noted for correct, perspicuous and appropriate language, soundness of judgment, moderation of spirit, deep sincerity and pervading piety. Her cheerfulness was clear from her sentiments and opinions and in occasional expressions of buoyant gaiety, in which there was always something awkward, forced, and exaggerated.

Carter kept an interest in religious matters. She was influenced by Hester Chapone and wrote apologia of the Christian faith, asserting the authority of the Bible over human matters. One such, Objections against the New Testament with Mrs Carter's Answers to them, appeared in the compilation of Memoirs of the Life of Mrs Elizabeth Carter by Montagu Pennington, which included her Notes on the Bible and the Answers to Objections concerning the Christian Religion. Her deep belief in God also appears in her poems "In Diem Natalem" and "Thoughts at Midnight" (also known as "A Night Piece").

At the suggestion of William Pulteney, 1st Earl of Bath, who took delight in her conversation and writings, Carter published another volume of poems in 1762, to which George Lyttelton, 1st Baron Lyttelton contributed a poetical introduction.

In August 1768, her friend Archbishop Secker died, as did her friend Miss Sutton in November 1769 and her best friend Catherine Talbot in 1770. In the same year, Carter edited and published a volume of Talbot's papers entitled Reflections on the Seven Days of the Week, and subsequently two volumes of her Essays and Poems.

=== Nine Living Muses ===
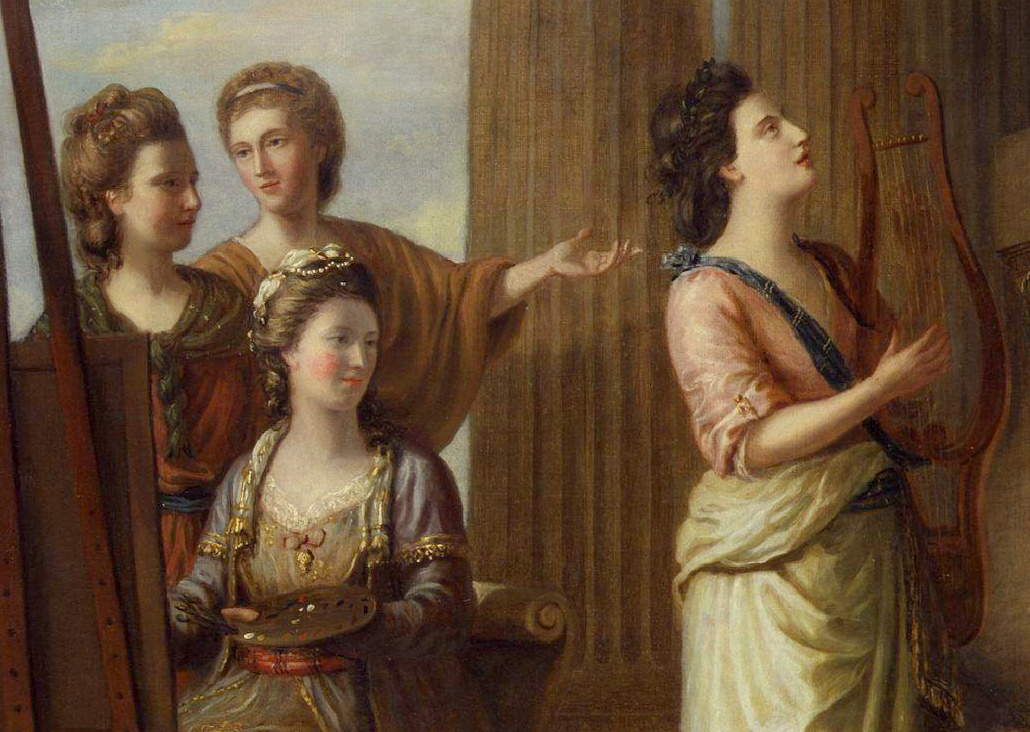
Elizabeth Carter (far left), in the company of other "Bluestockings" in Richard Samuel's The Nine Living Muses of Great Britain, 1779. National Portrait Gallery, London. (cropped)

Carter appeared in the engraved (1777) and painted (1778) versions of Richard Samuel's The Nine Living Muses of Great Britain (1779), but the figures were so idealised that she complained she could not identify herself or anyone else in the work. Samuel had not done any sittings from life when preparing for it. Fanny Burney is quoted in Boswell's Life of Samuel Johnson as saying in 1780 she thought Carter "a really noble-looking woman; I never saw age so graceful in the female sex yet; her whole face seems to beam with goodness, piety, and philanthropy." However, Betsy Sheridan, sister of the playwright, described her five years later in her diary as "rather fat and not very striking in appearance".

=== Reception ===
Carter's difficulties were all confined to her books of private study; she met with no discouragements from the outer world. Her translations were approved and her verses applauded by Burke, Dr Johnson, Savage, and Baratier, and she found herself courted by many members of learned society. In 1782, at the desire of a friend, Sir W. J. Pulteney, she accompanied his daughter to Paris, but returned home in 16 days and confined her later journeys to British soil. She was repeatedly honoured at Deal with visits from various members of the royal family. The Queen, long accustomed to ask her opinion upon books via ladies of the court, in 1791 commanded her attendance at Cremorne House, where as translator of Epictetus she was formally presented and received with the highest favour.

== Personal life and other activities ==
In 1763, Carter accompanied the Earl of Bath and Edward and Elizabeth Montagu on a continental tour. They crossed the Channel to Calais, visited the Spa, passed down the Rhine, and, travelling through Brussels, Ghent, Bruges, and Dunkirk to Calais, re-crossed to Dover, after an absence of nearly four months. In the summer of 1764, Lord Bath died; and as he made no mention of Elizabeth Carter in his will, the ultimate heir to his property, Sir William Johnson Pulteney, spontaneously settled upon her an annuity of £100, which he soon afterwards increased to £150.

Her father having lost his second wife, and his other children being settled in homes of their own, Carter bought a house at Deal in 1762. Her father rented part of it, while she managed the household. They had their separate libraries and spent their study hours apart, meeting at meals and spending evenings together during periods of six months. The other half of the year she usually passed in London, or visiting friends at their country houses.

After her father's death in 1774, a small inheritance fell to her. In 1775, Edward Montagu died and his wife Elizabeth inherited a large property. Among her first acts was to bequeath an annuity of £100 to Carter. Mrs Underwood, a family connection of the Carters, afterwards bequeathed to Carter an annuity of £40, and Mrs Talbot dying in 1783, left her a legacy of £200. Thus her literary fame eventually acquired her an unexpectedly secure income for her wants and needs.

Carter belonged to the Society for Effecting the Abolition of the Slave Trade, also known as the Abolition Society or Anti-Slavery Society.

== Later years and death ==
In 1796, Carter had a dangerous illness, from which she never thoroughly recovered. She continued, however, to exert herself in visiting the poor and in establishing and maintaining charitable institutions. In 1800, her faithful friend Mrs Montagu died at the age of 80. Their correspondence of 1755–1799 was published after Mrs Carter's death by her nephew, Mr Pennington.

Like her bluestocking contemporaries, Carter lived a long life. Increasing deafness reduced her conversational abilities. On 19 February 1806, after a long period of increasing weakness, Carter died at her lodgings in Clarges Street, London.

== Influence and legacy ==
The novelist Samuel Richardson included Carter's poem "Ode to Wisdom" in the text of his novel Clarissa (1747–1848), but without ascribing it to her. It was later published in a corrected form in the Gentleman's Magazine and Carter received an apology from Richardson.

Elizabeth Gaskell, the 19th-century novelist, refers to Carter as an epistolatory model, bracketing her in Cranford with Hester Chapone, a self-taught Bluestocking. Virginia Woolf saw her as a feminist precursor – urging "homage to the robust shade of Eliza Carter – the valiant old woman who tied a bell to her bedstead in order that she might wake early and learn Greek."
