= Elizabeth Montagu =

English social reformer and arts patron (1718–1800)

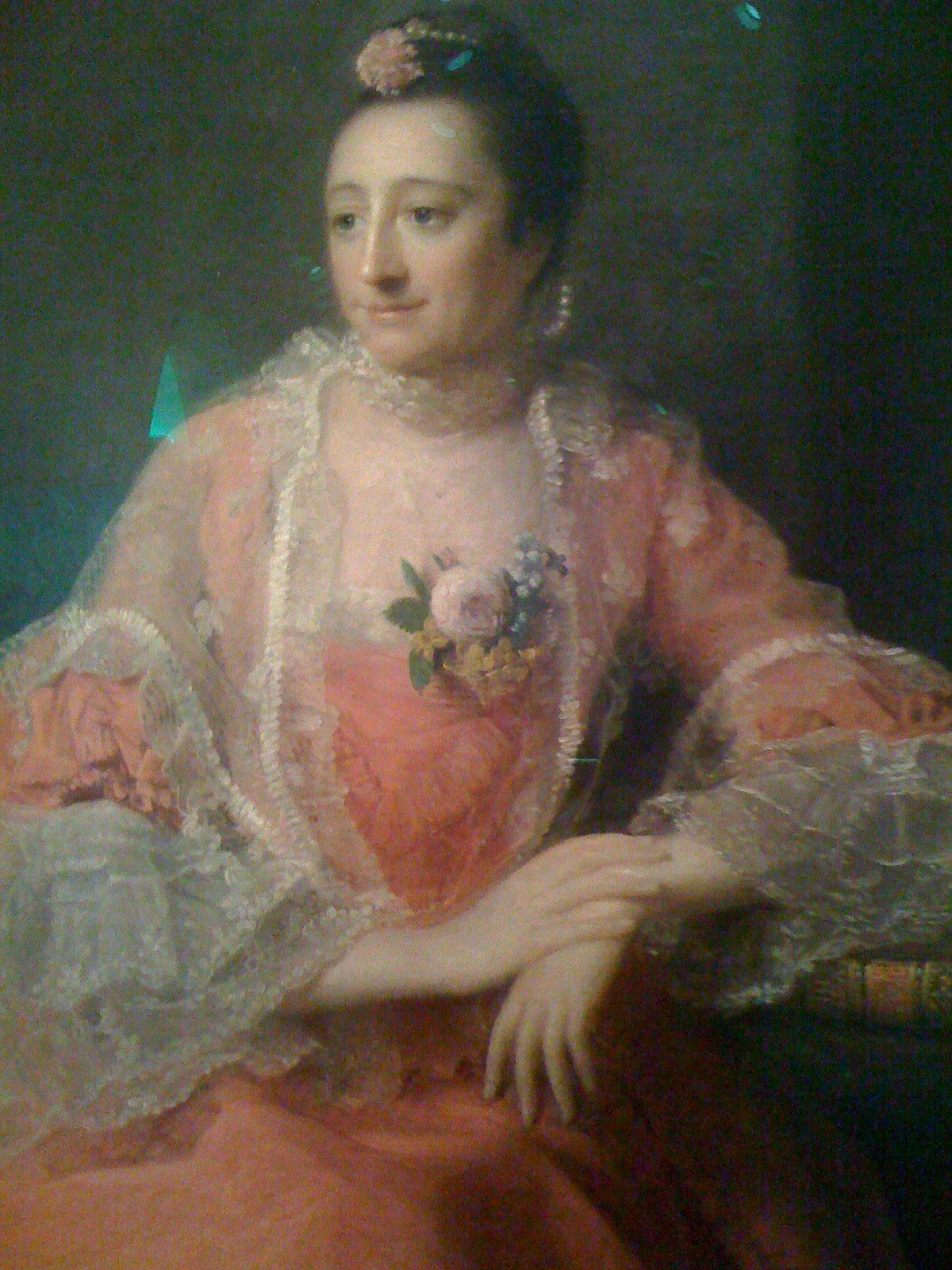
- Elizabeth Montagu by Allan Ramsay, 1762
- Born: 2 October 1718; Treasurer’s House, York, Yorkshire, England
- Died: 25 August 1800 (aged 81)
- Occupations: Social reformer, patron of the arts, salonnière, literary critic and writer
- Movement: Blue Stockings Society
- Spouse: Edward Montagu (m. 1742, d. 1776)
- Relatives: Sarah Scott (sister)

Elizabeth Montagu (née Robinson; 2 October 1718 – 25 August 1800) was a British social reformer, patron of the arts, salonnière, literary critic and writer, who helped to organize and lead the Blue Stockings Society. Her parents were both from wealthy families with strong ties to the British peerage and learned life. She was sister to Sarah Scott, author of A Description of Millenium [sic] Hall and the Country Adjacent. She married Edward Montagu, a man with extensive landholdings, to become one of the richer women of her era. She devoted this fortune to fostering English and Scottish literature and to the relief of the poor.

== Early life ==
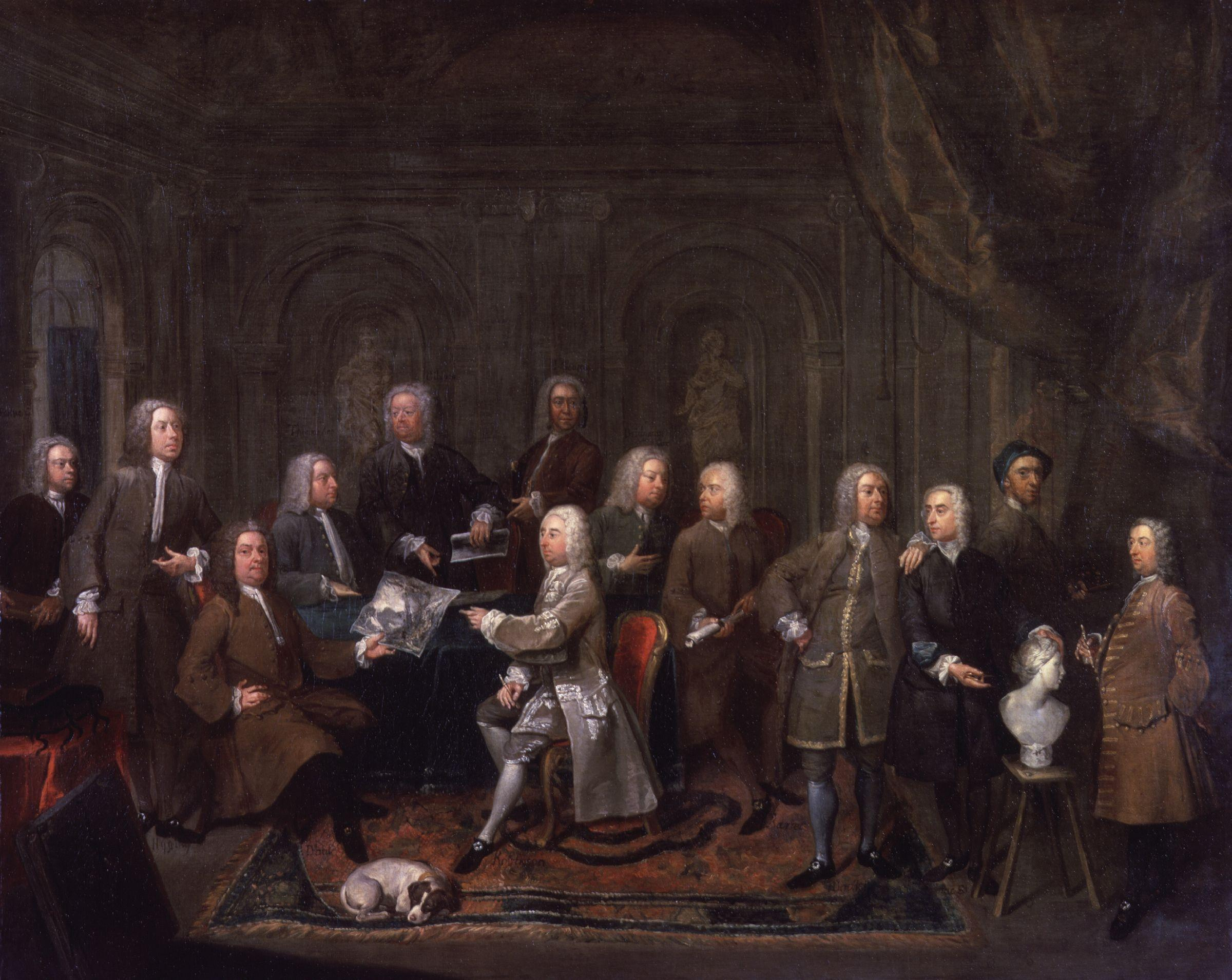
Mrs Montagu's father, Robinson, is in the centre of this group portrait of Virtuosis by Gawen Hamilton

She was born in Treasurer’s House, York, Yorkshire, to Matthew Robinson (1694–1778) of West Layton and Edgeley in Yorkshire, and Elizabeth daughter of Robert Drake of Cambridge, by his wife Sarah Morris, daughter of Thomas Morris of Mount Morris, Monks Horton. Elizabeth was the eldest of their three daughters. Conyers Middleton, the prominent Cambridge don, was the second husband of her Drake grandmother Sarah Morris. She was baptised in the church of Holy Trinity, Goodramgate.

Between 1720 and 1736 the family owned part of what is now a National Trust property: Treasurer's House, in York. Elizabeth and her sister Sarah, the future novelist Sarah Scott, spent time as children on extended stays with Dr Middleton, as both parents were somewhat aloof. The two girls learned Latin, French, and Italian and studied literature. As a child, Elizabeth and Sarah, in particular, were very close, but grew apart after Sarah became sick with smallpox.

While young, Elizabeth became a friend of Lady Margaret Harley, later the Duchess of Portland, the only surviving child of Edward Harley, 2nd Earl of Oxford and Earl Mortimer. Lady Margaret and Elizabeth corresponded weekly when apart and were inseparable when together. She spent time with Lady Margaret in London and met many of the celebrated figures of the 1730s, including the poet Edward Young and the religious thinker Gilbert West. In Lady Margaret's household, men and women spoke as equals and engaged in witty, learned banter. Mrs Montagu later used this model of intellectual discourse in her salons. Visits to Lady Margaret became more important to Elizabeth when her mother inherited a country seat in Kent and made that her home, with her daughters.

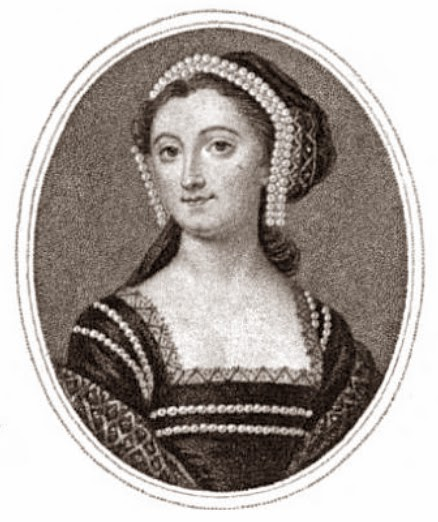
Elizabeth Montagu, as Anne Boleyn, black and white reproduction of a miniature by Christian Friedrich Zincke, in a friendship box, c. 1740

== Marriage to Montagu ==
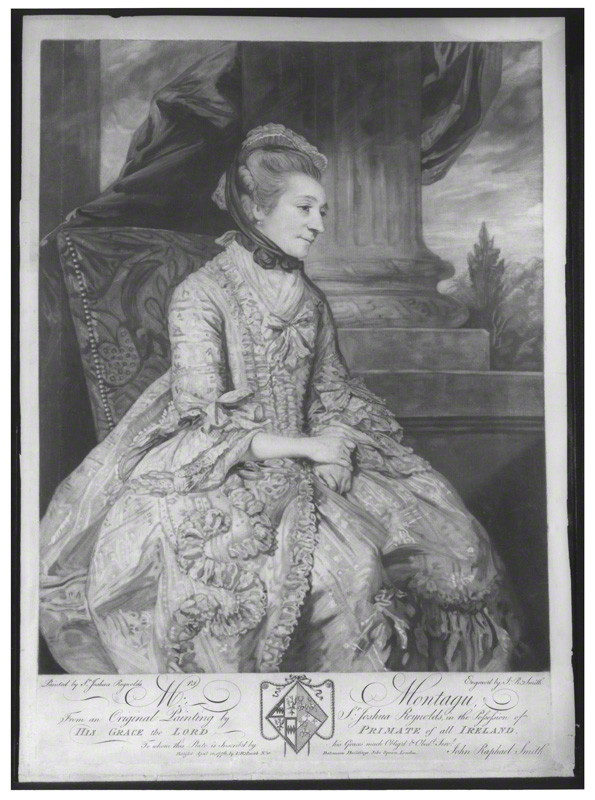
Elizabeth Montagu, mezzotint engraving, by John Raphael Smith after a portrait by Sir Joshua Reynolds, published 10 April 1776, 20 x 14 inches. In 1776 the Reynolds original was in possession of her cousin, the Lord Primate of Ireland, Richard Robinson, 1st Baron Rokeby. Now recorded as part of National Trust collection, item NT 592596, mezzotint, Treasurer's House, York, but not on show

In 1738, Montagu wrote to Harley explaining that she had no desire for men or marriage. She saw marriage as a rational and expedient convention and did not suppose it possible to love a man. In 1742 she married Edward Montagu, grandson of the Edward Montagu, 1st Earl of Sandwich, who owned numerous coal mines and had several rents and estates in Northumberland. She was 24 and he was 50 years old. The marriage was advantageous, but apparently not very passionate. All the same, she bore a son, John, the next year, and she loved her child immensely. When the child died unexpectedly in 1744, she was devastated. She and Edward remained friendly throughout their remaining time together, but there were no more children or pregnancies. Prior to the loss of her son, she had not been very religious, but his death brought her to take religion increasingly seriously. Meanwhile, her sister, Sarah Scott, was also growing increasingly devout.

Elizabeth was accompanied most of the time by a lady's companion, in a role derived from that of a royal lady in waiting. A companion would be expected to carry things and aid Elizabeth on her daily round. Barbara Schnorrenberg suggests that Sarah Scott took this function and adds that there is good reason to suggest that Scott married poorly to escape it (Schnorrenberg 723). After Elizabeth's mother died, her father moved to London with his housekeeper or possibly mistress, giving no money at all to his children. When Sarah was removed from her bad marriage, Elizabeth's father (whose ward she was) not only gave her no financial help, but forbade either Elizabeth or Matthew, her brother, from relieving her distress.

Beginning in 1750, she and Edward established a routine, where they would winter in London in Mayfair and then in the spring go to Sandleford in Berkshire, which had been his since 1730. He would then go on to Northumberland and Yorkshire to manage his holdings, while she would occasionally accompany him to the family manor house at East Denton Hall, a mansion dating from 1622 on the West Road in Newcastle upon Tyne.

She was a shrewd businesswoman, despite affecting to patronise Northumbrian society for its practical conversation. Though acting as Lady Bountiful to miners and their families, she was pleased at how cheap this could be. She was also glad to note that "our pitmen are afraid of being turned off and that fear keeps an order and regularity amongst them that is very uncommon." Elizabeth enjoyed hearing the miners singing in the pit, but found, alas, that their dialect (Geordie) was "dreadful to the auditors' nerves." Horace Walpole wrote to George Montagu in 1768: "Our best sun is Newcastle coal."

== Salon and cultural life ==
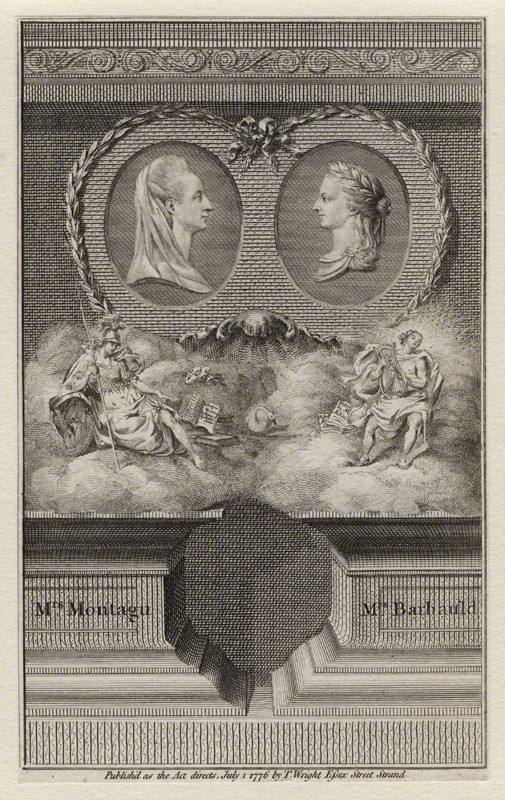
Elizabeth Montagu & Anna Laetitia Barbauld, engraving after Thomas Holloway, published by T. Wright, Essex Street, Strand, 1 July 1776, 6.25 by 4 inches

In London during the 1750s, Elizabeth began to be a celebrated hostess. She organized literary breakfasts with Gilbert West, George Lyttelton and others. By 1760, these had turned into populous evening entertainments. Card playing and strong drink were forbidden from these convocations, which came to be now known as Blue Stocking events.

By 1770, Montagu's home on Hill Street had become the premier salon in London. Samuel Johnson, Sir Joshua Reynolds, Edmund Burke, David Garrick, and Horace Walpole were all in the circle. For writers, being introduced there meant patronage, and Montagu patronized a number of authors, including Elizabeth Carter, Hannah More, Frances Burney, Anna Barbauld, Sarah Fielding, Hester Chapone, James Beattie, James Woodhouse and Anna Williams. Samuel Johnson's hostess, Hester Thrale, was also an occasional visitor to Hill Street. Among her persistent admirers was the physician Messenger Monsey. Among the Blue Stockings, Elizabeth Montagu was not the dominant personality, but she was the woman of greatest means, and it was her house, purse and power that made the society possible. As a literary critic, she was a fan of Samuel Richardson, both Fieldings (Henry Fielding and Sarah Fielding), and Fanny Burney, and she was pleased to discover that Laurence Sterne was a distant relation through the Botham family. He entrusted her with the disposition of his papers on his departure for France, as he was in ill health and the prospect of his dying abroad was real. She was a supporter of Bishop Percy's Reliques of Ancient English Poetry.

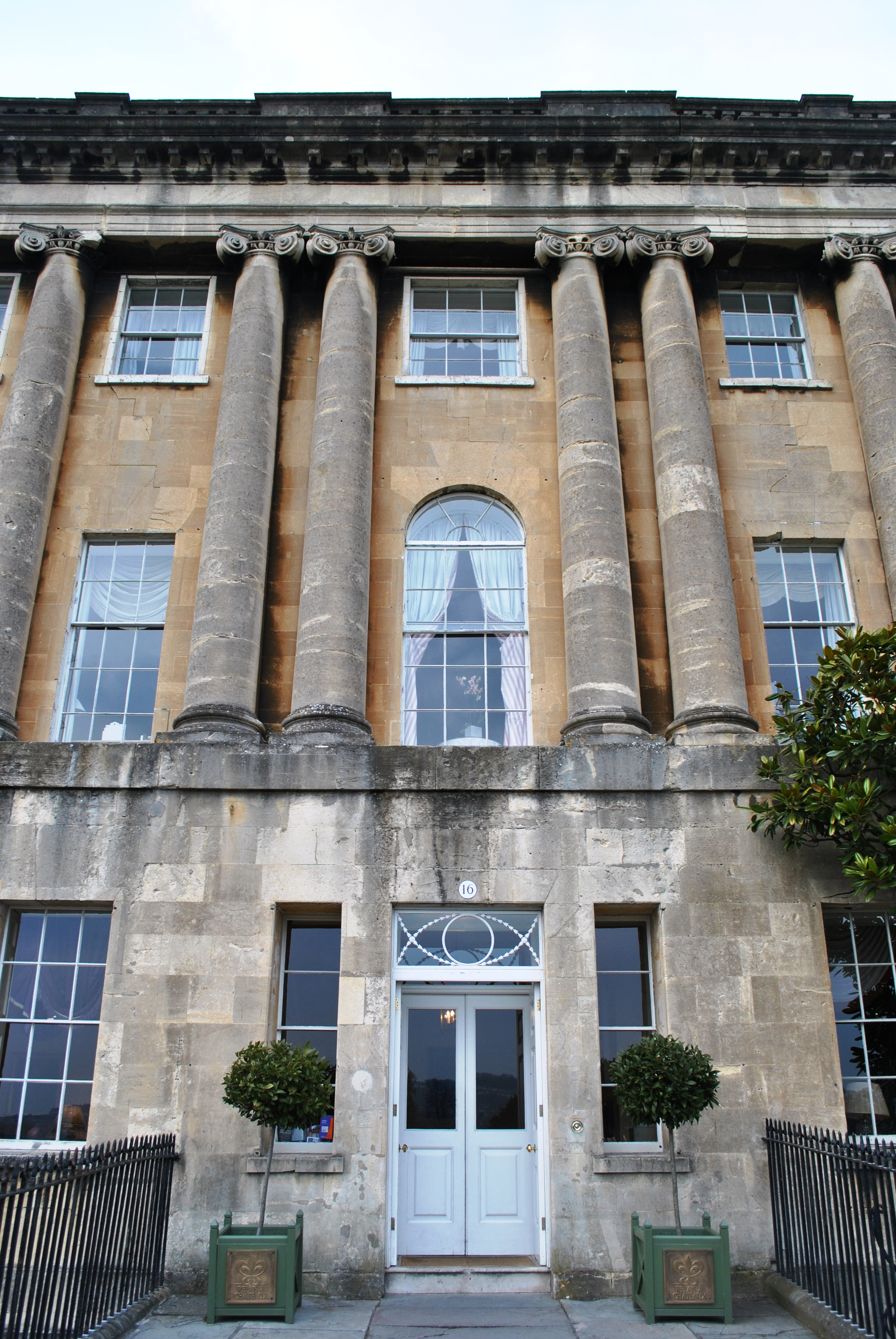
The centre house, 16 Royal Crescent, Bath, was used as a residence and to host Blue Stockings Society events by Elizabeth Montagu

Montagu also held similar events at her residence in the centre house (No. 16) of the Royal Crescent, Bath. In Bath she also lived at Edgar Buildings; Orange Court; Gay Street and Queens Parade.

Some years after Montagu's death, there appeared a poem by James Woodhouse, who had served the family as land bailiff and steward. This criticized her for being proud and vain. Woodhouse wrote that she patronized poets:

For they could best bestow delightful dow'rs, by flattering speech, or fam'd poetic pow'rs.

== Bluestocking work and writing ==
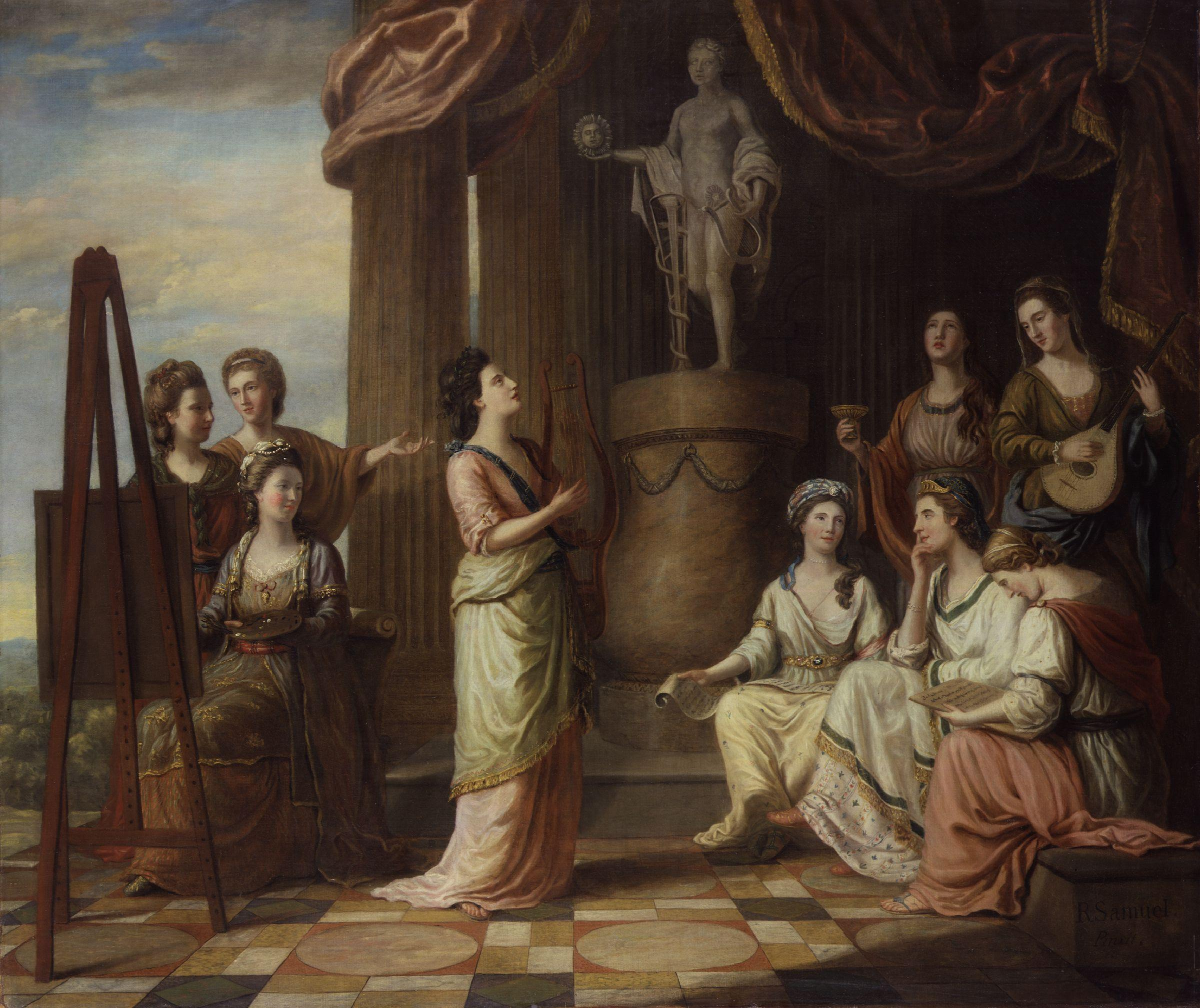
Portraits in the Characters of the Muses in the Temple of Apollo, 1778, 52 x 61 inches, by Richard Samuel. The sitters are: Anna Letitia Barbauld (1743–1825), poet and writer; Elizabeth Carter (1717–1806), scholar and writer; Elizabeth Griffith (1727–1793), playwright and novelist; Angelica Kauffmann (1741–1807), painter; Charlotte Lennox (1720–1804), writer; Catharine Macaulay (1731–1791), historian and political polemicist; Elizabeth Montagu; Hannah More (1745–1833), religious writer; Elizabeth Ann Sheridan (née Linley).

Elizabeth, as a bluestocking, was called the "Queen of the Blues". She led and hosted the Blue Stockings Society of England from about 1750. The loose organization of privileged women with an interest in education waned in popularity at the end of the 18th century. It gathered to discuss literature and also invited educated men to participate. Talk of politics was prohibited; literature and the arts were the main subjects. Many Bluestocking women supported each other in intellectual endeavours such as reading, art work, and writing. Many also published literature.

Elizabeth Montagu published two works in her lifetime. George Lyttelton in 1760 encouraged Elizabeth to write Dialogues of the Dead, and she contributed three sections to the work anonymously. (Her authorship is testified elsewhere.) It consists of a series of conversations between the living and the illustrious dead, and works as a satire of 18th-century vanity and manners. In 1769, she published An Essay on the Writings and Genius of Shakespeare. In it, she proclaims Shakespeare to be the greatest English poet, and in fact the greatest poet of any nation. She also attacks Samuel Johnson's 1765 Preface to Shakespeare for not having gone on to praise Shakespeare's plays enough. While Johnson had dealt with text, history, and the circumstances of editing, Montagu wrote instead about the characters, plots, and beauties of the verse in Shakespeare and saw in him a championing of all things inherently English. When the book was initially published anonymously, it was thought to be by Joseph Warton, but by 1777 her name appeared on the title page. Johnson, for his part, was estranged from Montagu at this point.

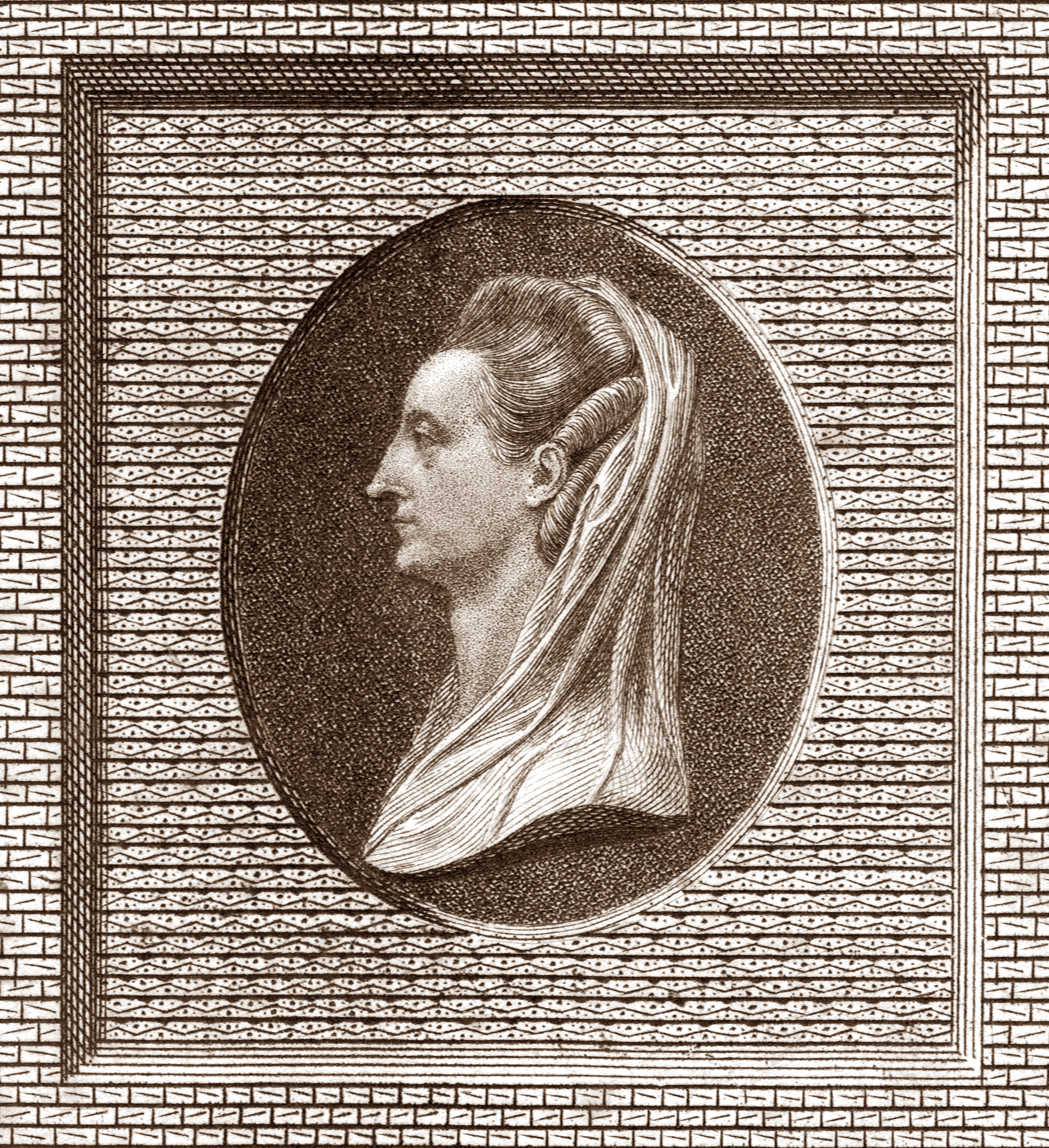
Mrs. Montagu, engraved by Thomas Holloway, published by John Sewell (died 1802), 32 Cornhill, London, 1785.

In the late 1760s, Edward Montagu fell ill, and Elizabeth took care of him, although she resented giving up her freedom. In 1766 her friend John Gregory came to stay and he brought two of his daughters. Montagu was captivated by the two girls and the four of them went on a Scottish tour. When they returned John Gregory had to return home but Montagu persuaded him to leave the "dear dear little girls" with her. In return she undertook to advise him on their education.

In 1770, the Gregorys returned and it was agreed that Montagu would take Dorothea Gregory as her companion. The arrangement worked well as Dorothea took on jobs for her like driving the carriage and being a confidante. Dorothea's future seemed secure but she wanted a partner and Montagu was insistent that the only candidate was her nephew.

Her husband died in 1775. In 1776, she adopted her nephew, the orphan of her brother. Matthew Robinson, the child, kept his family name, but he was named Elizabeth's heir. At that point, the coal and landholdings Montagu passed on to Elizabeth accounted for an income of £7,000 a year. (She managed her wealth and estates well, and by her death her coal income was worth 10,000 pounds a year.) In 1782 Montagu was arranging for her nephew and Dorothea to meet. Dorothea was not attracted to him at all and in the autumn she went on holiday and agreed to marry Archibald Alison (1757–1839). Montagu was still annoyed in 1784 when Dorothea married.

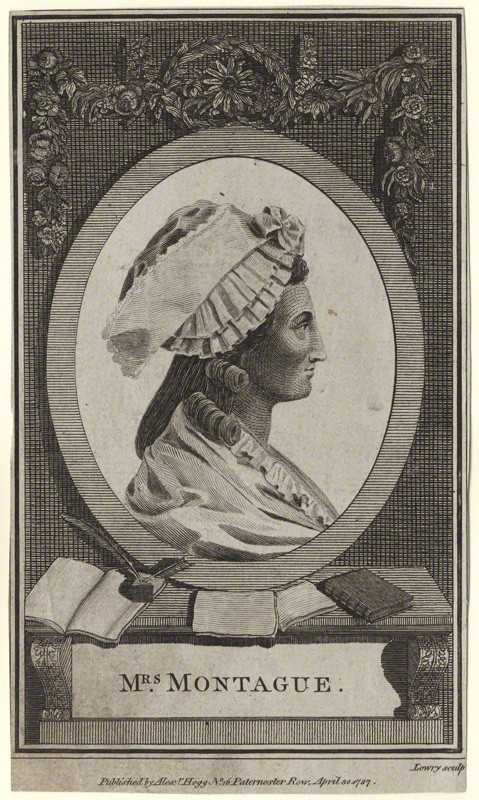
Mrs. Montagu by Wilson Lowry (1762–1824) engraving published London, April 1787

In 1777, Montagu began work on Montagu House in Portman Square in London, where she moved in 1781, on land leased for 99 years. She also expanded Sandleford Priory in the 1780s, and had Capability Brown design its garden and alter the park. She died at Montagu House in London on 25 August 1800 and left Sandleford and all of her money to her nephew.

== Works ==
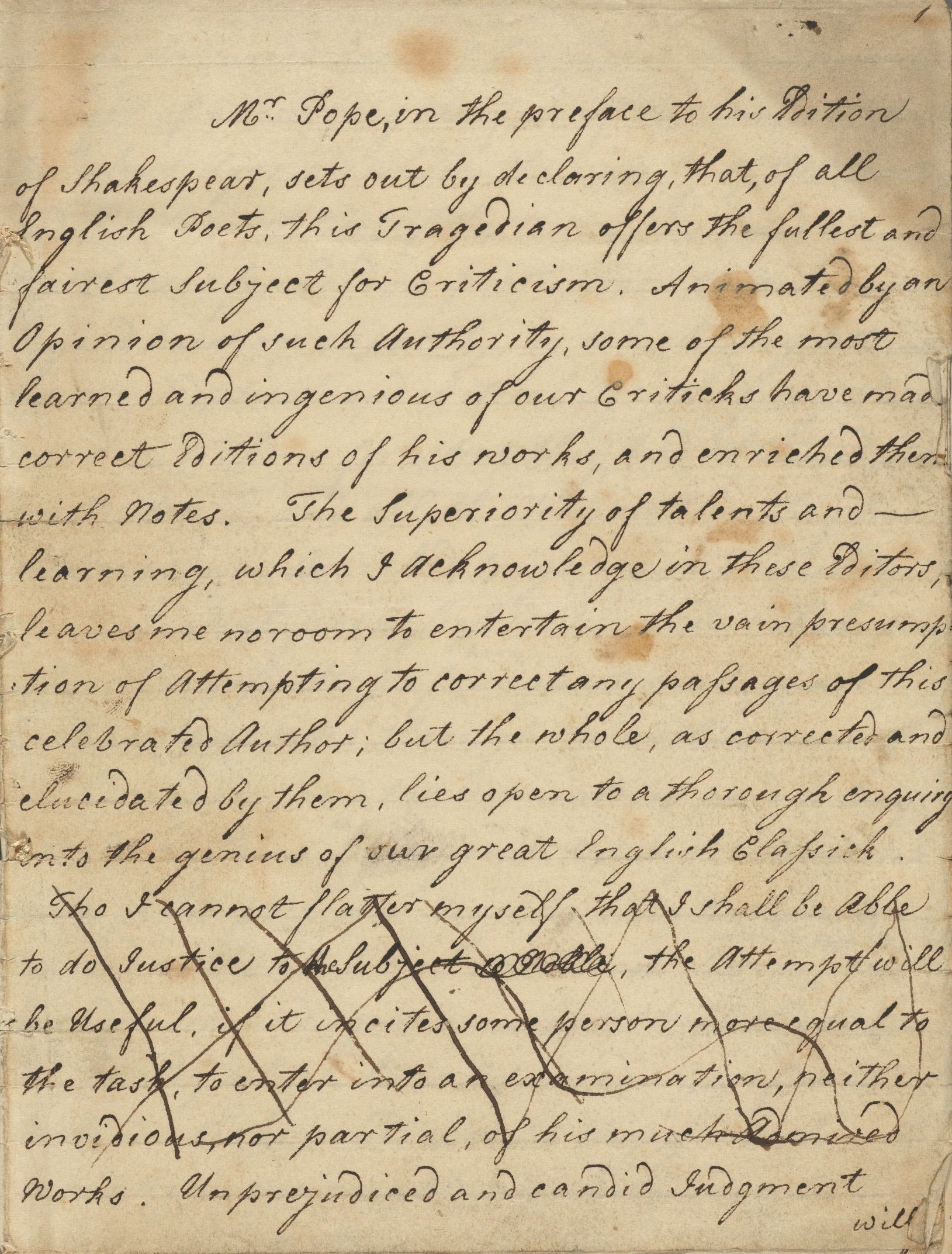
First page of a draft manuscript of An Essay on the Writings and Genius of Shakespear, 1769

Elizabeth Montagu was the author of two works published in her lifetime: three sections in George Lyttelton's Dialogues of the Dead (1760) and An Essay on the Writings and Genius of Shakespeare (1769). In addition, two collections of Montagu's letters were published posthumously.

Dialogues of the Dead was a series of critiques of 18th-century society. In Dialogue 26, Hercules is engaged in a discussion of virtue. In Dialogue 27, a character, Mrs. Mopish, cannot go the Elysian Fields because she is endlessly distracted by worldly influences. In Dialogue 28, a bookseller explains to Plutarch the difficulties of publishing in modern society.

An Essay on the Writings and Genius of Shakespeare defends Shakespeare against criticism by supporters of the French style of drama, particularly against the attacks of Voltaire. In Essay Montagu claims Shakespeare's success comes from his overall virtue and ability to engage the audiences' emotion, not from strict adherence to the classical models of drama.

== Letters ==
Montagu was a copious writer of letters to her coterie and beyond. They include discussions of health, domestic arraignments, travel plans and reports of social events. About a third of her correspondence focuses on culture such as theatre, opera, public spectacles, moral philosophy and divinity. Of these topics, history was discussed more than twice as much as any other topic.

Her most frequent correspondence on literature was with her sister, Sarah Scott, followed by her friends, Elizabeth Carter and Gilbert West. She and Scott were both avid readers of published letters throughout their lives, reading collections by Pope and Swift. This influenced the women's own letter writing. Their frequency of correspondence waxed and waned over the years depending on the circumstances of their lives; Montagu is believed to have written to Scott more frequently than she replied.

Similarly, Montagu is said to have sent more letters to Elizabeth Carter than she received from her. Montagu was an ardent supporter of Carter, despite her friend being of a lower class. She respected her skill and virtue. Montagu felt comfortable enough to correspond with Carter about the responsibility of great wealth.

Gilbert West influenced Montagu's thinking about religion, history and literature. He also affected her style of writing for a time. Based on his example, she began writing in more formal syntax, but eventually became irritated by the restrictions and reverted to her freer, more natural style.

Montagu corresponded with George Lyttelton frequently about literature and history, a relationship which would later lead to Lyttelton to include three of her works in his Dialogues of the Dead. Their letters were known to have markedly different tones: hers were serious and intellectual, his responses tended towards the flirtatious.

Montagu maintained a close relationship with the elder statesman, William Pulteney, Lord Bath. This was purely emotional, but described as a "pseudo-courtship".

Lady Margaret Harley, Duchess of Portland was a lifelong friend of Montagu's, to whom Montagu vented her frustrations over the institution of marriage and her desire for a truly companionate marriage – if she must have one at all. Montagu also said that marriage should include a financial incentive.

A collection of Montagu's letters was first published 1809 by her nephew and heir, Matthew Montagu, under the title, The Letters of Mrs. Elizabeth Montagu, with Some of the Letters of her Correspondents. The selection reflects a concern for Montagu's moral reputation. Another edition of her letters was released in 1906 by Matthew's granddaughter, Emily J. Climenson, and her friend, Reginald Blunt. This revised collection expanded on Montagu's view of the social world, including fashion, politics, and nobility.

== Politics ==
Elizabeth Montagu was interested in the political debates of her day and she contributed to the political process in the various ways open to her as an elite woman and female intellectual. Within the context of these male relationships, particularly via her husband and friends George Lyttleton and William Pulteney (the Earl of Bath) Montagu had an opportunity to discuss political philosophy as well as practical politics; developing her own political positions. She represented her interest in the political realm as an extension of family duty and expression of female tenderness. She was therefore able to forward her own opinions within the prevailing gender conventions of the time without appearing transgressive.

== Legacy ==
Swansea University aims to produce a fully annotated, digital, critical, and open-access edition of the extant correspondence of Elizabeth Montagu. Elizabeth Montagu Correspondence Online (EMCO) offers access to transcriptions and facsimiles of original manuscripts, accurate and exhaustive notes, and the most recently discovered letters.

The Royal Crescent Hotel in Bath is located at a former residence of Elizabeth Montagu 16 Royal Crescent. In May a new restaurant Montagu Mews was opened and named in her honour.
