= Thomas Walmsley (painter) =

English landscape painter

- Born: 1763; Ireland
- Died: 1805 (aged 41–42); Bath, England
- Occupation: Landscape painter

Thomas Walmsley (1763–1805) was an English landscape painter.

== Biography ==
Walmsley was descended from a family of good position at Rochdale, Lancashire, but was born in Ireland in 1763, his father, Thomas Walmsley, captain-lieutenant of the 18th dragoons, being quartered there with his regiment at the time. He quarrelled with his family, and came to London to earn his living. He studied scene-painting under Columba at the opera-house, and was himself employed there and at Covent Garden Theatre, and at the Crow Street Theatre, Dublin. In 1790 he began to exhibit landscapes in London, where he resided until 1795, when he retired to Bath. He sent many pictures to the Royal Academy, chiefly views in Wales; but in 1796, the last year in which he exhibited, three views of Killarney. He painted chiefly in body-colour. His trees were heavy and conventional, and he had no capacity for drawing figures, but he was skilful in painting skies, especially with a warm evening glow, which was well reproduced in the coloured aquatints by Francis Jukes and others, through which he is best known. Of these several series were published both before and after his death: views of the Dee and North Wales, 1792–4; larger views of North Wales, 1800; views of Killarney and Kenmare, 1800–2; miscellaneous British scenery, 1801; views in Bohemia, 1801; views of the Isle of Wight, 1802–3; miscellaneous Irish scenery, 1806; views in Scotland, 1810. Walmsley died at Bath in 1805.
