= Richard Samuel =

British painter

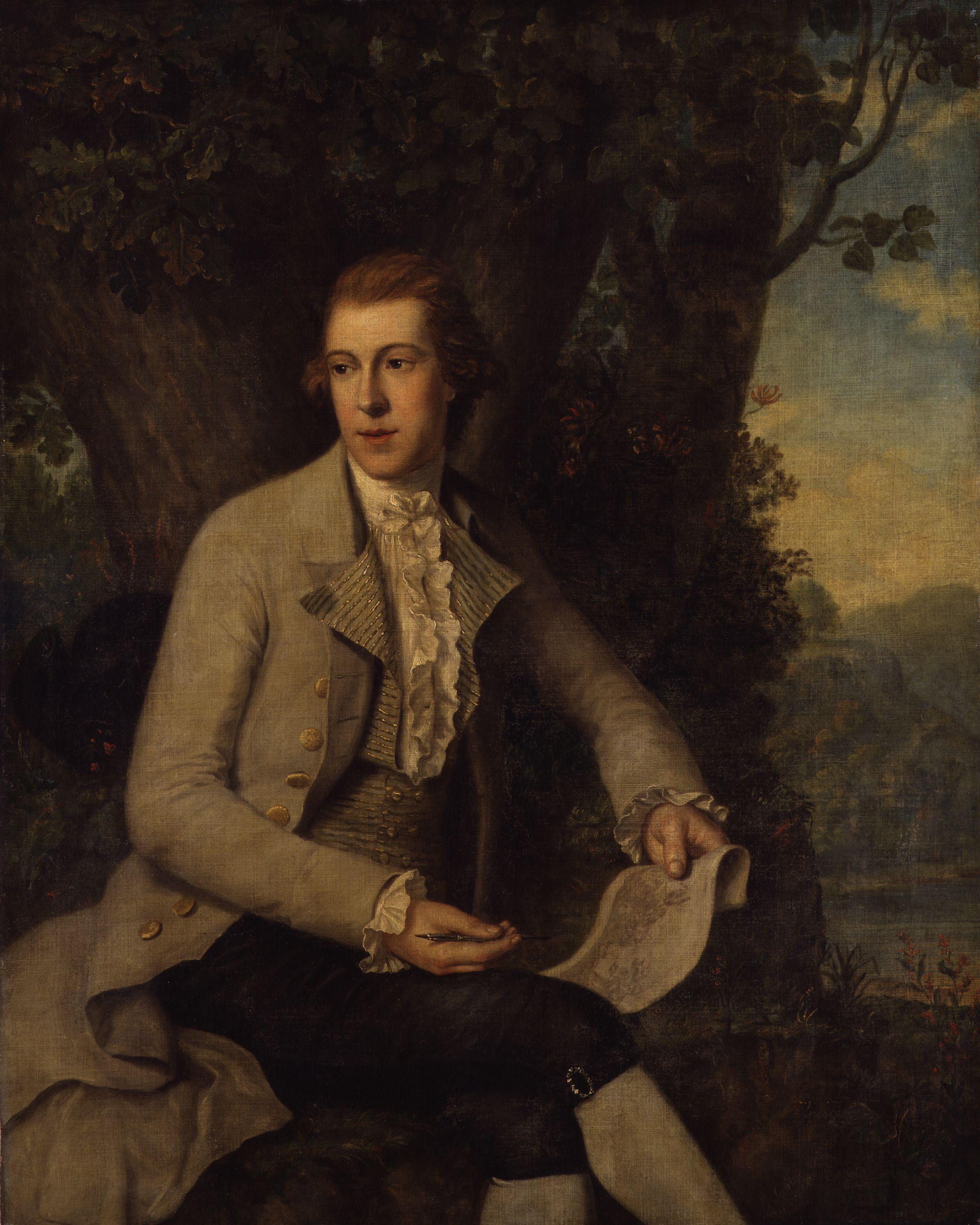
Robert Pollard by Richard Samuel, 1784. National Portrait Gallery, London.

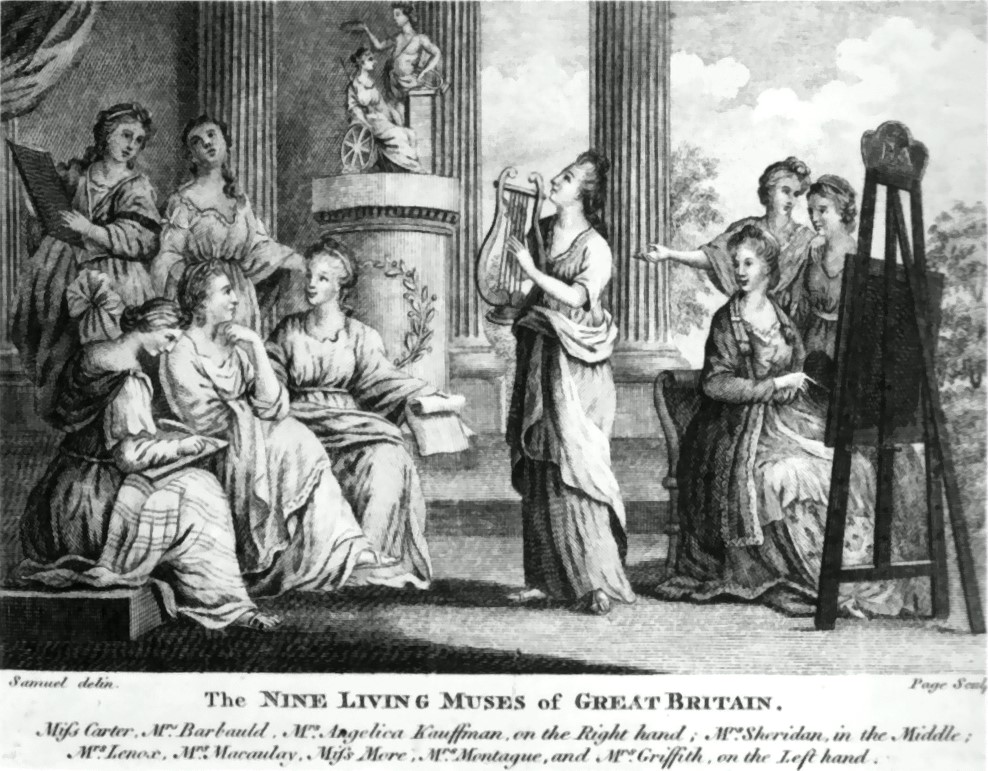
The 1777 print showing Britannia rather than Apollo.

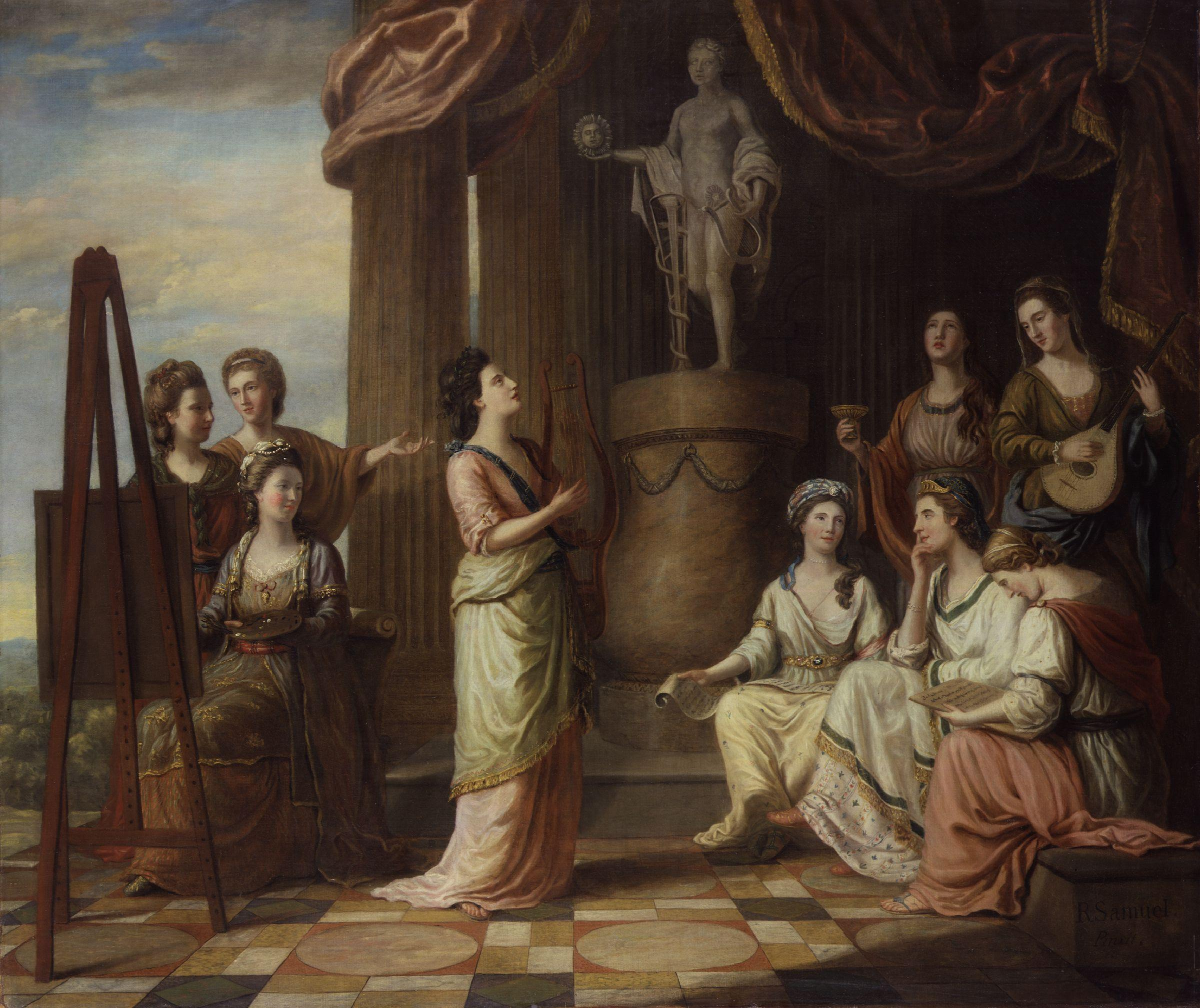
Portraits in the Characters of the Muses in the Temple of Apollo by Richard Samuel, 1778, include Elizabeth Carter, Angelica Kauffman, Anna Laetitia Barbauld, Catharine Macaulay, Elizabeth Montagu, Elizabeth Griffith, Hannah More, Elizabeth Ann Sheridan and Charlotte Lennox. Use a cursor to see who is who.

Richard Samuel (fl. 1770–1786) was an English portrait painter who won several prestigious medals in the 1770s in London. He is known for a small number of paintings including what came to be known as The Nine Living Muses of Great Britain of 1778 in which he painted the nine leading blue stocking women of his time.

== Early life ==
The parents, childhood and artistic training of Richard Samuel are not known.

== Career ==
Samuel came to notice when he twice won the prestigious award from the Society of Artists for the best historical drawing. He had entered the Royal Academy's schools in 1770. Later he was given money for creating an improvement in the techniques for applying mezzotint grounds, although strangely there are no surviving examples of Samuel's art that use this technique. His work consisted of conversation pieces, whole length paintings and portraits. Several of these were chosen and exhibited at the exhibitions at the Royal Academy between 1772 and 1779. In 1779 Samuel took a job as an assistant secretary at the Royal Academy (which he kept until his death).

Samuel did a larger than usual portrait of Robert Pollard, the engraver. This work was in the style of Thomas Gainsborough and shows Pollard who was an idiosyncratic printseller who made a substantial living from his work.

== Nine living muses ==
In 1777, Samuel produced a print showing the portraits of nine of the leading "blue stocking" women of his time shown as the nine Muses of the classical world.

Samuel had chosen leading women from different areas of achievement in line with idea of the Nine Muses of mythology. His choice of poet was Anna Laetitia Barbauld, and Elizabeth Carter was the scholar. Angelica Kauffman was the only founding female member of the Royal Academy; Elizabeth Griffith was a playwright; Charlotte Lennox was a writer whilst Catharine Macaulay was a historian. The last three were Elizabeth Montagu, a leader of society, Hannah More, a religious writer and playwright, and the singer Elizabeth Ann Sheridan.

In 1778, Samuel painted the women on a speculative basis without taking sittings in an attempt to advance his career as a portrait and history painter. The resulting work was exhibited at the exhibition in 1778 where it attracted little attention. The figures in the painting were so idealised, possibly because of the lack of sittings, that Elizabeth Carter complained that she couldn't identify herself or anyone else in the picture.

== Final years ==
In 1786, the year that he died, Samuel published a short work that was titled On the utility of drawing and painting. It has been supposed that as his work does not appear to have ever fully developed (or that he retired), he died at a young age.

== Legacy ==
Samuel has only a limited number of works, but they are well placed. A few are at the National Portrait Gallery in London whilst others are at the Tate Gallery. His painting of the nine muses is used as emblematic of the emergence of bluestockings in the eighteenth century.

Samuels painting of the nine muses has been notably recreated by Derry Moore's 1996 photograph which is also in London's National Portrait Gallery. Moore's photograph includes a contemporary selection of notable British women including Darcey Bussell and Vivienne Westwood.
