= Edward Dayes =

English painter

Edward Dayes (1763 in London – May 1804 in London) was an English watercolour painter and engraver in mezzotint.

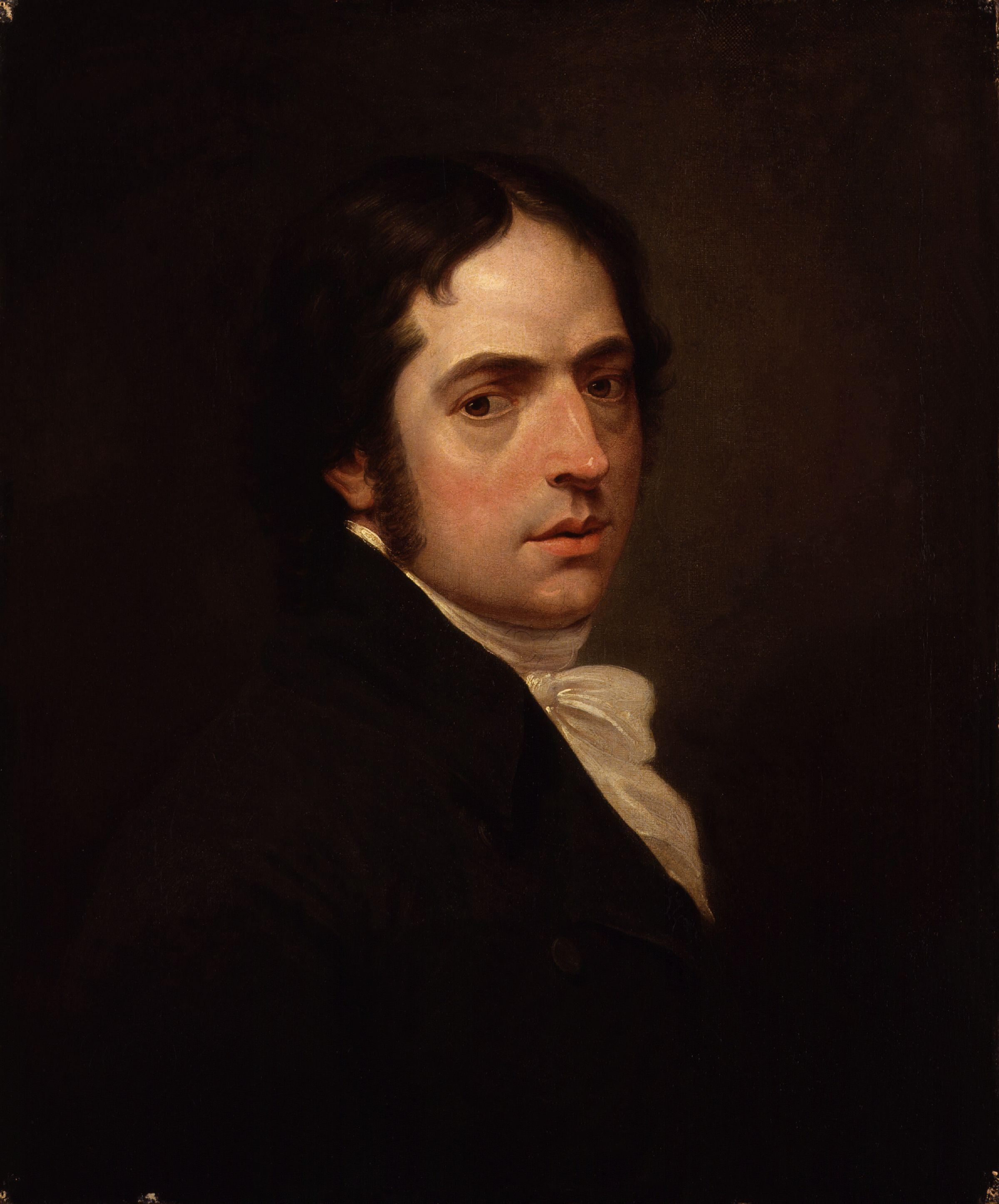
Edward Dayes, self-portrait from 1801.

== Life ==
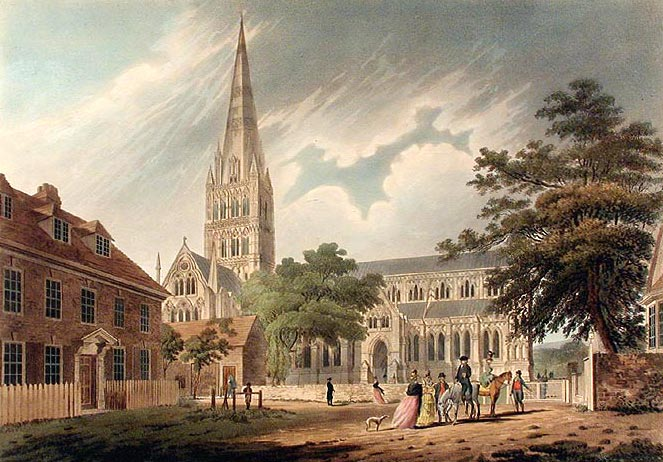
Salisbury Cathedral, 1798 engraving by Francis Jukes, after Dayes.

He studied under William Pether, and began to exhibit at the Royal Academy in 1786, when he showed a portrait and views of Waltham Cross and Canterbury. In the three following years he exhibited both miniatures and landscapes. He continued to exhibit at the Academy regularly until the year of his death, contributing a total of 64 works. He also was an exhibitor at the Society of Artists.

Dayes drew from nature in various parts of England, including the Lake District and Wales. Much of his topographical work depicted ruins, painted in a palette dominated by blues and greens, which had an influence on the early work of J. M. W. Turner. He laid out detailed rules for the correct method of laying down the colours in landscape in his Instructions for Drawing and Colouring Landscapes, published posthumously. The art historian Graham Reynolds sees Dayes' work as "mark[ing] the transition from the eighteenth to the nineteenth century".

Many of his drawings were crowded with figures; among these were two views of the interior of St. Paul's Cathedral on the occasion of the thanksgiving for the king's recovery in 1789, The Trial of Warren Hastings in Westminster Abbey, and Buckingham House, St. James's Park (1780), later hung in the South Kensington Museum. All these works were engraved. In 1798 Dayes began to show scriptural subjects, such as The Fall of the Angels (1798), John preaching in the Wilderness (1799), the Triumph of Beauty (1800), and Elisha causing Iron to swim (1801).

He was draughtsman to the Duke of York and Albany. Thomas Girtin was his pupil.

Dayes engraved at least four mezzotints, one after George Morland, another after John Raphael Smith, and two humorous scenes called Rustic Courtship and Polite Courtship. He wrote an Excursion through Derbyshire and Yorkshire, Essays on Painting, Instructions for Drawing and Colouring Landscapes, and Professional Sketches of Modern Artists. He committed suicide at the end of May 1804. After his death his works were collected and edited by E. W. Bradley, and published for the benefit of his widow in 1805.

His wife painted miniatures and exhibited four works at the Royal Academy between 1797 and 1800.

== Sources ==
- This article incorporates text from a publication now in the public domain: Stephen, Leslie, ed. (1888). "Dayes, Edward". Dictionary of National Biography. Vol. 14. London: Smith, Elder & Co.
