= James Pollard =

British painter (1792–1867)

James Pollard (1792–1867) was a British painter noted for his mail coach, fox hunting and equine scenes.

Kidd's Omnibus outside the Angel Inn, Brentford, c. 1840

== Life ==
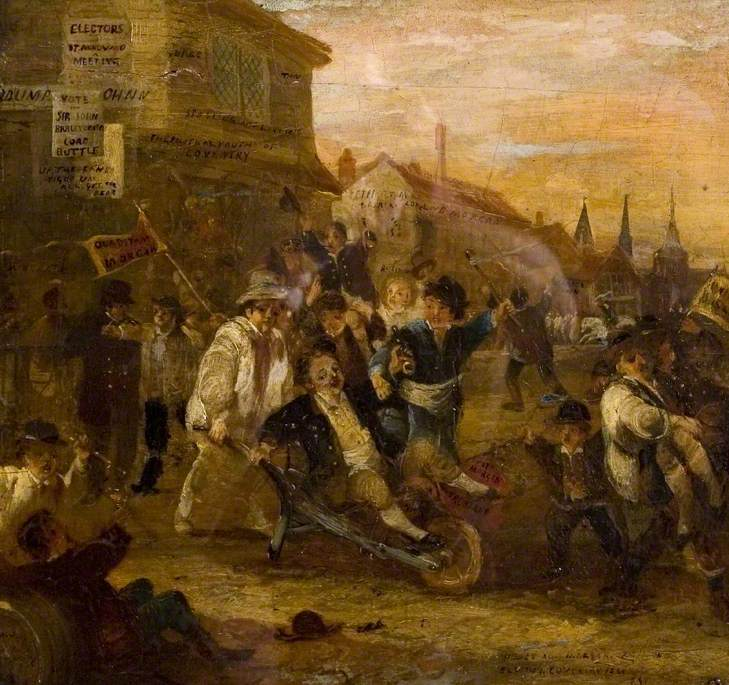
Election Riot at Coventry, c.1861

Pollard was born in Baynes Spa Fields (later renamed Exmouth Street) in Islington, the son of the painter and publisher Robert Pollard (1755–1838).

Between 1821 and 1839, James Pollard exhibited at the Royal Academy. He exhibited at the British Institution in 1824 and 1844. During his career, he also worked with John Frederick Herring Sr. on several horse racing paintings in which he painted the backgrounds and spectators while Herring painted the horses.

Many of his compositions were published as aquatints, although, unlike his father, he engraved only a few plates himself.

James Pollard died in Chelsea in 1867 and is buried at St Mary's, Hornsey beside his father Robert.
