= Monks Horton =

Civil parish in Kent, England

Coordinates: 51°7′13″N 1°1′15″E

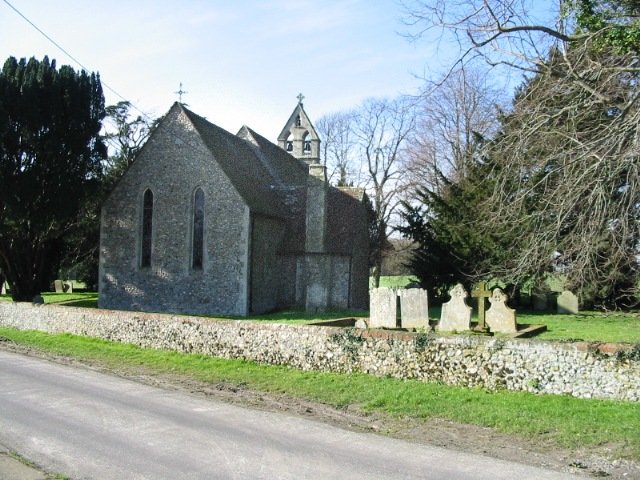
The Church of St Peter, Monks Horton

Monks Horton is a small civil parish in the Folkestone and Hythe district of Kent, England. It is located 3 miles (5 km) north of Hythe. Within the civil parish are the hamlets of Horton and Broad Street. The parish is governed by a parish meeting, rather than a parish council, because of its small size. The name comes from there having been a medieval priory built here.

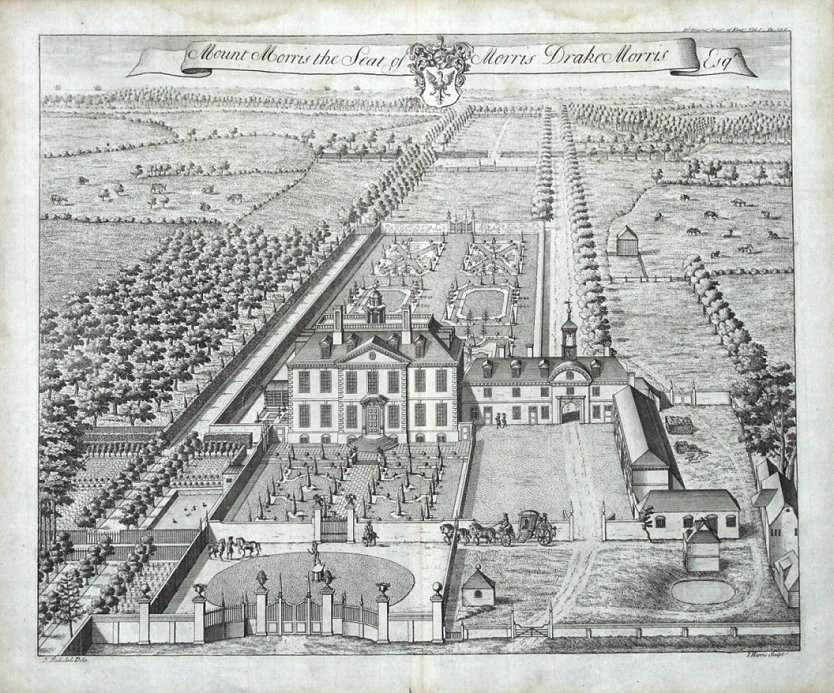
Mount Morris, Monks Horton, the Seat of Morris Drake Morris, Esq. Engraved by Johannes Kip after Thomas Badeslade, 1719.

The population of the parish in 2001 was 95.

== In popular culture ==
Author Russell Hoban repurposes Monks Horton as "Monkeys Whoar Town" in his 1980, post apocalyptic novel Riddley Walker.
