= 1758 in literature =

This article contains information about the literary events and publications of 1758.

== Events ==
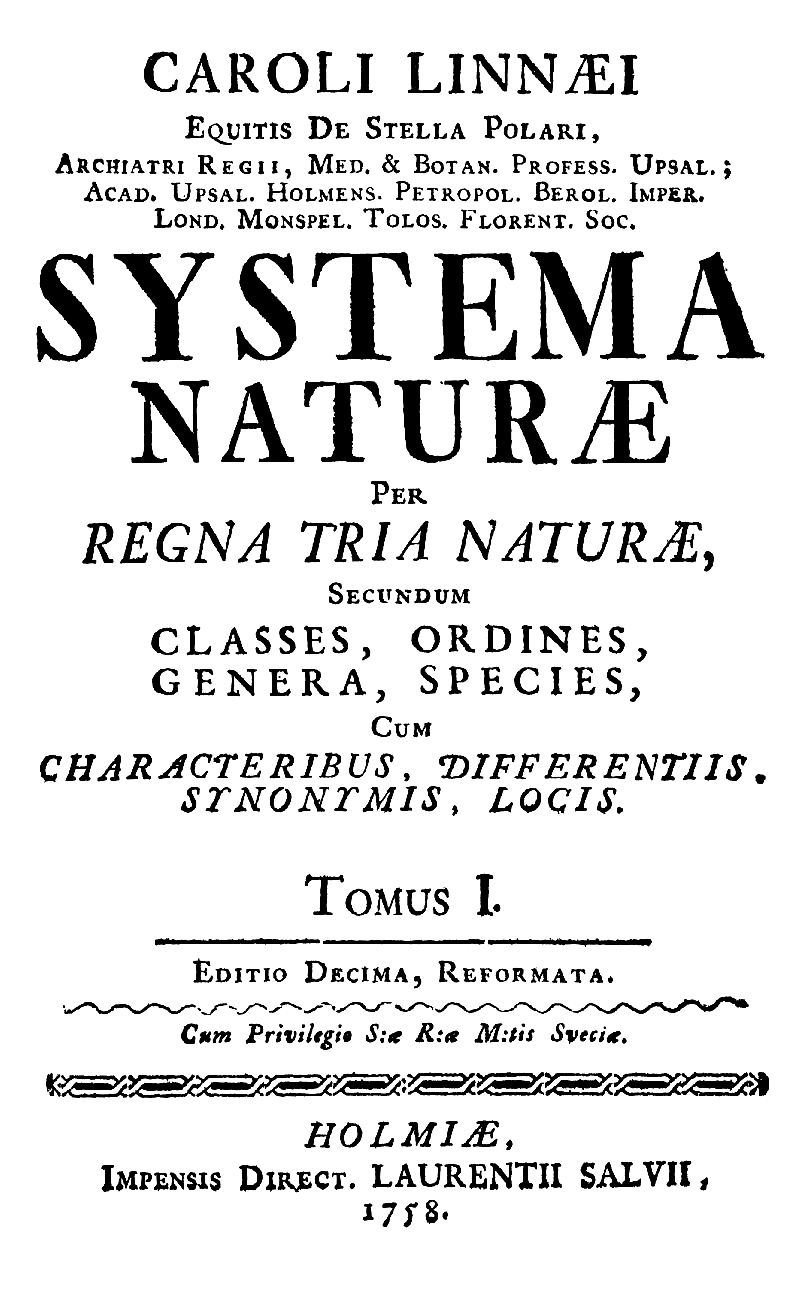
Title page of the 10th edition of Systema Naturae

- April 15 – Samuel Johnson begins publishing a series of essays, The Idler (1758–1760), in the Universal Chronicle.
- April 24 – Robert Dodsley and his brother James sign a contract with Edmund Burke to launch The Annual Register.
- April 27 – The French historian Jean-François Marmontel enters the service of Madame de Pompadour.
- July/August – The poet and children's writer Anna Laetitia Barbauld and her family move to Warrington in North West England.
- October – Voltaire buys an estate at Ferney in eastern France.
- unknown date – The French mathematician and philosopher Pierre Louis Maupertuis moves to his final home in Basel, Switzerland.

== New books ==
=== Fiction ===
- Charlotte Lennox – Henrietta
- Madame (Riccoboni) – Histoire du marquis de Cressy
- Horace Walpole – A Dialogue Between Two Great Ladies

=== Drama ===
- John Cleland – Tombo-Chiqui, or, The American Savage (not produced)
- Denis Diderot – Le Père de famille
- Robert Dodsley – Cleone
- David Garrick – Florizel and Perdita
- John Home – Aegis
- Charlotte Lennox – Philander
- Arthur Murphy – The Upholsterer
- George Alexander Stevens – Albion Restored

=== Poetry ===
- Mark Akenside – An Ode to the Country Gentlemen
- Anica Bošković – Dijalog
- John Gilbert Cooper – The Call of Aristippus
- Johann Wilhelm Ludwig Gleim – Preussische Kriegslieder von einem Grenadier (Prussian War Songs of a Grenadier)
- Eugenio Gerardo Lobo – Obras poéticas
- James Macpherson – The Highlander
- Heyat Mahmud – Āmbiyābāṇī; Bengali
- Thomas Parnell – Posthumous Works

=== Non-fiction ===
- John Armstrong as Launcelot Temple – Sketches, or, Essays on Various Subjects
- William Blackstone – A Discourse on the Study of Law
- Rev. Dr. John Brown – An Explanatory Defence of the Estimate of the Manners and Principles of the Times (2nd volume)
- Andrés Marcos Burriel – Paleografía española
- Elizabeth Carter (translator) – All the Works of Epictetus Which Are Now Extant
- José Francisco de Isla – Historia del famoso predicador Fray Gerundio de Campazas, alias Zotes
- Benjamin Franklin – Father Abraham's Sermon
- Oliver Goldsmith as "James Willington" – The Memoirs of a Protestant
- William Hawkins – Tracts in Divinity
- Claude Adrien Helvétius – De l'Esprit
- Henry Home – Historical Law-Tracts
- Carl Linnaeus – Systema Naturae (10th edition), Tomus I, Animalia
- Robert Lowth – The Life of William of Wykeham
- Thomas Marryat – Therapeutics, or a New Practice of Physic (original version, in Latin)
- Antoine-Joseph Pernety
  - Dictionnaire mytho-hermétique, dans lequel on trouve les allégories fabuleuses des poètes, les métaphores, les énigmes et les termes barbares des philosophes hermétiques expliqués
  - Les Fables égyptiennes et grecques dévoilées et réduites au même principe, avec une explication des hiéroglyphes et de la guerre de Troye
- Antoine Simon Le Page Du Pratz – Histoire de la Louisiane (History of Louisiana)
- Richard Price – A Review of the Principal Questions and Difficulties in Morals
- Emanuel Swedenborg
  - Earths in the Universe
  - Heaven and Hell
  - New Jerusalem and its Heavenly Doctrine
  - The Last Judgement
- Jonathan Swift – The History of the Last Four Years of the Queen
- Horace Walpole
  - A Catalogue of the Royal and Noble Authors of England
  - Fugitive Pieces
- Arthur Young – The Theatre of the Present War in North America

== Births ==
- January 12 – Dmitry Gorchakov, Russian writer, dramatist and poet (died 1824)
- February 3
  - Vasily Kapnist, Ukrainian poet and playwright (died 1823)
  - Valentin Vodnik, Carniolan Slovene poet, writer and priest (died 1819)
- February 10 – Amalia Holst, German writer, intellectual, and feminist (died 1829)
- March 15 – Magdalene Sophie Buchholm, Norwegian poet (died 1826)
- April 30 – Jane West (Prudentia Homespun), English novelist and writer of conduct books (died 1852)
- October 16 – Noah Webster, American lexicographer (died 1843)
- December 9 – Richard Colt Hoare, English antiquary, archeologist and traveler (died 1838)

== Deaths ==
- January 7 – Allan Ramsay the Elder, Scottish poet (born 1686)
- March 22 – Jonathan Edwards, American theologian and preacher (born 1703)
- October – Theophilus Cibber, English dramatist and actor (born 1703; lost at sea)
- October 27 bur. – Elizabeth Blackwell, Scottish botanic writer and illustrator (born 1707)
- December 25 – James Hervey, English religious writer and cleric (born 1714)
