= Cleone =

Cleone may refer to:

- Cleon, ancient Athenian statesman
- Cleone (play), a 1758 work by Robert Dodsley
- Cleone (engine), aircraft engine
- Cleone, California, community in Mendocino County
- Cleone (mythology), Naiad in Greek mythology
