= Sophia (novel) =

1762 novel by Charlotte Lennox

- Author: Charlotte Lennox
- Language: English
- Genre: Fiction
- Publisher: Broadview Press
- Publication place: England
- ISBN: 9781551116419

Sophia is a romance novel published in 1762 by Charlotte Lennox, a British novelist best known for her 1752 satirical novel The Female Quixote. Originally published in Lennox's periodical The Lady's Museum as Harriet and Sophia between 1760-1, this novel is only the second British novel to be serialized in a magazine, and the first one to be published this way by a woman.

== Major characters ==
- Sophia Darnley – Mr. Darnley's younger daughter. Sophia attracts Sir Charles Stanley away from her sister but, because of her poverty, doubts his honorable intentions. She ends up treating him coldly, which leads him to doubt her love. Eventually Mr. Herbert helps her win him over.
- Harriet Darnley – Sophia Darnley's older sister. She is more beautiful than her sister, but is also vain, supercilious, and expensive. She attracts seducers rather than honorable lovers and eventually becomes mistress to Lord L—, loses her beauty to jaundice, and winds up unhappily married to a peruke maker turned ensign.
- Mr. Darnley – Sophia's father. A gentleman, he marries a beautiful and expensive wife, squanders his fortune and dies, leaving his family in poverty.
- Sir Charles Stanley – Wealthy, handsome would-be seducer of Harriet Darnley. Though he initially has his eye on Harriet, he ends up falling in love with Sophia Darnley and becomes her family's benefactor. However, once he begins doubting the sincerity of Sophia's love, he retracts his favor. He is reconciled to Sophia through the efforts of Mr. Herbert.
- Mr. Herbert – Mr. Darnley's relation and family adviser. He helps protect Sophia Darnley from her rapacious mother and sister by lodging her with the respectable Lawsons, and intercedes with Sir Charles Stanley to bring about the happy ending.

== Minor characters ==
- Dolly Lawson – The Curate's daughter. Dolly is an innocent country girl who becomes Sophia Darnley's friend and confidante; she loves William Gibbons but is prevented from marrying him due to the objections of his aunt. Sophia eventually makes peace between the two families.
- William Gibbons – Farmer's son. He is educated as a gentleman by his aunt, though he prefers to follow in his father's path and become a farmer. While he is talking to Sophia about his romantic difficulties, he is seen by Sir Charles Stanley and mistaken for a rival for Sophia's affections.
- Mr. Lawson – Country curate. Mr. Lawson is paid by Mr. Herbert to take Sophia Darnley in when Sir Charles Stanley's attentions take a suspicious turn.
- Mrs. Lawson – Sensible and polite wife of the curate Mr. Lawson. Her ridicule of Mrs. Gibbons leads that lady to break her daughter Dolly Lawson's engagement to William Gibbons.
- Mrs. Gibbons – William Gibbons's aunt and godmother. Mrs. Gibbons is proud of her false and rigid “good breeding.” She takes offense at Mrs. Lawson's raillery and forbids the match between Dolly Lawson and William.
- Mr. Gibbons – William Gibbons's father. He is a farmer.
- Mr. Howard – Mrs. Howard's nineteen-year-old son. His love for Sophia Darnley enrages his mother and leads to Sophia's dismissal.
- Mrs. Barton – Mr. Barton's mother. Resenting Mrs. Howard's attempt to marry the penniless Sophia Darnley to her son, she informs her that young Mr. Howard also loves Sophia. She conspires to brand Sophia as a man-trap.
- Lord L— – A young nobleman whom Harriot Darnley uses to make Sir Charles Stanley jealous. He initially takes Harriet as mistress, but becomes disgusted with her when she boasts that she is his wife and casts her off to make an advantageous marriage.
