= The Annual Register =

History journal, 1758 to present

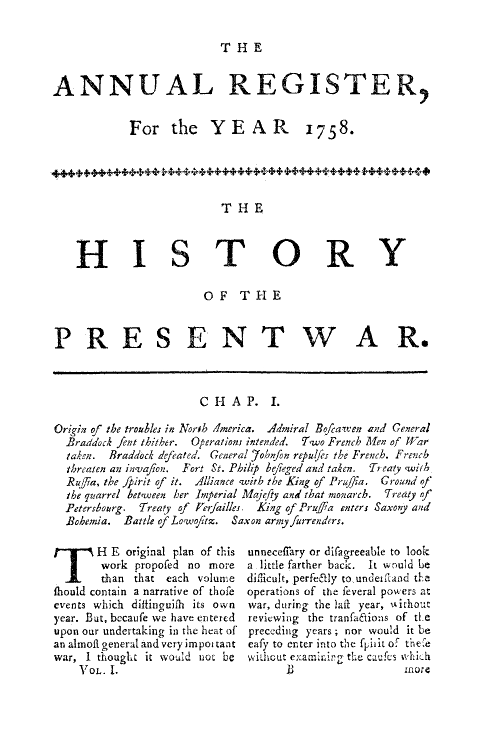
- The opening page of the first volume of The Annual Register
- Edited by: Edmund Burke (founding editor)
- Original title: The Annual Register: A View of the History, Politicks and Literature of the Year
- Country: United Kingdom (1758–1994); United States (1995–)
- Language: English
- Discipline: Reference work: World history and politics
- Publisher: James and Robert Dodsley (1758–1793); F. & J. Rivington / Longman (1793–1994); Cartermill (1995–1996); Keesing's Worldwide (1996); Cambridge Scientific Abstracts (subsequently merged with ProQuest) (2005–)
- Published: 1758–present
- Media type: Print, later Print & Digital
- No. of books: 258 (as of 2016)
- Website: www.proquest.com/products-services/ann_reg.html

The Annual Register (originally subtitled "A View of the History, Politicks and Literature of the Year ...") is a long-established reference work, written and published each year, which records and analyses the year's major events, developments and trends throughout the world. It was first written in 1758 under the editorship of Edmund Burke, and has been produced continuously since that date. In its current form the first half of the book comprises articles on each of the world's countries or regions, while the latter half contains articles on international organisations, economics, the environment, science, law, religion, the arts and sport, together with obituaries, a chronicle of major events and selected documents. In addition to being produced annually in hardback, the book is also published electronically, and its entire 260-year archive is available online from its publisher, ProQuest.

== Edmund Burke and the creation of The Annual Register ==
The Annual Register was created in 1758 by the publishers James and Robert Dodsley. On 24 April 1758 the Dodsley brothers signed a contract with Edmund Burke (1729–97) to write and edit the material for The Annual Register, which was conceived as an annual publication which would review the history, politics and literature of the day. Born in Ireland, Burke had trained as a lawyer before abandoning this field and turning to writing. He was an up-and-coming member of the intelligentsia and had already written several notable works, published by Dodsley. According to his contract with Dodsley, Burke was paid £100 per annum as editor of The Annual Register.

In its original form, The Annual Register comprised a long historical essay on the "History of the Present War" (the Seven Years' War 1756–63), a Chronology, which gave an account of interesting and noteworthy events in Britain over the previous year, and a collection of "State Papers", a miscellany of primary source material which included official documents, speeches, letters and accounts. In his preface to the 1758 volume Burke noted the difficulties he had faced in writing the history section of the book. Taking the "broken and unconnected materials" and creating from them "one connected narrative" had been, he commented, "a work of more labour than may at first appear". Nevertheless, his perseverance and skill as a historian meant that by the time of its publication the first volume of The Annual Register contained a unique, contemporaneous account of the war, analysing its origins and development with a perspective not readily available at the time in newspapers or magazines. As a result, the book sold widely, with the first volume going through five editions in its first 10 years.

Given the conventions of the day, within which journalism was seen as a disreputable profession for a gentleman, Burke was publicly reticent about his connection with The Annual Register. However, his biographers are in agreement that Burke wrote and edited the book single-handedly until 1765, when he entered Parliament. From this time Thomas English was closely involved in writing the book and is regarded by some authorities as having taken over the editorship from Burke in that year. Scholars are divided on the question of Burke's association with the book thereafter, although many suggest that he continued to contribute to the history section and that he played a significant role in overseeing The Annual Register's compilation until the 1790s, even though much of the editorial work by this stage was being done by others.

== Competing editions ==
By the 1760s The Annual Register had established itself as amongst the most respected journals in print. However, the immense scale of the work meant that its early years were characterised by frequent delays in publication and a chaotic period in the late eighteenth and early nineteenth centuries when there were two competing versions of the title, each claiming to be its legitimate incarnation.

Having been created in 1758, The Annual Register was published by the Dodsley brothers until 1763 and, following Robert Dodsley's death, by James Dodsley alone until 1790. The sequence of Dodsley volumes was confused, however, by the practice of falsely dating a number of first editions in order to conceal the increasing delays (on occasions up to three years) between the year of publication and the year of the events described within a particular volume. A number of reprints and "counterfeit firsts" were also issued during the Dodsley period.

Following the publication of the 1790 volume in December 1793, Dodsley disposed of The Annual Register. He sold the stock and copyright of the volumes already issued to Messrs Otridge and assigned responsibility for future volumes to another publisher, Rivington. Under the new publisher the delays increased further, with the 1792 volume of the "Genuine" Annual Register not appearing until September 1798 (three months after the death of Thomas English) and the 1793 volume not being printed until July 1806. During this period Otridge produced volumes of its own "Original" Annual Register, covering the missing years and selling them at 8 shillings, compared with the 13 shillings charged by Rivington. Faced with this competition from a rival with greater resources, Rivington attempted to make good the arrears while also bringing out subsequent volumes more promptly. Some ground was recovered, although a number of years had still not been produced (1813–19) when Rivington finally went into partnership with Baldwin Craddock and Joy, a publisher which had already acquired a major share of Otridge in 1815. Thus, from the 1825 edition (produced in 1826) the competing Annual Registers were combined by Baldwin and Co. into a single title.

== Subsequent developments ==
During the remainder of the nineteenth century The Annual Register was published without major difficulty. Following the end of the Napoleonic Wars in 1815, it had adopted a format which gave a number of chapters to the history of Britain and followed closely the proceedings of Parliament. There followed chapters covering other countries in turn, no longer confined only to Europe. Its expanded history section meant that there was less of the miscellaneous material which had characterised its earlier volumes. Nevertheless, poetry remained included until 1862 and the book continued to reflect topical issues of the day.

In 1947 The Annual Register acquired an advisory board for the first time consisting of the then editor, Ivison Macadam, the assistant editor, Hugh Latimer, and five representatives nominated by: the English Association, the Arts Council of Great Britain, the British Association for the Advancement of Science, the Royal Institute of International Affairs, and the Royal Historical Society. Explaining this innovation, Macadam stated in the preface to the 1947 volume that it was "a recognition of the need for specialisation in these complicated times".

In 1994, after a century's ownership by Longman, The Annual Register was transferred to Cartermill. In 1996 it was sold to a US publisher, Keesing's Worldwide, which oversaw the process of digitising the book's extensive archive and making this available for the first time to subscribers. In late 2005 the title was bought by another US publisher, Cambridge Scientific Abstracts, which subsequently became ProQuest.

=== List of editors ===
Although it is agreed that Edmund Burke was the first editor of The Annual Register and held the post from 1758 to 1765, the date upon which he relinquished the editorship is uncertain.

It is only possible to record with accuracy those editors of the book from the modern period. The following list shows which volumes were produced by specific editors.

- M. Epstein (1922–1945)
- H.T. Montague Bell (1946)
- Ivison S. Macadam (1947–1972)
- Harry Hodson (1973–1987)
- Alan J. Day (1988–1999)
- D.S. Lewis (2000–2009)
- D.S. Lewis & Wendy Slater (2010–present)

== The Annual Register today ==
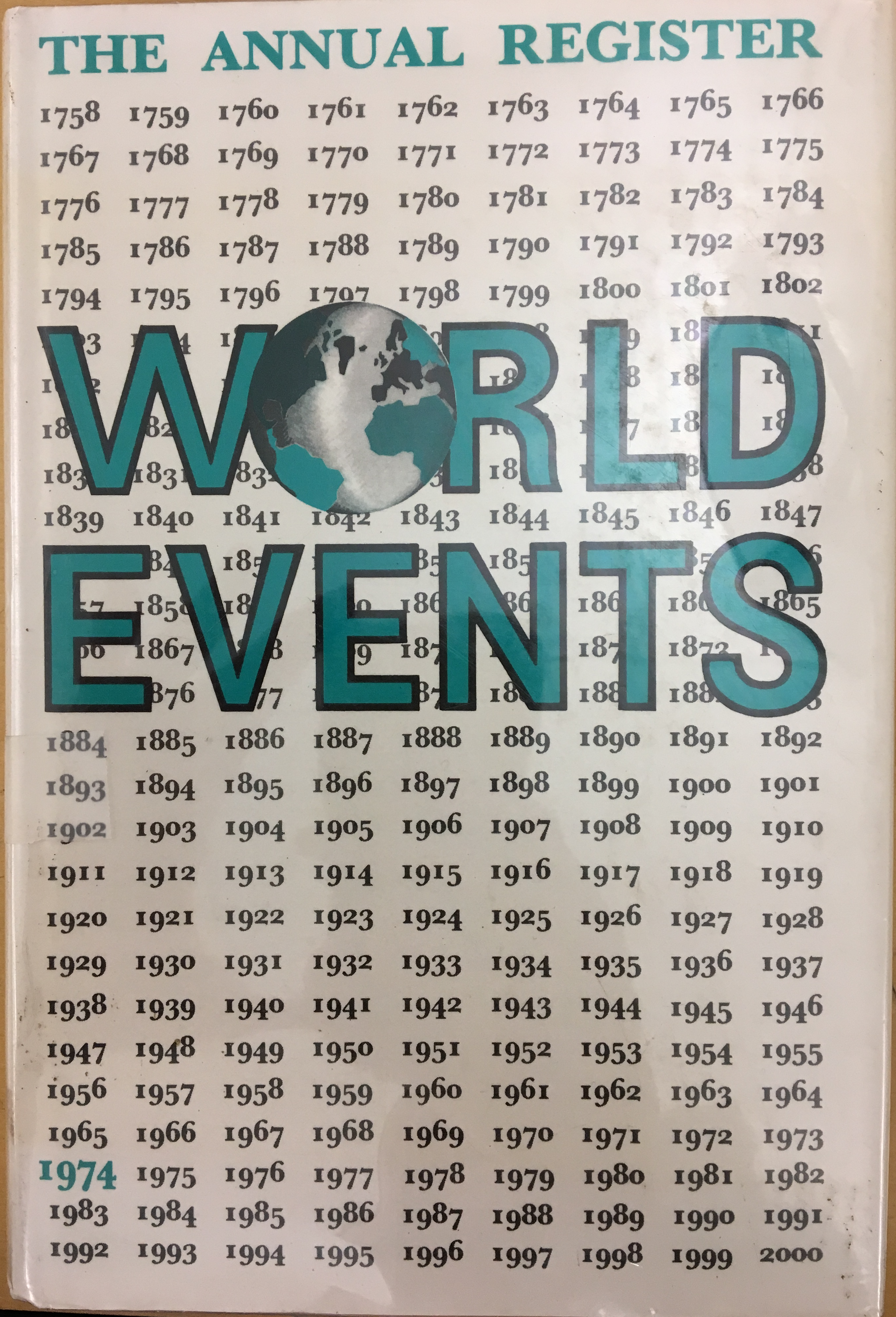
Cover of The Annual Register of 1974

=== Editorial aims ===
The Annual Register in its current form aims to provide an authoritative, accurate, and interesting summary of the history of the year. This includes charting the immediate history of individual countries and also covering developments across a broad spectrum of science and the humanities. It aims to maintain The Annual Register's traditional role as a well-respected reference work, while also providing an interesting and lively read.

=== Modern format ===
The Annual Register begins with an overview of the year, a thought-provoking essay by an established modern historian. In recent years, the authors of this article have included Paul Rogers, Anatol Lieven, Philip M.H. Bell, M.R.D. Foot, Richard Overy, and J.M. Roberts. There then follow articles on each country (or group of countries) in the world, ranging from a few hundred to 10,000 words in length. The second half of the book contains articles on major international and regional organisations, and essays on various topics. These include developments in the international economy, science and the environment, law and religion, and the arts and sport. The final sections of the book contain selected documents and statistics, an obituary section, and a day-by-day chronicle of the year's events. A number of maps and colour photographs are included to illustrate the year's key stories.

=== Contributors ===
Each article is written by an expert in that field. Of the ninety or so contributors, some of whom have written for The Annual Register for 40 years, the vast majority are academics or journalists. Although the contributors are scattered throughout the world, the publisher invites them to an annual dinner, which serves as a forum for discussion of the book, and at which a traditional toast "to the immortal memory of Edmund Burke" is still drunk in port, after the meal.

=== Advisory board members ===
The current advisory board of The Annual Register consists of the joint editors (D. S. Lewis and Wendy Slater), and the following luminaries, who are nominated by various learned societies.

- Chairman (June 2013-March 2025): Alastair Niven, LVO, OBE, Fellow, Harris Manchester College, University of Oxford (nominated by the British Council)
- Edward Fisher, MA, DM, FRCS (ORL), Consultant ear, nose and throat surgeon; Editor, Journal of Laryngology and Otology
- Richard O'Brien (nominated by the Royal Economic Society)
- David Reynolds, FBA, Professor of International History, University of Cambridge (nominated by the Royal Historical Society)
- Caroline Soper, Series editor, Insights (nominated by the Royal Institute of International Affairs)
- Lorelly Wilson, FRSC, MBE, Hon. Professor Promoting Science & Engineering, Liverpool John Moores University, (nominated by the British Science Association)

The annual board meetings are also attended by representatives of the publisher.

=== Current editors ===
D. S. Lewis studied history and economics at Manchester University, and took his PhD there in 1983. In 1987 he published Illusions of Grandeur: Mosley, Fascism and British Society (MUP), and from 1997 to 2007 he served as editor of Keesing's Record of World Events. He became chairman of the Advisory Board of The Annual Register in 1999 but stepped down in the following year upon becoming the book's editor.

Wendy Slater read Russian at the University of Cambridge and Soviet studies at Manchester. After several years in journalism she obtained her PhD from Cambridge in 1998, and from 1999 to 2003 was lecturer in Russian contemporary history at the UCL School of Slavonic and East European Studies (SSEES), a post which she left after becoming deputy editor of The Annual Register in 2002. In 2007, she published The Many Deaths of Nicholas II: Relics, remains and the Romanovs (Routledge).

=== Current publisher ===
The Annual Register is currently published by ProQuest, part of Clarivate. The company (then called CSA) bought the title in late 2005 from Keesing's Worldwide.

=== Winner of 2008 reference award ===
In 2008 the board of judges of the Specialized Information Publishers Association (SIPA) awarded The Annual Register the 2008 Best Reference Publication prize for its "editorial excellence".

=== Online archive ===
The entire archive of The Annual Register is currently available to subscribers online. This includes every volume published since 1758 and is updated annually when each new volume is completed. Each page has been scanned. Text has been captured through OCR (optical character recognition) for the earlier volumes, while recent volumes have text taken directly from the files used for the print publication. The online version includes contents tables and indexes to enable users to browse individual volumes. It also allows for keyword searches within the whole text.

== The Annual Register Edmund Burke Lectures ==
Since 2011, the publisher has hosted a yearly lecture by a person eminent in one of the fields covered by The Annual Register. The lecture is delivered before an invited audience, at the London headquarters of one of the institutions that nominate members of the Advisory Board. With the Covid pandemic, the Edmund Burke lectures moved online, and since 2022 they have been given as part of the Association of College & Research Libraries (ACRL) 'Choice' webinar series, with recordings made available also via ProQuest

=== The Edmund Burke lecturers 2011–2024 ===
- October 2011: Eugene Rogan, Professor of Modern Middle Eastern History, University of Oxford.
  - "After 2011: The New Middle East" (Chatham House)
- June 2013: Paul Rogers, Professor of Peace Studies, Bradford University.
  - "The Limits of Foreign Military Intervention" (the British Academy)
- June 2014: Jeremy Farrar, Director, the Wellcome Trust.
  - "Global Health: Challenges and Opportunities" (the Royal Society of Medicine)
- September 2015: Sir Paul Nurse, Chief Executive and Director, the Francis Crick Institute.
  - "Trust in Science" (the Royal Society)
- October 2016: Sir Ciarán Devane, Chief Executive, the British Council.
  - "Reflections on the Revolution in Britain: Brexit, Identity, and the United Kingdom's Place in the World" (the British Council)
- October 2017: David Reynolds (historian), Professor of International History, University of Cambridge.
  - "Reflections on the Revolutions in Russia, 1917–2017" (Chatham House)
- November 2018: Lola Young, Baroness Young of Hornsey.
  - "Re-imagining the Future: Social and Environmental Justice and Cultural Diversity" (the English Speaking Union)
- October 2019: Sir Simon Wessely, Regius Professor of Psychiatry at King's College, London, and the Maudsley Hospital
  - "The French Have a Word for It: Reflections on the Crisis in Student Mental Health" (the Royal Society of Medicine)
- September 2020: Hamish McRae, principal economic commentator for The Independent.
  - "The Future of the World Economy after the COVID crisis"—delivered as a webinar
- November 2021: Jamie Shea, Deputy Assistant Secretary General at NATO until 2018.
  - "NATO Can Provide Collective Defence, but Can It Secure a Liberal International Order as Well?"—delivered as a webinar
- November 2022: Michael Clarke (academic), Director of Royal United Services Institute 2007–2015.
  - "The War in Ukraine and Its Lasting Impact on Future Generations: Welcome to the Real 21st-Century"-delivered as a webinar
- October 2023: Richard Ovenden, Director of Bodleian Libraries at the University of Oxford.
  - "Remember, Remember: Libraries, Archives and the Social Importance of Preserving Knowledge"-delivered as a webinar
- November 2024: Dame Wendy Hall, Director of the Web Science Institute at the University of Southampton
  - "The Geopolitics of the Internet and Its Implications for the Governance of AI"-delivered as a webinar

== See also ==
- New Annual Register
- The Statesman's Yearbook
