= Sarah Ward (theatre manager) =

Scottish stage actress and theatre manager

Sarah Ward (1726 - 1771), was a Scottish stage actress and theatre manager. She was the first woman to have been active as a theatre manager in Edinburgh. She should not be confused with Sarah Ward (c.1756 - 1838), an English actress also active during the eighteenth century.

Ward was born to the English actor Thomas Achurch. She began her acting career in York and married actor and playwright Henry Ward. The couple was active in Thomas Este's company at the Taylor Hall in Edinburgh in 1745. After Este's death, the company split in two, the group of players led by Sarah Ward moving to the Canongate Concert Hall in 1747.

In 1748, Ward debuted in London, and then toured England and Scotland in various companies, often returning to Edinburgh. Between 1755 and 1758, she was active in Edinburgh theatre with her lover West Digges, and was a celebrated artist in Scotland: her most popular role was reportedly that of Lady Randolph in John Home's Douglas. In 1758, she left Scotland, and after one season in Dublin, she was active at the Covent Garden Theatre in London.

== Selected roles ==
- Valeria in The Roman Father by William Whitehead (1750)
- Lady Autumn in The Sister by Charlotte Lennox (1769)
