= Gauthier de Costes, seigneur de la Calprenède =

French novelist and dramatist

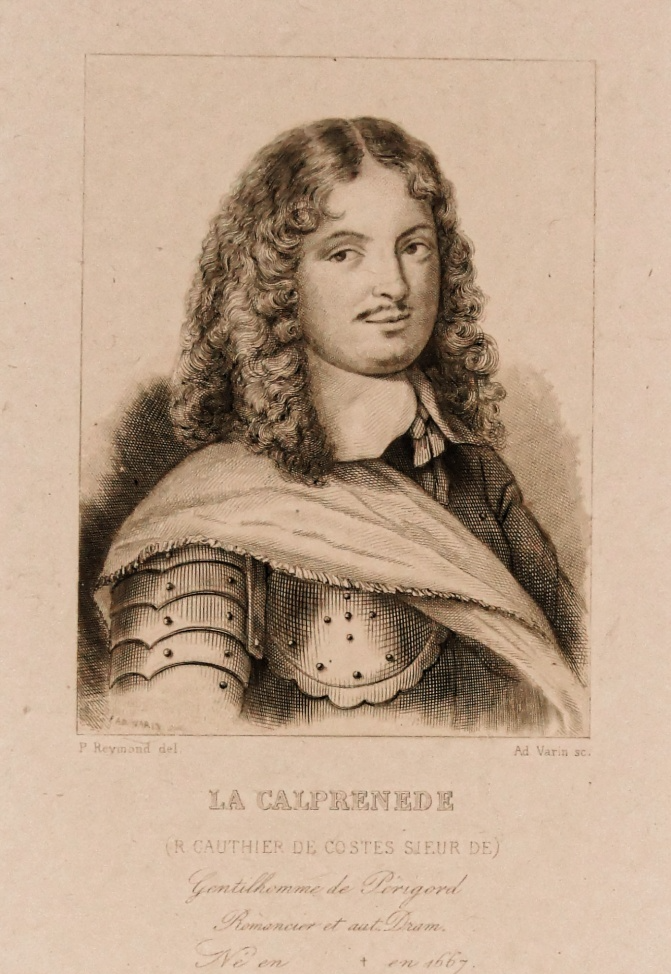

Gauthier de Costes, seigneur de la Calprenède (1609 or 1610 – 1663) was a French novelist and dramatist. He was born at the Château of Tolgou in Salignac-Eyvigues then within Guyenne. After studying at Toulouse, he came to Paris and entered the regiment of the guards, becoming in 1650 gentleman-in-ordinary of the royal household. He died in 1663 in consequence of a kick from his horse.

La Calprenède wrote several long heroic romances that were later ridiculed by Boileau, and most of them were also referenced in Charlotte Lennox's The Female Quixote. They are: Cassandre (5 vols., 1642–1650); Cléopâtre (1648); Faramond (1661); and Les Nouvelles, ou les Divertissements de la princesse Alcidiane (1661) published under his wife's name, but generally attributed to him. His Le Comte d'Essex, produced in 1638, supplied some ideas to Thomas Corneille for his tragedy of the same name.

== Works online ==
- Édouard, 1640
- Phalante, 1642
- Herménigilde, 1643
- Jeanne, reyne d’Angleterre, 1638
- La Bradamante, 1637
- La Mort de Mitridate, 1637
- La Mort des enfants d’Hérodes, ou Suite de Mariane, 1639
- Le Clarionte, ou le Sacrifice sanglant, 1637
- Le Comte d’Essex, 1638
