= The Sister (play) =

1769 comedy play

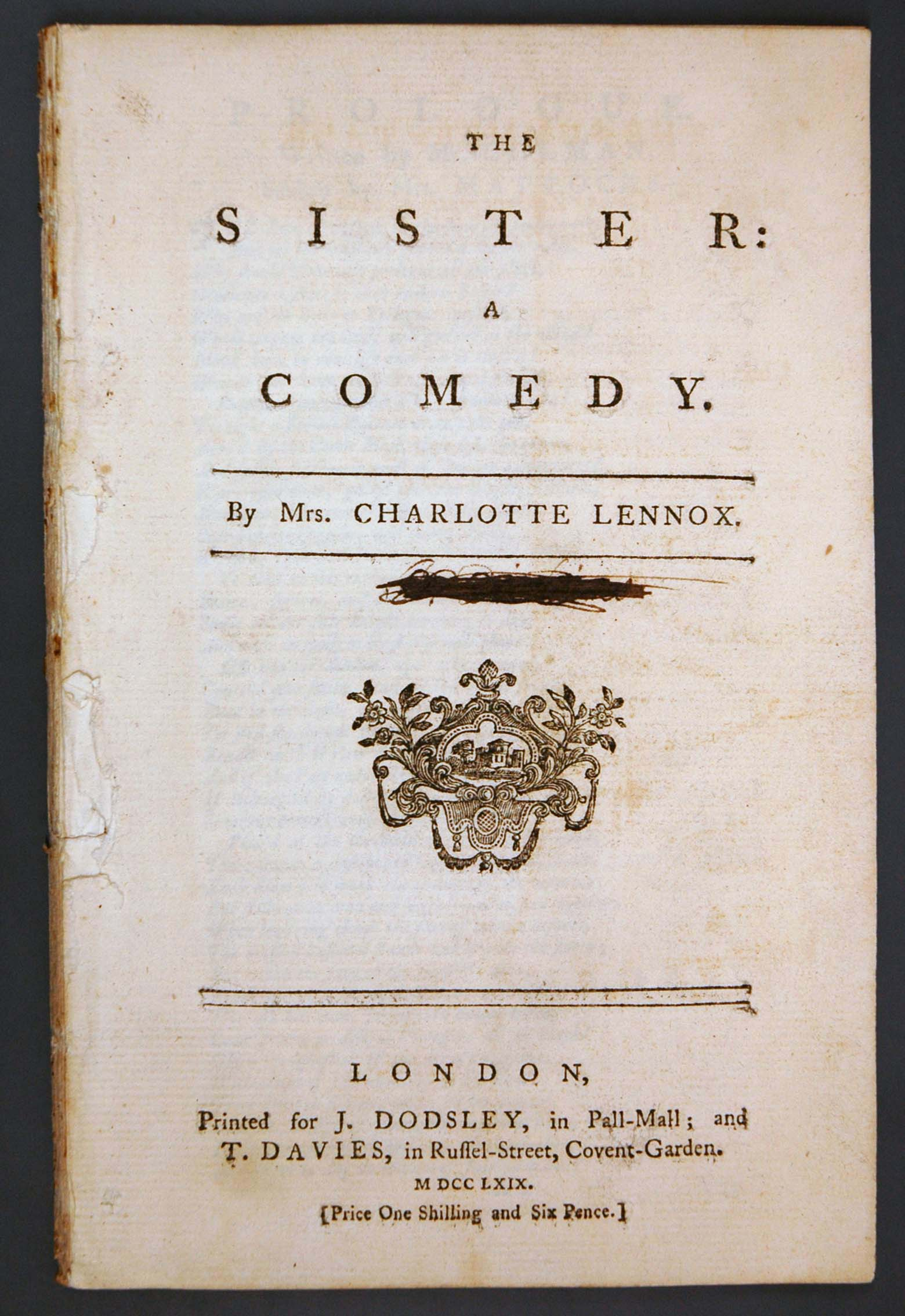
- Original language: English
- Written by: Charlotte Lennox
- Genre: Comedy

Premiere
- Date: 18 February 1769
- Place: Covent Garden Theatre, London

The Sister is a 1769 comedy play by the British writer Charlotte Lennox. Premiering at the Covent Garden Theatre, it was based on Lennox's own 1758 novel Henrietta. The original Covent Garden cast included William Powell as Courtney, William Smith as Lord Clairville, Mary Bulkley as Miss Autumn, Sarah Ward as Lady Autumn and John Cushing as Will. However the play was received by a hostile, organised element of the crowd and was withdrawn after one night.

== Bibliography ==
- Baines, Paul & Ferarro, Julian & Rogers, Pat. The Wiley-Blackwell Encyclopedia of Eighteenth-Century Writers and Writing, 1660-1789. Wiley-Blackwell, 2011.
- Carlile, Susan. Charlotte Lennox: An Independent Mind. University of Toronto Press, 2018.
