= Henrietta (novel) =

Book by Charlotte Lennox

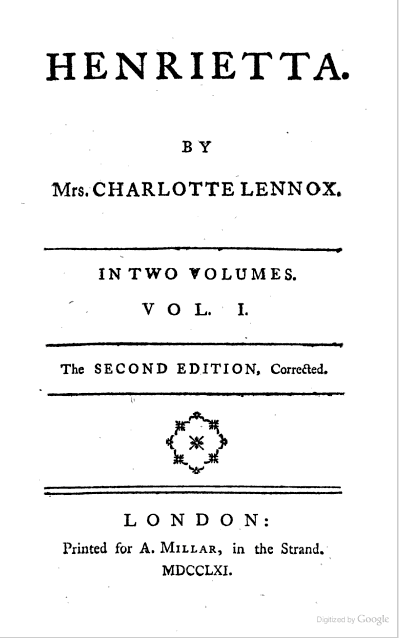
- Author: Charlotte Lennox
- Language: English
- Genre: Novel
- Publication place: United Kingdom

Henrietta is an 18th-century novel by Scottish author Charlotte Lennox. The first edition was published in 1758, and the second edition, revised by Lennox was published in 1761.

It was adapted by Lennox into a 1769 play The Sister, performed at Covent Garden Theatre.

== Overview ==
Charlotte Lennox's novel Henrietta depicts the difficulties and dangers faced by young, unprotected women in the eighteenth century. Throughout the story, Lennox uses Henrietta, the protagonist, to describe problems women faced having to do with men, money and social value in the 18th century. Henrietta struggles to figure out her role in society, and, through a series of events, she finds herself overwhelmed with what society has to offer her. Lennox creates tension and elements of suspense throughout the story.

The novel fundamentally uses an idea of romance and relationships, along with independence, to build characters and the plot. In the beginning, Lennox tells us Henrietta leaves the comfort of her aunts because they want her to have an arranged marriage and she wants to marry for love. Her pitfalls and successes give Henrietta likability and show how her character is relatable to others. Henrietta is the heroine and the reader wants her to succeed and find true love.

Henrietta can be categorized under the German genre known as Bildungsroman. The book focuses on its heroine's steadfast moral beliefs, while also showing her growth as she develops a new sense of self through her many experiences. Henrietta is also known as a comedy of manners because the satirical depiction of other characters throughout the novel teach Henrietta eighteenth-century social norms.

== Author ==
Charlotte Ramsay Lennox was born in 1729 in Gibraltar. She initially set out to become an actress, but began to write literature after that proved unsuccessful. In 1747 she married Alexander Lennox, an employee of the printer William Strahan, but their marriage ended within about ten years. Charlotte and Alexander had two children, a boy born in 1771 and a girl born in 1765.

Lennox published a poem in 1747, called "Several Occasions". She is also known for composing the first comparative critical study of William Shakespeare's source material, Shakespear Illustrated between 1753 and 1754. Some other popular novels Lennox wrote are The Life of Harriot Stuart (1751), and The Female Quixote (1752).

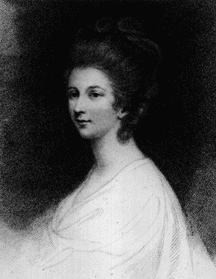
Charlotte Ramsay Lennox, author and poet 1729/30-1804

Charlotte Lennox - "As my readers depend on it, I will always be as witty as I can, as humorous as I can, as moral as I can, and upon the whole entertaining as I can." - The Lady's Museum

Lennox is also known for a controversial poem that was published in Gentlemen's Magazine, titled "The Art of Coquetry", in which she directed young to "Employ feminine wiles in order to subdue men to their 'empire'", promising that such women will "control the world by love."

== Plot summary ==
VOLUME I

Pretty and genteelly dressed, the main character, Henrietta Courteney, acquires a seat in the already full stage-coach to London. Henrietta keeps to herself at first but towards the end of the ride comes in contact with Miss Woodby. In tradition of romance heroines, Ms. Woodby gives Henrietta and herself nicknames, Celia and Celinda, and declared a “violent friendship” (Lennox, 9). Arriving at Ms. Woodby's stop, Henrietta asks for help to find an appropriate lodging, so that her friend gives Henrietta a letter of recommendation for Mrs. Egret, a milliner friend. Unfortunately, Henrietta does not have the address and thus misguides to another milliner's house of Mrs. Eccles. Mrs. Eccles takes Henrietta in once realizing that she seems lost. Henrietta sends Ms. Woodby a letter because she realizes she does not want to spend any more time at this place. During the time that Henrietta is in Mrs. Eccles's home, a gentleman becomes interested in Henrietta and Mrs. Eccles seems to encourage the potential relationship. Henrietta is pleased but doesn’t look into it much. Miss Woodby comes over for tea. Then, they begin to talk about the misfortune of ending up at Mrs. Eccles’ home and Henrietta starts to tell her backstory: about her deceased unmarried parents, her brother being away for school, and her life at her aunt's.

Henrietta leaves Mrs. Eccles’ house, and finds accommodation at Lady Manning's. Henrietta trusts her, but Lady Manning is only housing Henrietta to set her up with Mr. Jones. We then begin reading about Henrietta being flirted with once again. With this we learn the man's name is Mr. Damer, who is a known merchant in the city, but also a liar. We learn he is a liar when he introduces Henrietta under the false name of Benson, rather than her real name of Courtney. This man gives Henrietta money and tries to persuade her into a relationship with him, which she is not fond of. Mrs. Damer finds out and she questions her husband who blames Henrietta. As a result, Henrietta receives the name of an adulteress, which shames her and leaves her without money. Also, she receives a letter from her aunt telling her that she is ashamed of Henrietta and thus can no longer consider Henrietta a niece, and that she can no longer live with her. Henrietta then approaches Mrs. Willis for advice about her letter back to Lady Meadows. Along with this, she asks Mrs. Willis for help to find her a job as well as new place to stay. Thus, Henrietta works and lives with Mrs. Cordwain. However, this is short lived as Mr. Cordwain believes that she had stolen his daughter's diamond bracelet.

VOLUME II

As a result of her conflicts with Woodby and young Mr. Damer, Henrietta feels betrayed and angry towards those who have tried to take advantage of her. Henrietta tries to return to her aunt, Lady Meadows, however she sends Henrietta a letter stating that her fortune will not be restored to her unless she goes to a convent or marries a Catholic. Henrietta then writes a letter back to her aunt, stating that only time will reveal the truth about what had happened. She then goes to Mrs. Willis for guidance and to help her find a job in service. Mrs. Willis helps her become employed by Miss Cordwain, a young lady who is spoiled and struggling to find a suitable husband. She was intended to marry a noble man but her father was short on her dowry and thus the engagement was broken off and she is still searching for a husband.

After Henrietta is employed, she accompanies Miss Cordwain to the home of Lord B—. Lord B— and Henrietta have met previously at Mrs. Eccles. He immediately takes an interest in Henrietta, trying to talk to her and expressing his feelings. Henrietta knowing that any interaction with Lord B— would be inappropriate as she is a servant, and the fact that Lord B— is a possible suitor for Miss Cordwain. He questions why a well-born girl such as Henrietta is now a servant girl. Miss Cordwain sees them talking and she becomes jealous. Miss Cordwain hides one of her diamond bracelets in order to place the blame on Henrietta. Henrietta then becomes friends with Lord B—’s mother the countess. She confides in the countess and tells her that the immediately terminated her employment knowing that Lord B— is a suitor for Miss Cordwain. She then leaves the employment of Miss Cordwain and leaves for London. Lord B— is conflicted with his feelings for Henrietta as he confesses that he is in love with her but she lacks the fortune that Miss Cordwain can offer.

After leaving the employment of Miss Cordwain, she returns to Miss Willis looking for another place of employment. She then goes to the Countess's sister Lady D--, who recommends Henrietta to work for a woman named to Mrs. Autumn. Mrs. Autumn is a woman in her 40s and 50s who is very immature for her age. It is soon discovered Mrs. Autumn has a lover named Languish, who she uses in hopes to make her husband, Mr. Autumn, Jealous. However the existence of Languish is neither confirmed or denied. Mrs. Autumn wants to employ young girl like Henrietta to entertain her girlish fantasies. However, Henrietta finds that she cannot flatter Mrs. Autumn's schemes as she finds her actions ridiculous and childish. Mrs. Autumn asks Henrietta to copy a letter to Languish to test his loyalty, since the letter will be written in another woman's hand. However, Henrietta refuses this task due to the fact that Mrs. Autumn is married and does not want to be a part of her adulterous schemes. Due to this, she leaves the employment of Mrs. Autumn.

After leaving the employment of Mrs. Autumn, Henrietta then returns to Mrs. Willis. She is also visited by Lord B—, who again professes his love for her. Lord B--’s father the Earl also comes to Henrietta to discusses her potential of marrying Lord B— given that she has a fortune. In order to marry his son, he wants Henrietta to pretend she is Catholic, so she can become Lady Meadows heir again. As a result, Lord B— will marry her and she will have her fortune and his title. He suggests that she remain Protestant at heart but in public proclaim she is Catholic. She refuses his offer, as she will not compromise her religion for a man she will never love. Lord B— suggests to her that she only pretend until she receive her fortune. Lord B-- being a man concerned about appearance, wants Henrietta to appear as a martyr.

She then meets a woman named Miss Belmore, who is the daughter of Lady D—. She then becomes Miss Belmore's servant. It is discovered that Miss Belmore is having an affair with a man named Mr. Morely. Mr. Morely is a married man, however Miss Belmore is convinced that he is in a loveless marriage, so she is his lover. Henrietta does not approve of her choices, but she is paid to be her companion and advisor. Belmore wants to set up a meeting with Morely and announces her intentions to leave for Paris. Belmore wants to write to him, but Henrietta suggest she first leaves for Paris and write Morely then.

On their way to Paris, we are introduced to two new characters, Freeman and Marquis Melvil. Melvil is the son of a Duke and Freeman is his companion. The pair is returning to London from Paris until Melvil sees Henrietta and immediately falls for her. Melvil then convinces Freeman to divert their journey, so they can escort Belmore and Henrietta to Paris. Freeman reluctantly agrees but seeing Melvil's interest in Henrietta, allows for the extension to their journey.

Knowing that Henrietta and Miss Belmore are traveling with no chaperone, that Miss Belmore is a woman of loose morals, therefore Freeman sees the potential of Henrietta becoming a mistress to his master. Freeman then goes to Henrietta to suggest that she becomes a mistress to Melvil. Freeman suggest this type of relationship since Melvil has feelings for her and he cannot marry her due to status.

However, as Freeman is about to speak to Henrietta, Henrietta receives a letter from Mr. Damer. Although Henrietta has been going by the alias of Miss Benson the letter is addressed to Miss Courtney. In this moment, we discover that Freeman is Charles Courtney, Henrietta's brother. He is then happily reunited with his sister, and immediately asks Henrietta to leave the employment of Miss Belmore. Freeman also asks for Henrietta to stay at a convent until he makes arrangement for them to return home. Henrietta agrees to this, and is taken to a convent while Freeman returns to Melvil. Freeman reveals to Melvil that Henrietta is sister. Melvil is overjoyed in knowing that his friend is the brother of the woman he loves. However, Freeman does not give Melvil his blessing to marry Henrietta until Melvil has the Duke's blessing. Freeman's concern is that the Duke will not approve of the match as Henrietta is of a lower status than Mevil. Freeman does not want Melvil to be disinherited by the Duke therefore repeating the mistakes and struggles of their parents. To resolve this issue, they return to Lady Meadows. Henrietta acquires a 10,000 pound dowry.

In order to resolve the marriage issue they return to Lady Meadows with Freeman plans to give her 10,000 pounds for her dowry. Mr. Courtney finds out that Lady Meadow leaves everything to Mr. Courtney in her will. However, the dowry the Duke expects is 20,000 pounds which is double the amount Lady Meadows has to offer. Freeman convinces Lady Meadows that the title and status Henrietta will receive is incentive enough to pay the dowry set by the Duke. Lady Meadows agrees with Freeman's suggestion, but the dowry set is too high. Luckily Mr. Damer, helps contribute 10,000 pounds to her dowry. The first 10,000 goes the day of her wedding, and the other 10,000 the day of her aunt's death. Henrietta is able to marry Lord Melvil, and at their wedding ceremony, all that characters in the novel make an appearance. After receiving letter from Mr.Courtney, Melvil presents the letter to the Duke and asks for his blessing. As the Duke read the letter he plans to meet with Lady Meadow and Mr. Damer as well as Henrietta. Being Catholic, Lady meadows allowed the wedding to take place at her house, which after the newly married couple, the old lady, the Duke, Mr. Courtney, and Mr. Damer went out for Grace's country seat. Unfortunately after a few short months after the wedding, Lady Meadows passed which gave Mr. Courtney great joy because her death released his obligations to Mr. Damer.

== Style ==
Henrietta is broken up into two volumes. Volume I contains two books with a total of 25 chapters and volume II contains three books and a total of 30 chapters. Lennox includes a brief and witty description of each chapter as a title of sorts, such as "a very short chapter" in chapter IX of book two, or a chapter VI "in which our heroine again appears very foolish." This style of opening chapters was characteristic of Henry Fielding in the early 18th century.

Each book focuses on a specific part of Henrietta's life. In book one, Lennox focuses on Henrietta and her interactions with Mrs. Woodby, along with Henrietta telling her backstory. Book two focuses on Henrietta's life while living with Mrs. Eccles and several characters trying to use Henrietta for her money or her name. Book three starts off the second volume, and describes how Henrietta branches out and finds a job working for Mrs. Cordwain. In the fourth book, Henrietta leaves Mrs. Cordwain because she is getting jealous of Henrietta, and then goes to work for Mrs. Autumn. To wrap the story up, in the fifth book, Henrietta accompanies Lady Belmour to London and meets her brother, Freeman, and her love, Melvil.

The novel is narrated in the third person. The narrator describes Henrietta throughout the story to give the reader more insight about what is going on in her life. Throughout the story, the narrator makes humorous and witty remarks about Henrietta and the situations she is in. While for most of the novel the narrator focuses on telling Henrietta's story, when Freeman is introduced in the story, the focus of the narrator shifts to his movements and actions. The author gave context and social cues at the time that added towards the situations in which Henrietta was faced with. For instance, when Henrietta was living by herself, this event highlights the severity of this issue on the fact that living alone today would be much more female friendly now than in time in which the story was written.

== Critical Contexts ==
Charlotte Lennox’s Henrietta offers a criticism of women and their roles in the 18th century. In a time where women were bargaining chips and their marriages brought needed funds to respectable names of the noble class, women were encouraged to agree to engagements that either brought money or titles. Criticizing the snobbery that occurred between noble names and “upstart cits” who were successful in business, Lennox offers a blank straight character in the titular character Henrietta, who's equal parts pious and respectable, while the characters surrounding her are caricatures of the roles played at the time: Miss Cordwain, for instance, is a haughty woman with little name but due to her father's successful business ventures is able to marry into a respectable family, though her attitude and behavior would be disgraceful if the dowry her father offered wasn’t so desirable. Miss Belmour is from a respectable family but dishonors her name by engaging in a romance with an already married man. These women are stark contrast to the virtuous Henrietta, who refuses to marry someone with a title, like Sir Isaac Darby, for the sake of becoming a titled woman, if there is no love or respect between them, an ideal that is a novelty among the upper echelon surrounding Henrietta.

The concept of religion becomes an important part of Henrietta's story, as her aunt Lady Meadows is adamant about her heir keeping the Catholic faith. Catholicism in England at the time was more of a novelty religion, laughed at by Protestants and considered a rarity. In order to become Lady Meadows’ heir, Henrietta must convert, or, as Lord B- suggests, maintain an appearance of Catholic piety to appease her aunt long enough to become her sole or major heir. Henrietta ends up being put in a convent by her brother while he goes off and sorts her life out for her. She happily stays there waiting for him to call for her.

Henrietta offers an unusual view of women in 18th century literature, her wit and common sense are a refreshing aspect of a woman traveling alone, or without counsel. Women of her time had a tendency to be viewed in a way that made it necessary for them to be given permission from either their fathers, or husbands, or male ‘superiors’ to do anything. Henrietta denounces the marriage her aunt had set for her, leading her to embark upon an adventure that leaves her relatively penniless, and alone. She knows she has a brother out in the world, but is unsure as to when she will see him. Her decision to go against the family she has, and go out on her own shows a sense of independence not typically seen amongst 18th century female characters.

Lennox encapsulates many of the time period's social nuances in a way that probes the reader to think more deeply about how limited women's capabilities appear to be. Henrietta is a poised individual, yet fairly naïve, and her independence repeatedly places her in positions of vulnerability, both physically and in the social sphere. In an attempt to make her actions less conspicuous, she utilizes several aliases, however is unable to successfully conceal her identity, which only serves to further compound her shame. Despite her efforts to conform to the behavior expected of women, her resistance to having others dictate her marital status is her most prominent recurring problem. Each time a conflict arises, Henrietta chooses to flee rather than confront it, and only when she reunites with her brother does she cease to flee, instead opting to put him in control of her every decision. While Henrietta's behavior throughout the novel initially seems benign, women's etiquette in the 18th century had many intricate and at times paradoxical rules; although she was not as boisterous as some other women she encountered, her steadfast personal morals made her enemies nearly everywhere she went. That said, Henrietta is a realistic, relatable portrayal of a woman who wants to be considered dignified, but also wants to retain her own personal morals, and struggles to maintain balance between the two.

Henrietta is an independent woman that is getting around mostly on her own, despite growing up in a sheltered life where she did not have much to worry about. She is able to observe everything around her, and infer what a woman's role in society is and what is expected of her. Henrietta is concerned about the idea of having to 'marry a man' and does not want to be forced into something she does not want to do. This should not be confused with not wanting to be married at all, throughout the book she is never insinuating she does not want to marry period, but that she does not want to be forced into something she has not chosen. This is an important distinction since almost all women of status were 'forced' into a marriage, whether they were happy about it or not. It was not their choice based on love, it was a usually a choice made by a father or older brother in order to further advance their family, or business.

Henrietta is a work of domestic fiction, providing an outline for what is expected within the social realms of its contemporary society. Despite being a novel, it serves as a practical manual for English middle class readers. For example, Book I of Henrietta, which recounts the protagonist's familial trials and somewhat complicated standing within the class hierarchy, demonstrates the struggle of intermingling between classes. Writer and literary scholar Elizabeth Langland argues that given the historical context of these works, a successful romance between a working class woman and a middle-class man is “un narratable.” Such seemingly unbreachable social boundaries are abundant in Lennox's text. There appear to be immediately dismissed by the character's morality, cautioning against them. Henrietta's odd circumstances (being financially frozen, wandering from place to place with no home, yet remaining esteemed as a respectable elite) place her ideally to act as a conduit through which the reader can observe the rigid class divide of England and be instructed how to navigate it.

The history of Henrietta's parent's marriage-for-love scandal is a perfect example of the 18th century British obsession with maintaining its cultural hierarchy. Early on, Henrietta explains her father's (Mr. Courtney's) station as elite – being son to an earl – while her mother embodies “birth, beauty, virtue, [and] every perfection but riches.” By choosing to marry the woman he loves from a lower social standing, Mr. Courtney condemns his family to economic struggle, as opposed to the prosperity he could have given them if the earl had not “renounced him” as a son. Even the support Mr. Courtney's mother, the countess, had for him could not change what society had deemed irreparable to his character. “Unequal” matches were perceived to create chaos and consequently figured in domestic novels as one of the paramount examples of poor conduct taught through cautionary tales; one learned how they ought to behave by being shown how not to behave.

Another concept frequently addressed in the domestic novel, and specifically in Henrietta, is duty to family, both older, whose legacy one was to carry, and younger, whom one was to support and endow with what fortune and respect they could. The choice that Henrietta's father makes in marrying a woman of lower social standing and sentencing them both to a pauper's life is portrayed as a failure to his family for which Henrietta continues to suffer on his behalf. Hers is a complicated circumstance: a noble last name gives her some social agency, yet the economic misfortune of a lower class mother restricts her and in some cases defines her. Lady Meadows, too, represents a failing here: Henrietta brings dishonor to her aunt which results in their being estranged. While the consequences of Henrietta's choices are often more swift and exacting than those in a real life situation, the progression of cause and effect instructs that every action has a righteous result, and that good and bad behavior are both rewarded in kind.

== Themes ==
=== Family honor ===
One theme of the novel is the importance of family honor and class. for example, Lady Manning's values of family reputation and pride. She accepts Henrietta as one of her own because of her thirst for power and rank. Her goal from the start is to marry Henrietta off to a person of lower rank, a steward, so that she can advance in ranking and obtain more power among her family. Lady Meadows attempts to marry off Henrietta to Sir Isaac Darby because of his class. In the third book, Lady Meadow worries that Henrietta's actions will taint their family reputation, so she disowns her. She values the family's reputation more, and anybody affecting its title would not be recognized. Again and again, characters either pursue the marriage of Henrietta or wish to regulate her decisions. Henrietta successfully evades many of these hurdles by holding to her virtues and values.

=== Independence ===
Independence has made the best out of Henrietta's life compared to how other women would view living by themselves. She reacts to living alone quite well. Even though she gets emotional about this, Henrietta is known for using her virtues of compassion, honesty and humbleness into her day to day situation. An example would be when a man in a chariot offers Henrietta his seat. She gracefully rejects his proposition at first since she would not want to impose. Henrietta's parents were not around and able to support her, much like single women at the time were used to.

The novel also portrays a harsh view of females, that make them seem dependent on men. Charlotte Lennox removes women's independence and depicts several female characters as romantic (Ms. Woodby), dramatic (Lady Manning), jealous (Mrs. Damer), conniving (Ms. Cordwain), and easily charmed (Ms. Belmont) by male voices. There are only a few women in Henrietta that are not flawed with feminine traits of romantic novels. Women's imprudent actions in the story create a situation that can only be corrected with male assistance.

=== Bildungsroman ===
The Bildungsroman tradition is carried though the century with the help of this novel. Henrietta spends a lot of time throughout the story observing her environment and learning what a woman's role in society consists of, as well as how the role of money plays a part in such a society. Several times she is put in difficult situations where she has to choose between her morality or something that goes against what she believes in. For example, she constantly is in "fear of being forced to marry a man" she dislikes, and several characters throughout the story try to get her to do this. She always chooses her morality over something she believes to be immoral or unethical. This shows that she is very aware of her principles which she develops as she gains more experiences in society. Due to her stubbornness and unyielding beliefs, Henrietta contrasts heavily with her female counterparts who are willing to bend for the sake of their family, reputation, or progress in marriage opportunities. Many of Henrietta's contemporaries are solely focused on marriage, whereas she from the start has been avoiding this.

=== Comedy of manners ===
Henrietta is a "comedy of manners", valuing the appearance characters portray in a social class, and manners consisting of lust, greed, and self-interested cynicism. This is displayed in Miss Woodby's love life, how she is falling in love so fast. On the other hand, Miss Woodby marries a young "red coat" a week after meeting each other, just so the man does not kill himself. Lennox tells the reader how Henrietta advances from one guardian to the next, such as from Lady Manning to the protection of Lady Meadows. Lady Meadows cherishes the name of the family, and will not let Henrietta's actions defile their families' reputation. Lennox shows how Henrietta's behavior soon causes the development of her independent behavior.

== Characters ==
Henrietta Courteney: Henrietta Courteney is the novel's main character that is a young, beautiful, naïve orphan having come from an aristocratic family, finds herself resisting the bonds of marriage despite the alternative until she meets Marquis Melvil in book four. Henrietta befriends a fellow character Miss. Woodby in book one that insist Henrietta writing to her under the pseudonym as Clelia. Throughout the novel Henrietta finds herself navigating through the twist and turns of being a young, beautiful and unwed women, in a world dictated by class, titles, and dowry. Ultimately Henrietta learns the ways of the world as she meets many different and ostentatious characters, all of which put her knowledge of the world to test in one form or another.

Parents: Henrietta's father (Mr. Courteney) is the youngest of three brothers and is most favored by his father. He is very well educated and taught his children French and Italian. Henrietta's mother (Mrs. Carlton) is knowledgeable and loves to write. Her parents are distant after Henrietta is born. They are known to have misfortune after her birth. Mr. Courteney's mother leaves him a small inheritance after her death. Unfortunately, Mr. Courteney soon passes away himself. Mrs. Carlton falls ill and leaves her children in the hands of guardians.

Grandparents: Grandfather is an earl. He is an honest man and follows orders.

Lady Manning: The first guardian who receives Henrietta upon the death of her mother. She has ulterior motives for this action, as family name and station were important to her, having Henrietta under her care help her station. She wanted Henrietta to marry her steward Mr. Jones, something of an insult to Henrietta and her aunt lady Meadows. Knowing that family name and titles are important to her it is important to acknowledge that Lady Manning received her title from her deceased husband. “Mr. Manning” obtained his title by paying for it: which is seen as the lowest and most dishonored way possible.

Lady Meadows: Henrietta's aunt comes across as a selfish, superficial woman who values fame and money like other high ranking social women. After witnessing the Henrietta's disrespect form Lady Manning she takes Henrietta in not because of selflessness, but because of pride. She is a strong Roman Catholic who is obsessed with her friend who is also Chaplain Danvers. Due to her jealousy of the relationship of Henrietta and Danvers, Lady Meadows decides to find her a suitor who was catholic, rich, and old, which gives Chaplain Danvers all to Lady Meadows. She wants Henrietta to marry sir Isaac Darby, who is old enough to be Henrietta's father. "My aunt indeed allowed that there was some disproportion in our years; but then he had a good estate, and I was wholly dependent upon her; his person, she acknowledged, was not very amiable, but he was a baronet, and could give me a title". She also wanted to convert her niece to Catechism. She was unsuccessful with both propositions, making her niece rebel against her and ran away from home.

Miss Woodby: Miss. Woodby is an older woman with more experience, and a deep love for the world of French amatory fiction of the time. Henrietta befriends Miss Woodby upon their first encounter in the coach. Miss. Woodby is enamored with having a “violent” friendship and insist Henrietta write to her by addressing her as Celinda. Miss. Woodby also attempts to assist in helping the young orphan Henrietta in finding a home, but accidentally gives the coachman the wrong address leading Henrietta to meet her next great encounter at Mrs. Eccles home. While Henrietta and Miss. Woodby correspond back and forth to one another it is not until later in book 2 where Miss. Woodby accidentally reveals Henrietta's life story, which Henrietta desired to keep secret.

Mrs. Eccles: Mrs. Eccles is an older women and a milliner who runs the lodge Henrietta finds herself in. While their first encounter bonded them over the mounds of literature Mrs. Eccels possessed, it is not until much further in the novel we find the lodge to be more than just a lodge. At one point Henrietta is warned that Mrs. Eccles is not the most savory of characters and neither is her lodge.

Mr. Damer: Henrietta's guardian is a genuine man who is there to protect Henrietta from the people who may be a threat to her. Henrietta's mother left him to care for Henrietta when she died. He treats Henrietta like she is his own daughter. He is absent for most of the novel, as he is traveling abroad.

Young Mr. Damer: Young Mr. Damer is the son of Mr. Damer who temporarily takes responsibility as Henrietta's guardian until his father Mr. Damer returns. The young Mr. Damer is eager and willing to help Henrietta in any way she requires it. The Young Mr. Damer ends up having feelings for Henrietta, which are not reciprocated. “It is no flattery, miss to tell you, that when I first saw you, I was charmed with your person and behavior…” pg 113

Lord B: the former fiancée of Miss Cordwain, who becomes fond of Henrietta, when she is employed at Miss. Cordwain's residence. Who later wants Henrietta to become catholic in order to obtain her fortune. This can be found on pages (184-185) Lord B can be loosely connected to a character in Pamela whose name is also Lord B

Mrs. Willis: a tenant who young Damer places Henrietta under. She becomes a close friend and confidant to Henrietta. Mrs. Willis turns into a sort of mother figure for Henrietta

Miss Cordwain: Miss Cordwain is the wealthy, vain and presumptuous wife of Lord B with the desire of appearing as a genteel. She becomes Henrietta's first employer but soon picks up on the affections her husband has for Henrietta fueling jealous suspicions. Miss Cordwin accuses Henrietta of stealing from her, which is debunked by the fact Henrietta was no longer working with Miss. Cordwain when the item went missing.

Mrs. Autumn: Makes her first appearance on page 174. She is a vain, eccentric, fashionable woman who employs Henrietta upon leaving Ms. Cordwain. She hires Henrietta also in the hopes of friendship. She is an older woman in her late 40s or early 50s who fashions herself in the manner of a much younger girl she does such by talking about her hatred of old people. One would not be able to guess her age due to the way she speaks. She desires to be complimented often and fancies herself to be envied by younger men. She tries to make her husband jealous with her lover who goes by the name Lanunshi. She fires Henrietta for not transcribing her love letter to her younger lover.

Countess D: Lord's B's mother, who refers Henrietta to Mrs. Autumn for employment.

Miss Belmour: Is the daughter of Lady D and the companion for Henrietta as she travels to London. She is also known for having inappropriate relations with a man. This can be found on pages 196-197

The Deities Women: Is a womea of independence “a female free thinker”. She doesn't have a moral center or cares for religion, in some aspects she is depicted as atheist. (Page,170-171)

Melvil: also known as the Marquis, who hopelessly falls in love with her at first sight. He would have her at whatever cost he may receive from his father, for he loves her hopelessly. He is notable because, through his falling in love with her, Henrietta's position is restored with her aunt. Melvil was Freeman's companion when he was traveling in London. Melvil turned out to be a marquis; he is infatuated with Henrietta and wants to marry her. When he tells this to Freeman, Freeman tells him to keep Henrietta as his mistress.

Freeman/Charles Courteney: Henrietta's younger brother, who went to London for school. He later becomes the companion of Melvil, a marquis, who falls in love with Henrietta. When he arrives home, he inherits half of Lady Meadow's fortune. He offers his sister money for her dowry.

The Earl: A man who believes religion is not necessarily, and he shows this when he's cares more about Henrietta's fortune then religious state

== Literary history ==
Henrietta displays Lennox's ideas of patience with religious and political differences. Henrietta models as a young woman teaching an older woman to open up her concrete view of the world. The novel's heroine displays a consistency with Jacobite ideology. The heroine shows a distrust of Catholicism and runs away when her aunt forces her to convert to Catholicism. Henrietta stands up for her beliefs in her religion and uses her patience and brother to change her aunt's view. Towards the end of the novel, Henrietta's aunt slowly accepts Henrietta's religious beliefs.
