= The Roman Father =

1750 play by William Whitehead

- Original language: English
- Written by: William Whitehead
- Genre: Tragedy

Premiere
- Date: 24 February 1750; 276 years ago
- Place: Theatre Royal, Drury Lane, London

The Roman Father is a 1750 tragedy by the British writer and future Poet Laureate William Whitehead. It is set during the reign of Tullus Hostilius, the legendary third King of Rome and his war with the neighbouring city of Alba Longa.

The original Drury Lane cast featured David Garrick as Horatius, Spranger Barry as Publius Horatius, John Sowdon as Tullius Hostilius, Thomas King as Valerius, Sarah Ward as Valeria and Hannah Pritchard as Horatia. Incidental music was composed by William Boyce. It was met with "extravagant applause" and ran for twelve performances that season. It was revived frequently at both Drury Lane and Covent Garden.

== Bibliography ==
- Baines, Paul & Ferarro, Julian & Rogers, Pat. The Wiley-Blackwell Encyclopedia of Eighteenth-Century Writers and Writing, 1660-1789. Wiley-Blackwell, 2011.
- Bartlett, Ian & Bruce, Robert J. William Boyce: A Tercentenary Sourcebook and Compendium. Cambridge Scholars Publishing, 2011
