= Lorelly Wilson =

British chemist and educator

Lorelly Wilson MBE
- Known for: Founding Chemistry with Cabbage
- Awards: Visiting Professor of the University of Chester; Honorary Fellow of the University of Manchester; Honorary Fellow of the British Science Association
- Scientific career
- Fields: Chemistry, Education
- Website: www.lorellywilson.co.uk

Lorelly Wilson is a British chemist, educator and founder of Chemistry with Cabbage, hands-on workshops to inspire students to study science. She is a Fellow of the Royal Society of Chemistry and was awarded an MBE in 2016 for services to education.

Wilson began her career at Imperial Chemical Industries before starting to work in education outreach, running workshops for schools and working with the Royal Society of Chemistry to develop educational resources for teachers. Chair of the British Science Association's North West branch, Wilson runs SciBar events across the region, inviting experts to pubs and bars to bring science to the general public.

In her spare time Wilson plays the viola and is the editor for a talking newspaper for people who are blind or partially sighted.
