= Robert Dodsley =

English publisher and writer (1703–1764)

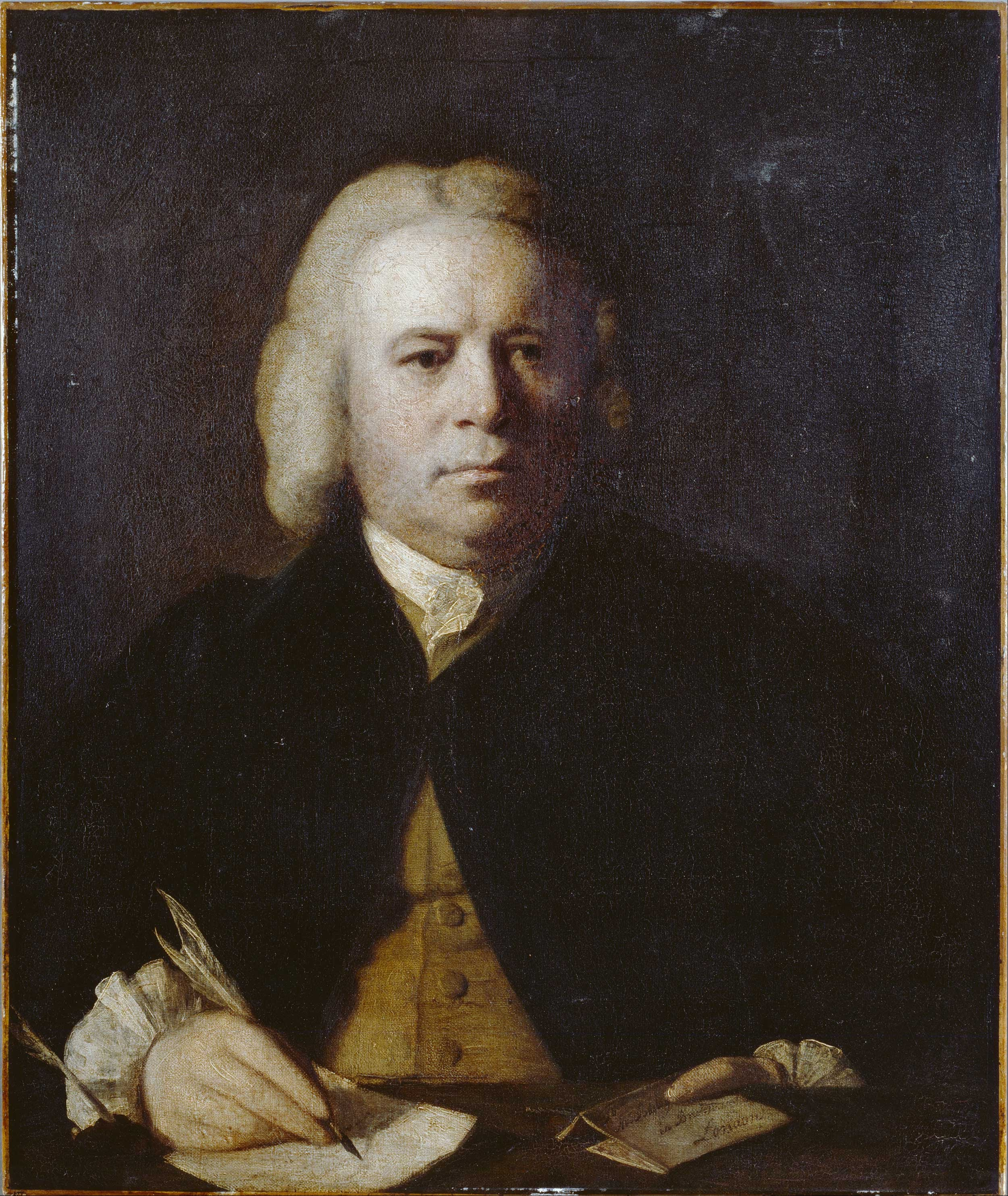
- Dodsley by Reynolds, 1760
- Born: 13 February 1703; Mansfield, England
- Died: 23 September 1764 (aged 61)
- Burial place: Durham, England
- Notable work: Cleone

Robert Dodsley (13 February 1703 – 23 September 1764) was an English bookseller, publisher, poet, playwright, and miscellaneous writer.

== Life ==
Dodsley was born near Mansfield, Nottinghamshire, where his father was master of the free school. He is said to have been apprenticed to a stocking-weaver in Mansfield, from whom he ran away, going into service as a footman for the Honourable Mrs.Jane Lowther, widow of General Thomas Lowther. Dodsley worked for her household at Whitehall around the late 1720s and early 1730s. Profits and fame from his early literary works enabled Dodsley to establish himself with the help of his friends (Alexander Pope lent him £100) as a bookseller at the sign of Tully's Head in Pall Mall, London, in 1735.

He soon became one of the foremost publishers of the day. One of his first publications was Samuel Johnson's London for which he paid ten guineas in 1738. He published many of Johnson's works, and he suggested and helped to finance Johnson's Dictionary. Pope also made over to Dodsley his interest in his letters. In 1738, the publication of Paul Whitehead's Manners was voted scandalous by the House of Lords and led to Dodsley's imprisonment for a brief period. Dodsley published for Edward Young and Mark Akenside, and in 1751 brought out Thomas Gray's Elegy. He was also publisher to the Rev. Joseph Spence and Joseph Warton, and collaborated with John Baskerville, the innovative Birmingham printer.

In 1759, Dodsley retired, leaving the conduct of the business to his brother James, with whom he had been in partnership for many years. He died and was buried at Durham while he was on a visit to his friend Joseph Spence.

== Works ==
In 1729, Dodsley published his first work, Servitude: a Poem written by a Footman; in addition to a didactic poem in heroic couplets, Dodsley's pamphlet contained a prose preface with advice to employers and a postscript response to a scurrilous pamphlet by Daniel Defoe ("Every Body's Business, is no Body's," 1728). A collection of short poems, A Muse in Livery, or the Footman's Miscellany, was published by subscription in 1732, Dodsley's patrons comprising many persons of high rank. This was followed by a satirical farce called The Toy-Shop (Covent Garden, 1735), in which the toymaker indulges in moral observations on his wares, a hint which was probably taken from Thomas Randolph's Conceited Pedlar. In 1737 his King and the Miller of Mansfield, a "dramatic tale" of King Henry II, was produced at Drury Lane, where it was received with much applause; Dodsley's play adapted a well-known ballad for the stage. A sequel, Sir John Cockle at Court (1738), which was substantially Dodsley's own work and invention, was not so well received. Dodsley displayed his egalitarian leanings with the anonymous The Chronicle of the Kings of England by "Nathan ben Saddi" (1740), rewriting English history in the style of the King James Version of the Pentateuch. The Oeconomy of Human Life appeared in 1750, a collection of moral precepts attributed to ancient authors in India and China, set out in a King James Version style of English attributed to an anonymous translator.

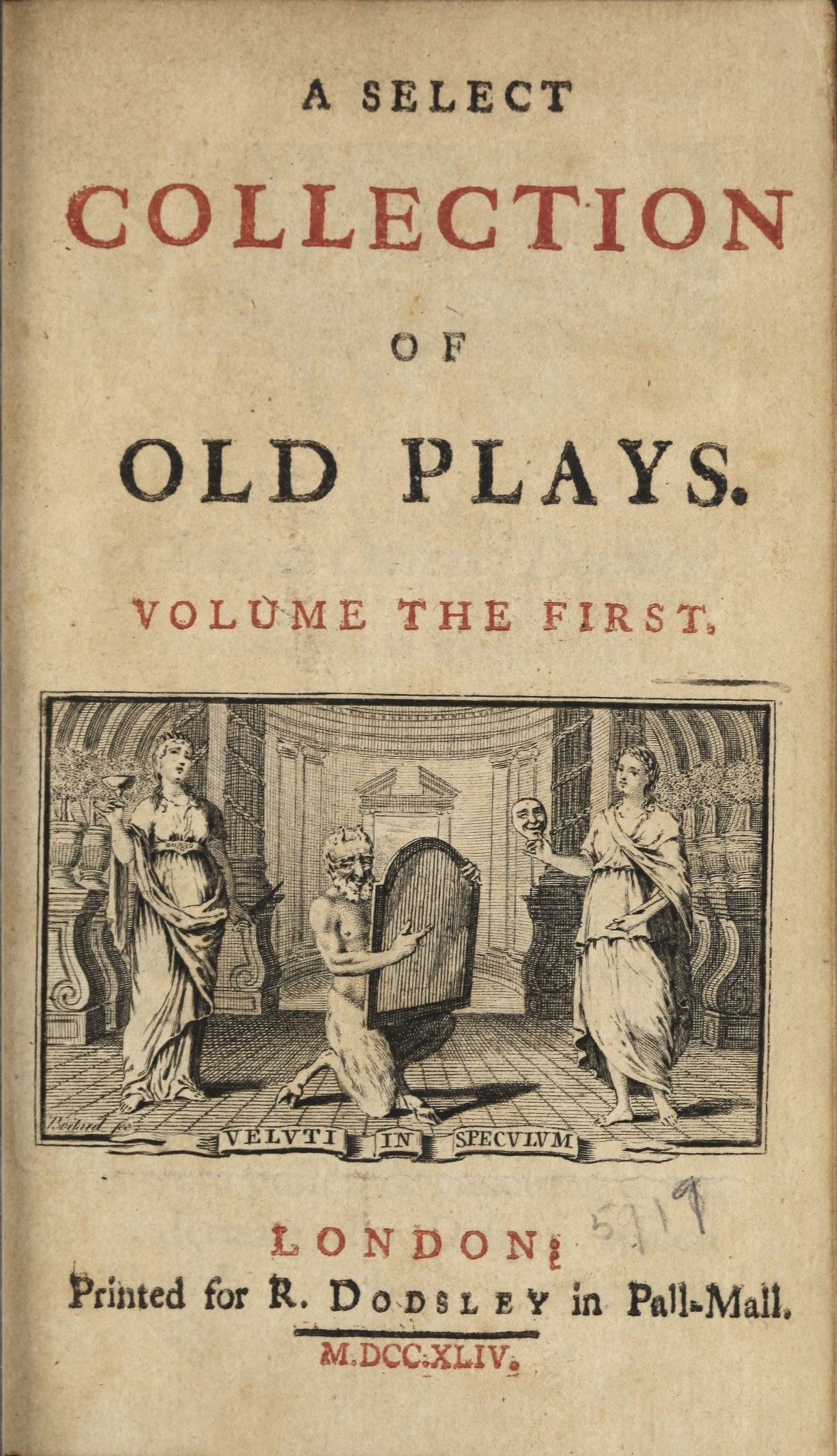
Title page of the first edition of A Select Collection of Old Plays (1744)

Dodsley is, however, best known as the editor of two collections, one of plays, and one of poems. The first was the Select Collection of Old Plays (10 vols., 1744; two further volumes, 1745); 2nd edition with notes by Isaac Reed, 12 vols., 1780; 4th edition, by William Carew Hazlitt, 1874–1876, 15 vols). Dodsley's collection of poems, A collection of Poems by Several Hands (1748, 3 vols.) was ‘to preserve to the public those poetical performances, which seemed to merit a longer remembrance than what would probably be secured to them by the Manner wherein they were originally published’ (Collection of Poems, 1748, vol. 1.iii–iv). Given his literary circle, he was able to fill three volumes of poetry by the time of the first edition on 15 January 1748. By March 1755 it had entered four editions and he added a fourth volume, and in 1758 volumes five and six, hence the change in titles.

In 1745 he published a collection of his dramatic works, and some poems which had been issued separately in one volume under the modest title of Trifles. This was followed by The Triumph of Peace, a Masque occasioned by the Treaty of Aix-la-Chapelle (1749); his three-canto blank verse georgic on Agriculture (1753), originally intended as part of a longer work to be titled Public Virtue; The Blind Beggar of Bethnal Green (acted at Drury Lane 1739, printed 1741); and an ode, Melpomene (1751). His tragedy of Cleone (1758) had a long run at Covent Garden, 2000 copies being sold on the day of publication, and it passed through four editions within the year.

Dodsley also founded several literary periodicals: The Museum (1746–1767, 3 vols.); The Preceptor containing a general course of education (1748, 2 vols.), with an introduction by Dr Johnson; The World (1753–1756, 4 vols.); and The Annual Register, founded in 1758 with Edmund Burke as editor. To these various works, Horace Walpole, Akenside, Soame Jenyns, Lord Lyttelton, Lord Chesterfield, Burke and others were contributors.

He produced and published more successful works towards the end of his life. The Select Fables of Esop (1761), which remained in print in various editions for many decades, for which he and some of his friends wrote additional fables. The Works of William Shenstone (3 vols., 1764–1769) was brought out as a memorial after Shenstone's sudden death, and was very selectively edited so as to show that writer at his best.

== List of selected works ==
- Dodsley, Robert, ed. (1744). A Select Collection of Old Plays (1st ed.). London: Robert Dodsley. 12 Volumes: 1 2 3 4 5 6 7 8 9 10 11 12
  - Reed, Isaac, ed. (1780). A Select Collection of Old Plays (2nd ed.). London: J. Dodsley. 12 Volumes: 1 2 3 4 5 6 7 8 9 10 11 12
  - Collier, John Payne, ed. (1825–27). A Select Collection of Old Plays (3rd ed.). London: Septimus Prowett. 12 Volumes: 1 2 3 4 5 6 7 8 9 10 11 12
  - Hazlitt, W. Carew, ed. (1874–76). A Select Collection of Old English Plays (4th ed.). London: Reeves and Turner. 15 Volumes: 1 2 3 4 5 6 7 8 9 10 11 12 13 14 15
- Dodsley, Robert (1745). Trifles. London: R. Dodsley.
- Dodsley, Robert, ed. (1748). A Collection of Poems by Several Hands (1st ed.). London: R. Dodsley. 3 Volumes.
  - Dodsley, Robert, ed. (1755). A Collection of Poems in Four Volumes by Several Hands (4th ed.). London: R. & J. Dodsley. V1 V2 V3 V4
  - Dodsley, Robert, ed. (1758). A Collection of Poems in Six Volumes by Several Hands (5th ed.). London: R. & J. Dodsley. V1 V2 V3 V4 V5 V6

== See also ==
- Book trade in the United Kingdom
- List of 18th-century British working-class writers

== Bibliography ==
- This article incorporates text from a publication now in the public domain: Chisholm, Hugh, ed. (1911). "Dodsley, Robert". Encyclopædia Britannica. Vol. 8 (11th ed.). Cambridge University Press. p. 373.
- Tierney, James E. "Dodsley, Robert (1704–1764)". Oxford Dictionary of National Biography (online ed.). Oxford University Press. doi:10.1093/ref:odnb/7755. (Subscription, Wikipedia Library access or UK public library membership required.)
- Knight, Charles. Shadows of the Old Booksellers. London: Bell and Daldy, 1865.
- "At Tully's Head." In Eighteenth Century Vignettes, 2nd series. Edited by Austin Dobson. London: Chatto and Windus, 1907.
- Banham, Martin. The Cambridge Guide to the Theatre. Cambridge: Cambridge University Press, 1995.
- Dickens, Charles. "The Muse in Livery" in "Household Words, A Weekly Journal" Vol. 11, No. 13, Whole No. 266, 1855
- Hartnoll, Phyllis. The Oxford Companion to the Theatre. Oxford: Oxford University Press, 1983.
- Solomon, Harry M. The Rise of Robert Dodsley: Creating the New Age of Print. Carbondale, Ill.: Southern Illinois University Press, 1996.
