= James Dodsley =

English bookseller (1724–1797)

James Dodsley (1724–1797) was an English bookseller.

== Life ==
Dodsley was born near Mansfield in Nottinghamshire in 1724. He was probably employed in the shop of his prosperous brother, Robert, by whom he was taken into partnership—the firm trading as R. & J. Dodsley in Pall Mall—and whom he eventually succeeded in 1759.

The plan of the tax on receipts was suggested by him to the Rockingham administration in 1782. On 7 June 1787 he lost £2,500 worth of quirestock, burnt in a warehouse. He paid the usual fine instead of serving the office of Sheriff of London and Middlesex in 1788.

He led a secluded life, and some years before his death gave up his shop, dealing wholesale in his own publications. The retail business was taken over by George Nicol. He kept a carriage many years, but studiously wished that his friends should not know it, nor did he ever use it on the eastern side of Temple Bar, according to the Gentleman's Magazine.

== Publications ==
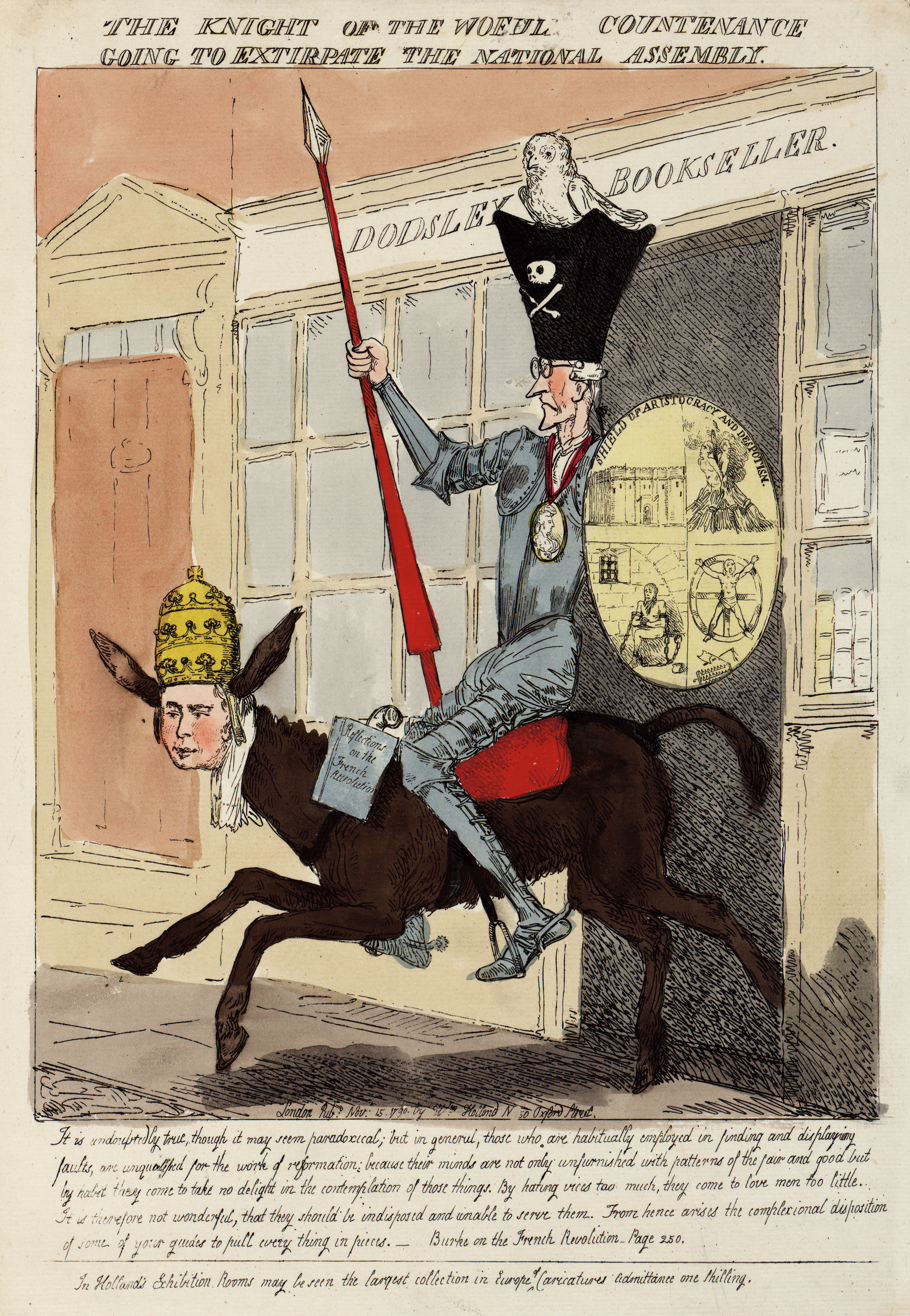
Political cartoon of Edmund Burke, with the shop labelled "Dodsley Bookseller" in the background, which had published Burke's Reflections on the Revolution in France in 1790.

R. & J. Dodsley printed the second edition of the first two volumes of Laurence Sterne's Tristram Shandy, as well as volumes three and four. James Dodsley is mentioned by name in Chapter IX of volume one, in which the protagonist announces that he will dedicate the book to any aristocrat willing to pay fifty guineas, and asks for "the sum to be paid into the hands of Mr. Dodsley, for the benefit of the author".

In 1775 he printed A Petition and Complaint touching a Piracy of "Letters by the late Earl of Chesterfield". A list of 41 works published by him is advertised at the end of Thomas Hull's Select Letters, 1778, 2 vols, 8vo. In 1780 he produced an improved edition of the Collection of Old Plays, 12 vols, edited by Isaac Reed, who also edited for him again, two years later, the 'Collection of Poems,' 6 vols. He was a member of the "Congeries", a club of booksellers who produced Samuel Johnson's Lives of the Poets and other works. Dodsley was the puzzled referee in a well-known bet about Oliver Goldsmith's lines,

For he who fights and runs away
May live to fight another day,

which George Selwyn correctly contended were not to be found in Butler's Hudibras.

Dodsley carried on an extensive business, but had other interests; writing from Woodstock on 26 July 1789 Thomas King refers to his farming and haymaking. Eighteen thousand copies of Edmund Burke's Reflections on the Revolution in France were sold by him in 1790.

== Death ==
He died on 19 February 1797 at his house in Pall Mall in his seventy-fourth year, and was buried in St James's Church, Westminster. His monument was sculpted by John Flaxman RA.

He left the bulk of his fortune, estimated at £70,000, to nephews and nieces.
