= Cleone (play) =

Play by Robert Dodsley

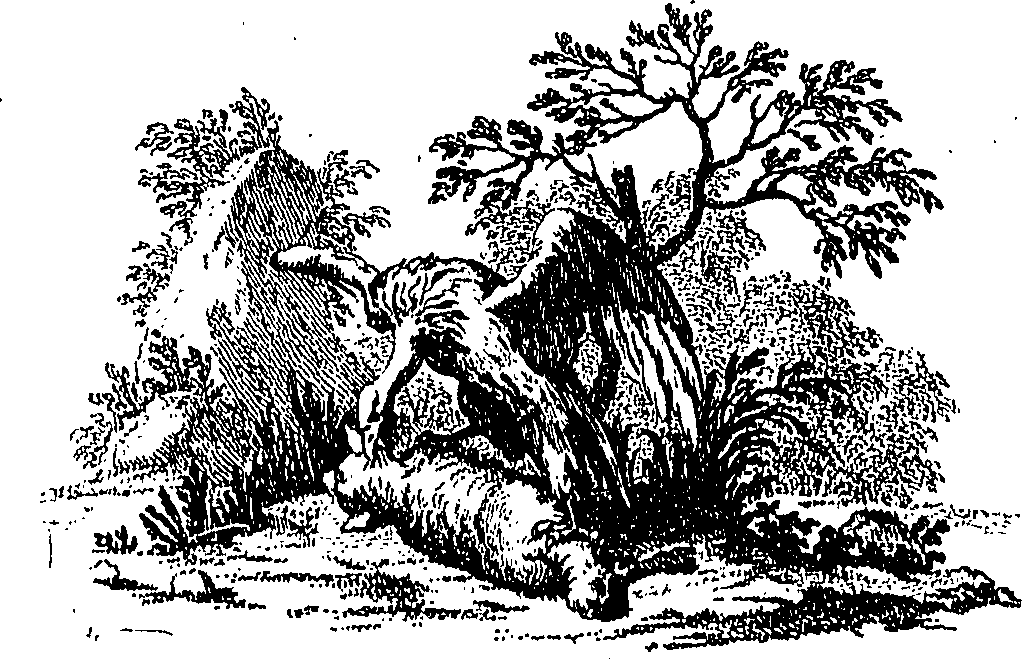
- Illustration from published version of play.
- Original language: English
- Written by: Robert Dodsley
- Genre: Tragedy
- Setting: Medieval England

Premiere
- Date: 2 December 1758
- Place: Covent Garden Theatre, London

Cleone is a 1758 tragedy by the British writer Robert Dodsley. The play is set some time during the late AD 730s- despite the presence of police officers, a profession that was not extant in the Middle Ages- and centers on the villainous Glanville's attempt to have the titular character murdered and frame his own brother for the crime.

The original Covent Garden cast included David Ross as Siffroy, Luke Sparks as Glanville, Isaac Ridout as Beaufort senior and George Anne Bellamy as Cleone. The play was first printed on the 5th of December, 1758, appended with a poem, titled "Melpomene" which extolled the virtues of domestic tragedy as a genre of dramatic poetry.

== Plot summary ==
The plot concerns a woman named Cleone, whose brother-in-law, Glanville, attempts to convince her husband that she is unfaithful. Glanville decides to have his servant kill Cleone so Glanville can frame his own brother, Siffroy for the murder; Glanville plans to have it believed that Siffroy has murdered Cleone in a jealous rage. Glanville involves his devoted wife, Isabella, in his scheme, carrying it out under the pretext that he is avenging himself against Siffroy for stealing his fortune, but in reality, Glanville is motivated by his jealousy of Cleone, who has rebuffed his advances towards her. Isabella urges Cleone to flee the house in order to escape Siffroy's supposed jealousy. In reality, Glanville intends that the authorities assume Cleone was killed by her husband while she attempted to flee with her lover. Glanville's servant, Ragozin, accidentally murders Cleone's child instead of his intended target. Glanville and his servant are later found out and arrested by the police. Despite the attempts of her father, brother, and husband to rehabilitate her, an aggrieved Cleone dies of madness.

== Inspiration ==
Dodsley writes in the preface to Cleone that he has loosely based his play on the legend of St. Genevieve, referring to Genevieve of Brabant, who according to legend, was a virtuous woman framed for adultery. Dodsley indicates that Alexander Pope encouraged him to write a play adapted from this story.

== Reception ==
While generally well received in its time, and soon achieving the status of a stock play after its initial run, Cleone did spark at least one negative review that found the play too conventional and the character of Isabella unrealistic.

David Garrick disapproved of the play, considering it unnecessarily shocking and cruel. Dr. Samuel Johnson praised the play, telling the diarist James Boswell that if famed Restoration era dramatist Thomas Otway had written Cleone, "no other of his other pieces would have been remembered."

== Bibliography ==
- Nicoll, Allardyce. A History of English Drama 1660–1900: Volume III. Cambridge University Press, 2009.
- Hogan, C.B (ed.) The London Stage, 1660–1800: Volume V. Southern Illinois University Press, 1968.
- Dodsley, Robert Cleone a Tragedy as it is Acted at the Theatre-Royal at Covent Garden, the Fourth Edition. Printed for J. Dodsley at Pall Mall, 1771
