= The Female Quixote =

1752 novel by Charlotte Lennox

The Female Quixote; or the Adventures of Arabella
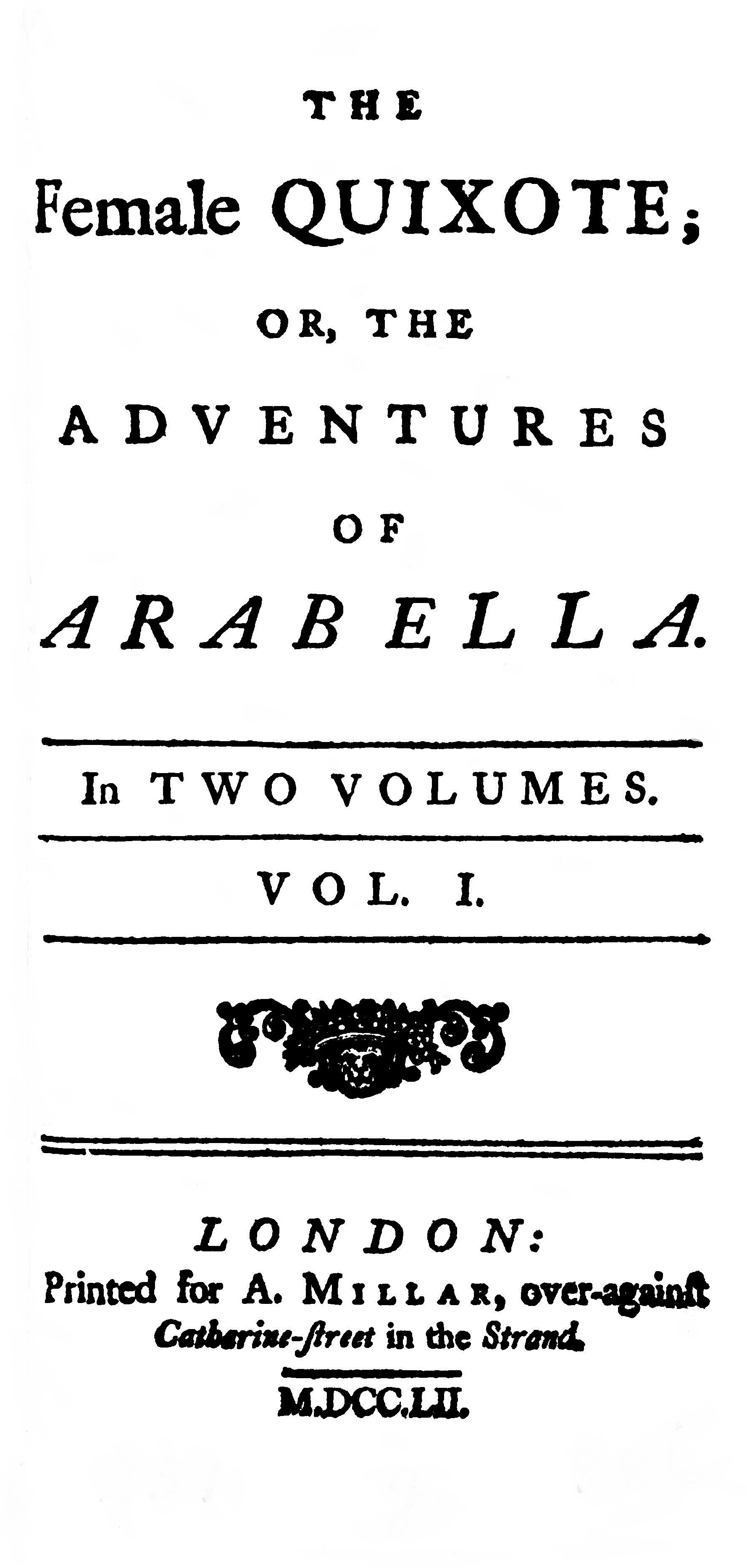
- Author: Charlotte Lennox
- Language: English
- Genre: Satirical novel
- Set in: England
- Publication date: 1752

The Female Quixote; or, The Adventures of Arabella is a comic novel by Scottish writer Charlotte Lennox imitating and parodying the ideas of Miguel de Cervantes' Don Quixote. Published in 1752, two years after she wrote her first novel, The Life of Harriot Stuart, it was her best-known and most-celebrated work. It was approved by both Henry Fielding and Samuel Richardson, applauded by Samuel Johnson, and used as a model by Jane Austen for Northanger Abbey. It has been called a burlesque, "satirical harlequinade", and a depiction of the real power of females. Norma Clarke has ranked it with Clarissa, Tom Jones and Roderick Random as one of the "defining texts in the development of the novel in the eighteenth century".

== Plot ==
Lady Arabella, the heroine of the novel, is brought up by her widowed father in a remote English castle, where she reads many French Romances, and, imagining them to be historically accurate, expects her life to be equally adventurous and romantic. Arabella's view of the world leads her into several misadventures; she mistakenly believes that a man is trying to kidnap her, she becomes convinced that a gardener is a nobleman operating under a disguise, and she inadvertently offends a woman visiting the countryside.

When she is 17, Arabella is introduced to her cousin, Glanville, whom her father expects her to marry. Upon meeting him, Arabella finds that her cousin falls short of her expectations for a proper suitor, which are founded on the heroes she finds in the novels of Madeleine de Scudery and Gauthier de Costes, seigneur de la Calprenède, but her attitude towards him begins to soften after he temporarily falls ill, as Arabella mistakenly believes that his condition has been brought on by unrequited love for her. At one point, Arabella decides to have Glanville read a portion of one of her favorite French novels. When Glanville pretends to have complied with Arabella's request, she begins to discuss the novel with him, but grows furious once it becomes apparent that he has lied to her. After learning how his daughter's mistaken notions of life have influenced her attitude towards Glanville, Arabella's father attempts to burn French Romances his child has read, but is stopped by his nephew. When Arabella's father falls ill and dies, he declares that she will lose part of her estate if she does not marry Glanville. Glanville departs for a time, intending to let Arabella grieve. After a period of mourning, Arabella is joined by Sir Charles, Glanville's father; Glanville's sister, Miss Glanville and Glanville. When she is taken to a horse race, Arabella meets Sir George Bellmour, Glanville's friend, who has been courting Miss Glanville. Upon discovering Arabella's delusions, Bellmour attempts to win her affections using the same chivalric language and high-flown style as in the French Romances that she loves.

After making many wild misconceptions based on her experience with French novels, Arabella leaves the countryside and visits Bath and London with her faithful lady's maid, Lucy; Glanville; Sir Charles; and Miss Glanville. Glanville is concerned at Arabella's mistaken ideas, but continues to love her. Glanville's vain and shallow sister envies Arabella's beauty, and occasionally attempts to contrive means of exposing Arabella's romantic delusions in order to give others a negative opinion of her. In Bath, Arabella is introduced to Mr. Tinsel, a superficial young socialite, and Mr. Hervey, a pseudo-intellectual who pretends to a vast knowledge of antiquity. Due to his own ignorance, Mr. Hervey takes Arabella's inaccurate understanding of ancient history for the truth, much to the amusement of Mr. Glanville. The lessons that Arabella has taken from 17th century French novels lead to comical misunderstandings involving both men. Arabella then meets a countess who intends to cure Arabella of her mistaken view of the world, but the former is forced to depart for the countryside after her mother falls ill. Mr. Glanville takes Arabella around what is now Central London; together they visit the Tower of London and St. James's Park. In Richmond, Bellmour hires an actress to frame Glanville as a libertine. Bellmour successfully deceives Arabella, who is left distraught at what she believes is Glanville's true nature. Shortly there afterwards, a depressed Arabella takes a walk around Twickenham with several other young women who live nearby, during which she silently hopes to encounter evidence of Glanville's innocence. When, imitating Clélie, she throws herself into the Thames in an attempt to flee from horsemen whom she mistakes for "ravishers", she becomes weak and ill.

In the meantime, Miss Glanville disguises herself as Arabella to test Bellmour's fidelity. As Glanville enters, he sees Bellmour making overtures to whom he thinks is Arabella. In a rage, Glanville stabs his friend. Immediately afterwards, an unconscious Arabella is carried inside. A doctor is called to take care of her. Arabella is eventually visited by a clergyman who, upon learning of Arabella's delusions concerning romance, explains to her the difference between literature and reality. He disparages 17th century French literature and praises the work of authors like Samuel Richardson. Afterwards, Bellmour admits his deception to Arabella. As a result of these events, Arabella finally decides to accept Glanville's hand in marriage. Bellmour ultimately recovers from his injuries and weds Miss Glanville, but it is implied that they are not happy together.

== Critical reception ==
The critical reception of The Female Quixote was generally favourable: its plot and elevated language, moral vision, and witty commentaries on romance novels were applauded. Fielding's Covent-Garden Journal gave a favorable notice of her book. Dr. Johnson gave a party in honor of her first novel, The Life of Harriot Stuart, in which he served a "magnificent hot apple-pye ... and this he would have stuck with bay-leaves," and "further, he had prepared for her a crown of laurel, with which, but not till he had invoked the muses by some ceremonies of his own invention, he encircled her brows". He was much taken with her work and supportive of The Female Quixote. However, Mrs. Barbauld criticized that it was "rather spun out too much, and not very well wound up." Ronald Paulson remarked that though at first the book seemed to focus "on the heroine's mind", it turned into an "intense psychological scrutiny of Arabella ... replaced by a rather clumsy attempt at the rapid satiric survey of society".

Critics have debated whether the last chapter of The Female Quixote was written by Lennox herself or Samuel Johnson, due to its stylistic differences that appeared to be similar to Johnson's own writing, that stand out from the other chapters of the book. Margaret Dalziel, editor of the 1970 edition of The Female Quixote, mentioned characteristics which she believed to be of Johnson's in a two-page note in the heading of chapter eleven in book nine. However, in the appendix of the same edition, Duncan Isles rejected the claim, saying that the claim rested too much on subjective stylistic evidence. Other factors that suggest Johnson as the author of the last chapter include various typesetting differences. However, the errors have been attributed to various factors, including Lennox's difficulty to complete the last chapters, which likely would have led to her submitting them late to the printing press, resulting in the typeset errors.

== Derivative works ==
The American writer Tabitha Tenney's 1801 novel, Female Quixotism, is heavily influenced by The Female Quixote.
