= Charlotte Lennox =

Scottish writer (c. 1729 – 1804)

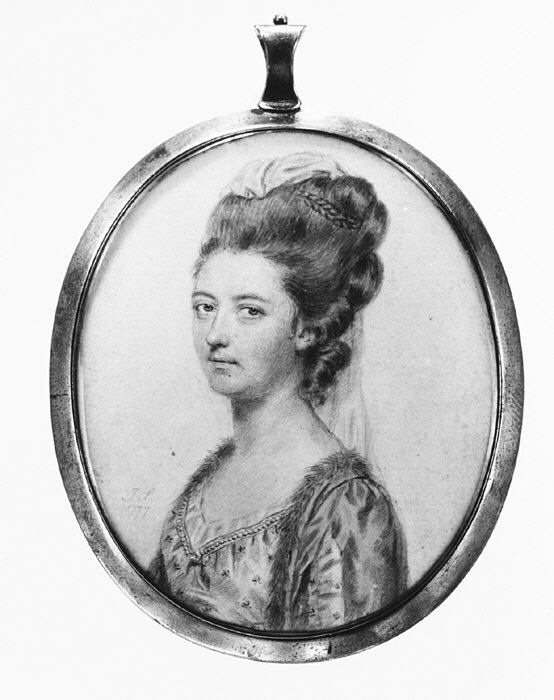
- Portrait by John Smart, 1777
- Born: Barbara Charlotte Ramsay; 1729; Gibraltar
- Died: 4 January 1804 (aged 74–75); London, England
- Occupations: author, literary and cultural critic
- Writing career
- Notable work: The Female Quixote

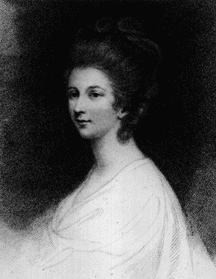
Engraving by Francesco Bartolozzi after Sir Joshua Reynolds, 1793 (National Portrait Gallery, D13802)

Charlotte Lennox, née Ramsay (c. 1729 – 4 January 1804), was a Scottish writer and a literary and cultural critic, whose publishing career flourished in London. Best known for her novel The Female Quixote (1752), she was frequently praised for her genius and literary skill. As a result, Sir Joshua Reynolds painted her portrait and she was featured in "The Nine Living Muses of Great Britain" in 1778. Samuel Johnson declared her superior to all other female writers, and Henry Fielding said that she "excelled Cervantes." Her pioneering study of Shakespeare's source material is still cited and her magazine (1760–1761) is the focus of "The Lady's Museum Project."

== Life ==
Lennox was born in Gibraltar. Her father, James Ramsay of Dalhousie, was a Scottish captain in the British Army, and her mother, Catherine, née Tisdall (died 1765), was Scottish and Irish. She was baptized Barbara Charlotte Ramsay. Very little direct information on her pre-public life is available, and biographers have extrapolated from her first novel such elements as seem semi-autobiographical. Charlotte lived the first ten years of her life in England before her father, who was a lieutenant in the guards, moved the family to Albany, New York in 1738, where he was lieutenant-governor. He died in 1742.

Lennox's experiences in the colonies probably inspired her first and last novels, Harriot Stuart (1750) and Euphemia (1790). Around the age of 13, she was sent to be a companion to her maternal aunt Mary Lucking in London, but on her arrival she found that the son of her future guardian had died and the arrangement was no longer suitable. Instead, Charlotte's writing seems to have caught the attention of Lady Isabella Finch, who had an extensive library and offered her protection.

Lennox's first volume of poetry, Poems on Several Occasions, published in 1747, was dedicated to Lady Isabella and centred partly on themes of female friendship and independence. She might have been offered a position at court, but this was forestalled by her marriage to Alexander Lennox, and her decision to take up acting and to publish her works (and thereby earn her own income). Her husband's only known employment was in the customs office from 1773 to 1782, and this was reported to be as a benefice of the Duke of Newcastle as a reward for his wife. He also claimed to be the proper heir to the Earl of Lennox in 1768, but the House of Lords rejected his claims, possibly on the basis of bastardy. Charlotte mentioned his "birth misfortunes" in a letter.

In 1746, after turning away from a life of aristocratic patronage, seventeen-year-old Lennox took on a public role for the first time. She performed in a successful run of The Fair Penitent, which was part of a series of "civic" dramas at Drury Lane dealing with social issues of politics and gender. After the publication of her first poems, Poems on Several Occasions (1747), she began to shift away from acting towards writing. However, she did perform at Richmond in 1748 and received a benefit night at the Haymarket Theatre in a production of The Mourning Bride in 1750. In the latter year, she also published her most successful poem, "The Art of Coquetry" in the Gentleman's Magazine. She met Samuel Johnson around that time, and he held her in high regard. When her first novel, The Life of Harriot Stuart, Written by Herself, appeared, Johnson threw a lavish party for Lennox, with a laurel wreath and an apple pie that contained bay leaf. Johnson thought her superior to his other female literary friends, Elizabeth Carter, Hannah More, and Frances Burney, due to her efforts to professionalize her writing career, rather than write anonymously. He ensured that Lennox was introduced to important members of the London literary scene.

However, some of the women of Johnson's circle were not fond of Lennox. Hester Thrale, Elizabeth Carter, and Lady Mary Wortley Montagu, all members of the Bluestocking Society, faulted her either for her housekeeping (which even Lennox joked about), for her ostensibly unpleasant personality, or for her bad temper. They saw her specifically as an incendiary.

Samuel Richardson and Samuel Johnson both favourably reviewed Lennox's second, most successful novel, The Female Quixote, or, The Adventures of Arabella (1752). Henry Fielding praised it in his Covent Garden Journal and it gained popularity. It was reprinted and packaged in a series of great novels in 1783, 1799, and 1810, and translated into German in 1754, French in 1773 and 1801, and Spanish in 1808. The novel formally inverts Don Quixote: as the Don mistakes himself for the knightly hero of a romance. Arabella, also informed by earnest reading, mistakes herself for the maiden love of a romance. While the Don thinks it is his duty to praise the platonically pure damsels he meets (such as the farm girl he loves), so Arabella believes it is in her power to kill with a look and that her lovers have a duty to suffer ordeals on her behalf.

Some of Lennox's other works were advertised as being by "the author of The Female Quixote". The translator/censor of the Spanish version, Lt-Col. Don Bernardo María de Calzada, appropriated the text, stating "written in English by an unknown author and in Spanish by D. Bernardo," even though he was not fluent in English and had only translated into Spanish a previous French translation, which was already censored. In the preface, de Calzada also warns the reader of the questionable quality of the text, as good British texts were only written by "Fyelding" [sic] and Richardson, the two authors of international fame.

Lennox cultivated friendships that assisted her in her publishing efforts. For her translation of The Greek Theatre of Father Brumoy, the most influential French study of Greek tragedy in the mid-18th century, she found several learned men to contribute. In 1755, she translated Memoirs of Maximilian de Bethune, Duke of Sully, which sold well. Learning several languages, including Italian from Joseph Baretti, Lennox studied the sources for William Shakespeare's plays. In 1753, the first two volumes of Shakespear Illustrated – seen by many scholars as the first feminist work of literary criticism – were published by Andrew Millar. The third volume, which appeared in 1754, spoke to its success. Lennox studied and discussed how Shakespeare used his sources and was especially attentive to the romance tradition on which Shakespeare drew. One criticism Lennox had was that his plays strip female characters of their original authority, "taking from them the power and the moral independence which the old romances and novels had given them."

Samuel Johnson wrote the dedication for Shakespear Illustrated, but others criticized its treatment, in David Garrick's words, by "so great and so Excellent an Author." and the literary world took its revenge upon the presentation of her play, The Sister (1769), based on her third novel, Henrietta (1758). Several groups of attendees concerted to boo the play off the stage on its opening night, though it went on to be printed in several editions.

Henrietta sold well, but did not bring her any money. From 1760 to 1761 she edited and wrote for the periodical The Lady's Museum, which included her novel Harriot and Sophia (later Sophia), known as one of two of the earliest serialized novels (along with Tobias Smollett's The Life and Adventures of Sir Launcelot Greaves). Lennox called this magazine "a course in female education" and included the learned subjects botany, history, astronomy, medicine, literary criticism, zoology, and theology. David Garrick produced her Old City Manners at Theatre Royal, Drury Lane in 1775 (an adaptation of Ben Jonson's Eastward Ho). The play saw at least nine performances over two seasons, favourable reviews, and publication. Lennox was described as "a Lady well known as a favourite attendant in the train of the muses." Finally, in 1790, Lennox published Euphemia with little success, as the public's interest in novels of romance seemed to have waned. Euphemia is an epistolary novel set in New York before the American Revolution and describes relationships between Native Americans and the British, primarily Mohawks and Hurons.

Lennox had two children who survived infancy: Harriot Holles Lennox (1765–1782/3) and George Lewis Lennox (born 1771), who emigrated to America in 1793. In that same year, she and her husband, with whom she had been estranged for many years, separated. Charlotte then lived in "solitary penury" for the rest of her life, relying on support from the Literary Fund. She died on 4 January 1804 in London and was buried in an unmarked grave not far from "Dean's yard, Westminster," the area of London currently called St. John's Gardens.

During the 19th century, The Female Quixote remained moderately popular. In the 20th century, feminist scholars such as Janet Todd, Jane Spencer, and Nancy Armstrong praised Lennox's skill and inventiveness. Five of Lennox's six novels have been published in a modern edition.

The Female Quixote has been chosen for the 2024 Aggregation exam to certify English teachers in France.

== Works ==
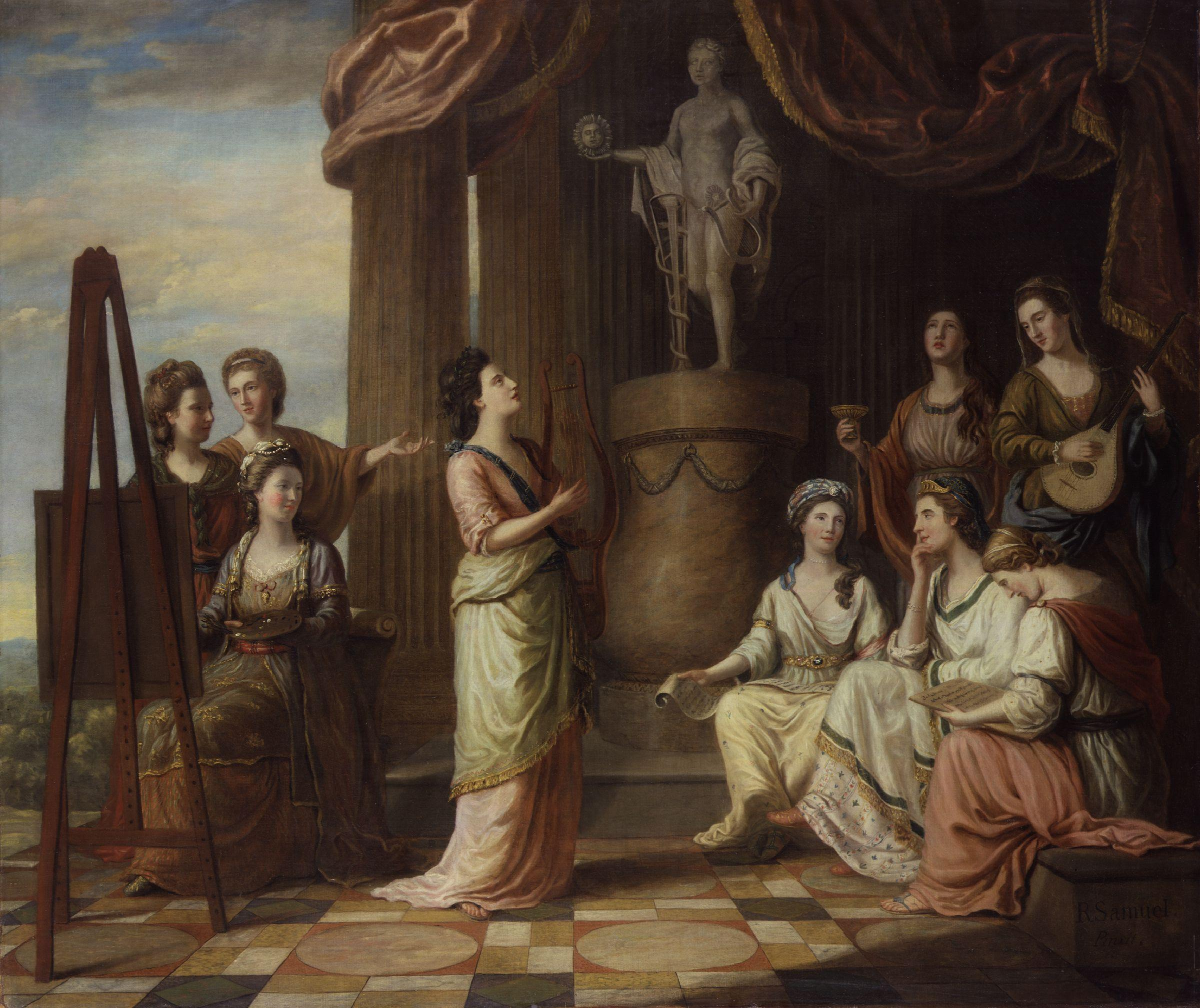
1778 painting of the Blue Stockings Society showing Lennox standing first from right

=== Poetry ===
- Poems on Several Occasions (1747)
- The Art of Coquetry (1750)
- Birthday Ode to the Princess of Wales

=== Novels ===
- The Life of Harriot Stuart (1751)
- The Female Quixote (1752)
- Henrietta (1758)
- Sophia (1762)
- Eliza (1766)
- Euphemia (1790)
- Hermione (1791)

=== Plays ===
- Philander (1758)
- The Sister (1769)
- Old City Manners (1775)

=== Literary criticism ===
- Shakespear [sic] Illustrated (1753–1754)

=== Periodical ===
- The Lady's Museum (1760–1761)

=== Translations ===
- 1756:
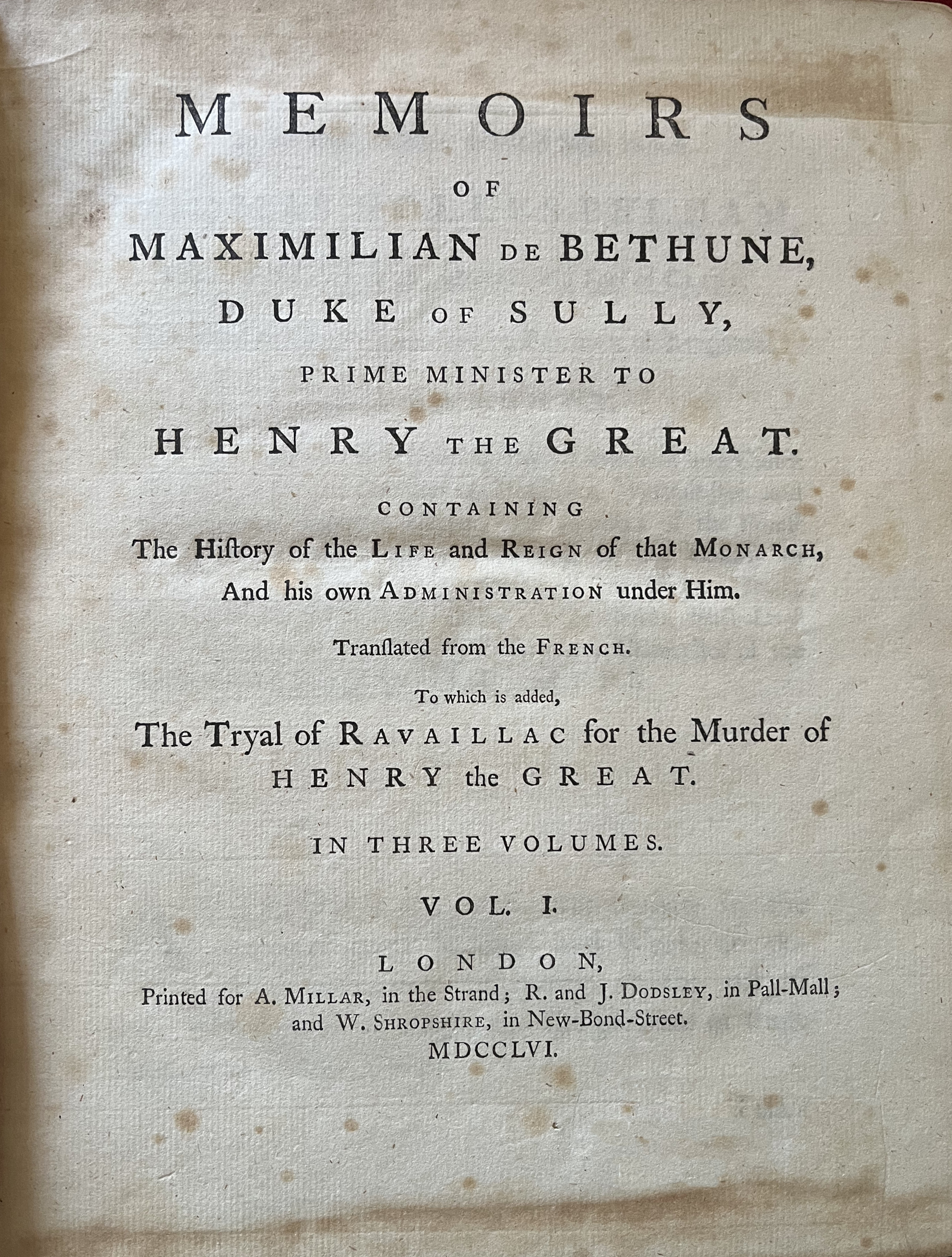
  Memoirs of Maximilian de Bethune, Duke of Sully
  Memoirs of Maximilian de Bethune, Duke of Sully
- 1756: The Memoirs of the Countess of Berci
- 1757: Memoirs for the History of Madame de Maintenon and of the Last Age
- 1759: The Greek Theatre of Father Brumoy
- 1774: Meditations and Penitential Prayers by the Duchess de la Valière
