= Stillingfleet (surname) =

Stillingfleet is a surname, and may refer to:

- Edward Stillingfleet (1635–1699), English theologian and scholar, author of Unreasonableness of Separation
- Edward Stillingfleet (physician) (1660–1708), English physician and clergyman
- Benjamin Stillingfleet (1702–1771), English botanist, translator and author
- James Stillingfleet (priest, born 1674) (1674–1746), Dean of Worcester
- James Stillingfleet (priest, born 1741) (1741–1826), English evangelical cleric

== See also ==
- Stillingfleet, village in North Yorkshire, England
