= Hannah More (1856 ship) =

History
- Name: Hannah More
- Namesake: Hannah More
- Builder: James Smith, St John, New Brunswick
- Launched: 1856

General characteristics
- Tonnage: 1129 GRT

Hannah More was a wooden full-rigged ship built by James Smith, St John, New Brunswick and launched in 1856. She was used in the passenger and cargo trade to Australia from about 1860.

Departing Liverpool on 12 February 1860, under Captain Murphy, with 372 immigrants arriving in Sydney on 6 May, and placed in quarantine for five days due to smallpox on board. She departed Sydney on 5 July in ballast for Callao.

She arrived in Melbourne on 11 November 1861, before sailing for Otago, New Zealand on 6 December.

She was sold in 1864 and was wrecked on the Lundy Island in 1866.
