= Wood Norton =

Wood Norton may refer to:

- Wood Norton Hall, a country house in Worcestershire, England
- Wood Norton, Norfolk, a village in Norfolk, England
