= Bluestocking =

Term for an educated, intellectual woman

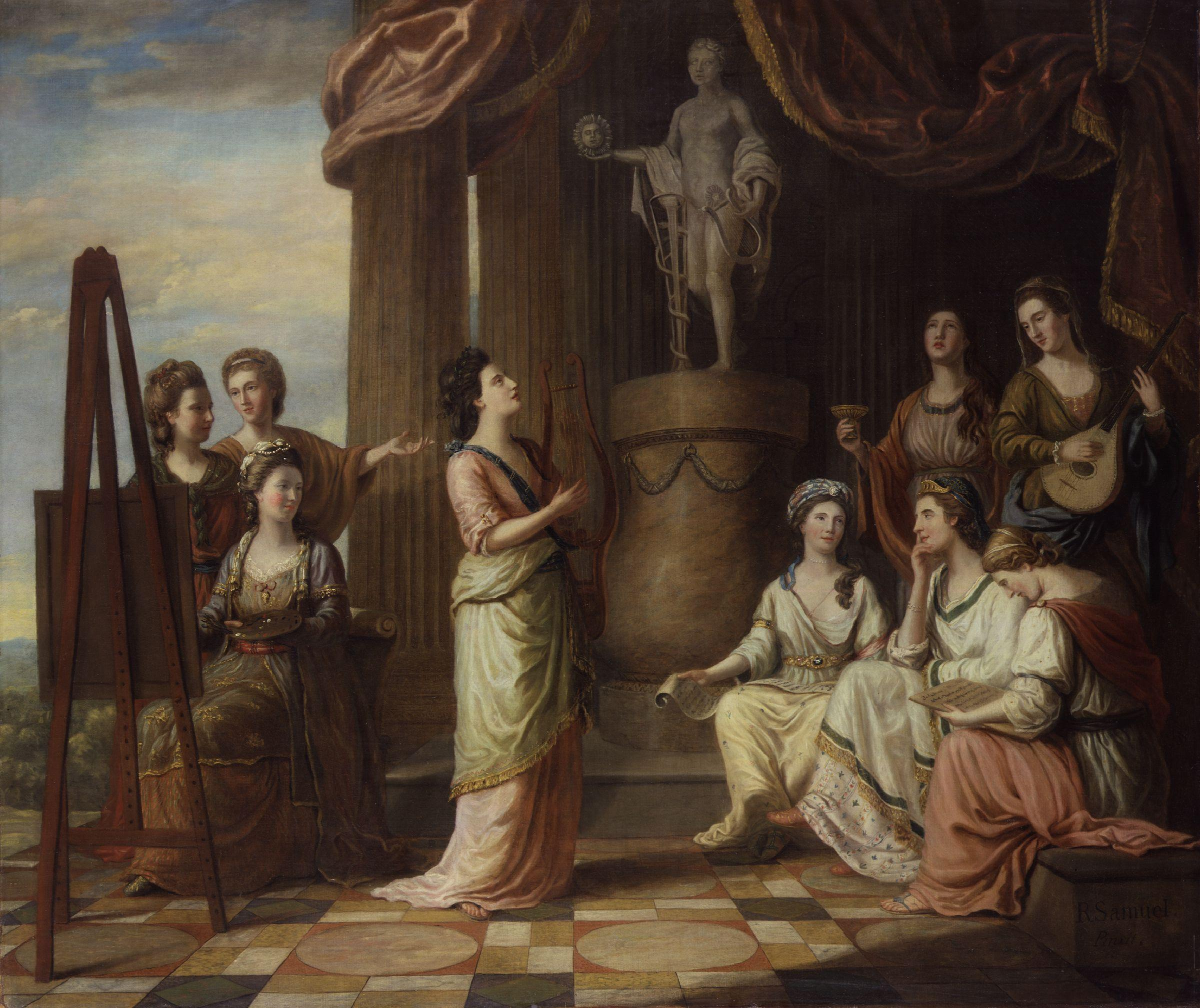
1778 painting of the Blue Stockings Society

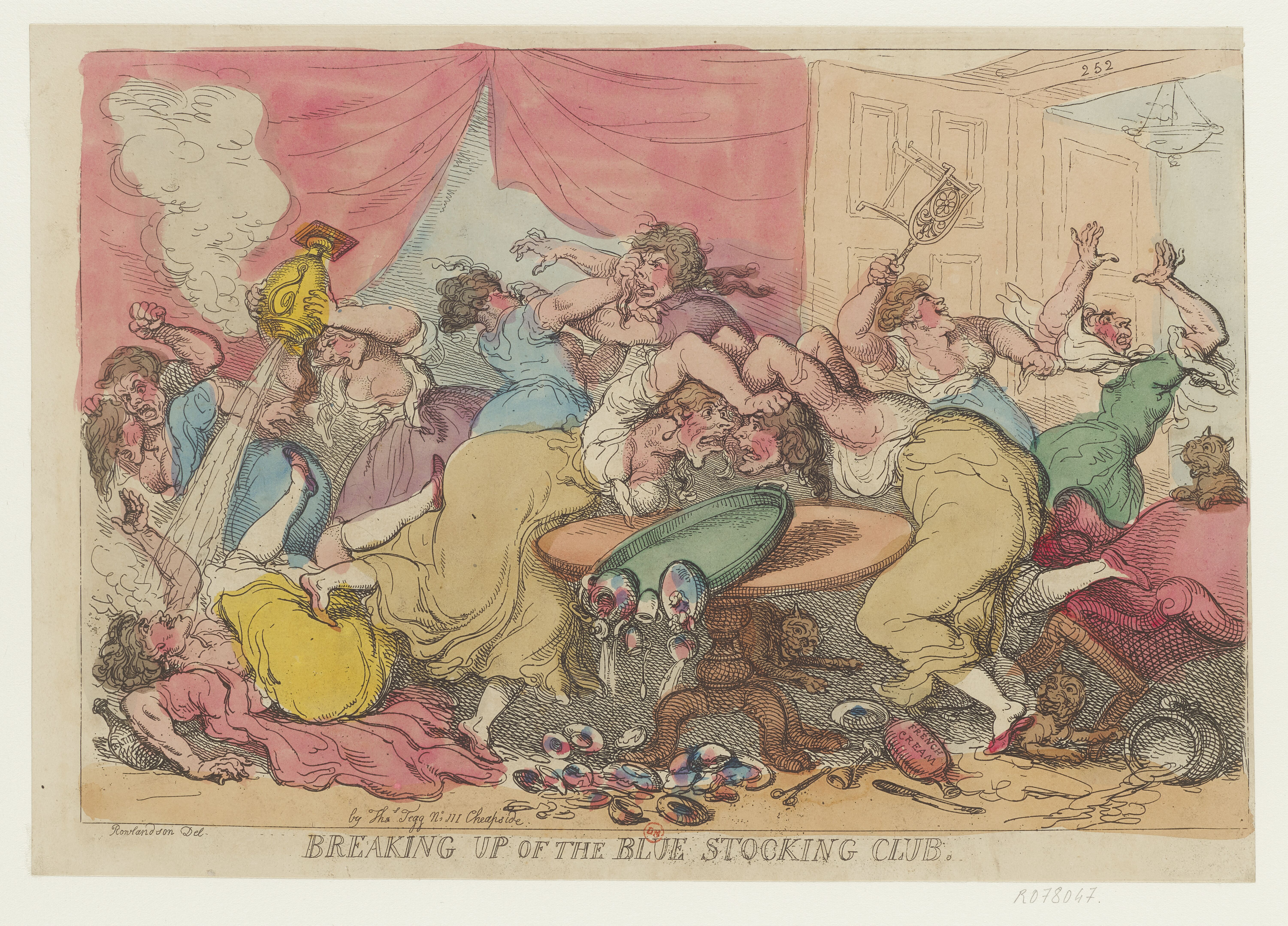
1815 caricature of bluestockings by Thomas Rowlandson

Bluestocking (also spaced blue-stocking or blue stockings) is a term for an educated, intellectual woman, originally a member of the 18th-century Blue Stockings Society from England led by the hostess and critic Elizabeth Montagu (1718–1800), the "Queen of the Blues", including Elizabeth Vesey (1715–1791), Hester Chapone (1727–1801) and the classicist Elizabeth Carter (1717–1806). In the following generation came Hester Lynch Piozzi (1741–1821), Hannah More (1745–1833) and Frances Burney (1752–1840). The modern term applies more broadly to women who show interest in literary or intellectual matters.

Until the late 18th century, the term had referred to learned people of both sexes. It was later applied primarily to intellectual women and the French equivalent bas bleu had a similar connotation. The term later developed negative implications and is now often used in a derogatory manner. The reference to blue stockings may arise from the time when woollen worsted stockings were informal dress, in contrast to formal, fashionable black silk stockings. The most frequent such reference is to a man, Benjamin Stillingfleet, who reportedly lacked the formal black stockings, yet participated in the Blue Stockings Society. As Frances Burney, a Bluestocking, recounts the events, she reveals that Stillingfleet was invited to a literary meeting by Elizabeth Vesey but was told off because of his informal attire. Her response was "don't mind dress! Come in your blue stockings!".

== History ==
The Blue Stockings Society was a literary society led by Elizabeth Montagu and others in the 1750s in England. Elizabeth Montagu was a social anomaly in the period because she took possession of her husband's property when he died, allowing her to have more power in her world. This society was founded by women, and included many prominent members of English society, both male and female, including Harriet Bowdler, Edmund Burke, Sarah Fielding, Samuel Johnson, and Frances Pulteney. M.P., an 1811 comic opera by Thomas Moore and Charles Edward Horn, was subtitled The Blue Stocking. It contained a character, Lady Bab Blue, who was a parody of bluestockings.

A reference to bluestockings has been attributed to John Amos Comenius in his 1638 book, where he mentioned ancient traditions of women being excluded from higher education, citing the Bible and Euripides. That second reference, though, comes from Keatinge's 1896 translation and is not present in Comenius's Latin text. (Note: Comenius cites Euripides' tragedy Hippolytus, where Hippolytus says, "I detest a bluestocking. May there never be a woman in my house who knows more than is fitting for a woman to know", to which Comenius answers: "These opinions, I opine, stand in no true opposition to our demand. For we are not advising that women be educated in such a way that their tendency to curiosity shall be developed, but so that their sincerity and contentedness may be increased, and this chiefly in those things which it becomes a woman to know and to do; that is to say, all that enables her to look after her household and to promote the welfare of her husband and her family." John Amos Comenius (1633–1638), Didactica Magna (The Great Didactic, translation by M. W. Keatinge, London: Adam and Charles Black, 1896), p. 220) The name may have been applied in the 15th century to the blue stockings worn by the members of the Compagnie della Calza in Venice, which then was adopted in Paris and London; in the 17th century to the Covenanters in Scotland, who wore unbleached woollen stockings, in contrast to the bleached or dyed stockings of the more affluent. In 1870 Henry D. Wheatley noted that Elizabeth Montagu's coterie were named "blue stockings" after the blue worsted stockings worn by the naturalist Benjamin Stillingfleet. (Note: 'Benjamin Stillingfleet, the celebrated naturalist, who is described by [Thomas] Gray as living in a garret in order that he might be able to support some near relations, died at his lodgings opposite to Burlington House on 15 December 1771 at the age of sixty-nine. It was his blue worsted stockings that gave the name "blue stocking" to the ladies of Mrs Montagu's coterie.' Henry D. Wheatley, Round About Piccadilly And Pall Mall, London: Smith Elder (1870), p. 42.)

William Hazlitt said, "The bluestocking is the most odious character in society...she sinks wherever she is placed, like the yolk of an egg, to the bottom, and carries the filth with her".

== Recent use ==
In Japan, the literary magazine Seitō (also known by its translated title Bluestocking) was launched in 1911 under the leadership of Raichō Hiratsuka. It ran until 1916, providing a creative outlet and political platform for Japanese feminists even as it faced public outcry and state censorship.

Founded in 2008 at Oxford University, Bluestocking Oxford is a feminist magazine that publishes fortnightly profiles on women's intellectual and artistic achievements throughout history. The magazine was revived in 2023 and it has since expanded to host intellectual discussion events in a traditional salon format at Christ Church. Since 2024 the Editor in Chief has been Olivia Hurton, author, poet and London theatre critic, who has edited the letters of original Bluestocking hostess, Elizabeth Montagu. The magazine's patron is renowned historian Lady Antonia Fraser.
