= Elizabeth Vesey =

Irish socialite (1715–1791)

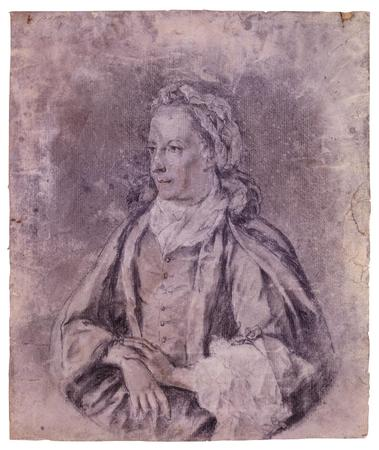
- Unknown artist. Elizabeth Vesey, circa 1755–65. National Portrait Gallery, London
- Born: 1715; Ossory, Ireland
- Died: 1791 (aged 75–76); London, England

Elizabeth Vesey (1715 in Ossory, Ireland – 1791 in Chelsea, London) was a wealthy Irish intellectual who is credited with fostering the Blue Stockings Society, a society which hosted informal literary and political discussions of which she was an important member.

== Early life ==
Born in Ossory, Ireland in 1715, she was daughter of Sir Thomas Vesey, Bishop of Ossory, and his wife, Mary. The Veseys were an important Anglo-Irish family.

== Marriages ==
Her first marriage, sometime before December 1731, was to William Hancock, member for the borough of Fore in the Irish Parliament, who died in 1741.

In 1746 she married again to Agmondesham Vesey of Lucan, a wealthy cousin and a Member of the Irish Parliament for Harristown, County Kildare, and Kinsale, County Cork, He was accountant-general of Ireland. Elizabeth had no children from either marriage. Agmondesham was continuously unfaithful to Elizabeth but she maintained the façade of a happy marriage. She nursed her husband through attacks of epilepsy, but depended for her support upon a circle of female friends. Vesey's well-known friends included Mary Delany, whom she met in Ireland, Margaret, Duchess of Portland, Elizabeth Montagu, Elizabeth Carter, Frances Burney, and Hannah More. Her closest companion was the sister of her first husband, a Miss Handcock whose first name is not known. The shy Miss Handcock carried out most of the duties of domestic household management for Elizabeth. She was always noted politely by Vesey's correspondents, but she seems to have stayed in the background in the salon.

== Bluestocking group ==
Elizabeth Montagu was a very close friend, and Elizabeth co-operated with her in establishing a salon where repartee and intelligent discussion were more important than the usual drinking, card play, and sexual flirtation. They referred to their circle as the bluestocking philosophers.

Her marriage meant Elizabeth split her time between London, England and Lucan in Ireland, but eventually settled mostly in London at houses in Clarges Street and Bolton Row, Mayfair. At these she hosted her intellectual salon parties., where entertainment consisted of conversations on literary subjects.

Her circle included Frances Boscawen, Edmund Burke, David Garrick, Edward Gibbon, Samuel Johnson, Thomas Percy, Sir Joshua Reynolds, Richard Brinsley Sheridan, Adam Smith and Thomas Warton. Elizabeth did write, but she did not publish and her literary influence has been in her willingness to host the evening parties.

Her girlish figure and flirtatious wit earned her the nickname of Sylph. Elizabeth Vesey's vivacious personality and charm as a hostess made her salon the most memorable of the bluestocking group. One Mary Hamilton recorded her experience there in 1783:

...one meets with a charming variety of society … the Learned, the witty, the old & young, the grave, gay, wise & unwise, the fine bred Man & the pert coxcomb; The elegant female, the chaste Matron, the severe prude, & the pert Miss, but be it remembered that you can run no risque in Mrs. Vesey's parties of meeting with those who have no claim to respect.

== Demise and death ==
In 1782 both her own and her husband's health began to fail; she feared she was losing both her sight and hearing and Agmondesham Vesey died on 3 June 1785.

Vesey and Miss Handcock were left facing relative poverty when they found that Agmondesham had left them nothing in his will, despite leaving £1000 to his mistress. At the time of their marriage Elizabeth had turned over all her own funds to her new husband. Their only income was Vesey's jointure and Handcock's annuity which together brought in about £800 a year. Some help was given to the pair by various relatives and in 1788 they were able to move to the house of Vesey's cousin, Lord Cremorne in Chelsea.

In Chelsea, Elizabeth became consumed by a tearful depression. Despite brief appearances, she never again assumed the place she had previously held in society. Friends blamed her depression on her lack of religious conviction.

Miss Handcock died in January 1789 and Elizabeth followed early in 1791.

== Bibliography ==
- Vesey, Elizabeth (1926). The library of Mrs. Elizabeth Vesey, 1715–1791. Newcastle-on-Tyne, England: W.H. Robinson. OL 243207M.
- Deane, Seamus (2002). The Field Day anthology of Irish writing. NYU Press. ISBN 0-8147-9907-8. Collection of Elizabeth Vesey's letters.
- Mary Hamilton, afterwards Mrs John Dickenson, at court and at home: from letters and diaries, 1756 to 1816, ed. E. Anson and F. Anson (1925)
