= Shepherd of Salisbury Plain =

Character in a story by Hannah More

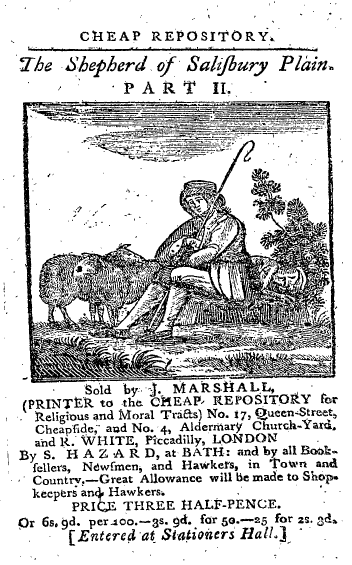
The Shepherd of Salisbury Plain

Shepherd of Salisbury Plain (1795) is the name of the hero, a shepherd of the name of Saunders, in a tract written by Hannah More, characterised by homely wisdom and simple piety. It was satirised, renamed The Washerwoman of Finchley Common, by William Thackeray in his novel Vanity Fair.
