= Wood Norton, Norfolk =

Village in Norfolk, England

Coordinates: 52.81109°N 0.98387°E

Wood Norton
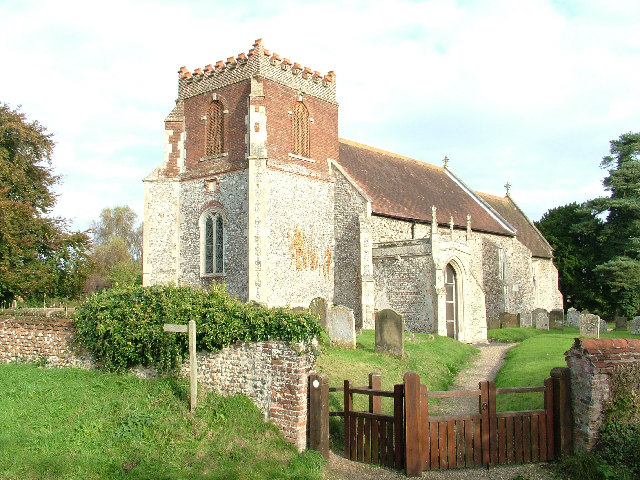
- All Saints, Wood Norton

- Location within Norfolk
- Area: 6.99 km^{2} (2.70 sq mi)
- Population: 217 (2011)
  - Density: 31/km^{2} (80/sq mi)
- OS grid reference: TG012279
- Civil parish: Wood Norton
- District: North Norfolk
- Shire county: Norfolk
- Region: East
- Country: England
- Sovereign state: United Kingdom
- Post town: DEREHAM
- Postcode district: NR20
- Police: Norfolk
- Fire: Norfolk
- Ambulance: East of England
- UK Parliament: Broadland and Fakenham

Wood Norton is a village and civil parish in the English county of Norfolk. It is located 6 mi (9.7 km) east of Fakenham and 19 mi (31 km) north-west of Norwich.

The village's name means "North farm/settlement". "Wood" distinguishes it from Pudding Norton.

The civil parish has an area of 6.99 km^{2} (2.70 sq mi) and in the 2001 census had a population of 221 in 94 households, reducing slightly to 217 at the 2011 Census. For the purposes of local government, the parish falls within the district of North Norfolk. For Westminster elections to the House of Commons, Wood Norton lies within the Broadland constituency.

== People ==
The original Blue Stocking, Benjamin Stillingfleet was born here where his father Edward Stillingfleet was rector.
