= Benjamin Stillingfleet =

English botanist, polymath and author (1702–1771)

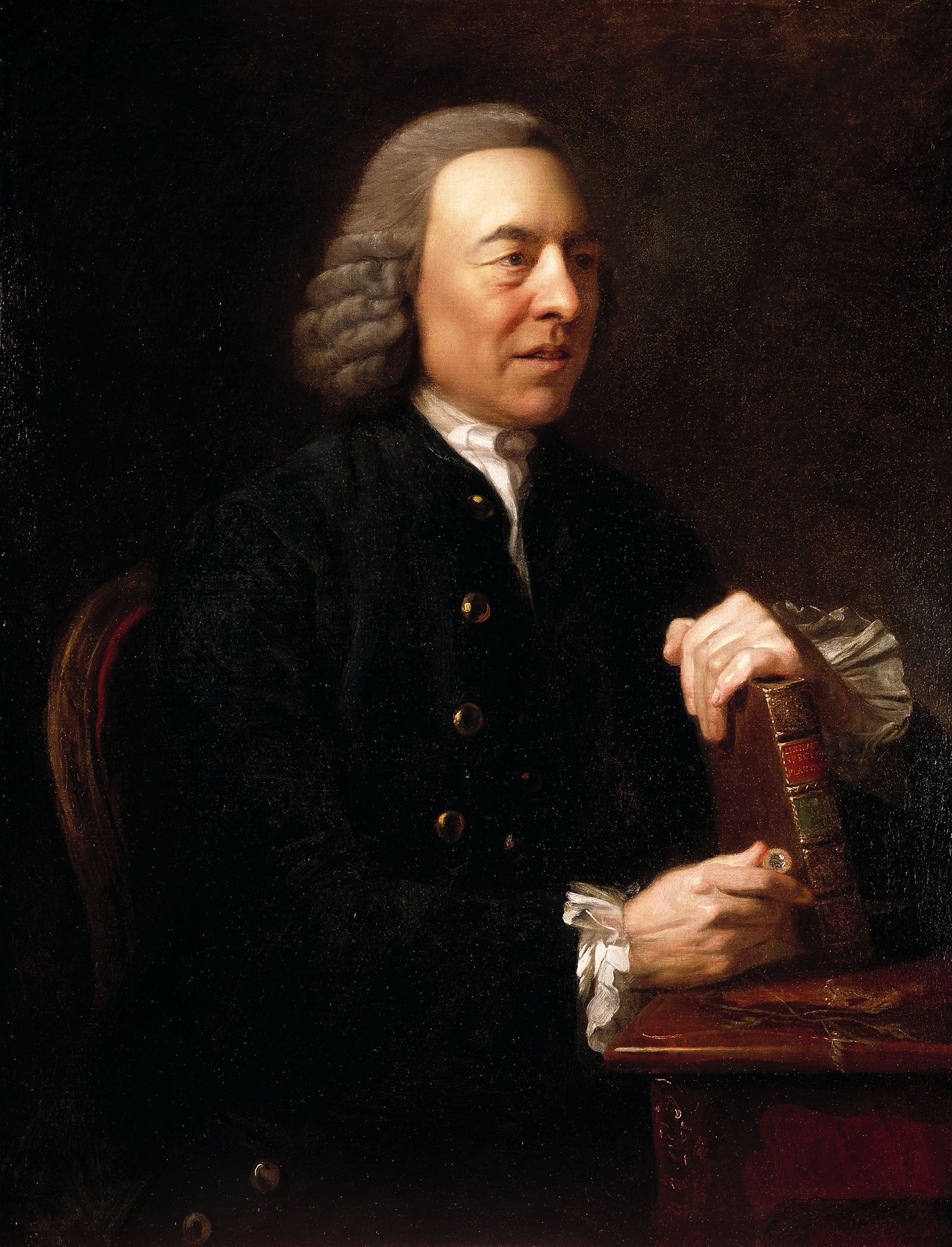
- Stillingfleet by Johann Zoffany, RA
- Born: 1702; Wood Norton, Norfolk, England
- Died: 15 December 1771 (aged 68–69); Piccadilly, England
- Resting place: St James's Church, Piccadilly
- Occupation: Author
- Known for: the source of the phrase Blue Stocking

Benjamin Stillingfleet (1702–1771) was an English botanist, polymath, and writer. He was a member of a group of women intellectuals and the term "blue stocking" was based on his attire.

== Life ==
Benjamin Stillingfleet was born in 1702 in Wood Norton, Norfolk to Mary Ann and Edward Stillingfleet. He was one of four children, and the only son. His grandfather, Edward Stillingfleet, had died in 1699, but left no money to Benjamin's father as he disapproved of his father's opinions and his marriage.

Stillingfleet was educated at Norwich School and excelled at classical languages. He was invited to Trinity College, Cambridge in 1720 at the request of the Master of the college Richard Bentley. Stillingfleet obtained a B.A. in 1723, but his application to become a Fellow at the college was rejected. This was in part due to the influence of Bentley, who is reported to have said that "Stillingfleet was too fine a gentleman to be buried within the walls of a college." He went on to serve as a tutor to his relative William Windham at Felbrigg Hall for 13 years, in part to alleviate his financial struggles. He also accompanied Windham on the Grand Tour. Whilst in Switzerland, the duo organised a series of pantomimes using other tourists as cast helpers and audience. Stillingfleet was in charge of the music and the scenery. This group was known as the "Common Room." During the summers the same group would set out on scientific explorations to find the undocumented glaciers of the Alps.

After their return to England in 1742, Stillingfleet, now out of work, was awarded a pension of 100 pounds per year for the next seven years by the Windham family. Windham went on to become a Fellow of the Royal Society in 1744 based on the explorations that he and Stillingfleet had made of glaciers in Switzerland, as well as for his mathematical abilities which Stillingfleet had tutored.

In his later years, Stillingfleet devoted himself to the studies of botany and music. In 1759, he published Miscellaneous Tracts, a botanical text which helped popularise the Linnaean system of classification. In 1761 Stillingfleet was lauded for his contribution to William Hudson's Flora Anglica, another botanical text. Stillingfleet also published a Calendar of Flora in 1755, based on the observations of Theophrastus, an early formalization of the study of plant phenology and based on Linnaeus' promotion of the idea of natural calendars.

In the study of music, he published a translated edition of Giuseppe Tartini's work on music theory, and wrote the libretto for the opera Paradise Lost: An Oratorio. He planned to publish an edition of Paradise Lost, but Stillingfleet gave up the project after Thomas Newton's 1749 edition was published.

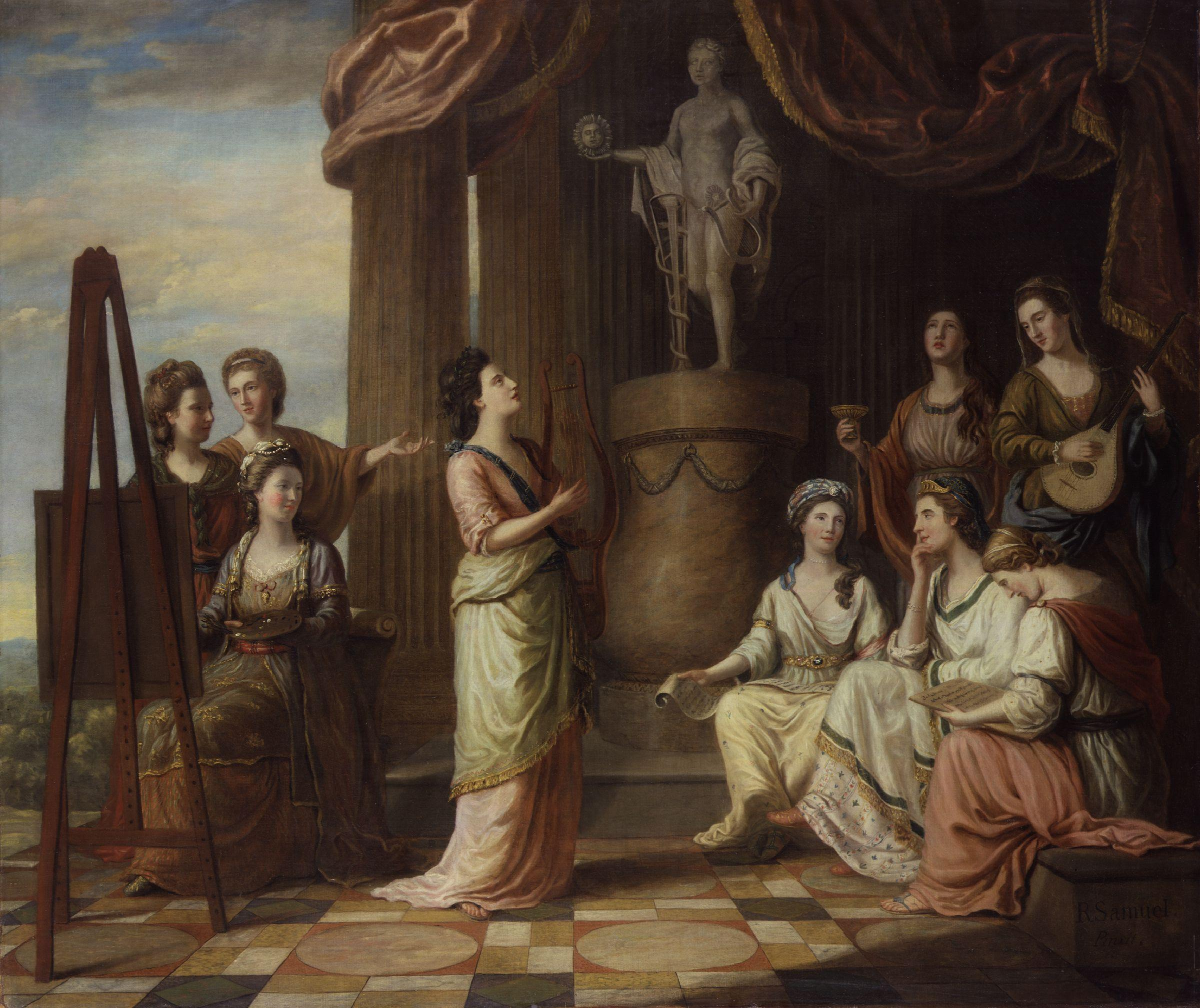
Portraits in the Characters of the Muses in the Temple of Apollo by Richard Samuel, 1778, include Elizabeth Carter, Angelica Kauffman, Anna Laetitia Barbauld, Catharine Macaulay, Elizabeth Montagu, Elizabeth Griffith, Hannah More, Elizabeth Ann Sheridan and Charlotte Lennox. Use a cursor to see who is who.

In the early 1750s, an intellectual society was formed by Elizabeth Montagu as part of the Blue Stocking Society movement. The society was noted for encouraging conversation over card playing. They invited various people to attend including Anna Laetitia Barbauld, Catharine Macaulay, Elizabeth Griffith, Hannah More, Elizabeth Ann Linley, Charlotte Lennox and Stillingfleet. One story tells that Stillingfleet was not rich enough to have the proper formal dress, which included black silk stockings, and so he attended the society's meetings in everyday blue worsted stockings. James Boswell records that during a period of poor conversation when Stillingfleet was absent, it was remarked that they were "nowhere without blue stockings." The term bluestocking came to refer to the informal quality of the gatherings and the emphasis on conversation over fashion. Later, it came to refer to a member of a bluestocking society.

In his Letter from Mr. Stillingfleet to Mr. Windham on his coming on age, Stillingfleet appears apologetic towards Christianity. Stillingfleet died at his lodgings in Piccadilly and his papers were burnt following his own instructions. He left his estate to his one remaining sister. A monument was erected only after some years to his memory at the nearby St James's Church, Piccadilly by his nephew.

== Legacy ==
Stillingfleet was a populariser of the influential Linnaean taxonomy.

The first surviving use of the epithet bluestocking is in reference to Stillingfleet. James Boswell theorized that his habit of wearing blue stockings to intellectual meetings gave rise to the name Blue Stockings Society. This phrase is the origin of the word bluestocking, a pejorative epithet for a learned or intellectual woman. The word by loan translation is also used in German as Blaustrumpf, in Dutch as blauwkous and in French as bas-bleu. The term was also borrowed in Japanese as seito.

== Works ==
- Miscellaneous Tracts Relating to Natural History, Husbandry and Physick (1759)
- Paradise Lost: An Oratorio (1760) words by Stillingfleet, music by John Christopher Smith
- Principles and Power of Harmony, (1771) – translation
- Literary life and select works of Benjamin Stillingfleet, (1811)
