= Compagnie della Calza =

Venetian theatrical groups known for feasts, games, and colorful hosiery

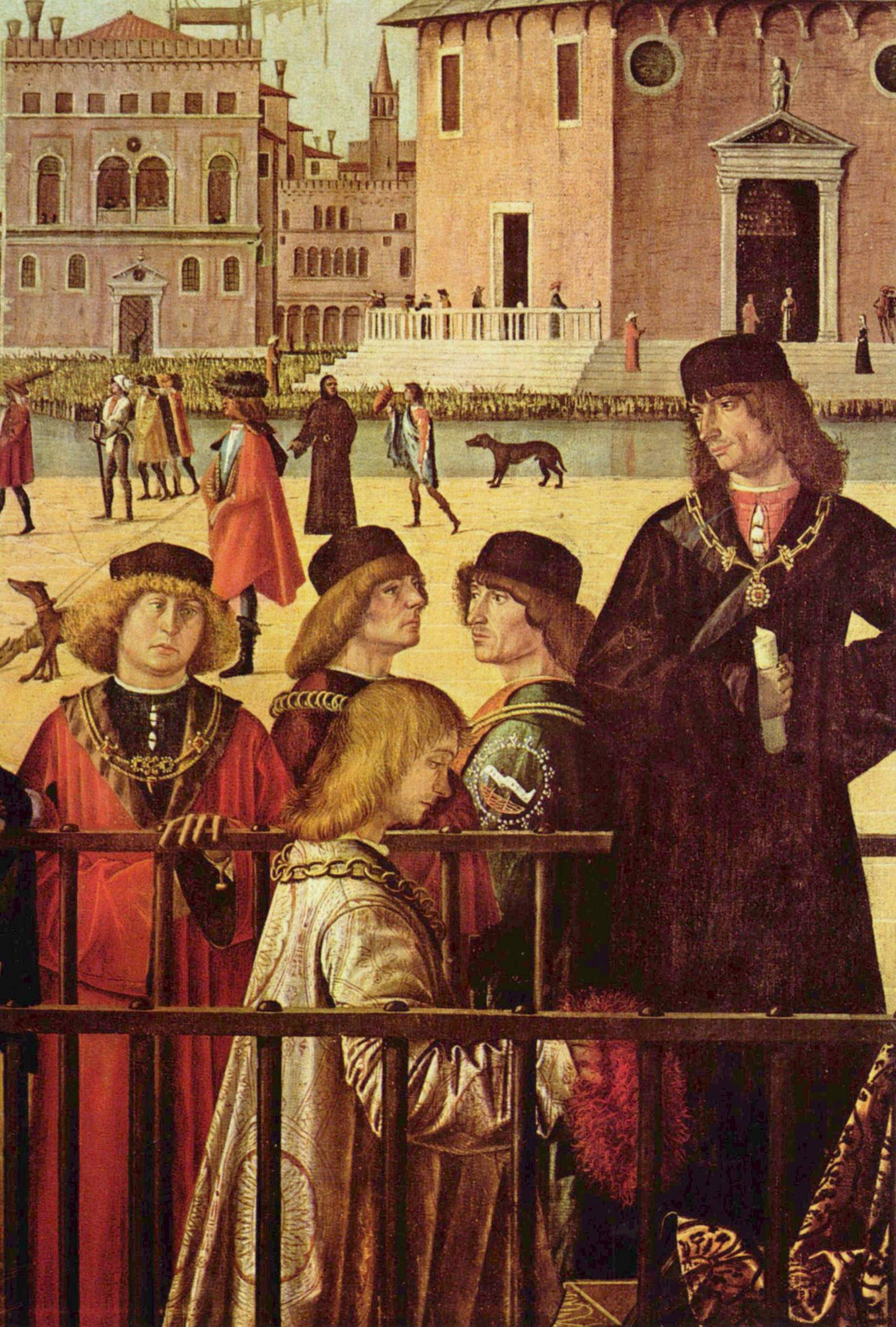
The Arrival of the English Ambassadors by Carpaccio (1495) showing a member of the calza at centre with his company's badge

The Compagnie della Calza were theatrical associations in Venice in the 15th and 16th centuries. The members wore distinctive hosiery which gave them their name (calza means sock in Italian) and met to arrange entertainments such as feasts and games.

They were founded around the mid 15th century in Venice where they organised the spettacoli cittadin (spectacles of the citizens). At the annual Carnival of Venice, they arranged a series of performances for the Venetian nobility for which famous jesters of the time were hired. They also produced plays by famous playwrights such as Angelo Beolco and Pietro Aretino. They subsequently divided into separate companies. Some were named after virtues, such as the Floridi, the Uniti or the Concordi while others were named after guilds such as the Ortolani (greengrocers) and the Zardinieri (gardeners). They distinguished themselves by the colour of their stockings and embroidery with the name or initials of the company.

Among the principal spectacles promoted by the companies were the momaria — masked processions held along the canals — boat races, mock naval battles and theatrical performances held on floating theatres. During the festa della Sensa, which celebrated the marriage of the city to the sea, elaborate rituals were performed with foreign ambassadors and dignitaries in attendance.

Accounts of the companies appear in the diaries of Marino Sanuto the Younger.
