= Edward Stillingfleet (physician) =

British physician

Edward Stillingfleet (1660?–1708) was an English physician and clergyman.

== Life ==
He was the eldest son of Edward Stillingfleet, bishop of Worcester, educated at St Paul's School. He was a Lady Margaret scholar of St. John's College, Cambridge, matriculating 1678, graduating B.A. in 1682, M.A. in 1685, and M.D. in 1692.

He was elected Fellow of the Royal Society in 1688, and Gresham Professor of Physic from 1689 to 1692. Subsequently, he practised as a doctor at King's Lynn, married against the bishop's wishes, got into debt, and further offended his father by his Jacobite opinions. When he was ordained, however, the bishop obtained for him the rectory of Newington Butts, which he exchanged in 1698 for the rectory of Wood Norton and Swanton, Norfolk.

The bishop died in 1699, leaving nothing to his son, and accordingly, on the death of the latter in 1708, his widow was in straitened circumstances. Besides Benjamin Stillingfleet the naturalist, she had three daughters, of whom the eldest, Elizabeth, afterwards married John Locker, and she herself afterwards married a Mr. Dunch.
