= Frances Boscawen =

English literary hostess

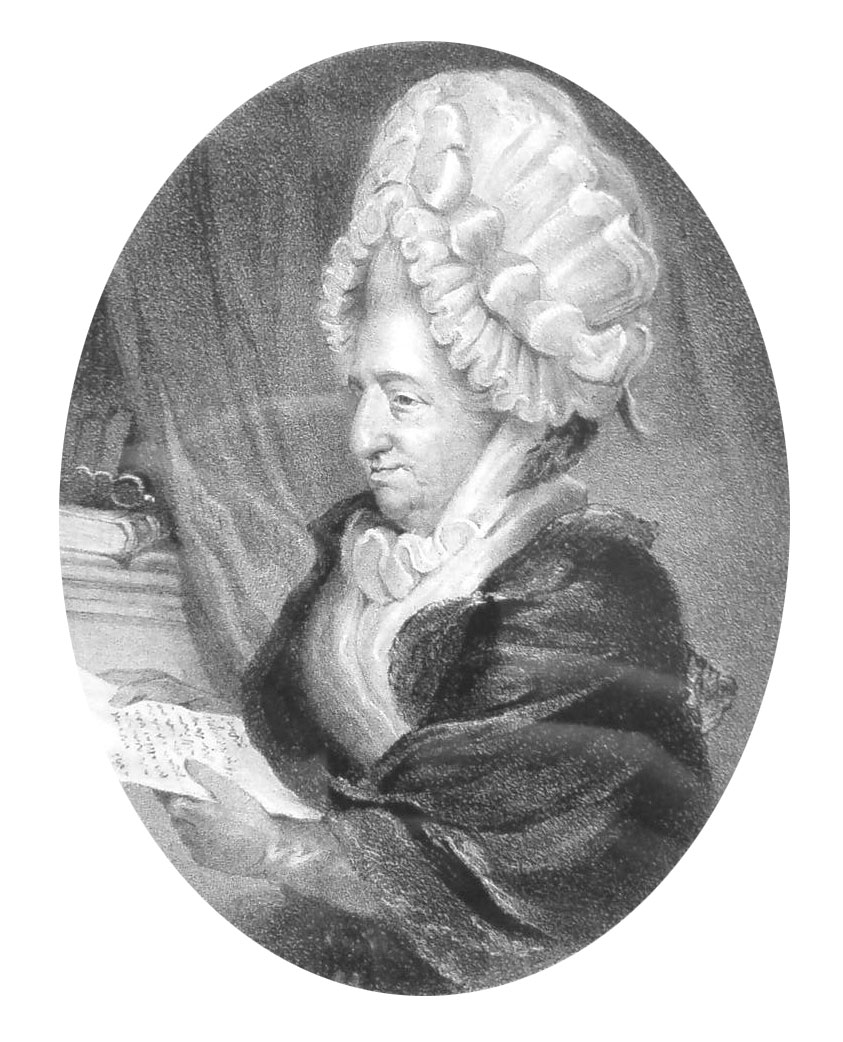
The Hon. Mrs Frances Evelyn Boscawen (née Glanville, 23 Jul 1719 – 26 Feb 1805)

Frances Evelyn "Fanny" Boscawen (née Glanville; 23 July 1719 – 26 February 1805) was an English literary hostess, correspondent and member of the Blue Stockings Society. She was born Frances Evelyn Glanville on 23 July 1719 at St Clere, Kemsing, Kent. In 1742 she married Admiral The Hon. Edward Boscawen (1711–1761). When his navy work took him away from home, his wife would send him passages from her journal, some of which were later published.

== Family ==
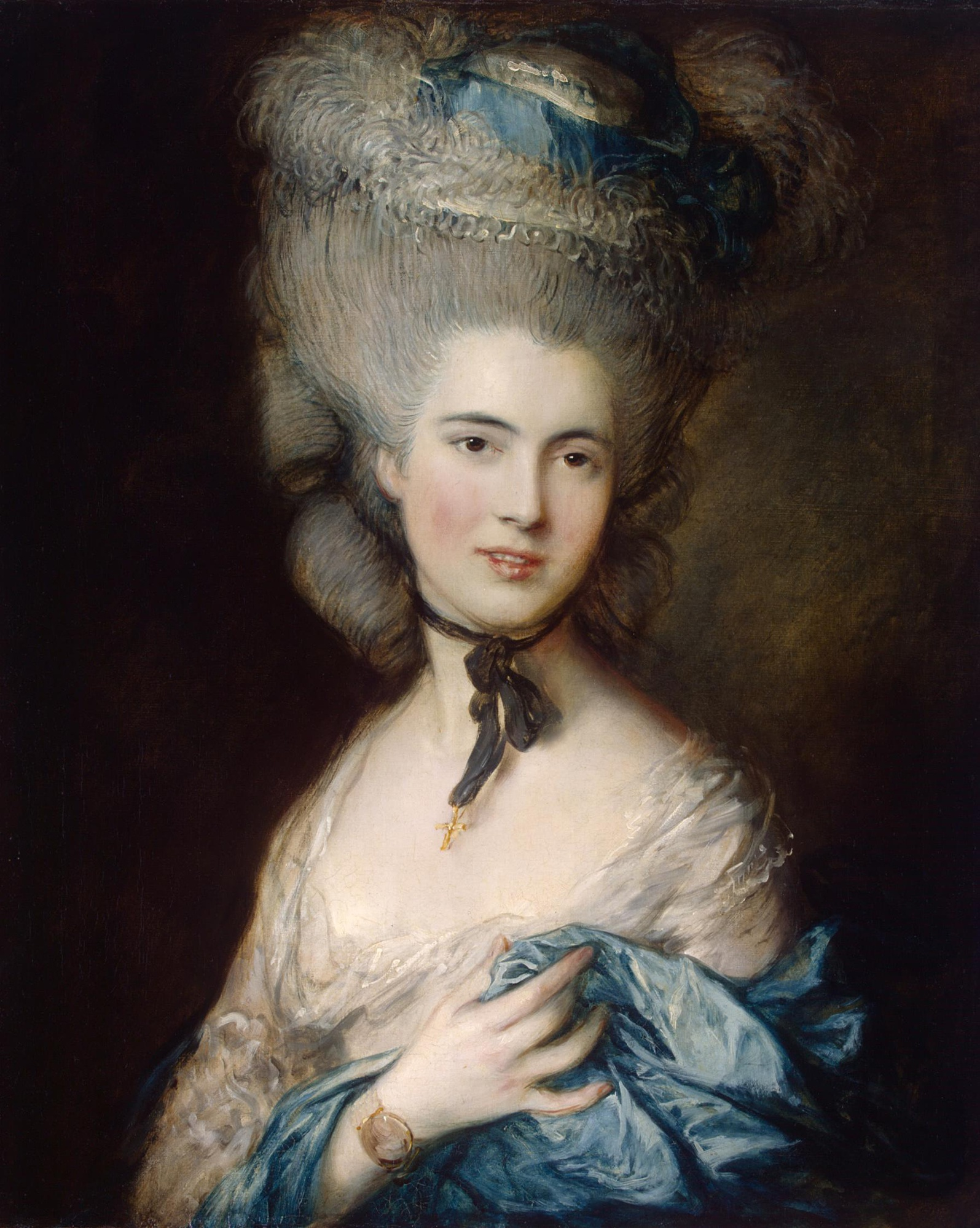
Her daughter Elizabeth, Duchess of Beaufort by Gainsborough. c. 1770s - early 1780s

Their children were:

- Edward Hugh Boscawen (13 September 1744 – 1774)
- Frances Boscawen (7 March 1746 – 14 July 1801); she married 5 July 1773, aged 27, Admiral Hon. John Leveson-Gower (11 July 1740 - 28 August 1792), younger son of John Leveson-Gower, 1st Earl Gower and half-brother of the 1st Marquess of Stafford; they had five sons and two daughters. The heirs-male descending from this marriage are in remainder to the earldom of Gower and the baronetcy only.
- Elizabeth, later Duchess of Beaufort (28 May 1747 Falmouth, Cornwall – 15 June 1828 Stoke Gifford, Gloucestershire); she married on 2 January 1766 the Duke of Beaufort at St George's Church, Hanover Square, London. and had eight sons and four daughters by him. She may have been the "Lady in Blue" painted by Thomas Gainsborough.
- William Glanville Boscawen (11 August 1749 – 21 April 1769), died aged 19.
- George Boscawen, 3rd Viscount Falmouth, born 6 May 1758, succeeded his uncle as Viscount Falmouth in 1782. His son was Edward Boscawen, 4th Viscount Falmouth. All the future Viscounts Falmouth and two earls Falmouth are descended from his two sons.

=== Friendships and influence ===
Frances' family were aristocratic and members of the court of King George II and King George III. Her son-in-law, Henry Somerset, 5th Duke of Beaufort was Master of the Horse to Queen Charlotte and her father-in-law Hugh Boscawen, 1st Viscount Falmouth was the brother-in-law of Sir Philip Meadows, Knight Marshal of the King's household whose daughter, Mary, was Maid of Honour to Queen Caroline.

After Boscawen's death in 1761, Frances returned to her London house at 14 South Audley St, where she became an important hostess of Bluestocking meetings. Her numerous guests included Elizabeth Montagu, Horace Walpole, Dr Johnson, Mrs Delany, Anna Letitia Barbauld, James Boswell, Joshua Reynolds - who had painted her husband's portrait - Frances Reynolds, Elizabeth Carter, and later Hannah More, who described her as "sage" (wise) in her 1782 poem The Bas Bleu, or, Conversation, published in 1784. Indeed, Frances had shown wisdom when expressing concern over the notoriously troubled marriage of Georgiana, Duchess of Devonshire. Like Frances, the Duchess was a Whig supporter and an associate of the Blue Stockings circle. Frances' widowhood inspired Edward Young's 1761 poem Resignation. She "was widely known in literary London as a model letter-writer and conversationalist, prized for her wit, elegance, and warm heart," according to a present-day scholar.

Frances' influence over King George III was notable, persuading him to employ artist John Opie to paint a portrait of Mrs Delany which hung in the royal bedchamber in a frame designed by Horace Walpole. Opie's wife, Amelia, also associated with the fashionable Blue Stockings Society as did Frances' daughter, Elizabeth, Duchess of Beaufort (née Boscawen) (1747-1828).

== Death ==
Frances died at home in London on 26 February 1805.
