= Blue Stockings Society =

Social and educational movement

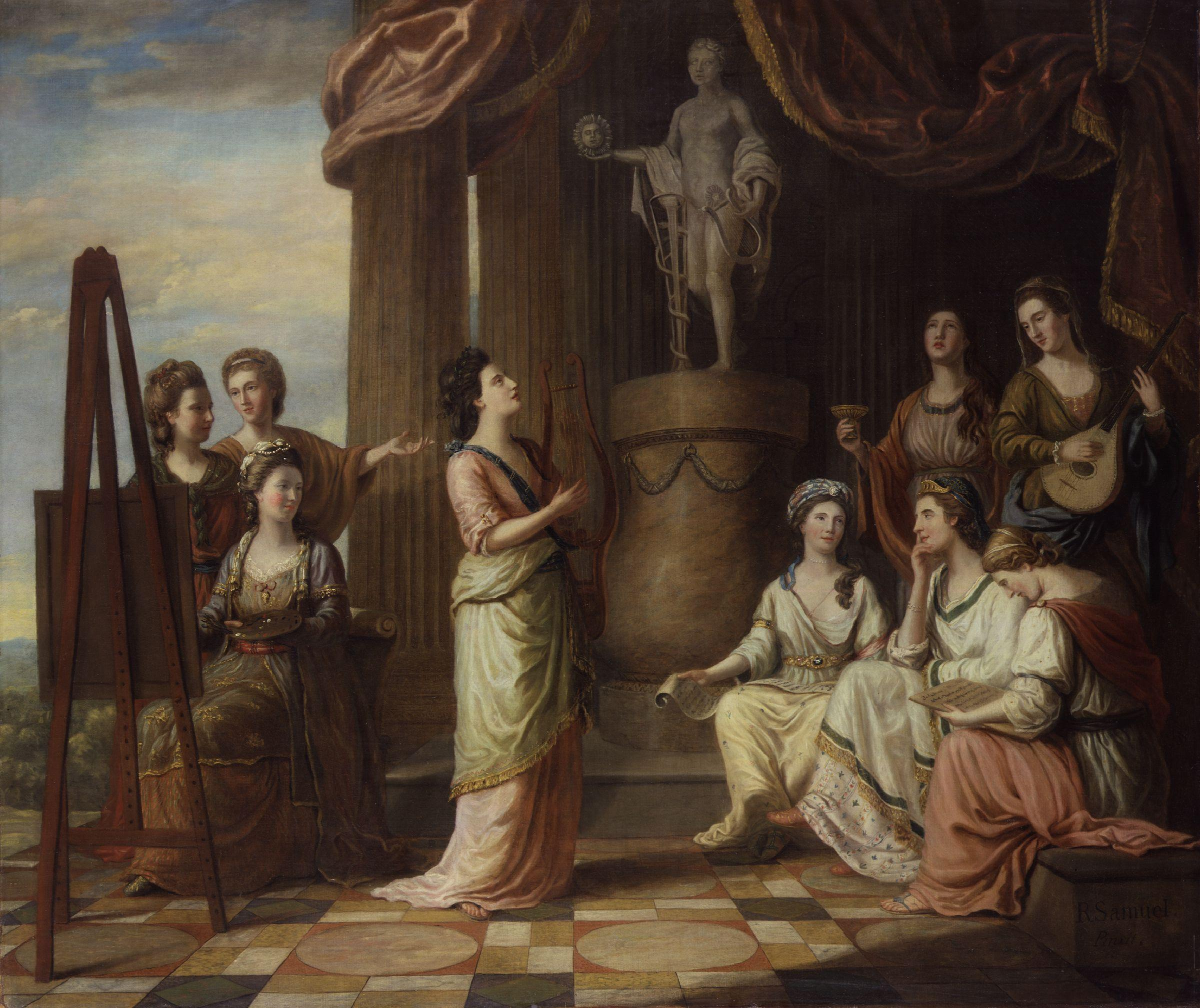
1778 painting of the society's members, including Anna Letitia Barbauld, Elizabeth Carter, Elizabeth Griffith, Angelica Kauffmann, Charlotte Lennox, Catharine Macaulay, Elizabeth Montagu, Hannah More and Elizabeth Ann Sheridan

The Blue Stockings Society was an informal women's social and educational movement in England in the mid-18th century that emphasised education and mutual cooperation. It was founded in the early 1750s by Elizabeth Montagu, Elizabeth Vesey and others as a literary discussion group, a step away from traditional, non-intellectual women's activities. Both men and women were invited to attend, including the botanist, translator and publisher Benjamin Stillingfleet, who, due to his financial standing, did not dress for the occasion as formally as was customary and deemed "proper", in consequence appearing in everyday, blue worsted stockings.

The society gave rise to the term "bluestocking", referred to the informal quality of the gatherings and the emphasis on conversation rather than fashion, and, by the 1770s, came to describe learned women in general.

== History ==
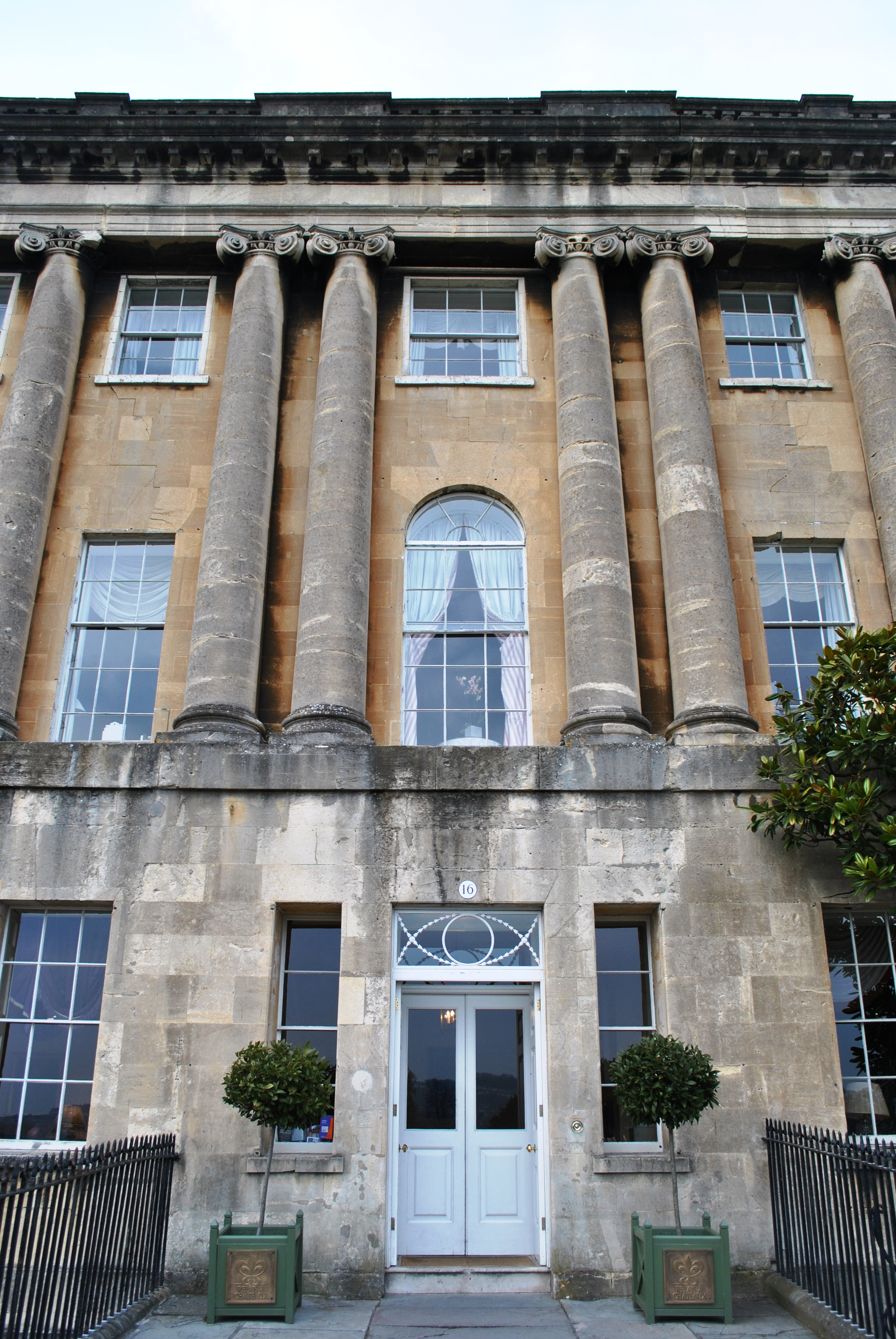
The centre house, 16 Royal Crescent, Bath, was used as a residence and to host Blue Stockings Society events by Elizabeth Montagu

The Blue Stockings Society of England emerged in about 1750, and waned in popularity at the end of the 18th century. It was a loose organization of privileged women with an interest in education to gather together to discuss literature while inviting educated men to participate. Led and hosted by Elizabeth Montagu and Elizabeth Vesey, the women involved in this group generally had more education and fewer children than most Englishwomen of the time. During this period, only men attended universities, whereas women were expected to master skills such as needlework and knitting: it was considered “unbecoming” for them to know Greek or Latin, almost immodest for them to be authors, and certainly indiscreet to admit the fact. Anna Laetitia Barbauld, a member of the club, was merely the echo of popular sentiment, contrary to the general opinion of the Blue Stockings, when she protested that women did not want colleges. She wrote, “The best way for a woman to acquire knowledge is from conversation with a father, or brother, or friend.” However, by the early 1800s, this sentiment had changed, and it was more common to question “why a woman of forty should be more ignorant than a boy of twelve”, which coincided with the waning of the Blue Stockings’ popularity.

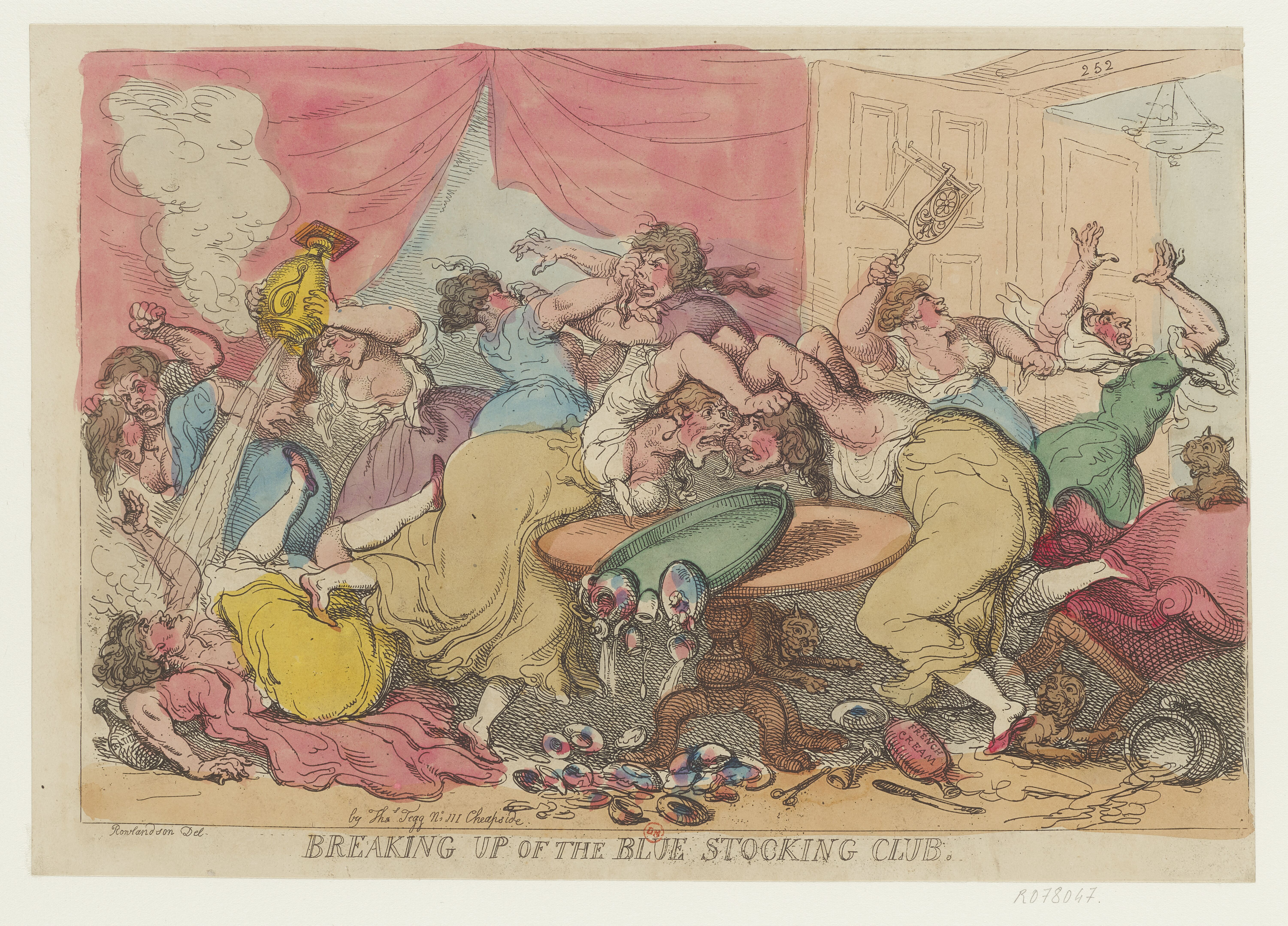
1815 caricature of the Blue Stockings Society by Thomas Rowlandson

The group has been described by many historians and authors (such as Jeanine Dobbs) as “having preserved and advanced feminism” via the advocacy for women's education and the social complaints regarding women's status and lifestyle in their society, as seen and exemplified in the writings of the Blue Stockings women themselves:

In a woman's education little but outward accomplishments is regarded ... sure the men are very imprudent to endeavor to make fools of those to whom they so much trust their honour and fortune, but it is in the nature of mankind to hazard their peace to secure power, and they know fools make the best slaves.

— Elizabeth Montagu 1743

The name “Blue Stockings Society” and its origins are highly disputed among historians. There are scattered early references to bluestockings including in the 15th-century Della Calza society in Venice, John Amos Comenius in 1638, and the 17th-century Covenanters in Scotland. The society's name perhaps derived from the European fashion in the mid–18th century in which black stockings were worn in formal dress, while blue stockings were daytime or more casual wear, emphasizing the informal nature of the club’s gatherings. Blue stockings were furthermore very fashionable for women in Paris at the time. Alternatively, many historians claim the term for the society was coined when Elizabeth Vesey first advised Benjamin Stillingfleet, the aforementioned learned gentleman who had distanced himself from higher society and did not have clothes suitable for an evening party, to “come in [his] blue stockings”. Stillingfleet became a frequent and popular guest at the Blue Stockings Society gatherings.

There are several sources linking Stillingfleet to the blue stocking appellation. Samuel Torriano uses the sobriquet blew stocking for Stillingfleet in 1756 and Elizabeth Montagu refers to his blue stockings in 1757. This letter also suggests that by that time he may have stopped attending her soirees. He died in 1771 and in 1791 James Boswell had to remind his friends of the origin of the Blue-Stocking Club name and the role of Stillingfleet. Later Admiral Boscawen and Mrs Vesey. would separately be credited with the first mention of the name.

== Purpose ==
The Blue Stockings Society had no membership formalities nor fees, and conducted small to large gatherings in which talk of politics was prohibited but literature and the arts were of main discussion. Learned women with interest in these educational discussions attended as well as invited male guests. Tea, biscuits and other light refreshments would be served to guests by the hostesses.

The New York Times published an article on 17 April 1881, a century after the events in question, which describes the Blue Stockings Society as a women's movement combatting the “vice” and “passion” of gambling, the main form of entertainment at higher society parties. “Instead however, of following the fashion, Mrs. Montagu and a few friends Mrs. Boscawen and Mrs. Vesey, who like herself, were untainted by this wolfish passion, resolved to make a stand against the universal tyranny of a custom which absorbed the life and leisure of the rich to the exclusion of all intellectual enjoyment... and to found a society in which conversation should supersede cards.”

Many of the Blue Stockings women supported each other in intellectual endeavours such as reading, artwork, and writing. Many also published literature. For example, author Elizabeth Carter (1717–1806) was a Blue Stockings Society advocate and member who published essays and poetry, and translated the works of Epictetus. Literature professor Anna Miegon compiled biographical sketches of these women in her Biographical Sketches of Principal Bluestocking Women.

== Members (partial list) ==
- Anna Laetitia Barbauld
- James Beattie
- Frances Boscawen
- Henrietta Maria Bowdler
- Edmund Burke
- Frances Burney
- Elizabeth Carter
- Margaret Bentinck, Duchess of Portland
- Hester Chapone
- Mary Delany
- Sarah Fielding
- David Garrick
- Samuel Johnson
- Catharine Macaulay
- Elizabeth Montagu
- Hannah More
- Amelia Opie
- William Pulteney, 1st Earl of Bath
- Clara Reeve
- Joshua Reynolds
- Sarah Scott
- Catherine Talbot
- Hester Thrale
- Elizabeth Vesey
- Horace Walpole
- Anna Williams
- Mary Wollstonecraft

== Modern play ==
Ladies, a play by Kit Steinkellner, is a fictional account of four members of the Blue Stockings Society, and their impact on modern-day feminism. It had its world première at Boston Court Pasadena in Pasadena, California in June 2019, with direction by Jessica Kubzansky.
