= Hannah More =

English poet and playwright (1745–1833)

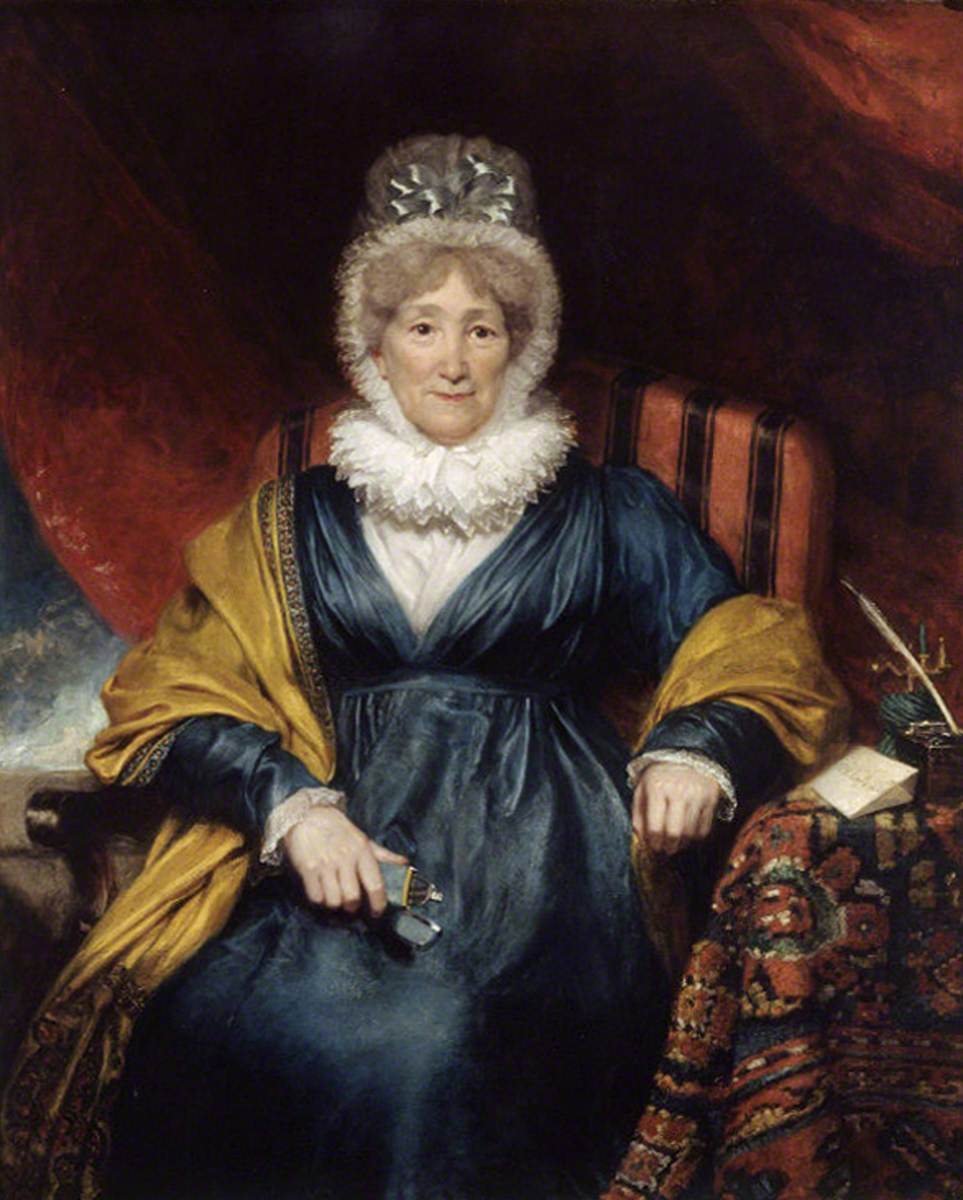
- Portrait by Henry William Pickersgill, 1821
- Born: 2 February 1745; Fishponds, Bristol
- Died: 7 September 1833 (aged 88); Clifton, Bristol
- Resting place: Wrington, Somerset
- Occupations: Poet; playwright; author; educator
- Known for: Poetry; drama; philanthropy

Hannah More (2 February 1745 – 7 September 1833) was an English writer, philanthropist, poet and verse dramatist. She was active the circles of Samuel Johnson, Joshua Reynolds and David Garrick and wrote on moral and religious subjects. Born in Bristol, she taught at a school her father founded there and began writing plays. She became involved in the London literary elite, and she was a leading Bluestocking member. Her later plays and poetry became more evangelical. She joined the Clapham Sect, a group opposing the Atlantic slave trade.

In the 1790s, More wrote Cheap Repository Tracts on moral, religious and political topics, to distribute to the literate poor (as a retort to Thomas Paine's Rights of Man). Meanwhile, she broadened her links with schools she and her sister Martha had founded in rural Somerset. These curbed their teaching of the poor, allowing limited reading but no writing. More was noted for her political conservatism, being described as an anti-feminist, a counter-revolutionary, or a conservative feminist.

== Early life ==
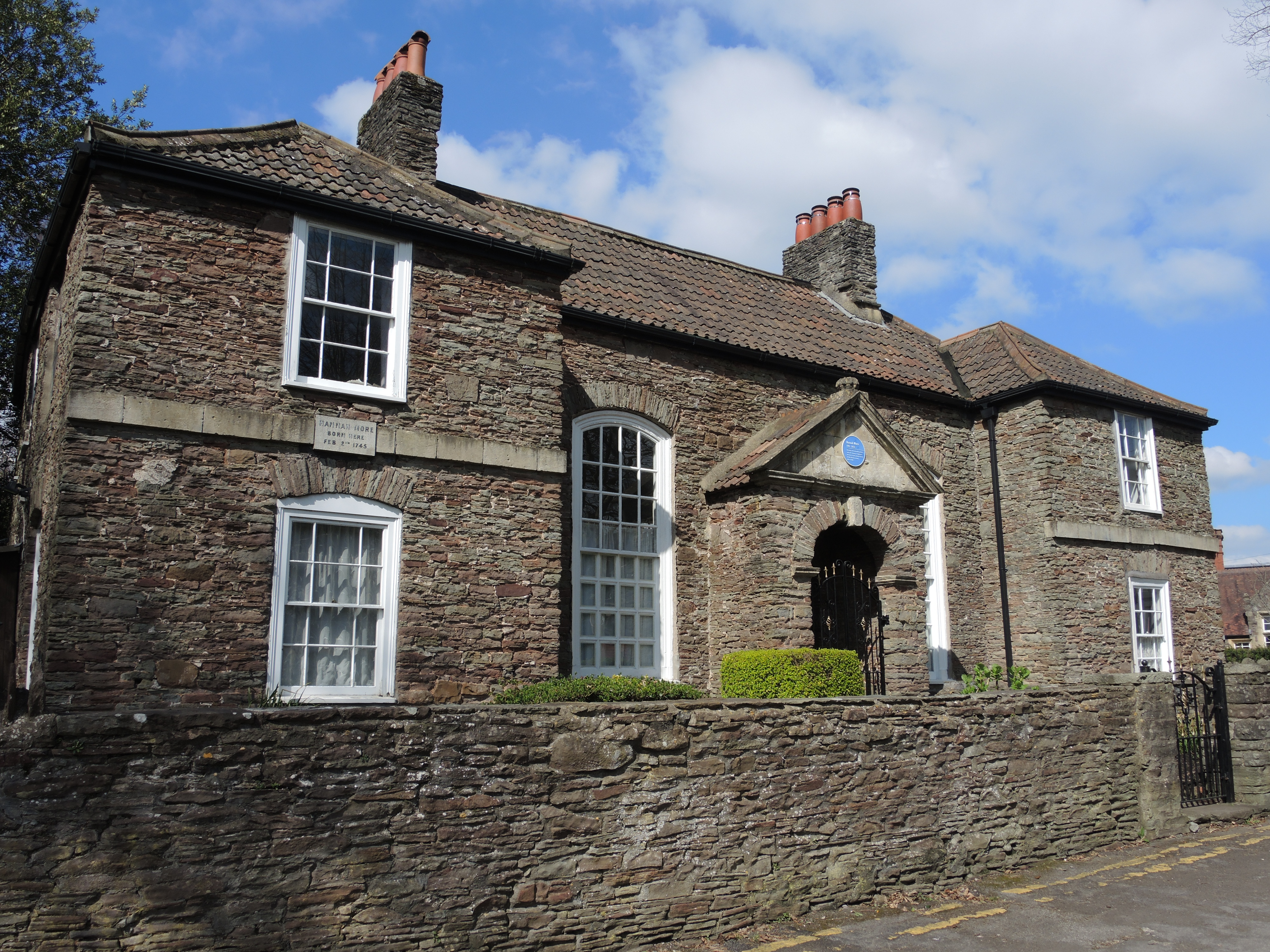
The birthplace of Hannah More on Manor Road, Fishponds

Hannah More was born on 2 February 1745 at Fishponds in the parish of Stapleton, near Bristol. She was the fourth of five daughters of Jacob More (1700–1783), a schoolmaster from a strong Presbyterian family in Harleston, Norfolk, who had joined the Church of England. He sought to pursue a clerical career, but after losing a lawsuit over an estate which he had hoped to inherit, Jacob moved to Bristol. There he became an excise officer and later taught at the Fishponds free school.

The sisters were first educated by their father, learning Latin and mathematics. Hannah was also taught by elder sisters, through whom she learned French, which she improved conversationally by spending time with French prisoners of war in Frenchay during the Seven Years' War. She was an assiduous, discerning student. Family tradition has it that she began writing at an early age.

In 1758, Jacob established a girls' boarding school at Trinity Street, Bristol, for the elder sisters, Mary and Elizabeth, to run, while he and his wife moved to Stony Hill in the city to open a school for boys. Hannah More became a pupil in the girls' school when she was 12 years old and taught there in early adulthood.

In 1767, More gave up her share in the school on becoming engaged to William Turner of the Belmont Estate, Wraxall, Somerset, whom she had met when he began teaching her cousins. After six years, the wedding had not taken place. Turner seemed reluctant to name a date and in 1773 the engagement was broken off. It seems this led More into a nervous breakdown, from which she recuperated in Uphill, near Weston-super-Mare. She was induced to accept a £200 annuity from Turner as compensation. This freed her for literary pursuits. In the winter of 1773–1774, she went to London with her sisters, Sarah and Martha – the first of many such trips at yearly intervals. Some verses she had written on David Garrick's version of King Lear led to an acquaintance with him.

She later moved to Bath, where she stayed between 1792 and 1802 on Great Pulteney Street.

== Playwright and Influential Associations ==
More's first literary effort was a pastoral play written while she was still teaching, and needed something suitable for young ladies to act. This resulted in The Search after Happiness, a verse drama in heroic couplets, with occasional rhyming song lyrics, written in 1762. It is written entirely for a cast of female actors. Although More is writing in the same style championed by John Dryden a century previous, More frequently refers to her own play as 'this little poem'. By the mid-1780s, over 10,000 copies of this had been sold.

Among her literary models was Pietro Metastasio, on whose opera Attilio Regulo she based a drama, The Inflexible Captive (1774). As she wrote in the introduction, 'In this, as well as in the general conduct of the story, she [More] has followed the Italian poet Metastasio, in his opera on this subject. However, unlike her earlier pastoral, this play is written largely in blank verse iambic pentameter, with more roles for men than for women.

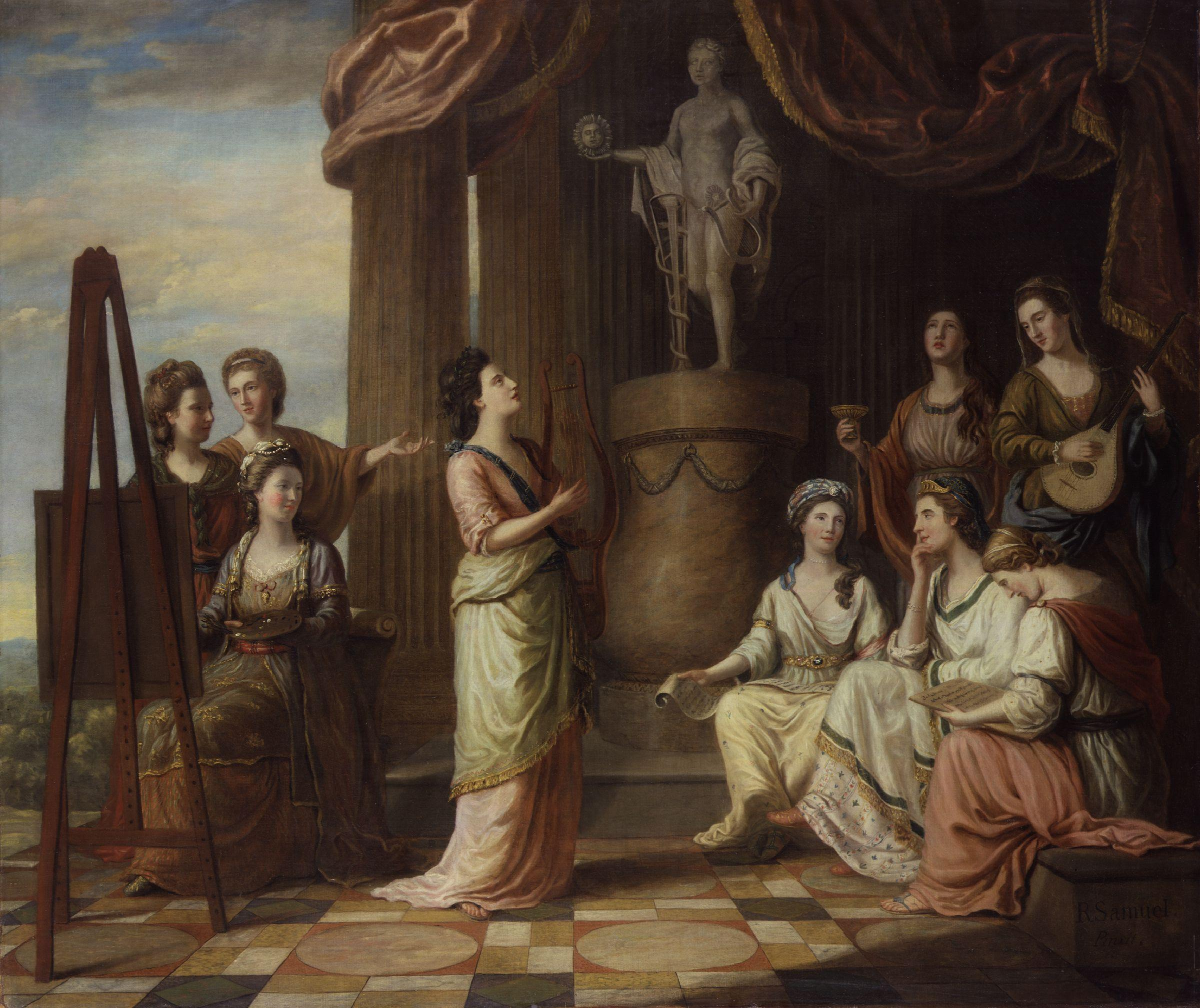
1778 painting of the Blue Stockings Society showing More standing second from right

In London, More sought to associate with the literary elite, including Samuel Johnson, Joshua Reynolds and Edmund Burke. Johnson is quoted as scolding her: "Madam, before you flatter a man so grossly to his face, you should consider whether or not your flattery is worth having." He would later be quoted as calling her "the finest versifatrix in the English language".

Garrick wrote a prologue and epilogue to Hannah More's tragedy Percy, after the Medieval warring families of Percy and Douglas. The play was a success at Covent Garden in December 1777 and revived in 1785 with Sarah Siddons at Theatre Royal, Drury Lane, for which David Garrick wrote the epilogue. A copy of Percy was found among Mozart's possessions in 1791. Percy was More's most successful play, running for twenty-one days. The play's advertisement reads:

The French Drama, founded on the famous old Story of Raoul de Coucy, suggested to the Author some Circumstances in the former part of this Tragedy.

The "French Drama" which inspired some scenes in the early part of Percy is Gabrielle de Vergy (1770) by Pierre-Laurent Buirette de Belloy. This drama went on to inspire the opera, Gabriella di Vergy (1826-1838) by Gaetano Donizetti with libretto by Andrea Leone Tottola. The story itself is derived from two French medieval legends, Le châtelain de Coucy et la dame de Fayel and Le Roman de la chastelaine de Vergy. Donizetti was one of several composers in the nineteenth century who used this source material for their operas.

Sadly, Moore became disillusioned with the theatre after the death of Garrick. Moreover, she was discouraged upon the reception of her final play, The Fatal Falsehood (1779), which was unpopular due to its dramatic and spiritual themes, as well as a lack of editing. Moreover, More was accused of plagiarizing the plot from Hannah Cowley's play, Albina, Countess Raimond: A Tragedy (1779).

Like all of More's plays, the dramatis personae is very small, with only six named roles. As with all of her "serious" tragedies, only the prologues and epilogues are in rhyming couplets, while the entire action is written in blank verse. Once more, More undermines her own work in the prologue, spoken by Mr. Hull:

Nor does she emulate the loftier strains

Which high heroic Tragedy maintains:

Nor conquests she, nor wars, nor triumphs sings,

Nor with rash hand o'erturns the thrones of kings [...]

The scenes of private life our author shows,

A simple story of domestic woes [...]

More became prominent in the Bluestocking group of women engaged in polite conversation and literary and intellectual pursuits. She attended the salon of Elizabeth Montagu, where she met Frances Boscawen, Elizabeth Carter, Elizabeth Vesey and Hester Chapone, some of whom would be lifelong friends. In 1782, she wrote a witty poetic celebration of her friends and circle: The Bas Bleu, or, Conversation, published in 1784. As More writes in her introduction, "The slight performance, occasioned by this little circumstance, was never intended to appear in print." The text is written without any speech prefix, and there is no dramatis personae, nevertheless, it was performed and subsequently printed, since "copies having been multiplied, far beyond the intention of the Author, she has been advised to published it, lest it should steal into the world in a state of still greater imperfection..." The text is written in rhyming couplets, generally in loose tetrameter, with occasional indentations acting as stanza breaks.

In 1781, she met Horace Walpole and corresponded with him. At Bristol she discovered the poet Ann Yearsley. When Yearsley became destitute, More raised a considerable sum of money for her benefit. Lactilla, as Yearsley was known, published Poems, on Several Occasions in 1785, earning about £600. More and Montagu held the profits in trust to protect them from Yearsley's husband. However, Ann Yearsley wished to receive the capital and made insinuations of stealing against More, forcing her to release it. These literary and social failures prompted More's withdrawal from London intellectual circles.

== Evangelical moralist ==
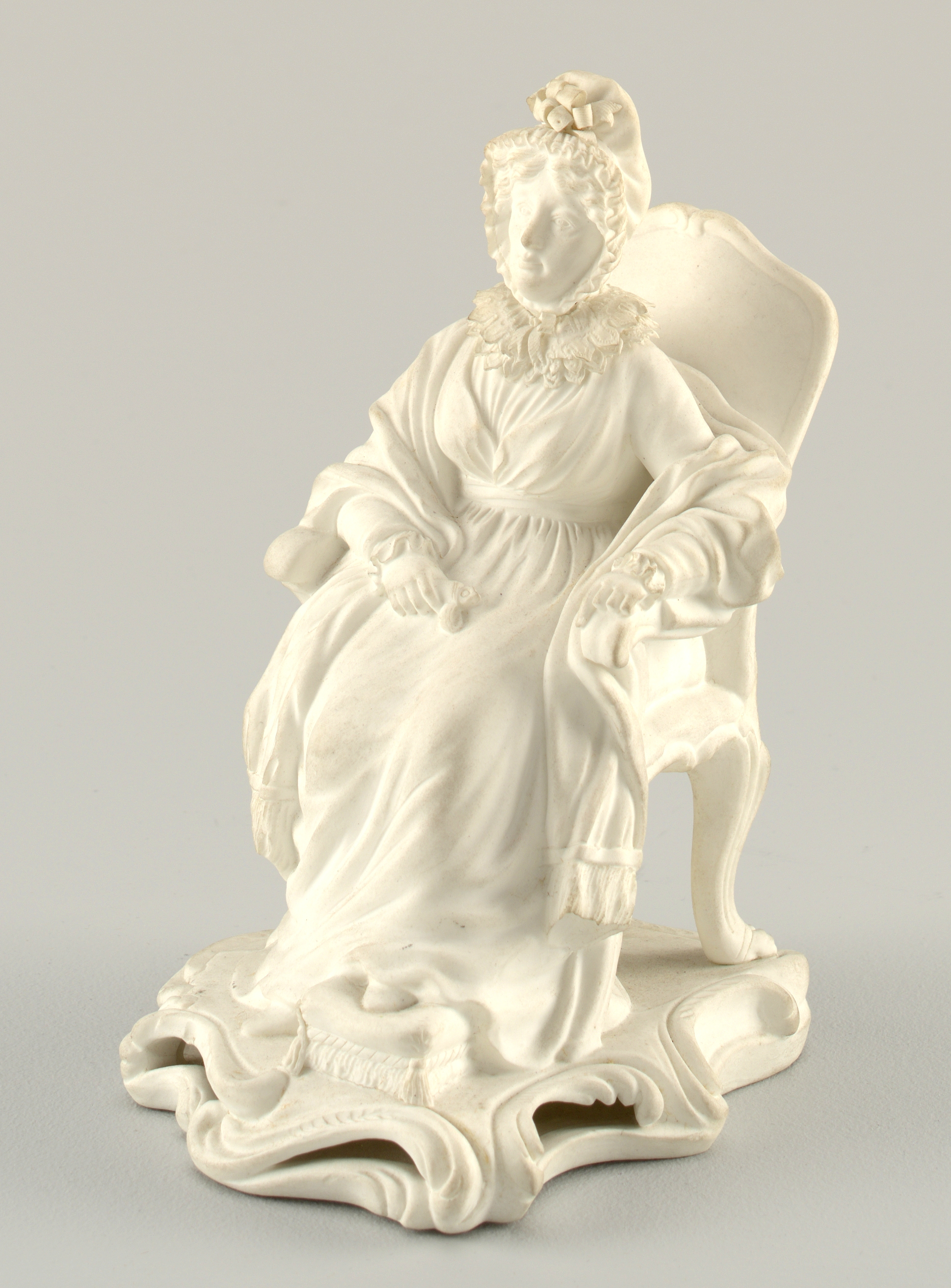
Biscuit porcelain figure by Mintons, 1830s

In the 1780s, Hannah More became a friend of James Oglethorpe, who had long been concerned with slavery as a moral issue and who was working with Granville Sharp as an early abolitionist. More published Sacred Dramas in 1782, which rapidly ran through 19 editions. These and the poems Bas-Bleu and Florio (1786) mark a gradual transition to graver views, expressed in prose in Thoughts on the Importance of the Manners of the Great to General Society (1788) and An Estimate of the Religion of the Fashionable World (1790). By this time she was close to William Wilberforce and Zachary Macaulay, sympathising with their evangelical views. Her poem Slavery appeared in 1788. For many years she was a friend of Beilby Porteus, Bishop of London and a leading abolitionist, who drew her into a group of anti-slave traders that included Wilberforce, Charles Middleton and also James Ramsay at Teston in Kent.

In 1785 More bought a house at Cowslip Green, near Wrington in northern Somerset, where she settled with her sister Martha and wrote several ethical books and tracts: Strictures on the Modern System of Female Education (1799), Hints towards Forming the Character of a Young Princess (1805), Coelebs in Search of a Wife (only nominally a story, 1809), Practical Piety (1811), Christian Morals (1813), Character of St Paul (1815) and Moral Sketches (1819). She was a rapid writer. Her work, though discursive and animated, was deficient in form. Her popularity may be explained by her originality and forceful subject-matter.

The outbreak of the French Revolution in 1789 did not worry More initially, but by 1790 she was writing, "I have conceived an utter aversion to liberty according to the present idea of it in France. What a cruel people they are!" She praised Edmund Burke's Reflections on the Revolution in France for combining "the rhetoric of ancient Gaul" and the "patriot spirit of ancient Rome" with "the deepest political sagacity". Part II of the Rights of Man, Thomas Paine's reply to Burke, appeared in 1792. The government was alarmed by its concern for the poor and call for world revolution, coupled with huge sales. Porteus visited More and asked her to write something for the lower orders to counteract Paine. This prompted a pamphlet, Village Politics (1792). More called it "as vulgar as [the] heart can wish; but it is only designed for the most vulgar class of readers." The pamphlet (published pseudonymously as by "Will Chip") consists of a dialogue in plain English between Jack Anvil, a village blacksmith, and Tom Hood, a village mason. After reading Paine, Tom Hood expresses admiration for the French Revolution to Jack Anvil and speaks in favour of a new constitution based on liberty and the "rights of man". Jack Anvil responds by praising the British constitution, saying Britain already has "the best laws in the world". He attacks French liberty as murder, French democracy as tyranny of the majority, French equality as a levelling down of social classes, French philosophy as atheism, and the "rights of man" as "battle, murder and sudden death". Tom Hood finally accepts Anvil's conclusion: "While old England is safe I'll glory in her, and pray for her; and when she is in danger I'll fight for her and die for her."

More's biographer summed up the pamphlet against Paine as "Burke for Beginners". It was well received: Porteus called it "a masterpiece of its kind, supremely excellent, greatly admired at Windsor". Frances Boscawen thought it exceeded William Paley's The British Public's Reasons for Contentment and Richard Owen Cambridge claimed "Swift could not have done it better." More's next anti-Jacobin tract, Remarks on the Speech of M. Dupont, condemned atheism in France. Its profits were passed to French Catholic priests exiled in England.

The two pamphlets attracted praise from the Association for the Discountenancing of Vice, an evangelical publishing society founded in Dublin in 1792. The membership wrote to her in June 1793 congratulating her on it and inviting her to become an honorary member. Accepting, More asked the Association to send her "two or three printed papers explaining the nature of the Association as perhaps I may use them to advantage with a friend or two, distinguished for their piety and active zeal."

=== Cheap Repository Tracts ===
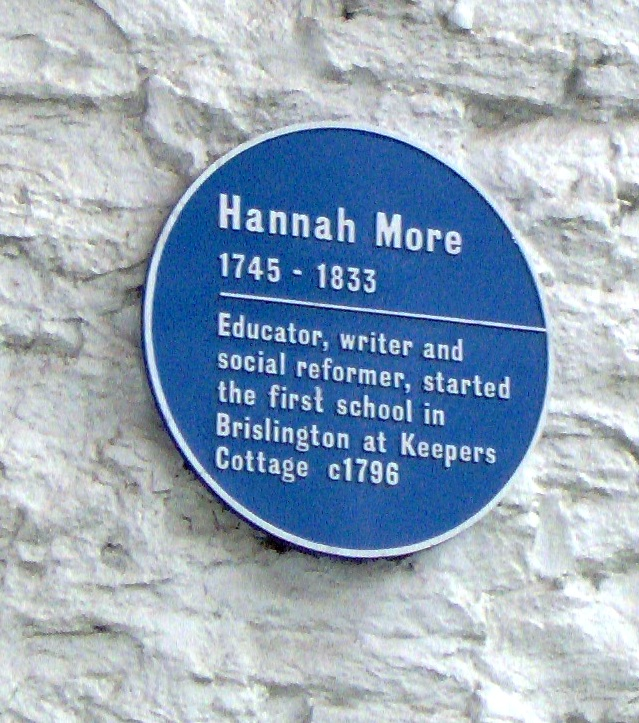
Blue plaque on the wall of Keepers Cottage, in Brislington, Bristol

In 1794, when Paine published The Age of Reason, Porteus again requested More's help in combating Paine's ideas, but she declined, being preoccupied with her charity-school work. However, by the end of the year, More, encouraged by Porteus, decided to embark on a series of Cheap Repository Tracts, three of which appeared every month from 1795 to 1798. In January 1795, More explained to Zachary Macaulay: "Vulgar and indecent penny books were always common, but speculative infidelity brought down to the pockets and capacity of the poor forms a new era in our history. This requires strong counteraction." Her scheme developed from the ideas of the Association for discountenancing vice, though written in a more "readable and entertaining a style". The tracts sold 300,000 copies in March and April 1795, 700,000 by July 1795 and over two million by March 1796. They urged the poor to rely on virtues of contentment, sobriety, humility, industry, reverence for the British Constitution, hatred of the French, and trust in God and the kindness of the gentry. Perhaps the most famous is The Shepherd of Salisbury Plain, describing a family of phenomenal frugality and contentment. This was translated into several languages. She also invited the Association for the Discountenancing of Vice to reprint her tracts in Ireland, which they did with success in more than 230 editions of 52 titles.

More was shocked by the strides made for female education in France: "They run to study philosophy, and neglect their families to be present at lectures in anatomy."

== Views on schooling for poor and for girls ==
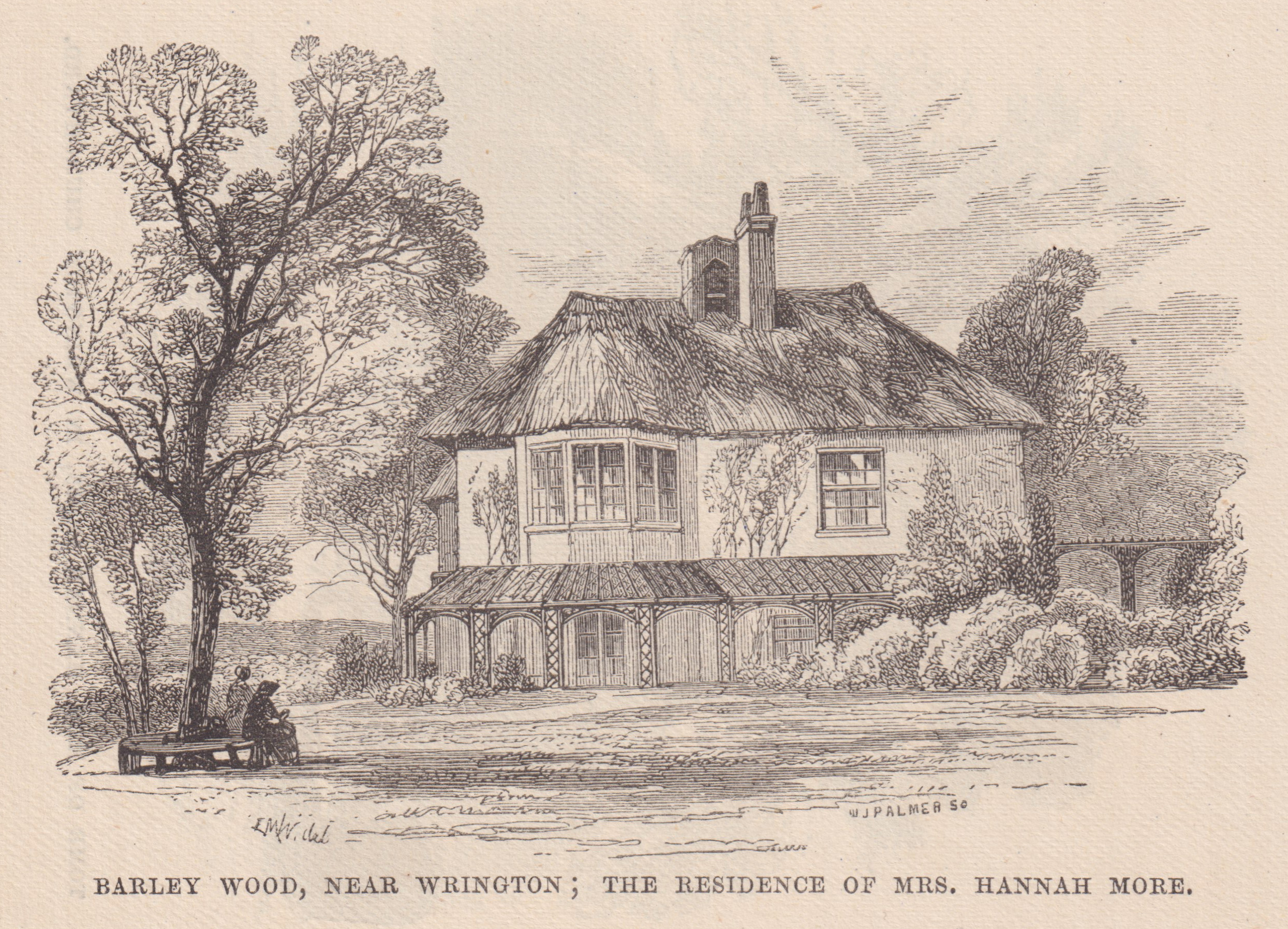
1872 depiction of More's residence

Intending "to escape from the world gradually", More moved in 1802 to Wrington in rural Somerset, where she had built a comfortable house and laid out a garden. She remained, however, active with several Somerset schools for the destitute that she and her sister Martha had founded from the 1780s, with Wilberforce's encouragement. She modelled the idealised hero and heroine in Coelebs in Search of Wife (1809) on the schools' prodigious benefactors: John and Louisa Harford of Blaise Castle.

The schools taught the Bible and the catechism on Sundays and during the week taught "such coarse works as may fit them for servants". In regards to her choice of subjects More declared "I allow of no writing for the poor" and that they were not to be made "scholars and philosophers". There was local opposition: Church of England vicars suspected her of advancing Methodism and some landowners saw even rudimentary literacy as a step above the children's proper station. At Wedmore, the Dean of Wells was petitioned to have More removed from the school.

To the Bishop of Bath and Wells she protested that her schools taught only "such coarse works as may fit them [their charges] for servants. I allow no writing for the poor. My object is... to train up the lower classes in habits of industry and piety."

More refused to read Mary Wollstonecraft's Vindication of the Rights of Women (1792). While many women may be "fond of government", they are not, she believed, "fit for it": "To be unstable and capricious is but too characteristic of our sex." More turned down honorary membership of the Royal Society of Literature, seeing her "sex alone a disqualification".

Having met Hannah More and her sisters in Bath and discussed their schools and other good works, Jane Greg reported to a friend, Martha McTier in Belfast, that she found their "minds crippled in an astonishing degree". McTier was proud that in her school for poor girls her pupils "do not gabble over the testament only" and that she had those who "can read Fox and Pitt".

In 1820, More donated money to Philander Chase, the first Episcopal Bishop of Ohio for the foundation there of Kenyon College. A portrait of More hangs in its Peirce Hall.

== Last years ==
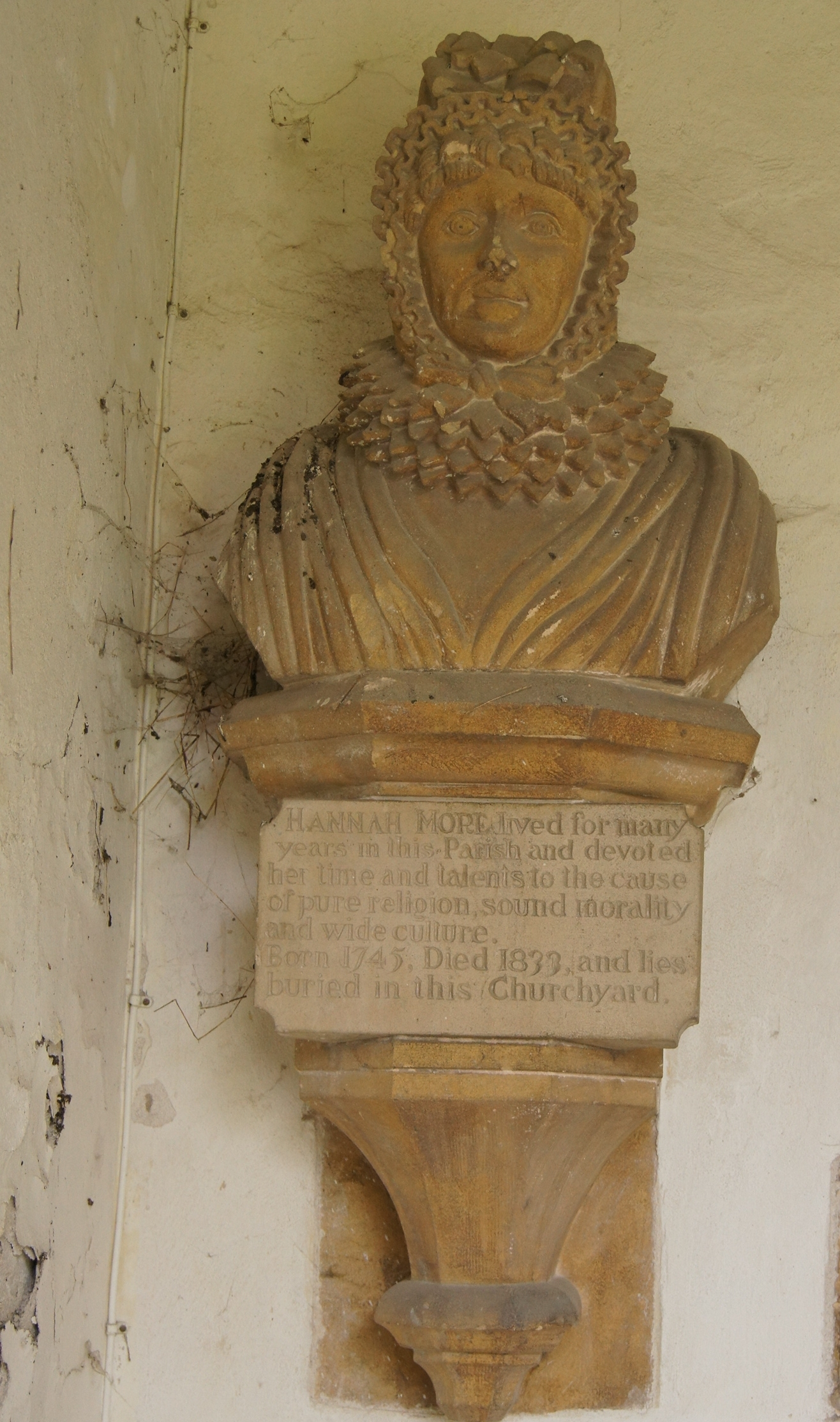
Bust of More in All Saints, Wrington

In Hannah More's last years, philanthropists from all parts made pilgrimages to Wrington, and after 1828 to Clifton, where she died on 7 September 1833. More left about £30,000, chiefly in legacies to charitable institutions and religious societies. The residue was to go to a new Church of St Philip and St Jacob in Bristol. She was buried beside her sisters at the Church of All Saints, Wrington, which has a bust of her in the south porch, beside one of the local son John Locke.

== Legacy ==
Several local schools are named after More. Hannah More Primary School was built in Bristol Old Market in the 1840s. Her image appeared in 2012 on the Bristol Pound, a local currency. Wringdon has named a local street the Hannah More Close. The Hannah More Academy and St. Michael's Church, both in Reisterstown, Maryland, in the United States, are named after More.

However, the Liberal politician Augustine Birrell, in his 1906 work Hannah More Once More, claimed to have buried all 19 volumes of More's works in his garden in disgust.

=== Veneration ===
In 2022, More was officially added to the Episcopal Church liturgical calendar with a feast day on 6 September.

== Archives ==
Letters to, from and about Hannah More are held by Bristol Archives, including one from William Wilberforce (Ref. 28048/C/1/2) (online catalogue). Records relating to Hannah More appear at the British Library, Manuscript Collections, Longleat, Newport Central Library, the Bodleian Library, Cambridge University: St John's College Library, the Victoria and Albert Museum, Bristol Reference Library, Cambridge University Library, The Women's Library, Gloucestershire Archives, and National Museums Liverpool: Maritime Archives and Library.

== Selected works ==
Source: victorianweb.org

- The Search After Happiness, 1773
- The Inflexible Captive, 1774
- Sir Eldred of the Bower and the Bleeding Rock, 1776
- Essays on Various Subjects, 1777
- Percy: A Tragedy, 1777
- Sacred Dramas and Sensibility: A Poem, 1782
- Florio, 1786
- The Bas Bleu, 1786
- Slavery: A Poem, 1788
- Thoughts on the Importance of the Manners of the Great to General Society, 1788
- Bishop Bonner's Ghost, 1789.
- An Estimate of the Religion of the Fashionable World, 1791
- Village Politics, 1793
- Remarks on the Speech of M. Dupont, 1793
- Cheap Repository Tracts, 1795-98.
- Strictures on the Modern System of Female Education, 1799
- "The White Slave Trade" published in the Christian Observer, 1799
- Hints towards Forming the Character of a Young Princess, 1805
- Coelebs in Search of a Wife, 1808
- Practical Piety, 1811
- Christian Morals, 1813
- Essay on the Character and Writings of St Paul, 1815
- Cheap Repository Tracts Suited to the Present Times, 1819
- Moral Sketches, 1819
- The Twelfth of August, or The Feast of Freedom, 1819
- "Queen Caroline affair", 1820
- Bible Rhymes, 1821
- The Spirit of Prayer, 1825

== Sources ==
- Stephen, Leslie (1894). "More, Hannah" . In Lee, Sidney (ed.). Dictionary of National Biography. Vol. 38. London: Smith, Elder & Co. pp. 414–420.
- Jones, M. G. (1952). Hannah More. Cambridge University Press.

== Resources ==
=== Primary sources ===
- Hannah More, Works of Hannah More, 2 vols. New York: Harper, 1840

=== Biographies ===
- Anna Jane Buckland, The life of Hannah More. A lady of two centuries. London: Religious Tract Society, 1882,
- Jeremy and Margaret Collingwood, Hannah More. Oxford: Lion Publishing, 1990, ISBN 0-7459-1532-9
- Crossley Evans, Martin, Hannah More. Bristol Historical Association pamphlets, no. 99, 1999, 32 pp.
- Patricia Demers, The World of Hannah More. Lexington: University Press of Kentucky, 1996, ISBN 0-8131-1978-2
- Charles Howard Ford, Hannah More: A Critical Biography. New York: Peter Lang, 1996, ISBN 0-8204-2798-5
- Marion Harland, Hannah More. New York: G. P. Putnam's Sons, 1900
- Mary Alen Hopkins, Hannah More and Her Circle. London: Longmans, 1947
- M. G. Jones, Hannah More Cambridge: Cambridge University Press, 1952
- Helen C. Knight, Hannah More; or, Life in Hall and Cottage. New York: M. W. Dodd, 1851
- Elizabeth Kowaleski-Wallace, Their Fathers' Daughters: Hannah More, Maria Edgeworth, and Patriarchal Complicity. New York: Oxford University Press, 1991
- Annette Mary Budgett Meakin, Hannah More: A Biographical Study. London: John Murray, 1919
- Karen Swallow Prior, Fierce Convictions: The Extraordinary Life of Hannah More—Poet, Reformer, Abolitionist. Nashville: Nelson Books, 2014, ISBN 978-1-4002-0625-4
- William Roberts, ed., Memoirs of Mrs Hannah More. New York: Harper & Bros., 1836
- Anne Stott, Hannah More: The First Victorian. Oxford: Oxford University Press, 2003, ISBN 0-19-924532-0
- Thomas Taylor, Memoir of Mrs. Hannah More. London: Joseph Rickerby, 1838
- Henry Thompson, The Life of Hannah More With Notices of Her Sisters. London: T. Cadell, 1838
- Charlotte Yonge, Hannah More. Boston: Roberts Brothers, 1888

=== Other sources ===
- Elliott, Dorice Williams (1995). "The Care of the Poor Is Her Profession: Hannah More and Women's Philanthropic Work". Nineteenth-Century Contexts. 19 (2): 179–204. doi:10.1080/08905499508583421. hdl:1808/20908.
- Ingham, Arleen M. (2010). Women And Spirituality In The Writing Of More, Wollstonecraft, Stanton, And Eddy. New York: Palgrave Macmillan. ISBN 978-0-230-10259-0.
- Kelly, Gary (1987). "Revolution, Reaction, and the Expropriation of Popular Culture: Hannah More's Cheap Repository". Man and Nature. 6: 147–59. doi:10.7202/1011875ar.
- Jacqueline McMillan, "Hannah More: From Versificatrix to Saint", In Her Hand: Letters of Romantic-Era British Women Writers in New Zealand Collections. Otago Students of Letters. Dunedin, New Zealand: University of Otago, Department of English, 2013. pp. 23–46. Includes five letters and a poem, hitherto unpublished.
- Mitzi Myers, "Hannah More's Tracts for the Times: Social Fiction and Female Ideology", Fetter'd or Free? British Women Novelists, 1670–1815. Mary Anne Schofield and Cecilia Macheski, eds. Athens: Ohio University Press, 1986
- Myers, Mitzi (1982). "Reform or Ruin: 'A Revolution in Female Manners'". Studies in Eighteenth-Century Culture. 11: 199–216. doi:10.1353/sec.1982.0012. S2CID 258005340.
- Nardin, Jane (2001). "Hannah More and the Rhetoric of Educational Reform". Women's History Review. 10 (2): 211–27. doi:10.1080/09612020100200571.
- Nardin, Jane (2001). "Hannah More and the Problem of Poverty". Texas Studies in Literature and Language. 43 (3): 267–84. doi:10.1353/tsl.2001.0015. S2CID 162100269.
- Pickering, Samuel (1977). "Hannah More's Coelebs in Search of a Wife and the Respectability of the Novel in the Nineteenth Century". Neuphilologische Mitteilungen. 78: 78–85.
- Mona Scheuerman, In Praise of Poverty: Hannah More Counters Thomas Paine and the Radical Threat. Lexington: University Press of Kentucky, 2002
- Stoker, David (2020). "The Watson family, the Association for the Discountenancing of Vice and the Irish Cheap Repository Tracts". The Library: Transactions of the Bibliographical Society. 7. 21: 343–384.
- Kathryn Sutherland, "Hannah More's Counter-Revolutionary Feminism", Revolution in Writing: British Literary Responses to the French Revolution. Kelvin Everest, ed. Milton Keynes: Open University Press, 1991
- Vallone, Lynne (1991). "'A Humble Spirit under Correction': Tracts, Hymns, and the Ideology of Evangelical Fiction for Children, 1780–1820". The Lion and the Unicorn. 15 (2): 72–95. doi:10.1353/uni.0.0155. S2CID 143540425.
- A Comparative Study of Three Anti-Slavery Poems Written by William Blake, Hannah More and Marcus Garvey: Black Stereotyping by Jérémie Kroubo Dagnini for GRAAT On-Line, January 2010

=== Archives ===
- Papers of Hannah More are held at The Women's Library in the Library of the London School of Economics. (Link)
